= Ebrar Karakurt =

Turkish volleyball player (born 2000)

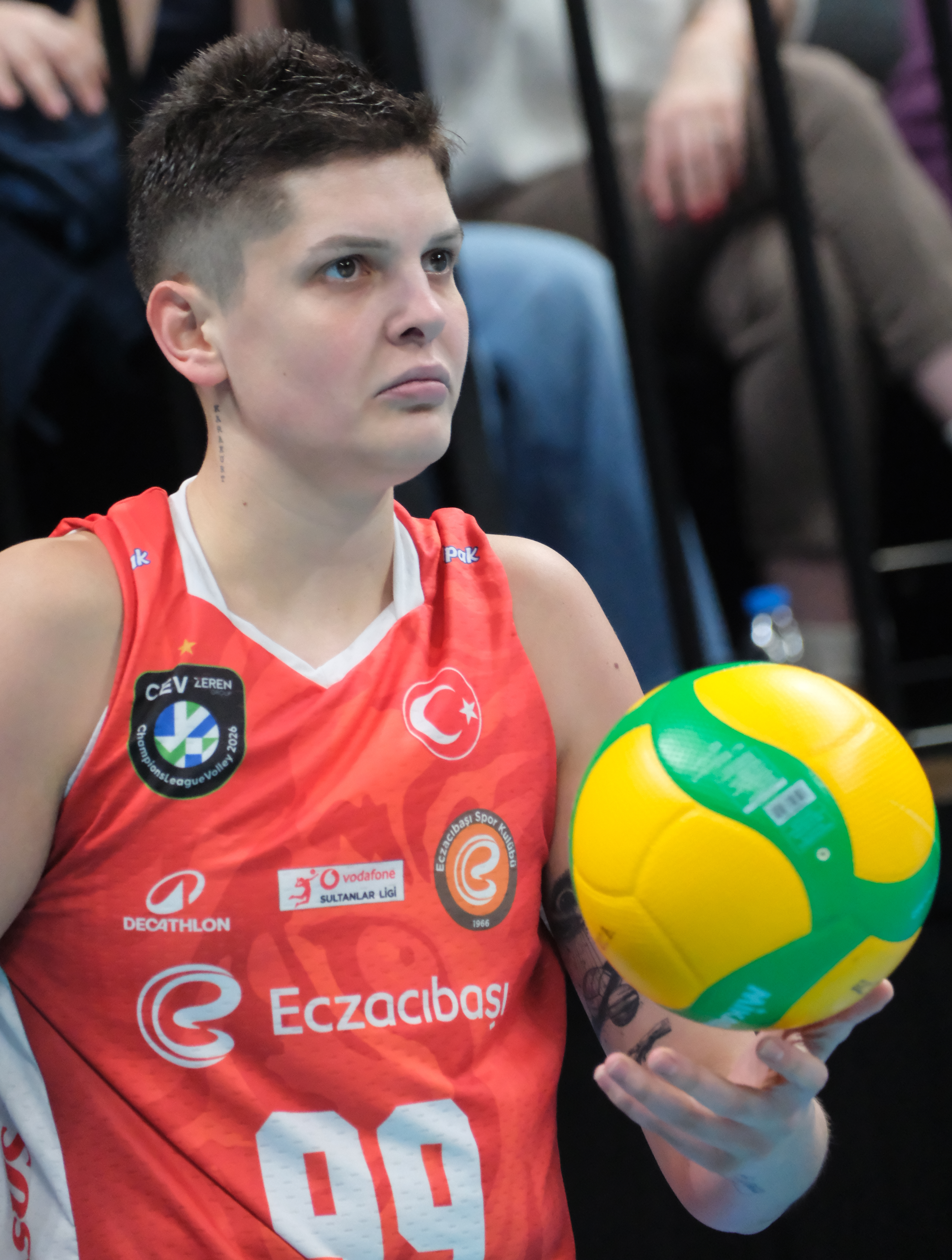
- Karakurt in 2026

Personal information
- Nickname: The Black Wolf
- Born: 17 January 2000 (age 26); Balıkesir, Turkey
- Height: 1.93 m (6 ft 4 in)
- Weight: 72 kg (159 lb)
- Spike: 315 cm (124 in)
- Block: 304 cm (120 in)

Volleyball information
- Position: Opposite / Outside Hitter
- Current club: (Turkey) Eczacıbaşı Dynavit

Career
Years	Teams
2014–2015; 2016–2020; 2020–2021; 2021–2023; 2023–2025; 2025-	(Turkey) Bursa BŞB (Turkey) VakıfBank (Turkey) Türk Hava Yolları (Italy) Igor Gorgonzola Novara (Russia) Lokomotiv Kaliningrad (Turkey) Eczacıbaşı Dynavit

National team
2017	Turkey U18
2017–	Turkey U23
2018–	Turkey
Honours
Women's Volleyball
Representing Turkey
FIVB World Championship
Silver medal – second place	2025 Thailand	Team
FIVB Nations League
Gold medal – first place	2023 Arlington	Team
Silver medal – second place	2018 Nanjing	Team
Bronze medal – third place	2021 Rimini	Team
European Championship
Gold medal – first place	2023 Italy/Germany/Belgium/Estonia	Team
Silver medal – second place	2019 Turkey	Team
Bronze medal – third place	2021 Serbia/Bulgaria/Croatia/Romania	Team
Women's U23 World Championship
Gold medal – first place	2017 Ljubljana	Team
- Last updated: 5 July 2018

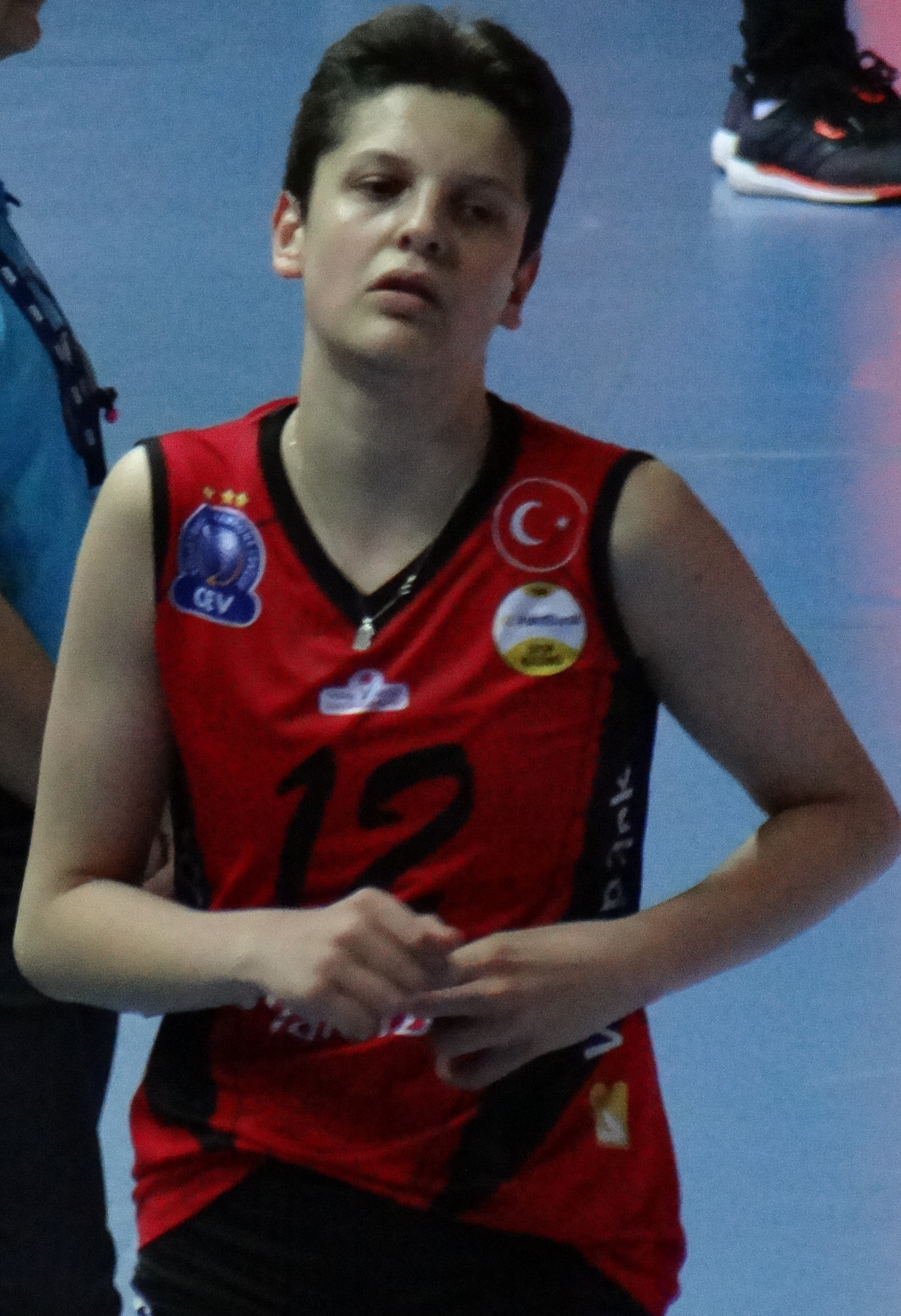
Karakurt in 2018

Ebrar Karakurt (Turkish pronunciation: [ɛbɾ̞ɑɾ̞ kɑˈɾ̞ɑkuɾ̞t]; born 17 January 2000) is a Turkish volleyball player. She is 1.93 m (6 ft 4 in) tall and plays as an outside hitter and opposite. She plays for Eczacıbaşı Dynavit and Turkey women's national volleyball team.

== Volleyball career ==
=== Club ===
Karakurt started her volleyball career at DSİ Spor in Balıkesir. After settling in Bursa, she continued to play in her school team at Bursa Bahçeşehir Anadolu High School, and at the same time in the Bursa Büyükşehir Belediyespor. She played for Bursa BB in the 2014–15 Turkish Women's Volleyball League. She has two club licenses, which allow her to play for Bursa BB and Vakıfbank. She was a member of the youth team at Vakıfbank before she was taken to the senior team.

She was part of the Vakıfbank team, which became champion of the 2017–18 CEV Women's Champions League. She played with the Vakifbank team until moving to the Turkish team Türk Hava Yolları in 2020.

=== National team ===
She was part of the Turkey U18 team, and played at the 2017 Girls' U18 Volleyball European Championship in the Netherlands, as well as at the 2017 FIVB Volleyball Girls' U18 World Championship in Argentina. She was named one of the two Best outside spikers of the world tournament.

She participated at the 2017 FIVB Volleyball Women's U23 World Championship in Slovenia with the Turkey U23 team, which became the champion of the tournament.

After being admitted to the Turkey national team, she experienced many important achievements, the most current of which is the silver medal at the 2019 Women's European Championship organized in Ankara, Turkey. Before that, she played in the 2018 FIVB Volleyball Women's Nations League with her team and reached to the silver medal.

Karakurt competed for Turkey at the 2020 Summer Olympics and the 2024 Summer Olympics.

== Personal life ==
In August 2021 Karakurt shared a photo of herself and her girlfriend on her Instagram account. The Instagram post was published by the conservative newspaper Takvim, which called her sexual orientation and relationship "scandalous", which in turn led to her being subjected to homophobic slurs on social media. Turkish televangelist Ahmet Mahmut Ünlü criticized her by saying that he "wonder[ed] what kind of troubles she could gather on [Turks]". After the attacks Karakurt has received messages of support on social media. The Turkish National Volleyball Federation spokesperson Kurtaran Mumcu supported Karakurt and criticized the homophobic comments directed at her. Demet Akalın, Eda Erdem Dündar and Naz Aydemir were among the people that have shown support to Karakurt.

In an interview with Turkish daily-published and online sports newspaper Fanatik, Karakurt admitted to be a diehard Beşiktaş fan and often posts pictures on her social media account wearing Beşiktaş jersey

== Honours ==
=== Club ===
- 2017–18 CEV Women's Champions League
  2019 FIVB Club World Championship – * Bronze medal, with VakıfBank

=== National team ===
- 2017 U23 World Championship- Gold Medal
- 2018 Nations League – Silver Medal
- 2019 European Championship – Silver Medal
- 2021 Nations League – Bronze Medal
- 2021 European Championship Bronze Medal
- 2023 Nations League – Gold Medal
- 2023 European Championship – Gold Medal

=== Individual ===
- 2017 FIVB Girls' U18 World Championship – "Best outside spikers"
- 2019 FIVB Nations League – "Best outside spikers"
- 2023 CEV European Championship – "Best outside spikers"

Awards
Preceded by (Brazil) Tandara Caixeta	Best Opposite Spiker of FIVB Nations League; 2019	Succeeded by (Brazil) Tandara Caixeta
