= 2021 FIVB Women's Volleyball Nations League =

Tournament details
- Host country: Italy
- City: Rimini
- Dates: 25 May – 25 June
- Teams: 16 (from 4 confederations)
- Venue: 1 (in 1 host city)

Final positions
- Champions: United States (3rd title)
- Runners-up: Brazil
- Third place: Turkey
- Fourth place: Japan

Tournament awards
- MVP: (United States) Michelle Bartsch-Hackley
- Best Setter: (United States) Jordyn Poulter
- Best OH: (United States) Michelle Bartsch-Hackley; (Brazil) Gabriela Guimarães
- Best MB: (Turkey) Eda Erdem Dündar; (Brazil) Carol Gattaz
- Best OPP: (Brazil) Tandara Caixeta
- Best Libero: (United States) Justine Wong-Orantes

Tournament statistics
- Matches played: 124
- Attendance: 0 (0 per match)

The 2021 FIVB Women's Volleyball Nations League was the third edition of the FIVB Women's Volleyball Nations League, an annual women's international volleyball tournament. This edition was scheduled to start earlier than the previous edition due to the 2020 Summer Olympics in July. It was held in between May and June 2021, and the final round took place at the Rimini Fiera in Rimini, Italy.

United States won their third title in the competition, outlasting Brazil in the final. Turkey swept the third place match against Japan. Michelle Bartsch-Hackley claimed her second MVP title of the tournament.

== Teams ==
=== Qualification ===
In the 2019 edition sixteen teams qualified for the competition. Twelve of them qualified as core teams which could not face relegation. Other four teams were selected as challenger teams which could be relegated from the tournament. Canada as winner of 2019 Challenger Cup earned the right to participate in this tournament replacing Bulgaria, the last placed challenger team after the 2019 edition.

Country	Confederation	Designation	Previous appearances			Previous best performance
Country	Confederation	Designation	Total	First	Last	Previous best performance
Belgium	CEV	Challenger team	2	2018	2019	7th place (2019)
Brazil	CSV	Core team	2	2018	2019	Runners-up (2019)
Canada	NORCECA	Challenger team	0	None		Debut
China	AVC	Core team	2	2018	2019	3rd place (2018, 2019)
Dominican Republic	NORCECA	Challenger team	2	2018	2019	8th place (2019)
Germany	CEV	Core team	2	2018	2019	10th place (2019)
Italy	CEV	Core team	2	2018	2019	5th place (2019)
Japan	AVC	Core team	2	2018	2019	9th place (2019)
Netherlands	CEV	Core team	2	2018	2019	5th place (2018)
Poland	CEV	Challenger team	2	2018	2019	5th place (2019)
Russia	CEV	Core team	2	2018	2019	8th place (2018)
Serbia	CEV	Core team	2	2018	2019	5th place (2018)
South Korea	AVC	Core team	2	2018	2019	12th place (2018)
Thailand	AVC	Core team	2	2018	2019	12th place (2019)
Turkey	CEV	Core team	2	2018	2019	Runners-up (2018)
United States	NORCECA	Core team	2	2018	2019	Champions (2018, 2019)

== Format ==
=== Preliminary round ===
The 16 teams compete in a round-robin format. The teams play 3 matches each week and compete five weeks long, for 120 matches. The top four teams after the preliminary round compete in the final round. This year there won't be any promotion or relegation and the 16 participants will also compete in the 2022 edition.

=== Final round ===
The four qualified teams play knock-out round. The semifinals winners advance to compete for the Nations' League title. The losers face each other in the third place match.

== Venue ==
All rounds
Rimini, Italy
Rimini Fiera
Capacity: unknown

== Competition schedule ==
●	Preliminary round	●	Final round

Week 1 25–27 May	Week 2 31 May–2 Jun	Week 3 6–8 Jun	Week 4 12–14 Jun	Week 5 18–20 Jun	Week 6 24–25 Jun
24 matches	24 matches	24 matches	24 matches	24 matches	4 matches

== Pool standing procedure ==
1. Total number of victories (matches won, matches lost)
2. In the event of a tie, the following first tiebreaker will apply: The teams will be ranked by the most points gained per match as follows:
  - Match won 3–0 or 3–1: 3 points for the winner, 0 points for the loser
  - Match won 3–2: 2 points for the winner, 1 point for the loser
  - Match forfeited: 3 points for the winner, 0 points (0–25, 0–25, 0–25) for the loser
3. If teams are still tied after examining the number of victories and points gained, then the FIVB will examine the results in order to break the tie in the following order:
  - Sets quotient: if two or more teams are tied on the number of points gained, they will be ranked by the quotient resulting from the division of the number of all sets won by the number of all sets lost.
  - Points quotient: if the tie persists based on the sets quotient, the teams will be ranked by the quotient resulting from the division of all points scored by the total of points lost during all sets.
  - If the tie persists based on the points quotient, the tie will be broken based on the team that won the match of the Round Robin Phase between the tied teams. When the tie in points quotient is between three or more teams, these teams ranked taking into consideration only the matches involving the teams in question.

== Preliminary round ==
- All times are Central European Summer Time (UTC+02:00).

=== Ranking ===
Pos	Team	Pld	W	L	Pts	SW	SL	SR	SPW	SPL	SPR	Qualification
1	United States	15	14	1	42	42	7	6.000	1199	931	1.288	Final round
2	Brazil	15	13	2	40	42	10	4.200	1251	954	1.311	Final round
3	Japan	15	12	3	33	36	18	2.000	1150	1026	1.121	Final round
4	Turkey	15	11	4	30	37	21	1.762	1304	1237	1.054	Final round
5	China	15	10	5	30	35	21	1.667	1254	1152	1.089	
6	Dominican Republic	15	9	6	29	34	25	1.360	1319	1281	1.030	
7	Netherlands	15	9	6	25	30	26	1.154	1265	1219	1.038	
8	Russia	15	8	7	24	30	26	1.154	1210	1180	1.025	
9	Belgium	15	8	7	19	27	34	0.794	1282	1333	0.962	
10	Germany	15	5	10	16	22	32	0.688	1055	1129	0.934	
11	Poland	15	5	10	15	24	36	0.667	1309	1335	0.981	
12	Italy (H)	15	4	11	16	24	35	0.686	1282	1347	0.952	
13	Serbia	15	4	11	14	19	36	0.528	1115	1274	0.875	
14	Canada	15	3	12	11	17	39	0.436	1094	1309	0.836	
15	South Korea	15	3	12	10	16	40	0.400	1157	1298	0.891	
16	Thailand	15	2	13	6	11	40	0.275	983	1224	0.803	

Source: VNL 2021 standings
(H) Host

=== Week 1 ===
Date	Time		Score		Set 1	Set 2	Set 3	Set 4	Set 5	Total	Report
25 May	10.00	Netherlands	3–0	Belgium	25–21	25–19	25–18			75–58	P2 Report
25 May	12.00	Turkey	3–2	Serbia	25–21	18–25	25–23	22–25	16–14	106–108	P2 Report
25 May	13.00	Germany	0–3	Russia	21–25	22–25	19–25			62–75	P2 Report
25 May	15.00	Japan	3–0	Thailand	25–15	25–17	25–16			75–48	P2 Report
25 May	16.00	China	3–1	South Korea	23–25	25–19	25–19	25–18		98–81	P2 Report
25 May	18.00	Dominican Republic	0–3	United States	20–25	21–25	12–25			53–75	P2 Report
25 May	19.30	Italy	2–3	Poland	22–25	25–22	25–20	22–25	15–17	109–109	P2 Report
25 May	21.00	Brazil	3–1	Canada	23–25	25–11	25–9	25–14		98–59	P2 Report
26 May	10.00	Netherlands	2–3	Germany	25–18	18–25	30–28	23–25	12–15	108–111	P2 Report
26 May	12.00	Thailand	1–3	South Korea	25–15	13–25	18–25	17–25		73–90	P2 Report
26 May	13.00	China	0–3	Japan	13–25	19–25	17–25			49–75	P2 Report
26 May	15.00	Belgium	2–3	Russia	25–23	25–21	19–25	19–25	8–15	96–109	P2 Report
26 May	16.00	Serbia	3–1	Poland	20–25	25–17	25–16	25–21		95–79	P2 Report
26 May	18.00	Brazil	3–0	Dominican Republic	25–20	25–13	25–17			75–50	P2 Report
26 May	19.00	Turkey	3–0	Italy	25–13	25–23	25–16			75–52	P2 Report
26 May	21.00	United States	3–0	Canada	26–24	25–15	25–10			76–49	P2 Report
27 May	10.00	Germany	3–0	Belgium	25–20	25–19	25–13			75–52	P2 Report
27 May	12.00	Russia	1–3	Netherlands	14–25	22–25	25–23	20–25		81–98	P2 Report
27 May	13.00	South Korea	0–3	Japan	18–25	18–25	25–27			61–77	P2 Report
27 May	15.00	Canada	1–3	Dominican Republic	17–25	24–26	30–28	16–25		87–104	P2 Report
27 May	16.00	China	3–0	Thailand	25–15	25–15	25–23			75–53	P2 Report
27 May	18.00	Poland	1–3	Turkey	23–25	27–25	23–25	20–25		93–100	P2 Report
27 May	19.30	Brazil	1–3	United States	17–25	19–25	25–23	22–25		83–98	P2 Report
27 May	21.00	Serbia	3–1	Italy	25–18	23–25	26–24	25–20		99–87	P2 Report

=== Week 2 ===
Date	Time		Score		Set 1	Set 2	Set 3	Set 4	Set 5	Total	Report
31 May	10.00	Thailand	0–3	Netherlands	20–25	9–25	18–25			47–75	P2 Report
31 May	12.00	Belgium	3–2	Dominican Republic	31–33	19–25	25–20	25–16	15–11	115–105	P2 Report
31 May	13.00	China	3–2	Germany	20–25	19–25	27–25	25–21	15–9	106–105	P2 Report
31 May	15.00	Brazil	3–0	Japan	25–15	25–19	25–21			75–55	P2 Report
31 May	16.00	Canada	2–3	Turkey	23–25	25–19	25–22	23–25	12–15	108–106	P2Report
31 May	18.00	South Korea	0–3	Poland	15–25	20–25	22–25			57–75	P2 Report
31 May	19.30	Serbia	0–3	United States	20–25	16–25	12–25			48–75	P2 Report
31 May	21.00	Russia	3–0	Italy	26–24	25–23	27–25			78–72	P2 Report
1 Jun	10.00	Turkey	3–0	Germany	25–20	25–20	25–22			75–62	P2 Report
1 Jun	12.00	Dominican Republic	3–0	South Korea	25–23	28–26	25–18			78–67	P2 Report
1 Jun	13.00	Belgium	3–2	Poland	25–15	17–25	25–19	22–25	15–12	104–96	P2 Report
1 Jun	15.00	Serbia	3–0	Thailand	25–19	25–23	25–23			75–65	P2 Report
1 Jun	16.00	China	2–3	Canada	22–25	25–21	17–25	25–15	12–15	101–101	P2 Report
1 Jun	18.00	United States	3–0	Netherlands	25–22	25–15	25–18			75–55	P2 Report
1 Jun	19.30	Italy	2–3	Japan	25–27	19–25	25–16	25–21	13–15	107–104	P2 Report
1 Jun	21.00	Brazil	3–0	Russia	25–20	25–11	25–18			75–49	P2 Report
2 Jun	10.00	Belgium	3–2	South Korea	23–25	25–23	25–16	19–25	15–12	107–101	P2 Report
2 Jun	12.00	Thailand	0–3	United States	17–25	14–25	16–25			47–75	P2 Report
2 Jun	13.00	Germany	0–3	Canada	28–30	25–27	14–25			67–82	P2 Report
2 Jun	15.00	Japan	3–0	Russia	25–20	25–21	25–21			75–62	P2 Report
2 Jun	16.00	China	0–3	Turkey	15–25	23–25	21–25			59–75	P2 Report
2 Jun	18.00	Poland	1–3	Dominican Republic	25–22	22–25	26–28	21–25		94–100	P2 Report
2 Jun	19.30	Netherlands	3–1	Serbia	25–22	25–16	18–25	25–21		93–84	P2 Report
2 Jun	21.00	Brazil	3–1	Italy	19–25	25–15	25–19	25–19		94–78	P2 Report

=== Week 3 ===
Date	Time		Score		Set 1	Set 2	Set 3	Set 4	Set 5	Total	Report
6 Jun	10.00	China	2–3	Belgium	25–17	25–27	25–23	21–25	8–15	104–107	P2 Report
6 Jun	12.00	Japan	0–3	Netherlands	22–25	20–25	23–25			65–75	P2 Report
6 Jun	15.00	Turkey	3–1	Thailand	23–25	25–12	25–20	25–9		98–66	P2 Report
6 Jun	15.00	Dominican Republic	2–3	Russia	18–25	25–21	20–25	25–22	8–15	96–108	P2 Report
6 Jun	16.00	Brazil	3–0	Serbia	25–12	25–14	25–13			75–39	P2 Report
6 Jun	18.00	Canada	2–3	Poland	25–22	25–21	21–25	17–25	7–15	95–108	P2 Report
6 Jun	19.00	Italy	3–1	South Korea	27–25	23–25	25–22	25–20		100–92	P2 Report
6 Jun	21.00	Germany	0–3	United States	23–25	13–25	13–25			49–75	P2 Report
7 Jun	10.00	Russia	3–1	Thailand	25–14	18–25	25–14	25–20		93–73	P2 Report
7 Jun	12.00	Turkey	1–3	Dominican Republic	22–25	21–25	25–23	17–25		85–98	P2 Report
7 Jun	13.00	Canada	0–3	Japan	16–25	15–25	15–25			46–75	P2 Report
7 Jun	15.00	China	1–3	Serbia	22–25	18–25	25–20	22–25		87–95	P2 Report
7 Jun	16.00	South Korea	0–3	United States	16–25	12–25	14–25			42–75	P2 Report
7 Jun	18.00	Poland	2–3	Netherlands	25–21	23–25	25–22	21–25	9–15	103–108	P2 Report
7 Jun	19.00	Germany	0–3	Italy	21–25	19–25	11–25			51–75	P2 Report
7 Jun	21.00	Belgium	0–3	Brazil	18–25	16–25	17–25			51–75	P2 Report
8 Jun	10.00	Thailand	0–3	Dominican Republic	16–25	17–25	23–25			56–75	P2 Report
8 Jun	12.00	Turkey	3–2	Russia	25–22	22–25	25–18	18–25	15–7	105–97	P2 Report
8 Jun	13.00	Canada	0–3	Netherlands	19–25	12–25	21–25			52–75	P2 Report
8 Jun	15.00	Japan	3–2	Poland	22–25	22–25	25–22	25–23	16–14	110–109	P2 Report
8 Jun	16.00	China	3–2	Brazil	18–25	25–22	25–20	14–25	15–12	97–104	P2 Report
8 Jun	18.00	Germany	3–0	South Korea	25–12	25–21	25–22			75–55	P2 Report
8 Jun	19.00	Belgium	3–2	Serbia	23–25	26–24	25–21	23–25	15–10	112–105	P2 Report
8 Jun	21.00	Italy	1–3	United States	18–25	21–25	25–20	16–25		80–95	P2 Report

=== Week 4 ===
Date	Time		Score		Set 1	Set 2	Set 3	Set 4	Set 5	Total	Report
12 Jun	10.00	Russia	3–0	South Korea	25–23	25–17	25–17			75–57	P2 Report
12 Jun	12.00	Thailand	3–1	Germany	24–26	25–21	25–21	25–16		99–84	P2 Report
12 Jun	13.00	Japan	3–1	Turkey	25–17	25–20	17–25	25–19		92–81	P2 Report
12 Jun	15.00	United States	3–0	Belgium	25–9	26–24	25–20			76–53	P2 Report
12 Jun	16.00	China	3–0	Netherlands	25–12	25–18	33–31			83–61	P2 Report
12 Jun	18.00	Canada	3–1	Serbia	25–21	22–25	25–21	25–18		97–85	P2 Report
12 Jun	19.00	Dominican Republic	3–1	Italy	25–21	25–19	22–25	26–24		98–89	P2 Report
12 Jun	21.00	Poland	0–3	Brazil	22–25	20–25	23–25			65–75	P2 Report
13 Jun	10.00	Turkey	3–0	Belgium	25–20	25–17	25–19			75–56	P2 Report
13 Jun	12.00	United States	3–0	Japan	25–23	26–24	25–20			76–67	P2 Report
13 Jun	13.30	Italy	2–3	Netherlands	21–25	28–26	25–20	21–25	10–15	105–111	P2 Report
13 Jun	15.00	Dominican Republic	1–3	China	14–25	20–25	25–19	22–25		81–94	P2 Report
13 Jun	16.30	Russia	3–0	Canada	25–15	25–12	25–14			75–41	P2 Report
13 Jun	18.00	South Korea	3–1	Serbia	25–13	23–25	25–13	25–23		98–74	P2 Report
13 Jun	19.30	Thailand	0–3	Poland	23–25	15–25	20–25			58–75	P2 Report
13 Jun	21.00	Germany	1–3	Brazil	25–22	17–25	21–25	22–25		85–97	P2 Report
14 Jun	10.00	Belgium	1–3	Japan	25–23	22–25	21–25	21–25		89–98	P2 Report
14 Jun	12.00	Russia	3–0	Serbia	25–8	25–17	25–23			75–48	P2 Report
14 Jun	13.00	Netherlands	1–3	Dominican Republic	23–25	25–23	28–30	22–25		98–103	P2 Report
14 Jun	15.00	Germany	3–0	Poland	25–23	25–20	25–23			75–66	P2 Report
14 Jun	16.00	China	3–0	Italy	25–19	25–11	25–19			75–49	P2 Report
14 Jun	18.00	South Korea	3–2	Canada	15–25	25–18	27–29	25–20	21–19	113–111	P2 Report
14 Jun	19.30	Brazil	3–0	Thailand	25–11	25–14	25–10			75–35	P2 Report
14 Jun	21.00	United States	3–1	Turkey	25–21	23–25	25–15	25–14		98–75	P2 Report

=== Week 5 ===
Date	Time		Score		Set 1	Set 2	Set 3	Set 4	Set 5	Total	Report
18 Jun	10.00	Germany	3–0	Serbia	25–23	25–16	25–21			75–60	P2 Report
18 Jun	12.00	Japan	3–2	Dominican Republic	18–25	24–26	25–22	25–15	15–11	107–99	P2 Report
18 Jun	13.00	Thailand	1–3	Belgium	23–25	24–26	25–23	15–25		87–99	P2 Report
18 Jun	15.00	South Korea	0–3	Brazil	18–25	23–25	18–25			59–75	P2 Report
18 Jun	16.00	China	3–0	Russia	25–18	25–23	25–16			75–57	P2 Report
18 Jun	18.00	Poland	0–3	United States	27–29	27–29	14–25			68–83	P2 Report
18 Jun	19.00	Canada	0–3	Italy	18–25	20–25	20–25			58–75	P2 Report
18 Jun	21.00	Turkey	3–0	Netherlands	27–25	25–20	25–20			77–65	P2 Report
19 Jun	10.00	Dominican Republic	3–0	Serbia	25–14	25–20	25–18			75–52	P2 Report
19 Jun	12.00	United States	3–1	Russia	25–21	25–27	25–23	25–15		100–86	P2 Report
19 Jun	13.00	Japan	3–1	Germany	25–23	19–25	26–24	25–15		95–87	P2 Report
19 Jun	15.00	Thailand	3–0	Canada	25–16	25–17	25–17			75–50	P2 Report
19 Jun	16.00	China	3–0	Poland	26–24	25–22	25–16			76–62	P2 Report
19 Jun	18.00	South Korea	1–3	Turkey	23–25	25–20	17–25	18–25		83–95	P2 Report
19 Jun	19.30	Brazil	3–0	Netherlands	25–19	25–19	25–20			75–58	P2 Report
19 Jun	21.00	Belgium	3–2	Italy	25–17	20–25	22–25	25–17	15–10	107–94	P2 Report
20 Jun	10.00	Dominican Republic	3–2	Germany	25–21	25–22	14–25	25–27	15–9	104–104	P2 Report
20 Jun	12.00	China	3–0	United States	25–10	25–20	25–17			75–47	P2 Report
20 Jun	13.00	Thailand	1–3	Italy	35–33	21–25	25–27	20–25		101–110	P2 Report
20 Jun	15.00	Japan	3–0	Serbia	25–12	25–22	25–15			75–49	P2 Report
20 Jun	16.00	Russia	2–3	Poland	17–25	25–20	16–25	25–22	7–15	90–107	P2 Report
20 Jun	18.00	South Korea	2–3	Netherlands	20–25	25–23	18–25	25–22	12–15	100–110	P2 Report
20 Jun	19.30	Belgium	3–0	Canada	26–24	25–17	25–17			76–58	P2 Report
20 Jun	21.00	Brazil	3–1	Turkey	25–18	25–16	25–27	25–15		100–76	P2 Report

== Final round ==
- All times are Central European Summer Time (UTC+02:00).

Semi-finals
24 June
Brazil	3
Japan	1
24 June
United States	3
Turkey	0

Final
25 June
Brazil	1
United States	3
Third place match
25 June
Japan	0
Turkey	3

=== Semi-finals ===
Date	Time		Score		Set 1	Set 2	Set 3	Set 4	Set 5	Total	Report
24 Jun	16:00	Brazil	3–1	Japan	25–15	25–23	29–31	25–16		104–85	P2 Report
24 Jun	19:30	United States	3–0	Turkey	25–21	25–23	25–20			75–64	P2 Report

=== Third place match ===
Date	Time		Score		Set 1	Set 2	Set 3	Set 4	Set 5	Total	Report
25 Jun	16:00	Japan	0–3	Turkey	19–25	16–25	17–25			52–75	P2 Report

=== Final ===
Date	Time		Score		Set 1	Set 2	Set 3	Set 4	Set 5	Total	Report
25 Jun	19:30	Brazil	1–3	United States	28–26	23–25	23–25	21–25		95–101	P2 Report

== Final standing ==
Rank	Team
1st place, gold medalist(s)	United States
2nd place, silver medalist(s)	Brazil
3rd place, bronze medalist(s)	Turkey
4	Japan
5	China
6	Dominican Republic
7	Netherlands
8	Russia
9	Belgium
10	Germany
11	Poland
12	Italy
13	Serbia
14	Canada
15	South Korea
16	Thailand

Source: VNL 2021 final standings

2021 Women's VNL champions

United States
Third title

14–woman roster
Micha Hancock, Jordyn Poulter, Justine Wong-Orantes, Jordan Larson (c), Andrea Drews, Jordan Thompson, Michelle Bartsch-Hackley, Foluke Akinradewo, Haleigh Washington, Kelsey Robinson, Chiaka Ogbogu
Head coach
Karch Kiraly

== Awards ==
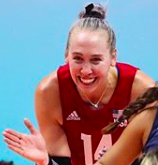
Michelle Bartsch-Hackley was the 2021 FIVB Nations League Most Valuable Player

- Most valuable player
  Michelle Bartsch-Hackley (USA)
- Best setter
  Jordyn Poulter (USA)
- Best outside hitters
  Michelle Bartsch-Hackley (USA)
  Gabriela Guimarães (BRA)
- Best middle blockers
  Eda Erdem Dündar (TUR)
  Carol Gattaz (BRA)
- Best Opposite
  Tandara Caixeta (BRA)
- Best libero
  Justine Wong-Orantes (USA)

== Statistics leaders ==
=== Preliminary round ===
Statistics leaders correct as of preliminary round.

Best Scorers (Note: (Best scorers determined by scored points from spike, block and serve).)
	Player	Attacks	Blocks	Serves	Total
1	(Belgium) Britt Herbots	314	12	11	337
2	(Turkey) Ebrar Karakurt	250	21	18	289
3	(Poland) Magdalena Stysiak	245	22	16	283
4	(Brazil) Tandara Caixeta	234	25	5	264
5	(Japan) Sarina Koga	226	11	17	254

Best Attackers (Note: (Best attackers determined by successful spikes).)
	Player	Spikes	Faults	Shots	%	Total
1	(Belgium) Britt Herbots	314	88	370	40.67	772
2	(Turkey) Ebrar Karakurt	250	85	238	43.63	573
3	(Poland) Magdalena Stysiak	245	104	202	44.46	551
4	(Brazil) Tandara Caixeta	234	62	222	45.17	518
5	(Japan) Sarina Koga	226	68	262	40.65	556

Best Blockers (Note: (Best blockers determined by the stuff blocks, faults and rebounds).)
	Player	Blocks	Faults	Rebounds	Avg	Total
1	(Turkey) Eda Erdem Dündar	46	62	89	2.71	197
2	(Serbia) Jovana Kocić	43	67	56	2.87	166
3	(Belgium) Marlies Janssens	40	44	47	2.86	131
4	(Russia) Irina Koroleva	38	62	81	2.53	181
5	(Netherlands) Eline Timmerman	37	79	70	2.47	186

Best Servers (Note: (Best servers determined by aces, faults and hits).)
	Player	Aces	Faults	Hits	Avg	Total
1	(Belgium) Marlies Janssens	23	20	139	1.64	182
2	(Germany) Hanna Orthmann	21	36	82	1.40	139
3	(Germany) Camilla Weitzel	21	39	162	1.40	222
4	(Turkey) Eda Erdem Dündar	19	18	146	1.12	183
5	(Belgium) Celine Van Gestel	18	11	184	1.20	213

Best Setters (Note: (Best setters determined by running setts, faults and still sets).)
	Player	Running	Faults	Still	Avg	Total
1	(Japan) Aki Momii	396	12	1175	24.75	1583
2	(Netherlands) Britt Bongaerts	352	6	1207	23.47	1565
3	(Brazil) Macris Carneiro	333	6	947	19.59	1286
4	(Belgium) Ilka Van de Vyver	292	6	947	19.47	1547
5	(Turkey) Cansu Özbay	271	9	932	15.94	1212

Best Diggers (Note: (Best diggers determined by successful digs, faults and receptions).)
	Player	Digs	Faults	Receptions	Avg	Total
1	(Dominican Republic) Brenda Castillo	250	62	29	16.67	341
2	(Brazil) Camila Brait	227	31	21	13.35	279
3	(Turkey) Simge Şebnem Aköz	215	48	18	12.65	281
4	(Netherlands) Myrthe Schoot	193	49	28	12.87	270
5	(United States) Justine Wong-Orantes	192	35	16	11.29	243

Best Receivers (Note: (Best receivers determined by efficient receptions, faults and serve receptions).)
	Player	Excellents	Faults	Serve	%	Total
1	(Japan) Mayu Ishikawa	179	14	176	48.51	369
2	(Japan) Sarina Koga	157	16	172	45.51	345
3	(Poland) Maria Stenzel	147	17	194	41.06	358
4	(Germany) Lina Alsmeier	138	21	186	40.00	345
5	(Netherlands) Anne Buijs	137	23	217	36.34	377

=== Final round ===
Statistics leaders correct as of final round.

Best Scorers
	Player	Attacks	Blocks	Serves	Total
1	(Turkey) Ebrar Karakurt	38	7	1	46
2	(Brazil) Tandara Caixeta	37	3	0	40
3	(Brazil) Gabriela Guimarães	33	2	1	36
4	(United States) Michelle Bartsch-Hackley	25	4	1	30
5	(Japan) Sarina Koga	26	0	3	29

Best Attackers
	Player	Spikes	Faults	Shots	%	Total
1	(Turkey) Ebrar Karakurt	38	7	28	52.05	73
2	(Brazil) Tandara Caixeta	37	11	35	44.58	83
3	(Brazil) Gabriela Guimarães	33	9	30	45.83	72
4	(Japan) Sarina Koga	26	11	39	34.21	76
5	(United States) Michelle Bartsch-Hackley	25	7	35	37.31	67

Best Blockers
	Player	Blocks	Faults	Rebounds	Avg	Total
1	(Brazil) Ana Carolina da Silva	10	7	9	5.00	26
2	(United States) Jordyn Poulter	7	6	6	3.50	19
3	(Turkey) Ebrar Karakurt	7	4	11	3.50	22
4	(Brazil) Carol Gattaz	6	8	13	3.00	27
5	(United States) Michelle Bartsch-Hackley	4	9	5	2.00	18

Best Servers
	Player	Aces	Faults	Hits	Avg	Total
1	(Japan) Sarina Koga	3	0	22	1.50	25
2	(Japan) Ai Kurogo	2	2	22	1.00	26
3	(United States) Andrea Drews	2	1	8	1.00	11
4	(United States) Jordan Thompson	2	3	12	1.00	17
5	(Turkey) Eda Erdem Dündar	2	2	17	1.00	21

Best Setters
	Player	Running	Faults	Still	Avg	Total
1	(Brazil) Macris Carneiro	55	3	156	27.50	214
2	(Japan) Aki Momii	48	3	146	24.00	197
3	(United States) Jordyn Poulter	46	3	162	23.00	211
4	(Turkey) Cansu Özbay	28	0	137	14.00	165
5	(Japan) Kanami Tashiro	4	0	16	2.00	20

Best Diggers
	Player	Digs	Faults	Receptions	Avg	Total
1	(Japan) Ai Kurogo	28	5	3	14.00	36
2	(United States) Justine Wong-Orantes	28	9	4	14.00	41
3	(Brazil) Camila Brait	27	4	2	13.50	33
4	(Brazil) Gabriela Guimarães	24	5	5	12.00	34
5	(Brazil) Macris Carneiro	22	4	2	11.00	28

Best Receivers
	Player	Excellents	Faults	Serve	%	Total
1	(United States) Michelle Bartsch-Hackley	34	1	42	44.16	77
2	(Japan) Mayu Ishikawa	28	0	33	45.90	61
3	(Japan) Sarina Koga	27	3	25	49.09	55
4	(Turkey) İlkin Aydın	19	1	14	55.88	34
5	(Brazil) Gabriela Guimarães	18	0	31	36.73	49

== See also ==
- 2019 FIVB Volleyball Women's Challenger Cup
- Volleyball at the 2020 Summer Olympics
