= Jordyn Poulter =

American volleyball player (born 1997)

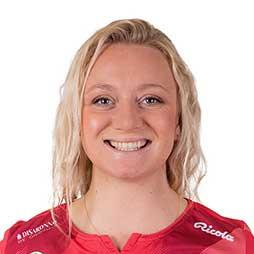
- Poulter in 2019

Personal information
- Full name: Jordyn Ashley Poulter
- Nationality: American
- Born: July 31, 1997 (age 29) Naperville, Illinois, U.S.
- Home town: Aurora, Colorado, U.S.
- Education: University of Illinois at Urbana-Champaign
- Height: 1.88 m (6 ft 2 in)
- Weight: 83 kg (183 lb)
- Spike: 313 cm (123 in)
- Block: 305 cm (120 in)

Volleyball information
- Position: Setter
- Current club: (United States) LOVB Salt Lake
- Number: 2 (national team) 1 (LOVB Salt Lake)

Career
- Years: Team
- 2018–2020: Chieri
- 2020–2022: Busto Arsizio Volley
- 2022–2024: Igor Gorgonzola Novara
- 2024–present: LOVB Salt Lake

National team
- Years: Team
- 2018–present: United States
Medal record
Women's volleyball
Representing the United States
Olympic Games
Gold medal – first place	2020 Tokyo	Team
Silver medal – second place	2024 Paris	Team
FIVB World Cup
Silver medal – second place	2019 Japan	Team
FIVB Nations League
Gold medal – first place	2019 Nanjing	Team
Gold medal – first place	2021 Rimini	Team
NORCECA
Silver medal – second place	2019 San Juan
Pan-American Cup
Gold medal – first place	2018 Santo Domingo

Jordyn Ashley Poulter (/ˈpoʊltər/ POHL-tər; born July 31, 1997) is an American volleyball player. As a member of the United States women's national volleyball team, she has earned several international titles, including the program's first-ever Olympic gold medal at the 2020 Summer Olympics and a silver medal at the 2024 Summer Olympics. Poulter played collegiate volleyball with the University of Illinois Fighting Illini from 2015 to 2018.

== Early life ==
Poulter was born in Naperville, Illinois and grew up in Aurora, Colorado, attending Eaglecrest High School. She was the overall No. 3 nationally (and top setter) ranked recruit coming out of high school and won several state and national awards, including the Andi Collins award for the best setter in the country. She totaled 2,529 assists, 716 kills, 664 digs, 385 blocks and 208 aces over 101 high school matches.

== Career ==
=== University of Illinois ===
Poulter was recruited by several top college volleyball teams, with her final two choices being UCLA and Illinois, ultimately committing to Illinois between her freshman and sophomore years in high school. She was a two-time All-American and was named the Big Ten Setter of the Year during her senior season, and led Illinois to a Final Four appearance.

=== Professional and US National Team ===
Poulter began training with the senior US National Team in the summer of 2018, while she was still in college. She was part of the team that won a gold medal in the 2019 FIVB Volleyball Women's Nations League tournament, as well as the 2019 Women's Pan-American Volleyball Cup. In May 2021, she was named to the 18-player roster for the 2021 FIVB Volleyball Women's Nations League. Poulter started the majority of the matches, and USA won the gold medal for the third straight year after defeating Brazil. She was named "Best Setter" at the conclusion of the tournament.

On June 7, 2021, US National Team head coach Karch Kiraly announced Poulter would be part of the 12-player Olympic roster for the 2020 Summer Olympics in Tokyo. After starting all matches, Poulter suffered an ankle injury during the final pool play match against Italy. The injury forced her to miss the quarterfinals versus Dominican Republic; however, USA was able to win the match after fellow setter Micha Hancock came in as a substitute. Poulter successfully returned to lead her team to victories in the semifinals and eventually led Team USA to their first-ever gold medal in women's indoor competition. For her efforts, she was named as the "Best Setter" of the Olympics.

Poulter signed with Igor Gorgonzola Novara for the 2022–2023 professional season as the starting setter, but suffered season-ending ACL, MCL and meniscus injuries in her knee during a match in December 2022. She returned to play with the US National Team at the 2024 Volleyball Women's Nations League and was named to the Olympic roster for the 2024 Summer Olympics in Paris.

Poulter is a founding athlete for LOVB Pro (LOVB), a new professional league in the US. She will play for the league's Salt Lake City team in its inaugural season.

== Individual awards ==
=== High school ===
- 2011-2014 All-Centennial Conference First Team
- 2012-2014 Denver Post All-Colorado Volleyball Team
- 2014 CHSAA Class 5A All-State Player of the Year
- 2014 Andi Collins Award
- 2014 MaxPreps All-America
- 2014 PrepVolleyball.com All-America
- 2014 Under Armour First-Team All-America

=== Collegiate ===
- 2015 Illinois Female Newcomer of the Year
- 2015 Big Ten All-Freshman Team
- 2016 AVCA Honorable Mention All-America
- 2016 AVCA All-Northeast Region
- 2016 All-Big Ten
- 2017 AVCA Third Team All-America
- 2017 All-Big Ten
- 2018 Honda Sports Award Nominee
- 2018 AVCA First Team All-America
- 2018 Big Ten Setter of the Year (co)
- 2018 AVCA Northeast Region Player of the Year
- 2018 All-Big Ten
- 2018 NCAA Champaign Regional Most Outstanding Player
- 2018 University of Illinois Athletics Dike Eddleman Female Athlete of the Year

=== International ===
- 2013 World Championships U18 – Best Setter
- 2013 USA Girls Youth National Team, FIVB U18 World Championships – Best Setter
- 2014 NORCECA Championship U20 Women's Junior NORCECA Championship – Best Setter
- 2021 Nations League "Best Setter"
- 2020 Summer Olympics – "Best Setter"

== Personal life ==
In May 2022, Poulter revealed her gold medal from the 2020 Summer Olympics was stolen out of her vehicle in Anaheim, California. The thief was arrested in early June, and the medal was recovered on June 27, 2022 after the owners of an Anaheim barbershop discovered it on their property and contacted the Anaheim Police Department.

Awards
Preceded by (United States) Alisha Glass	Best Setter of Olympic Games; 2020	Succeeded by Incumbent
Preceded by (Brazil) Macris Carneiro	Best Setter of FIVB Nations League; 2021	Succeeded by (Italy) Alessia Orro
