= Michelle Bartsch-Hackley =

American volleyball player

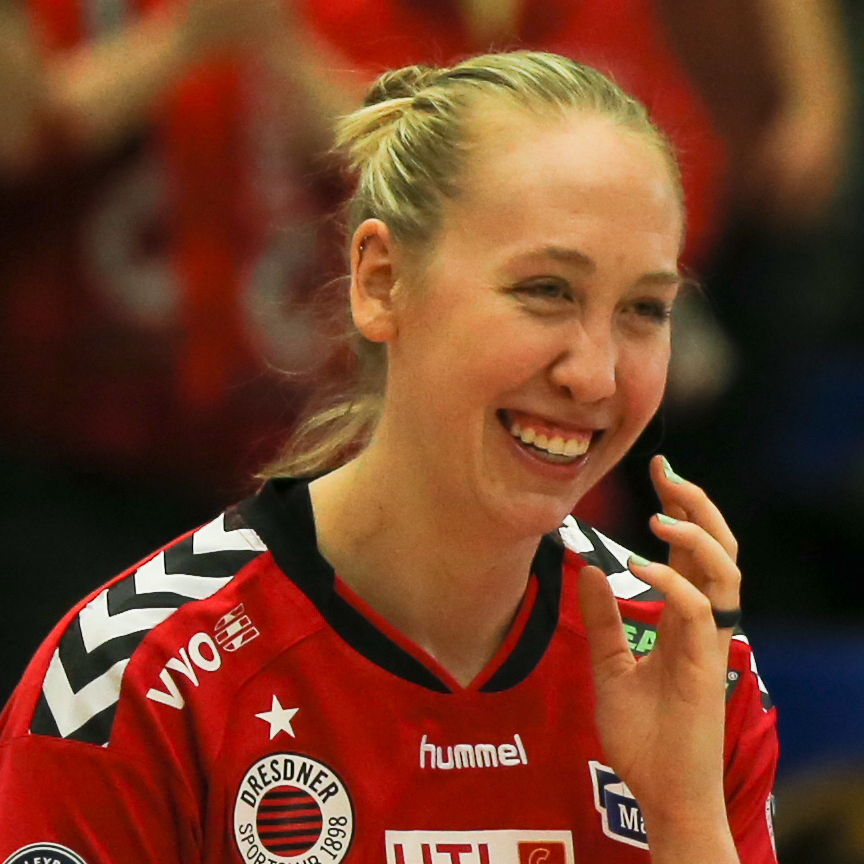
- Bartsch in 2015

Personal information
- Full name: Michelle Bartsch-Hackley
- Nickname: Mesh, Mitch, Bartschy, Panda, Slugger
- Nationality: American
- Born: February 12, 1990 (age 36); Kansas City, Kansas
- Hometown: Collinsville, Illinois
- Height: 190 cm (75 in)
- Weight: 90 kg (198 lb)
- Spike: 305 cm (120 in)
- Block: 296 cm (117 in)

Coaching information
Previous teams coached
Years	Teams
2023	Ohio State Univ. (Assistant coach)

Volleyball information
- Position: Outside hitter / opposite Hitter
- Current club: (United States) Columbus Fury
- Number: 14 (national team)

Career
Years	Teams
2008–2011	(United States) University of Illinois
2012	(Puerto Rico) Llaneras de Toa Baja
2013–2014	(Germany) Rote Raben
2014–16	(Germany) Dresdner SC
2016–17	(Italy) Neruda Bolzano
2017–18	(Italy) Futura Busto Arsizio
2018–19	(Italy) AGIL Novara
2019–20	(China) Beijing BAIC Motors
2020–2022	(Turkey) Vakıfbank Istanbul
2024–	(United States) Columbus Fury

National team
2015 - 2021	United States
Medal record
Women's volleyball
Representing the United States
Olympic Games
Gold medal – first place	2020 Tokyo	Team
World Cup
Silver medal – second place	2019 Japan	Team
World Grand Champions Cup
Bronze medal – third place	2017 Japan	Team
FIVB Nations League
Gold medal – first place	2018 Nanjing	Team
Gold medal – first place	2019 Nanjing	Team
Gold medal – first place	2021 Rimini	Team
Pan-American Cup
Gold medal – first place	2017 Cañete/Lima

Michelle Bartsch-Hackley (born February 12, 1990) is an American professional volleyball player for the United States women's national volleyball team. She played collegiate volleyball with the University of Illinois Fighting Illini from 2008 to 2011. She won gold with the national team at the 2020 Tokyo Summer Olympics.

== Career ==
Bartsch's career began at Collinsville High School in Illinois, where she excelled at basketball, swimming and track and field. While playing for her high school, she joined the US youth selections, winning the gold medal at the US Under-18 Championship in 2006 and the North American Under-20 Championship in 2008. She was also awarded the title of Best Server in the competition.

From 2008 to 2011, she played for the University of Illinois, Urbana-Champaign, reaching the NCAA Division I National Championship in her senior year, losing to the University of California, Los Angeles; despite this defeat, she received several individual awards during the season.

She made her professional debut in 2012 with Llaneras de Toa Baja, in the Liga de Voleibol Superior Feminino in Puerto Rico.

She then played for Rote Raben Vilsbiburg from 2013 to 2014, winning the German Cup. She stayed in Germany the following season, but played for the Dresdner Sportclub 1898 club, who would go on to win the German Championship 2015 and again the German Championship plus the German Cup in 2016. In 2015 she made her debut in the US national team. In 2015, she won a gold medal at the Pan American Games. In 2017, she won a gold medal at the 2017 Women's Pan-American Volleyball Cup, and a bronze medal at the 2017 FIVB Volleyball Women's World Grand Champions Cup.

In 2016–17, she played for Neruda Volley di Bolzano in Serie A1. In 2017 she played in Futura Volley Busto Arsizio. In 2018 she was recruited by AGIL Volley. In 2019 she played for Beijing BAIC Motor China Volleyball League.

Bartsch-Hackley was named an alternate to the U.S. volleyball team at the 2016 Summer Olympics in Rio de Janeiro. She used this as motivation to earn a spot in the future Olympic Games, as she said in July 2021 "I think after being an alternate in 2016 I grew hungrier because I was so close at that time. The past few years I've tried to take every opportunity and use it to grow and improve."

In 2020, she was inducted into the University of Illinois Athletics Hall of Fame.

In May 2021, she was named to the 18-player roster for the FIVB Volleyball Nations League tournament played May 25-June 24 in Rimini, Italy. It was the only major international competition before the Tokyo Olympics in July. The U.S. team won gold and Bartsch-Hackley was named Best Outside Hitter and MVP.

On June 7, 2021, US National Team head coach Karch Kiraly announced she would be part of the 12-player Olympic roster for the 2020 Summer Olympics in Tokyo. On August 8, 2021, she won a gold medal as a member of the U.S. women's volleyball team that defeated Brazil 3–0 in the final match. She was named as co-"Best outside hitter" (along with teammate Jordan Larson) of the Olympics.

On April 12, 2022, Bartsch-Hackley announced that she will take a break after the 2022 club season concludes and will leave volleyball indefinitely through at least January 2023. During this period, she will not participate in any competitions or sign with new clubs.

== Awards ==
=== Clubs ===
- 2021–22 CEV Women's Champions League – Champion with Vakıfbank

=== Individual ===
- 2018 Nations League "Best outside hitter"
- 2018 Nations League "Most valuable player"
- 2021 Nation's League "Best outside hitter"
- 2021 Nations League "Most valuable player"
- 2020 Summer Olympics - "Best outside hitter"

== Personal life ==
Her husband is Corbin Hackley. He frequently travels with her during her playing commitments and is often accompanied by their dog, Champion.

Her mother, Julie, played volleyball at the University of Kansas, while her father, Michael, competed in soccer at Blackburn College.

She completed her undergraduate studies at the University of Illinois in 2012, earning a degree in sports management.

Her brother, Andrew Bartsch, is married to Kelsey Card, who competed in the discus throw at the Tokyo Summer Olympics.

Awards
Preceded by (China) Zhu Ting (Serbia) Brankica Mihajlović	Best Outside Hitter of Olympic Games; 2020 ex aequo (United States) Jordan Larson	Succeeded by Incumbent
Preceded by - (United States) Annie Drews	Most Valuable Player of FIVB Nations League; 2018; 2021	Succeeded by (United States) Annie Drews (Italy) Paola Egonu
Preceded by -	Best Outside Hitter of FIVB Nations League; 2018 ex aequo (China) Zhu Ting	Succeeded by (Brazil) Gabriela Guimarães (China) Liu Yanhan
