= 2019 FIVB Women's Volleyball Nations League =

2019世界女排联赛 (Chinese); 2019 Shìjiè Nǚpái Liánsài

Tournament details
- Host country: China
- City: Nanjing (final round)
- Dates: 21 May – 7 July
- Teams: 16 (from 4 confederations)
- Venue: 21 (in 21 host cities)

Final positions
- Champions: United States (2nd title)
- Runners-up: Brazil
- Third place: China
- Fourth place: Turkey
- Relegated: Bulgaria

Tournament awards
- MVP: (United States) Andrea Drews
- Best Setter: (Brazil) Macris Carneiro
- Best OH: (Brazil) Gabriela Guimarães; (China) Liu Yanhan
- Best MB: (Brazil) Ana Beatriz Corrêa; (United States) Haleigh Washington
- Best OPP: (Turkey) Ebrar Karakurt
- Best Libero: (United States) Megan Courtney

Tournament statistics
- Matches played: 130
- Attendance: 399,575 (3,074 per match)

The 2019 FIVB Women's Volleyball Nations League was the second edition of the FIVB Women's Volleyball Nations League, an annual international women's volleyball tournament contested by 16 national teams. It was held between May and July 2019, and for the second time, the final round took place again at the Nanjing Olympic Sports Centre in Nanjing, China.

United States won their second title in the competition, defeating Brazil in the final. China defeated Turkey in the third place match. Andrea Drews elected the MVP of the tournament.

Following the results of the 2018 Nations League and 2018 Challenger Cup, Argentina was replaced by debutants Bulgaria in this edition. Accordingly, following the results of this edition of the Nations League and the 2019 Challenger Cup, Bulgaria was replaced by newcomers Canada in the 2021 edition.

== Teams ==
=== Qualification ===
Sixteen teams qualified for the competition. Twelve of them qualified as core teams which cannot face relegation. The other four teams were selected as challenger teams which could be relegated from the tournament. Bulgaria replaced Argentina after winning the 2018 Challenger Cup.

Country	Confederation	Designation	Previous appearances			Previous best performance
Country	Confederation	Designation	Total	First	Last	Previous best performance
Belgium	CEV	Challenger team	1	2018	2018	13th place (2018)
Brazil	CSV	Core team	1	2018	2018	4th place (2018)
Bulgaria	CEV	Challenger team	0	None		Debut
China	AVC	Core team	1	2018	2018	3rd place (2018)
Dominican Republic	NORCECA	Challenger team	1	2018	2018	14th place (2018)
Germany	CEV	Core team	1	2018	2018	11th place (2018)
Italy	CEV	Core team	1	2018	2018	7th place (2018)
Japan	AVC	Core team	1	2018	2018	10th place (2018)
Netherlands	CEV	Core team	1	2018	2018	5th place (2018)
Poland	CEV	Challenger team	1	2018	2018	9th place (2018)
Russia	CEV	Core team	1	2018	2018	8th place (2018)
Serbia	CEV	Core team	1	2018	2018	5th place (2018)
South Korea	AVC	Core team	1	2018	2018	12th place (2018)
Thailand	AVC	Core team	1	2018	2018	15th place (2019)
Turkey	CEV	Core team	1	2018	2018	Runners-up (2018)
United States	NORCECA	Core team	1	2018	2018	Champions (2018)

== Format ==
=== Preliminary round ===
The 16 teams compete in a round-robin format with every core team hosting a pool at least once. The teams are divided into 4 pools of 4 teams at each week and compete five weeks long, for 120 matches. The top five teams after the preliminary round join the hosts of the final round to compete in the final round. The relegation takes into consideration only the 4 challenger teams. The last ranked challenger team will be excluded from the 2020 Nations League. The winners of the Challenger Cup will qualify for the next edition as a challenger team.

=== Final round ===
The six qualified teams play in 2 pools of 3 teams in round-robin. The top 2 teams of each pool qualify for the semifinals. The pool winners play against the runners-up in this round. The semifinals winners advance to compete for the Nations' League title. The losers face each other in the third place match.

== Pool composition ==
The overview of pools was released on October 23, 2018.

=== Preliminary round ===
Week 1
Pool 1 Poland	Pool 2 Bulgaria	Pool 3 Brazil	Pool 4 Serbia
Poland; Italy; Thailand; Germany	Bulgaria; Japan; Belgium; United States	Brazil; Dominican Republic; Russia; China	Serbia; Netherlands; Turkey; South Korea
Week 2
Pool 5 Italy	Pool 6 Turkey	Pool 7 Macau, China	Pool 8 Netherlands
Italy; United States; Dominican Republic; Serbia	Turkey; Germany; Russia; Japan	China; Belgium; Thailand; South Korea	Netherlands; Brazil; Poland; Bulgaria
Week 3
Pool 9 Hong Kong, China	Pool 10 United States	Pool 11 Thailand	Pool 12 Belgium
China; Italy; Japan; Netherlands	United States; South Korea; Germany; Brazil	Thailand; Bulgaria; Dominican Republic; Turkey	Belgium; Serbia; Russia; Poland
Week 4
Pool 13 Italy	Pool 14 Germany	Pool 15 Japan	Pool 16 China
Italy; South Korea; Bulgaria; Russia	Germany; Belgium; Netherlands; Dominican Republic	Japan; Serbia; Thailand; Brazil	China; United States; Poland; Turkey
Week 5
Pool 17 Turkey	Pool 18 China	Pool 19 Russia	Pool 20 South Korea
Turkey; Belgium; Italy; Brazil	China; Germany; Bulgaria; Serbia	Russia; Thailand; Netherlands; United States	South Korea; Japan; Poland; Dominican Republic

=== Final round ===
Pool A	Pool B
China (Host),(1)	United States (2)
Italy (4)	Brazil (3)
Turkey (5)	Poland (6)

== Venues ==
The list of host cities and venues was announced on March 26, 2019.

=== Preliminary round ===
Week 1
Pool 1	Pool 2	Pool 3	Pool 4
Opole, Poland	Ruse, Bulgaria	Brasília, Brazil	Belgrade, Serbia
Stegu Arena	Arena Ruse	Nilson Nelson Gymnasium	Aleksandar Nikolić Hall
Capacity: 3,378	Capacity: 5,100	Capacity: 12,000	Capacity: 5,878
Week 2
Pool 5	Pool 6	Pool 7	Pool 8
Conegliano, Italy	Ankara, Turkey	Macau, China	Apeldoorn, Netherlands
Zoppas Arena	Başkent Volleyball Hall	Macau Forum	Omnisport Apeldoorn
Capacity: 4,000	Capacity: 7,600	Capacity: 4,000	Capacity: 5,400
Week 3
Pool 9	Pool 10	Pool 11	Pool 12
Hong Kong, China	Lincoln, United States	Bangkok, Thailand	Kortrijk, Belgium
Hong Kong Coliseum	Pinnacle Bank Arena	Indoor Stadium Huamark	Lange Munte
Capacity: 12,500	Capacity: 15,290	Capacity: 15,000	Capacity: 1,600
Week 4
Pool 13	Pool 14	Pool 15	Pool 16
Perugia, Italy	Stuttgart, Germany	Tokyo, Japan	Jiangmen, China
PalaEvangelisti	Porsche-Arena	Musashino Forest Sport Plaza	Jiangmen Sports Hall
Capacity: 4,500	Capacity: 2,000	Capacity: 10,000	Capacity: 8,500
Week 5
Pool 17	Pool 18	Pool 19	Pool 20
Ankara, Turkey	Ningbo, China	Yekaterinburg, Russia	Boryeong, South Korea
Başkent Volleyball Hall	Beilun Gymnasium	Team Sports Palace	Boryeong Gymnasium
Capacity: 7,600	Capacity: 8,000	Capacity: 5,000	Capacity: 2,742

=== Final round ===
Nanjing, China
Nanjing Olympic Sports Center Gymnasium
Capacity: 13,000
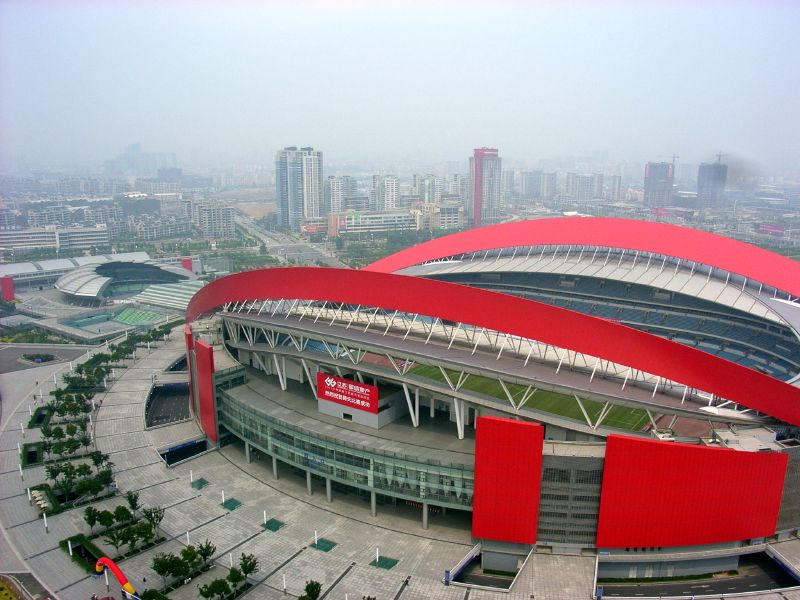

== Competition schedule ==
●	Preliminary round	●	Final round

Week 1 21–23 May	Week 2 28–30 May	Week 3 4–6 Jun	Week 4 11–13 Jun	Week 5 18–20 Jun	Week 6 Rest Week	Week 7 3–7 Jul
24 matches	24 matches	24 matches	24 matches	24 matches		10 matches

== Pool standing procedure ==
1. Total number of victories (matches won, matches lost)
2. In the event of a tie, the following first tiebreaker will apply: The teams will be ranked by the most point gained per match as follows:
  - Match won 3–0 or 3–1: 3 points for the winner, 0 points for the loser
  - Match won 3–2: 2 points for the winner, 1 point for the loser
  - Match forfeited: 3 points for the winner, 0 points (0–25, 0–25, 0–25) for the loser
3. If teams are still tied after examining the number of victories and points gained, then the FIVB will examine the results in order to break the tie in the following order:
  - Set quotient: if two or more teams are tied on the number of points gained, they will be ranked by the quotient resulting from the division of the number of all set won by the number of all sets lost.
  - Points quotient: if the tie persists based on the set quotient, the teams will be ranked by the quotient resulting from the division of all points scored by the total of points lost during all sets.
  - If the tie persists based on the point quotient, the tie will be broken based on the team that won the match of the Round Robin Phase between the tied teams. When the tie in point quotient is between three or more teams, these teams ranked taking into consideration only the matches involving the teams in question.

== Preliminary round ==
=== Ranking ===
Pos	Team	Pld	W	L	Pts	SW	SL	SR	SPW	SPL	SPR	Qualification or relegation
1	China (Note: Qualified as hosts)	15	12	3	35	37	12	3.083	1153	973	1.185	Final round
2	United States	15	12	3	35	39	17	2.294	1283	1137	1.128	Final round
3	Brazil	15	11	4	35	40	16	2.500	1318	1150	1.146	Final round
4	Italy	15	11	4	34	39	21	1.857	1375	1233	1.115	Final round
5	Turkey	15	11	4	32	36	18	2.000	1259	1109	1.135	Final round
6	Poland	15	9	6	26	33	29	1.138	1360	1354	1.004	Final round
7	Belgium	15	8	7	22	28	29	0.966	1208	1260	0.959	
8	Dominican Republic	15	8	7	21	31	33	0.939	1422	1437	0.990	
9	Japan	15	7	8	22	27	27	1.000	1225	1213	1.010	
10	Germany	15	7	8	21	24	29	0.828	1169	1180	0.991	
11	Netherlands	15	6	9	20	27	30	0.900	1206	1259	0.958	
12	Thailand	15	5	10	16	17	33	0.515	1046	1170	0.894	
13	Serbia	15	5	10	15	20	33	0.606	1132	1210	0.936	
14	Russia	15	3	12	10	16	38	0.421	1112	1283	0.867	
15	South Korea	15	3	12	9	16	37	0.432	1092	1222	0.894	
16	Bulgaria	15	2	13	7	13	41	0.317	1126	1296	0.869	Excluded from 2020 Nations League

Source: VNL 2019 standings

=== Week 1 ===
==== Pool 1 ====
- All times are Central European Summer Time (UTC+02:00).

Date	Time		Score		Set 1	Set 2	Set 3	Set 4	Set 5	Total	Report
21 May	17:30	Thailand	3–0	Germany	26–24	25–19	25–22			76–65	P2
21 May	20:30	Poland	2–3	Italy	15–25	22–25	25–18	25–21	15–17	102–106	P2
22 May	17:30	Thailand	0–3	Italy	13–25	17–25	24–26			54–76	P2
22 May	20:30	Poland	3–1	Germany	25–21	23–25	25–23	26–24		99–93	P2
23 May	17:30	Italy	3–0	Germany	25–19	26–24	27–25			78–68	P2
23 May	20:30	Thailand	0–3	Poland	20–25	20–25	13–25			53–75	P2

==== Pool 2 ====
- All times are Eastern European Summer Time (UTC+03:00).

Date	Time		Score		Set 1	Set 2	Set 3	Set 4	Set 5	Total	Report
21 May	17:00	Belgium	0–3	United States	23–25	8–25	22–25			53–75	P2
21 May	20:30	Bulgaria	1–3	Japan	23–25	25–21	19–25	23–25		90–96	P2
22 May	17:00	Japan	1–3	United States	21–25	26–24	21–25	20–25		88–99	P2
22 May	20:30	Bulgaria	2–3	Belgium	25–19	25–15	22–25	16–25	13–15	101–99	P2
23 May	17:00	Belgium	3–1	Japan	22–25	25–20	25–23	25–18		97–86	P2
23 May	20:30	United States	3–0	Bulgaria	25–20	25–16	25–21			75–57	P2

==== Pool 3 ====
- All times are Brasília time (UTC−03:00).

Date	Time		Score		Set 1	Set 2	Set 3	Set 4	Set 5	Total	Report
21 May	17:00	Dominican Republic	3–1	Russia	25–21	22–25	25–18	28–26		100–90	P2
21 May	20:00	Brazil	3–0	China	25–15	25–21	25–21			75–57	P2
22 May	17:00	China	1–3	Russia	22–25	25–16	16–25	23–25		86–91	P2
22 May	20:00	Brazil	1–3	Dominican Republic	22–25	20–25	25–22	26–28		93–100	P2
23 May	17:00	China	3–1	Dominican Republic	16–25	25–23	25–23	25–23		91–94	P2
23 May	20:00	Brazil	3–0	Russia	25–15	25–17	25–14			75–46	P2

==== Pool 4 ====
- All times are Central European Summer Time (UTC+02:00).

Date	Time		Score		Set 1	Set 2	Set 3	Set 4	Set 5	Total	Report
21 May	17:00	South Korea	0–3	Turkey	15–25	26–28	19–25			60–78	P2
21 May	20:00	Serbia	3–0	Netherlands	25–15	25–22	25–19			75–56	P2
22 May	17:00	Serbia	3–1	South Korea	15–25	25–18	25–17	25–14		90–74	P2
22 May	20:00	Netherlands	1–3	Turkey	22–25	14–25	25–21	15–25		76–96	P2
23 May	17:00	Netherlands	3–0	South Korea	25–18	25–21	25–18			75–57	P2
23 May	20:00	Turkey	3–0	Serbia	25–19	25–23	25–20			75–62	P2

=== Week 2 ===
==== Pool 5 ====
- All times are Central European Summer Time (UTC+02:00).

Date	Time		Score		Set 1	Set 2	Set 3	Set 4	Set 5	Total	Report
28 May	17:00	United States	3–1	Serbia	23–25	25–16	25–15	25–21		98–77	P2
28 May	20:00	Italy	3–1	Dominican Republic	25–18	27–25	18–25	25–20		95–88	P2
29 May	17:00	Serbia	3–1	Dominican Republic	25–17	18–25	25–12	25–19		93–73	P2
29 May	20:00	United States	3–2	Italy	25–22	17–25	23–25	25–19	15–11	105–102	P2
30 May	17:00	Dominican Republic	3–2	United States	25–10	16–25	25–19	19–25	15–11	100–90	P2
30 May	20:00	Serbia	1–3	Italy	27–25	17–25	25–27	23–25		92–102	P2

==== Pool 6 ====
- All times are Further-eastern European Time (UTC+03:00).

Date	Time		Score		Set 1	Set 2	Set 3	Set 4	Set 5	Total	Report
28 May	14:30	Russia	0–3	Germany	14–25	21–25	20–25			55–75	P2
28 May	17:30	Turkey	0–3	Japan	23–25	22–25	14–25			59–75	P2
29 May	14:30	Japan	3–1	Russia	25–22	23–25	25–18	26–24		99–89	P2
29 May	17:30	Germany	0–3	Turkey	21–25	16–25	15–25			52–75	P2
30 May	14:30	Japan	3–0	Germany	25–23	25–19	25–17			75–59	P2
30 May	17:30	Turkey	3–0	Russia	25–19	25–21	25–20			75–60	P2

==== Pool 7 ====
- All times are Macau Standard Time (UTC+08:00).

Date	Time		Score		Set 1	Set 2	Set 3	Set 4	Set 5	Total	Report
28 May	15:30	Belgium	0–3	South Korea	15–25	17–25	21–25			53–75	P2
28 May	19:30	China	3–0	Thailand	25–21	25–17	25–9			75–47	P2
29 May	16:30	South Korea	1–3	Thailand	21–25	25–19	19–25	20–25		85–94	P2
29 May	19:30	China	3–0	Belgium	25–16	25–20	25–14			75–50	P2
30 May	16:30	Belgium	3–0	Thailand	25–21	25–22	25–23			75–66	P2
30 May	19:30	China	3–0	South Korea	25–21	25–12	25–11			75–44	P2

==== Pool 8 ====
- All times are Central European Summer Time (UTC+02:00).

Date	Time		Score		Set 1	Set 2	Set 3	Set 4	Set 5	Total	Report
28 May	16:30	Bulgaria	1–3	Poland	25–23	21–25	21–25	17–25		84–98	P2
28 May	19:30	Netherlands	2–3	Brazil	25–21	28–30	20–25	25–18	11–15	109–109	P2
29 May	16:30	Poland	3–2	Brazil	25–20	25–22	26–28	18–25	15–9	109–104	P2
29 May	19:30	Netherlands	3–1	Bulgaria	22–25	25–22	25–20	25–19		97–86	P2
30 May	16:30	Poland	3–1	Netherlands	25–13	25–27	25–20	25–15		100–75	P2
30 May	19:30	Brazil	3–0	Bulgaria	25–18	25–23	25–18			75–59	P2

=== Week 3 ===
==== Pool 9 ====
- All times are Hong Kong Time (UTC+08:00).

Date	Time		Score		Set 1	Set 2	Set 3	Set 4	Set 5	Total	Report
4 June	17:30	Netherlands	1–3	Italy	13–25	25–22	19–25	16–25		73–97	P2
4 June	20:30	China	3–0	Japan	27–25	25–18	25–21			77–64	P2
5 June	17:30	Italy	3–0	Japan	25–21	25–16	25–22			75–59	P2
5 June	20:30	Netherlands	0–3	China	16–25	19–25	19–25			54–75	P2
6 June	17:30	Japan	3–0	Netherlands	25–17	25–17	25–21			75–55	P2
6 June	20:30	China	3–2	Italy	18–25	22–25	25–23	26–24	15–13	106–110	P2

==== Pool 10 ====
- All times are Central Summer Time (UTC−05:00).

Date	Time		Score		Set 1	Set 2	Set 3	Set 4	Set 5	Total	Report
4 June	16:30	Brazil	2–3	Germany	25–21	29–31	25–21	20–25	13–15	112–113	P2
4 June	19:30	United States	3–1	South Korea	19–25	25–15	25–22	25–19		94–81	P2
5 June	16:30	South Korea	0–3	Brazil	17–25	16–25	11–25			44–75	P2
5 June	19:30	United States	3–0	Germany	25–18	25–22	25–18			75–58	P2
6 June	16:30	Germany	3–0	South Korea	25–15	25–22	25–16			75–53	P2
6 June	19:30	United States	1–3	Brazil	19–25	17–25	25–22	20–25		81–97	P2

==== Pool 11 ====
- All times are Thailand Standard Time (UTC+07:00).

Date	Time		Score		Set 1	Set 2	Set 3	Set 4	Set 5	Total	Report
4 June	15:05	Dominican Republic	1–3	Turkey	20–25	21–25	26–24	18–25		85–99	P2
4 June	18:05	Thailand	3–1	Bulgaria	25–27	25–20	25–22	25–22		100–91	P2
5 June	15:05	Bulgaria	0–3	Turkey	14–25	9–25	23–25			46–75	P2
5 June	18:05	Thailand	2–3	Dominican Republic	29–31	25–13	28–30	25–20	14–16	121–110	P2
6 June	15:05	Bulgaria	1–3	Dominican Republic	20–25	21–25	31–29	20–25		92–104	P2
6 June	18:05	Thailand	0–3	Turkey	16–25	18–25	13–25			47–75	P2

==== Pool 12 ====
- All times are Central European Summer Time (UTC+02:00).

Date	Time		Score		Set 1	Set 2	Set 3	Set 4	Set 5	Total	Report
4 June	17:15	Serbia	3–0	Poland	27–25	25–21	25–22			77–68	P2
4 June	20:15	Belgium	3–0	Russia	25–22	25–20	25–22			75–64	P2
5 June	17:15	Russia	1–3	Serbia	25–22	18–25	11–25	22–25		76–97	P2
5 June	20:15	Belgium	1–3	Poland	22–25	25–21	18–25	23–25		88–96	P2
6 June	17:15	Poland	3–2	Russia	25–23	24–26	25–27	25–20	15–9	114–105	P2
6 June	20:15	Belgium	3–0	Serbia	25–21	25–21	25–14			75–56	P2

=== Week 4 ===
==== Pool 13 ====
- All times are Central European Summer Time (UTC+02:00).

Date	Time		Score		Set 1	Set 2	Set 3	Set 4	Set 5	Total	Report
11 June	17:00	Russia	3–1	South Korea	25–23	15–25	25–20	25–17		90–85	P2
11 June	20:00	Italy	3–0	Bulgaria	25–19	25–23	25–20			75–62	P2
12 June	17:00	Bulgaria	0–3	Russia	20–25	23–25	16–25			59–75	P2
12 June	20:00	Italy	3–1	South Korea	25–17	25–21	23–25	25–13		98–76	P2
13 June	17:00	South Korea	1–3	Bulgaria	25–20	23–25	19–25	24–26		91–96	P2
13 June	20:00	Italy	3–1	Russia	22–25	25–21	25–15	25-21		97–61	P2

==== Pool 14 ====
- All times are Central European Summer Time (UTC+02:00).

Date	Time		Score		Set 1	Set 2	Set 3	Set 4	Set 5	Total	Report
11 June	17:30	Belgium	3–2	Netherlands	22–25	23–25	25–17	25–19	15–10	110–96	P2
11 June	20:00	Germany	3–1	Dominican Republic	25–19	14–25	25–19	25–21		89–84	P2
12 June	17:30	Dominican Republic	0–3	Netherlands	18–25	21–25	19–25			58–75	P2
12 June	20:00	Germany	3–1	Belgium	25–21	25–23	24–26	25–16		99–86	P2
13 June	17:30	Belgium	2–3	Dominican Republic	25–21	22–25	25–21	14–25	11–15	97–107	P2
13 June	20:00	Germany	2–3	Netherlands	25–21	23–25	25–20	13–25	14–16	100–107	P2

==== Pool 15 ====
- All times are Japan Standard Time (UTC+09:00).

Date	Time		Score		Set 1	Set 2	Set 3	Set 4	Set 5	Total	Report
11 June	15:40	Serbia	0–3	Thailand	22–25	23–25	21–25			66–75	P2
11 June	19:10	Japan	1–3	Brazil	17–25	19–25	25–20	22–25		83–95	P2
12 June	15:40	Brazil	3–0	Thailand	25–19	25–17	25–21			75–57	P2
12 June	19:10	Japan	3–1	Serbia	19–25	25–14	25–23	25–14		94–76	P2
13 June	15:40	Brazil	3–0	Serbia	25–23	25–21	25–15			75–59	P2
13 June	19:10	Japan	3–0	Thailand	25–22	25–22	25–14			75–58	P2

==== Pool 16 ====
- All times are China Standard Time (UTC+08:00).

Date	Time		Score		Set 1	Set 2	Set 3	Set 4	Set 5	Total	Report
11 June	16:00	United States	0–3	Turkey	15–25	17–25	25–27			57–77	P2
11 June	20:00	China	3–0	Poland	25–12	25–18	25–22			75–52	P2
12 June	16:00	Poland	1–3	United States	25–21	23–25	15–25	11–25		74–96	P2
12 June	20:00	China	3–0	Turkey	26–24	25–19	25–21			76–64	P2
13 June	16:00	Turkey	3–2	Poland	22–25	18–25	25–16	25–20	15–12	105–98	P2
13 June	20:00	China	0–3	United States	17–25	22–25	21–25			60–75	P2

=== Week 5 ===
==== Pool 17 ====
- All times are Further-eastern European Time (UTC+03:00).

Date	Time		Score		Set 1	Set 2	Set 3	Set 4	Set 5	Total	Report
18 June	16:00	Brazil	3–0	Italy	25–21	25–20	25–23			75–64	P2
18 June	19:00	Turkey	1–3	Belgium	27–25	24–26	21–25	23–25		95–101	P2
19 June	16:00	Belgium	0–3	Brazil	23–25	15–25	18–25			56–75	P2
19 June	19:00	Italy	3–2	Turkey	25–19	17–25	23–25	25–15	16–14	106–98	P2
20 June	16:00	Belgium	3–2	Italy	12–25	25–20	16–25	25–14	15–10	93–94	P2
20 June	19:00	Turkey	3–2	Brazil	25–23	24–26	25–20	23–25	16–14	113–108	P2

==== Pool 18 ====
- All times are China Standard Time (UTC+08:00).

Date	Time		Score		Set 1	Set 2	Set 3	Set 4	Set 5	Total	Report
18 June	16:00	Bulgaria	3–1	Serbia	21–25	25–21	25–17	25–23		96–86	P2
18 June	19:30	China	3–0	Germany	25–19	25–16	25–15			75–50	P2
19 June	16:00	Serbia	1–3	Germany	14–25	20–25	25–23	17–25		76–98	P2
19 June	19:30	China	3–0	Bulgaria	25–18	25–19	25–16			75–53	P2
20 June	16:00	Germany	3–0	Bulgaria	25–21	25–20	25–13			75–54	P2
20 June	19:30	China	3–0	Serbia	25–16	25–17	25–17			75–50	P2

==== Pool 19 ====
- All times are Yekaterinburg Time (UTC+05:00).

Date	Time		Score		Set 1	Set 2	Set 3	Set 4	Set 5	Total	Report
18 June	16:00	Netherlands	3–0	Thailand	25–18	25–20	25–16			75–54	P2
18 June	19:00	Russia	0–3	United States	23–25	17–25	18–25			58–75	P2
19 June	16:00	Netherlands	2–3	United States	21–25	25–23	25–22	26–28	9–15	106–113	P2
19 June	19:00	Russia	1–3	Thailand	25–19	13–25	17–25	22–25		77–94	P2
20 June	16:00	Thailand	0–3	United States	13–25	20–25	17–25			50–75	P2
20 June	19:00	Russia	0–3	Netherlands	12–25	25–27	17–25			54–77	P2

==== Pool 20 ====
- All times are Korea Standard Time (UTC+09:00).

Date	Time		Score		Set 1	Set 2	Set 3	Set 4	Set 5	Total	Report
18 June	16:00	Japan	1–3	Poland	23–25	23–25	25–19	22–25		93–94	P2
18 June	19:00	South Korea	1–3	Dominican Republic	19–25	25–20	24–26	28–30		96–101	P2
19 June	16:00	Poland	3–2	Dominican Republic	25–18	25–20	23–25	22–25	17–15	112–103	P2
19 June	19:00	South Korea	3–0	Japan	25–18	25–18	25–23			75–59	P2
20 June	16:00	Japan	2–3	Dominican Republic	17–25	23–25	26–24	28–26	10–15	104–115	P2
20 June	19:00	South Korea	3–1	Poland	25–8	22–25	25–20	25–16		97–69	P2

== Final round ==
- All times are China Standard Time (UTC+08:00).

=== Pool play ===
==== Pool A ====
Pos	Team	Pld	W	L	Pts	SW	SL	SR	SPW	SPL	SPR	Qualification
1	Turkey	2	2	0	6	6	1	6.000	172	145	1.186	Final four
2	China (H)	2	1	1	3	4	4	1.000	185	183	1.011	Final four
3	Italy	2	0	2	0	1	6	0.167	143	172	0.831	

(H) Host

Date	Time		Score		Set 1	Set 2	Set 3	Set 4	Set 5	Total	Report
03 Jul	19:30	China	1–3	Turkey	22–25	19–25	25–22	22–25		88–97	P2
04 Jul	19:30	Italy	0–3	Turkey	21–25	15–25	21–25			57–75	P2
05 Jul	19:30	China	3–1	Italy	25–17	25–22	22–25	25–22		97–86	P2

==== Pool B ====
Pos	Team	Pld	W	L	Pts	SW	SL	SR	SPW	SPL	SPR	Qualification
1	United States	2	2	0	6	6	2	3.000	192	163	1.178	Final four
2	Brazil	2	1	1	2	4	5	0.800	192	195	0.985	Final four
3	Poland	2	0	2	1	3	6	0.500	180	206	0.874	

Date	Time		Score		Set 1	Set 2	Set 3	Set 4	Set 5	Total	Report
03 Jul	15:00	United States	3–1	Poland	21–25	25–16	25–15	26–24		97–80	P2
04 Jul	15:00	Brazil	3–2	Poland	22–25	25–21	22–25	25–19	15–10	109–100	P2
05 Jul	15:00	United States	3–1	Brazil	25–18	25–19	20–25	25–21		95–83	P2

=== Final four ===
Semifinals
6 July
Turkey	0
Brazil	3
6 July
United States	3
China	1

Final
7 July
Brazil	2
United States	3
3rd place match
7 July
Turkey	1
China	3

==== Semi-finals ====
Date	Time		Score		Set 1	Set 2	Set 3	Set 4	Set 5	Total	Report
06 Jul	15:00	Turkey	0–3	Brazil	23–25	15–25	10–25			48–75	P2
06 Jul	19:30	United States	3–1	China	25–11	15–25	25–17	25–20		90–73	P2

==== Third place match ====
Date	Time		Score		Set 1	Set 2	Set 3	Set 4	Set 5	Total	Report
07 Jul	14:00	Turkey	1–3	China	23–25	15–25	25–20	21–25		84–95	P2

==== Final ====
Date	Time		Score		Set 1	Set 2	Set 3	Set 4	Set 5	Total	Report
07 Jul	19:30	Brazil	2–3	United States	25–20	25–22	15–25	21–25	13–15	99–107	P2

== Final standing ==
Rank	Team
1st place, gold medalist(s)	United States
2nd place, silver medalist(s)	Brazil
3rd place, bronze medalist(s)	China
4	Turkey
5	Poland
6	Italy
7	Belgium
8	Dominican Republic
9	Japan
10	Germany
11	Netherlands
12	Thailand
13	Serbia
14	Russia
15	South Korea
16	Bulgaria

Source: VNL 2019 final standings

2019 Women's VNL champions

United States
Second title

14–woman roster
Jordyn Poulter, TeTori Dixon, Lauren Carlini, Jordan Larson (c), Andrea Drews, Jordan Thompson, Michelle Bartsch-Hackley, Megan Courtney, Mikaela Foecke, Dana Rettke, Haleigh Washington, Kelsey Robinson, Chiaka Ogbogu, Mary Lake
Head coach
Karch Kiraly

== Awards ==
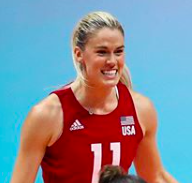
Annie Drews was the 2019 FIVB Nations League Most Valuable Player

- Most valuable player
  Annie Drews (USA)
- Best setter
  Macris Carneiro (BRA)
- Best outside hitters
  Gabriela Guimarães (BRA)
  Liu Yanhan (CHN)
- Best middle blockers
  Ana Beatriz Corrêa (BRA)
  Haleigh Washington (USA)
- Best Opposite
  Ebrar Karakurt (TUR)
- Best libero
  Megan Courtney (USA)

== Statistics leaders ==
=== Preliminary round ===
as of June 20, 2019

Best Scorers
	Player	Attacks	Blocks	Serves	Total
1	(Poland) Malwina Smarzek	376	34	11	421
2	(Turkey) Ebrar Karakurt	247	21	23	291
3	(Brazil) Gabriela Guimarães	241	29	8	278
4	(Dominican Republic) Brayelin Martínez	235	19	4	258
5	(Dominican Republic) Bethania de la Cruz	185	35	21	241

Best Attackers
	Player	Spikes	Faults	Shots	Total	%
1	(United States) Andrea Drews	205	68	153	426	48.12
2	(Dominican Republic) Brayelin Martínez	235	46	213	494	47.57
3	(Turkey) Ebrar Karakurt	247	94	197	538	45.91
4	(Italy) Elena Pietrini	199	63	174	436	45.64
5	(Brazil) Gabriela Guimarães	241	82	227	550	43.82

Best Blockers
	Player	Blocks	Faults	Rebounds	Total	Avg
1	(Serbia) Maja Aleksić	47	63	85	195	0.89
2	(Brazil) Ana Beatriz Corrêa	51	83	118	252	0.70
3	(Bulgaria) Mira Todorova	32	81	111	224	0.59
4	(Poland) Agnieszka Kąkolewska	41	93	96	230	0.58
5	(Bulgaria) Nasya Dimitrova	31	92	106	229	0.57

Best Servers
	Player	Aces	Faults	Hits	Total	Avg
1	(Belgium) Marlies Janssens	24	31	135	190	0.42
2	(Netherlands) Juliet Lohuis	24	13	160	197	0.42
3	(Turkey) Zehra Güneş	25	23	193	241	0.37
4	(Italy) Indre Sorokaite	24	40	115	179	0.36
5	(Turkey) Ebrar Karakurt	23	42	115	180	0.34

Best Setters
	Player	Running	Faults	Still	Total	Avg
1	(Thailand) Nootsara Tomkom	337	9	796	1142	6.74
2	(Japan) Miya Sato	316	11	822	1149	5.85
3	(Turkey) Cansu Özbay	351	18	992	1361	5.16
4	(Belgium) Ilka Van de Vyver	292	12	1053	1357	5.12
5	(Brazil) Macris Carneiro	360	10	1004	1374	4.93

Best Diggers
	Player	Digs	Faults	Receptions	Total	Avg
1	(Germany) Lenka Dürr	186	48	67	301	3.51
2	(Bulgaria) Zhana Todorova	184	65	73	322	3.41
3	(Japan) Mako Kobata	173	38	61	272	3.20
4	(Dominican Republic) Larysmer Martínez Caro	174	51	67	292	2.72
5	(Belgium) Celine Van Gestel	153	41	44	238	2.68

Best Receivers
	Player	Excellents	Faults	Serve	Total	%
1	(Brazil) Gabriela Guimarães	167	21	283	471	31.00
2	(Thailand) Piyanut Pannoy	71	11	139	221	27.15
3	(Brazil) Léia Silva	99	20	188	307	25.73
4	(Japan) Mako Kobata	69	15	146	230	23.48
5	(Germany) Lenka Dürr	74	14	169	257	23.35

=== Final round ===
as of July 7, 2019

Best Scorers
	Player	Spikes	Blocks	Serves	Total
1	(China) Liu Yanhan	70	5	5	80
2	(United States) Andrea Drews	69	4	4	77
3	(Turkey) Ebrar Karakurt	65	6	3	74
4	(Poland) Malwina Smarzek	52	4	0	56
5	(China) Gong Xiangyu	43	8	4	55

Best Attackers
	Player	Spikes	Faults	Shots	Total	%
1	(United States) Andrea Drews	69	18	45	132	52.27
2	(Poland) Malwina Smarzek	52	21	36	109	47.71
3	(United States) Kelsey Robinson	42	16	34	92	45.65
4	(Turkey) Ebrar Karakurt	65	28	51	144	45.14
5	(Turkey) Meliha İsmailoğlu	35	15	28	78	44.87

Best Blockers
	Player	Blocks	Faults	Rebounds	Total	Avg
1	(Poland) Agnieszka Kąkolewska	8	14	14	36	0.89
2	(Italy) Paola Egonu	6	5	8	19	0.86
3	(Poland) Zuzanna Efimienko	7	11	6	24	0.78
4	(Brazil) Ana Beatriz Corrêa	13	12	27	52	0.76
5	(Turkey) Kübra Akman	10	9	14	33	0.71

Best Servers
	Player	Aces	Faults	Hits	Total	Avg
1	(United States) Michelle Bartsch-Hackley	8	5	33	46	0.47
2	(Italy) Paola Egonu	3	9	12	24	0.43
3	(Turkey) Kübra Akman	6	2	42	50	0.43
4	(China) Liu Xiaotong	6	8	40	54	0.38
5	(Turkey) Zehra Güneş	5	5	33	43	0.36

Best Setters
	Player	Running	Faults	Still	Total	Avg
1	(United States) Lauren Carlini	91	4	276	371	5.35
2	(Turkey) Cansu Özbay	71	4	227	302	5.07
3	(Brazil) Macris Carneiro	70	1	254	325	4,12
4	(China) Yao Di	62	1	271	334	3.88
5	(Poland) Joanna Wołosz	33	2	180	215	3.67

Best Diggers
	Player	Digs	Faults	Receptions	Total	Avg
1	(Turkey) Simge Şebnem Aköz	52	10	13	75	3.71
2	(United States) Megan Courtney	59	12	19	90	3.47
3	(Italy) Monica De Gennaro	24	6	11	41	3.43
4	(Italy) Ofelia Malinov	18	1	7	26	2.57
5	(Brazil) Léia Silva	42	5	7	54	2.47

Best Receivers
	Player	Excellents	Faults	Serve	Total	%
1	(Brazil) Gabriela Guimarães	30	1	46	77	37.66
2	(Italy) Lucia Bosetti	11	0	22	33	33.33
3	(Turkey) Meliha İsmailoğlu	42	4	80	126	30.16
4	(United States) Megan Courtney	24	3	55	82	25.61
5	(United States) Michelle Bartsch-Hackley	17	5	61	83	14.46

== See also ==
- 2019 FIVB Volleyball Women's Challenger Cup
