= 2018 FIVB Women's Volleyball Nations League =

2018世界女排联赛 (Chinese); 2018 Shìjiè Nǚpái Liánsài

Tournament details
- Host country: China
- City: Nanjing (final round)
- Dates: 15 May – 1 July
- Teams: 16
- Venues: 21 (in 21 host cities)

Final positions
- Champions: United States (1st title)
- Runners-up: Turkey
- Third place: China
- Fourth place: Brazil
- Relegated: Argentina

Tournament awards
- MVP: (United States) Michelle Bartsch-Hackley
- Best Setter: (Turkey) Cansu Özbay
- Best OH: (United States) Michelle Bartsch-Hackley; (China) Zhu Ting
- Best MB: (United States) TeTori Dixon; (Turkey) Eda Erdem Dündar
- Best OPP: (Brazil) Tandara Caixeta
- Best Libero: (Brazil) Suelen Pinto

Tournament statistics
- Matches played: 130
- Attendance: 399,149 (3,070 per match)

The 2018 FIVB Women's Volleyball Nations League was the inaugural edition of the FIVB Women's Volleyball Nations League, a new annual international women's volleyball tournament contested by 16 national teams that replaced the former World Grand Prix in the international calendar. It was held between May and July 2018, and the final round took place at the Nanjing Olympic Sports Centre in Nanjing, China.

Six-time World Grand Prix winners, United States won the inaugural editions after defeating Turkey in the final. This was Turkey's first ever final on a senior world-level premier competition (World Championship, World Cup, Summer Olympic Games and the aforementioned Grand Prix). Reigning Olympic champions and host nation, China defeated 12-time Grand Prix champions Brazil in the third place match. Michelle Bartsch-Hackley was elected the MVP of the tournament.

Argentina was the last placed challenger team after the preliminary round and would be replaced by Challenger Cup winners Bulgaria in the 2019 edition.

== Teams ==
=== Qualification ===
Sixteen teams qualified for the competition. Twelve of them qualified as core teams which cannot face relegation. Other four teams were selected as challenger teams which could be relegated from the tournament.

Country	Confederation	Designation	Previous appearances			Previous best performance
Country	Confederation	Designation	Total	First	Last	Previous best performance
Argentina	CSV	Challenger team	0	None		Debut
Belgium	CEV	Challenger team	0	None		Debut
Brazil	CSV	Core team	0	None		Debut
China	AVC	Core team	0	None		Debut
Dominican Republic	NORCECA	Challenger team	0	None		Debut
Germany	CEV	Core team	0	None		Debut
Italy	CEV	Core team	0	None		Debut
Japan	AVC	Core team	0	None		Debut
Netherlands	CEV	Core team	0	None		Debut
Poland	CEV	Challenger team	0	None		Debut
Russia	CEV	Core team	0	None		Debut
Serbia	CEV	Core team	0	None		Debut
South Korea	AVC	Core team	0	None		Debut
Thailand	AVC	Core team	0	None		Debut
Turkey	CEV	Core team	0	None		Debut
United States	NORCECA	Core team	0	None		Debut

== Format ==
=== Preliminary round ===
The 16 teams compete in a round-robin format with every core team hosting a pool at least once. The teams are divided into 4 pools of 4 teams at each week and compete five weeks long, with a total of 120 matches. The top five teams after the league round join the hosts of the final round to compete in the final round. The relegation takes in consideration only the 4 challenger teams and the last ranked challenger team will be excluded from the 2019 Nations League. The winners of the Challenger Cup will qualify for the next edition as a challenger team.

=== Final round ===
The six qualified teams play in 2 pools of 3 teams in round-robin. The top 2 teams of each pool qualify for the semifinals. The pool winners play against the runners-up in this round. The semifinals winners advance to compete for the Nations League title. The losers face in the third place match.

== Pools composition ==
The overview of pools was released on February 16, 2018.

=== Preliminary round ===
Week 1
Pool 1 Russia	Pool 2 China	Pool 3 United States	Pool 4 Brazil
Russia; Argentina; Netherlands; Thailand	China; Belgium; Dominican Republic; South Korea	United States; Italy; Poland; Turkey	Brazil; Germany; Japan; Serbia
Week 2
Pool 5 Japan	Pool 6 South Korea	Pool 7 Macau, China	Pool 8 Turkey
Japan; Belgium; Netherlands; United States	South Korea; Germany; Italy; Russia	China; Poland; Serbia; Thailand	Turkey; Argentina; Brazil; Dominican Republic
Week 3
Pool 9 Netherlands	Pool 10 Serbia	Pool 11 Thailand	Pool 12 Hong Kong, China
Netherlands; Brazil; Poland; South Korea	Serbia; Belgium; Russia; Turkey	Thailand; Dominican Republic; Germany; United States	China; Argentina; Italy; Japan
Week 4
Pool 13 Netherlands	Pool 14 China	Pool 15 Thailand	Pool 16 Poland
Netherlands; Dominican Republic; Italy; Serbia	China; Brazil; Russia; United States	Thailand; Japan; South Korea; Turkey	Poland; Argentina; Belgium; Germany
Week 5
Pool 17 Germany	Pool 18 Poland	Pool 19 Italy	Pool 20 Argentina
Germany; China; Netherlands; Turkey	Poland; Dominican Republic; Japan; Russia	Italy; Belgium; Brazil; Thailand	Argentina; Serbia; South Korea; United States

=== Final round ===
Pool A	Pool B
China	United States
Brazil	Serbia
Netherlands	Turkey

== Venues ==
The list of host cities and venues was announced on February 16, 2018.

=== Preliminary round ===
Week 1
Pool 1	Pool 2	Pool 3	Pool 4
Yekaterinburg, Russia	Ningbo, China	Lincoln, United States	Barueri, Brazil
Team Sports Palace	Beilun Gymnasium	Bob Devaney Sports Center	Ginásio José Corrêa
Capacity: 5,000	Capacity: 8,000	Capacity: 7,907	Capacity: 5,100
Week 2
Pool 5	Pool 6	Pool 7	Pool 8
Toyota, Japan	Suwon, South Korea	Macau, China	Ankara, Turkey
Sky Hall Toyota	Suwon Gymnasium	Macau Forum	Başkent Volleyball Hall
Capacity: 6,500	Capacity: 5,145	Capacity: 4,062	Capacity: 7,600
Week 3
Pool 9	Pool 10	Pool 11	Pool 12
Apeldoorn, Netherlands	Kraljevo, Serbia	Bangkok, Thailand	Hong Kong, China
Omnisport Apeldoorn	Kraljevo Sports Hall	Indoor Stadium Huamark	Hong Kong Coliseum
Capacity: 5,000	Capacity: 3,331	Capacity: 10,000	Capacity: 12,500
Week 4
Pool 13	Pool 14	Pool 15	Pool 16
Rotterdam, Netherlands	Jiangmen, China	Nakhon Ratchasima, Thailand	Bydgoszcz, Poland
Topsportcentrum Rotterdam	Jiangmen Sports Hall	Korat Chatchai Hall	Łuczniczka
Capacity: 2,500	Capacity: 8,500	Capacity: 5,000	Capacity: 8,764
Week 5
Pool 17	Pool 18	Pool 19	Pool 20
Stuttgart, Germany	Wałbrzych, Poland	Eboli, Italy	Santa Fe, Argentina
Porsche-Arena	Centrum Sportowo-Rekreacyjne Aqua Zdrój	PalaSele	Gimnásio del Campus de la Universidad Tecnológica Nacional
Capacity: 6,181	Capacity: 2,000	Capacity: 8,000	Capacity: 5,000

=== Final round ===
Nanjing, China
Nanjing Olympic Sports Center Gymnasium
Capacity: 13,000
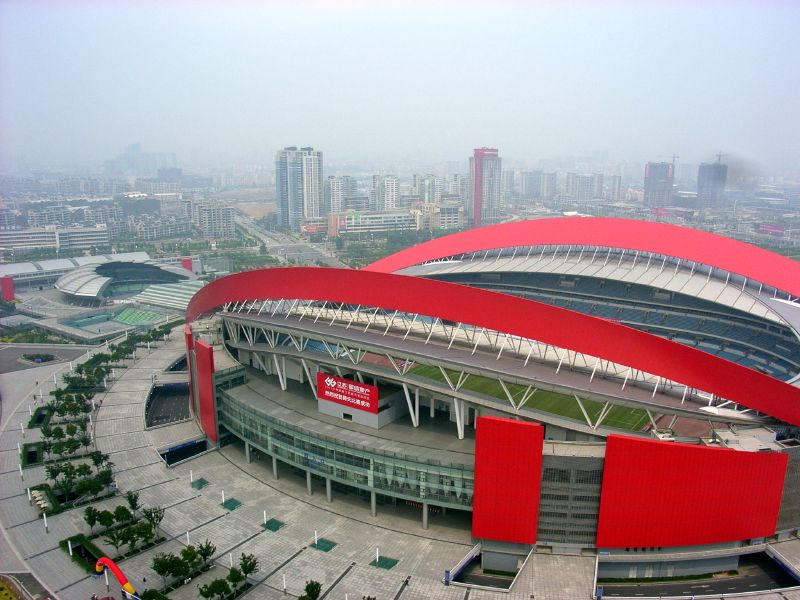

== Competition schedule ==
●	League round	●	Final round

Week 1 15–17 May	Week 2 22–24 May	Week 3 29–31 May	Week 4 5–7 Jun	Week 5 12–14 Jun	Week 6 Rest Week	Week 7 27 Jun – 1 Jul
24 matches	24 matches	24 matches	24 matches	24 matches		10 matches

== Pool standing procedure ==
1. Total number of victories (matches won, matched lost)
2. In the event of a tie, the following first tiebreaker will apply: The teams will be ranked by the most point gained per match as follows:
  - Match won 3–0 or 3–1: 3 points for the winner, 0 points for the loser
  - Match won 3–2: 2 points for the winner, 1 point for the loser
  - Match forfeited: 3 points for the winner, 0 points (0–25, 0–25, 0–25) for the loser
3. If teams are still tied after examining the number of victories and points gained, then the FIVB will examine the results in order to break the tie in the following order:
  - Set quotient: if two or more teams are tied on the number of points gained, they will be ranked by the quotient resulting from the division of the number of all set won by the number of all sets lost.
  - Points quotient: if the tie persists based on the set quotient, the teams will be ranked by the quotient resulting from the division of all points scored by the total of points lost during all sets.
  - If the tie persists based on the point quotient, the tie will be broken based on the team that won the match of the Round Robin Phase between the tied teams. When the tie in point quotient is between three or more teams, these teams ranked taking into consideration only the matches involving the teams in question.

== Preliminary round ==
=== Ranking ===
Pos	Team	Pld	W	L	Pts	SW	SL	SR	SPW	SPL	SPR	Qualification or relegation
1	United States	15	13	2	40	42	8	5.250	1227	997	1.231	Final round
2	Serbia	15	12	3	37	41	15	2.733	1324	1141	1.160	Final round
3	Brazil	15	12	3	35	40	20	2.000	1376	1229	1.120	Final round
4	Netherlands	15	12	3	34	39	18	2.167	1327	1176	1.128	Final round
5	Turkey	15	11	4	35	40	19	2.105	1351	1244	1.086	Final round
6	Italy	15	10	5	29	34	22	1.545	1230	1136	1.083	
7	Russia	15	8	7	23	26	29	0.897	1194	1198	0.997	
8	Poland	15	8	7	22	29	29	1.000	1298	1211	1.072	
9	China (Note: Qualified as hosts)	15	7	8	22	29	27	1.074	1237	1178	1.050	Final round
10	Japan	15	7	8	20	27	31	0.871	1209	1273	0.950	
11	Germany	15	5	10	15	23	35	0.657	1220	1315	0.928	
12	South Korea	15	5	10	14	16	34	0.471	1022	1141	0.896	
13	Belgium	15	4	11	12	18	36	0.500	1115	1250	0.892	
14	Dominican Republic	15	3	12	12	17	37	0.459	1072	1245	0.861	
15	Thailand	15	2	13	7	17	41	0.415	1218	1355	0.899	
16	Argentina	15	1	14	3	5	42	0.119	830	1161	0.715	Excluded from 2019 Nations League

Source: VNL 2018 standings

=== Week 1 ===
==== Pool 1 ====
- All times are Yekaterinburg Time (UTC+05:00).

Date	Time		Score		Set 1	Set 2	Set 3	Set 4	Set 5	Total	Report
15 May	16:30	Thailand	0–3	Netherlands	20–25	24–26	13–25			57–76	P2
15 May	19:00	Russia	3–1	Argentina	20–25	25–13	25–13	25–22		95–73	P2
16 May	16:30	Argentina	1–3	Netherlands	25–22	19–25	8–25	18–25		70–97	P2
16 May	19:00	Russia	3–1	Thailand	25–23	13–25	25–18	30–28		93–94	P2
17 May	16:30	Argentina	0–3	Thailand	17–25	17–25	16–25			50–75	P2
17 May	19:00	Russia	0–3	Netherlands	22–25	20–25	25–27			67–77	P2

==== Pool 2 ====
- All times are China Standard Time (UTC+08:00).

Date	Time		Score		Set 1	Set 2	Set 3	Set 4	Set 5	Total	Report
15 May	16:00	Belgium	3–0	South Korea	25–18	25–22	25–21			75–61	P2
15 May	19:30	China	3–0	Dominican Republic	25–17	25–15	25–11			75–43	P2
16 May	16:00	Dominican Republic	2–3	South Korea	24–26	27–25	25–21	14–25	12–15	102–112	P2
16 May	19:30	China	3–0	Belgium	25–14	25–20	25–13			75–47	P2
17 May	16:00	Dominican Republic	2–3	Belgium	16–25	25–18	18–25	25–19	7–15	91–102	P2
17 May	19:30	China	0–3	South Korea	15–25	15–25	13–25			43–75	P2

==== Pool 3 ====
- All times are Central Summer Time (UTC-05:00).

Date	Time		Score		Set 1	Set 2	Set 3	Set 4	Set 5	Total	Report
15 May	17:00	Turkey	3–0	Italy	25–21	25–21	25–20			75–62	P2
15 May	19:30	United States	3–1	Poland	28–26	25–22	22–25	25–15		100–88	P2
16 May	17:00	Poland	3–2	Italy	21–25	25–14	19–25	25–17	15–12	105–93	P2
16 May	19:30	United States	2–3	Turkey	26–28	19–25	25–20	26–24	14–16	110–113	P2
17 May	17:00	Turkey	3–0	Poland	25–21	25–17	25–23			75–61	P2
17 May	19:30	United States	3–0	Italy	25–21	25–18	25–21			75–60	P2

==== Pool 4 ====
- All times are Brasília time (UTC−03:00).

Date	Time		Score		Set 1	Set 2	Set 3	Set 4	Set 5	Total	Report
15 May	15:05	Brazil	1–3	Germany	25–15	22–25	18–25	20–25		85–90	P2
15 May	17:30	Japan	0–3	Serbia	18–25	17–25	22–25			57–75	P2
16 May	15:05	Brazil	3–1	Japan	22–25	25–18	25–23	25–11		97–77	P2
16 May	17:30	Germany	0–3	Serbia	16–25	21–25	17–25			54–75	P2
17 May	15:05	Brazil	3–1	Serbia	23–25	25–22	25–14	25–21		98–82	P2
17 May	17:30	Germany	1–3	Japan	21–25	23–25	25–21	17–25		86–96	P2

=== Week 2 ===
==== Pool 5 ====
- All times are Japan Standard Time (UTC+09:00).

Date	Time		Score		Set 1	Set 2	Set 3	Set 4	Set 5	Total	Report
22 May	15:40	Belgium	2–3	Netherlands	25–21	19–25	25–23	29–31	10–15	108–115	P2
22 May	19:10	Japan	0–3	United States	20–25	16–25	23–25			59–75	P2
23 May	15:40	Netherlands	0–3	United States	19–25	21–25	23–25			63–75	P2
23 May	19:10	Japan	3–0	Belgium	25–19	25–20	25–19			75–58	P2
24 May	15:40	Belgium	0–3	United States	11–25	18–25	17–25			46–75	P2
24 May	19:10	Japan	0–3	Netherlands	18–25	18–25	21–25			57–75	P2

==== Pool 6 ====
- All times are Korea Standard Time (UTC+09:00).

Date	Time		Score		Set 1	Set 2	Set 3	Set 4	Set 5	Total	Report
22 May	15:00	Italy	0–3	Russia	24–26	12–25	23–25			59–76	P2
22 May	18:00	South Korea	3–1	Germany	23–25	26–24	25–16	25–16		99–81	P2
23 May	16:00	Italy	3–0	Germany	25–22	25–18	25–20			75–60	P2
23 May	19:00	South Korea	3–0	Russia	25–19	25–14	25–17			75–50	P2
24 May	16:00	Germany	1–3	Russia	25–19	21–25	15–25	23–25		84–94	P2
24 May	19:00	South Korea	0–3	Italy	17–25	21–25	21–25			59–75	P2

==== Pool 7 ====
- All times are Macau Standard Time (UTC+08:00).

Date	Time		Score		Set 1	Set 2	Set 3	Set 4	Set 5	Total	Report
22 May	16:30	Thailand	1–3	Serbia	18–25	23–25	25–19	19–25		85–94	P2
22 May	20:00	China	2–3	Poland	25–18	17–25	18–25	25–22	12–15	97–105	P2
23 May	17:30	Poland	1–3	Serbia	25–20	25–27	24–26	15–25		89–98	P2
23 May	20:00	China	3–1	Thailand	25–23	26–24	22–25	25–17		98–89	P2
24 May	17:30	Poland	2–3	Thailand	22–25	25–21	23–25	25–21	14–16	109–108	P2
24 May	20:00	China	1–3	Serbia	25–21	23–25	21–25	17–25		86–96	P2

==== Pool 8 ====
- All times are Further-eastern European Time (UTC+03:00).

Date	Time		Score		Set 1	Set 2	Set 3	Set 4	Set 5	Total	Report
22 May	14:00	Argentina	0–3	Dominican Republic	24–26	24–26	19–25			67–77	P2
22 May	17:00	Turkey	1–3	Brazil	17–25	19–25	25–23	21–25		82–98	P2
23 May	14:00	Brazil	3–0	Argentina	25–9	25–21	25–14			75–44	P2
23 May	17:00	Turkey	3–1	Dominican Republic	25–20	17–25	25–20	25–19		92–84	P2
24 May	14:00	Dominican Republic	0–3	Brazil	20–25	10–25	13–25			43–75	P2
24 May	17:00	Turkey	3–0	Argentina	25–16	25–16	25–19			75–51	P2

=== Week 3 ===
==== Pool 9 ====
- All times are Central European Summer Time (UTC+02:00).

Date	Time		Score		Set 1	Set 2	Set 3	Set 4	Set 5	Total	Report
29 May	16:30	South Korea	1–3	Brazil	11–25	14–25	33–31	20–25		78–106	P2
29 May	19:30	Netherlands	3–0	Poland	25–22	25–22	27–25			77–69	P2
30 May	16:30	Poland	0–3	Brazil	20–25	20–25	23–25			63–75	P2
30 May	19:30	Netherlands	3–0	South Korea	25–18	25–10	25–12			75–40	P2
31 May	16:30	South Korea	0–3	Poland	11–25	15–25	16–25			42–75	P2
31 May	19:30	Netherlands	1–3	Brazil	23–25	24–26	25–13	22–25		94–89	P2

==== Pool 10 ====
- All times are Central European Summer Time (UTC+02:00).

Date	Time		Score		Set 1	Set 2	Set 3	Set 4	Set 5	Total	Report
29 May	17:00	Belgium	0–3	Turkey	19–25	18–25	24–26			61–76	P2
29 May	20:00	Serbia	3–0	Russia	25–23	25–19	25–18			75–60	P2
30 May	16:00	Turkey	2–3	Russia	23–25	25–19	25–23	20–25	11–15	104–107	P2
30 May	19:00	Belgium	0–3	Serbia	20–25	16–25	14–25			50–75	P2
31 May	17:00	Russia	3–1	Belgium	25–21	25–20	23–25	25–18		98–84	P2
31 May	20:00	Turkey	2–3	Serbia	20–25	25–22	25–18	23–25	12–15	105–105	P2

==== Pool 11 ====
- All times are Indochina Time (UTC+07:00).

Date	Time		Score		Set 1	Set 2	Set 3	Set 4	Set 5	Total	Report
29 May	15:05	Germany	0–3	United States	18–25	17–25	17–25			52–75	P2
29 May	18:05	Thailand	0–3	Dominican Republic	21–25	22–25	20–25			63–75	P2
30 May	15:05	Dominican Republic	0–3	United States	20–25	23–25	21–25			64–75	P2
30 May	18:05	Thailand	2–3	Germany	23–25	26–28	25–23	25–22	10–15	109–113	P2
31 May	15:05	Dominican Republic	1–3	Germany	22–25	15–25	25–21	12–25		74–96	P2
31 May	18:05	Thailand	0–3	United States	10–25	22–25	16–25			48–75	P2

==== Pool 12 ====
- All times are Hong Kong Time (UTC+08:00).

Date	Time		Score		Set 1	Set 2	Set 3	Set 4	Set 5	Total	Report
29 May	18:00	Japan	3–2	Italy	20–25	25–23	20–25	25–23	15–11	105–107	P2
29 May	20:30	China	3–0	Argentina	25–22	25–16	25–12			75–50	P2
30 May	18:00	Argentina	0–3	Italy	15–25	16–25	18–25			49–75	P2
30 May	20:30	China	3–0	Japan	25–21	25–19	25–17			75–57	P2
31 May	18:00	Japan	3–0	Argentina	25–16	25–21	25–21			75–58	P2
31 May	20:30	China	1–3	Italy	18–25	14–25	25–16	18–25		75–91	P2

=== Week 4 ===
==== Pool 13 ====
- All times are Central European Summer Time (UTC+02:00).

Date	Time		Score		Set 1	Set 2	Set 3	Set 4	Set 5	Total	Report
5 Jun	16:30	Italy	3–2	Serbia	19–25	25–21	25–21	18–25	15–13	102–105	P2
5 Jun	19:30	Netherlands	3–0	Dominican Republic	25–22	25–21	25–18			75–61	P2
6 Jun	16:30	Serbia	3–0	Dominican Republic	25–19	25–20	25–13			75–52	P2
6 Jun	19:30	Netherlands	2–3	Italy	25–18	23–25	25–19	15–25	8–15	96–102	P2
7 Jun	16:30	Dominican Republic	0–3	Italy	18–25	15–25	20–25			53–75	P2
7 Jun	19:30	Netherlands	3–2	Serbia	15–25	19–25	29–27	25–17	20–18	108–112	P2

==== Pool 14 ====
- All times are China Standard Time (UTC+08:00).

Date	Time		Score		Set 1	Set 2	Set 3	Set 4	Set 5	Total	Report
5 Jun	16:00	Russia	0–3	United States	14–25	18–25	18–25			50–75	P2
5 Jun	19:30	China	2–3	Brazil	25–19	23–25	25–27	25–10	14–16	112–97	P2
6 Jun	16:00	United States	3–1	Brazil	25–23	26–28	25–21	25–18		101–90	P2
6 Jun	19:30	China	3–0	Russia	25–21	25–19	25–22			75–62	P2
7 Jun	16:00	Brazil	3–2	Russia	15–25	25–21	25–20	19–25	17–15	101–106	P2
7 Jun	19:30	China	0–3	United States	20–25	22–25	20–25			62–75	P2

==== Pool 15 ====
- All times are Indochina Time (UTC+07:00).

Date	Time		Score		Set 1	Set 2	Set 3	Set 4	Set 5	Total	Report
5 Jun	15:05	Japan	1–3	Turkey	17–25	23–25	25–13	11–25		76–88	P2
5 Jun	18:05	Thailand	1–3	South Korea	16–25	18–25	25–20	24–26		83–96	P2
6 Jun	15:05	Japan	3–0	South Korea	25–22	25–14	25–20			75–56	P2
6 Jun	18:05	Thailand	1–3	Turkey	20–25	28–30	25–18	19–25		92–98	P2
7 Jun	15:05	South Korea	0–3	Turkey	19–25	21–25	23–25			63–75	P2
7 Jun	18:05	Thailand	2–3	Japan	25–19	25–20	17–25	19–25	20–22	106–111	P2

==== Pool 16 ====
- All times are Central European Summer Time (UTC+02:00).

Date	Time		Score		Set 1	Set 2	Set 3	Set 4	Set 5	Total	Report
5 Jun	17:30	Germany	3–1	Belgium	25–19	25–21	22–25	25–23		97–88	P2
5 Jun	20:30	Poland	3–0	Argentina	25–11	25–14	25–20			75–45	P2
6 Jun	17:30	Belgium	3–0	Argentina	25–22	25–16	25–14			75–52	P2
6 Jun	20:30	Poland	3–1	Germany	25–21	21–25	25–20	25–9		96–75	P2
7 Jun	17:30	Argentina	0–3	Germany	16–25	13–25	16–25			45–75	P2
7 Jun	20:30	Poland	3–1	Belgium	22–25	25–22	27–25	25–14		99–86	P2

=== Week 5 ===
==== Pool 17 ====
- All times are Central European Summer Time (UTC+02:00).

Date	Time		Score		Set 1	Set 2	Set 3	Set 4	Set 5	Total	Report
12 Jun	17:30	Turkey	2–3	Netherlands	11–25	29–31	25–16	25–20	10–15	100–107	P2
12 Jun	20:30	Germany	2–3	China	25–20	27–25	17–25	23–25	8–15	100–110	P2
13 Jun	17:30	China	1–3	Netherlands	24–26	25–17	17–25	21–25		87–93	P2
13 Jun	20:30	Germany	1–3	Turkey	16–25	15–25	25–20	19–25		75–95	P2
14 Jun	17:30	China	1–3	Turkey	26–28	21–25	25–20	20–25		92–98	P2
14 Jun	20:30	Germany	1–3	Netherlands	21–25	16–25	26–24	19–25		82–99	P2

==== Pool 18 ====
- All times are Central European Summer Time (UTC+02:00).

Date	Time		Score		Set 1	Set 2	Set 3	Set 4	Set 5	Total	Report
12 Jun	17:30	Russia	3–0	Dominican Republic	25–21	25–20	25–16			75–57	P2
12 Jun	20:30	Poland	3–2	Japan	18–25	25–15	25–16	21–25	16–14	105–95	P2
13 Jun	17:30	Dominican Republic	2–3	Japan	15–25	25–14	25–21	27–29	13–15	105–104	P2
13 Jun	20:30	Poland	3–0	Russia	25–21	25–18	25–15			75–54	P2
14 Jun	17:30	Russia	3–2	Japan	19–25	25–14	25–16	23–25	15–10	107–90	P2
14 Jun	20:30	Poland	1–3	Dominican Republic	18–25	25–16	21–25	20–25		84–91	P2

==== Pool 19 ====
- All times are Central European Summer Time (UTC+02:00).

Date	Time		Score		Set 1	Set 2	Set 3	Set 4	Set 5	Total	Report
12 Jun	17:00	Brazil	3–1	Belgium	25–15	25–14	21–25	25–23		96–77	P2
12 Jun	20:00	Italy	3–0	Thailand	25–11	25–17	25–15			75–43	P2
13 Jun	17:00	Brazil	3–1	Thailand	25–16	25–22	18–25	25–13		93–76	P2
13 Jun	20:00	Italy	3–0	Belgium	25–22	25–18	25–19			75–59	P2
14 Jun	17:00	Belgium	3–1	Thailand	26–24	23–25	25–20	25–21		99–90	P2
14 Jun	20:00	Italy	3–2	Brazil	22–25	25–20	17–25	25–19	15–12	104–101	P2

==== Pool 20 ====
- All times are Argentina Standard Time (UTC-03:00).

Date	Time		Score		Set 1	Set 2	Set 3	Set 4	Set 5	Total	Report
12 Jun	17:40	Serbia	3–1	United States	30–28	23–25	25–20	25–18		103–91	P2
12 Jun	20:40	Argentina	3–0	South Korea	25–18	26–24	25–21			76–63	P2
13 Jun	17:40	South Korea	0–3	United States	13–25	23–25	19–25			55–75	P2
13 Jun	20:40	Argentina	0–3	Serbia	27–29	13–25	16–25			56–79	P2
14 Jun	17:40	South Korea	0–3	Serbia	17–25	20–25	11–25			48–75	P2
14 Jun	20:40	Argentina	0–3	United States	15–25	14–25	15–25			44–75	P2

== Final round ==
- Venue: Nanjing Olympic Sports Center Gymnasium, Nanjing, China
- All times are China Standard Time (UTC+08:00).

=== Pool play ===
==== Pool A ====
Pos	Team	Pld	W	L	Pts	SW	SL	SR	SPW	SPL	SPR	Qualification
1	Brazil	2	2	0	6	6	0	MAX	150	120	1.250	Final four
2	China	2	1	1	3	3	4	0.750	159	161	0.988	Final four
3	Netherlands	2	0	2	0	1	6	0.167	142	170	0.835	

Date	Time		Score		Set 1	Set 2	Set 3	Set 4	Set 5	Total	Report
27 Jun	19:15	China	3–1	Netherlands	20–25	25–21	25–22	25–18		95–86	P2
28 Jun	19:15	Brazil	3–0	Netherlands	25–16	25–17	25–23			75–56	P2
29 Jun	20:30	China	0–3	Brazil	20–25	22–25	22–25			64–75	P2

==== Pool B ====
Pos	Team	Pld	W	L	Pts	SW	SL	SR	SPW	SPL	SPR	Qualification
1	United States	2	2	0	5	6	2	3.000	182	165	1.103	Final four
2	Turkey	2	1	1	3	5	5	1.000	202	206	0.981	Final four
3	Serbia	2	0	2	1	2	6	0.333	171	184	0.929	

Date	Time		Score		Set 1	Set 2	Set 3	Set 4	Set 5	Total	Report
27 Jun	15:00	United States	3–2	Turkey	17–25	21–25	25–21	25–15	15–11	103–97	P2
28 Jun	15:00	Serbia	2–3	Turkey	25–20	21–25	18–25	25–19	14–16	103–105	P2
29 Jun	15:00	United States	3–0	Serbia	29–27	25–22	25–19			79–68	P2

=== Final four ===
Semifinals
30 June
Brazil	0
Turkey	3
30 June
China	1
United States	3

final
1 July
Turkey	2
United States	3
3rd place match
1 July
China	3
Brazil	0

==== Semi-finals ====
Date	Time		Score		Set 1	Set 2	Set 3	Set 4	Set 5	Total	Report
30 Jun	15:00	Brazil	0–3	Turkey	23–25	23–25	22–25			68–75	P2
30 Jun	19:45	China	1–3	United States	23–25	20–25	25–18	18–25		86–93	P2

==== Third place match ====
Date	Time		Score		Set 1	Set 2	Set 3	Set 4	Set 5	Total	Report
1 Jul	15:00	China	3–0	Brazil	25–18	25–22	25–22			75–62	P2

==== Final ====
Date	Time		Score		Set 1	Set 2	Set 3	Set 4	Set 5	Total	Report
1 Jul	19:00	Turkey	2–3	United States	25–17	22–25	28–26	15–25	7–15	97–108	P2

== Final standing ==
Rank	Team
1st place, gold medalist(s)	United States
2nd place, silver medalist(s)	Turkey
3rd place, bronze medalist(s)	China
4	Brazil
5	Netherlands
5	Serbia
7	Italy
8	Russia
9	Poland
10	Japan
11	Germany
12	South Korea
13	Belgium
14	Dominican Republic
15	Thailand
16	Argentina

Source: VNL 2018 final standings

2018 Women's VNL champions

United States
First title

14–woman Roster
Micha Hancock, Carli Lloyd, Justine Wong-Orantes, Rachael Adams, TeTori Dixon, Lauren Gibbemeyer, Madison Kingdon, Jordan Larson (c), Andrea Drews, Kelly Murphy, Michelle Bartsch-Hackley, Kim Hill, Foluke Akinradewo, Kelsey Robinson
Head coach
Karch Kiraly

== Awards ==
- Most valuable player
  Michelle Bartsch-Hackley (USA)
- Best setter
  Cansu Özbay (TUR)
- Best Outside Hitters
  Michelle Bartsch-Hackley (USA)
  Zhu Ting (CHN)
- Best Middle Blockers
  TeTori Dixon (USA)
  Eda Erdem Dündar (TUR)
- Best Opposite
  Tandara Caixeta (BRA)
- Best libero
  Suelen Pinto (BRA)

== Statistics leaders ==
=== Preliminary round ===
as of June 14, 2018

Best Scorers
	Player	Spikes	Blocks	Serves	Total
1	(Poland) Malwina Smarzek	306	42	13	361
2	(Dominican Republic) Brayelin Martínez	223	19	8	250
3	(Serbia) Tijana Bošković	206	24	8	238
4	(Brazil) Tandara Caixeta	207	12	12	231
5	(Germany) Louisa Lippmann	204	11	9	224

Best Attackers
	Player	Spikes	Faults	Shots	Total	%
1	(Serbia) Tijana Bošković	206	80	132	418	49.28
2	(United States) Michelle Bartsch-Hackley	165	32	147	344	47.97
3	(Russia) Irina Voronkova	177	67	153	397	44.58
4	(Poland) Malwina Smarzek	306	93	296	695	44.03
5	(Brazil) Tandara Caixeta	207	65	201	473	43.76

Best Blockers
	Player	Blocks	Faults	Rebounds	Total	Avg
1	(Poland) Agnieszka Kąkolewska	52	85	123	260	0.90
2	(Brazil) Adenízia da Silva	48	61	62	171	0.80
3	(Brazil) Ana Beatriz Corrêa	45	74	93	212	0.75
4	(Turkey) Eda Erdem Dündar	44	61	123	228	0.75
5	(Poland) Malwina Smarzek	42	44	54	140	0.72

Best Servers
	Player	Aces	Faults	Hits	Total	Avg
1	(Poland) Marlena Pleśnierowicz	24	24	226	274	0.41
2	(Belgium) Marlies Janssens	21	31	104	156	0.39
3	(Turkey) Eda Erdem Dündar	22	22	142	186	0.37
4	(Italy) Elena Pietrini	19	31	44	94	0.34
5	(Thailand) Hattaya Bamrungsuk	18	19	139	176	0.31

Best Setters
	Player	Running	Faults	Still	Total	Avg
1	(Belgium) Ilka Van de Vyver	924	18	507	1449	17.11
2	(United States) Carli Lloyd	845	7	320	1172	16.90
3	(Brazil) Roberta Ratzke	883	9	405	1297	14.72
4	(Dominican Republic) Niverka Marte	776	13	501	1290	14.37
5	(Germany) Denise Hanke	751	9	537	1279	12.95

Best Diggers
	Player	Digs	Faults	Receptions	Total	Avg
1	(Netherlands) Maret Balkestein-Grothues	122	6	68	196	2.14
2	(Brazil) Suelen Pinto	115	13	151	279	1.92
3	(Belgium) Celine Van Gestel	102	14	125	241	1.89
4	(Turkey) Simge Şebnem Aköz	111	5	108	224	1.88
5	(United States) Kelsey Robinson	94	10	94	198	1.88

Best Receivers
	Player	Excellents	Faults	Serve	Total	%
1	(United States) Kim Hill	61	9	163	233	22.32
2	(Belgium) Britt Herbots	75	14	216	305	20.00
3	(United States) Kelsey Robinson	63	16	160	239	19.67
4	(Belgium) Celine Van Gestel	82	22	228	332	18.07
5	(Japan) Yuki Ishii	93	27	295	415	15.90

=== Final round ===
as of July 1, 2018

Best Scorers
	Player	Spikes	Blocks	Serves	Total
1	(China) Zhu Ting	77	6	3	86
2	(United States) Michelle Bartsch-Hackley	69	6	3	78
3	(Brazil) Tandara Caixeta	65	2	4	71
4	(Turkey) Eda Erdem Dündar	41	12	6	59
5	(Serbia) Tijana Bošković	54	3	1	58

Best Attackers
	Player	Spikes	Faults	Shots	Total	%
1	(Brazil) Gabriela Guimarães	50	20	34	104	48.08
2	(Brazil) Tandara Caixeta	65	20	56	141	46.10
3	(China) Zhu Ting	77	16	76	169	45.56
4	(Netherlands) Lonneke Slöetjes	35	12	33	80	43.75
5	(Serbia) Tijana Bošković	54	29	45	128	42.19

Best Blockers
	Player	Blocks	Faults	Rebounds	Total	Avg
1	(Brazil) Adenízia da Silva	13	21	12	46	1.08
2	(Brazil) Ana Beatriz Corrêa	9	14	21	44	0.75
3	(Turkey) Zehra Güneş	13	23	37	73	0.72
4	(Turkey) Eda Erdem Dündar	12	26	31	69	0.67
5	(United States) TeTori Dixon	11	13	23	47	0.65

Best Servers
	Player	Aces	Faults	Hits	Total	Avg
1	(United States) Jordan Larson	8	5	53	66	0.47
2	(Serbia) Milena Rašić	3	2	28	33	0.38
3	(Brazil) Roberta Ratzke	4	4	42	50	0.33
4	(Brazil) Tandara Caixeta	4	4	42	50	0.33
5	(Turkey) Eda Erdem Dündar	6	7	51	64	0.33

Best Setters
	Player	Running	Faults	Still	Total	Avg
1	(Brazil) Roberta Ratzke	297	4	4	305	24.75
2	(Turkey) Cansu Özbay	418	4	7	429	23.22
3	(Serbia) Bojana Živković	166	1	6	173	20.75
4	(United States) Carli Lloyd	336	2	5	343	19.76
5	(China) Ding Xia	276	1	2	279	19.71

Best Diggers
	Player	Digs	Faults	Receptions	Total	Avg
1	(China) Zhu Ting	37	0	20	57	2.64
2	(Netherlands) Anne Buijs	18	0	10	28	2.57
3	(Brazil) Suelen Pinto	30	0	14	44	2.50
4	(United States) Kelsey Robinson	42	0	36	78	2.47
5	(Serbia) Tijana Bošković	18	0	14	32	2.25

Best Receivers
	Player	Excellents	Faults	Serve	Total	%
1	(Brazil) Gabriela Guimarães	25	0	42	67	37.31
2	(United States) Kelsey Robinson	35	9	63	107	24.30
3	(Turkey) Simge Şebnem Aköz	28	7	52	87	24.14
4	(China) Liu Xiaotong	18	3	42	63	23.81
5	(United States) Michelle Bartsch-Hackley	30	7	68	105	21.90

== See also ==
- 2018 FIVB Volleyball Women's Challenger Cup
