= Malwina Smarzek =

Polish volleyball player (born 1996)

- Smarzek in 2026

Personal information
- Full name: Malwina Smarzek
- Nationality: Polish
- Born: 3 June 1996 (age 30) Łask, Poland
- Height: 191 cm (6 ft 3 in)
- Weight: 80 kg (176 lb)
- Spike: 318 cm (125 in)
- Block: 292 cm (115 in)

Volleyball information
- Position: Opposite spiker
- Current club: AGIL Novara
- Number: 17 (national team)

Career
- Years: Team
- 2014-2016: Legionovia SA
- 2017-2018: KPS Chemik Police
- 2018-2020: Zanetti Bergamo
- 2020-: AGIL Novara

National team
- Years: Team
- 2014: Poland
Honours
Women's Volleyball
Representing Poland
FIVB Nations League
Bronze medal – third place	2024 Bangkok	Team
Bronze medal – third place	2025 Łódź	Team
Montreux Volley Masters
Gold medal – first place	2019 Montreux	Team

Malwina Smarzek (born 3 June 1996) is a Polish volleyball player. She is a part of the Poland women's national volleyball team.

She participated in the 2014 FIVB Volleyball World Grand Prix. On club level she played for Legionovia SA in 2014.

== Awards ==
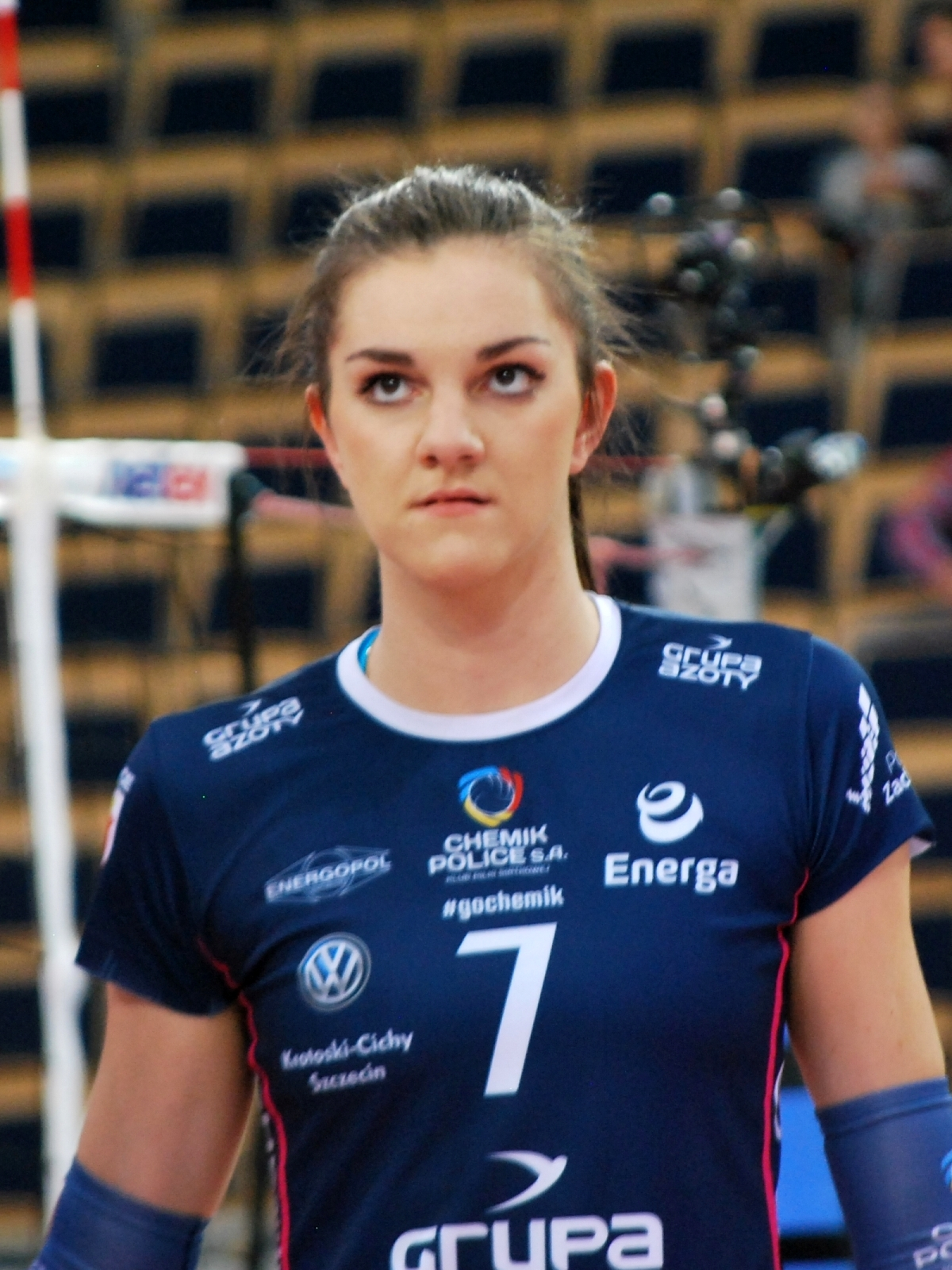
Smarzek with KPS Chemik Police in 2018

=== Clubs ===
- 2016-17 Polish Volleyball League – Champion, with KPS Chemik Police
- 2017-18 Polish Volleyball League – Champion, with KPS Chemik Police

=== Individual ===
- 2019 Montreux Volley Masters "Most valuable player"
- 2019 Montreux Volley Masters "Best opposite spiker"
