= FIVB Women's Volleyball Nations League =

International women's volleyball competition for national teams

- Most recent season or competition: 2026 FIVB Women's Volleyball Nations League
- VNL logo
- Sport: Volleyball
- Founded: 2017; 9 years ago
- First season: 2018
- CEO: Ary Graça
- No. of teams: 18
- Continent: International (FIVB)
- Most recent champions: Turkey (2nd title)
- Most titles: Italy; United States (3 titles each)
- Streaming partner: Volleyball TV
- Relegation to: Challenger Cup (2018–2024)
- Website: Volleyball Nations League

The FIVB Women's Volleyball Nations League is an international volleyball competition contested by the senior women's national teams of the members of the Fédération Internationale de Volleyball (FIVB), the sport's global governing body. The first tournament took place between May and July 2018, with the final round matches taking place in Nanjing, China. United States won the inaugural edition, defeating Turkey in the final.

In July 2018, the FIVB announced that China would host the next three editions of the women's Volleyball Nations League Finals, from 2019–2021‌, but on March 13, 2020, the Federation decided to postpone the Nations League until after the 2020 Summer Olympics due to the COVID-19 pandemic. Finally, the FIVB canceled the 2020 edition and confirmed Italy as the host of the final stage of the 2021 VNL.

In February 2024, the FIVB announced that the competition will be expanded to 18 teams from the 2025 edition onwards, and that along with this format reform will be the abolition of the core and challenge teams' statuses.

The creation of the tournament was announced in October 2017 (alongside the announcement of the Challenger Cup) as a joint project of the FIVB, the IMG and 21 national federations. The Women's VNL replaced the World Grand Prix, a former annual women's international event that ran between 1993 and 2017.

A corresponding tournament for men's national teams is the FIVB Men's Volleyball Nations League.

== History ==
=== Adoption ===
In June 2017, Argentinian website Voley Plus reported that the FIVB would drastically change the format for both the 2018 World League and World Grand Prix. According to the reports, starting from 2018, the World League and the World Grand Prix would have only one Group (no more Groups 1, 2 and 3) of 16 national teams.

In October 2017, the FIVB announced, via a press release, the creation of the men's and women's Volleyball Nations League, confirming the tournaments as a replacement for the World League and World Grand Prix.

== Marketing ==
The International Volleyball Federation has partnered with global brand strategy and design firm Landor Associates to create the Volleyball Nations League branding. Landor has also contributed with in-stadium and on-screen television graphics, staff uniforms, designs for the World Volleyball app, medals and the winning trophy.

=== Digital ===
Microsoft, the multinational technology company, has signed an agreement with the FIVB that the international federation vows will change the way the sport of volleyball is consumed while heightening the fan experience during match days as well as in the digital space. Under the tie-up, the 'Microsoft Sports Digital Platform' has been created to create new digital services and deliver personalised content on demand in order to boost the FIVB global audience and improve fan engagement.

== Prize money ==
According to the FIVB, the prize money is equal for both the men's and women's VNL as per the FIVB's gender equality policy.

=== Team awards ===
At the preliminary round, the winning team is awarded US$9,500 for every win and the losing team is awarded US$4,250.

Prize money allocated to teams based on their final place in the final round:

- Champions: US$1,000,000
- Runners-up: US$500,000
- 3rd place: US$300,000
- 4th place: US$180,000
- 5th place: US$130,000
- 6th place: US$85,000
- 7th place: US$65,000
- 8th place: US$40,000

Fair Play Award: Admissions by athletes before the Challenge is thrown will be evaluated to avoid time wasting, a green card will be awarded in this case. The team with the most green cards will receive a cash prize of $30,000. In case of a tie, the best-ranked team will be awarded.

=== Individual awards ===
The players selected into Dream Team will receive US$10,000 each while the MVP will be given US$30,000.

== Market performance ==
The FIVB announced that the 2019 Volleyball Nations League (both men's and women's) attracted a cumulative global audience of more than 1.5 billion. This number was an increase of 200 million from the 2018 VNL. In total, more than 600,000 tickets were sold in the 2019 VNL.

== Format ==
=== First format ===
As in the former World Grand Prix, the competition will be divided in two phases, albeit with changes in the competition formula: a preliminary round (known as preliminary round), with a system of rotating host cities, and a final round played in a pre-selected host city.

The preliminary round was held over five weeks, versus three in the World Grand Prix. Each week, the participating teams are organized in pools, and each team plays one match against all other teams in its pool. All games in a pool take place over a weekend in the same city.

When all matches of the preliminary round have been played, the top five teams in the overall standings qualify for the final round, and the remaining ones leave the competition. The host nation automatically qualifies for the final round.

16 national teams will compete in the inaugural edition of the tournament; 12 core teams, which are always qualified, and 4 challenger teams, which can face relegation.

- Preliminary round

The 16 teams compete in round-robin tournament, with every core team hosting a pool al least once. The teams are divided into 4 pools of 4 teams in each week and compete five weeks long, with a total of 120 matches. The top five teams after the round-robin tournament join the hosts in the final round. The relegation will consider the four challenger teams and the last ranked challenger team will be excluded from next edition. The winners of the Challenger Cup would qualify for next edition as a challenger team.

- Final round

The six qualified teams play in 2 pools of 3 teams in a round-robin format. The top 2 teams of each pool qualify for the semifinals. The first ranked teams play against the second ranked teams in this round. The winners of the semifinals advance to compete for the Nations League title.

=== Current format ===
The current format is applied since the 2022 edition. The whole competition still be divided into two phases: The pool phase and the Finals.

- Pool phase

The 16 teams will be divided into 2 groups of eight. Each team will play with 12 matches during the three weeks of the preliminary round. Two pools of eight teams will compete in four matches of six days of competition (Tuesday – Sunday). The new competition format allows for a one-week gap between events. The total number of matches in the pool phase will be 96.

- The finals

The Finals will see the eight strongest teams moving directly to the knockout phase which will consist of eight matches in total: four quarterfinals, two semi-finals and the bronze and gold medal matches. The total number of matches in the final phase will be 8.

=== Third reform from 2025 ===
The VNL will expand to 18 teams from 2025 alongside format changes that will elevate the VNL experience for athletes, fans, and all stakeholders. To facilitate the reform, there will be no relegation for the 2024 participating teams, while the winner of the 2024 Volleyball Challenger Cup, plus the top ranked not-yet-qualified team as per the senior Volleyball World Ranking, will join the participating teams of the 2025 VNL.

As of the 2025 edition, the core team status shall be abolished with the last team in the competition's final standing relegated, and the top team not yet qualified as per the Senior Volleyball World Ranking promoted into the following edition of the VNL.

== Challenger Cup ==
Until the 2024 edition, the FIVB Volleyball Challenger Cup is a competition for national teams which will run in concurrence with the Volleyball Nations League. The Challenger Cup consist of the best non-participating in the current edition of the Volleyball Nations League and featured feature one host team and five to seven teams from the five continental confederations as follows:

Confederation	Slots
AVC (Asia)	1
CAVB (Africa)	1
CSV (South America)	1
CEV (Europe)	2
NORCECA (North America)	1
Total	8(6+H+VNL)

The Continental Confederations, responsible for determining the teams that will qualify for the FIVB Challenger Cup, are free to organise their Continental Qualification Tournament or use an existing competition to define the qualified team(s).

The FIVB Challenger Cup is held before the FIVB Volleyball Nations League Finals (in 2018 and 2019 editions) but changed it in 2022 edition and the winners will qualify for the next year's VNL as a challenger team.

=== New VNL qualification system ===
Starting in 2025 edition, the lowest ranked Challenger team of the current edition of the VNL will be relegated. The best team in the World Ranking as of the end of the VNL edition and that did not participate in the VNL will be promoted to the next edition. For the avoidance of doubt, the relegated team will not qualify as the promoted team.

== Hosts ==
List of hosts by number of final round championships hosted.

Times hosted	Hosts	Year(s)
2	China	2018, 2019
1	Italy	2021
1	Turkey	2022
1	United States	2023
1	Thailand	2024
1	Poland	2025
1	Macau	2026

== Appearance ==
Team	League Round			Final Round		
Team	App.	First	Last	App.	First	Last
Argentina	1	2018	2018	–	–	–
Belgium	6	2018	2026	–	–	–
Brazil	8	2018	2026	8	2018	2026
Bulgaria	6	2019	2026	–	–	–
Canada	6	2021	2026	1	2026	2026
China	8	2018	2026	7	2018	2026
Croatia	1	2023	2023	–	–	–
Czech Republic	2	2025	2026	–	–	–
Dominican Republic	8	2018	2026	–	–	–
France	3	2024	2026	–	–	–
Germany	8	2018	2026	2	2023	2025
Italy	8	2018	2026	6	2019	2026
Japan	8	2018	2026	6	2021	2026
Netherlands	8	2018	2026	2	2018	2026
Poland	8	2018	2026	4	2019	2025
Russia	3	2018	2021	–	–	–
Serbia	8	2018	2026	2	2018	2022
South Korea	7	2018	2025	–	–	–
Thailand	8	2018	2026	2	2022	2024
Turkey	8	2018	2026	8	2018	2026
Ukraine	1	2026	2026	–	–	–
United States	8	2018	2026	8	2018	2026
Table current through the end of the 2026 edition.

== Results summary ==
Year	Final host	Final			3rd place match			Teams PR / FR
Year	Final host	Champions	Score	Runners-up	3rd place	Score	4th place	Teams PR / FR
2018; Details	(China); Nanjing	United States	3–2	Turkey	China	3–0	Brazil	16 / 6
2019; Details	(China); Nanjing	United States	3–2	Brazil	China	3–1	Turkey	16 / 6
2020	(China); Nanjing	Canceled due to COVID-19 pandemic						
2021; Details	(Italy); Rimini	United States	3–1	Brazil	Turkey	3–0	Japan	16 / 4
2022; Details	(Turkey); Ankara	Italy	3–0	Brazil	Serbia	3–0	Turkey	16 / 8
2023; Details	(United States); Arlington	Turkey	3–1	China	Poland	3–2	United States	16 / 8
2024; Details	(Thailand); Bangkok	Italy	3–1	Japan	Poland	3–2	Brazil	16 / 8
2025; Details	(Poland); Łódź	Italy	3–1	Brazil	Poland	3–1	Japan	18 / 8
2026; Details	Macau	Turkey	3–1	Brazil	Italy	3–1	China	18 / 8

== Medals summary ==
Rank	Nation	Gold	Silver	Bronze	Total
1	Italy	3	0	1	4
2	United States	3	0	0	3
3	Turkey	2	1	1	4
4	Brazil	0	5	0	5
5	China	0	1	2	3
6	Japan	0	1	0	1
7	Poland	0	0	3	3
8	Serbia	0	0	1	1
Totals (8 entries)		8	8	8	24

== MVP by edition ==
- 2018 – (United States) Michelle Bartsch-Hackley
- 2019 – (United States) Andrea Drews
- 2021 – (United States) Michelle Bartsch-Hackley (2)
- 2022 – (Italy) Paola Egonu
- 2023 – (Turkey) Melissa Vargas
- 2024 – (Italy) Paola Egonu (2)
- 2025 – (Italy) Monica De Gennaro
- 2026 – (Turkey) Melissa Vargas (2)

== Team performances by season ==
Legend

- 1st – Champions
- 2nd – Runners-up
- 3rd – Third place
- 4th – Fourth place
- – No movement for challenger teams
- ▲ – Promoted to the next year's VNL
- ▼ – Relegated for the challenger teams (2018–2024)/Relegated from the VNL (2025–present)

Team	2018 (16)			2019 (16)			2021 (16)			2022 (16)			2023 (16)			2024 (16)			2025 (18)		2026 (18)	
Team	G	FR	RK	G	FR	RK	G	FR	RK	G	FR	RK	G	FR	RK	G	FR	RK	FR	RK	FR	RK
Argentina	CH ▼	P	16	VCC			VCC (canceled)			did not participate						VCC			did not participate			
Belgium	CH	P	13	CH	P	7	CH	P	9	CH ▼	P	15	did not participate			VCC			P	14	P	13
Brazil	C	F	4	C	F	2	C	F	2	C	F	2	C	F	5	C	F	4	F	2	F	2
Bulgaria	VCC ▲			CH ▼	P	16	VCC (canceled)			CH	P	14	CH	P	13	CH	P	16	F	13	P	18 ▼
Canada	did not participate			VCC ▲			CH	P	14	CH	P	12	CH	P	10	CH	P	10	P	16	F	6
China	C	F	3	C	F	3	C	P	5	C	F	6	C	F	2	C	F	5	F	5	F	4
Croatia	did not participate			VCC			VCC (canceled)			VCC ▲			CH ▼	P	15	did not participate						
Czech Republic	did not participate			VCC			VCC (canceled)			VCC			did not participate			VCC ▲			P	11	P	10
Dominican Republic	CH	P	14	CH	P	8	CH	P	6	CH	P	9	CH	P	11	CH	P	11	P	12	P	15
France	did not participate						VCC (canceled)			VCC			VCC ▲			CH	P	14	P	9	P	17
Germany	C	P	11	C	P	10	C	P	10	C	P	10	C	F	8	C	P	13	F	7	P	12
Italy	C	P	7	C	F	5	C	P	12	C	F	1	C	F	6	C	F	1	F	1	F	3
Japan	C	P	10	C	P	9	C	F	4	C	F	7	C	F	7	C	F	2	F	4	F	7
Netherlands	C	F	5	C	P	11	C	P	7	C	P	11	C	P	12	C	P	9	P	10	F	8
Poland	CH	P	9	CH	F	5	CH	P	11	CH	P	13	CH	F	3	CH	F	3	F	3	P	9
Russia	C	P	8	C	P	14	C	P	8	Excluded (Note: Russian athletes were banned from competing following the 2022 Russian invasion of Ukraine.)												
Serbia	C	F	5	C	P	13	C	P	13	C	F	3	C	P	9	C	P	12	P	15	P	11
South Korea	C	P	12	C	P	15	C	P	15	C	P	16	C	P	16	C	P	15	P	18 ▼	did not participate	
Thailand	C	P	15	C	P	12	C	P	16	C	F	8	C	P	14	C	F	8	P	17	P	14
Turkey	C	F	2	C	F	4	C	F	3	C	F	4	C	F	1	C	F	6	F	6	F	1
Ukraine	did not participate												VCC			did not participate					P	16
United States	C	F	1	C	F	1	C	F	1	C	F	5	C	F	4	C	F	7	F	8	F	5
Table current through the end of the 2026 edition.

== Debut of national teams ==
Year	Debutants	Total
2018	Argentina, Brazil, Belgium, China, Dominican Republic, Germany, Italy, Japan, Netherlands, Poland, Russia, Serbia, South Korea, Thailand, Turkey, United States	16
2019	Bulgaria	1
2021	Canada	1
2022	None	0
2023	Croatia	1
2024	France	1
2025	Czech Republic	1
2026	Ukraine	1
2027	Slovenia	1

== See also ==
- FIVB Men's Volleyball Nations League
- FIVB Volleyball World Grand Prix
- FIVB Women's Volleyball Challenger Cup
- List of indoor volleyball world medalists
