= Unione Sportiva Pro Victoria Pallavolo Monza =

Italian women's volleyball club

Vero Volley Milano
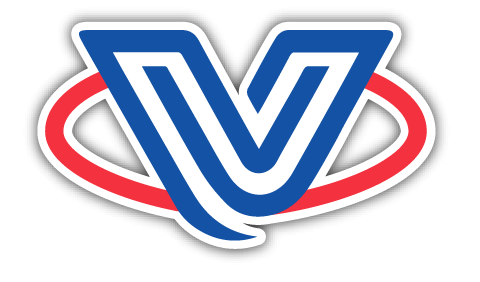
- Full name: Vero Volley Milano
- Founded: 1981
- Ground: Allianz Cloud Arena, Milan, Italy (Capacity: 5,420)
- Chairman: Carlo Rigaldo
- Head coach: Gianlorenzo Blengini
- League: FIPAV Women's Serie A1
- 2025–26: 2nd
- Website: Club home page

Uniforms
Home	Away

Unione Sportiva Pro Victoria Pallavolo, also known as Vero Volley Milano, is the professional volleyball department of Italian sports club U.S. Pro Victoria and is based in Monza. It has male and female teams and is better known for its women's team which currently plays in the Serie A1.

== Previous names ==
Due to sponsorship, the club have competed under the following names:

- Pro Victoria Pallavolo (1981–2008)
- Saugella Team Monza (2008–2021)
- Vero Volley Monza (2021–2022)
- Vero Volley Milano (2022–2023)
- Allianz Vero Volley Milano (2023–2024)
- Numia Vero Volley Milano (2024–present)

== History ==
=== Early years ===
Unione Sportiva Pro Victoria volleyball department was created in 1981 to provide the local community with a regular and organized sports activity. In few years the club becomes more professionally structured with the men's team playing in the regional league and the creation of a women's team. When the men's team reached the national Serie B, the club lack of economic resources to remain professional forced it to focus on the youth teams. In 2002 the club created a technical department providing better support for its teams.

=== Vero Volley ===
On 9 September 2008, Pro Victoria Pallavolo was one of the seven volleyball clubs from the Lombardy region which formed a consortium called Vero Volley based in Monza. The consortium was designed to provide supporting structure to its members through organisational strategies to offer the region physical activity and sport socialization, with focus on young people.

Pro Victoria teams grew and developed under the consortium, when the men's team gained promotion to Serie A2 in 2010, Pro Victoria sold its professional men's team assets and licence to Volley Milano, another member of the Vero Volley consortium. That allowed Pro Victoria to focus on the women's team and youth teams (men and women). In 2013 the women's team was promoted to Serie A2, eventually reaching the Serie A1 in 2016.

== Team ==
2026–2027 Team
Number	Player	Position	Height (m)	Birth date
2	(Puerto Rico) Valeria Vázquez Gomez	Outside Hitter	1.85	28 January 2001 (age 25)
4	(Italy) Francesca Bosio	Setter	1.80	7 August 1997 (age 29)
5	(Japan) Yoshino Sato	Outside Hitter	1.78	12 November 2001 (age 24)
7	(Italy) Virginia Di Napoli	Libero	1.64	25 July 2008 (age 18)
10	(Italy) Benedetta Sartori	Middle Blocker	1.87	14 April 2001 (age 25)
11	(Italy) Anna Danesi	Middle Blocker	1.96	20 April 1996 (age 30)
13	(Belarus) Aida Dautova	Middle Blocker	2.01	29 May 2008 (age 18)
14	(Serbia) Hena Kurtagić	Middle Blocker	1.95	27 August 2004 (age 22)
16	(United States) Khalia Lanier	Outside Hitter	1.86	19 September 1998 (age 28)
17	(Dominican Republic) Alondra Tapia (Note: Alondra Tapia joined the team on 6 October 2026.)	Opposite	1.93	19 May 2004 (age 22)
18	(Italy) Paola Egonu (c)	Opposite	1.93	18 December 1998 (age 27)
~~19~~	(Italy) ~~Binto Diop~~ (Note: Binto Diop left the team on 6 October 2026.)	~~Opposite~~	~~1.94~~	~~2 March 2002 (age 24)~~
23	(Italy) Giulia Gennari	Setter	1.84	23 June 1996 (age 30)
25	(Italy) Rebecca Piva	Outside Hitter	1.86	1 May 2001 (age 25)
80	(Italy) Eleonora Fersino	Libero	1.69	24 January 2000 (age 26)

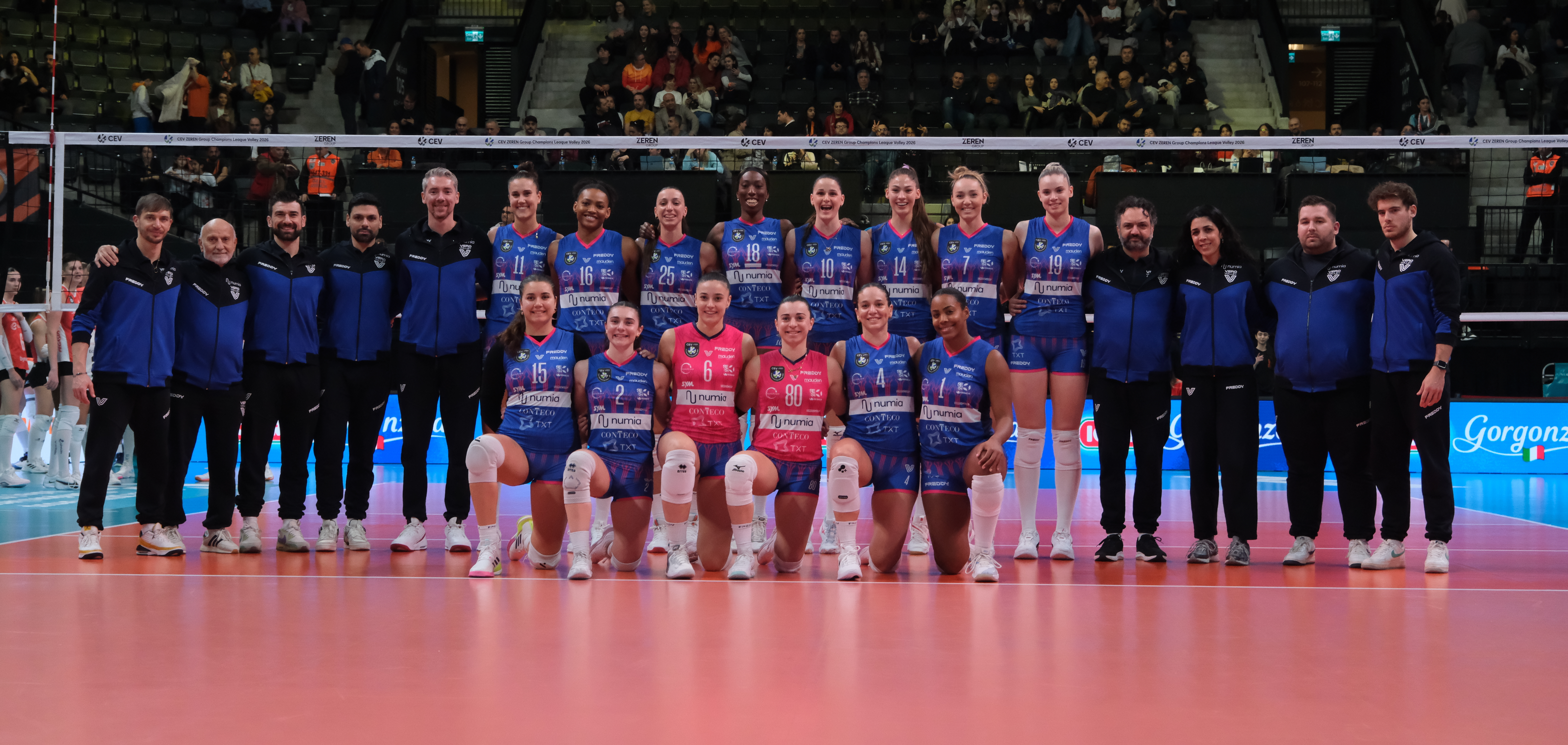
2025-26 team

2025–2026 Team
Number	Player	Position	Height (m)	Birth date
1	(United States) Kamerynn Miner	Setter	1.83	17 March 2003 (age 23)
2	(France) Juliette Gelin	Libero	1.62	2 November 2001 (age 24)
4	(Italy) Francesca Bosio	Setter	1.80	7 August 1997 (age 29)
6	(Italy) Nicole Modesti	Middle Blocker	1.88	16 March 2004 (age 22)
7	(Italy) Elena Pietrini	Outside Hitter	1.86	17 March 2000 (age 26)
~~9~~	(Netherlands) ~~Celeste Plak~~ (Note: Celeste Plak left the team on 1 December 2025.)	~~Opposite~~	~~1.90~~	~~26 October 1995 (age 30)~~
10	(Italy) Benedetta Sartori	Middle Blocker	1.87	14 April 2001 (age 25)
11	(Italy) Anna Danesi	Middle Blocker	1.96	20 April 1996 (age 30)
14	(Serbia) Hena Kurtagić	Middle Blocker	1.95	27 August 2004 (age 22)
15	(Italy) Emma Cagnin	Outside Hitter	1.86	26 June 2002 (age 24)
16	(United States) Khalia Lanier	Outside Hitter	1.86	19 September 1998 (age 28)
18	(Italy) Paola Egonu (c)	Opposite	1.93	18 December 1998 (age 27)
19	(Russia) Vita Akimova	Opposite	1.97	16 July 2002 (age 24)
25	(Italy) Rebecca Piva	Outside Hitter	1.86	1 May 2001 (age 25)
80	(Italy) Eleonora Fersino	Libero	1.69	24 January 2000 (age 26)

2024–2025 Team
Number	Player	Position	Height (m)	Birth date
1	(France) Héléna Cazaute	Outside Hitter	1.84	17 December 1997 (age 28)
2	(France) Juliette Gelin	Libero	1.62	2 November 2001 (age 24)
3	(Italy) Ludovica Guidi	Middle Blocker	1.85	17 December 1992 (age 33)
~~4~~	(Bulgaria) ~~Radostina Marinova~~ (Note: Radostina Marinova left the team on 30 December 2024.)	~~Opposite~~	~~1.86~~	~~2 October 1998 (age 28)~~
5	(Belgium) Laura Heyrman	Middle Blocker	1.88	17 May 1993 (age 33)
~~6~~	(Italy) ~~Anastasia Guerra~~ (Note: Anastasia Guerra left the team on 5 December 2024.)	~~Outside Hitter~~	~~1.86~~	~~15 October 1996 (age 29)~~
7	(Italy) Elena Pietrini	Outside Hitter	1.86	17 March 2000 (age 26)
8	(Italy) Alessia Orro (c)	Setter	1.80	18 July 1998 (age 28)
11	(Italy) Anna Danesi	Middle Blocker	1.96	20 April 1996 (age 30)
12	(Greece) Lamprini Konstantinídou	Setter	1.84	16 September 1996 (age 30)
13	(Japan) Satomi Fukudome	Libero	1.62	23 November 1997 (age 28)
14	(Serbia) Hena Kurtagić	Middle Blocker	1.95	27 August 2004 (age 22)
15	(Canada) Anna Smrek (Note: Anna Smrek joined the team on 3 January 2025.)	Opposite	2.07	11 October 2003 (age 22)
17	(Italy) Myriam Sylla	Outside Hitter	1.81	8 January 1995 (age 31)
18	(Italy) Paola Egonu	Opposite	1.93	18 December 1998 (age 27)
19	(Netherlands) Nika Daalderop	Outside Hitter	1.90	29 November 1998 (age 27)

2023–2024 Team
Number	Player	Position	Height (m)	Birth date
1	(France) Héléna Cazaute	Outside Hitter	1.84	17 December 1997 (age 28)
3	(Italy) Adhuoljok Malual	Opposite	1.90	14 November 2000 (age 25)
5	(Belgium) Laura Heyrman	Middle Blocker	1.88	17 May 1993 (age 33)
7	(Italy) Raphaela Folie	Middle Blocker	1.86	7 March 1991 (age 35)
8	(Italy) Alessia Orro (c)	Setter	1.80	18 July 1998 (age 28)
~~10~~	(Italy) ~~Beatrice Parrocchiale~~ (Note: Beatrice Parrocchiale left the team on 7 November 2023.)	~~Libero~~	~~1.67~~	~~26 December 1995 (age 30)~~
11	(Italy) Vittoria Prandi	Setter	1.80	4 November 1994 (age 31)
12	(Serbia) Teodora Pušić (Note: Teodora Pušić joined the team in November 2023.)	Libero	1.70	12 March 1993 (age 33)
14	(United States) Dana Rettke	Middle Blocker	2.03	21 January 1999 (age 27)
15	(United States) Kara Bajema	Outside Hitter	1.88	24 March 1998 (age 28)
17	(Italy) Myriam Sylla	Outside Hitter	1.81	8 January 1995 (age 31)
18	(Italy) Paola Egonu	Opposite	1.93	18 December 1998 (age 27)
19	(Netherlands) Nika Daalderop	Outside Hitter	1.90	29 November 1998 (age 27)
28	(Italy) Sonia Candi	Middle Blocker	1.87	8 November 1993 (age 32)
55	(Dominican Republic) Brenda Castillo	Libero	1.67	5 June 1992 (age 34)

2022–2023 Team
Number	Player	Position	Height (m)	Birth date
~~2~~	(Belgium) ~~Pauline Martin~~ (Note: Pauline Martin left the team on 13 March 2023.)	~~Opposite~~	~~1.85~~	~~4 September 2002 (age 24)~~
3	(Poland) Magdalena Stysiak	Outside Hitter	2.03	3 December 2000 (age 25)
6	(Canada) Averie Allard	Setter	1.84	21 April 1999 (age 27)
7	(Italy) Raphaela Folie	Middle Blocker	1.86	7 March 1991 (age 35)
8	(Italy) Alessia Orro (c)	Setter	1.80	18 July 1998 (age 28)
9	(Italy) Letizia Camera	Setter	1.75	1 October 1992 (age 34)
10	(Italy) Beatrice Parrocchiale	Libero	1.67	26 December 1995 (age 30)
11	(Bosnia and Herzegovina) Edina Begić	Outside Hitter	1.85	9 October 1992 (age 33)
12	(United States) Jordan Thompson	Opposite	1.93	5 May 1997 (age 29)
14	(United States) Dana Rettke	Middle Blocker	2.03	21 January 1999 (age 27)
15	(Serbia) Jovana Stevanović	Middle Blocker	1.91	30 June 1992 (age 34)
16	(Italy) Beatrice Negretti	Libero	1.70	16 November 1999 (age 26)
17	(Italy) Myriam Sylla	Outside Hitter	1.81	8 January 1995 (age 31)
18	(Italy) Anna Davyskiba	Outside Hitter	1.88	8 February 2000 (age 26)
23	(United States) Jordan Larson (Note: Jordan Larson joined the team in December 2022.)	Outside Hitter	1.87	16 October 1986 (age 39)
28	(Italy) Sonia Candi	Middle Blocker	1.87	8 November 1993 (age 32)

2021–2022 Team
Number	Player	Position	Height (m)	Birth date
2	(Serbia) Katarina Lazović	Outside Hitter	1.82	12 September 1999 (age 27)
3	(Poland) Magdalena Stysiak	Opposite	2.03	3 December 2000 (age 25)
5	(Italy) Jennifer Boldini	Setter	1.87	6 April 1999 (age 27)
6	(Italy) Alessia Gennari	Outside Hitter	1.84	3 November 1991 (age 34)
7	(Belgium) Lise Van Hecke	Opposite	1.92	1 July 1992 (age 34)
8	(Italy) Alessia Orro	Setter	1.80	18 July 1998 (age 28)
~~9~~	(Serbia) ~~Brankica Mihajlović~~ (Note: Brankica Mihajlović left the team on 27 January 2022.)	~~Outside Hitter~~	~~1.89~~	~~13 April 1991 (age 35)~~
10	(Italy) Beatrice Parrocchiale	Libero	1.67	26 December 1995 (age 30)
11	(Italy) Anna Danesi (c)	Middle Blocker	1.96	20 April 1996 (age 30)
14	(United States) Dana Rettke	Middle Blocker	2.03	21 January 1999 (age 27)
15	(United States) Jordan Larson	Outside Hitter	1.87	16 October 1986 (age 39)
16	(Cyprus) Katerina Zakchaiou	Middle Blocker	1.92	26 July 1998 (age 28)
18	(Italy) Anna Davyskiba	Outside Hitter	1.88	8 February 2000 (age 26)
28	(Italy) Sonia Candi	Middle Blocker	1.87	8 November 1993 (age 32)
45	(Italy) Gaia Moretto	Middle Blocker	1.92	18 September 1994 (age 32)
99	(Italy) Beatrice Negretti	Libero	1.70	16 November 1999 (age 26)

2020–2021 Team
Number	Player	Position	Height (m)	Birth date
3	(Italy) Giulia Carraro	Setter	1.75	25 July 1994 (age 32)
4	(Italy) Federica Squarcini	Middle Blocker	1.83	24 September 2000 (age 26)
5	(Belgium) Laura Heyrman (c)	Middle Blocker	1.88	17 May 1993 (age 33)
7	(Belgium) Lise Van Hecke	Opposite	1.92	1 July 1992 (age 34)
8	(Italy) Alessia Orro	Setter	1.80	18 July 1998 (age 28)
10	(Bosnia and Herzegovina) Edina Begić	Outside Hitter	1.85	9 October 1992 (age 33)
11	(Italy) Anna Danesi	Middle Blocker	1.96	20 April 1996 (age 30)
12	(Germany) Hanna Orthmann	Outside Hitter	1.88	3 October 1998 (age 28)
14	(Netherlands) Floortje Meijners	Outside Hitter	1.92	16 January 1987 (age 39)
16	(Italy) Josephine Obossa	Opposite	1.83	20 May 1999 (age 27)
18	(Italy) Anna Davyskiba	Outside Hitter	1.88	8 February 2000 (age 26)
20	(Italy) Beatrice Parrocchiale	Libero	1.67	26 December 1995 (age 30)
99	(Italy) Beatrice Negretti	Libero	1.70	16 November 1999 (age 26)

2019–2020 Team
Number	Player	Position	Height (m)	Birth date
1	(Italy) Serena Ortolani (c)	Opposite	1.87	7 January 1987 (age 39)
2	(Italy) Mariana Costa	Outside Hitter	1.81	30 July 1986 (age 40)
4	(Italy) Federica Squarcini	Middle Blocker	1.83	24 September 2000 (age 26)
5	(Belgium) Laura Heyrman	Middle Blocker	1.88	17 May 1993 (age 33)
7	(Italy) Isabella Di Iulio	Setter	1.75	26 November 1991 (age 34)
8	(Poland) Katarzyna Skorupa	Setter	1.84	16 September 1984 (age 42)
10	(Bosnia and Herzegovina) Edina Begić	Outside Hitter	1.85	9 October 1992 (age 33)
11	(Italy) Anna Danesi	Middle Blocker	1.96	20 April 1996 (age 30)
12	(Germany) Hanna Orthmann	Outside Hitter	1.88	3 October 1998 (age 28)
14	(Netherlands) Floortje Meijners	Outside Hitter	1.92	16 January 1987 (age 39)
16	(Italy) Josephine Obossa	Opposite	1.83	20 May 1999 (age 27)
17	(Italy) Ilaria Bonvicini	Libero	1.65	28 February 1997 (age 29)
20	(Italy) Beatrice Parrocchiale	Libero	1.67	26 December 1995 (age 30)
22	(United States) Kathryn Plummer (Note: Kathryn Plummer joined the team on 17 January 2020.)	Outside Hitter	2.01	16 October 1998 (age 27)

2018–2019 Team
Number	Player	Position	Height (m)	Birth date
1	(Italy) Serena Ortolani (c)	Opposite	1.87	7 January 1987 (age 39)
3	(Italy) Chiara Arcangeli	Libero	1.67	14 February 1983 (age 43)
~~4~~	(Italy) ~~Laura Partenio~~ (Note: Brankica Mihajlović left the team on 29 January 2019.)	~~Outside Hitter~~	~~1.83~~	~~29 December 1991 (age 34)~~
5	(Italy) Martina Balboni	Setter	1.80	29 January 1991 (age 35)
7	(Italy) Francesca Devetag	Middle Blocker	1.86	13 November 1986 (age 39)
8	(United States) Rachael Adams	Middle Blocker	1.90	3 June 1990 (age 36)
9	(United States) Micha Hancock	Setter	1.80	10 November 1992 (age 33)
10	(Bosnia and Herzegovina) Edina Begić	Outside Hitter	1.85	9 October 1992 (age 33)
11	(Netherlands) Anne Buijs	Outside Hitter	1.91	2 December 1991 (age 34)
12	(Germany) Hanna Orthmann	Outside Hitter	1.88	3 October 1998 (age 28)
13	(Italy) Fabiola Facchinetti	Middle Blocker	1.82	30 April 1989 (age 37)
14	(Italy) Marika Bianchini	Outside Hitter	1.78	23 April 1993 (age 33)
17	(Italy) Ilaria Bonvicini	Libero	1.65	28 February 1997 (age 29)
19	(Italy) Laura Melandri	Middle Blocker	1.86	31 January 1995 (age 31)

2017–2018 Team
Number	Player	Position	Height (m)	Birth date
1	(Italy) Serena Ortolani (c)	Opposite	1.87	7 January 1987 (age 39)
2	(Germany) Hanna Orthmann	Outside Hitter	1.88	3 October 1998 (age 28)
3	(Italy) Chiara Arcangeli	Libero	1.67	14 February 1983 (age 43)
5	(Italy) Martina Balboni	Setter	1.80	29 January 1991 (age 35)
6	(United States) Tori Dixon	Middle Blocker	1.91	4 August 1992 (age 34)
7	(Italy) Francesca Devetag	Middle Blocker	1.86	13 November 1986 (age 39)
8	(Italy) Sonia Candi	Middle Blocker	1.87	8 November 1993 (age 32)
10	(Bosnia and Herzegovina) Edina Begić	Outside Hitter	1.85	9 October 1992 (age 33)
11	(Italy) Ilaria Bonvicini	Libero	1.65	28 February 1997 (age 29)
12	(United States) Micha Hancock	Setter	1.80	10 November 1992 (age 33)
16	(Czech Republic) Helena Havelkova	Outside Hitter	1.88	25 July 1988 (age 38)
17	(Italy) Sara Loda	Outside Hitter	1.78	22 August 1990 (age 36)
18	(Italy) Rachele Rastelli	Opposite	1.92	22 June 1999 (age 27)

2016–2017 Team
Number	Player	Position	Height (m)	Birth date
~~1~~	(Russia) ~~Irina Smirnova~~ (Note: Irina Smirnova left the team on 24 January 2017.)	~~Opposite~~	~~1.90~~	~~10 April 1990 (age 36)~~
3	(Italy) Chiara Arcangeli	Libero	1.67	14 February 1983 (age 43)
5	(Italy) Martina Balboni	Setter	1.80	29 January 1991 (age 35)
6	(Poland) Berenika Tomsia	Opposite	1.89	18 March 1988 (age 38)
7	(Italy) Francesca Devetag	Middle blocker	1.86	13 November 1986 (age 39)
8	(Italy) Sonia Candi	Middle blocker	1.87	8 November 1993 (age 32)
9	(Belgium) Freya Aelbrecht	Middle blocker	1.89	10 February 1990 (age 36)
10	(Bosnia and Herzegovina) Edina Begić	Outside hitter	1.85	10 September 1992 (age 34)
11	(Italy) Silvia Lussana	Libero	1.69	30 October 1988 (age 37)
13	(Italy) Stefania Dall'Igna	Setter	1.75	22 November 1984 (age 41)
15	(Italy) Anna Nicoletti	Opposite	1.89	3 January 1996 (age 30)
16	(Spain) María Segura	Outside hitter	1.85	10 June 1992 (age 34)
17	(Serbia) Milica Bezarević	Outside hitter	1.82	27 December 1991 (age 34)
18	(United States) Haley Eckerman	Outside hitter	1.90	10 November 1992 (age 33)

== Head coaches ==
Period	Head coach
2012–2014	(Italy) Enrico Mazzola
2014–2017	(Italy) Davide Delmati
2017–2018	(Italy) Luciano Pedullà
2018–2019	(Spain) Miguel Ángel Falasca
2019–2020	(Italy) Massimo Dagioni
2020–2020	(Italy) Carlo Parisi
2020–2024	(Italy) Marco Gaspari
2024–2026	(Italy) Stefano Lavarini
2026–	(Italy) Gianlorenzo Blengini

== Honours ==
=== National competitions ===
- Italian Super Cup: 1

2025

=== International competitions ===
- CEV Cup: 1

2020–21

- CEV Challenge Cup: 1

2018–19
