= Nyeme Costa =

Brazilian volleyball player (born 1998)

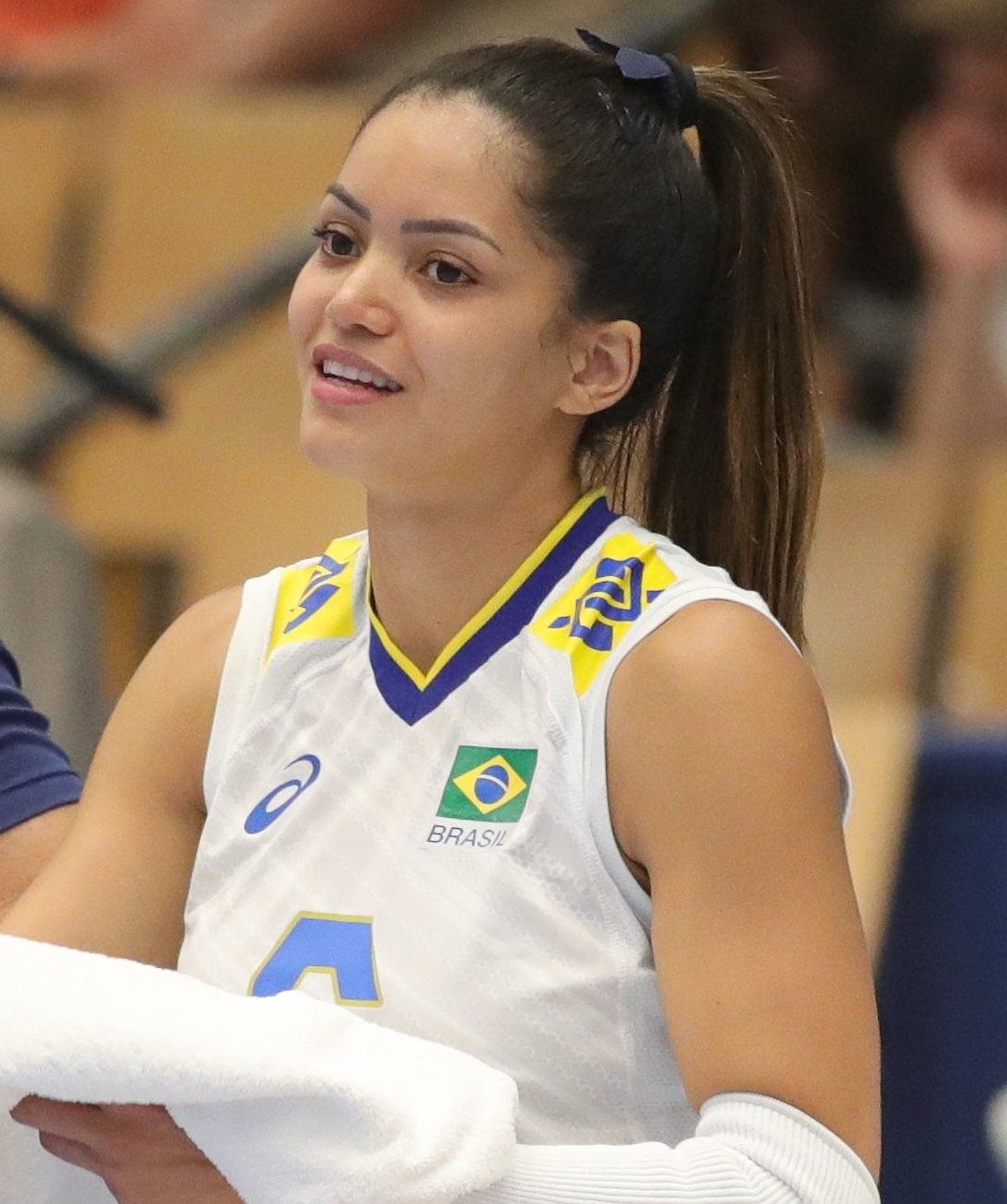
- Costa in 2022

Personal information
- Full name: Nyeme Victória Alexandre Costa Nunes
- Nationality: (Brazil) Brazilian
- Born: 11 October 1998 (age 28); Barra do Corda (Maranhão), Brazil
- Height: 175 cm (5 ft 9 in)
- Weight: 59 kg (130 lb)
- Spike: 297 cm (117 in)
- Block: 280 cm (110 in)

Volleyball information
- Position: Libero
- Current club: (Brazil) Minas
- Number: 6 (national team)

Career
Years	Teams
2013–2014	(Brazil) Maranhão Vôlei fr
2016–2019	(Brazil) ADC Bradesco pt
2019–2021	(Brazil) Barueri
2021–2022	(Brazil) Sesi Vôlei Bauru
2022–	(Brazil) Minas

National team
2019–	Brazil
Honours
Women's volleyball
Representing Brazil
Olympic Games
Bronze medal – third place	2024 Paris	Team
FIVB World Championship
Silver medal – second place	2022 Poland/Netherlands	Team
FIVB Nations League
Silver medal – second place	2021 Rimini	Team
Silver medal – second place	2022 Ankara	Team
Silver medal – second place	2026 Macau	Team
South American Championships
Gold medal – first place	2021 Barrancabermeja
Gold medal – first place	2023 Recife
Gold medal – first place	2026 Rio de Janeiro
U21 South American Championships
Gold medal – first place	2016 Uberaba

Nyeme Victória Alexandre Costa Nunes (born 11 October 1998) is a Brazilian volleyball player. She is a current member of the Brazil women's national volleyball team. She represented Brazil at the 2024 Summer Olympics.

Before playing volleyball, she competed in athletics, where she excelled in the high jump. Later, she was drawn to volleyball when she started playing it at school.

== Clubs ==
- (Brazil) Maranhão Vôlei (2013–2014)
- (Brazil) ADC Bradesco (2016–2019)
- (Brazil) Barueri (2019–2021)
- (Brazil) Sesi Vôlei Bauru (2021–2022)
- (Brazil) Minas (2022–)

== Awards and honors ==
=== Individual ===
- 2017 FIVB Volleyball Women's U20 World Championship – Best Libero
