= Paola Egonu =

Italian volleyball player (born 1998)

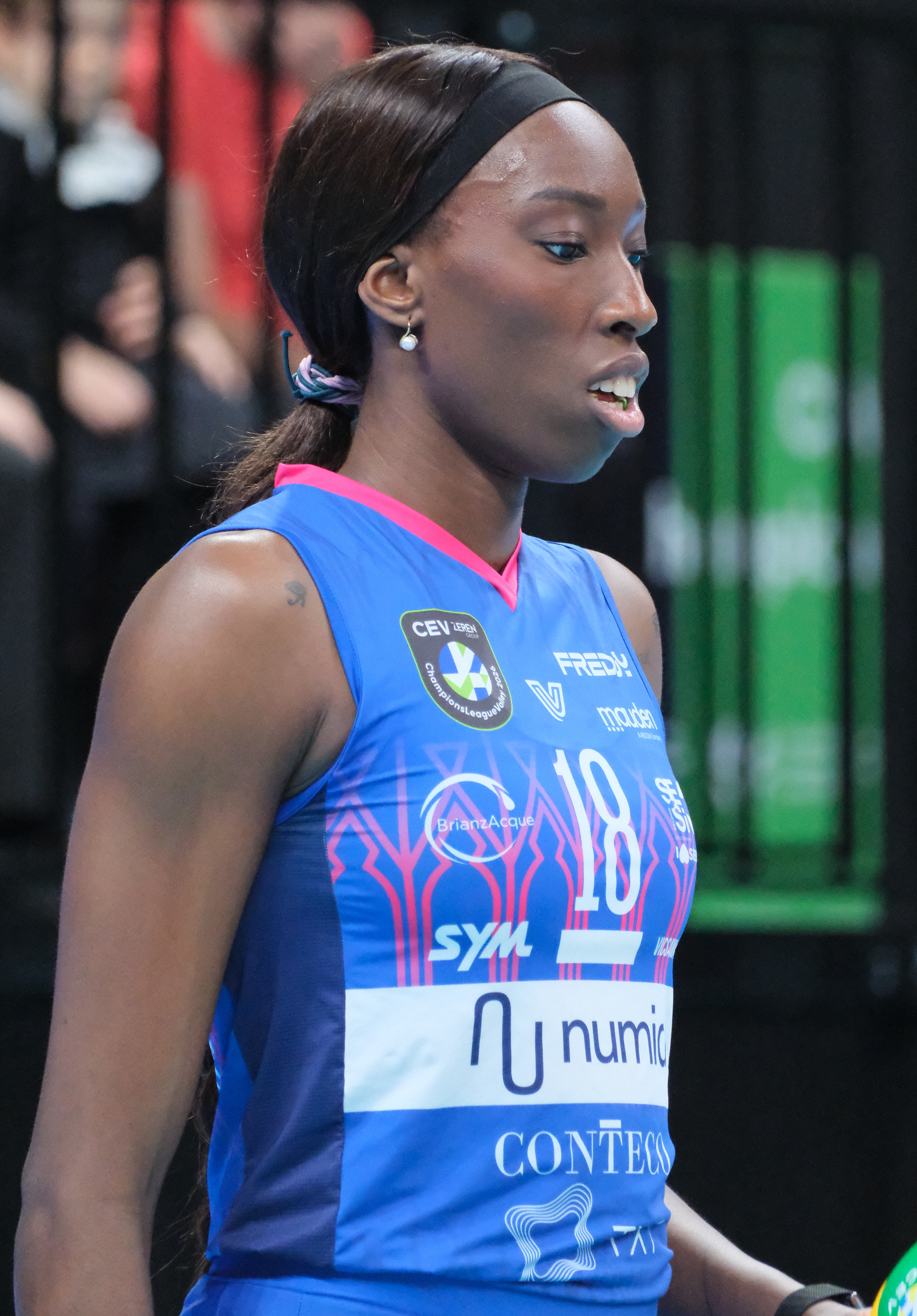
- Egonu as Vero Volley Milano captain in 2026

Personal information
- Full name: Paola Ogechi Egonu
- Nickname: The Queen of Volleyball
- Born: 18 December 1998 (age 27) Cittadella, Italy
- Height: 1.96 m (6 ft 5 in)
- Weight: 79 kg (174 lb)
- Spike: 3.44 m (135 in)
- Block: 3.21 m (126 in)

Volleyball information
- Position: Opposite
- Current club: (Italy) Vero Volley Milano

Career
- Years: Team
- 2013–2017: (Italy) Club Italia
- 2017–2019: (Italy) AGIL Novara
- 2019–2022: (Italy) Imoco Volley Conegliano
- 2022–2023: (Turkey) VakıfBank S.K.
- 2023–: (Italy) Vero Volley Milano

National team
- Years: Team
- 2015–: Italy
Honours
Women's volleyball
Representing Italy
Olympic Games
Gold medal – first place	2024 Paris	Team
FIVB World Championship
Gold medal – first place	2025 Thailand	Team
Silver medal – second place	2018 Japan	Team
Bronze medal – third place	2022 Poland/Netherlands	Team
FIVB Nations League
Gold medal – first place	2022 Ankara	Team
Gold medal – first place	2024 Bangkok	Team
Gold medal – first place	2025 Łódź	Team
Bronze medal – third place	2026 Macau	Team
FIVB World Grand Prix
Silver medal – second place	2017 Nanjing
European Championship
Gold medal – first place	2021 Serbia/Bulgaria/Croatia/Romania	Team
Bronze medal – third place	2019 Turkey	Team
Silver medal – second place	2026 Azerbaijan-Czechia-Sweden-Turkey	Team
Montreux Volley Masters
Gold medal – first place	2018 Switzerland	Team
FIVB Volleyball Girls' U18 World Championship
Gold medal – first place	2015 Peru	Team

Paola Ogechi Egonu (Italian: [ˈpaːola oˈɡɛːtʃi eˈɡɔːnu], Igbo; born 18 December 1998) is an Italian professional volleyball player. She plays as an opposite for both the Italian Women's National Team, and the Italian Club, Vero Volley Milano in the A1 division of the Lega Volley Femminile.

== Early and personal life ==
Egonu was born in Cittadella, Veneto, to Nigerian parents. She has two siblings, Angela and Andrea. Her cousin, Terry Enweonwu, also plays volleyball.

== Career ==
=== National team ===
After receiving Italian citizenship at the age of fourteen, Egonu made her Italian national team debut in 2015. That year, she was named MVP of the U18 World Championship after leading her team to gold. Later that year, she also led Italy to bronze at the U20 World Championship. Just one year later, at the age of 17, she was selected to the 12-person roster for the 2016 Summer Olympics, where Italy finished in 9th place.

In 2018, Egonu helped her team win silver at the 2018 World Championship in Japan. She finished the tournament with 324 points in 13 matches, averaging nearly 25 points per match. Additionally, Egonu set a new record for most points scored in a match, with 45 points scored in the semifinals versus China.

At the 2020 Summer Olympics, Egonu was a flag-bearer during the Opening Ceremony. Italy placed sixth after losing to Serbia in the quarterfinals.

In 2022, Egonu and the Italian national team earned Italy's first-ever medal at the Volleyball Nations League, where they won gold. Egonu was the leading scorer of the finals, amassing a total of 83 points over three matches. She was named Most Valuable Player and Best Opposite of the tournament.

Egonu took a break from playing with Italy's national team due to racism she experienced in Italy and on social media. She returned to playing with Italy in 2024 under new coach Julio Velasco. That year, Egonu led Italy to repeat its 2022 performance at the Volleyball Nations League, where she once again earned MVP. At the 2024 Summer Olympics in Paris, Italy won its first-ever gold medal, with Egonu being named MVP and Best Opposite.

In August 2024, a newly-unveiled mural of Egonu near to the Italian National Olympic Committee headquarters in Rome was defaced, with Egonu's skin repainted pink and an anti-racism message obscured. Deputy Prime Minister Antonio Tajani described the vandalism as a "serious gesture of vulgar racism", while Roberto Gualtieri, the Mayor of Rome, said it was "a vile insult to a great Italian, who has brought the colours of our country to the top of the world, and to an artist committed to fighting against xenophobia."

=== Professional clubs ===
At the club level, Egonu has primarily played in Italian clubs; she played for Club Italia in 2015, AGIL Novara from 2017 to 2019, and Imoco Volley Conegliano from 2019 to 2022. She spent the 2022–2023 season playing for Turkish club VakifBank before returning to Italy to play for Vero Volley Milano in 2023. With AGIL Novara, Egonu earned a CEV Champions League title, two Italian Cups, and one Super Cup. She won the Club World Championship with Imoco Volley in 2019 and the CEV Champions League in 2023 with Vakifbank.

As of 2024, Egonu holds women's volleyball records for highest jump, fastest serve, and fastest spike.

== Other ventures ==
In 2020, she dubbed the character Dreamerwind (Italian: Sognaluna Dibrezza), originally voiced by Cathy Cavadini, for the Italian version of the animation movie Soul, produced by Disney and Pixar.

She co-presented the Italian show Le Iene in its 2020–2021 season. She appeared as a co-presenter at the Sanremo Music Festival 2023 with festival host Amadeus and singer Gianni Morandi.

== Awards and honours ==
=== Clubs ===
- 2017 Italian Super Cup – Champion, with Igor Gorgonzola Novara
- 2017–18 Italian Cup (Coppa Italia) – Champion, with Igor Gorgonzola Novara
- 2018–19 Italian Cup (Coppa Italia) – Champion, with Igor Gorgonzola Novara
- 2018–19 CEV Champions League – Champion, with AGIL Novara
- 2019 Italian Super Cup – Champion, with Imoco Volley Conegliano
- 2019 FIVB Volleyball Women's Club World Championship – Champion, with Imoco Volley Conegliano
- 2019–20 Italian Cup (Coppa Italia) – Champion, with Imoco Volley Conegliano
- 2020 Italian Super Cup – Champions, with Imoco Volley Conegliano
- 2020–21 Italian Cup (Coppa Italia) – Champion, with Imoco Volley Conegliano
- 2020–21 Italian League – Champion, with Imoco Volley Conegliano
- 2020–21 CEV Champions League – Champion, with Imoco Volley Conegliano
- 2021 Italian Super Cup – Champions, with Imoco Volley Conegliano
- 2021–22 Italian Cup (Coppa Italia) – Champion, with Imoco Volley Conegliano
- 2021–22 Italian League – Champion, with Imoco Volley Conegliano
- 2022–23 Turkish Women's Volleyball Cup – Champion, with VakıfBank S.K.
- 2022–23 CEV Champions League – Champion, with Vakıfbank S.K.
- 2025 Italian Super Cup – Champion, with Vero Volley Milano

=== Individuals ===
- 2015 U18 World Championship – "Best outside hitter"
- 2015 U18 World Championship – "Most valuable player"
- 2016 Europe Olympic Qualification Tournament – "Best outside spiker"
- 2016–17 Italian League – "Top scorer"
- 2017–18 Italian Cup (Coppa Italia) – "Most valuable player"
- 2018 Montreux Volley Masters – "Most valuable player"
- 2018 FIVB World Championship – "Best opposite hitter"
- 2018–19 Italian League – "Top scorer"
- 2018–19 CEV Champions League – "Most valuable player"
- 2019 Italian Super Cup – "Most valuable player"
- 2019 FIVB Volleyball Women's Club World Championship – "Most valuable player"
- 2020–21 Italian Cup (Coppa Italia) – "Most valuable player"
- 2020–21 Italian League – "Most valuable player"
- 2020–21 CEV Champions League – "Most valuable player"
- 2021 CEV EuroVolley – "Most valuable player"
- 2021 European Volleyball Confederation "Female Volleyball Player of the Year 2021"
- 2021–22 Italian Cup (Coppa Italia) – "Most valuable player"
- 2021–22 Italian League – "Top scorer"
- 2021–22 Italian League – "Most valuable player"
- 2022 FIVB Nations League – "Best opposite hitter"
- 2022 FIVB Nations League – "Most valuable player"
- 2022–23 Turkish Women's Volleyball Cup – "Most valuable player"
- 2022–23 CEV Champions League – "Most valuable player"
- 2024 FIVB Nations League – "Best opposite hitter"
- 2024 FIVB Nations League – "Most valuable player"
- 2024 Olympic Games Paris – "Best opposite hitter"
- 2024 Olympic Games Paris – "Most valuable player"
- 2024 Volleyball World – "Best World Women Volleyball Player of the Year 2024"
- 2024–25 CEV Champions League – "Best opposite hitter"
- 2025 FIVB Nations League – "Best opposite hitter"
- 2025 Italian Super Cup – "Most valuable player"
- 2025 Gazzetta Sports Awards – "Athlete of the Year"

=== Honours ===
- 2024 Order of Merit of the Italian Republic : 4th Class / Officer

Awards
Preceded by (Brazil) Sheilla Castro	Best Opposite Spiker of World Championship; 2018	Succeeded by (Serbia) Tijana Bošković
Preceded by (United States) Michelle Bartsch-Hackley - (Turkey) Melissa Vargas	Most Valuable Player of FIVB Nations League; 2022; 2024	Succeeded by (Turkey) Melissa Vargas - (Italy) Monica De Gennaro
Preceded by (Brazil) Tandara Caixeta - (Turkey) Melissa Vargas	Best Opposite Hitter of FIVB Nations League; 2022; 2024; 2025	Succeeded by (Turkey) Melissa Vargas - TBD
Preceded by (China) Zhu Ting	Most Valuable Player of FIVB Club World Championship; 2019	Succeeded by (Sweden) Isabelle Haak
Preceded by (United States) Jordan Larson	Most Valuable Player of the Olympic Games; 2024	Succeeded by TBD
Preceded by (Serbia) Tijana Bošković	Best Opposite Spiker of the Olympic Games; 2024	Succeeded by TBD
