= Anna Danesi =

Italian volleyball player (born 1996)

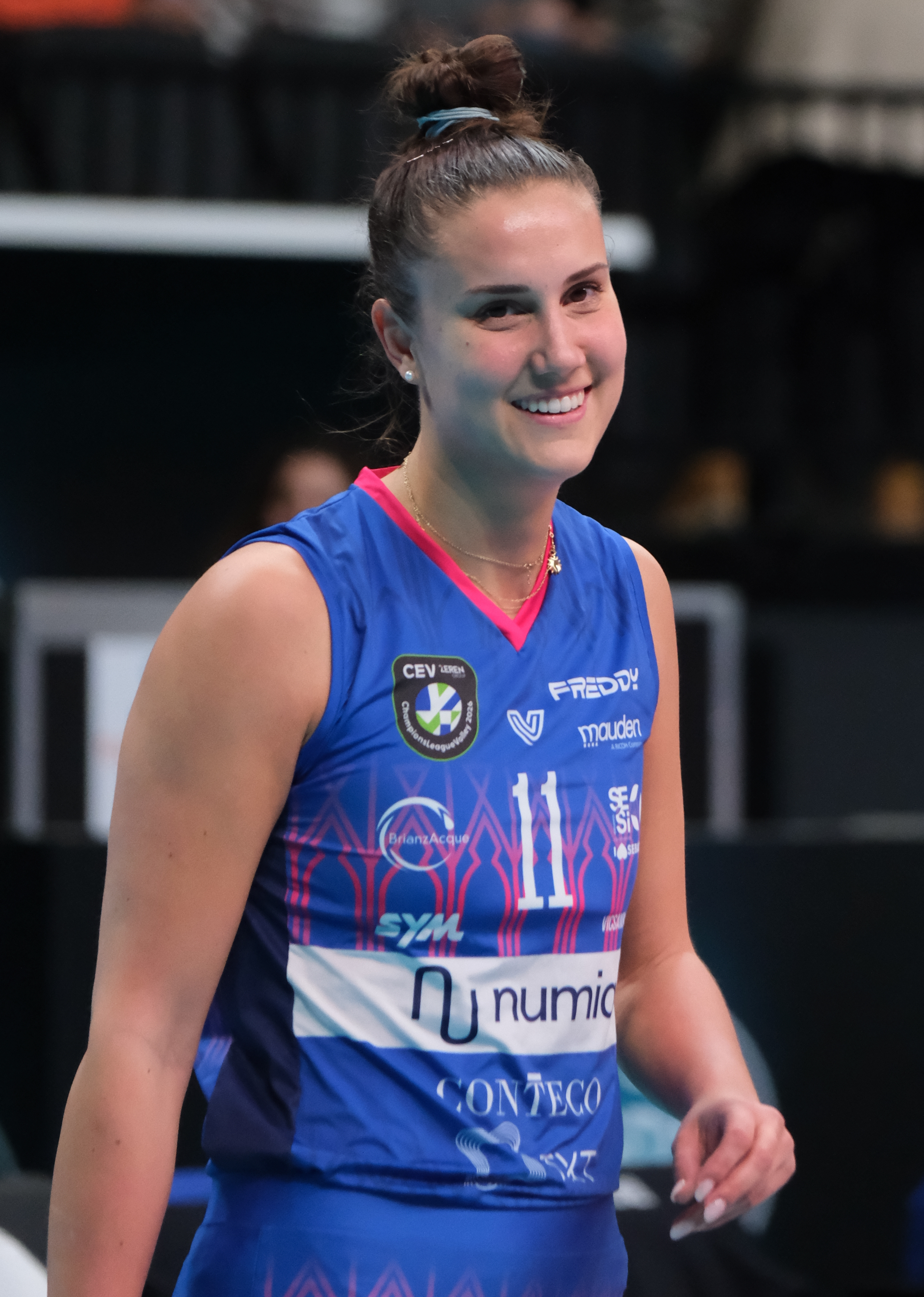
- Danesi playing for Vero Volley Milano in 2026

Personal information
- Born: 20 April 1996 (age 30); Brescia, Italy
- Height: 1.98 m (6 ft 6 in)
- Weight: 77 kg (170 lb)
- Spike: 315 cm (124 in)
- Block: 306 cm (120 in)

Volleyball information
- Position: Middle blocker
- Current club: Vero Volley Milano
- Number: 11

Career
Years	Teams
2016–2019	Imoco Volley Conegliano
2019–2022	Saugella Monza
2022–2024	Igor Gorgonzola Novara
2024–	Vero Volley Milano

National team
2016–	Italy
Honours
Women's volleyball
Representing Italy
Olympic Games
Gold medal – first place	2024 Paris	Team
FIVB World Championship
Gold medal – first place	2025 Thailand	Team
Silver medal – second place	2018 Japan	Team
Bronze medal – third place	2022 Poland/Netherlands	Team
FIVB Nations League
Gold medal – first place	2022 Ankara	Team
Gold medal – first place	2024 Bangkok	Team
Gold medal – first place	2025 Łódź	Team
Bronze medal – third place	2026 Macau	Team
FIVB World Grand Prix
Silver medal – second place	2017 Nanjing	Team
European Championship
Gold medal – first place	2021 Serbia/Bulgaria/Croatia/Romania	Team
Bronze medal – third place	2019 Turkey	Team
Silver medal – second place	2026 Azerbaijan-Czechia-Sweden-Turkey	Team

Anna Danesi (born 20 April 1996) is an Italian professional volleyball player. She is currently serving as the captain of the Italy women's national volleyball team.

With the national team she competed three times in the Summer Olympics at Rio, Tokyo, and Paris where she won the gold medal and individual award as "best middle blocker".

== Awards ==
=== Clubs ===
- 2016 Italian Supercup – Champions, with Imoco Volley Conegliano
- 2016–17 Italian Cup (Coppa Italia) – Champions, with Imoco Volley Conegliano
- 2016–17 CEV Champions League – Runner-Up, with Imoco Volley Conegliano
- 2017–18 Italian League – Champion, with Imoco Volley Conegliano
- 2018 Italian Supercup – Champions, with Imoco Volley Conegliano
- 2018–19 Italian League – Champion, with Imoco Volley Conegliano
- 2018–19 CEV Champions League – Runner-Up, with Imoco Volley Conegliano
- 2020–21 CEV Cup – Champion, with Saugella Monza
- 2023–24 CEV Challenge Cup – Champion, with Igor Gorgonzola Novara

=== Individuals ===
- 2015 FIVB Volleyball Women's U20 World Championship "Best Middle Blocker"
- 2021 Women's European Volleyball Championship "Best Middle Blocker"
- 2022 FIVB Volleyball Women's World Championship "Best Middle Blocker"
- 2024 Olympic Games Paris "Best Middle Blocker"
- 2025 FIVB World Championship "Best Middle Blocker"

Awards
Preceded by (Brazil) Carol Gattaz and (United States) Haleigh Washington	Best Middle Blocker of Olympic Games; 2024 (with (United States) Chiaka Ogbogu)	Succeeded by Incumbent
Preceded by (China) Yan Ni and (Serbia) Milena Rašić	Best Middle Blocker of FIVB World Championship; 2022 (with (Brazil) Ana Carolina da Silva); 2025 (with (Turkey) Eda Erdem)	Succeeded by Incumbent
