= Alessia Orro =

Italian volleyball player (born 1998)

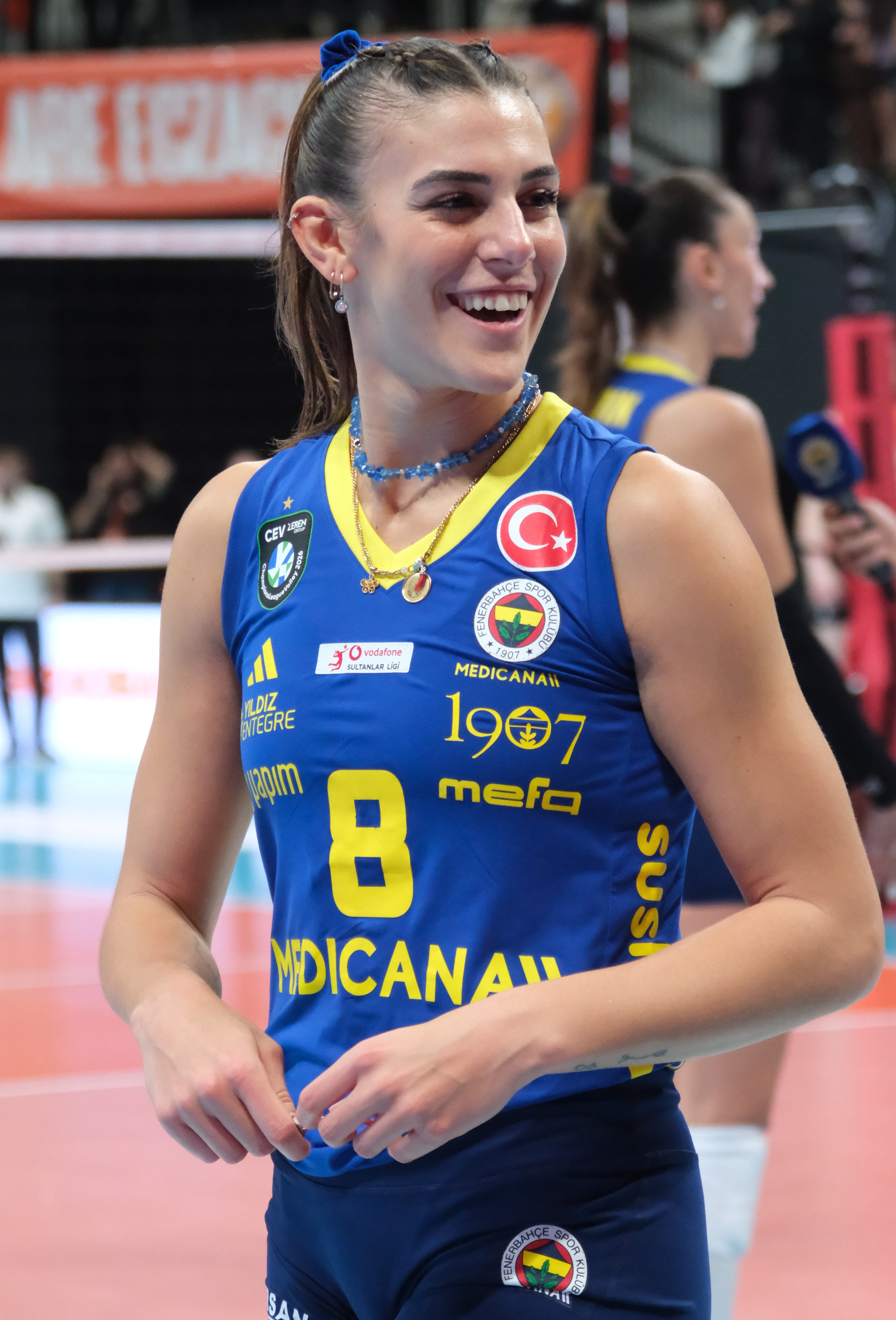
- Orro playing for Fenerbahçe in 2025

Personal information
- Born: 18 July 1998 (age 28); Oristano, Italy
- Height: 178 cm (5 ft 10 in)
- Spike: 304 cm (120 in)
- Block: 285 cm (112 in)

Volleyball information
- Position: Setter
- Current club: Fenerbahçe

Career
Years	Teams
2013–2017; 2017–2020; 2020–2025; 2025–	(Italy) Club Italia (Italy) Unet E-Work Busto Arsizio (Italy) Numia Vero Volley Milano (Turkey) Fenerbahçe

National team
2017–	Italy
Honours
Women's volleyball
Representing Italy
Olympic Games
Gold medal – first place	2024 Paris	Team
FIVB World Championship
Gold medal – first place	2025 Thailand	Team
Bronze medal – third place	2022 Poland/Netherlands	Team
FIVB Nations League
Gold medal – first place	2022 Ankara	Team
Gold medal – first place	2024 Bangkok	Team
Gold medal – first place	2025 Łódź	Team
Bronze medal – third place	2026 Macau	Team
FIVB World Grand Prix
Silver medal – second place	2017 Nanjing
European Championship
Gold medal – first place	2021 Serbia/Bulgaria/Croatia/Romania	Team
Bronze medal – third place	2019 Turkey	Team
Silver medal – second place	2026 Azerbaijan-Czechia-Sweden-Turkey	Team

Alessia Orro (born 18 July 1998) is an Italian professional volleyball player who plays as a setter for Fenerbahçe and the Italy women's national volleyball team.

She competed in the women's tournament at the 2016 Summer Olympics, 2020 Summer Olympics and 2024 Summer Olympics, the 2019 Montreux Volley Masters, and the 2022 FIVB Volleyball Women's Nations League.

== Career ==
Originally from Narbolia, in the province of Oristano, her career began at Ariete, a club of which she was part of both the youth team and the first team in Serie C, playing as a middle blocker and opposite, she remained linked to the Sardinian club until 2013.

In the 2013–14 season she joined the federal team of Club Italia, also changing her role to setter, in four years of permanence, she played in the Serie B1 championship followed by the Serie A2 in the 2014–15 season and the Serie A1 in the 2015–16 season.

In the 2017–18 season she was signed with Unet E-Work Busto Arsizio, in Serie A1, with whom she won the 2018-19 CEV Cup.

After three years with Unet E-Work Busto Arsizio, she moved to Numia Vero Volley Milano for the 2020–21 season, won the CEV Cup, where she was awarded MVP.

On 8 June 2025, she moved to Turkish powerhouse Fenerbahçe.

== Awards ==
=== Club ===
- 2018-19 CEV Challenge Cup - Champion, with Unet E-Work Busto Arsizio
- 2019–20 Coppa Italia - 2nd place, with Unet E-Work Busto Arsizio
- 2020-21 CEV Cup - Champion, with Unet E-Work Busto Arsizio
- 2021–22 FIPAV Serie A1 - 2nd place, with Numia Vero Volley Milano
- 2022–23 FIPAV Serie A1 - 2nd place, with Numia Vero Volley Milano
- 2022–23 Coppa Italia - 2nd place, with Numia Vero Volley Milano
- 2023-24 CEV Champions League - 2nd place, with Numia Vero Volley Milano
- 2023–24 Coppa Italia - 2nd place, with Numia Vero Volley Milano
- 2024 FIVB Volleyball Women's Club World Championship - 3rd place, with Numia Vero Volley Milano
- 2024-25 CEV Champions League - 3rd place, with Numia Vero Volley Milano
- 2024–25 FIPAV Serie A1 - 2nd place, with Numia Vero Volley Milano
- 2024–25 Coppa Italia - 2nd place, with Numia Vero Volley Milano
- 2025 Turkish Super Cup - Champion, with Fenerbahçe

=== National ===
- 2017 Volleyball World Grand Prix - 2nd place
- 2019 Montreux Volley Masters - 3rd place
- 2019 Women's European Volleyball Championship - 3rd place
- 2021 Women's European Volleyball Championship - Champion
- 2022 Women's Volleyball World Championship - 3rd place
- 2022 Women's Volleyball Nations League - Champion
- 2024 Women's Volleyball Nations League - Champion
- 2024 Summer Olympics - Champion
- 2025 Women's Volleyball Nations League - Champion
- 2025 FIVB Volleyball Women's World Championship - Champion

=== Individuals ===
- 2020-21 CEV Cup MVP
- 2021 Women's European Volleyball Championship "Best Setter"
- 2021–22 FIPAV Serie A1 "Best Setter"
- 2022 FIVB Nations League "Best Setter"
- 2022–23 FIPAV Serie A1 "Best Setter"
- 2024 FIVB Nations League "Best Setter"
- 2024-25 CEV Champions League "Best Setter"
- 2024 Olympic Games Paris "Best Setter"
- 2025 FIVB Nations League "Best Setter"
- 2025 FIVB World Championship "MVP"
- 2025 FIVB World Championship – "Best Setter"

=== Honors ===
- Knights of the Order of Merit of the Italian Republic: 20 September 2021

Awards
Preceded by (Serbia) Maja Ognjenović	Best Setter of the European Volleyball Championship; 2021	Succeeded by (Turkey) Cansu Özbay
Preceded by (United States) Jordyn Poulter	Best Setter of the FIVB Nations League; 2022	Succeeded by (China) Diao Linyu
Preceded by (China) Diao Linyu	Best Setter of the FIVB Nations League; 2024; 2025	Succeeded by TBD
Preceded by (United States) Jordyn Poulter	Best Setter of the Olympic Games; 2024	Succeeded by TBD
Preceded by (Serbia) Tijana Bošković	MVP of World Championship; 2025	Succeeded by TBD
Preceded by (Poland) Joanna Wołosz	Best Setter of World Championship; 2025	Succeeded by TBD
