= Volleyball at the 2024 Summer Olympics – Women's tournament =

Women's volleyball at the Games of the XXXIII Olympiad
- Venue: South Paris Arena 1
- Date: 28 July – 11 August
- Competitors: 144 from 12 nations

Medalists
1st place, gold medalist(s)		Italy (1st title)
2nd place, silver medalist(s)		United States
3rd place, bronze medalist(s)		Brazil

The women's tournament in volleyball at the 2024 Summer Olympics was the 16th edition of the event at the Summer Olympics, organised by the world's governing body, the FIVB, in conjunction with the IOC. It was held in Paris, France from 28 July to 11 August 2024. This was the first time in the history competition, each team participating was entitled to include one non-competing (AP) athlete to replace an athlete for medical reasons. As such, team rosters increased from 12 to 13 athletes.

== Competition schedule ==
The match schedule was announced on 26 June 2024.

P	Preliminary round	¼	Quarterfinals	½	Semifinals	B	Bronze medal match	F	Final

Sun 28	Mon 29	Tue 30	Wed 31	Thu 1	Fri 2	Sat 3	Sun 4	Mon 5	Tue 6	Wed 7	Thu 8	Fri 9	Sat 10	Sun 11
P	P		P	P		P	P		¼		½		B	F

== Qualification ==
Qualification		Date	Venue	Berths	Qualified team
Host nation		—N/a		1	France
FIVB Olympic Qualification Tournaments	Pool A	16–24 September 2023	(China) Ningbo	2	Dominican Republic
FIVB Olympic Qualification Tournaments	Pool A	16–24 September 2023	(China) Ningbo	2	Serbia
FIVB Olympic Qualification Tournaments	Pool B	16–24 September 2023	(Japan) Tokyo	2	Turkey
FIVB Olympic Qualification Tournaments	Pool B	16–24 September 2023	(Japan) Tokyo	2	Brazil
FIVB Olympic Qualification Tournaments	Pool C	16–24 September 2023	(Poland) Łódź	2	United States
FIVB Olympic Qualification Tournaments	Pool C	16–24 September 2023	(Poland) Łódź	2	Poland
World Ranking qualification pathway		17 June 2024	—N/a	5	Italy
World Ranking qualification pathway		17 June 2024	—N/a	5	China
World Ranking qualification pathway		17 June 2024	—N/a	5	Japan
World Ranking qualification pathway		17 June 2024	—N/a	5	Netherlands
World Ranking qualification pathway		17 June 2024	—N/a	5	Kenya
Total				12	

== Format ==
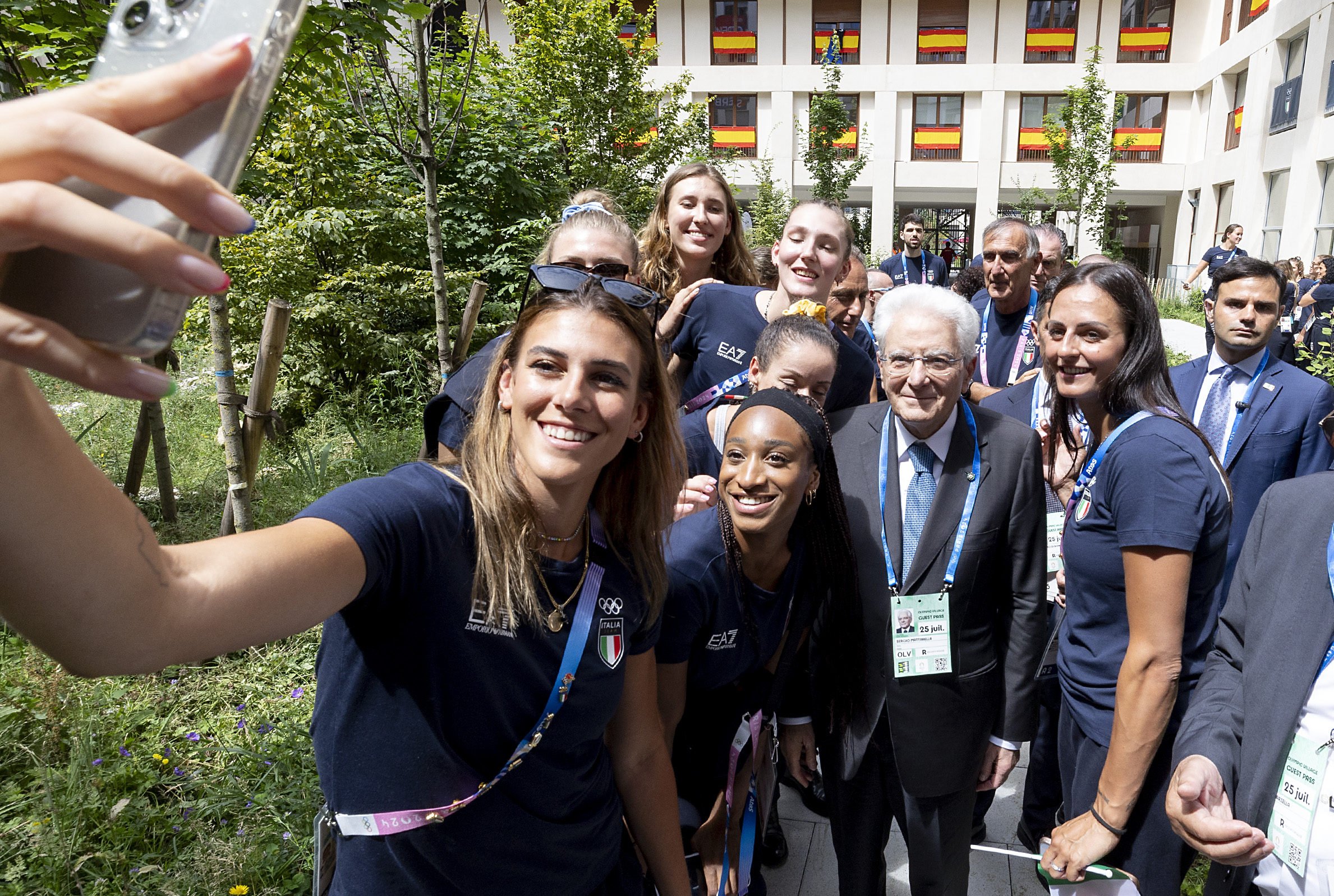
The Italy national team with the President of the Italian Republic Sergio Mattarella at the Olympic Village, 25 July 2024

In a change of format compared to the previous nine editions of the Olympic Games, this tournament featured three groups with four teams each during the preliminary round (between 1972 Summer Olympics to 2020 Summer Olympics the teams were placed in two groups). At this round, the teams competed in a single round-robin format. The two highest ranked teams in each pool and the best two third-placed teams advanced to the knockout stage (quarterfinals).

The knockout stage followed the single-elimination format. The match-ups were determined by teams combined ranking system, #1 vs #8 (QF1), #2 vs #7 (QF2), #3 vs #6 (QF3), #4 vs #5 (QF4). The winners advanced to semifinals, QF1 vs QF4, QF3 vs QF2. The losers competed for bronze medals and the winners competed for gold medals.

== Draw ==
The twelve qualified teams were seeded according to their position in the FIVB World Ranking as of 17 June 2024. As the host team, France was seeded first and placed in the top position of Pool A. The two top ranked teams seeded second and third were placed at the top of Pools B and C respectively. The remaining nine teams were distributed across three bowls of three teams each based on their position in the World Ranking and drawn for their seed line by line applying the serpentine system. The draw took place on 19 June 2024. Rankings are shown in brackets except the hosts who ranked 19th.

=== Seeding ===
Seeded teams	Pot 1	Pot 2	Pot 3
France (Hosts); Brazil (1); Italy (2)	Turkey (3); Poland (4); United States (5)	China (6); Japan (7); Netherlands (8)	Serbia (9); Dominican Republic (11); Kenya (20)

=== Pools composition ===
Pool A	Pool B	Pool C
France	Brazil	Italy
United States	Poland	Turkey
China	Japan	Netherlands
Serbia	Kenya	Dominican Republic

== Pool standing procedure and teams combined ranking system ==
Pool standing procedure
In order to establish the ranking of teams after the group stage, the following criteria was implemented:

1. Number of matches won
2. Match points
3. Sets ratio
4. Points ratio
5. Result of the last match between the tied teams

Match won 3–0 or 3–1: 3 match points for the winner, 0 match points for the loser
Match won 3–2: 2 match points for the winner, 1 match point for the loser

Teams combined ranking system
In order to determine teams playing in quarterfinals and their match-ups:

1. Pool Position
2. Number of matches won
3. Match points
4. Sets ratio
5. Points ratio
6. Head-to-head
7. World ranking

== Referees ==
The following referees were selected for the tournament.

- (Argentina) Karina Rene
- (Brazil) Angela Grass
- (Bulgaria) Ivaylo Ivanov
- (Canada) Scott Dziewirz
- (China) Wang Ziling
- (Dominican Republic) Denny Cespedes
- (Egypt) Wael Kandil
- (France) Fabrice Collados
- (Greece) Epaminondas Gerothodoros
- (Italy) Stefano Cesare
- (Japan) Sumie Myoi
- (Poland) Wojciech Maroszek
- (Slovakia) Juraj Mokrý
- (Switzerland) Vladimir Simonović
- (Turkey) Nurper Özbar
- (United Arab Emirates) Hamid Al-Rousi

== Preliminary round ==
- All times are Central European Summer Time (UTC+02:00).

=== Pool A ===
Pos	Team	Pld	W	L	Pts	SW	SL	SR	SPW	SPL	SPR	Qualification
1	China	3	3	0	8	9	3	3.000	277	249	1.112	Quarter-finals
2	United States	3	2	1	6	8	5	1.600	286	278	1.029	Quarter-finals
3	Serbia	3	1	2	4	6	6	1.000	271	257	1.054	Quarter-finals
4	France (H)	3	0	3	0	0	9	0.000	183	233	0.785	

Source: Olympics
Rules for classification: Tiebreakers
(H) Host

29 July 2024; 17:00	United States	2–3	China	South Paris Arena 1, Paris; Attendance: 9,434; Referees: Sumie Myoi (JPN), Karina Rene (ARG)
29 July 2024; 17:00	(20–25, 19–25, 25–17, 25–20, 13–15); P2 Report			South Paris Arena 1, Paris; Attendance: 9,434; Referees: Sumie Myoi (JPN), Karina Rene (ARG)

29 July 2024; 21:00	France	0–3	Serbia	South Paris Arena 1, Paris; Attendance: 9,350; Referees: Nurper Özbar (TUR), Epaminondas Gerothodoros (GRE)
29 July 2024; 21:00	(17–25, 17–25, 22–25); P2 Report			South Paris Arena 1, Paris; Attendance: 9,350; Referees: Nurper Özbar (TUR), Epaminondas Gerothodoros (GRE)

31 July 2024; 17:00	United States	3–2	Serbia	South Paris Arena 1, Paris; Attendance: 9,384; Referees: Juraj Mokrý (SVK), Karina Rene (ARG)
31 July 2024; 17:00	(25–17, 25–20, 20–25, 14–25, 17–15); P2 Report			South Paris Arena 1, Paris; Attendance: 9,384; Referees: Juraj Mokrý (SVK), Karina Rene (ARG)

1 August 2024; 21:00	France	0–3	China	South Paris Arena 1, Paris; Attendance: 9,434; Referees: Wael Kandil (EGY), Ivaylo Ivanov (BUL)
1 August 2024; 21:00	(18–25, 16–25, 19–25); P2 Report			South Paris Arena 1, Paris; Attendance: 9,434; Referees: Wael Kandil (EGY), Ivaylo Ivanov (BUL)

4 August 2024; 13:00	France	0–3	United States	South Paris Arena 1, Paris; Attendance: 9,402; Referees: Ivaylo Ivanov (BUL), Scott Dziewirz (CAN)
4 August 2024; 13:00	(27–29, 27–29, 20–25); P2 Report			South Paris Arena 1, Paris; Attendance: 9,402; Referees: Ivaylo Ivanov (BUL), Scott Dziewirz (CAN)

4 August 2024; 17:00	China	3–1	Serbia	South Paris Arena 1, Paris; Attendance: 9,395; Referees: Karina Rene (ARG), Angela Grass (BRA)
4 August 2024; 17:00	(21–25, 25–20, 25–22, 29–27); P2 Report			South Paris Arena 1, Paris; Attendance: 9,395; Referees: Karina Rene (ARG), Angela Grass (BRA)

=== Pool B ===
Pos	Team	Pld	W	L	Pts	SW	SL	SR	SPW	SPL	SPR	Qualification
1	Brazil	3	3	0	9	9	0	MAX	238	165	1.442	Quarter-finals
2	Poland	3	2	1	6	6	4	1.500	244	230	1.061	Quarter-finals
3	Japan	3	1	2	3	4	6	0.667	226	224	1.009	
4	Kenya	3	0	3	0	0	9	0.000	136	225	0.604	

Source: Olympics
Rules for classification: Tiebreakers

28 July 2024; 13:00	Poland	3–1	Japan	South Paris Arena 1, Paris; Attendance: 9,162; Referees: Karina Rene (ARG), Wang Ziling (CHN)
28 July 2024; 13:00	(20–25, 25–22, 25–23, 28–26); P2 Report			South Paris Arena 1, Paris; Attendance: 9,162; Referees: Karina Rene (ARG), Wang Ziling (CHN)

29 July 2024; 13:00	Brazil	3–0	Kenya	South Paris Arena 1, Paris; Attendance: 9,275; Referees: Wang Ziling (CHN), Juraj Mokrý (SVK)
29 July 2024; 13:00	(25–14, 25–13, 25–12); P2 Report			South Paris Arena 1, Paris; Attendance: 9,275; Referees: Wang Ziling (CHN), Juraj Mokrý (SVK)

31 July 2024; 21:00	Poland	3–0	Kenya	South Paris Arena 1, Paris; Attendance: 9,447; Referees: Angela Grass (BRA), Wael Kandil (EGY)
31 July 2024; 21:00	(25–14, 25–17, 25–15); P2 Report			South Paris Arena 1, Paris; Attendance: 9,447; Referees: Angela Grass (BRA), Wael Kandil (EGY)

1 August 2024; 13:00	Brazil	3–0	Japan	South Paris Arena 1, Paris; Attendance: 9,410; Referees: Epaminondas Gerothodoros (GRE), Nurper Özbar (TUR)
1 August 2024; 13:00	(25–20, 25–17, 25–18); P2 Report			South Paris Arena 1, Paris; Attendance: 9,410; Referees: Epaminondas Gerothodoros (GRE), Nurper Özbar (TUR)

3 August 2024; 13:00	Japan	3–0	Kenya	South Paris Arena 1, Paris; Attendance: 9,439; Referees: Hamid Al-Rousi (UAE), Angela Grass (BRA)
3 August 2024; 13:00	(25–17, 25–22, 25–12); P2 Report			South Paris Arena 1, Paris; Attendance: 9,439; Referees: Hamid Al-Rousi (UAE), Angela Grass (BRA)

4 August 2024; 21:00	Brazil	3–0	Poland	South Paris Arena 1, Paris; Attendance: 9,505; Referees: Fabrice Collados (FRA), Denny Cespedes (DOM)
4 August 2024; 21:00	(25–21, 38–36, 25–14); P2 Report			South Paris Arena 1, Paris; Attendance: 9,505; Referees: Fabrice Collados (FRA), Denny Cespedes (DOM)

=== Pool C ===
Pos	Team	Pld	W	L	Pts	SW	SL	SR	SPW	SPL	SPR	Qualification
1	Italy	3	3	0	9	9	1	9.000	253	199	1.271	Quarter-finals
2	Turkey	3	2	1	5	6	6	1.000	250	262	0.954	Quarter-finals
3	Dominican Republic	3	1	2	3	5	7	0.714	264	284	0.930	Quarter-finals
4	Netherlands	3	0	3	1	3	9	0.333	260	282	0.922	

Source: Olympics
Rules for classification: Tiebreakers

28 July 2024; 09:00	Italy	3–1	Dominican Republic	South Paris Arena 1, Paris; Attendance: 9,368; Referees: Nurper Özbar (TUR), Angela Grass (BRA)
28 July 2024; 09:00	(25–19, 24–26, 25–21, 25–18); P2 Report			South Paris Arena 1, Paris; Attendance: 9,368; Referees: Nurper Özbar (TUR), Angela Grass (BRA)

29 July 2024; 09:00	Turkey	3–2	Netherlands	South Paris Arena 1, Paris; Attendance: 9,471; Referees: Denny Cespedes (DOM), Stefano Cesare (ITA)
29 July 2024; 09:00	(19–25, 19–25, 25–22, 25–22, 15–13); P2 Report			South Paris Arena 1, Paris; Attendance: 9,471; Referees: Denny Cespedes (DOM), Stefano Cesare (ITA)

1 August 2024; 09:00	Turkey	3–1	Dominican Republic	South Paris Arena 1, Paris; Attendance: 9,465; Referees: Karina Rene (ARG), Fabrice Collados (FRA)
1 August 2024; 09:00	(21–25, 25–18, 25–22, 25–15); P2 Report			South Paris Arena 1, Paris; Attendance: 9,465; Referees: Karina Rene (ARG), Fabrice Collados (FRA)

1 August 2024; 17:00	Italy	3–0	Netherlands	South Paris Arena 1, Paris; Attendance: 9,400; Referees: Angela Grass (BRA), Sumie Myoi (JPN)
1 August 2024; 17:00	(29–27, 25–18, 25–19); P2 Report			South Paris Arena 1, Paris; Attendance: 9,400; Referees: Angela Grass (BRA), Sumie Myoi (JPN)

3 August 2024; 09:00	Netherlands	1–3	Dominican Republic	South Paris Arena 1, Paris; Attendance: 9,433; Referees: Scott Dziewirz (CAN), Ivaylo Ivanov (BUL)
3 August 2024; 09:00	(25–22, 21–25, 17–25, 26–28); P2 Report			South Paris Arena 1, Paris; Attendance: 9,433; Referees: Scott Dziewirz (CAN), Ivaylo Ivanov (BUL)

4 August 2024; 09:00	Italy	3–0	Turkey	South Paris Arena 1, Paris; Attendance: 9,384; Referees: Sumie Myoi (JPN), Hamid Al-Rousi (UAE)
4 August 2024; 09:00	(25–14, 25–16, 25–21); P2 Report			South Paris Arena 1, Paris; Attendance: 9,384; Referees: Sumie Myoi (JPN), Hamid Al-Rousi (UAE)

=== Combined ranking ===
Pos	Pool	Team	Pld	W	L	Pts	SW	SL	SR	SPW	SPL	SPR	Notes
1	B	Brazil	3	3	0	9	9	0	MAX	238	165	1.442	First in each of the pools
2	C	Italy	3	3	0	9	9	1	9.000	253	199	1.271	First in each of the pools
3	A	China	3	3	0	8	9	3	3.000	277	249	1.112	First in each of the pools
4	A	United States	3	2	1	6	8	5	1.600	286	278	1.029	Second in each of the pools
5	B	Poland	3	2	1	6	6	4	1.500	244	230	1.061	Second in each of the pools
6	C	Turkey	3	2	1	5	6	6	1.000	250	262	0.954	Second in each of the pools
7	A	Serbia	3	1	2	4	6	6	1.000	271	257	1.054	Third in each of the pools
8	C	Dominican Republic	3	1	2	3	5	7	0.714	264	284	0.930	Third in each of the pools
9	B	Japan	3	1	2	3	4	6	0.667	226	224	1.009	Third in the pool
10	C	Netherlands	3	0	3	1	3	9	0.333	260	282	0.922	Fourth in each of the pools
11	A	France (H)	3	0	3	0	0	9	0.000	183	233	0.785	Fourth in each of the pools
12	B	Kenya	3	0	3	0	0	9	0.000	136	225	0.604	Fourth in each of the pools

Source: Olympics
Rules for classification: Tiebreakers
(H) Host

== Knockout stage ==
=== Bracket ===
Quarter-finals
6 August
Brazil	3
Dominican Republic	0
6 August
United States	3
Poland	0
6 August
China	2
Turkey	3
6 August
Italy	3
Serbia	0

Semi-finals
8 August
Brazil	2
United States	3
8 August
Turkey	0
Italy	3

Gold medal match
11 August
United States	0
Italy	3
Bronze medal match
10 August
Brazil	3
Turkey	1

=== Quarter-finals ===
6 August 2024; 09:00	China	2–3	Turkey	South Paris Arena 1, Paris; Attendance: 9,271; Referees: Scott Dziewirz (CAN), Hamid Al-Rousi (UAE)
6 August 2024; 09:00	(25–23, 21–25, 24–26, 25–21, 12–15); P2 Report			South Paris Arena 1, Paris; Attendance: 9,271; Referees: Scott Dziewirz (CAN), Hamid Al-Rousi (UAE)

6 August 2024; 13:00	Brazil	3–0	Dominican Republic	South Paris Arena 1, Paris; Attendance: 9,315; Referees: Sumie Myoi (JPN), Stefano Cesare (ITA)
6 August 2024; 13:00	(25–22, 25–13, 25–17); P2 Report			South Paris Arena 1, Paris; Attendance: 9,315; Referees: Sumie Myoi (JPN), Stefano Cesare (ITA)

6 August 2024; 17:00	United States	3–0	Poland	South Paris Arena 1, Paris; Attendance: 9,244; Referees: Karina Rene (ARG), Vladimir Simonović (SUI)
6 August 2024; 17:00	(25–22, 25–14, 25–20); P2 Report			South Paris Arena 1, Paris; Attendance: 9,244; Referees: Karina Rene (ARG), Vladimir Simonović (SUI)

6 August 2024; 21:00	Italy	3–0	Serbia	South Paris Arena 1, Paris; Attendance: 9,253; Referees: Fabrice Collados (FRA), Epaminondas Gerothodoros (GRE)
6 August 2024; 21:00	(26–24, 25–20, 25–20); P2 Report			South Paris Arena 1, Paris; Attendance: 9,253; Referees: Fabrice Collados (FRA), Epaminondas Gerothodoros (GRE)

=== Semi-finals ===
8 August 2024; 16:00	Brazil	2–3	United States	South Paris Arena 1, Paris; Attendance: 9,253; Referees: Juraj Mokrý (SVK), Karina Rene (ARG)
8 August 2024; 16:00	(23–25, 25–18, 15–25, 25–23, 11–15); P2 Report			South Paris Arena 1, Paris; Attendance: 9,253; Referees: Juraj Mokrý (SVK), Karina Rene (ARG)

8 August 2024; 20:00	Turkey	0–3	Italy	South Paris Arena 1, Paris; Attendance: 9,309; Referees: Wojciech Maroszek (POL), Sumie Myoi (JPN)
8 August 2024; 20:00	(22–25, 19–25, 22–25); P2 Report			South Paris Arena 1, Paris; Attendance: 9,309; Referees: Wojciech Maroszek (POL), Sumie Myoi (JPN)

=== Bronze medal match ===
10 August 2024; 17:15	Brazil	3–1	Turkey	South Paris Arena 1, Paris; Attendance: 9,151; Referees: Sumie Myoi (JPN), Karina Rene (ARG)
10 August 2024; 17:15	(25–21, 27–25, 22–25, 25–15); P2 Report			South Paris Arena 1, Paris; Attendance: 9,151; Referees: Sumie Myoi (JPN), Karina Rene (ARG)

=== Gold medal match ===
11 August 2024; 13:00	United States	0–3	Italy	South Paris Arena 1, Paris; Attendance: 9,340; Referees: Fabrice Collados (FRA), Wojciech Maroszek (POL)
11 August 2024; 13:00	(18–25, 20–25, 17–25); P2 Report			South Paris Arena 1, Paris; Attendance: 9,340; Referees: Fabrice Collados (FRA), Wojciech Maroszek (POL)

== Final standing ==
Rank	Team
1st place, gold medalist(s)	Italy
2nd place, silver medalist(s)	United States
3rd place, bronze medalist(s)	Brazil
4	Turkey
5	China
6	Poland
7	Serbia
8	Dominican Republic
9	Japan
10	Netherlands
11	France
12	Kenya

2024 Women's Olympic champions

Italy
1st title

12–woman roster
Marina Lubian, Carlotta Cambi, Ilaria Spirito, Monica De Gennaro, Alessia Orro, Caterina Bosetti, Anna Danesi (c), Myriam Sylla, Paola Egonu, Sarah Fahr, Loveth Omoruyi, Ekaterina Antropova, Gaia Giovannini
Head coach
(Argentina) (Italy) Julio Velasco

== Medalists ==
Gold	Silver	Bronze
Italy Marina Lubian; Carlotta Cambi; Ilaria Spirito (L); Monica De Gennaro (L); Alessia Orro; Caterina Bosetti; Anna Danesi (c); Myriam Sylla; Paola Egonu; Sarah Fahr; Loveth Omoruyi; Ekaterina Antropova; Gaia Giovannini Head coach: Julio Velasco	United States Micha Hancock; Jordyn Poulter (c); Avery Skinner; Justine Wong-Orantes (L); Lauren Carlini; Jordan Larson; Annie Drews; Jordan Thompson; Haleigh Washington; Dana Rettke; Kathryn Plummer; Kelsey Robinson Cook; Chiaka Ogbogu Head coach: Karch Kiraly	Brazil Nyeme Costa (L); Diana Duarte; Macris Carneiro; Thaísa Menezes; Rosamaria Montibeller; Roberta Ratzke; Gabriela Guimarães (c); Ana Cristina de Souza; Natália Araújo (L); Ana Carolina da Silva; Júlia Bergmann; Tainara Santos; Lorenne Teixeira Head coach: Zé Roberto

== Awards ==
The awards were announced on 11 August 2024.

Position	Player
Most valuable player	(Italy) Paola Egonu
Setter	(Italy) Alessia Orro
Outside hitters	(Italy) Myriam Sylla
Outside hitters	(Brazil) Gabriela Guimarães
Middle blockers	(United States) Chiaka Ogbogu
Middle blockers	(Italy) Anna Danesi
Opposite spiker	(Italy) Paola Egonu
Libero	(Italy) Monica De Gennaro

== Statistics leaders ==
- Only players whose teams advanced to the semifinals are ranked.

Best scorers

Rank	Name	Points
1	(Turkey) Melissa Vargas	159
2	(Brazil) Gabriela Guimarães	110
2	(Italy) Paola Egonu	110
4	(United States) Andrea Drews	97
5	(Brazil) Ana Cristina de Souza	82

Best attackers

Rank	Name	%Eff
1	(Brazil) Gabriela Guimarães	37.38
2	(Italy) Paola Egonu	36.23
3	(Italy) Myriam Sylla	34.40
4	(United States) Andrea Drews	30.85
5	(Turkey) Melissa Vargas	29.39

Best blockers

Rank	Name	Avg
1	(Brazil) Ana Carolina da Silva	1.10
2	(Italy) Anna Danesi	1.05
3	(Brazil) Thaísa Menezes	0.95
4	(United States) Chiaka Ogbogu	0.88
5	(Turkey) Eda Erdem	0.58

Best servers

Rank	Name	Avg
1	(Italy) Paola Egonu	0.37
2	(Brazil) Ana Cristina de Souza	0.29
3	(United States) Jordyn Poulter	0.25
3	(United States) Haleigh Washington	0.25
3	(Turkey) Melissa Vargas	0.25
3	(United States) Kathryn Plummer	0.25

Best diggers

Rank	Name	Avg
1	(Brazil) Nyeme Costa	4.14
2	(Turkey) Gizem Örge	3.71
3	(Italy) Monica De Gennaro	3.37
4	(United States) Justine Wong-Orantes	3.21
5	(Italy) Alessia Orro	2.53

Best setters

Rank	Name	Avg
1	(United States) Jordyn Poulter	6.75
2	(Brazil) Roberta Ratzke	5.86
3	(Turkey) Elif Şahin	5.79
4	(Italy) Alessia Orro	5.53
5	(Turkey) Cansu Özbay	1.88

Best receivers

Rank	Name	%Succ
1	(Brazil) Gabriela Guimarães	75.96
2	(Brazil) Nyeme Costa	65.22
3	(Italy) Caterina Bosetti	62.63
4	(United States) Avery Skinner	53.90
5	(Turkey) Hande Baladın	52.14

== See also ==
- Volleyball at the Summer Olympics
- Volleyball at the 2024 Summer Olympics – Men's tournament
- Beach volleyball at the 2024 Summer Olympics – Women's tournament
- Sitting volleyball at the 2024 Summer Paralympics - Women's tournament
- 2024 FIVB Women's Volleyball Nations League
