= Hanna Orthmann =

German volleyball player

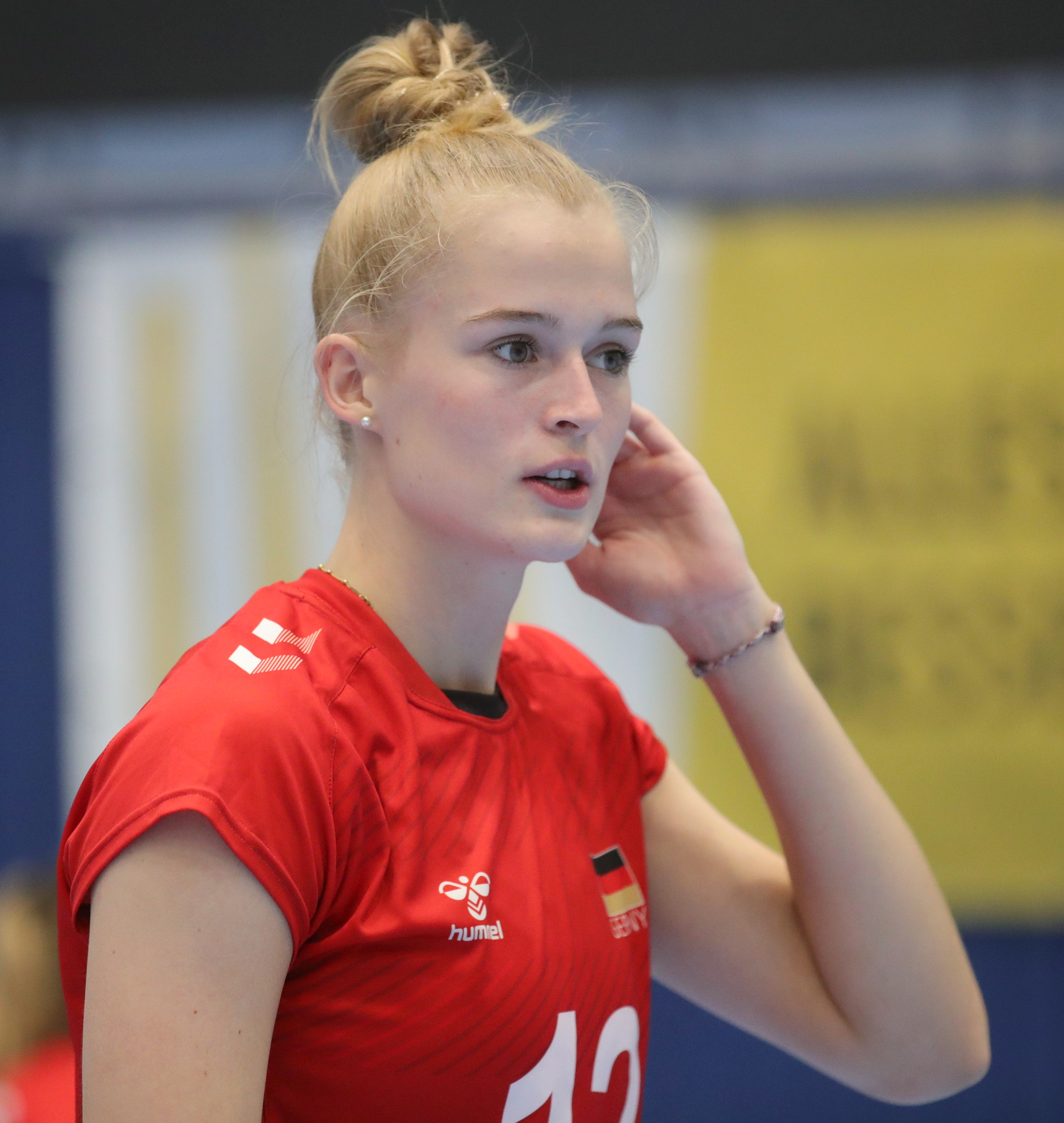
- Orthmann in 2022

Personal information
- Nationality: German
- Born: 3 October 1998 (age 28) Lüdinghausen, Germany
- Height: 1.88 m (6 ft 2 in)
- Weight: 74 kg (163 lb)
- Spike: 302 cm (119 in)
- Block: 291 cm (115 in)

Volleyball information
- Position: Outside hitter
- Current club: Igor Gorgonzola Novara
- Number: 12

Career
- Years: Team
- 2014–2017: USC Münster
- 2017–2021: Saugella Team Monza
- 2021: Savino Del Bene Scandicci
- 2022–2023: Türk Hava Yolları
- 2023–: Igor Gorgonzola Novara

National team
- Years: Team
- 2016–: Germany

Hanna Orthmann (born 3 October 1998) is a German volleyball player who is currently signed with Igor Gorgonzola Novara in the Italian Serie A1.

== Career ==
Hanna Orthmann played youth volleyball at SC Union 08 Lüdinghausen. In 2014 she came to the Volleyball training camp at USC Münster, where she first played in the youth team in the second Bundesliga Nord. At the end of 2015, she had their first Bundesliga appearance on 17 January 2016 in the 0–3 defeat against NawaRo Straubing. In 2017 she moved to the Italian Serie A to ProVictoria Pallavolo Monza.

From 2012 to 2016, Hanna Orthmann also played in the German youth and junior national team, including the 2015 FIVB U18 World Championship and the 2016 CEV U19 European Championship. At the 2016 FIVB World Grand Prix, Orthmann made her first appearance in the senior team.

== Awards ==
=== Individual ===
- 2020 European Olympic Qualification Tournament "Best outside spiker"
