= Elena Pietrini =

Italian volleyball player

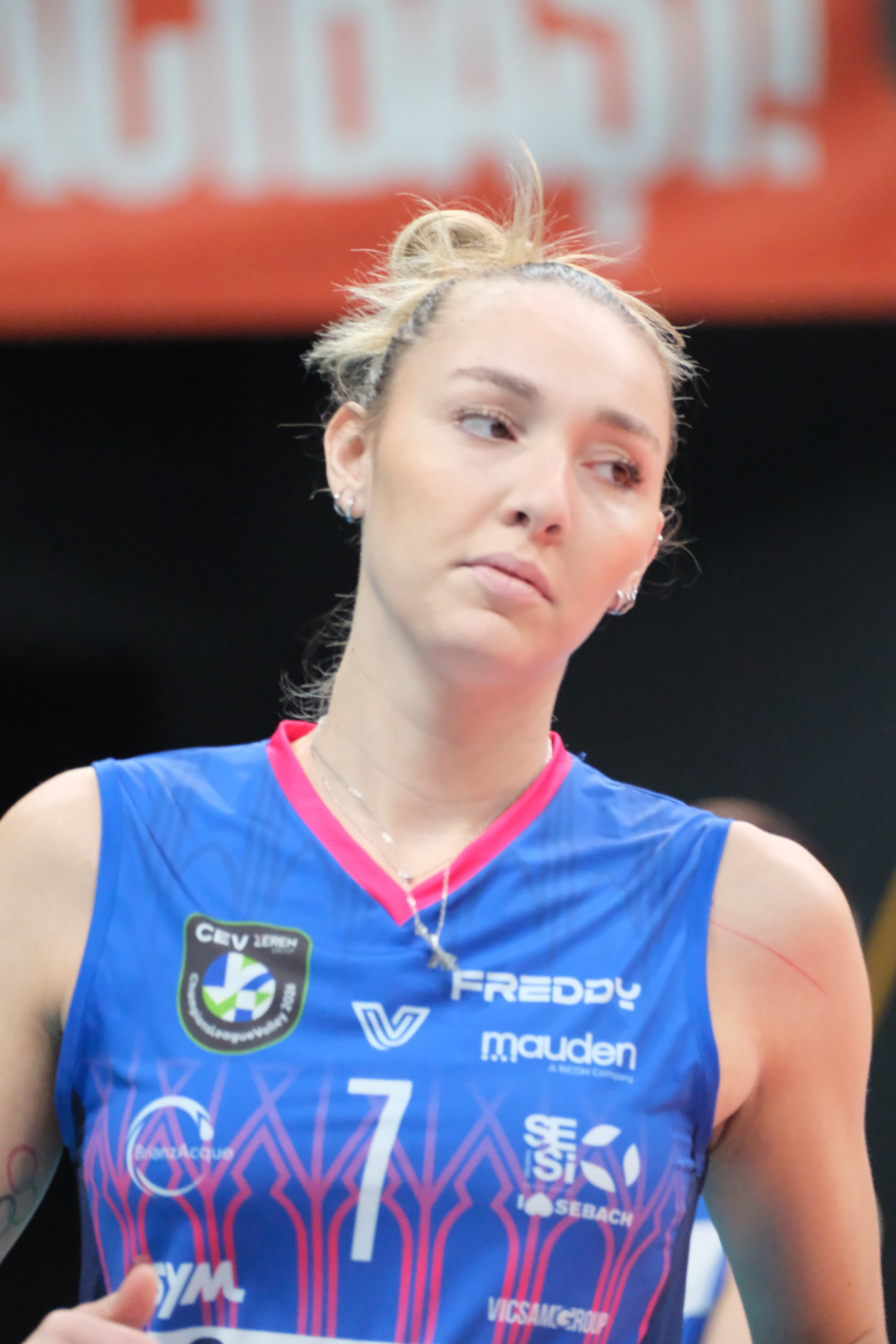
- Pietrini playing for Vero Volley Milano in 2026

Personal information
- Nationality: Italian
- Born: 17 March 2000 (age 26); Imola, Italy
- Height: 190 cm (6 ft 3 in)
- Weight: 73 kg (161 lb)
- Spike: 330 cm (130 in)
- Block: 306 cm (120 in)

Volleyball information
- Position: Wing spiker
- Current club: Dynamo Kazan
- Number: 7

National team
| 2018- | Italy |
Honours
Women's volleyball
Representing Italy
FIVB World Championship
| Silver medal – second place | 2018 Japan | Team |
| Bronze medal – third place | 2022 Poland/Netherlands | Team |
FIVB Nations League
| Gold medal – first place | 2022 Ankara | Team |
European Championship
| Gold medal – first place | 2021 Serbia/Bulgaria/Croatia/Romania | Team |
Montreux Volley Masters
| Bronze medal – third place | 2019 Montreux | Team |

Elena Pietrini (born 17 March 2000) is an Italian volleyball player who plays as a wing spiker for Volley Bergamo and the Italian national team. She made her debut appearance at the Olympics representing Italy at the 2020 Summer Olympics.

== Biography ==
Her father Alberto Pietrini was a professional basketball player who played at club level and her mother Laura Pietrini and her sister Giulia Pietrini were also volleyball players.

== Youth career ==
She was part of the youth national team which emerged as runners-up to Russia at the 2017 Girls' U18 Volleyball European Championship.

She was also a key member of the Italian U18 team which won the 2017 FIVB Volleyball Girls' U18 World Championship. For her tremendous performance during the 2017 FIVB Volleyball U18 World Championship she was awarded the MVP of the tournament. She also participated at the 2017 FIVB Volleyball Women's U20 World Championship where Italy finished at ninth position.

== Senior career ==
She was part of the Italian national team at the 2018 FIVB Volleyball Women's Nations League. She was also a member of the Italian squad which emerged as runner-up to Serbia at the 2018 FIVB Volleyball Women's World Championship.

She was also initially on the selection radar for the 2019 Women's European Volleyball Championship but she pulled out due to physical and mental fatigue. However, she competed at the 2019 FIVB Volleyball Women's Nations League. She was part of national side which claimed bronze medal at the 2019 Montreux Volley Masters.

She was included in the national squad to compete in the women's volleyball tournament at the 2020 Summer Olympics.
