= Teodora Pušić =

Serbian volleyball player

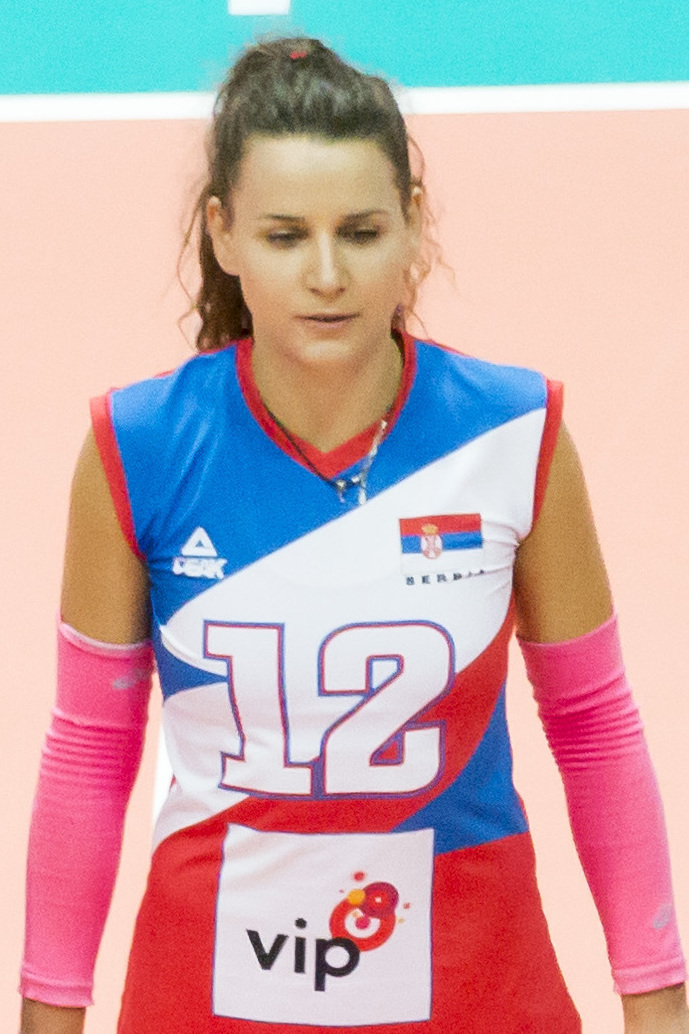

Personal information
- Nationality: Serbian
- Born: 12 March 1993 (age 33); Belgrade, Serbia, FR Yugoslavia
- Height: 1.70 m (5 ft 7 in)
- Weight: 58 kg (128 lb)
- Spike: 270 cm (106 in)
- Block: 260 cm (102 in)

Volleyball information
- Position: Libero
- Current club: Orlando Valkyries

National team
Serbia
Honours
World Championship
Gold medal – first place	2018 Japan	Team
Gold medal – first place	2022 Netherlands/Poland	Team
FIVB Nations League
Bronze medal – third place	2022 Ankara	Team
FIVB World Grand Prix
Bronze medal – third place	2017 Nanjing
European Championship
Gold medal – first place	2017 Azerbaijan/Georgia
Gold medal – first place	2019 Turkey
Silver medal – second place	2023 Belgium/Estonia/Germany/Italy

Teodora Pušić (Serbian Cyrillic: Теодора Пушић; born 12 March 1993) is a Serbian volleyball player for ŽOK Partizan and the Serbian national team.

She participated at the 2017 Women's European Volleyball Championship.

== Awards ==
=== National team ===
==== Senior team ====
- 2017 World Grand Prix - Bronze Medal
- 2017 European Championship - Gold Medal
- 2018 World Championship - Gold Medal
- 2019 European Championship - Gold Medal
- 2022 FIVB Nations League - Bronze Medal
- 2022 World Championship - Gold Medal

=== Individual awards ===
- 2022 World Championship "Best Libero"

Awards
Preceded by (Italy) Monica De Gennaro	Best Libero of FIVB World Championship; 2022	Succeeded by Incumbent
