= 2022 FIVB Women's Volleyball Nations League =

2022 FIVB Voleybol Milletler Ligi (Turkish)

Tournament details
- Host country: Turkey
- City: Ankara (final round)
- Dates: 31 May – 17 July
- Teams: 16 (from 4 confederations)
- Venue: 6 (in 6 host cities)

Final positions
- Champions: Italy (1st title)
- Runners-up: Brazil
- Third place: Serbia
- Fourth place: Turkey
- Relegated: Belgium

Tournament awards
- MVP: (Italy) Paola Egonu
- Best Setter: (Italy) Alessia Orro
- Best OH: (Italy) Caterina Bosetti; (Brazil) Gabriela Guimarães
- Best MB: (Serbia) Jovana Stevanović; (Brazil) Ana Carolina da Silva
- Best OPP: (Italy) Paola Egonu
- Best Libero: (Italy) Monica De Gennaro

Tournament statistics
- Matches played: 104
- Attendance: 256,881 (2,470 per match)

The 2022 FIVB Women's Volleyball Nations League was the fourth edition of the FIVB Women's Volleyball Nations League, an annual women's international volleyball tournament. It was held between May and July 2022, and the final round took place at the Ankara Arena in Ankara, Turkey.

Belgium were the last placed challenger team after the preliminary round and were replaced by 2022 Challenger Cup winners Croatia in the 2023 edition.

Italy claimed their first VNL medal and title after defeating Brazil in the final. Brazil took their third silver medal, consecutively. Serbia won their first medal of the tournament, claiming the bronze after defeating finals hosts Turkey in the third place match. Paola Egonu of Italy named as the MVP of the tournament.

== Teams ==
=== Qualification ===
As there was no promotion or relegation in the 2021 VNL, 15 of the same 16 teams in 2021 are competing in this year's edition.

On 1 March 2022, FIVB declared Russia and Belarus ineligible for international and continental competitions due to the Russian invasion of Ukraine. As a result, Russia was out of the Nations League. On 5 April, the FIVB announced Bulgaria would replace Russia in the competition.

| Country | Confederation | Designation | Previous appearances | | | Previous best performance |
| Country | Confederation | Designation | Total | First | Last | Previous best performance |
|---|---|---|---|---|---|---|
| Belgium | CEV | Challenger team | 3 | 2018 | 2021 | 7th place (2019) |
| Brazil | CSV | Core team | 3 | 2018 | 2021 | Runners-up (2019, 2021) |
| Bulgaria | CEV | Challenger team | 1 | 2019 | 2019 | 16th place (2019) |
| Canada | NORCECA | Challenger team | 1 | 2021 | 2021 | 14th place (2021) |
| China | AVC | Core team | 3 | 2018 | 2021 | 3rd place (2018, 2019) |
| Dominican Republic | NORCECA | Challenger team | 3 | 2018 | 2021 | 6th place (2021) |
| Germany | CEV | Core team | 3 | 2018 | 2021 | 10th place (2019, 2021) |
| Italy | CEV | Core team | 3 | 2018 | 2021 | 5th place (2018) |
| Japan | AVC | Core team | 3 | 2018 | 2021 | 4th place (2021) |
| Netherlands | CEV | Core team | 3 | 2018 | 2021 | 5th place (2018) |
| Poland | CEV | Challenger team | 3 | 2018 | 2021 | 5th place (2019) |
| ~~Russia~~ | ~~CEV~~ | ~~Core team~~ | ~~3~~ | ~~2018~~ | ~~2021~~ | ~~8th place (2018, 2021)~~ |
| Serbia | CEV | Core team | 3 | 2018 | 2021 | 5th place (2018) |
| South Korea | AVC | Core team | 3 | 2018 | 2021 | 12th place (2018) |
| Thailand | AVC | Core team | 3 | 2018 | 2021 | 12th place (2019) |
| Turkey | CEV | Core team | 3 | 2018 | 2021 | Runners-up (2018) |
| United States | NORCECA | Core team | 3 | 2018 | 2021 | Champions (2018, 2019, 2021) |

== Format ==
=== Preliminary round ===
In the 2022 tournament, the format of play was changed. The new format will see 16 women's teams competing in pools of 8 teams during the pool phase. Each team plays 12 matches during the pool stage. Eight teams will then move into the final knockout phase of the competition.

=== Final round ===
The VNL Finals will see the seven strongest teams along with the finals host country Turkey moving directly to the knockout phase as first placed team, and which will consist of eight matches in total: four quarterfinals, two semi-finals and the bronze and gold medal matches.

Final 8 direct elimination formula:

1. The 1st ranked team will play a quarterfinal match against the 8th ranked team, the 2nd ranked team will play a quarterfinal match against the 7th ranked team, the 3rd ranked team will play a quarterfinal match against the 6th ranked team, the 4th ranked team will play a quarterfinal match against the 5th ranked team.
2. The Host Team is placed in 1st position if the team is among the top 8 teams in the Final Standings after the VNL Preliminary Phase.
3. The Host Team is placed in 8th position if the team is not among the top 8 teams in the Final Standings after the VNL Preliminary Phase.

== Rule changes ==
1. Court switch at the end of the sets was eliminated due to COVID-19 safety guidelines and for a better television broadcasts.
2. Each team is allowed to call only one time-out during each set in preliminary. The time-out lasts 30 seconds long.
3. Only one technical time-out is made when the leading team reaches 12 points.
4. Two time-outs per set are given to all matches in the Finals, one of them can only be called before technical time-out.
5. Live interview is introduced into matches during Set 2 and Set 3 in the Finals. Therefore, the breaks between Set 2 and Set 3 will extend to 5 minutes.

== Pool composition ==
The overview of pools was released on 7 December 2021.

| Week 1 | | Week 2 | | Week 3 | |
| Pool 1 United States | Pool 2 Turkey | Pool 3 Brazil | Pool 4 Philippines | Pool 5 Canada | Pool 6 Bulgaria |
|---|---|---|---|---|---|
| United States; Brazil; Canada; Dominican Republic; Germany; Japan; Poland; South Korea | Turkey; Belgium; Bulgaria; China; Italy; Netherlands; Serbia; Thailand | Brazil; Dominican Republic; Germany; Italy; Netherlands; Serbia; South Korea; Turkey | Belgium; Bulgaria; Canada; China; Japan; Poland; Thailand; United States | Canada; Belgium; Germany; Japan; Netherlands; Serbia; Turkey; United States | Bulgaria; Brazil; China; Dominican Republic; Italy; Poland; South Korea; Thailand |

== Venues ==
=== Preliminary round ===
Week 1
| Pool 1 | Pool 2 |
| Bossier City, United States | Ankara, Turkey |
|---|---|
| Bossier City Arena | Ankara Arena |
| Capacity: 14,000 | Capacity: 10,400 |
Week 2
| Pool 3 | Pool 4 |
| Brasília, Brazil | Quezon City, Philippines |
| Nilson Nelson Gymnasium | Araneta Coliseum |
| Capacity: 11,105 | Capacity: 16,035 |
Week 3
| Pool 5 | Pool 6 |
| Calgary, Canada | Sofia, Bulgaria |
| 7 Chiefs Sportsplex | Armeets Arena |
| Capacity: 5,000 | Capacity: 15,373 |

=== Final round ===
All matches
Ankara, Turkey
Ankara Arena
Capacity: 10,400
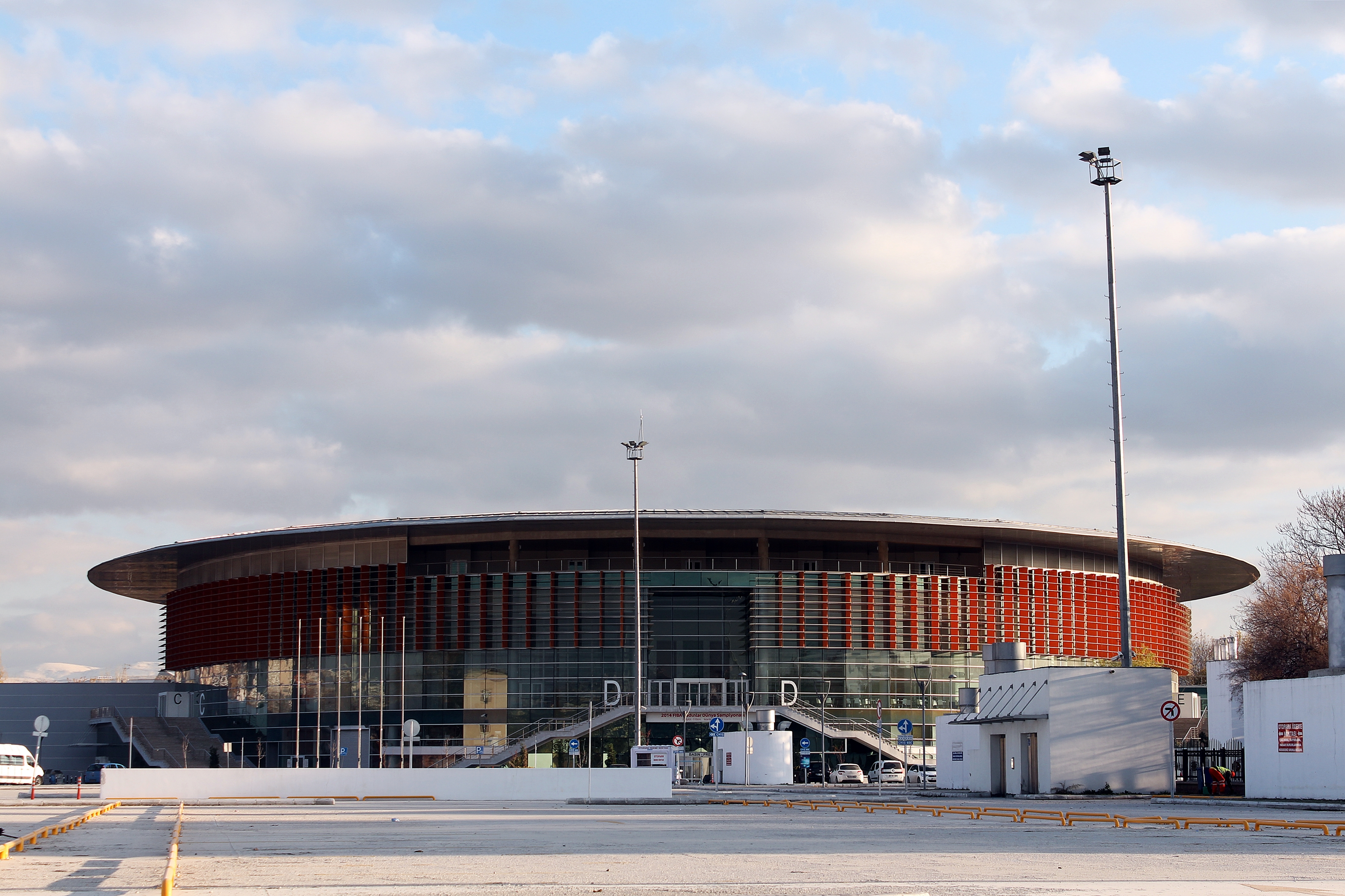

== Competition schedule ==
| ● | Preliminary round | ● | Final round |

| Week 1 31 May–5 Jun | Week 2 14–19 Jun | Week 3 28 Jun–3 Jul | Week 4 13–17 Jul |
|---|---|---|---|
| 32 matches | 32 matches | 32 matches | 8 matches |

== Pool standing procedure ==
1. Total number of victories (matches won, matches lost)
2. In the event of a tie, the following first tiebreaker will apply: The teams will be ranked by the most points gained per match as follows:
  - Match won 3–0 or 3–1: 3 points for the winner, 0 points for the loser
  - Match won 3–2: 2 points for the winner, 1 point for the loser
  - Match forfeited: 3 points for the winner, 0 points (0–25, 0–25, 0–25) for the loser
3. If teams are still tied after examining the number of victories and points gained, then the FIVB will examine the results in order to break the tie in the following order:
  - Sets quotient: if two or more teams are tied on the number of points gained, they will be ranked by the quotient resulting from the division of the number of all sets won by the number of all sets lost.
  - Points quotient: if the tie persists based on the sets quotient, the teams will be ranked by the quotient resulting from the division of all points scored by the total of points lost during all sets.
  - If the tie persists based on the points quotient, the tie will be broken based on the team that won the match of the Round Robin Phase between the tied teams. When the tie in points quotient is between three or more teams, these teams ranked taking into consideration only the matches involving the teams in question.

== Preliminary round ==
=== Ranking ===
| Pos | Team | Pld | W | L | Pts | SW | SL | SR | SPW | SPL | SPR | Qualification or relegation |
|---|---|---|---|---|---|---|---|---|---|---|---|---|
| 1 | United States | 12 | 11 | 1 | 32 | 33 | 7 | 4.714 | 961 | 810 | 1.186 | Final round |
| 2 | Brazil | 12 | 10 | 2 | 29 | 31 | 12 | 2.583 | 997 | 898 | 1.110 | Final round |
| 3 | Italy | 12 | 10 | 2 | 29 | 31 | 13 | 2.385 | 1021 | 888 | 1.150 | Final round |
| 4 | China | 12 | 8 | 4 | 26 | 29 | 17 | 1.706 | 1046 | 923 | 1.133 | Final round |
| 5 | Japan | 12 | 8 | 4 | 25 | 30 | 16 | 1.875 | 1042 | 931 | 1.119 | Final round |
| 6 | Serbia | 12 | 8 | 4 | 23 | 27 | 20 | 1.350 | 1042 | 1044 | 0.998 | Final round |
| 7 | Turkey (Note: Qualified as hosts) | 12 | 7 | 5 | 23 | 28 | 18 | 1.556 | 1060 | 966 | 1.097 | Final round |
| 8 | Thailand | 12 | 5 | 7 | 15 | 22 | 25 | 0.880 | 994 | 1049 | 0.948 | Final round |
| 9 | Dominican Republic | 12 | 5 | 7 | 14 | 19 | 27 | 0.704 | 926 | 1039 | 0.891 | |
| 10 | Germany | 12 | 4 | 8 | 14 | 20 | 27 | 0.741 | 1045 | 1057 | 0.989 | |
| 11 | Netherlands | 12 | 4 | 8 | 14 | 20 | 28 | 0.714 | 1010 | 1047 | 0.965 | |
| 12 | Canada | 12 | 4 | 8 | 12 | 17 | 26 | 0.654 | 961 | 989 | 0.972 | |
| 13 | Poland | 12 | 4 | 8 | 12 | 18 | 29 | 0.621 | 1005 | 1049 | 0.958 | |
| 14 | Bulgaria | 12 | 4 | 8 | 12 | 14 | 27 | 0.519 | 867 | 914 | 0.949 | |
| 15 | Belgium | 12 | 4 | 8 | 8 | 18 | 32 | 0.563 | 1034 | 1130 | 0.915 | 2022 Challenger Cup |
| 16 | South Korea | 12 | 0 | 12 | 0 | 3 | 36 | 0.083 | 701 | 978 | 0.717 | |

Source: VNL 2022 standings

=== Week 1 ===
==== Pool 1 ====
- All times are Central Summer Time (UTC-05:00).

| Date | Time | | Score | | Set 1 | Set 2 | Set 3 | Set 4 | Set 5 | Total | Report |
|---|---|---|---|---|---|---|---|---|---|---|---|
| 31 May | 17:00 | Germany | 1–3 | Brazil | 27–29 | 25–23 | 25–27 | 21–25 | | 98–104 | P2 Report |
| 31 May | 20:00 | United States | 3–0 | Dominican Republic | 25–21 | 25–17 | 25–18 | | | 75–56 | P2 Report |
| 1 Jun | 17:00 | Poland | 3–1 | Canada | 20–25 | 25–22 | 25–23 | 25–20 | | 95–90 | P2 Report |
| 1 Jun | 20:00 | South Korea | 0–3 | Japan | 17–25 | 16–25 | 11–25 | | | 44–75 | P2 Report |
| 2 Jun | 14:00 | Brazil | 3–0 | Poland | 25–23 | 25–21 | 25–22 | | | 75–66 | P2 Report |
| 2 Jun | 17:00 | Germany | 2–3 | Japan | 27–25 | 25–23 | 20–25 | 22–25 | 12–15 | 106–113 | P2 Report |
| 2 Jun | 20:00 | Canada | 3–0 | Dominican Republic | 25–18 | 25–15 | 25–18 | | | 75–51 | P2 Report |
| 3 Jun | 14:00 | Germany | 3–0 | South Korea | 25–22 | 25–15 | 25–16 | | | 75–53 | P2 Report |
| 3 Jun | 17:00 | Dominican Republic | 1–3 | Brazil | 9–25 | 25–16 | 18–25 | 17–25 | | 69–91 | P2 Report |
| 3 Jun | 20:00 | United States | 3–0 | Canada | 25–14 | 25–22 | 25–19 | | | 75–55 | P2 Report |
| 4 Jun | 14:00 | South Korea | 0–3 | Poland | 9–25 | 23–25 | 11–25 | | | 43–75 | P2 Report |
| 4 Jun | 17:00 | Dominican Republic | 1–3 | Japan | 17–25 | 25–20 | 21–25 | 10–25 | | 73–95 | P2 Report |
| 4 Jun | 20:00 | United States | 3–0 | Brazil | 25–21 | 25–20 | 25–18 | | | 75–59 | P2 Report |
| 5 Jun | 12:00 | Poland | 3–2 | Germany | 27–25 | 25–22 | 14–25 | 23–25 | 15–7 | 104–104 | P2 Report |
| 5 Jun | 15:00 | Japan | 3–0 | United States | 25–22 | 25–20 | 25–20 | | | 75–62 | P2 Report |
| 5 Jun | 18:00 | South Korea | 0–3 | Canada | 21–25 | 13–25 | 16–25 | | | 50–75 | P2 Report |

==== Pool 2 ====
- All times are Further-eastern European Time (UTC+03:00).

| Date | Time | | Score | | Set 1 | Set 2 | Set 3 | Set 4 | Set 5 | Total | Report |
|---|---|---|---|---|---|---|---|---|---|---|---|
| 31 May | 15:30 | Thailand | 3–0 | Bulgaria | 25–20 | 25–22 | 25–20 | | | 75–62 | P2 Report |
| 31 May | 18:30 | Turkey | 3–0 | Italy | 25–20 | 25–19 | 25–19 | | | 75–58 | P2 Report |
| 1 Jun | 15:30 | Belgium | 1–3 | Serbia | 25–14 | 16–25 | 17–25 | 22–25 | | 80–89 | P2 Report |
| 1 Jun | 18:30 | China | 3–1 | Netherlands | 16–25 | 25–22 | 25–23 | 25–23 | | 91–93 | P2 Report |
| 2 Jun | 13:00 | Thailand | 3–2 | Serbia | 25–23 | 25–27 | 25–20 | 20–25 | 15–12 | 110–107 | P2 Report |
| 2 Jun | 16:00 | Bulgaria | 3–2 | Netherlands | 25–15 | 12–25 | 19–25 | 25–15 | 15–7 | 96–87 | P2 Report |
| 2 Jun | 19:00 | Belgium | 1–3 | Italy | 25–21 | 19–25 | 23–25 | 20–25 | | 87–96 | P2 Report |
| 3 Jun | 13:00 | Serbia | 3–0 | Bulgaria | 26–24 | 25–15 | 26–24 | | | 77–63 | P2 Report |
| 3 Jun | 16:00 | Netherlands | 0–3 | Italy | 19–25 | 15–25 | 15–25 | | | 49–75 | P2 Report |
| 3 Jun | 19:00 | Turkey | 1–3 | China | 16–25 | 25–20 | 16–25 | 22–25 | | 79–95 | P2 Report |
| 4 Jun | 13:00 | Thailand | 2–3 | Belgium | 22–25 | 25–18 | 25–23 | 21–25 | 13–15 | 106–106 | P2 Report |
| 4 Jun | 16:00 | China | 3–1 | Italy | 25–13 | 20–25 | 25–22 | 25–18 | | 95–78 | P2 Report |
| 4 Jun | 19:00 | Bulgaria | 0–3 | Turkey | 19–25 | 21–25 | 16–25 | | | 56–75 | P2 Report |
| 5 Jun | 13:00 | Serbia | 3–2 | Netherlands | 27–25 | 25–16 | 17–25 | 22–25 | 15–13 | 106–104 | P2 Report |
| 5 Jun | 16:00 | Thailand | 3–2 | China | 25–23 | 13–25 | 14–25 | 25–23 | 15–11 | 92–107 | P2 Report |
| 5 Jun | 19:00 | Turkey | 3–1 | Belgium | 15–25 | 25–21 | 25–21 | 25–15 | | 90–82 | P2 Report |

=== Week 2 ===
==== Pool 3 ====
- All times are Brasília time (UTC−03:00).

| Date | Time | | Score | | Set 1 | Set 2 | Set 3 | Set 4 | Set 5 | Total | Report |
|---|---|---|---|---|---|---|---|---|---|---|---|
| 14 Jun | 18:00 | Netherlands | 1–3 | Germany | 20–25 | 19–25 | 25–12 | 22–25 | | 86–87 | P2 Report |
| 14 Jun | 21:00 | Serbia | 1–3 | Italy | 25–21 | 14–25 | 15–25 | 20–25 | | 74–96 | P2 Report |
| 15 Jun | 18:00 | Dominican Republic | 3–0 | South Korea | 25–21 | 25–17 | 25–13 | | | 75–51 | P2 Report |
| 15 Jun | 21:00 | Brazil | 3–1 | Turkey | 19–25 | 25–23 | 25–23 | 25–23 | | 94–94 | P2 Report |
| 16 Jun | 15:00 | Serbia | 3–0 | South Korea | 40–38 | 25–22 | 25–22 | | | 90–82 | P2 Report |
| 16 Jun | 18:00 | Italy | 3–2 | Dominican Republic | 25–23 | 20–25 | 25–19 | 16–25 | 15–12 | 101–104 | P2 Report |
| 16 Jun | 21:00 | Netherlands | 0–3 | Brazil | 16–25 | 15–25 | 23–25 | | | 54–75 | P2 Report |
| 17 Jun | 15:00 | Germany | 0–3 | Italy | 19–25 | 22–25 | 25–27 | | | 66–77 | P2 Report |
| 17 Jun | 18:00 | Serbia | 3–2 | Turkey | 25–19 | 15–25 | 20–25 | 25–22 | 15–13 | 100–104 | P2 Report |
| 17 Jun | 21:00 | Netherlands | 2–3 | Dominican Republic | 25–23 | 20–25 | 21–25 | 25–15 | 7–15 | 98–103 | P2 Report |
| 18 Jun | 15:00 | Italy | 3–1 | Brazil | 25–17 | 25–15 | 14–25 | 25–14 | | 89–71 | P2 Report |
| 18 Jun | 18:00 | Germany | 0–3 | Turkey | 22–25 | 21–25 | 22–25 | | | 65–75 | P2 Report |
| 18 Jun | 21:00 | Netherlands | 3–0 | South Korea | 25–11 | 25–21 | 25–18 | | | 75–50 | P2 Report |
| 19 Jun | 10:00 | Brazil | 3–0 | Serbia | 25–21 | 25–9 | 25–21 | | | 75–51 | P2 Report |
| 19 Jun | 13:00 | Germany | 1–3 | Dominican Republic | 23–25 | 23–25 | 25–11 | 25–27 | | 96–88 | P2 Report |
| 19 Jun | 16:00 | Turkey | 3–1 | South Korea | 20–25 | 25–13 | 25–19 | 25–15 | | 95–72 | P2 Report |

==== Pool 4 ====
- All times are Philippine Standard Time (UTC+08:00).

| Date | Time | | Score | | Set 1 | Set 2 | Set 3 | Set 4 | Set 5 | Total | Report |
|---|---|---|---|---|---|---|---|---|---|---|---|
| 14 Jun | 15:00 | Canada | 0–3 | Thailand | 19–25 | 22–25 | 24–26 | | | 65–76 | P2 Report |
| 14 Jun | 19:00 | Japan | 3–0 | Poland | 25–21 | 25–21 | 25–21 | | | 75–63 | P2 Report |
| 15 Jun | 15:00 | Bulgaria | 0–3 | United States | 20–25 | 22–25 | 20–25 | | | 62–75 | P2 Report |
| 15 Jun | 19:00 | China | 3–0 | Belgium | 25–19 | 25–22 | 25–14 | | | 75–55 | P2 Report |
| 16 Jun | 11:00 | Poland | 3–2 | Thailand | 22–25 | 27–29 | 25–16 | 25–16 | 15–13 | 114–99 | P2 Report |
| 16 Jun | 15:00 | Canada | 3–1 | Belgium | 25–22 | 25–21 | 22–25 | 25–22 | | 97–90 | P2 Report |
| 16 Jun | 19:00 | Bulgaria | 0–3 | Japan | 20–25 | 16–25 | 23–25 | | | 59–75 | P2 Report |
| 17 Jun | 11:00 | Poland | 0–3 | United States | 12–25 | 21–25 | 16–25 | | | 49–75 | P2 Report |
| 17 Jun | 15:00 | China | 3–1 | Canada | 25–16 | 18–25 | 25–12 | 25–18 | | 93–71 | P2 Report |
| 17 Jun | 19:00 | Japan | 3–0 | Thailand | 25–22 | 25–16 | 25–14 | | | 75–52 | P2 Report |
| 18 Jun | 11:00 | Bulgaria | 3–0 | Canada | 26–24 | 25–22 | 25–21 | | | 76–67 | P2 Report |
| 18 Jun | 15:00 | Belgium | 3–2 | Poland | 25–20 | 15–25 | 25–22 | 22–25 | 15–13 | 102–105 | P2 Report |
| 18 Jun | 19:00 | United States | 3–0 | China | 25–21 | 25–23 | 25–21 | | | 75–65 | P2 Report |
| 19 Jun | 11:00 | Bulgaria | 2–3 | Belgium | 22–25 | 23–25 | 25–20 | 25–20 | 15–17 | 110–107 | P2 Report |
| 19 Jun | 15:00 | Thailand | 1–3 | United States | 25–17 | 13–25 | 23–25 | 18–25 | | 79–92 | P2 Report |
| 19 Jun | 19:00 | Japan | 3–1 | China | 19–25 | 25–16 | 25–23 | 25–12 | | 94–76 | P2 Report |

=== Week 3 ===
==== Pool 5 ====
- All times are Central Summer Time (UTC-06:00).

| Date | Time | | Score | | Set 1 | Set 2 | Set 3 | Set 4 | Set 5 | Total | Report |
|---|---|---|---|---|---|---|---|---|---|---|---|
| 28 Jun | 17:00 | Serbia | 3–1 | Germany | 17–25 | 25–16 | 25–21 | 25–18 | | 92–80 | P2 Report |
| 28 Jun | 20:00 | Canada | 3–1 | Turkey | 25–22 | 21–25 | 25–22 | 25–23 | | 96–92 | P2 Report |
| 29 Jun | 17:00 | Japan | 2–3 | Netherlands | 25–23 | 20–25 | 26–24 | 21–25 | 10–15 | 102–112 | P2 Report |
| 29 Jun | 20:00 | Belgium | 0–3 | United States | 16–25 | 21–25 | 19–25 | | | 56–75 | P2 Report |
| 30 Jun | 14:00 | Turkey | 3–0 | Netherlands | 25–23 | 25–11 | 25–21 | | | 75–55 | P2 Report |
| 30 Jun | 17:00 | Germany | 3–1 | Belgium | 20–25 | 25–18 | 25–22 | 25–20 | | 95–85 | P2 Report |
| 30 Jun | 20:00 | United States | 3–0 | Serbia | 25–17 | 33–31 | 25–16 | | | 83–64 | P2 Report |
| 1 Jul | 14:00 | Belgium | 1–3 | Netherlands | 25–21 | 24–26 | 20–25 | 21–25 | | 90–97 | P2 Report |
| 1 Jul | 17:00 | Turkey | 3–1 | Japan | 25–20 | 25–15 | 18–25 | 25–22 | | 93–82 | P2 Report |
| 1 Jul | 20:00 | Serbia | 3–1 | Canada | 25–20 | 25–14 | 20–25 | 25–22 | | 95–81 | P2 Report |
| 2 Jul | 14:00 | Turkey | 2–3 | United States | 22–25 | 25–18 | 25–27 | 25–23 | 16–18 | 113–111 | P2 Report |
| 2 Jul | 17:00 | Japan | 1–3 | Serbia | 25–22 | 20–25 | 19–25 | 22–25 | | 86–97 | P2 Report |
| 2 Jul | 20:00 | Germany | 3–1 | Canada | 25–19 | 19–25 | 27–25 | 25–23 | | 96–92 | P2 Report |
| 3 Jul | 11:00 | Belgium | 3–2 | Japan | 25–16 | 18–25 | 25–19 | 11–25 | 15–10 | 94–95 | P2 Report |
| 3 Jul | 14:00 | United States | 3–1 | Germany | 25–17 | 25–13 | 13–25 | 25–22 | | 88–77 | P2 Report |
| 3 Jul | 17:00 | Netherlands | 3–1 | Canada | 22–25 | 27–25 | 26–24 | 25–23 | | 100–97 | P2 Report |

==== Pool 6 ====
- All times are Eastern European Summer Time (UTC+03:00).

| Date | Time | | Score | | Set 1 | Set 2 | Set 3 | Set 4 | Set 5 | Total | Report |
|---|---|---|---|---|---|---|---|---|---|---|---|
| 28 Jun | 17:00 | China | 2–3 | Brazil | 20–25 | 23–25 | 25–18 | 25–21 | 11–15 | 104–104 | P2 Report |
| 28 Jun | 20:00 | Dominican Republic | 0–3 | Bulgaria | 15–25 | 13–25 | 21–25 | | | 49–75 | P2 Report |
| 29 Jun | 17:00 | Thailand | 3–0 | South Korea | 25–11 | 25–22 | 25–17 | | | 75–50 | P2 Report |
| 29 Jun | 20:00 | Italy | 3–1 | Poland | 25–27 | 25–20 | 28–26 | 25–18 | | 103–91 | P2 Report |
| 30 Jun | 13:30 | Thailand | 1–3 | Dominican Republic | 25–22 | 23–25 | 23–25 | 21–25 | | 92–97 | P2 Report |
| 30 Jun | 16:30 | Poland | 0–3 | China | 8–25 | 23–25 | 20–25 | | | 51–75 | P2 Report |
| 30 Jun | 20:00 | South Korea | 0–3 | Brazil | 17–25 | 19–25 | 13–25 | | | 49–75 | P2 Report |
| 1 Jul | 13:30 | China | 3–0 | Dominican Republic | 25–19 | 25–16 | 25–15 | | | 75–50 | P2 Report |
| 1 Jul | 16:30 | Italy | 3–1 | South Korea | 25–17 | 23–25 | 25–15 | 25–19 | | 98–76 | P2 Report |
| 1 Jul | 20:00 | Brazil | 3–0 | Bulgaria | 25–21 | 25–20 | 25–18 | | | 75–59 | P2 Report |
| 2 Jul | 13:30 | Dominican Republic | 3–2 | Poland | 20–25 | 38–36 | 25–20 | 13–25 | 15–9 | 111–115 | P2 Report |
| 2 Jul | 16:30 | Brazil | 3–1 | Thailand | 25–18 | 26–24 | 23–25 | 25–23 | | 99–90 | P2 Report |
| 2 Jul | 20:00 | Italy | 3–0 | Bulgaria | 25–12 | 25–19 | 25–21 | | | 75–52 | P2 Report |
| 3 Jul | 13:30 | China | 3–1 | South Korea | 25–13 | 19–25 | 25–19 | 26–24 | | 95–81 | P2 Report |
| 3 Jul | 16:30 | Thailand | 0–3 | Italy | 20–25 | 14–25 | 14–25 | | | 48–75 | P2 Report |
| 3 Jul | 20:00 | Poland | 1–3 | Bulgaria | 25–22 | 13–25 | 17–25 | 22–25 | | 77–97 | P2 Report |

== Final round ==
- All times are Further-eastern European Time (UTC+03:00).

Quarter-finals
14 July
Turkey | 3
Thailand | 1
14 July
Italy | 3
China | 1
13 July
United States | 2
Serbia | 3
13 July
Brazil | 3
Japan | 1

Semi-finals
16 July
Turkey | 0
Italy | 3
16 July
Serbia | 1
Brazil | 3

Final
17 July
Italy | 3
Brazil | 0
Third place match
17 July
Turkey | 0
Serbia | 3

=== Quarter-finals ===
| Date | Time | | Score | | Set 1 | Set 2 | Set 3 | Set 4 | Set 5 | Total | Report |
|---|---|---|---|---|---|---|---|---|---|---|---|
| 13 Jul | 15:00 | Brazil | 3–1 | Japan | 29–27 | 28–26 | 20–25 | 25–14 | | 102–92 | P2 Report |
| 13 Jul | 18:30 | United States | 2–3 | Serbia | 27–29 | 23–25 | 25–20 | 25–20 | 13–15 | 113–109 | P2 Report |
| 14 Jul | 15:00 | Italy | 3–1 | China | 25–22 | 25–19 | 24–26 | 25–22 | | 99–89 | P2 Report |
| 14 Jul | 18:30 | Turkey | 3–1 | Thailand | 23–25 | 25–15 | 25–18 | 25–21 | | 98–79 | P2 Report |

=== Semi-finals ===
| Date | Time | | Score | | Set 1 | Set 2 | Set 3 | Set 4 | Set 5 | Total | Report |
|---|---|---|---|---|---|---|---|---|---|---|---|
| 16 Jul | 15:00 | Serbia | 1–3 | Brazil | 25–14 | 18–25 | 24–26 | 19–25 | | 86–90 | P2 Report |
| 16 Jul | 18:30 | Turkey | 0–3 | Italy | 18–25 | 26–28 | 22–25 | | | 66–78 | P2 Report |

=== Third place match ===
| Date | Time | | Score | | Set 1 | Set 2 | Set 3 | Set 4 | Set 5 | Total | Report |
|---|---|---|---|---|---|---|---|---|---|---|---|
| 17 Jul | 15:00 | Turkey | 0–3 | Serbia | 25–27 | 17–25 | 24–26 | | | 66–78 | P2 Report |

=== Final ===
| Date | Time | | Score | | Set 1 | Set 2 | Set 3 | Set 4 | Set 5 | Total | Report |
|---|---|---|---|---|---|---|---|---|---|---|---|
| 17 Jul | 18:30 | Italy | 3–0 | Brazil | 25–23 | 25–22 | 25–22 | | | 75–67 | P2 Report |

== Final standing ==
| Rank | Team |
|---|---|
| 1st place, gold medalist(s) | Italy |
| 2nd place, silver medalist(s) | Brazil |
| 3rd place, bronze medalist(s) | Serbia |
| 4 | Turkey |
| 5 | United States |
| 6 | China |
| 7 | Japan |
| 8 | Thailand |
| 9 | Dominican Republic |
| 10 | Germany |
| 11 | Netherlands |
| 12 | Canada |
| 13 | Poland |
| 14 | Bulgaria |
| 15 | Belgium |
| 16 | South Korea |

Source: VNL 2022 final standings

2022 Women's VNL champions

Italy
First title

14–woman roster
Marina Lubian, Alessia Gennari, Sara Bonifacio, Ofelia Malinov, Monica De Gennaro, Eleonora Fersino, Alessia Orro, Caterina Bosetti, Cristina Chirichella, Anna Danesi, Elena Pietrini, Sylvia Nwakalor, Miriam Sylla (c), Paola Egonu
Head coach
Davide Mazzanti

== Awards ==
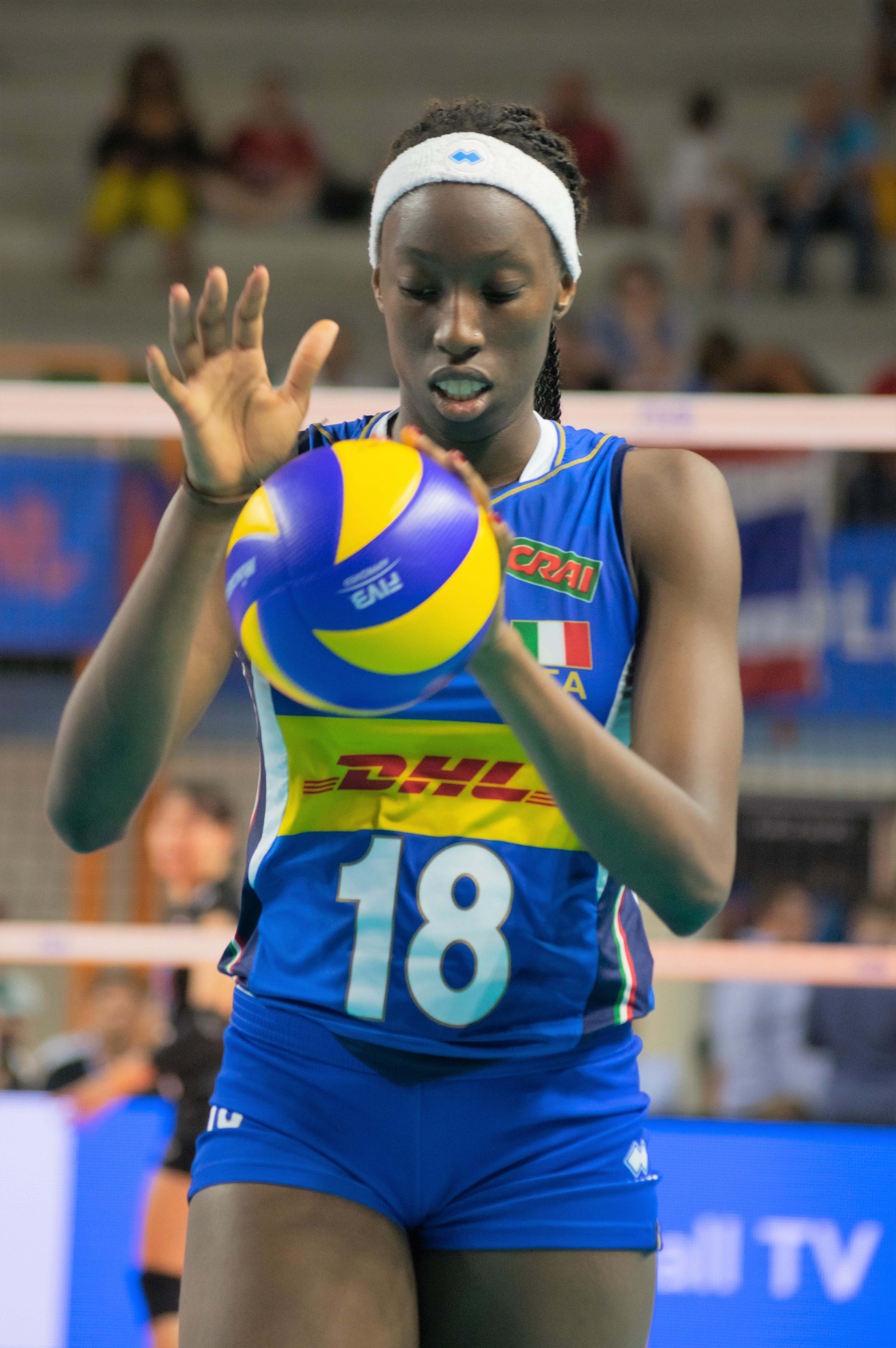
Paola Egonu was the 2022 FIVB Nations League Most Valuable Player

- Most valuable player
  Paola Egonu (ITA)
- Best setter
  Alessia Orro (ITA)
- Best outside spikers
  Caterina Bosetti (ITA)
  Gabriela Guimarães (BRA)
- Best middle blockers
  Jovana Stevanović (SRB)
  Ana Carolina da Silva (BRA)
- Best opposite spiker
  Paola Egonu (ITA)
- Best libero
  Monica De Gennaro (ITA)

== Statistics leaders ==
=== Preliminary round ===
Statistics leaders correct as of Week 3 of preliminary round.

Best Scorers (Note: (Best scorers determined by scored points from spike, block and serve).)
| | Player | Attacks | Blocks | Serves | Total |
|---|---|---|---|---|---|
| 1 | (Belgium) Britt Herbots | 282 | 15 | 9 | 306 |
| 2 | (Japan) Sarina Koga | 222 | 17 | 4 | 243 |
| 3 | (China) Li Yingying | 203 | 16 | 13 | 232 |
| 4 | (Thailand) Pimpichaya Kokram | 196 | 11 | 11 | 218 |
| 5 | (Canada) Kiera Van Ryk | 182 | 11 | 20 | 213 |

Best Attackers (Note: (Best attackers determined by successful spikes).)
| | Player | Spikes | Faults | Shots | % | Total |
|---|---|---|---|---|---|---|
| 1 | (Belgium) Britt Herbots | 282 | 83 | 400 | 36.86 | 765 |
| 2 | (Japan) Sarina Koga | 222 | 49 | 258 | 41.97 | 529 |
| 3 | (China) Li Yingying | 203 | 58 | 162 | 47.99 | 423 |
| 4 | (Thailand) Pimpichaya Kokram | 196 | 61 | 191 | 43.75 | 448 |
| 5 | (Canada) Kiera Van Ryk | 182 | 94 | 160 | 41.74 | 436 |

Best Blockers (Note: (Best blockers determined by the stuff blocks, faults and rebounds).)
| | Player | Blocks | Faults | Rebounds | Avg | Total |
|---|---|---|---|---|---|---|
| 1 | (Brazil) Ana Carolina da Silva | 52 | 56 | 50 | 4.33 | 158 |
| 2 | (Turkey) Zehra Güneş | 43 | 63 | 65 | 3.58 | 117 |
| 3 | (Serbia) Maja Aleksić | 40 | 53 | 71 | 3.33 | 164 |
| 4 | (Netherlands) Eline Timmerman | 36 | 79 | 57 | 3.00 | 172 |
| 5 | (Belgium) Marlies Janssens | 32 | 29 | 36 | 2.67 | 97 |

Best Servers (Note: (Best servers determined by aces, faults and hits).)
| | Player | Aces | Faults | Hits | Avg | Total |
|---|---|---|---|---|---|---|
| 1 | (Canada) Kiera Van Ryk | 20 | 50 | 78 | 1.67 | 148 |
| 2 | (China) Li Yingying | 13 | 20 | 134 | 1.08 | 167 |
| 3 | (Brazil) Ana Carolina da Silva | 12 | 12 | 143 | 1.00 | 167 |
| 4 | (Germany) Lina Alsmeier | 11 | 23 | 90 | 1.00 | 124 |
| 5 | (Thailand) Pimpichaya Kokram | 11 | 11 | 156 | 0.92 | 178 |

Best Setters (Note: (Best setters determined by running setts, faults and still sets).)
| | Player | Running | Faults | Still | Avg | Total |
|---|---|---|---|---|---|---|
| 1 | (Thailand) Pornpun Guedpard | 475 | 9 | 694 | 39.58 | 1178 |
| 2 | (Poland) Joanna Wolosz | 305 | 7 | 550 | 25.42 | 862 |
| 3 | (Dominican Republic) Niverka Marte | 298 | 7 | 730 | 24.83 | 1035 |
| 4 | (Netherlands) Britt Bongaerts | 262 | 7 | 1009 | 21.83 | 1278 |
| 5 | (South Korea) Yeum Hye-seon | 252 | 12 | 746 | 21.00 | 1010 |

Best Diggers (Note: (Best diggers determined by successful digs, faults and receptions).)
| | Player | Digs | Faults | Receptions | Avg | Total |
|---|---|---|---|---|---|---|
| 1 | (Poland) Maria Stenzel | 176 | 27 | 17 | 14.67 | 220 |
| 2 | (Japan) Manami Kojima | 176 | 36 | 9 | 14.67 | 221 |
| 3 | (Netherlands) Myrthe Schoot | 161 | 55 | 35 | 13.42 | 251 |
| 4 | (Serbia) Teodora Pušić | 146 | 33 | 20 | 12.17 | 199 |
| 5 | (Germany) Anna Pogany | 144 | 47 | 7 | 12.00 | 198 |

Best Receivers (Note: (Best receivers determined by efficient receptions, faults and serve receptions).)
| | Player | Excellents | Faults | Serve | % | Total |
|---|---|---|---|---|---|---|
| 1 | (Germany) Anna Pogany | 162 | 11 | 104 | 58.48 | 277 |
| 2 | (Poland) Maria Stenzel | 132 | 11 | 162 | 43.28 | 305 |
| 3 | (Canada) Alexa Gray | 129 | 16 | 201 | 37.28 | 346 |
| 4 | (Netherlands) Anne Buijs | 129 | 8 | 117 | 50.79 | 254 |
| 5 | (Japan) Manami Kojima | 113 | 5 | 103 | 51.13 | 221 |

=== Final round ===
Statistics leaders correct as of final round.

Best Scorers
| | Player | Attacks | Blocks | Serves | Total |
|---|---|---|---|---|---|
| 1 | (Italy) Paola Egonu | 72 | 6 | 5 | 83 |
| 2 | (Brazil) Kisy Nascimento | 45 | 6 | 2 | 53 |
| 3 | (Serbia) Sara Lozo | 43 | 5 | 3 | 51 |
| 4 | (Serbia) Ana Bjelica | 43 | 5 | 1 | 49 |
| 5 | (Brazil) Gabriela Guimarães | 46 | 2 | 1 | 49 |

Best Attackers
| | Player | Spikes | Faults | Shots | % | Total |
|---|---|---|---|---|---|---|
| 1 | (Italy) Paola Egonu | 72 | 23 | 58 | 47.06 | 153 |
| 2 | (Brazil) Gabriela Guimarães | 46 | 17 | 40 | 44.66 | 103 |
| 3 | (Brazil) Kisy Nascimento | 45 | 13 | 43 | 44.55 | 101 |
| 4 | (Serbia) Ana Bjelica | 43 | 21 | 55 | 36.13 | 119 |
| 5 | (Serbia) Sara Lozo | 43 | 14 | 32 | 48.31 | 89 |

Best Blockers
| | Player | Blocks | Faults | Rebounds | Avg | Total |
|---|---|---|---|---|---|---|
| 1 | (Brazil) Ana Carolina da Silva | 11 | 22 | 27 | 3.67 | 60 |
| 2 | (Serbia) Jovana Stevanović | 9 | 27 | 17 | 3.00 | 53 |
| 3 | (Italy) Anna Danesi | 9 | 16 | 10 | 3.00 | 35 |
| 4 | (Turkey) Zehra Güneş | 8 | 11 | 29 | 2.67 | 48 |
| 5 | (Serbia) Maja Aleksić | 7 | 19 | 21 | 2.33 | 47 |

Best Servers
| | Player | Aces | Faults | Hits | Avg | Total |
|---|---|---|---|---|---|---|
| 1 | (Turkey) Eda Erdem | 5 | 3 | 28 | 1.67 | 36 |
| 2 | (Italy) Paola Egonu | 5 | 6 | 30 | 1.67 | 41 |
| 3 | (Serbia) Jovana Stevanović | 4 | 3 | 32 | 1.33 | 39 |
| 4 | (Italy) Caterina Bosetti | 4 | 6 | 27 | 1.33 | 37 |
| 5 | (Serbia) Sara Lozo | 3 | 6 | 37 | 1.00 | 46 |

Best Setters
| | Player | Running | Faults | Still | Avg | Total |
|---|---|---|---|---|---|---|
| 1 | (Brazil) Macris Carneiro | 68 | 3 | 192 | 22.67 | 263 |
| 2 | (Italy) Alessia Orro | 51 | 1 | 207 | 17.00 | 259 |
| 3 | (Turkey) Cansu Özbay | 48 | 2 | 174 | 16.00 | 224 |
| 4 | (Serbia) Bojana Drča | 46 | 6 | 241 | 15.33 | 293 |
| 5 | (Japan) Tamaki Matsui | 32 | 1 | 55 | 32.00 | 88 |

Best Diggers
| | Player | Digs | Faults | Receptions | Avg | Total |
|---|---|---|---|---|---|---|
| 1 | (Italy) Monica De Gennaro | 37 | 9 | 8 | 12.33 | 54 |
| 2 | (Serbia) Teodora Pušić | 34 | 14 | 3 | 11.33 | 51 |
| 3 | (Turkey) Simge Aköz | 30 | 11 | 3 | 10.00 | 44 |
| 4 | (Brazil) Gabriela Guimarães | 28 | 10 | 6 | 9.33 | 44 |
| 5 | (Italy) Caterina Bosetti | 26 | 7 | 2 | 8.67 | 35 |

Best Receivers
| | Player | Excellents | Faults | Serve | % | Total |
|---|---|---|---|---|---|---|
| 1 | (Italy) Caterina Bosetti | 36 | 3 | 33 | 50.00 | 72 |
| 2 | (Serbia) Teodora Pušić | 33 | 2 | 46 | 40.74 | 81 |
| 3 | (Brazil) Júlia Bergmann | 31 | 5 | 52 | 35.23 | 88 |
| 4 | (Italy) Elena Pietrini | 31 | 1 | 43 | 41.33 | 75 |
| 5 | (Turkey) Hande Baladin | 30 | 2 | 41 | 41.10 | 73 |

== See also ==
- 2022 FIVB Volleyball Women's Challenger Cup
- 2022 FIVB Women's Volleyball World Championship
