= Eleonora Fersino =

Italian volleyball player (born 2000)

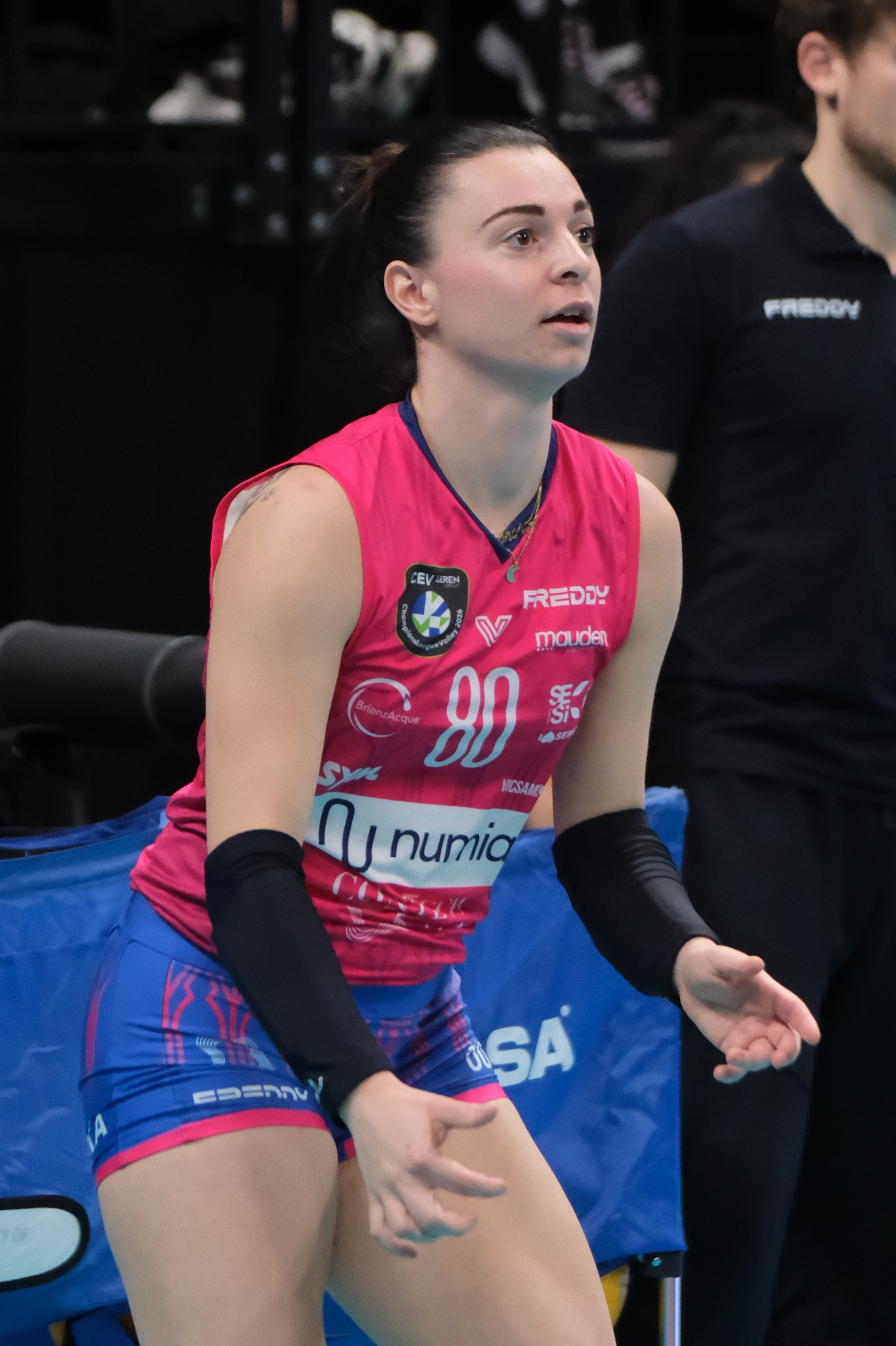
- Fersino playing for Vero Volley Milano in 2026

Personal information
- Born: 24 January 2000 (age 26); Chioggia, Veneto, Italy
- Height: 1.69 m (5 ft 7 in)

Volleyball information
- Position: Libero
- Current club: Vero Volley Milano
- Number: 80

Career
Years	Teams
2016–2018	Pool Piave (it)
2018–2020	Imoco
2020–2021	Bergamo
2021–2025	AGIL
2025–	Vero Volley Milano

National team
2021–	Italy
Honours
Women's volleyball
Representing Italy
FIVB World Championship
Gold medal – first place	2025 Thailand	Team
Bronze medal – third place	2022 Netherlands/Poland	Team
FIVB Nations League
Gold medal – first place	2022 Ankara	Team
Gold medal – first place	2025 Łódź	Team
Bronze medal – third place	2026 Macau	Team
European Championship
Silver medal – second place	2026 Azerbaijan-Czechia-Sweden-Turkey	Team

Eleonora Fersino (born 24 January 2000) is an Italian volleyball player who plays as a libero for Vero Volley Milano and the Italy national team.

== Career ==
=== Clubs ===
Raised with Volley Clodia, her hometown team, Fersino played for Pool Piave in Noventa di Piave from the ages of fourteen to eighteen, during which time she switched positions from spiker to libero.

In June 2018, Imoco, a club of which Pool Piave is a subsidiary, announced Fersino had been signed to their Serie A1 squad for the 2018–2019 season. During her time in Conegliano, she won the Coppa Italia twice, the Scudetto, the 2019 Club World Championship, and the 2019-2020 Coppa Italia.

For the 2020–2021 season, Fersino moved to Bergamo, while in the following one she joined AGIL, with whom she won the 2023–24 Challenge Cup and the 2024–25 CEV Cup. She changed jersey for the 2025–26 season, wearing that of Pro Victoria, still in Serie A1.

=== National team ===
In 2021, Fersino received her first call-ups to the senior national team. In 2022, she won the gold medal at the Volleyball Nations League and the bronze medal at the World Championship, while in 2025, she won the gold medal again at the Volleyball Nations League, in addition to the gold medal at the World Championship. She has over 100 appearances with the Italian team.

== Honours ==
=== Club ===
- Serie A1

2018–19

- Coppa Italia

2019–20

- Supercoppa Italiana

2018, 2019

- Club World Championship

2019

- CEV Cup

2024–25

- Challenge Cup

2023–24
