= 2019 FIVB Volleyball Women's Club World Championship =

2019 Women's Club World Championship

Tournament details
- Host country: China
- City: Shaoxing
- Dates: 3–8 December
- Teams: 8 (from 3 confederations)
- Venue: 1 (in 1 host city)

Final positions
- Champions: (Italy) Imoco Volley Conegliano (1st title)
- Runners-up: (Turkey) Eczacıbaşı VitrA İstanbul
- Third place: (Turkey) VakıfBank İstanbul
- Fourth place: (Italy) Igor Gorgonzola Novara

Tournament awards
- MVP: (Italy) Paola Egonu
- Best Setter: (Poland) Joanna Wołosz
- Best OH: (South Korea) Kim Yeon-koung (United States) Kimberly Hill
- Best MB: (Turkey) Zehra Güneş (Netherlands) Robin de Kruijf
- Best OPP: (Sweden) Isabelle Haak
- Best Libero: (Turkey) Simge Şebnem Aköz

Tournament statistics
- Matches played: 20

The 2019 FIVB Women's Club World Championship was the 13th edition of the tournament. For the second straight time it was held in Shaoxing, China from 3 to 8 December. Eight teams competed in the tournament, including four wild cards.

== Qualification ==
Team	Qualified as
(China) Guangdong Evergrande VC	Hosts
(China) Tianjin Bohai Bank VC	2019 Asian Champions
(Italy) Igor Gorgonzola Novara	2018–19 European Champions
(Brazil) Itambé Minas	2019 South American Champions
(Turkey) Eczacıbaşı VitrA İstanbul	Wild Card
(Italy) Imoco Volley Conegliano	Wild Card
(Turkey) VakıfBank İstanbul	Wild Card
(Brazil) Dentil Praia Clube	Wild Card

== Pools composition ==
Pool A	Pool B
(Turkey) Eczacıbaşı VitrA İstanbul	(Brazil) Dentil Praia Clube
(China) Guangdong Evergrande VC	(Italy) Igor Gorgonzola Novara
(Italy) Imoco Volley Conegliano	(China) Tianjin Bohai Bank VC
(Brazil) Itambé Minas	(Turkey) VakıfBank İstanbul

== Venue ==
All rounds
Shaoxing, China
Shaoxing Olympic Sports Center

== Pool standing procedure ==
1. Number of matches won
2. Match points
3. Sets ratio
4. Points ratio
5. If the tie continues as per the point ratio between two teams, the priority will be given to the team which won the last match between them. When the tie in points ratio is between three or more teams, a new classification of these teams in the terms of points 1, 2 and 3 will be made taking into consideration only the matches in which they were opposed to each other.

Match won 3–0 or 3–1: 3 match points for the winner, 0 match points for the loser
Match won 3–2: 2 match points for the winner, 1 match point for the loser

== Preliminary round ==
- All times are China Standard Time (UTC+08:00).

=== Pool A ===
Pos	Team	Pld	W	L	Pts	SW	SL	SR	SPW	SPL	SPR	Qualification
1	(Italy) Imoco Volley Conegliano	3	3	0	8	9	3	3.000	292	259	1.127	Semifinals
2	(Turkey) Eczacıbaşı VitrA İstanbul	3	2	1	6	7	3	2.333	238	198	1.202	Semifinals
3	(China) Guangdong Evergrande VC	3	1	2	3	3	7	0.429	205	245	0.837	Classification 5th–8th
4	(Brazil) Itambé Minas	3	0	3	1	3	9	0.333	263	296	0.889	Classification 5th–8th

Date	Time		Score		Set 1	Set 2	Set 3	Set 4	Set 5	Total	Report
3 Dec	10:00	Imoco Volley Conegliano (Italy)	3–1	(Turkey) Eczacıbaşı VitrA İstanbul	25–20	25–22	22–25	25–21		97–88	P2
3 Dec	17:00	Guangdong Evergrande VC (China)	3–1	(Brazil) Itambé Minas	25–22	28–26	23–25	25–22		101–95	P2
4 Dec	17:00	Eczacıbaşı VitrA İstanbul (Turkey)	3–0	(Brazil) Itambé Minas	25–17	25–23	25–16			75–56	P2
4 Dec	20:00	Guangdong Evergrande VC (China)	0–3	(Italy) Imoco Volley Conegliano	16–25	22–25	21–25			59–75	P2
6 Dec	10:00	Imoco Volley Conegliano (Italy)	3–2	(Brazil) Itambé Minas	25–17	25–19	20–25	22–25	28–26	120–112	P2
6 Dec	17:00	Eczacıbaşı VitrA İstanbul (Turkey)	3–0	(China) Guangdong Evergrande VC	25–21	25–9	25–15			75–45	P2

=== Pool B ===
Pos	Team	Pld	W	L	Pts	SW	SL	SR	SPW	SPL	SPR	Qualification
1	(Italy) Igor Gorgonzola Novara	3	3	0	7	9	4	2.250	287	266	1.079	Semifinals
2	(Turkey) VakıfBank İstanbul	3	2	1	7	8	3	2.667	260	227	1.145	Semifinals
3	(China) Tianjin Bohai Bank VC	3	1	2	3	5	8	0.625	246	276	0.891	Classification 5th–8th
4	(Brazil) Dentil Praia Clube	3	0	3	1	2	9	0.222	233	257	0.907	Classification 5th–8th

Date	Time		Score		Set 1	Set 2	Set 3	Set 4	Set 5	Total	Report
3 Dec	14:00	VakıfBank İstanbul (Turkey)	3–0	(Brazil) Dentil Praia Clube	27–25	25–20	25–20			77–65	P2
3 Dec	20:00	Tianjin Bohai Bank VC (China)	2–3	(Italy) Igor Gorgonzola Novara	25–17	25–15	18–25	15–25	11–15	94–97	P2
5 Dec	17:00	Igor Gorgonzola Novara (Italy)	3–2	(Turkey) VakıfBank İstanbul	25–21	25–22	25–27	24–26	15–12	114–108	P2
5 Dec	20:00	Tianjin Bohai Bank VC (China)	3–2	(Brazil) Dentil Praia Clube	25–21	25–19	22–25	16–25	16–14	104–104	P2
6 Dec	14:00	Igor Gorgonzola Novara (Italy)	3–0	(Brazil) Dentil Praia Clube	25–21	26–24	25–19			76–64	P2
6 Dec	20:00	Tianjin Bohai Bank VC (China)	0–3	(Turkey) VakıfBank İstanbul	15–25	14–25	19–25			48–75	P2

== Classification round ==
- All times are China Standard Time (UTC+08:00).

Classification 5th–8th
7 December
(China) Guangdong	0
(Brazil) Praia Clube	3
7 December
(China) Tianjin	0
(Brazil) Minas	3

5th place match
8 December
(Brazil) Praia Clube	2
(Brazil) Minas	3
7th place match
8 December
(China) Guangdong	3
(China) Tianjin	0

=== Classification 5th–8th ===
Date	Time		Score		Set 1	Set 2	Set 3	Set 4	Set 5	Total	Report
7 Dec	10:00	Guangdong Evergrande VC (China)	0–3	(Brazil) Dentil Praia Clube	22–25	20–25	14–25			56–75	P2
7 Dec	14:00	Tianjin Bohai Bank VC (China)	0–3	(Brazil) Itambé Minas	23–25	26–28	19–25			68–78	P2

=== 7th place match ===
Date	Time		Score		Set 1	Set 2	Set 3	Set 4	Set 5	Total	Report
8 Dec	10:00	Guangdong Evergrande VC (China)	3–0	(China) Tianjin Bohai Bank VC	28–26	25–20	25–21			78–67	P2

=== 5th place match ===
Date	Time		Score		Set 1	Set 2	Set 3	Set 4	Set 5	Total	Report
8 Dec	14:00	Dentil Praia Clube (Brazil)	2–3	(Brazil) Itambé Minas	25–18	14–25	25–18	22–25	9–15	95–101	P2

== Final round ==
- All times are China Standard Time (UTC+08:00).

Semifinals
7 December
(Italy) Conegliano	3
(Turkey) VakıfBank	2
7 December
(Italy) Novara	2
(Turkey) Eczacıbaşı	3

Final
8 December
(Italy) Conegliano	3
(Turkey) Eczacıbaşı	1
3rd place match
8 December
(Turkey) VakıfBank	3
(Italy) Novara	0

=== Semifinals ===
Date	Time		Score		Set 1	Set 2	Set 3	Set 4	Set 5	Total	Report
7 Dec	17:00	Imoco Volley Conegliano (Italy)	3–2	(Turkey) VakıfBank İstanbul	25–23	20–25	25–23	21–25	23–21	114–117	P2
7 Dec	20:00	Igor Gorgonzola Novara (Italy)	2–3	(Turkey) Eczacıbaşı VitrA İstanbul	21–25	25–23	11–25	25–23	13–15	95–111	P2

=== 3rd place match ===
Date	Time		Score		Set 1	Set 2	Set 3	Set 4	Set 5	Total	Report
8 Dec	17:00	VakıfBank İstanbul (Turkey)	3–0	(Italy) Igor Gorgonzola Novara	26–24	25–23	25–21			76–68	P2

=== Final ===
Date	Time		Score		Set 1	Set 2	Set 3	Set 4	Set 5	Total	Report
8 Dec	20:00	Imoco Volley Conegliano (Italy)	3–1	(Turkey) Eczacıbaşı VitrA İstanbul	22–25	25–14	25–19	25–21		97–79	P2

== Final standing ==
Rank	Team
1st place, gold medalist(s)	(Italy) Imoco Volley Conegliano
2nd place, silver medalist(s)	(Turkey) Eczacıbaşı VitrA İstanbul
3rd place, bronze medalist(s)	(Turkey) VakıfBank İstanbul
4	(Italy) Igor Gorgonzola Novara
5	(Brazil) Itambé Minas
6	(Brazil) Dentil Praia Clube
7	(China) Guangdong Evergrande VC
8	(China) Tianjin Bohai Bank VC

2019 Women's Club World Champions

1st title

14–player roster
Indre Sorokaite, Robin de Kruijf, Jennifer Janiska, Raphaela Folie, Eleonora Fersino, Alexandra Botezat, Monica De Gennaro, Chiaka Ogbogu, Terry Enweonwu, Giulia Gennari, Joanna Wołosz (c), Kimberly Hill, Miriam Sylla, Paola Egonu
Head coach
Daniele Santarelli

== Awards ==
- Most valuable player
  (Italy) Paola Egonu (Imoco Volley Conegliano)
- Best Opposite
  (Sweden) Isabelle Haak (VakıfBank İstanbul)
- Best outside spikers
  (South Korea) Kim Yeon-koung (Eczacıbaşı VitrA İstanbul)
  (United States) Kimberly Hill (Imoco Volley Conegliano)
- Best middle blockers
  (Turkey) Zehra Güneş (VakıfBank İstanbul)
  (Netherlands) Robin de Kruijf (Imoco Volley Conegliano)
- Best setter
  (Poland) Joanna Wołosz (Imoco Volley Conegliano)
- Best libero
  (Turkey) Simge Şebnem Aköz (Eczacıbaşı VitrA İstanbul)

== See also ==
- 2019 FIVB Volleyball Men's Club World Championship
