= Monica De Gennaro =

Italian professional volleyball player

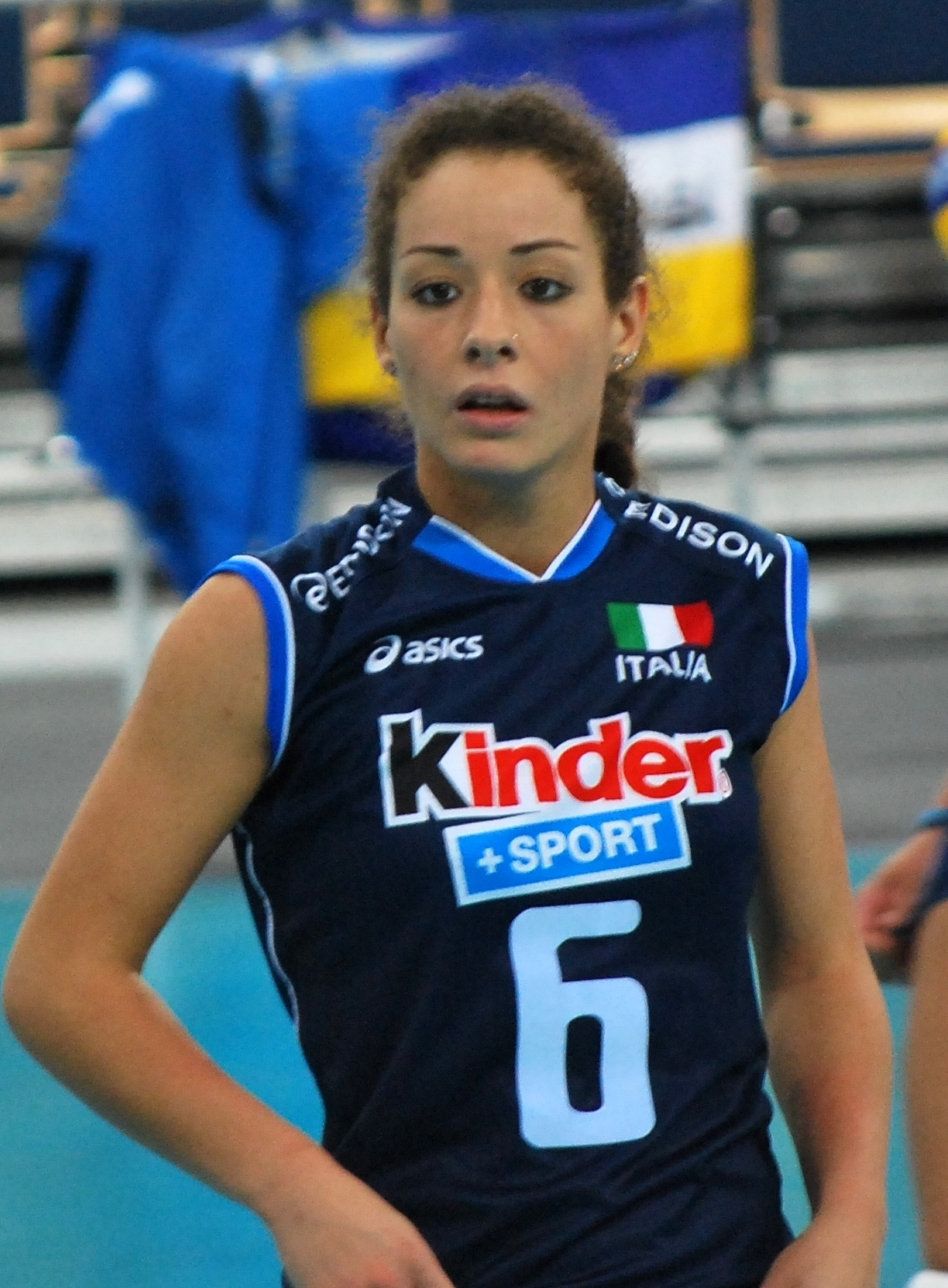
- De Gennaro during the 2012 FIVB Volleyball World Grand Prix in Łódź, Poland

Personal information
- Nickname: Moki
- Born: 8 January 1987 (age 39); Piano di Sorrento, Italy
- Height: 1.74 m (5 ft 9 in)
- Weight: 62 kg (137 lb)
- Spike: 298 cm (117 in)
- Block: 215 cm (85 in)

Volleyball information
- Position: Libero
- Current club: Imoco Volley Conegliano
- Number: 10

Career
Years	Teams
2001–2002; 2002–2009; 2009–2010; 2010–2013; 2013–	Libertas Sorrento; Vicenza Volley; Aprilia Volley; Scavolini Pesaro; Imoco Volley Conegliano

National team
2006–2025	Italy
Honours
Women's volleyball
Representing Italy
Olympic Games
Gold medal – first place	2024 Paris	Team
World Championship
Gold medal – first place	2025 Thailand	Team
Silver medal – second place	2018 Japan	Team
Bronze medal – third place	2022 Poland/Netherlands	Team
World Cup
Gold medal – first place	2011 Japan	Team
FIVB Nations League
Gold medal – first place	2022 Ankara	Team
Gold medal – first place	2024 Bangkok	Team
Gold medal – first place	2025 Łódź	Team
FIVB World Grand Prix
Silver medal – second place	2017 Nanjing	Team
Bronze medal – third place	2006 Reggio Calabria	Team
European Championship
Gold medal – first place	2021 Serbia/Bulgaria/Croatia/Romania	Team
Bronze medal – third place	2019 Turkey	Team
Montreux Volley Masters
Gold medal – first place	2018 Switzerland	Team
Mediterranean Games
Gold medal – first place	2013 Turkey	Team

Monica "Moki" De Gennaro (born 8 January 1987) is an Italian professional volleyball player. She plays for Imoco Volley Conegliano and for the Italy women's national volleyball team. She competed at the 2012 Summer Olympics, 2016 Summer Olympics, 2020 Summer Olympics and 2024 Summer Olympics. In the 2024 Summer Olympics, she won the gold medal and the best libero award. She is regarded as the greatest libero of all time.

== Career ==
De Gennaro played with her national team at the 2014 World Championship. There her team ended up in fourth place after losing 2–3 to Brazil the bronze medal match. She was selected to be tournament's Best Libero.

De Gennaro won the 2020–21 CEV Women's Champions League and was twice a runner-up with Imoco Volley Conegliano (2016–17 and 2018–19), receiving the award of Best Libero in those three editions of the Champions League.

She won both the 2019 FIVB Club World Championship and the Best Libero award in China.

She won the 2017 FIVB World Grand Prix silver medal and the Best Libero individual award.

At the 2014 FIVB World Championship she won the Best Libero award, and at the 2018 FIVB World Championship in Japan, she won the silver medal and the Best Libero individual award.

She won the 2021 Women's European Volleyball Championship and the Best Libero individual award.

== Awards and honours ==
=== Individuals ===
- 2006–07 Italian League "Best Receiver"
- 2006–07 Italian League "Best Under 20 Serie A1 player"
- 2007–08 CEV Challenge Cup "Best Receiver"
- 2013 Montreux Volley Masters "Best Receiver"
- 2014 FIVB World Championship "Best Libero"
- 2016–17 CEV Champions League "Best Libero"
- 2016–17 Italian Cup (Coppa Italia) "MVP"
- 2017 World Grand Prix "Best Libero"
- 2018 FIVB World Championship "Best Libero"
- 2018–19 Italian League "MVP"
- 2020–21 CEV Champions League "Best Libero"
- 2021 European Championship "Best Libero"
- 2021 FIVB Club World Championship "Best Libero"
- 2022 FIVB Nations League "Best Libero"
- 2022 FIVB Club World Championship "Best Libero"
- 2023–24 CEV Champions League "Best Libero"
- 2024 Summer Olympics "Best Libero"
- 2024–25 CEV Champions League "Best Libero"
- 2025 FIVB Nations League – "Best libero"
- 2025 FIVB Nations League – "MVP"
- 2025 FIVB World Championship "Best Libero"
- 2025 Volleyball World – "Best World Women Volleyball Player of the Year 2025"

=== Clubs ===
- 2010 Italian Supercup – Champions, with Scavolini Pesaro
- 2013 Italian Supercup – Runner-Up, with Imoco Volley Conegliano
- 2015–16 Italian League – Champion, with Imoco Volley Conegliano
- 2016 Italian Supercup – Champions, with Imoco Volley Conegliano
- 2016–17 Italian Cup (Coppa Italia) – Champions, with Imoco Volley Conegliano
- 2016–17 CEV Champions League – Runner-Up, with Imoco Volley Conegliano
- 2017–18 Italian League – Champion, with Imoco Volley Conegliano
- 2018 Italian Supercup – Champions, with Imoco Volley Conegliano
- 2018–19 Italian League – Champion, with Imoco Volley Conegliano
- 2018–19 CEV Champions League – Runner-Up, with Imoco Volley Conegliano
- 2019 Italian Supercup – Champions, with Imoco Volley Conegliano
- 2019 FIVB Club World Championship – Champion, with Imoco Volley Conegliano
- 2019–20 Italian Cup (Coppa Italia) – Champion, with Imoco Volley Conegliano
- 2020 Italian Supercup – Champions, with Imoco Volley Conegliano
- 2020–21 Italian Cup (Coppa Italia) – Champion, with Imoco Volley Conegliano
- 2020–21 Italian League – Champion, with Imoco Volley Conegliano
- 2020–21 CEV Champions League – Champion, with Imoco Volley Conegliano
- 2021 Italian Supercup – Champions, with Imoco Volley Conegliano
- 2021 FIVB Club World Championship – Runner-Up, with Imoco Volley Conegliano
- 2021–22 Italian Cup (Coppa Italia) – Champion, with Imoco Volley Conegliano
- 2021–22 Italian League – Champion, with Imoco Volley Conegliano
- 2021–22 CEV Champions League – Runner-Up, with Imoco Volley Conegliano
- 2022 Italian Supercup – Champions, with Imoco Volley Conegliano
- 2022 FIVB Club World Championship – Champion, with Imoco Volley Conegliano
- 2022–23 Italian Cup (Coppa Italia) – Champion, with Imoco Volley Conegliano
- 2022–23 Italian League – Champion, with Imoco Volley Conegliano
- 2023 Italian Supercup – Champions, with Imoco Volley Conegliano
- 2023–24 Italian Cup (Coppa Italia) – Champion, with Imoco Volley Conegliano
- 2023–24 Italian League – Champion, with Imoco Volley Conegliano
- 2023–24 CEV Champions League – Champion, with Imoco Volley Conegliano
- 2024 Italian Supercup – Champions, with Imoco Volley Conegliano
- 2024 Club World Championship – Champion, with Imoco Volley Conegliano
- 2024–25 Italian Cup (Coppa Italia) – Champion, with Imoco Volley Conegliano
- 2024–25 Italian League – Champion, with Imoco Volley Conegliano
- 2024–25 CEV Champions League – Champion, with Imoco Volley Conegliano
- 2025 Italian Super Cup – Runner-Up, with Imoco Volley Conegliano
- 2025 Club World Championship – Runner-Up, with Imoco Volley Conegliano
- 2025–26 Italian Cup – Champion, with Imoco Volley Conegliano
- 2025–26 Italian League – Champion, with Imoco Volley Conegliano
- 2026 Italian Super Cup – Champion, with Imoco Volley Conegliano

=== Honours ===
- 2021 Order of Merit of the Italian Republic: 5th Class / Knight
- 2024 Order of Merit of the Italian Republic: 4th Class / Officer

== Personal life ==
She has been married to the volleyball coach Daniele Santarelli since 2017.

Awards
Preceded by (Italy) Paola Egonu	Most Valueble Player of FIVB Nations League; 2025	Succeeded by TBD
Preceded by (United States) Justine Wong-Orantes	Best Libero of Olympic Games; 2024	Succeeded by TBD
Preceded by (United States) Stacy Sykora - (Serbia) Teodora Pušić	Best Libero of FIVB World Championship; 2014; 2018; 2025	Succeeded by (Serbia) Teodora Pušić - TBD
Preceded by (China) Lin Li	Best Libero of FIVB World Grand Prix; 2017	Succeeded by –
Preceded by (United States) Justine Wong-Orantes - (Japan) Manami Kojima	Best Libero of FIVB Nations League; 2022; 2025	Succeeded by (Turkey) Gizem Örge - TBD
