= Mayu Ishikawa =

Japanese volleyball player (born 2000)

Personal information
- Full name: Mayu Ishikawa 石川 真佑
- Nationality: Japanese
- Born: 14 May 2000 (age 26) Okazaki, Aichi, Japan
- Height: 1.74 m (5 ft 9 in)
- Weight: 65 kg (143 lb)
- Spike: 300 cm (118 in)
- Block: 290 cm (114 in)

Volleyball information
- Position: Outside hitter
- Current club: (Turkey) Eczacıbaşı Peron
- Number: 4

Career
- Years: Team
- 2016–2019 2019–2023 2023–2024 2024–2026 2026–present: (Japan) Shimokitazawa Seitoku (Japan) Toray Arrows (Italy) Azzurra Volley Firenze (Italy) Igor Gorgonzola Novara (Turkey) Eczacıbaşı Peron

National team
- Years: Team
- 2017–: Japan
Honours
Women's volleyball
Representing Japan
Nations League
Silver medal – second place	2024 Bangkok	Team
AVC Continental Championship
Gold medal – first place	2019 Seoul	team
Bronze medal – third place	2026 Tianjin	Team
Asian U18 Championship
Gold medal – first place	2017 Chongqing	team
U20 World Championship
Gold medal – first place	2019 Mexico	team

Mayu Ishikawa (石川 真佑, Ishikawa Mayu; born 14 May 2000) is a Japanese professional volleyball player. She's a member of the Japan Women's National Volleyball Team, as one of its outside hitters. In 2025, she is assigned as the national team's captain, and currently plays for the club Igor Gorgonzola Novara. She won the title of 2024–25 Women's CEV Cup for the first time of the club's history.

Ishikawa competed at the 2020 Summer Olympics and the 2024 Summer Olympics in Women's volleyball. She used to be the captain of Japan U-18 and U-20 national volleyball team.

== Personal life ==
Ishikawa has one older sister and one older brother, Yūki Ishikawa, who is the team captain of Japan men's national volleyball team. She was motivated by her siblings to start playing volleyball and her brother would always give good advice about spiking when she was in high school.

== Career ==
=== Early years ===
She started playing volleyball when she was in the third year of Yahagi Minami Elementary School, in Okazaki city, and joined the local club team Anjo Kita Rabbits.

In 2013, she attended Nagano City Susobana Junior High School, which is known as a strong team. In junior high school, she participated in the "National Junior High School Athletic Meet" for three consecutive years, winning twice in 2013 (1st year) and 2015 (3rd year).

After graduating from junior high school in 2016, she entered Shimokitazawa Seitoku High School, which has a prestigious high school volleyball team. She became a regular player in her first year and won the "2016 The National High School Comprehensive Athletic Meet Volleyball Tournament" (Inter-high) by defeating Kinrankai High School with a set count of 3–0. In 2017, she became the ace of the team and at the "69th All Japan Volleyball High School Championship" (Harutaka), she led the team and defeated Shujitsu High School with a straight set in the final round.

In March 2017, Mayu was first registered as a member of Japan women's national under-18 volleyball team and competed as national team representative for the first time at 2017 Asian Girls' U18 Volleyball Championship in China. She served as the captain and Japan team won the title.

In the third year of high school in 2018, she became captain of the team. In the same year, at the "2018 The National High School Comprehensive Athletic Meet Volleyball Tournament" (Inter-high), she defeated 3–0 in the final with Kinrankai High School and achieved the third tournament victory for the first time in two years. At the "73rd National Sports Festival Volleyball Competition" (Kokutai) in the fall, as the representative of Tokyo, her school had defeated Kinrankai High School with a set count of 3–1. The victory made Shimokitazawa Seitoku High School achieve two consecutive high school crowns. In January 2019, the team challenged the triple crown in the "71st All Japan Volleyball High School Championships" (Harutaka), Shimokitazawa Seitoku High School lost to Higashi Kyushu Ryutani High School with a full set in the semi-finals round.

=== Professional years ===
On January 16, 2019, Toray Arrows of the V.League Division 1 announced that Mayu would join the team as an informal player. She debuted in 2018/19 season, in the final 8 round, in the match against Hisamitsu Springs in the starting lineup.

In July 2019, at 2019 FIVB Volleyball Women's U20 World Championship in Mexico, Mayu served as the captain of the under-20 national team. Mayu led the team to victory and received the "Most Valuable Player" (MVP) and 2nd "Best Outside Spiker" awards.

In August of the same year, Japan won the gold medal at the 2019 Asian Women's Volleyball Championship, and Mayu received the same awards at the end of the competition. Her success was evaluated by Kumi Nakada, the director of the Japan senior national team, so she became a member of the 2019 FIVB Volleyball Women's World Cup Japanese roster. In the tournament, she was appointed as a starting member in the matches against United States and South Korea, and was the best Japanese scorer in both games.

In 2021, she participated in the 2021 FIVB Volleyball Women's Nations League. Mayu was also part of the Japanese women's roster for the 2020 Summer Olympics.

In April 2025, She and her club, Igor Gorgonzola Novara, won their first CEV Cup trophy. In May, it was reported that Mayu would be the new captain of the national team and lead the team competing in 2025 VNL and World Championship. She and her brother become the first siblings who serve as the captain of the Japan national team. Ishikawa led the team to two 4th places after being defeated by Poland in VNL and Brazil in the World Championship. She also took an individual award for the latter.

After two seasons with Novara, Ishikawa signed with Istanbul powerhouse Eczacıbaşı Peron for the 2026/2027 season

== Awards ==
=== Individual ===
- 2018-2019 All Japan High School Championship - Best Outside Spiker
- 2019 FIVB Volleyball Women's U20 World Championship - Best Outside Spiker
- 2019 FIVB Volleyball Women's U20 World Championship - Most Valuable Player
- 2019 Asian Women's Volleyball Championship - Most Valuable Player
- 2019 Asian Women's Volleyball Championship - Best Outside Spiker
- 2025 FIVB Women's Volleyball World Championship – Best Outside Hitter

=== High school team ===
- 2016-17 All Japan High School Championship- - Champion, with Shimokitazawa Seitoku
- 2017-18 All Japan High School Championship- - Bronze medal, with Shimokitazawa Seitoku

=== Club team ===
- 2018–19 V.League Division 1 Women's - - Runner-up, with Toray Arrows
- 2018-19 Kurowashiki Tournament - - Champion, with Toray Arrows
- 2020–21 V.League Division 1 Women's - - Runner-up, with Toray Arrows
- 2020-21 Japanese Empress' Cup - - Runner-up, with Toray Arrows
- 2024–25 Women's CEV Cup - - Champion, with Igor Gorgonzola Novara

=== National team ===
- (China) 2017 Asian Girls' U18 Volleyball Championship - - Champion
- (Mexico) 2019 FIVB Volleyball Women's U20 World Championship - - Champion
- (South Korea) 2019 Asian Women's Volleyball Championship - - Champion
