= Cristina Chirichella =

Italian volleyball player

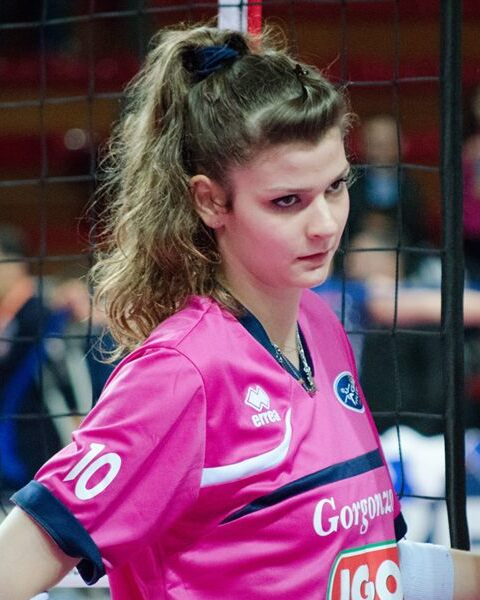
- Chirichella with AGIL Novara in 2014

Personal information
- Born: 10 February 1994 (age 32); Naples, Italy
- Height: 1.95 m (6 ft 5 in)
- Weight: 76 kg (168 lb)
- Spike: 322 cm (127 in)
- Block: 306 cm (120 in)

Volleyball information
- Position: Middle blocker
- Current club: Imoco Volley
- Number: 18

Career
Years	Teams
2010–2012	Club Italia
2012–2013	Robursport Volley Pesaro
2013–2014	Pallavolo Ornavasso
2014–2024	AGIL Novara
2024–	Imoco Volley

National team
2014–	Italy
Honours
Women's volleyball
Representing Italy
World Championship
Silver medal – second place	2018 Japan	Team
Bronze medal – third place	2022 Poland/Netherlands	Team
FIVB Nations League
Gold medal – first place	2022 Ankara	Team
FIVB World Grand Prix
Silver medal – second place	2017 Nanjing
European Championship
Gold medal – first place	2021 Serbia/Bulgaria/Croatia/Romania	Team
Bronze medal – third place	2019 Turkey	Team

Cristina Chirichella (born 10 February 1994) is an Italian volleyball player who competed at the 2014 World Championship and 2016 Summer Olympics.

== Career ==
Chirichella played with her national team at the 2014 World Championship. There, her team finished the tournament in fourth place after losing the bronze medal match 2-3 to Brazil. She won the 2016 World Olympic qualification tournament Best Middle Blocker award. She was selected to play the Italian League All-Star game in 2017.

== Awards ==
=== Individuals ===
- 2016 World Olympic qualification tournament "Best Middle Blocker"

== Clubs ==
- 2014–15 Italian Cup – Champions, with AGIL Novara
- 2016–17 Italian Championship – Champions, with AGIL Novara
- 2017 Italian Super Cup – Champions, with AGIL Novara
- 2017–18 Italian Cup – Champions, with AGIL Novara
- 2018–19 Italian Cup – Champions, with AGIL Novara
- 2018–19 CEV Champions League – Champions, with AGIL Novara
- 2023–24 CEV Challenge Cup – Champions, with AGIL Novara
- 2024 Italian Super Cup – Champions, with Imoco Volley Conegliano
- 2024 Club World Championship – Champion, with Imoco Volley Conegliano
- 2014–25 Italian Cup – Champions, with Imoco Volley Conegliano
- 2024–25 Italian League – Champion, with Imoco Volley Conegliano
- 2024–25 CEV Champions League – Champions, with Imoco Volley Conegliano
- 2025 Italian Super Cup – Runner-Up, with Imoco Volley Conegliano
- 2025 Club World Championship – Runner-Up, with Imoco Volley Conegliano
- 2025–26 Italian Cup – Champion, with Imoco Volley Conegliano
- 2025–26 Italian League – Champion, with Imoco Volley Conegliano
