= Sara Bonifacio =

Italian volleyball player (born 1996)

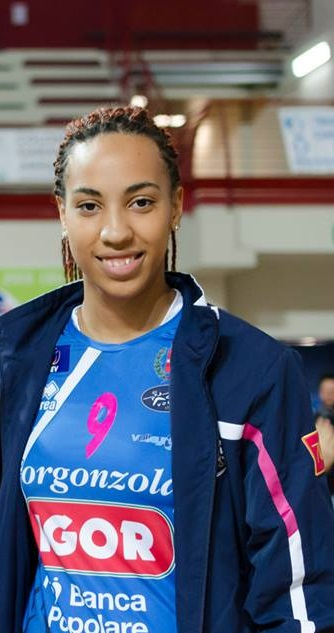

Personal information
- Nationality: Italian
- Born: 3 July 1996 (age 30); Alba, Italy
- Height: 1.86 m (6 ft 1 in)
- Weight: 75 kg (165 lb)
- Spike: 324 cm (128 in)
- Block: 244 cm (96 in)

Volleyball information
- Position: Middle blocker
- Current club: Igor Gorgonzola Novara
- Number: 13

Career
Years	Teams
2011–2014	Club Italia
2014–2018	Igor Gorgonzola Novara
2018–2020	Unet E-Work Busto Arsizio
2020–	Igor Gorgonzola Novara

National team
2014–	Italy
Honours
Representing Italy
FIVB World Championship
Bronze medal – third place	2022 Poland/Netherlands	Team
FIVB Nations League
Gold medal – first place	2022 Ankara	Team
Gold medal – first place	2024 Bangkok	Team
European Championship
Gold medal – first place	2021 Serbia/Bulgaria/Croatia/Romania	Team
FIVB World Grand Prix
Silver medal – second place	2017 Nanjing

Sara Bonifacio (born 3 July 1996) is an Italian volleyball player who plays for Igor Gorgonzola Novara.

== Career ==
Bonifacio joined the amateur volleyball club of Alba in 2005 then she was recruited for Club Italia a junior team managed by FIPAV. She signed with Igor Gorgonzola Novara in 2014. Bonifacio plays as a blocker. She was selected to play the Italian League All-Star game in 2017.

== Personal life ==
She was born in Alba, Piedmont, to a Nigerian mother and an Italian father.

== Awards ==
=== Clubs ===
- 2014-15 Italian Cup – Champion, with Igor Gorgonzola Novara
- 2016-17 Italian Championship – Champion, with Igor Gorgonzola Novara
