= Júlia Kudiess =

Brazilian volleyball player (born 2003)

Julia Kudiess
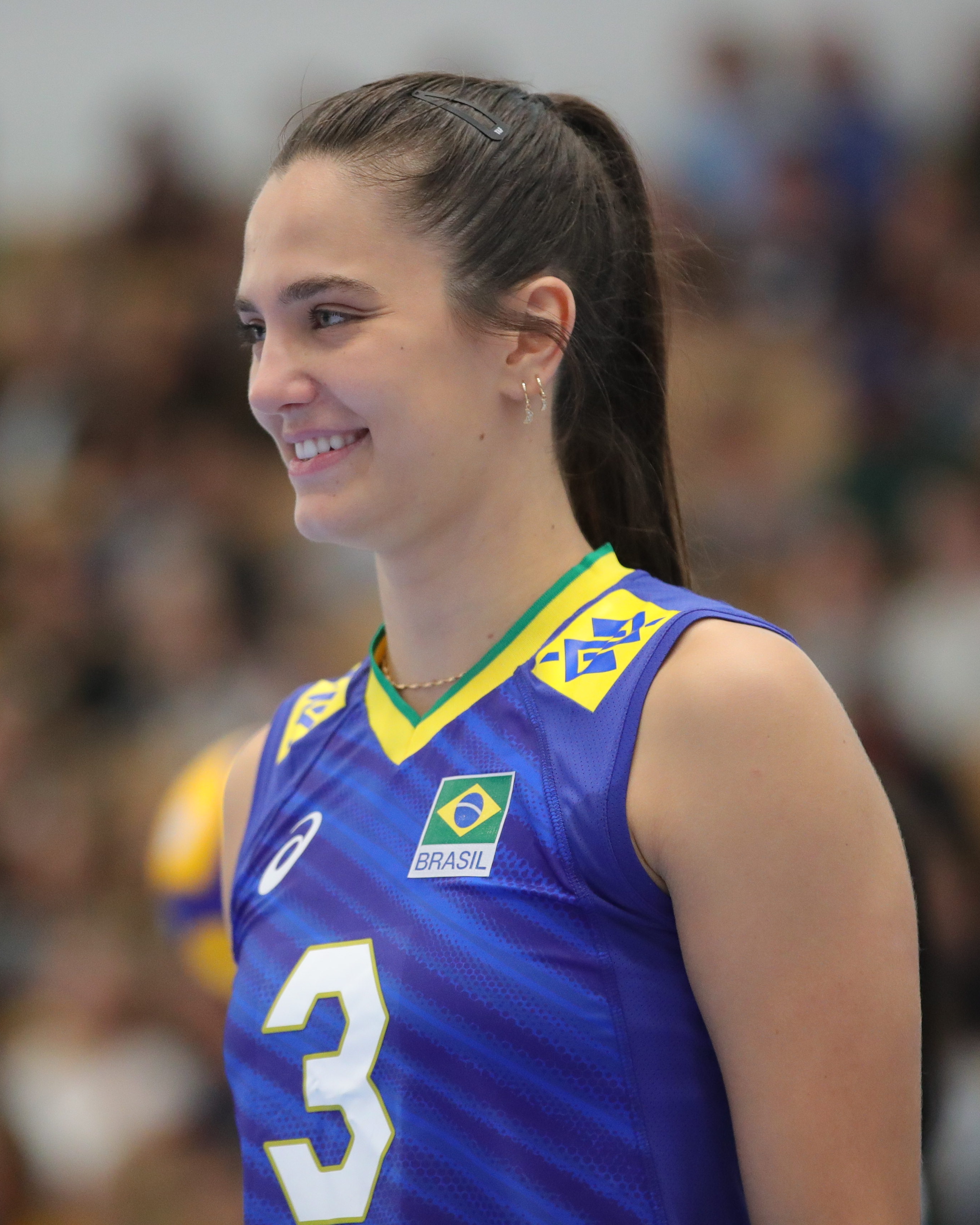

Personal information
- Full name: Julia Gambatto Kudiess
- Nationality: Brazil Brazil
- Born: January 2, 2003 (age 23); Brasília, DF, Brazil
- Height: 1.92 m (6 ft 4 in)
- Weight: 82 kg (181 lb)

Volleyball information
- Position: Middle blocker
- Current club: (Italy) Igor Gorgonzola Novara
- Number: 8

Career
Years	Teams
2018–2026	(Brazil) Minas Tênis Clube
2026-	(Italy) Igor Gorgonzola Novara

National team
2022-	Brazil
Honours
Indoor Volleyball
Representing Brazil
World Championship
Silver medal – second place	2022 Poland/Netherlands	Team
Bronze medal – third place	2025 Thailand	Team
FIVB Nation's League
Silver medal – second place	2022 Ankara	Team
Silver medal – second place	2025 Łódź	Team
Silver medal – second place	2026 Macau	Team

Julia Gambatto Kudiess (born 2 January 2003 in Brasília, DF, Brazil) is a Brazilian volleyball player and world championship silver medalist who plays as a middle blocker for the Brazil women's national volleyball team and Minas Tênis Clube.

== Personal life ==
Daughter of Jerusa Gambatto and Heinz Kudiess, a major grain producer in southern and central-west Brazil. She has German and Italian ancestry. Julia and her sister Laura started playing volleyball together, and both graduated from a school in Brasília. Their brother Bernardo also played volleyball, but both siblings later left the sport to focus on their studies.

== Career ==
=== Clubs ===
==== Minas Tênis Clube ====
Julia has been with Minas Tênis Clube since her youth career and has played professionally since 2018, winning multiple titles with the club.

=== National team ===
She has been called up to the Brazilian national team since her youth years and debuted for the senior team during the Nations League in a match against China.

On 17 July 2022, Julia won the silver medal with Brazil after losing the final of the 2022 FIVB Volleyball Women's Nations League to Italy 3–0 in Ankara, Turkey. Sets: 25–23, 25–22, 25–22.

On 15 October 2022, she won another silver with Brazil after losing to Serbia in the final of the 2022 FIVB Volleyball Women's World Championship in Apeldoorn, Netherlands. Sets: 26–24, 25–22, 25–17.

On 19 May 2024, Julia suffered a right knee sprain during a match against the United States in the 2024 Nations League that took her off the squad that would play the 2024 Summer Olympics.

In 2025, Julia returned to the Brazilian national team. Brazil finished as runner-up in the 2025 FIVB Volleyball Women's Nations League, and Julia won the award for Best Middle Blocker. She tied the tournament's blocking record with 63 blocks.

At the 2025 World Championship, held in Thailand, Julia won the bronze medal with the Brazilian national team. In that tournament, she was the best blocker of the competition with 31 blocks.

== Honors ==
=== Clubs ===
- South American Club Championship: 2022, 2024
- Brazilian Superliga: 2020–21, 2021–22, 2023–24
- Brazilian Super Cup: 2023
- Brazil Cup: 2021, 2023
- Minas State Championship: 2020, 2022, 2024

=== National team ===
- 2022 FIVB Volleyball Women's World Championship
- 2022 FIVB Volleyball Women's Nations League
- 2025 FIVB Volleyball Women's Nations League
- 2025 FIVB Volleyball Women's World Championship

=== Individual awards ===
- MVP of the 2024 South American Club Championship
- Rookie of the Year – Brazilian Superliga 2023/24
- Best Middle Blocker – 2025 Nations League (Łódź)
