= 2025 FIVB Women's Volleyball Nations League =

Siatkarskiej Ligi Narodów 2025 (Polish)

Tournament details
- Host country: Poland
- City: Łódź (final round)
- Dates: 4 June – 27 July
- Teams: 18 (from 4 confederations)
- Venue: 10 (in 10 host cities)

Final positions
- Champions: Italy (3rd title)
- Runners-up: Brazil
- Third place: Poland
- Fourth place: Japan
- Relegated: South Korea

Tournament awards
- MVP: (Italy) Monica De Gennaro
- Best Setter: (Italy) Alessia Orro
- Best OH: (Brazil) Gabriela Guimarães; (Italy) Myriam Sylla
- Best MB: (Poland) Agnieszka Korneluk; (Brazil) Júlia Kudiess
- Best OPP: (Italy) Paola Egonu
- Best Libero: (Italy) Monica De Gennaro

Tournament statistics
- Matches played: 116
- Attendance: 459,150 (3,958 per match)

The 2025 FIVB Women's Volleyball Nations League was the seventh edition of the FIVB Women's Volleyball Nations League, an annual women's international volleyball tournament. It was held between June and July 2025, and the final round took place at the Atlas Arena in Łódź, Poland.

Following the results of the 2024 Challenger Cup, Czech Republic made their debut this edition, while Belgium made their comeback as the top FIVB ranked team.

Italy won their third VNL title after defeating Brazil in the final. Poland claimed their third consecutive bronze medal after defeating Japan in the 3rd place match. Monica De Gennaro of Italy was named the MVP of the tournament.

== Teams ==
=== Qualification ===
In a change of format for this edition, none of the 16 teams that participated in the 2024 FIVB Women's Volleyball Nations League will be relegated, and from 2025 onward the competition will expand to 18 teams. The two extra spots were allocated to the Czech Republic, winner of the 2024 Challenger Cup, and Belgium, per FIVB ranking the highest ranked team that failed to qualify.

Country	Confederation	Previous appearances			Previous best performance
Country	Confederation	Total	First	Last	Previous best performance
Belgium	CEV	4	2018	2022	7th place (2019)
Brazil	CSV	6	2018	2024	Runners-up (2019, 2021, 2022)
Bulgaria	CEV	4	2019	2024	13th place (2023)
Canada	NORCECA	4	2021	2024	10th place (2023, 2024)
China	AVC	6	2018	2024	Runners-up (2023)
Czech Republic	CEV	0	None		Debut
Dominican Republic	NORCECA	6	2018	2024	6th place (2021)
France	CEV	1	2024		14th place (2024)
Germany	CEV	6	2018	2024	8th place (2023)
Italy	CEV	6	2018	2024	Champions (2022, 2024)
Japan	AVC	6	2018	2024	Runners-up (2024)
Netherlands	CEV	6	2018	2024	5th place (2018)
Poland	CEV	6	2018	2024	3rd place (2023, 2024)
Serbia	CEV	6	2018	2024	3rd place (2022)
South Korea	AVC	6	2018	2024	12th place (2018)
Thailand	AVC	6	2018	2024	8th place (2022, 2024)
Turkey	CEV	6	2018	2024	Champions (2023)
United States	NORCECA	6	2018	2024	Champions (2018, 2019, 2021)

== Format ==
=== Preliminary round ===
The format of play is generally the same as in the 2022 edition. However, this is the first time that 18 women's teams are competing. Each week 6 teams during the pool phase. Each team play 12 matches during the pool stage. Each week each team plays 4 times in a table that is set up by an algorithm, with all teams playing 12 times in total at the end of the first phase. The 8 best teams advance to the quarter-finals while the last placed team loses its place to the highest FIVB ranked team that did not compete this year. The only country that has already qualified for this phase is Poland for hosting the finals and if it does not finish the first phase among the top eight, the top seven will qualify with the Polish team being ranked 8th.

=== Final round ===
The VNL Finals will see the top eight teams moving directly to the knockout phase, which will consist of eight matches in total: four quarterfinals, two semi-finals, and the bronze and gold medal matches.

Final 8 direct elimination formula:

- The first ranked team will play a quarterfinal match against the eighth ranked team, the second ranked team will play a quarterfinal match against the seventh ranked team, the third ranked team will play a quarterfinal match against the sixth ranked team, and the fourth ranked team will play a quarterfinal match against the fifth ranked team.
- The national team of the hosting territory of the event will have a guaranteed berth for the Final round. If the host nation team do not finish in the top eight in the Preliminary round, they will replace the eighth place team and play as the eighth seed.

== Pool composition ==
The overview of pools were released on 10 December 2024.

Week 1			Week 2			Week 3		
Pool 1 Canada	Pool 2 Brazil	Pool 3 China	Pool 4 Turkey	Pool 5 Hong Kong	Pool 6 Serbia	Pool 7 Netherlands	Pool 8 United States	Pool 9 Japan
Canada; Bulgaria; Dominican Republic; Japan; Netherlands; Serbia	Brazil; Czech Republic; Germany; Italy; South Korea; United States	China; Belgium; France; Poland; Thailand; Turkey	Turkey; Brazil; Canada; Dominican Republic; South Korea; Belgium	Bulgaria; China; Czech Republic; Italy; Japan; Thailand	Serbia; Germany; Netherlands; Poland; France; United States	Netherlands; Czech Republic; Italy; Belgium; Serbia; Turkey	United States; China; Dominican Republic; Germany; Thailand; Canada	Japan; Bulgaria; France; Brazil; Poland; South Korea

== Venues ==
=== Preliminary round ===
Week 1
Pool 1	Pool 2	Pool 3
Ottawa, Canada	Rio de Janeiro, Brazil	Beijing, China
TD Place Arena	Maracanãzinho	National Indoor Stadium
Capacity: 8,585	Capacity: 11,850	Capacity: 18,000
Week 2
Pool 4	Pool 5	Pool 6
Istanbul, Turkey	Hong Kong, China	Belgrade, Serbia
Sinan Erdem Dome	Kai Tak Arena	Belgrade Arena
Capacity: 16,457	Capacity: 10,000	Capacity: 18,386
Week 3
Pool 7	Pool 8	Pool 9
Apeldoorn, Netherlands	Arlington, United States	Chiba, Japan
Omnisport Apeldoorn	College Park Center	Chiba Port Arena
Capacity: 2,000	Capacity: 7,000	Capacity: 7,512

=== Final round ===
All matches
Łódź, Poland
Atlas Arena
Capacity: 13,806
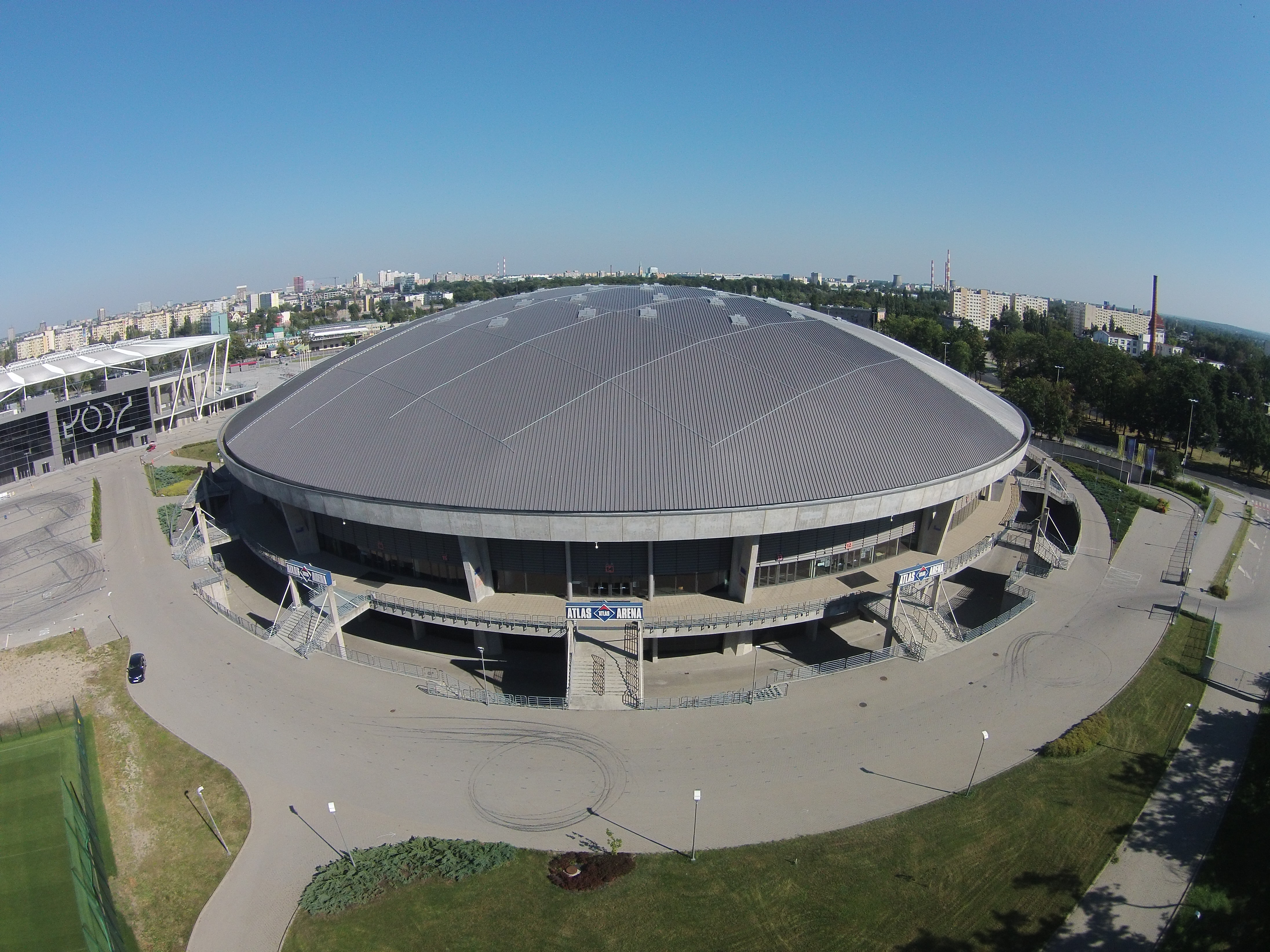

== Competition schedule ==
●	Preliminary round	●	Final round

Week 1 4–8 Jun	Week 2 18–22 Jun	Week 3 9–13 Jul	Week 4 23–27 Jul
36 matches	36 matches	36 matches	8 matches

== Pool standing procedure ==
1. Total number of victories (matches won, matches lost)
2. In the event of a tie, the following first tiebreaker will apply, with the teams ranked by the most points gained per match as follows:
  - Match won 3–0 or 3–1: 3 points for the winner, 0 points for the loser
  - Match won 3–2: 2 points for the winner, 1 point for the loser
  - Match forfeited: 3 points for the winner, 0 points (0–25, 0–25, 0–25) for the loser
3. If teams are still tied after examining the number of victories and points gained, the FIVB will examine the results in order to break the tie in the following order:
  - Sets quotient: if two or more teams are tied on the number of points gained, they will be ranked by the quotient resulting from the division of the number of all sets won by the number of all sets lost.
  - Points quotient: if the tie persists based on the sets quotient, the teams will be ranked by the quotient resulting from the division of all points scored by the total of points lost during all sets.
  - If the tie persists based on the points quotient, the tie will be broken based on the team that won the match between the tied teams during the Round Robin Phase. When the tie in points quotient is between three or more teams, these teams will be ranked taking into consideration only the matches involving the teams in question.

== Preliminary round ==
=== Ranking ===
Pos	Team	Pld	W	L	Pts	SW	SL	SR	SPW	SPL	SPR	Qualification or relegation
1	Italy	12	12	0	33	36	7	5.143	1037	822	1.262	Final round
2	Brazil	12	11	1	31	33	11	3.000	1051	906	1.160	Final round
3	Japan	12	9	3	27	30	12	2.500	966	858	1.126	Final round
4	Poland (Note: Qualified as finals' host)	12	9	3	27	31	15	2.067	1067	957	1.115	Final round
5	China	12	9	3	24	30	20	1.500	1142	1059	1.078	Final round
6	Turkey	12	8	4	23	28	17	1.647	1025	927	1.106	Final round
7	Germany	12	7	5	23	29	22	1.318	1110	1092	1.016	Final round
8	United States	12	7	5	20	26	23	1.130	1084	1085	0.999	Final round
9	France	12	5	7	17	23	25	0.920	1010	1042	0.969	
10	Netherlands	12	5	7	15	19	27	0.704	972	1029	0.945	
11	Czech Republic	12	5	7	14	21	26	0.808	1032	1046	0.987	
12	Dominican Republic	12	5	7	13	20	27	0.741	1028	1071	0.960	
13	Bulgaria	12	4	8	11	19	31	0.613	1001	1142	0.877	
14	Belgium	12	4	8	11	15	29	0.517	931	1029	0.905	
15	Serbia	12	3	9	14	21	28	0.750	1043	1068	0.977	
16	Canada	12	3	9	10	19	33	0.576	1099	1157	0.950	
17	Thailand	12	1	11	6	11	34	0.324	948	1059	0.895	
18	South Korea	12	1	11	5	11	35	0.314	877	1074	0.817	Excluded from the Nations League

Source: VNL 2025 – Women's standings

=== Week 1 ===
==== Pool 1 ====
- All times are Eastern Daylight Time (UTC−04:00).

Date	Time		Score		Set 1	Set 2	Set 3	Set 4	Set 5	Total	Report
4 Jun	11:00	Netherlands	0–3	Japan	17–25	15–25	16–25			48–75	P2 Boxscore
4 Jun	16:00	Dominican Republic	3–2	Serbia	26–28	19–25	25–15	25–20	18–16	113–104	P2 Boxscore
4 Jun	19:30	Bulgaria	2–3	Canada	18–25	12–25	25–23	25–19	4–15	84–107	P2 Boxscore
5 Jun	16:00	Bulgaria	3–1	Dominican Republic	25–21	30–32	25–19	31–29		111–101	P2 Boxscore
5 Jun	19:30	Canada	1–3	Netherlands	18–25	25–22	15–25	23–25		81–97	P2 Boxscore
6 Jun	16:00	Dominican Republic	3–2	Netherlands	22–25	25–19	28–26	22–25	15–13	112–108	P2 Boxscore
6 Jun	19:30	Serbia	0–3	Japan	19–25	21–25	13–25			53–75	P2 Boxscore
7 Jun	16:00	Canada	0–3	Japan	24–26	20–25	19–25			63–76	P2 Boxscore
7 Jun	19:30	Bulgaria	3–2	Serbia	12–25	25–19	25–16	10–25	17–15	89–100	P2 Boxscore
8 Jun	11:00	Dominican Republic	0–3	Japan	19–25	21–25	9–25			49–75	P2 Boxscore
8 Jun	14:30	Bulgaria	0–3	Netherlands	21–25	16–25	23–25			60–75	P2 Boxscore
8 Jun	18:00	Canada	3–2	Serbia	20–25	18–25	25–20	25–18	15–12	103–100	P2 Boxscore

==== Pool 2 ====
- All times are Brasília Time (UTC−03:00).

Date	Time		Score		Set 1	Set 2	Set 3	Set 4	Set 5	Total	Report
4 Jun	14:00	United States	0–3	Italy	13–25	13–25	28–30			54–80	P2 Boxscore
4 Jun	17:30	Czech Republic	0–3	Brazil	21–25	20–25	17–25			58–75	P2 Boxscore
4 Jun	21:00	South Korea	0–3	Germany	17–25	15–25	21–25			53–75	P2 Boxscore
5 Jun	17:30	Germany	2–3	Italy	25–22	10–25	25–20	13–25	9–15	82–107	P2 Boxscore
5 Jun	21:00	United States	0–3	Brazil	18–25	17–25	19–25			54–75	P2 Boxscore
6 Jun	17:30	South Korea	0–3	Italy	13–25	13–25	17–25			43–75	P2 Boxscore
6 Jun	21:00	Czech Republic	3–2	United States	23–25	20–25	25–17	25–20	27–25	120–112	P2 Boxscore
7 Jun	13:30	Germany	2–3	Brazil	23–25	25–21	25–23	20–25	8–15	101–109	P2 Boxscore
7 Jun	17:00	South Korea	2–3	Czech Republic	25–17	17–25	25–21	9–25	9–15	85–103	P2 Boxscore
8 Jun	10:00	Brazil	0–3	Italy	22–25	18–25	27–29			67–79	P2 Boxscore
8 Jun	13:30	Czech Republic	1–3	Germany	22–25	18–25	25–22	23–25		88–97	P2 Boxscore
8 Jun	17:00	South Korea	0–3	United States	13–25	26–28	17–25			56–78	P2 Boxscore

==== Pool 3 ====
- All times are China Standard Time (UTC+08:00).

Date	Time		Score		Set 1	Set 2	Set 3	Set 4	Set 5	Total	Report
4 Jun	11:30	France	1–3	Turkey	17–25	25–23	13–25	14–25		69–98	P2 Boxscore
4 Jun	15:00	Thailand	0–3	Poland	22–25	24–26	22–25			68–76	P2 Boxscore
4 Jun	19:30	China	3–0	Belgium	25–18	27–25	25–13			77–56	P2 Boxscore
5 Jun	15:00	Belgium	3–1	Thailand	25–22	25–23	24–26	25–22		99–93	P2 Boxscore
5 Jun	19:30	China	1–3	Poland	22–25	25–20	19–25	21–25		87–95	P2 Boxscore
6 Jun	15:00	France	3–1	Belgium	25–22	13–25	25–13	25–19		88–79	P2 Boxscore
6 Jun	19:30	Turkey	3–0	Thailand	25–23	25–14	25–22			75–59	P2 Boxscore
7 Jun	15:00	Turkey	3–2	Poland	25–21	18–25	25–23	22–25	15–7	105–101	P2 Boxscore
7 Jun	19:30	China	3–0	France	25–17	25–18	25–11			75–46	P2 Boxscore
8 Jun	11:30	Belgium	0–3	Poland	11–25	15–25	25–27			51–77	P2 Boxscore
8 Jun	15:00	France	1–3	Thailand	14–25	25–19	23–25	13–25		75–94	P2 Boxscore
8 Jun	19:30	China	2–3	Turkey	25–19	20–25	31–29	26–28	12–15	114–116	P2 Boxscore

=== Week 2 ===
==== Pool 4 ====
- All times are Eastern European Summer Time (UTC+03:00).

Date	Time		Score		Set 1	Set 2	Set 3	Set 4	Set 5	Total	Report
18 Jun	12:30	South Korea	3–2	Canada	27–25	25–18	15–25	20–25	15–13	102–106	P2 Boxscore
18 Jun	16:00	Belgium	1–3	Brazil	22–25	26–24	16–25	15–25		79–99	P2 Boxscore
18 Jun	19:30	Dominican Republic	0–3	Turkey	25–27	19–25	26–28			70–80	P2 Boxscore
19 Jun	16:00	Belgium	0–3	Dominican Republic	14–25	18–25	25–27			57–77	P2 Boxscore
19 Jun	19:30	Canada	0–3	Turkey	16–25	18–25	24–26			58–76	P2 Boxscore
20 Jun	16:00	South Korea	1–3	Belgium	16–25	25–20	29–31	12–25		82–101	P2 Boxscore
20 Jun	19:30	Canada	0–3	Brazil	20–25	23–25	23–25			66–75	P2 Boxscore
21 Jun	16:00	Dominican Republic	0–3	Brazil	23–25	18–25	20–25			61–75	P2 Boxscore
21 Jun	19:30	South Korea	0–3	Turkey	11–25	13–25	17–25			41–75	P2 Boxscore
22 Jun	12:30	Belgium	3–2	Canada	22–25	25–13	21–25	25–22	18–16	111–101	P2 Boxscore
22 Jun	16:00	South Korea	2–3	Dominican Republic	25–19	17–25	25–19	20–25	14–16	101–104	P2 Boxscore
22 Jun	19:30	Turkey	1–3	Brazil	18–25	25–23	23–25	15–25		81–98	P2 Boxscore

==== Pool 5 ====
- All times are Hong Kong Time (UTC+08:00).

Date	Time		Score		Set 1	Set 2	Set 3	Set 4	Set 5	Total	Report
18 Jun	13:30	Bulgaria	1–3	Italy	17–25	25–23	15–25	15–25		72–98	P2 Boxscore
18 Jun	17:00	Thailand	2–3	Japan	25–18	25–23	20–25	15–25	11–15	96–106	P2 Boxscore
18 Jun	20:30	Czech Republic	1–3	China	27–29	25–23	15–25	22–25		89–102	P2 Boxscore
19 Jun	17:00	Thailand	0–3	Italy	19–25	20–25	18–25			57–75	P2 Boxscore
19 Jun	20:30	Bulgaria	2–3	China	21–25	25–22	15–25	26–24	14–16	101–112	P2 Boxscore
20 Jun	17:00	Bulgaria	0–3	Czech Republic	19–25	22–25	11–25			52–75	P2 Boxscore
20 Jun	20:30	Japan	2–3	Italy	23–25	25–16	15–25	25–20	17–19	105–105	P2 Boxscore
21 Jun	16:30	Czech Republic	3–0	Thailand	25–18	25–16	32–30			82–64	P2 Boxscore
21 Jun	20:00	Japan	1–3	China	15–25	12–25	25–18	22–25		74–93	P2 Boxscore
22 Jun	13:00	Bulgaria	3–2	Thailand	26–24	25–13	21–25	22–25	15–9	109–96	P2 Boxscore
22 Jun	16:30	Czech Republic	0–3	Japan	22–25	17–25	20–25			59–75	P2 Boxscore
22 Jun	20:00	China	0–3	Italy	21–25	30–32	11–25			62–82	P2 Boxscore

==== Pool 6 ====
- All times are Central European Summer Time (UTC+02:00).

Date	Time		Score		Set 1	Set 2	Set 3	Set 4	Set 5	Total	Report
18 Jun	13:00	France	2–3	Germany	23–25	25–17	27–25	28–30	11–15	114–112	P2 Boxscore
18 Jun	16:30	Netherlands	2–3	Poland	25–17	23–25	25–17	12–25	10–15	95–99	P2 Boxscore
18 Jun	20:00	Serbia	2–3	United States	22–25	20–25	25–22	25–22	11–15	103–109	P2 Boxscore
19 Jun	16:30	United States	1–3	Poland	25–20	20–25	17–25	18–25		80–95	P2 Boxscore
19 Jun	20:00	Germany	3–1	Serbia	25–20	23–25	25–17	25–23		98–85	P2 Boxscore
20 Jun	16:30	France	3–0	Netherlands	25–21	25–19	25–20			75–60	P2 Boxscore
20 Jun	20:00	Germany	0–3	Poland	16–25	16–25	20–25			52–75	P2 Boxscore
21 Jun	16:30	Netherlands	0–3	United States	18–25	22–25	19–25			59–75	P2 Boxscore
21 Jun	20:00	France	3–2	Serbia	21–25	25–16	16–25	25–15	15–13	102–94	P2 Boxscore
22 Jun	13:00	Germany	2–3	Netherlands	23–25	25–19	21–25	25–23	10–15	104–107	P2 Boxscore
22 Jun	16:30	France	2–3	United States	22–25	24–26	25–20	25–21	13–15	109–107	P2 Boxscore
22 Jun	20:00	Serbia	1–3	Poland	25–22	22–25	22–25	23–25		92–97	P2 Boxscore

=== Week 3 ===
==== Pool 7 ====
- All times are Central European Summer Time (UTC+02:00).

Date	Time		Score		Set 1	Set 2	Set 3	Set 4	Set 5	Total	Report
9 Jul	13:00	Czech Republic	1–3	Serbia	25–22	22–25	26–28	18–25		91–100	P2 Boxscore
9 Jul	17:00	Italy	3–0	Belgium	25–19	25–15	25–18			75–52	P2 Boxscore
9 Jul	20:30	Netherlands	0–3	Turkey	19–25	16–25	21–25			56–75	P2 Boxscore
10 Jul	17:00	Italy	3–0	Serbia	25–17	26–24	25–20			76–61	P2 Boxscore
10 Jul	20:30	Belgium	1–3	Netherlands	24–26	22–25	25–22	22–25		93–98	P2 Boxscore
11 Jul	17:00	Belgium	0–3	Serbia	24–26	19–25	16–25			59–76	P2 Boxscore
11 Jul	20:30	Czech Republic	3–1	Turkey	25–22	25–21	4–25	25–20		79–88	P2 Boxscore
12 Jul	15:00	Czech Republic	2–3	Netherlands	23–25	25–23	25–14	19–25	10–15	102–102	P2 Boxscore
12 Jul	19:00	Turkey	2–3	Italy	19–25	25–21	25–21	20–25	11–15	100–107	P2 Boxscore
13 Jul	12:30	Czech Republic	1–3	Belgium	25–19	23–25	17–25	21–25		86–94	P2 Boxscore
13 Jul	16:00	Netherlands	0–3	Italy	23–25	26–28	18–25			67–78	P2 Boxscore
13 Jul	20:00	Serbia	3–0	Turkey	25–18	25–20	25–18			75–56	P2 Boxscore

==== Pool 8 ====
- All times are Central Daylight Time (UTC-05:00).

Date	Time		Score		Set 1	Set 2	Set 3	Set 4	Set 5	Total	Report
9 Jul	12:30	Germany	3–2	Canada	24–26	25–20	23–25	25–23	15–13	112–107	P2 Boxscore
9 Jul	16:00	Dominican Republic	2–3	China	22–25	25–17	25–22	22–25	13–15	107–104	P2 Boxscore
9 Jul	19:30	Thailand	1–3	United States	26–28	25–21	25–27	15–25		91–101	P2 Boxscore
10 Jul	16:00	Thailand	0–3	Germany	24–26	19–25	11–25			54–76	P2 Boxscore
10 Jul	19:30	Dominican Republic	1–3	United States	25–23	19–25	16–25	20–25		80–98	P2 Boxscore
11 Jul	16:00	Thailand	0–3	Dominican Republic	21–25	18–25	23–25			62–75	P2 Boxscore
11 Jul	19:30	Canada	1–3	China	22–25	15–25	25–22	23–25		85–97	P2 Boxscore
12 Jul	16:00	Germany	2–3	China	25–22	26–24	21–25	17–25	16–18	105–114	P2 Boxscore
12 Jul	19:30	Canada	2–3	United States	24–26	25–23	25–20	21–25	17–19	112–113	P2 Boxscore
13 Jul	11:30	Germany	3–1	Dominican Republic	25–20	25–13	21–25	25–21		96–79	P2 Boxscore
13 Jul	15:00	Thailand	2–3	Canada	25–17	23–25	28–30	25–23	13–15	114–110	P2 Boxscore
13 Jul	19:00	China	3–2	United States	18–25	19–25	25–21	25–16	18–16	105–103	P2 Boxscore

==== Pool 9 ====
- All times are Japan Standard Time (UTC+09:00).

Date	Time		Score		Set 1	Set 2	Set 3	Set 4	Set 5	Total	Report
9 Jul	12:00	Bulgaria	1–3	Brazil	21–25	29–27	10–25	19–25		79–102	P2 Boxscore
9 Jul	15:30	South Korea	1–3	Poland	25–18	19–25	14–25	26–28		84–96	P2 Boxscore
9 Jul	19:20	France	0–3	Japan	23–25	16–25	19–25			58–75	P2 Boxscore
10 Jul	15:30	France	2–3	Brazil	25–23	21–25	25–17	21–25	11–15	103–105	P2 Boxscore
10 Jul	19:20	South Korea	0–3	Japan	21–25	25–27	22–25			68–77	P2 Boxscore
11 Jul	15:30	Bulgaria	1–3	France	22–25	25–21	17–25	22–25		86–96	P2 Boxscore
11 Jul	19:20	Poland	1–3	Brazil	22–25	21–25	25–21	22–25		90–96	P2 Boxscore
12 Jul	15:30	South Korea	2–3	Bulgaria	22–25	20–25	25–21	25–23	13–15	105–109	P2 Boxscore
12 Jul	19:20	Japan	3–1	Poland	25–21	23–25	25–23	25–22		98–91	P2 Boxscore
13 Jul	11:00	South Korea	0–3	France	17–25	19–25	21–25			57–75	P2 Boxscore
13 Jul	14:30	Bulgaria	0–3	Poland	13–25	19–25	17–25			49–75	P2 Boxscore
13 Jul	19:20	Japan	0–3	Brazil	17–25	18–25	20–25			55–75	P2 Boxscore

== Final round ==
- All times are Central European Summer Time (UTC+02:00).

Quarter-finals
23 July
Italy	3
United States	0
23 July
Poland	3
China	2
24 July
Brazil	3
Germany	0
24 July
Japan	3
Turkey	2

Semi-finals
26 July
Italy	3
Poland	0
26 July
Brazil	3
Japan	2

Final
27 July
Italy	3
Brazil	1
Third place match
27 July
Poland	3
Japan	1

=== Quarter-finals ===
Date	Time		Score		Set 1	Set 2	Set 3	Set 4	Set 5	Total	Report
23 Jul	16:30	Italy	3–0	United States	25–22	25–21	28–26			78–69	P2 Boxscore
23 Jul	20:00	Poland	3–2	China	17–25	25–20	19–25	25–19	15–12	101–101	P2 Boxscore
24 Jul	16:30	Japan	3–2	Turkey	25–21	16–25	25–20	22–25	15–9	103–100	P2 Boxscore
24 Jul	20:00	Brazil	3–0	Germany	25–19	26–24	25–14			76–57	P2 Boxscore

=== Semi-finals ===
Date	Time		Score		Set 1	Set 2	Set 3	Set 4	Set 5	Total	Report
26 Jul	16:00	Italy	3–0	Poland	25–18	25–16	25–14			75–48	P2 Boxscore
26 Jul	20:00	Brazil	3–2	Japan	23–25	25–21	25–18	19–25	15–8	107–97	P2 Boxscore

=== Third place match ===
Date	Time		Score		Set 1	Set 2	Set 3	Set 4	Set 5	Total	Report
27 Jul	16:00	Poland	3–1	Japan	25–15	24–26	25–16	25–23		99–80	P2 Boxscore

=== Final ===
Date	Time		Score		Set 1	Set 2	Set 3	Set 4	Set 5	Total	Report
27 Jul	20:00	Italy	3–1	Brazil	22–25	25–18	25–22	25–22		97–87	P2 Boxscore

== Final standing ==
Rank	Team
1st place, gold medalist(s)	Italy
2nd place, silver medalist(s)	Brazil
3rd place, bronze medalist(s)	Poland
4	Japan
5	China
6	Turkey
7	Germany
8	United States
9	France
10	Netherlands
11	Czech Republic
12	Dominican Republic
13	Bulgaria
14	Belgium
15	Serbia
16	Canada
17	Thailand
18	South Korea

2025 Women's VNL champions

Italy
Third title

14–woman roster
Anna Gray, Alice Degradi, Carlotta Cambi, Monica De Gennaro, Eleonora Fersino, Alessia Orro, Anna Danesi (c), Linda Nwakalor, Stella Nervini, Myriam Sylla, Paola Egonu, Sarah Fahr, Gaia Giovannini, Ekaterina Antropova
Head coach
Julio Velasco

== Awards ==
- Most valuable player

(Italy) Monica De Gennaro

- Best setter

(Italy) Alessia Orro

- Best outside spikers

(Italy) Myriam Sylla
(Brazil) Gabriela Guimarães

- Best middle blocker

(Poland) Agnieszka Korneluk
(Brazil) Júlia Kudiess

- Best opposite spiker

(Italy) Paola Egonu

- Best libero

(Italy) Monica De Gennaro

== Statistics leaders ==
=== Preliminary round ===
Statistics leaders correct at the end of preliminary round.

Best Scorers (Note: Best scorers determined by scored points from spike, block and serve.)
	Player	Attacks	Blocks	Serves	Total
1	(France) Iman Ndiaye	190	20	23	233
2	(China) Wu Mengjie	204	14	12	230
3	(Dominican Republic) Brayelin Martínez	181	32	3	216
4	(China) Zhuang Yushan	172	24	9	205
5	(Dominican Republic) Gaila González	162	21	18	201

Best Attackers (Note: Best attackers determined by successful spikes.)
	Player	Spikes	Faults	Shots	%	Total
1	(China) Wu Mengjie	204	56	193	45.03	453
2	(France) Iman Ndiaye	190	75	179	42.79	444
3	(Dominican Republic) Brayelin Martínez	181	40	200	42.99	421
4	(China) Zhuang Yushan	172	48	229	38.31	449
5	(Germany) Lina Alsmeier	170	57	162	43.70	389

Best Blockers (Note: Best blockers determined by the stuff blocks, faults and rebounds.)
	Player	Blocks	Faults	Rebounds	Avg	Total
1	(Brazil) Júlia Kudiess	52	38	46	4.33	136
2	(Serbia) Hena Kurtagić	43	61	65	3.58	169
3	(Czech Republic) Magdaléna Jehlářová	41	51	74	3.42	166
4	(Germany) Anastasia Cekulaev	35	50	57	2.92	142
4	(Serbia) Maja Aleksić	35	33	46	4.38	114

Best Servers (Note: Best servers determined by aces, faults and hits.)
	Player	Aces	Faults	Hits	Avg	Total
1	(France) Iman Ndiaye	23	38	109	1.92	170
2	(Germany) Camilla Weitzel	19	20	164	1.58	203
3	(Dominican Republic) Gaila González	18	21	124	1.50	163
3	(Czech Republic) Ela Koulisiani	18	20	149	1.50	187
5	(Poland) Martyna Łukasik	17	6	110	1.42	133

Best Setters (Note: Best setters determined by running setts, faults and still sets.)
	Player	Running	Faults	Still	Avg	Total
1	(China) Zhang Zixuan	372	10	936	31.00	1318
2	(Netherlands) Sarah van Aalen	352	11	724	29.33	1087
3	(Czech Republic) Kateřina Valková	324	7	859	27.00	1190
4	(Japan) Nanami Seki	317	6	676	26.42	999
5	(Thailand) Pornpun Guedpard	311	6	669	25.92	986

Best Diggers (Note: Best diggers determined by successful digs, faults and receptions.)
	Player	Digs	Faults	Receptions	Avg	Total
1	(France) Juliette Gelin	180	52	63	15.00	295
2	(Dominican Republic) Yaneirys Rodríguez	135	68	74	11.25	277
3	(South Korea) Han Da-hye	128	45	63	10.67	236
4	(Poland) Aleksandra Szczygłowska	126	32	45	10.50	203
5	(Bulgaria) Aleksandra Milanova	124	34	43	10.33	201

Best Receivers (Note: Best receivers determined by efficient receptions, faults and serve receptions.)
	Player	Excellents	Faults	Serve	%	Total
1	(Germany) Lina Alsmeier	106	23	238	28.88	367
2	(Japan) Mayu Ishikawa	95	9	176	33.93	280
2	(Bulgaria) Aleksandra Milanova	95	17	242	26.84	354
4	(France) Juliette Gelin	74	10	145	32.31	229
5	(China) Zhuang Yushan	69	9	144	31.08	222

=== Final round ===
Statistics leaders correct at the end of final round.

Best Scorers
	Player	Attacks	Blocks	Serves	Total
1	(Brazil) Gabriela Guimarães	44	7	1	52
2	(Japan) Mayu Ishikawa	46	1	3	50
3	(Italy) Paola Egonu	43	2	4	49
4	(Poland) Magdalena Stysiak	43	5	0	48
5	(Brazil) Júlia Bergmann	39	3	1	43
5	(Japan) Yukiko Wada	42	1	0	43

Best Attackers
	Player	Spikes	Faults	Shots	%	Total
1	(Japan) Mayu Ishikawa	46	23	60	35.66	129
2	(Brazil) Gabriela Guimarães	44	19	44	41.12	107
3	(Italy) Paola Egonu	43	12	50	40.95	105
3	(Poland) Magdalena Stysiak	43	19	53	37.39	115
5	(Japan) Yukiko Wada	42	24	47	37.17	113

Best Blockers
	Player	Blocks	Faults	Rebounds	Avg	Total
1	(Poland) Agnieszka Korneluk	17	10	18	5.67	45
2	(Italy) Anna Danesi	11	8	22	3.67	41
2	(Brazil) Júlia Kudiess	11	19	21	3.67	51
4	(Brazil) Diana Duarte	10	15	22	3.33	47
5	(Italy) Sarah Fahr	7	8	18	2.33	33
5	(Brazil) Gabriela Guimarães	7	6	11	2.33	24
5	(Turkey) Aslı Kalaç	7	3	18	7.00	28

Best Servers
	Player	Aces	Faults	Hits	Avg	Total
1	(Italy) Paola Egonu	4	8	14	1.33	26
2	(Italy) Alessia Orro	3	3	28	1.00	34
2	(Poland) Martyna Czyrniańska	3	9	38	1.00	50
2	(Japan) Mayu Ishikawa	3	8	46	1.00	57
2	(Japan) Airi Miyabe	3	3	39	1.00	45

Best Setters
	Player	Running	Faults	Still	Avg	Total
1	(Japan) Nanami Seki	143	1	212	47.67	356
2	(Poland) Katarzyna Wenerska	77	0	168	25.67	245
3	(Italy) Alessia Orro	70	0	165	23.33	235
4	(Brazil) Roberta Ratzke	66	1	109	22.00	176
5	(Brazil) Macris Carneiro	51	2	84	17.00	137

Best Diggers
	Player	Digs	Faults	Receptions	Avg	Total
1	(Italy) Monica De Gennaro	40	10	17	13.33	67
2	(Poland) Aleksandra Szczygłowska	39	13	21	13.00	73
3	(Brazil) Marcelle Arruda	29	16	23	9.67	68
3	(Japan) Mayu Ishikawa	29	13	91	9.67	61
5	(Japan) Yukiko Wada	24	7	19	8.00	50

Best Receivers
	Player	Excellents	Faults	Serve	%	Total
1	(Japan) Yoshino Sato	32	2	71	30.48	105
2	(Japan) Mayu Ishikawa	26	1	51	33.33	78
3	(Brazil) Gabriela Guimarães	24	1	38	38.10	63
4	(Brazil) Júlia Bergmann	23	7	80	20.91	110
5	(Poland) Martyna Czyrniańska	21	3	75	21.21	99

== See also ==
- 2025 FIVB Women's Volleyball World Championship
- 2025 FIVB Volleyball Women's U21 World Championship
- 2025 FIVB Volleyball Girls' U19 World Championship
