= Tatiana Kadochkina =

Russian volleyball player

Tatiana Kadochkina Татьяна Кадочкина
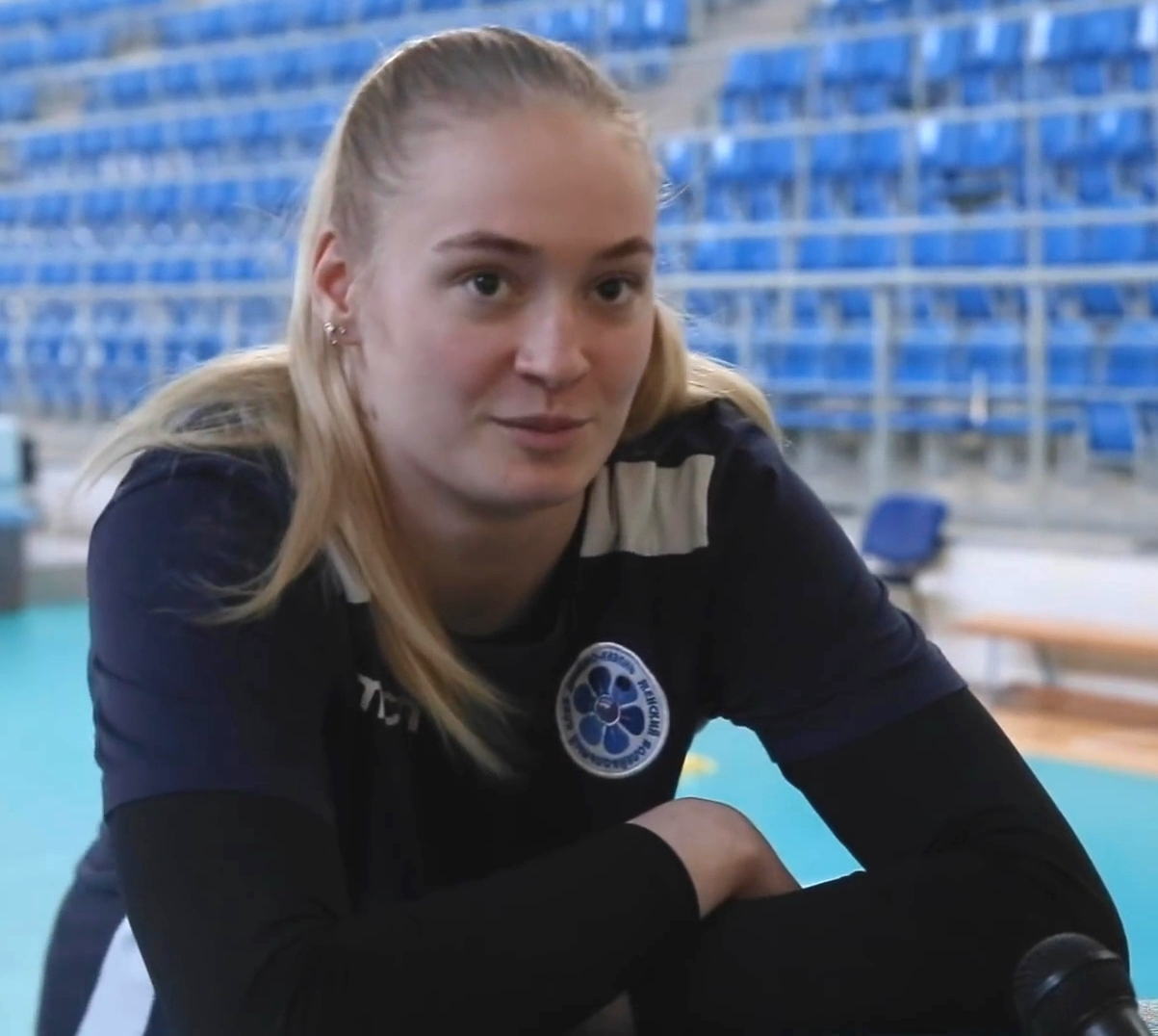
- Kadochkina in 2019

Personal information
- Full name: Tatiana Alekseevna Kadochkina
- Nationality: Russia
- Born: 21 March 2003 (age 23) Orenburg, Russia
- Height: 1.93 m (6 ft 4 in)
- Weight: 77 kg (170 lb)
- Spike: 320 cm (126 in)
- Block: 310 cm (122 in)

Volleyball information
- Position: Opposite / Outside Hitter
- Current club: Igor Gorgonzola Novara
- Number: 17

Career
- Years: Team
- 2022–: [Lokomotiv Kaliningrad]

Tatiana Alekseyevna Kadochkina (Russian: Татьяна Алексеевна Кадочкина; born 21 March 2003) is a Russian volleyball player, who plays as an opposite hitter for the Russian club [Lokomotiv Kaliningrad].

== Career ==
Kadochkina started playing volleyball in Nizhny Novgorod where she moved from Orenburg with her family in 2009. Her father Alexey Kadochkin is a former volleyball player and has been the sports director of the women’s volleyball team “Sparta” from Nizhny Novgorod since 2017.

=== Club career ===
In the 2016/17 season, Kadochkina moved to Kazan to attend the Yekaterina Gamova School which was established there in July 2016. She began to play for Dinamo-UOR-School Gamova team, which is a part of the Dinamo Kazan club, in the Premier League B of the Russian Championship. In 2018, at the age of 15, she was transferred to the main team of the Dinamo Kazan club and almost from the beginning of the 2018/2019 season, she firmly took her place in the starting lineup of the team in the Russian Super League. In December 2018, she won her first medal at the senior level, becoming the bronze medalist of the Russian Cup.

Tolok signed to the Italian Club Igor Gorgonzola Novara in 2024/2025. She played primarily as an Opposite and led the team to a CEV Cup 2025 title and was named MVP. Tolok renewed her contract with Novara for the 2026/2027 season but will play as an Outside Hitter

=== National team ===
At the age of 14, Kadochkina was invited to join Russian squad for the 2017 Girls' U18 Volleyball European Championship where the Russian team was crowned as the European champion. A few months later, she won the silver medal at the inaugural Girls' U16 Volleyball European Championship and received the “most valuable player” award for the tournament. In August 2017, 14-year-old Kadochkina again called up for the U18 team, this time for the 2017 FIVB Volleyball Girls' U18 World Championship, and won the bronze medal. She's also the member of the Russian team that won the gold medal at the EEVZA (Eastern European Volleyball Zonal Association) U16 Championship in December and was selected as the “most valuable player” of the tournament. In 2018, Kadochkina joined the U19 team and won the silver medal at the 2018 Women's U19 Volleyball European Championship.

== Awards ==
=== Individuals ===
- 2017 Girls’ U16 Volleyball European Championship "Most Valuable Player"
- 2017 EEVZA U16 Championship "Most Valuable Player"

=== Clubs ===
- 2018 Russian Cup - Bronze Medal, with Dinamo Kazan
- 2019 Russian Cup - Champion, with Dinamo Kazan
- 2019–20 Russian Super League - Champion, with Dinamo Kazan
- 2020 Russian Super Cup - Champion, with Dinamo Kazan
- 2020 Russian Cup - Champion, with Dinamo Kazan
- 2020–21 Russian Super League - Bronze Medal, with Dinamo Kazan
- 2021 Russian Cup - Champion, with Dinamo Kazan

=== National team ===
==== Junior team ====
- 2017 Girls' U18 Volleyball European Championship - Gold Medal
- 2017 Girls' U16 Volleyball European Championship - Silver Medal
- 2017 FIVB Volleyball Girls' U18 World Championship - Bronze Medal
- 2017 EEVZA U16 Championship - Gold Medal
- 2018 Women's U19 Volleyball European Championship - Silver Medal
