= Carlotta Cambi =

Italian volleyball player (born 1996)

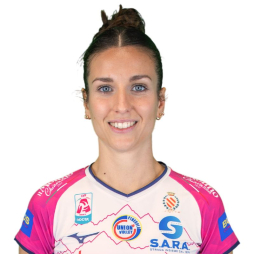
- Cambi with Pinerolo

Personal information
- Born: 28 May 1996 (age 30); San Miniato, Italy
- Height: 1.76 m (5 ft 9 in)
- Weight: 67 kg (148 lb)
- Spike: 295 cm (116 in)
- Block: 219 cm (86 in)

Volleyball information
- Position: Setter
- Current club: Igor Gorgonzola Novara
- Number: 3

National team
2017	Italy
Honours
Women's volleyball
Representing Italy
Olympic Games
Gold medal – first place	2024 Paris	Team
World Championship
Gold medal – first place	2025 Thailand	Team
Silver medal – second place	2018 Japan	Team
FIVB Nations League
Gold medal – first place	2024 Bangkok	Team
Gold medal – first place	2025 Łódź	Team
Bronze medal – third place	2026 Macau	Team
European Championship
Silver medal – second place	2026 Azerbaijan-Czechia-Sweden-Turkey	Team

Carlotta Cambi (born 28 May 1996) is an Italian volleyball player for Igor Gorgonzola Novara and the Italian national team. She is an Olympic gold medalist.

== Career ==
Cambi was born in San Miniato, but grew up in Montopoli in Val d'Arno, where she still lives.

She participated in the 2017 Women's European Volleyball Championship, 2018 FIVB Volleyball Women's Nations League, and 2019 Montreux Volley Masters.

She was selected to play in the Italian League All-Star game in 2017.

== Awards ==
=== Clubs ===
- 2015 Italian Supercup – Champions, with Pomì Casalmaggiore
- 2015–16 CEV Champions League – Champions, with Pomì Casalmaggiore
- 2016–17 Italian League – Champions, with AGIL Novara
