= Myriam Sylla =

Italian volleyball player (born 1995)

Myriam Fatime Sylla
- Sylla playing for Galatasaray in 2025

Personal information
- Full name: Myriam Fatime Sylla
- Born: 8 January 1995 (age 31) Palermo, Italy
- Height: 1.84 m (6 ft 0 in)
- Weight: 80 kg (176 lb)
- Spike: 320 cm (126 in)
- Block: 315 cm (124 in)

Volleyball information
- Position: Outside hitter
- Current club: (Turkey) Galatasaray
- Number: 17

Career
- Years: Team
- 2010–2011: (Italy) Progetto Volley Orago
- 2012–2013: (Italy) MC-Carnaghi Villa Cortese
- 2013–2018: (Italy) Volley Bergamo
- 2018–2022: (Italy) Imoco Volley
- 2022–2025: (Italy) Vero Volley Milano
- 2025–present: (Turkey) Galatasaray

National team
- Years: Team
- 2015–present: Italy
Honours
Women's volleyball
Representing Italy
Olympic Games
Gold medal – first place	2024 Paris	Team
World Championship
Gold medal – first place	2025 Thailand	Team
Silver medal – second place	2018 Japan	Team
Bronze medal – third place	2022 Poland/Netherlands	Team
FIVB Nations League
Gold medal – first place	2022 Ankara	Team
Gold medal – first place	2024 Bangkok	Team
Gold medal – first place	2025 Łódź	Team
Bronze medal – third place	2026 Macau	Team
FIVB World Grand Prix
Silver medal – second place	2017 Nanjing	Team
European Championship
Gold medal – first place	2021 Serbia/Bulgaria/Croatia/Romania	Team
Bronze medal – third place	2019 Turkey	Team
Silver medal – second place	2026 Azerbaijan-Czechia-Sweden-Turkey	Team
Montreux Volley Masters
Gold medal – first place	2018 Switzerland	Team

Myriam Fatime Sylla (Italian pronunciation: [ˈmiːrjam ˈsilla]; born 8 January 1995) is a professional Italian volleyball player. She plays outside hitter for both the Italian women's national volleyball team and the Turkish volleyball club Galatasaray Daikin in the Sultanlar Ligi.

She competed at the 2015 European Games in Baku, the 2015 FIVB Volleyball World Grand Prix, the 2017 FIVB Volleyball World Grand Prix, and the 2018 FIVB Volleyball Women's Nations League. She was also part of the 2024 Italian volleyball olympic team for the 2024 Summer Olympics, where Italy took home the gold medal.

== Early life ==
Sylla was born in Palermo, Italy, to Ivorian parents Abdoulaye and Salimata Sylla, who had migrated to Italy in the early 1990s. Due to economic struggles, they soon moved to Valgreghentino, in the province of Lecco.

Now living in Lecco, at 12 years old Sylla accompanied her cousin to a volleyball tryout for fun, but was selected to be on the team immediately. Because she was born to foreign parents, Sylla did not hold Italian citizenship, meaning she could not compete for the Italian youth or senior national team. However, this changed when Sylla was 16 years old: Sylla and her entire family acquired Italian passports, opening the door for her to play with the Italian youth national volleyball team.

== Club career ==
Sylla has played for Progetto Volley Orago (2010–2011), MC-Carnaghi Villa Cortese (2012–2013), Volley Bergamo (2013–2018), Imoco Volley (2018–2022), and Vero Volley Milano (2022–2025).

On 11 August 2025, she signed with Galatasaray of the Turkish Sultanlar Ligi.

== International career ==
Sylla made her Serie A1 debut with MC-Carnaghi Villa Cortese, before signing with Volley Bergamo in 2013. She has also been a part of the Italian Women's National Volleyball Team since 2015.

== Other ventures ==
In 2019, Sylla published her first book, Tutta la Forza Che ho (English: With all the Strength I Have) which details the difficulties Myriam has faced to get to where she is today. Additionally, in April 2024, she released the first two volumes of the Dream Volley series, with co-author Annalisa Strada. There are a total of five volumes released thus far; Forza, Vola... Vai! (Vol. 1, 9 April 2024), Una Squadra da Salvare (Vol. 2, 9 April 2024), In Transferta! (Vol. 3, 1 October 2024), La Grande Occasione (Vol. 4, 5 November 2024), and Il Nuovo Allenatore (Vol. 5, 5 February 2025).

== Awards ==
=== Individuals ===
- 2018 FIVB World Championship "Best outside spiker"
- 2019 European Championship "Best outside spiker"
- 2021 European Championship "Best outside spiker"
- 2022 FIVB World Championship "Best outside spiker"
- 2022/2023 Lega Volley Femminile "Best outside hitter"
- 2024 FIVB Nations League "Best outside spiker"
- 2024 Olympic Games Paris "Best outside spiker"
- 2025 FIVB Nations League "Best outside spiker"

=== Clubs ===
- 2015-16 Italian Cup (Coppa Italia) – Champions, with Volley Bergamo
- 2018 Italian Supercup – Champions, with Imoco Volley Conegliano
- 2018–19 Italian League – Champion, with Imoco Volley Conegliano
- 2018–19 CEV Champions League – Runner-Up, with Imoco Volley Conegliano
- 2019 Italian Supercup – Champions, with Imoco Volley Conegliano
- 2019 FIVB Volleyball Women's Club World Championship – Champion, with Imoco Volley Conegliano
- 2019-20 Italian Cup (Coppa Italia) – Champion, with Imoco Volley Conegliano
- 2020 Italian Supercup – Champions, with Imoco Volley Conegliano
- 2020-21 Italian Cup (Coppa Italia) – Champion, with Imoco Volley Conegliano
- 2020–21 Italian League – Champion, with Imoco Volley Conegliano
- 2020–21 CEV Women's Champions League – Champion, with Imoco Volley Conegliano
- 2021 Italian Supercup – Champions, with Imoco Volley Conegliano
- 2021-22 Italian Cup (Coppa Italia) – Champion, with Imoco Volley Conegliano
- 2021–22 Italian League – Champion, with Imoco Volley Conegliano
- 2025–26 Women's CEV Cup – Champion, with Galatasaray

Awards
Preceded by (China) Zhu Ting and (United States) Kimberly Hill	Best Outside Spiker of World Championship; 2018 (with (China) Zhu Ting); 2022 (with (Brazil) Gabriela Guimarães)	Succeeded by Incumbent
