= AGIL Volley =

Italian women's volleyball club

Igor Gorgonzola Novara
- Full name: Società Sportiva Dilettantistica Agil Volley ssd a r.l.
- Short name: Igor, AGIL
- Founded: 1984; 42 years ago
- Ground: PalaIgor, Novara, Italy (Capacity: 5,000)
- Chairman: Giovanna Saporiti
- Head coach: Massimo Barbolini
- League: FIPAV Women's Serie A1
- Website: Club home page

Uniforms
Home	Away

AGIL Volley is an Italian professional women's volleyball club based in Novara and currently playing in the Serie A1.

== Previous names ==
Due to sponsorship, the club have competed under the following names:

- AGIL Trecate (1984–1999)
- AGIL Volley Trecate (1999–2001)
- Asystel Novara (2001–2003)
- AGIL Volley Trecate (2003–2012)
- Igor Gorgonzola Novara (2012–present)

== History ==
The club was founded in 1984 as AGIL Volley and was based in Trecate. The club name is an acronym for Amicizia, Gioia, Impegno, Lealtà (friendship, joy, commitment, loyalty) and originally it started as a youth centre designed to help youngsters develop together through sport. The project grew over the years and investment was made to a build sports complex with a beach volleyball field and a multi-purpose sports facility for volleyball, futsal and basketball.

After spending its first years competing in regional tournaments, in 1989 the club started moving through the Italian lower leagues. By the end of the 1990s it was making good progress playing in the Serie A2 until it struggled in the 1998–99 season and was relegated to Serie B1. As four teams renounced to play the Serie A2 in the 1999–2000 season, the club avoided relegation. During that season a new approach was made, with head coach Luciano Pedullà opting to prepare a team of young players with professionalism and commitment to secure investment for the future. The club was promoted to the Serie A1 (highest level) at the end of the 2000–01 season.

Ahead of the 2001–02 season, the club moved its base from Trecate to Novara and Asystel became its main sponsor with club being renamed Asystel Novara. In its first season at the Serie A1, the club was runner up after reaching the playoff finals. In the following season it again reached the playoff finals, finishing second. The club made its debut in European competitions by winning the 2002–03 CEV Cup. At the conclusion of the season despite the two consecutive second places in the league, the European title and a guaranteed spot to play the CEV Champions League in the 2003–04 season, the club decided to focus on youth teams. It relocated to Trecate, revived its old name AGIL Volley and conceded its Serie A1 licence and the professional volleyball department to Asystel who established a new team called Asystel Volley. The licence concession meant AGIL was back to the Serie C of the Italian league.

Ten seasons later, in 2013 the club gained promotion back to the Serie A1 and relocated to Novara. In 2014–15 the club won the Italian Cup for the first time. The first Serie A1 title came in 2016–17 and two years later, AGIL won the 2018–19 CEV Champions League.

== Team ==
2026–2027 Team
Number	Player	Position	Height (m)	Birth date
2	(Italy) Ludovica Franzoso (Note: Ludovica Franzoso joined the team on 14 October 2026.)	Libero	1.70	14 January 2003 (age 23)
3	(Italy) Carlotta Cambi	Setter	1.76	28 May 1996 (age 30)
4	(Belgium) Britt Herbots	Outside Hitter	1.82	24 September 1999 (age 27)
5	(Italy) Federica Squarcini	Middle Blocker	1.83	24 September 2000 (age 26)
~~6~~	(Italy) ~~Giulia De Nardi~~ (Note: Giulia De Nardi left the team on 9 October 2026.)	~~Libero~~	~~1.71~~	~~23 April 1994 (age 32)~~
7	(Germany) Emilia Weske	Opposite	1.88	26 March 2001 (age 25)
8	(Belgium) Kaja Grobelna	Opposite	1.88	4 January 1995 (age 31)
9	(Germany) Lina Alsmeier	Outside Hitter	1.89	29 June 2000 (age 26)
10	(Italy) Ilenia Moro	Libero	1.78	5 February 1999 (age 27)
11	(Italy) Benedetta Bartolini	Middle Blocker	1.84	5 March 1999 (age 27)
13	(Italy) Sara Bonifacio (c)	Middle Blocker	1.86	3 July 1996 (age 30)
14	(Italy) Giulia Carraro	Setter	1.75	25 July 1994 (age 32)
17	(Russia) Tatiana Tolok	Outside Hitter	1.92	21 March 2003 (age 23)
18	(Brazil) Júlia Kudiess	Middle Blocker	1.92	2 January 2003 (age 23)
23	(Italy) Elena Perinelli	Outside Hitter	1.81	27 June 1995 (age 31)
27	(United States) Phoebe Awoleye	Middle Blocker	1.88	16 June 2002 (age 24)

2025–2026 Team
Number	Player	Position	Height (m)	Birth date
2	(Belgium) Silke Van Avermaet (Note: Silke Van Avermaet joined the team on 5 January 2026.)	Middle Blocker	1.92	2 June 1999 (age 27)
3	(Italy) Carlotta Cambi	Setter	1.76	28 May 1996 (age 30)
4	(Belgium) Britt Herbots	Outside Hitter	1.82	24 September 1999 (age 27)
5	(Italy) Federica Squarcini	Middle Blocker	1.83	24 September 2000 (age 26)
6	(Italy) Giulia De Nardi	Libero	1.71	23 April 1994 (age 32)
8	(Italy) Giulia Leonardi	Libero	1.65	1 December 1987 (age 38)
9	(Germany) Lina Alsmeier	Outside Hitter	1.89	29 June 2000 (age 26)
10	(Japan) Mayu Ishikawa	Outside Hitter	1.74	14 May 2000 (age 26)
11	(United States) Taylor Mims	Opposite	1.93	8 August 1997 (age 29)
13	(Italy) Sara Bonifacio (c)	Middle Blocker	1.86	3 July 1996 (age 30)
14	(Italy) Giulia Carraro	Setter	1.75	25 July 1994 (age 32)
16	(Netherlands) Indy Baijens	Middle Blocker	1.93	4 February 2001 (age 25)
17	(Russia) Tatiana Tolok	Opposite	1.92	21 March 2003 (age 23)
18	(Italy) Veronica Costantini	Middle Blocker	1.91	23 March 2003 (age 23)
~~54~~	(United States) ~~Amber Igiede~~ (Note: Amber Igiede left the team on 3 November 2025.)	~~Middle Blocker~~	~~1.99~~	~~8 January 2001 (age 25)~~
98	(Italy) Giulia Melli	Outside Hitter	1.85	8 January 1998 (age 28)

2024–2025 Team
Number	Player	Position	Height (m)	Birth date
3	(Italy) Francesca Villani	Outside Hitter	1.87	30 May 1995 (age 31)
4	(Italy) Fransesca Bosio (c)	Setter	1.80	7 August 1997 (age 29)
5	(Italy) Valentina Bartolucci	Setter	1.81	20 May 2003 (age 23)
6	(Italy) Giulia De Nardi	Libero	1.71	23 April 1994 (age 32)
8	(Italy) Eleonora Fersino	Libero	1.69	24 January 2000 (age 26)
9	(Germany) Lina Alsmeier	Outside Hitter	1.89	29 June 2000 (age 26)
10	(Japan) Mayu Ishikawa	Outside Hitter	1.74	14 May 2000 (age 26)
11	(United States) Taylor Mims	Opposite	1.93	8 August 1997 (age 29)
~~12~~	(Germany) ~~Hanna Orthmann~~ (Note: Hanna Orthmann left the team on 17 December 2024.)	~~Outside Hitter~~	~~1.88~~	~~3 October 1998 (age 28)~~
13	(Italy) Sara Bonifacio	Middle Blocker	1.86	3 July 1996 (age 30)
14	(Serbia) Maja Aleksić	Middle Blocker	1.88	6 June 1997 (age 29)
~~15~~	(Slovenia) ~~Anja Mazej~~ (Note: Anja Mazej left the team on 2 December 2024.)	~~Libero~~	~~1.70~~	~~4 January 2000 (age 26)~~
16	(Italy) Alessia Mazzaro	Middle Blocker	1.85	19 September 1998 (age 28)
17	(Russia) Tatiana Tolok	Outside Hitter	1.92	21 March 2003 (age 23)
19	(Russia) Vita Akimova	Opposite	1.97	16 July 2002 (age 24)
24	(Italy) Federica Squarcini	Middle Blocker	1.83	24 September 2000 (age 26)

2023–2024 Team
Number	Player	Position	Height (m)	Birth date
1	(Hungary) Gréta Szakmáry	Outside Hitter	1.86	31 December 1991 (age 34)
3	(Italy) Ludovica Guidi	Middle Blocker	1.86	17 December 1992 (age 33)
4	(Italy) Fransesca Bosio	Setter	1.80	7 August 1997 (age 29)
5	(Italy) Valentina Bartolucci	Setter	1.81	20 May 2003 (age 23)
6	(Italy) Giulia De Nardi	Libero	1.71	23 April 1994 (age 32)
7	(Netherlands) Anne Buijs	Outside Hitter	1.91	2 December 1991 (age 34)
8	(Italy) Eleonora Fersino	Libero	1.69	24 January 2000 (age 26)
9	(Italy) Caterina Bosetti	Outside Hitter	1.80	2 February 1994 (age 32)
10	(Italy) Cristina Chirichella (c)	Middle Blocker	1.95	10 February 1994 (age 32)
11	(Italy) Anna Danesi	Middle Blocker	1.96	20 April 1996 (age 30)
12	(Germany) Hanna Orthmann	Outside Hitter	1.88	3 October 1998 (age 28)
13	(Italy) Sara Bonifacio	Middle Blocker	1.86	3 July 1996 (age 30)
~~14~~	(Turkey) ~~Melis Durul~~ (Note: Anja Mazej left the team on 18 December 2023.)	~~Opposite~~	~~1.86~~	~~21 October 1993 (age 32)~~
21	(Russia) Vita Akimova	Opposite	1.97	16 July 2002 (age 24)
23	(Russia) Marina Markova (Note: Marina Markova joined the team in February 2024.)	Outside Hitter	1.99	27 January 2001 (age 25)
24	(Russia) Anastasiia Kapralova	Outside Hitter	1.84	24 April 2004 (age 22)

2022–2023 Team
Number	Player	Position	Height (m)	Birth date
1	(United States) Jordyn Poulter	Setter	1.88	31 July 1997 (age 29)
2	(Italy) Carlotta Cambi (Note: Carlotta Cambi joined the team on 3 January 2023.)	Setter	1.76	28 May 1996 (age 30)
3	(United States) McKenzie Adams	Outside Hitter	1.92	13 February 1992 (age 34)
5	(Italy) Giulia Bresciani	Libero	1.65	27 September 1992 (age 34)
6	(Italy) Gaia Giovannini	Outside Hitter	1.82	17 December 2001 (age 24)
7	(Italy) Ilaria Battistoni	Setter	1.74	22 April 1996 (age 30)
8	(Italy) Eleonora Fersino	Libero	1.69	24 January 2000 (age 26)
9	(Italy) Caterina Bosetti	Outside Hitter	1.80	2 February 1994 (age 32)
10	(Italy) Cristina Chirichella (c)	Middle Blocker	1.95	10 February 1994 (age 32)
11	(Italy) Anna Danesi	Middle Blocker	1.96	20 April 1996 (age 30)
12	(Spain) Lucía Varela	Middle Blocker	1.97	10 August 2003 (age 23)
13	(Italy) Sara Bonifacio	Middle Blocker	1.86	3 July 1996 (age 30)
14	(Cuba) Kenia Carcaces	Outside Hitter	1.89	23 January 1986 (age 40)
15	(Italy) Julia Ituma	Opposite	1.92	8 October 2004 (age 22)
99	(Turkey) Ebrar Karakurt	Opposite	1.96	17 January 2000 (age 26)

2021–2022 Team
Number	Player	Position	Height (m)	Birth date
2	(Italy) Lucia Imperiali	Libero	1.62	5 May 1999 (age 27)
4	(Belgium) Britt Herbots	Outside Hitter	1.82	24 September 1999 (age 27)
5	(Brazil) Rosamaria Montibeller	Opposite	1.86	9 April 1994 (age 32)
7	(Italy) Ilaria Battistoni	Setter	1.74	22 April 1996 (age 30)
8	(Italy) Eleonora Fersino	Libero	1.69	24 January 2000 (age 26)
9	(Italy) Caterina Bosetti	Outside Hitter	1.80	2 February 1994 (age 32)
10	(Italy) Cristina Chirichella (c)	Middle Blocker	1.95	10 February 1994 (age 32)
12	(United States) Micha Hancock	Setter	1.80	10 November 1992 (age 33)
13	(Italy) Sara Bonifacio	Middle Blocker	1.86	3 July 1996 (age 30)
15	(United States) Haleigh Washington	Middle Blocker	1.92	22 September 1995 (age 31)
17	(Italy) Veronica Costantini	Middle Blocker	1.91	23 March 2003 (age 23)
18	(Italy) Sofia D'Odorico	Outside Hitter	1.86	6 January 1997 (age 29)
19	(Netherlands) Nika Daalderop	Outside Hitter	1.90	29 November 1998 (age 27)
99	(Turkey) Ebrar Karakurt	Opposite	1.96	17 January 2000 (age 26)

2020–2021 Team
Number	Player	Position	Height (m)	Birth date
3	(Italy) Alessia Populini	Outside Hitter	1.79	10 September 2000 (age 26)
4	(Belgium) Britt Herbots	Outside Hitter	1.82	24 September 1999 (age 27)
5	(Italy) Francesca Napodano	Libero	1.75	17 January 1999 (age 27)
6	(Italy) Elisa Zanette	Opposite	1.93	17 February 1996 (age 30)
7	(Italy) Ilaria Battistoni	Setter	1.74	22 April 1996 (age 30)
9	(Italy) Caterina Bosetti	Outside Hitter	1.80	2 February 1994 (age 32)
10	(Italy) Cristina Chirichella (c)	Middle Blocker	1.95	10 February 1994 (age 32)
11	(Italy) Stefania Sansonna	Libero	1.75	1 November 1982 (age 43)
12	(United States) Micha Hancock	Setter	1.80	10 November 1992 (age 33)
13	(Italy) Sara Bonifacio	Middle Blocker	1.86	3 July 1996 (age 30)
14	(Italy) Sara Tajè (Note: Sara Tajè joined the team in December 2020.)	Middle Blocker	1.87	3 December 1998 (age 27)
15	(United States) Haleigh Washington	Middle Blocker	1.92	22 September 1995 (age 31)
17	(Poland) Malwina Smarzek	Opposite	1.91	3 June 1996 (age 30)
19	(Netherlands) Nika Daalderop	Outside Hitter	1.90	29 November 1998 (age 27)

2019–2020 Team
Number	Player	Position	Height (m)	Weight (kg)	Birth date
1	(Slovenia) Iza Mlakar	Opposite	1.83	72	14 November 1995 (age 30)
2	(Serbia) Jovana Brakočević	Opposite	1.96	82	5 May 1988 (age 38)
4	(Netherlands) Rachele Morello	Setter	1.92	78	7 November 2000 (age 25)
5	(Italy) Francesca Napodano	Libero	1.74	63	17 January 1999 (age 27)
6	(United States) Megan Courtney	Outside Hitter	1.85	61	27 October 1993 (age 32)
7	(Italy) Federica Piacentini	Middle Blocker	1.92	83	7 May 2001 (age 25)
8	(Poland) Zuzanna Gorecka	Outside Hitter	1.81	63	4 October 2000 (age 26)
9	(Italy) Chiara Di Iulio	Outside Hitter	1.84	64	5 April 1985 (age 41)
10	(Italy) Cristina Chirichella (c)	Middle Blocker	1.95	73	10 February 1994 (age 32)
11	(Italy) Stefania Sansonna	Libero	1.75	67	1 November 1982 (age 43)
12	(United States) Micha Hancock	Setter	1.80	68	10 November 1992 (age 33)
13	(Italy) Valentina Arrighetti	Middle Blocker	1.85	72	26 January 1985 (age 41)
16	(Bulgaria) Elitsa Vasileva	Outside Hitter	1.92	73	13 April 1990 (age 36)
17	(Serbia) Stefana Veljković	Middle Blocker	1.91	76	9 January 1990 (age 36)

2018–2019 Team
Number	Player	Position	Height (m)	Weight (kg)	Birth date
1	(United States) Lauren Carlini	Setter	1.85	77	28 February 1995 (age 31)
2	(Italy) Federica Stufi	Middle Blocker	1.85	67	22 March 1988 (age 38)
3	(Italy) Letizia Camera	Setter	1.75	61	1 October 1992 (age 34)
4	(Netherlands) Celeste Plak	Outside Hitter	1.90	87	26 October 1995 (age 30)
5	(Argentina) Yamila Nizetich	Outside Hitter	1.83	75	27 January 1989 (age 37)
10	(Italy) Cristina Chirichella	Middle Blocker	1.95	73	10 February 1994 (age 32)
11	(Italy) Stefania Sansonna	Libero	1.75	67	1 November 1982 (age 43)
12	(Italy) Francesca Piccinini	Outside Hitter	1.85	62	10 January 1979 (age 47)
13	(Albania) Erblira Bici	Outside Hitter	1.85	70	27 June 1995 (age 31)
14	(United States) Michelle Bartsch	Outside Hitter	1.92	74	12 February 1990 (age 36)
15	(Italy) Giorgia Zannoni	Libero	1.71		11 February 1998 (age 28)
17	(Serbia) Stefana Veljković	Middle Blocker	1.91	76	9 January 1990 (age 36)
18	(Italy) Paola Egonu	Opposite	1.94	70	18 December 1998 (age 27)

2017–2018 Team
Number	Player	Position	Height (m)	Weight (kg)	Birth date
1	(Greece) Anthí Vasilantonáki	Opposite	1.95	80	9 April 1996 (age 30)
2	(Italy) Letizia Camera	Setter	1.75	61	1 October 1992 (age 34)
4	(Netherlands) Celeste Plak	Opposite	1.90	87	26 October 1995 (age 30)
5	(United States) Lauren Gibbemeyer	Middle Blocker	1.88	71	8 September 1988 (age 38)
7	(Puerto Rico) Stephanie Enright	Outside Hitter	1.79	56	15 December 1990 (age 35)
8	(Poland) Katarzyna Skorupa	Setter	1.84	73	16 September 1984 (age 42)
9	(Italy) Sara Bonifacio	Middle Blocker	1.85	76	3 July 1996 (age 30)
10	(Italy) Cristina Chirichella	Middle Blocker	1.95	73	10 February 1994 (age 32)
11	(Italy) Stefania Sansonna	Libero	1.75	67	1 November 1982 (age 43)
12	(Italy) Francesca Piccinini	Outside Hitter	1.85	62	10 January 1979 (age 47)
15	(Italy) Giorgia Zannoni	Libero	1.71		11 February 1998 (age 28)
18	(Italy) Paola Egonu	Opposite	1.89	70	18 December 1998 (age 27)

2016–2017 Team
Number	Player	Position	Height (m)	Weight (kg)	Birth date
1	(Italy) Sara Alberti	Middle Blocker	1.85		3 January 1993 (age 33)
3	(Italy) Carlotta Cambi	Setter	1.76		28 May 1996 (age 30)
4	(Netherlands) Celeste Plak	Outside Hitter	1.90		26 October 1995 (age 30)
~~6~~	(Italy) ~~Sofia D'Odorico~~ (Note: Sofia D'Odorico left the team on 16 January 2017.)	~~Outside Hitter~~	~~1.86~~		~~6 January 1997 (age 29)~~
7	(Italy) Melissa Donà	Outside Hitter	1.80		11 April 1982 (age 44)
8	(Netherlands) Judith Pietersen	Outside Hitter	1.88		3 July 1989 (age 37)
9	(Italy) Sara Bonifacio	Middle Blocker	1.85		3 July 1996 (age 30)
10	(Italy) Cristina Chirichella	Middle Blocker	1.95		10 February 1994 (age 32)
11	(Italy) Stefania Sansonna	Libero	1.75		1 November 1982 (age 43)
12	(Italy) Francesca Piccinini	Outside Hitter	1.85		10 January 1979 (age 47)
14	(Netherlands) Laura Dijkema	Setter	1.84		18 February 1990 (age 36)
15	(Italy) Giorgia Zannoni	Libero	1.71		11 February 1998 (age 28)
16	(Italy) Cristina Barcellini	Outside Hitter	1.83		20 November 1986 (age 39)
17	(Croatia) Katarina Barun	Opposite	1.94		1 December 1983 (age 42)

== Head coaches ==
Period	Head coach
2012–2013	(Italy) Stefano Colombo
2013–2015	(Italy) Luciano Pedullà
2015–2017	(Italy) Marco Fenoglio
2017–2020	(Italy) Massimo Barbolini
2020–2023	(Italy) Stefano Lavarini
2023–2026	(Italy) Lorenzo Bernardi
2026–	(Italy) Massimo Barbolini

== Honours ==
=== National competitions ===
- National League: 1

2016–17

- Coppa Italia: 3

2014–15, 2017–18, 2018–19

- Italian Super Cup: 1

2017

=== International competitions ===
- CEV Champions League: 1

2018–19

- CEV Cup: 1

2024–25

- CEV Challenge Cup: 2

2002–03, 2023–24
