= 2024–25 Women's CEV Cup =

European volleyball tournament

- League: Women's CEV Cup
- Sport: Volleyball
- Duration: 5 November 2024 – 1 April 2025
- Finals champions: (Italy) Igor Gorgonzola Novara
- Runners-up: (Romania) CS Volei Alba Blaj
- Finals MVP: (Russia) Tatiana Tolok

Women's CEV Cup seasons
- ← 2023–24 2025–26 →

The 2024–25 Women's CEV Cup was the 53rd edition of the European CEV Cup volleyball club tournament.

== Format ==
Qualification round (Home and away matches):

- 32nd finals

Main phase (Home and away matches):

- 16th finals → 8th finals → Playoffs → Quarter-finals

Final phase (Home and away matches):

- Semi-finals → Finals

Aggregate score is counted as follows: 3 points for 3–0 or 3–1 win, 2 points for 3–2 win, 1 point for 2–3 loss.
In case the teams are tied after two legs, a Golden Set is played immediately at the completion of the second leg.

== Teams ==
Rankings	Country	Number of teams	Teams
1	Germany	1	Dresdner SC
2	Austria	1	TI Volley Innsbruck
3	Belgium	1	Tchalou Chapelle-Herlaimont
4	Czech Republic	2	Dukla Liberec
4	Czech Republic	2	VK Prostějov
5	France	3	Volero Le Cannet
5	France	3	Vandœuvre Nancy VB
5	France	3	Volley Mulhouse Alsace
6	Croatia	1	OK Dinamo Zagreb
7	Spain	2	Tenerife Libby’s La Laguna
7	Spain	2	Avarca de Menorca
8	Switzerland	1	Vitéos Neuchâtel UC
9	Italy	1	Igor Gorgonzola Novara
10	Hungary	2	Kaposvári NRC
10	Hungary	2	Swietelsky Békéscsaba
11	Poland	2	Moya Radomka Radom
11	Poland	2	ŁKS Commercecon Łódź
12	Romania	1	CS Volei Alba Blaj
13	Serbia	1	Crvena Zvezda Beograd
14	Slovenia	1	Nova KBM Branik Maribor
15	Turkey	2	Kuzeyboru
15	Turkey	2	Türk Hava Yolları

Teams eliminated from Champions League qualification round

Country	Teams
Belgium	Asterix Avo
Bosnia and Herzegovina	ŽOK Gacko RD Swisslion
Montenegro	OK Herceg Novi
North Macedonia	Rabotnički Skopje
Spain	Hidramar Gran Canaria

== Draw ==
The draw was held on 16 July 2024 in Luxembourg.

== 16th finals ==
Team 1	Agg.	Team 2	1st leg	2nd leg	Golden Set
Kuzeyboru (Turkey)	6–0	(Croatia) OK Dinamo Zagreb	3–1	3–0	
Tenerife Libby’s La Laguna (Spain)	6–0	(Hungary) Kaposvári NRC	3–1	3–1	
Swietelsky Békéscsaba (Hungary)	4–2	(Austria) TI Volley Innsbruck	3–0	2–3	
Volero Le Cannet (France)	3–3	(Serbia) Crvena Zvezda Beograd	3–1	1–3	15–12
Vandœuvre Nancy VB (France)	6–0	(Germany) Dresdner SC	3–1	3–0	
Moya Radomka Radom (Poland)	6–0	(Czech Republic) Dukla Liberec	3–0	3–0	
Volley Mulhouse Alsace (France)	6–0	(Bosnia and Herzegovina) ŽOK Gacko RD Swisslion	3–0	3–0	
ŁKS Commercecon Łódź (Poland)	6–0	(Spain) Hidramar Gran Canaria	3–0	3–0	
Türk Hava Yolları (Turkey)	6–0	(Montenegro) OK Herceg Novi	3–0	3–0	
CS Volei Alba Blaj (Romania)	6–0	(North Macedonia) Rabotnički Skopje	3–0	3–0	
Tchalou Chapelle-Herlaimont (Belgium)	0–6	(Belgium) Asterix Avo	1–3	0–3	
Igor Gorgonzola Novara (Italy)	–	Bye	–	–	
Vitéos Neuchâtel UC (Switzerland)	–	Bye	–	–	
Nova KBM Branik Maribor (Slovenia)	–	Bye	–	–	
Avarca de Menorca (Spain)	–	Bye	–	–	
VK Prostějov (Czech Republic)	–	Bye	–	–	

=== Matches ===
All times local.

Date	Time		Score		Set 1	Set 2	Set 3	Set 4	Set 5	Total	Report
First leg
5 Nov	19:00	Kuzeyboru (Turkey)	3–1	(Croatia) OK Dinamo Zagreb	25–15	27–29	25–12	25–16		102–72	P2 Report
5 Nov	19:00	CS Volei Alba Blaj (Romania)	3–0	(North Macedonia) Rabotnički Skopje	25–17	25–8	25–8			75–33	P2 Report
5 Nov	19:00	OK Herceg Novi (Montenegro)	0–3	(Turkey) Türk Hava Yolları	17–25	21–25	16–25			54–75	P2 Report
5 Nov	19:00	Tenerife Libby’s La Laguna (Spain)	3–1	(Hungary) Kaposvári NRC	25–16	16–25	25–16	25–19		91–76	P2 Report
6 Nov	18:00	ŽOK Gacko RD Swisslion (Bosnia and Herzegovina)	0–3	(France) Volley Mulhouse Alsace	11–25	13–25	22–25			46–75	P2 Report
6 Nov	18:00	Swietelsky Békéscsaba (Hungary)	3–0	(Austria) TI Volley Innsbruck	25–17	25–20	25–13			75–50	P2 Report
6 Nov	20:00	Asterix Avo (Belgium)	3–1	(Belgium) Tchalou Chapelle-Herlaimont	27–25	26–28	26–24	25–17		104–94	P2 Report
6 Nov	20:00	Volero Le Cannet (France)	3–1	(Serbia) Crvena Zvezda Beograd	23–25	25–15	25–19	25–23		98–82	P2 Report
6 Nov	20:00	Vandœuvre Nancy VB (France)	3–1	(Germany) Dresdner SC	25–23	25–21	17–25	25–23		92–92	P2 Report
7 Nov	17:30	Moya Radomka Radom (Poland)	3–0	(Czech Republic) Dukla Liberec	25–15	25–15	25–23			75–53	P2 Report
7 Nov	19:00	Hidramar Gran Canaria (Spain)	0–3	(Poland) ŁKS Commercecon Łódź	26–28	20–25	18–25			64–78	P2 Report
Second leg
12 Nov	17:00	Crvena Zvezda Beograd (Serbia)	3–1	(France) Volero Le Cannet	25–27	25–13	25–15	25–18		100–73	P2 Report
Golden set		Crvena Zvezda Beograd (Serbia)	12–15	(France) Volero Le Cannet							
12 Nov	18:00	Rabotnički Skopje (North Macedonia)	0–3	(Romania) CS Volei Alba Blaj	14–25	11–25	11–25			36–75	P2 Report
12 Nov	19:00	Volley Mulhouse Alsace (France)	3–0	(Bosnia and Herzegovina) ŽOK Gacko RD Swisslion	28–26	25–18	25–17			78–61	P2 Report
12 Nov	20:00	OK Dinamo Zagreb (Croatia)	0–3	(Turkey) Kuzeyboru	17–25	15–25	24–26			56–76	P2 Report
13 Nov	19:00	Türk Hava Yolları (Turkey)	3–0	(Montenegro) OK Herceg Novi	25–14	25–15	25–16			75–45	P2 Report
13 Nov	18:00	Dukla Liberec (Czech Republic)	0–3	(Poland) Moya Radomka Radom	21–25	20–25	21–25			62–75	P2 Report
13 Nov	18:00	Kaposvári NRC (Hungary)	1–3	(Spain) Tenerife Libby’s La Laguna	25–15	22–25	22–25	21–25		90–90	P2 Report
13 Nov	18:00	ŁKS Commercecon Łódź (Poland)	3–0	(Spain) Hidramar Gran Canaria	25–14	25–15	25–14			75–43	P2 Report
13 Nov	19:00	TI Volley Innsbruck (Austria)	3–2	(Hungary) Swietelsky Békéscsaba	19–25	28–26	14–25	25–19	15–11	101–106	P2 Report
13 Nov	19:00	Dresdner SC (Germany)	0–3	(France) Vandoeuvre Nancy VB	22–25	18–25	17–25			57–75	P2
13 Nov	20:00	Tchalou Chapelle-Herlaimont (Belgium)	0–3	(Belgium) Asterix Avo	19–25	32–34	20–25			71–84	P2 Report

== 8th finals ==
Team 1	Agg.	Team 2	1st leg	2nd leg	Golden Set
ŁKS Commercecon Łódź (Poland)	0–6	(Italy) Igor Gorgonzola Novara	0–3	0–3	
Swietelsky Békéscsaba (Hungary)	0–6	(Turkey) Türk Hava Yolları	0–3	0–3	
Nova KBM Branik Maribor (Slovenia)	0–6	(France) Vandœuvre Nancy VB	0–3	0–3	
Kuzeyboru (Turkey)	5–1	(France) Volley Mulhouse Alsace	3–1	3–2	
Asterix Avo (Belgium)	3–3	(France) Volero Le Cannet	3–0	0–3	15–11
Avarca de Menorca (Spain)	6–0	(Spain) Tenerife Libby’s La Laguna	3–1	3–1	
VK Prostějov (Czech Republic)	1–5	(Romania) CS Volei Alba Blaj	1–3	2–3	
Vitéos Neuchâtel UC (Switzerland)	2–4	(Poland) Moya Radomka Radom	0–3	3–2	

=== Matches ===
All times local.

Date	Time		Score		Set 1	Set 2	Set 3	Set 4	Set 5	Total	Report
First leg
26 Nov	20:30	ŁKS Commercecon Łódź (Poland)	0–3	(Italy) Igor Gorgonzola Novara	17–25	15–25	21–25			53–75	P2 Report
27 Nov	19:00	Kuzeyboru (Turkey)	3–1	(France) Volley Mulhouse Alsace	26–28	25–17	27–25	25–23		103–93	P2 Report
27 Nov	18:00	Swietelsky Békéscsaba (Hungary)	0–3	(Turkey) Türk Hava Yolları	15–25	22–25	19–25			56–75	P2 Report
27 Nov	18:00	Nova KBM Branik Maribor (Slovenia)	0–3	(France) Vandœuvre Nancy VB	23–25	23–25	18–25			64–75	P2 Report
27 Nov	20:00	Asterix Avo (Belgium)	3–0	(France) Volero Le Cannet	25–19	25–21	25–22			75–62	P2 Report
27 Nov	20:00	Avarca de Menorca (Spain)	3–1	(Spain) Tenerife Libby’s La Laguna	25–22	25–16	22–25	25–19		97–82	P2 Report
28 Nov	18:00	VK Prostějov (Czech Republic)	1–3	(Romania) CS Volei Alba Blaj	25–21	17–25	20–25	21–25		83–96	P2 Report
28 Nov	20:00	Vitéos Neuchâtel UC (Switzerland)	0–3	(Poland) Moya Radomka Radom	28–30	24–26	28–30			80–86	P2 Report
Second leg
10 Dec	14:00	Türk Hava Yolları (Turkey)	3–0	(Hungary) Swietelsky Békéscsaba	25–14	25–19	25–17			75–50	P2 Report
10 Dec	19:00	Volley Mulhouse Alsace (France)	2–3	(Turkey) Kuzeyboru	25–22	25–22	20–25	22–25	13–15	105–109	P2 Report
10 Dec	19:00	Tenerife Libby’s La Laguna (Spain)	1–3	(Spain) Avarca de Menorca	21–25	20–25	25–15	21–25		87–90	P2 Report
10 Dec	20:00	Vandœuvre Nancy VB (France)	3–0	(Slovenia) Nova KBM Branik Maribor	25–6	25–21	25–20			75–47	P2 Report
11 Dec	18:00	CS Volei Alba Blaj (Romania)	3–2	(Czech Republic) VK Prostějov	25–21	16–25	25–14	27–29	15–6	108–95	P2 Report
11 Dec	20:00	Igor Gorgonzola Novara (Italy)	3–0	(Poland) ŁKS Commercecon Łódź	25–21	25–19	28–26			78–66	P2 Report
11 Dec	20:00	Volero Le Cannet (France)	3–0	(Belgium) Asterix Avo	25–23	25–19	25–22			75–64	P2 Report
Golden set		Volero Le Cannet (France)	11–15	(Belgium) Asterix Avo							
11 Dec	20:30	Moya Radomka Radom (Poland)	2–3	(Switzerland) Vitéos Neuchâtel UC	21–25	23–25	25–11	25–18	19–21	113–100	P2 Report

== Playoffs ==
Team 1	Agg.	Team 2	1st leg	2nd leg	Golden Set
Moya Radomka Radom (Poland)	3–3	(France) Vandœuvre Nancy VB	1–3	3–0	18–16
Asterix Avo (Belgium)	0–6	(Turkey) Türk Hava Yolları	0–3	0–3	
Avarca de Menorca (Spain)	0–6	(Romania) CS Volei Alba Blaj	0–3	0–3	
Kuzeyboru (Turkey)	3–3	(Italy) Igor Gorgonzola Novara	3–1	0–3	5–15

=== Matches ===
All times local.

Date	Time		Score		Set 1	Set 2	Set 3	Set 4	Set 5	Total	Report
First leg
7 Jan	20:30	Moya Radomka Radom (Poland)	1–3	(France) Vandœuvre Nancy VB	22–25	25–15	23–25	13–25		83–90	P2 Report
8 Jan	20:00	Asterix Avo (Belgium)	0–3	(Turkey) Türk Hava Yolları	21–25	18–25	22–25			61–75	P2 Report
8 Jan	20:00	Avarca de Menorca (Spain)	0–3	(Romania) CS Volei Alba Blaj	23–25	14–25	23–25			60–75	P2 Report
9 Jan	19:00	Kuzeyboru (Turkey)	3–1	(Italy) Igor Gorgonzola Novara	25–23	15–25	25–13	25–23		90–84	P2 Report
Second leg
21 Jan	18:00	CS Volei Alba Blaj (Romania)	3–0	(Spain) Avarca de Menorca	25–21	25–16	25–22			75–59	P2 Report
22 Jan	20:00	Igor Gorgonzola Novara (Italy)	3–0	(Turkey) Kuzeyboru	25–21	25–20	25–21			75–62	P2 Report
Golden set		Igor Gorgonzola Novara (Italy)	15–5	(Turkey) Kuzeyboru							
22 Jan	20:00	Vandœuvre Nancy VB (France)	0–3	(Poland) Moya Radomka Radom	19–25	19–25	35–37			73–87	P2 Report
Golden set		Vandœuvre Nancy VB (France)	16–18	(Poland) Moya Radomka Radom							
23 Jan	17:00	Türk Hava Yolları (Turkey)	3–0	(Belgium) Asterix Avo	25–19	25–23	25–17			75–59	P2 Report

== Quarter-finals ==
Team 1	Agg.	Team 2	1st leg	2nd leg	Golden Set
Igor Gorgonzola Novara (Italy)	6–0	(Bulgaria) Maritza Plovdiv	3–0	3–0	
FC Porto (Portugal)	0–6	(Romania) CS Volei Alba Blaj	0–3	1–3	
Vasas Óbuda Budapest (Hungary)	4–2	(Poland) Moya Radomka Radom	3–1	2–3	
BKS Bostik ZGO Bielsko-Biała (Poland)	3–3	(Turkey) Türk Hava Yolları	3–1	0–3	7–15

=== Matches ===
All times local.

Date	Time		Score		Set 1	Set 2	Set 3	Set 4	Set 5	Total	Report
First leg
4 Feb	20:00	Igor Gorgonzola Novara (Italy)	3–0	(Bulgaria) Maritza Plovdiv	25–20	25–13	25–19			75–52	P2 Report
4 Feb	20:30	FC Porto (Portugal)	0–3	(Romania) CS Volei Alba Blaj	22–25	20–25	21–25			63–75	P2 Report
6 Feb	18:00	Vasas Óbuda Budapest (Hungary)	3–1	(Poland) Moya Radomka Radom	19–25	25–20	25–19	25–21		94–85	P2 Report
5 Feb	18:00	BKS Bostik ZGO Bielsko-Biała (Poland)	3–1	(Turkey) Türk Hava Yolları	25–16	20–25	25–21	25–12		95–74	P2 Report
Second leg
18 Feb	19:00	Maritza Plovdiv (Bulgaria)	0–3	(Italy) Igor Gorgonzola Novara	21–25	19–25	14–25			54–75	P2 Report
18 Feb	20:30	Moya Radomka Radom (Poland)	3–2	(Hungary) Vasas Óbuda Budapest	25–15	25–22	25–27	29–31	15–12	119–107	P2 Report
20 Feb	18:00	Türk Hava Yolları (Turkey)	3–0	(Poland) BKS Bostik ZGO Bielsko-Biała	25–19	25–15	25–20			75–54	P2 Report
Golden set		Türk Hava Yolları (Turkey)	15–7	(Poland) BKS Bostik ZGO Bielsko-Biała							
20 Feb	18:00	CS Volei Alba Blaj (Romania)	3–1	(Portugal) FC Porto	25–13	23–25	25–9	25–22		98–69	P2 Report

== Semi-finals ==
Team 1	Agg.	Team 2	1st leg	2nd leg
Igor Gorgonzola Novara (Italy)	6–0	(Turkey) Türk Hava Yolları	3–0	3–0
Vasas Óbuda Budapest (Hungary)	1–5	(Romania) CS Volei Alba Blaj	2–3	0–3

=== Matches ===
All times local.

Date	Time		Score		Set 1	Set 2	Set 3	Set 4	Set 5	Total	Report
First leg
4 Mar	17:00	Vasas Óbuda Budapest (Hungary)	2–3	(Romania) CS Volei Alba Blaj	26–24	19–25	25–9	18–25	9–15	97–98	P2 Report
5 Mar	20:00	Igor Gorgonzola Novara (Italy)	3–0	(Turkey) Türk Hava Yolları	25–23	25–18	26–24			76–65	P2 Report
Second leg
11 Mar	18:00	CS Volei Alba Blaj (Romania)	3–0	(Hungary) Vasas Óbuda Budapest	25–18	25–22	25–21			75–61	P2 Report
13 Mar	14:00	Türk Hava Yolları (Turkey)	0–3	(Italy) Igor Gorgonzola Novara	25–27	24–26	18–25			67–78	P2 Report

== Final ==
Team 1	Agg.	Team 2	1st leg	2nd leg
Igor Gorgonzola Novara (Italy)	6–1	(Romania) CS Volei Alba Blaj	3–1	3–0

=== Matches ===
All times local.

Date	Time		Score		Set 1	Set 2	Set 3	Set 4	Set 5	Total	Report
First leg
25 Mar	20:00	Igor Gorgonzola Novara (Italy)	3–1	(Romania) CS Volei Alba Blaj	25–12	25–20	20–25	25–17		95–74	P2 Report
Second leg
1 Apr	18:00	CS Volei Alba Blaj (Romania)	0–3	(Italy) Igor Gorgonzola Novara	28–30	17–25	26–28			71–83	P2 Report

== Final standings ==
Rank	Team
1st place, gold medalist(s)	(Italy) Igor Gorgonzola Novara
2nd place, silver medalist(s)	(Romania) CS Volei Alba Blaj
Semifinalists	(Turkey) Türk Hava Yolları (Hungary) Vasas Óbuda Budapest

2024–25 CEV Cup winners
(Italy)
Igor Gorgonzola Novara
1st title

== See also ==
- 2024–25 CEV Champions League
- 2024–25 CEV Cup
- 2024–25 CEV Challenge Cup
- 2024–25 CEV Women's Champions League
- 2024–25 CEV Women's Challenge Cup
