= Coppa Italia (women's volleyball) =

Volleyball in Italy

- Sport: Volleyball
- Founded: 1979; 47 years ago
- Administrator: FIPAV
- Country: Italy
- Continent: Europe
- Most recent champion: Imoco Volley (8 titles)
- Most titles: Imoco Volley (8 titles)
- Broadcaster: RAI Sport
- Related competitions: Serie A1 (qualifier)
- Website: https://coppaitalia.legavolleyfemminile.it/

The Italian Women's Volleyball Cup in (Italian: Coppa Italia di Pallavolo Femminile) is an Italian women's volleyball competition organized every year since 1979 by the Lega Volley Femminile. The top eight ranked teams of the Serie A1 at the end of the first half of the regular season are qualified for this single-elimination tournament. In the quarter-finals the 1st ranked team plays against the 8th ranked team, the 2nd ranked team plays against the 7th ranked team, the 3rd ranked team plays against the 6th ranked team and the 4th ranked team plays against the 5th ranked team. The winners advance to the final four which is played on a single weekend with the semi-finals on the Saturday and the final on the Sunday.

== Winners list ==
Years	Winners	Score	Runners-up
1979	Alidea Catania		
1980	Manoceram Ravenna		
1981	Diana Docks Ravenna		
1982	Nelsen Reggio Emilia		
1983	Nelsen Reggio Emilia		
1984	Teodora Ravenna		
1985	Teodora Ravenna		
1986	Nelsen Reggio Emilia		
1987	Teodora Ravenna		
1988	Vini di Puglia Bari		
1989	Braglia Reggio Emilia		
1990	Cemar Modena		
1991	Il Messaggero Ravenna		Imet Perugia
1992	Imet Perugia		
1993	Latte Rugiada Matera		
1994	Latte Rugiada Matera		Isola Verde Modena
1995	Latte Rugiada Matera	3–2 (15–10, 11–15, 15–12, 12–15, 18–16)	Fincres Roma
1996	Foppapedretti Bergamo	3–0 (16–14, 15–11, 15–10)	Anthesis Volley Modena
1997	Foppapedretti Bergamo	3–0 (15–11, 15–10, 15–9)	Anthesis Modena
1998	Foppapedretti Bergamo	3–1 (15–12, 11–15, 15–7, 15–12)	Cermagica Reggio Emilia
1999	Despar Perugia	3–0 (15–9, 15–10, 15–11)	Medinex Reggio Calabria
2000	Medinex Reggio Calabria	3–0 (25–14, 25–20, 25–23)	Phone Limited Modena
2001	Capo Sud Reggio Calabria	3–2 (19–25, 25–21, 20–25, 25–14, 20–18)	Radio 105 Foppapedretti Bergamo
2002	Edison Modena	3–0 (25–15, 25–19, 25–23)	Radio 105 Foppapedretti Bergamo
2003	Despar Perugia	3–1 (25–20, 25–14, 23–25, 25–23)	Monte Schiavo Banca Marche Jesi
2004	Asystel Novara	3–2 (19–25, 25–22, 19–25, 27–25, 15–9)	Radio 105 Foppapedretti Bergamo
2005	Despar Perugia	3–2 (21–25, 25–20, 16–25, 25–13, 15–11)	Radio 105 Foppapedretti Bergamo
2006	Radio 105 Foppapedretti Bergamo	3–1 (25–22, 25–15, 23–25, 25–14)	Monte Schiavo Banca Marche Jesi
2007	Despar Perugia	3–1 (20–25, 25–22, 25–17, 25–20)	Scavolini Pesaro
2008	Foppapedretti Bergamo	3–2 (22–25, 25–22, 19–25, 29–27, 18–16)	Scavolini Pesaro
2009	Scavolini Pesaro	3–0 (26–24, 25–23, 25–19)	Asystel Volley Novara
2010	MC-Carnaghi Villa Cortese	3–2 (25–23, 25–22, 23–25, 17–25, 15–13)	Foppapedretti Bergamo
2011	MC-Carnaghi Villa Cortese	3–1 (24–26, 25–21, 25–23, 25–20)	Norda Foppapedretti Bergamo
2012	Yamamay Busto Arsizio	3–0 (25–13, 25–18, 25–17)	Rebecchi Nordmeccanica Piacenza
2013	Rebecchi Nordmeccanica Piacenza	3–0 (25–22, 25–21, 25–20)	Mc Carnaghi Villa Cortese
2014	Rebecchi Nordmeccanica Piacenza	3–0 (25–16, 25–13, 25–17)	Volley Bergamo
2015	Igor Gorgonzola Novara	3–1 (25–19, 28–30, 30–28, 25–23)	Liu Jo Modena
2016	Foppapedretti Bergamo	3–0 (25–23, 27–25, 25–17)	Nordmeccanica Piacenza
2017	Imoco Volley Conegliano	3–0 (25–23, 25–22, 25–23)	Liu Jo Nordmeccanica Modena
2018	Igor Gorgonzola Novara	3–1 (25–17, 14–25, 25–21, 25–23)	Imoco Volley Conegliano
2019	Igor Gorgonzola Novara	3–2 (25–22, 20–25, 12–25, 25–22, 15–12)	Imoco Volley Conegliano
2020	Imoco Volley Conegliano	3–0 (25–20, 25–19, 25–16)	Unet E-Work Busto Arsizio
2021	Imoco Volley Conegliano	3–1 (25–17, 25–23, 22–25, 25–18)	Igor Gorgonzola Novara
2022	Imoco Volley Conegliano	3–2 (19–25, 19–25, 25–21, 25–22, 15–13)	Igor Gorgonzola Novara
2023	Imoco Volley Conegliano	3–0 (25–17, 25–23, 25–19)	Vero Volley Milano
2024	Imoco Volley Conegliano	3–2 (25–21, 22–25, 25–19, 19–25, 15–11)	Vero Volley Milano
2025	Imoco Volley Conegliano	3–0 (37–35, 25–20, 25–20)	Vero Volley Milano
2026	Imoco Volley Conegliano	3–0 (31–29, 26–24, 27–25)	Savino Del Bene Scandicci

== Honours by club ==
Rk.	Club	Titles	City	Years won
1	Imoco Volley	8	Conegliano	2017, 2020, 2021, 2022, 2023, 2024, 2025, 2026
2	Teodora Ravenna	6	Ravenna	1980, 1981, 1984, 1985, 1987, 1991
=	Volley Bergamo	6	Bergamo	1996, 1997, 1998, 2006, 2008, 2016
4	Pallavolo Sirio Perugia	5	Perugia	1992, 1999, 2003, 2005, 2007
5	Pallavolo Reggio Emilia	4	Reggio Emilia	1982, 1983, 1986, 1989
6	Matera Volley	3	Matera	1993, 1994, 1995
=	AGIL Volley	3	Novara	2015, 2018, 2019
8	Virtus Reggio Calabria	2	Reggio Calabria	2000, 2001
=	Volley Modena	2	Modena	1990, 2002
=	GSO Villa Cortese	2	Villa Cortese	2010, 2011
=	River Volley Piacenza	2	Piacenza	2013, 2014
12	Alidea Catania	1	Catania	1979
=	Amatori Bari	1	Bari	1988
=	Asystel Novara	1	Novara	2004
=	Busto Arsizio Volley	1	Busto Arsizio	2012
