= Former Imoco Volley squads =

This article shows all past squads from the Italian professional volleyball team Imoco Volley from the Serie A1 League.

== 2025–26 ==
Season 2025–2026

Honours

- Club World Championship: 2
- CEV Champions League: 3
- Serie A1: 1
- Italian Cup: 1
- Italian Super Cup: 2

2025–2026 Team
Number	Player	Position	Height (m)	Birth date
1	(Brazil) Gabriela Guimarães	Outside Hitter	1.81	19 May 1994 (age 32)
4	(China) Zhu Ting	Outside Hitter	1.98	29 November 1994 (age 31)
5	(Italy) Serena Scognamillo	Libero	1.70	24 February 2001 (age 25)
6	(United States) Jenna Ewert	Setter	1.78	8 February 2000 (age 26)
9	(Italy) Marina Lubian	Middle Blocker	1.92	11 April 2000 (age 26)
10	(Italy) Monica De Gennaro	Libero	1.72	8 January 1987 (age 39)
11	(Sweden) Isabelle Haak	Opposite	1.94	11 July 1999 (age 26)
13	(Italy) Matilde Munarini	Middle Blocker	1.86	3 June 2004 (age 22)
14	(Poland) Joanna Wołosz (c)	Setter	1.81	7 April 1990 (age 36)
15	(Italy) Merit Adigwe	Opposite	1.83	24 August 2006 (age 19)
16	(Netherlands) Nika Daalderop	Outside Hitter	1.90	29 November 1998 (age 27)
18	(Italy) Cristina Chirichella	Middle Blocker	1.95	10 February 1994 (age 32)
19	(Italy) Sarah Fahr	Middle Blocker	1.94	12 September 2001 (age 24)
23	(Slovenia) Fatoumatta Sillah	Outside Hitter	1.86	15 November 2002 (age 23)

== 2024–25 ==
Season 2024–2025

Honours

- Club World Championship: 1
- CEV Champions League: 1
- Serie A1: 1
- Italian Cup: 1
- Italian Super Cup: 1

2024–2025 Team
Number	Player	Position	Height (m)	Weight (kg)	Birth date
1	(Brazil) Gabriela Guimarães	Outside Hitter	1.81		19 May 1994 (age 32)
4	(China) Zhu Ting	Outside Hitter	1.98		29 November 1994 (age 31)
6	(Japan) Nanami Seki	Setter	1.71		12 June 1999 (age 27)
7	(Italy) Katja Eckl	Middle Blocker	1.88		6 May 2003 (age 23)
9	(Italy) Marina Lubian	Middle Blocker	1.92	74	11 April 2000 (age 26)
10	(Italy) Monica De Gennaro	Libero	1.72	63	8 January 1987 (age 39)
11	(Sweden) Isabelle Haak	Opposite	1.94	83	11 July 1999 (age 26)
14	(Poland) Joanna Wołosz (c)	Setter	1.81	65	7 April 1990 (age 36)
15	(Italy) Merit Adigwe	Opposite	1.83		24 August 2006 (age 19)
16	(United States) Khalia Lanier	Outside Hitter	1.86		19 September 1998 (age 27)
17	(Poland) Martyna Łukasik	Outside Hitter	1.90		26 November 1999 (age 26)
18	(Italy) Cristina Chirichella	Middle Blocker	1.95		10 February 1994 (age 32)
19	(Italy) Sarah Fahr	Middle Blocker	1.94	84	12 September 2001 (age 24)
20	(Italy) Anna Bardaro	Libero	1.72		29 April 2005 (age 21)

== 2023–24 ==
Season 2023–2024

Honours

- CEV Champions League: 1
- Serie A1: 1
- Italian Cup: 1
- Italian Super Cup: 1

2023–2024 Team
Number	Player	Position	Height (m)	Weight (kg)	Birth date
1	(Italy) Vittoria Piani	Opposite	1.87		12 February 1998 (age 28)
2	(United States) Kathryn Plummer	Outside Hitter	1.97	88	16 October 1998 (age 27)
3	(United States) Kelsey Robinson-Cook	Outside Hitter	1.88	75	25 June 1992 (age 34)
4	(Italy) Federica Squarcini	Middle Blocker	1.83	67	24 September 2000 (age 25)
5	(Netherlands) Robin de Kruijf	Middle Blocker	1.93	79	5 May 1991 (age 35)
6	(Italy) Alessia Gennari	Outside Hitter	1.84	70	3 November 1991 (age 34)
9	(Italy) Marina Lubian	Middle Blocker	1.92	74	11 April 2000 (age 26)
10	(Italy) Monica De Gennaro	Libero	1.72	63	8 January 1987 (age 39)
11	(Sweden) Isabelle Haak	Opposite	1.94	83	11 July 1999 (age 26)
12	(United States) Madison Bugg	Setter	1.83		4 August 1994 (age 31)
14	(Poland) Joanna Wołosz (c)	Setter	1.81	65	7 April 1990 (age 36)
16	(United States) Khalia Lanier	Outside Hitter	1.86		19 September 1998 (age 27)
19	(Italy) Sarah Fahr	Middle Blocker	1.94	84	12 September 2001 (age 24)
20	(Italy) Anna Bardaro	Libero	1.72		29 April 2005 (age 21)

== 2022–23 ==
Season 2022–2023

Honours

- Club World Championship: 1
- CEV Champions League: 5
- Serie A1: 1
- Italian Cup: 1
- Italian Super Cup: 1

2022–2023 Team
Number	Player	Position	Height (m)	Weight (kg)	Birth date
1	(Italy) Roberta Carraro	Setter	1.81	68	17 November 1998 (age 27)
2	(United States) Kathryn Plummer	Outside Hitter	1.97	88	16 October 1998 (age 27)
3	(United States) Kelsey Robinson-Cook	Outside Hitter	1.88	75	25 June 1992 (age 34)
4	(Italy) Federica Squarcini	Middle Blocker	1.83	67	24 September 2000 (age 25)
5	(Netherlands) Robin de Kruijf	Middle Blocker	1.93	79	5 May 1991 (age 35)
6	(Italy) Alessia Gennari	Outside Hitter	1.84	70	3 November 1991 (age 34)
7	(United States) Stephanie Samedy	Opposite	1.88		27 September 1998 (age 27)
8	(Canada) Alexa Gray	Outside Hitter	1.85	75	7 August 1994 (age 31)
9	(Italy) Marina Lubian	Middle Blocker	1.92	74	11 April 2000 (age 26)
10	(Italy) Monica De Gennaro	Libero	1.72	63	8 January 1987 (age 39)
11	(Sweden) Isabelle Haak	Opposite	1.94	83	11 July 1999 (age 26)
12	(Italy) Ylenia Pericati	Libero	1.74		22 March 1994 (age 32)
13	(Italy) Eleonora Furlan	Middle Blocker	1.88	77	10 March 1995 (age 31)
14	(Poland) Joanna Wołosz (c)	Setter	1.81	65	7 April 1990 (age 36)
19	(Italy) Sarah Fahr	Middle Blocker	1.94	84	12 September 2001 (age 24)
20	(Italy) Anna Bardaro	Libero	1.72		29 April 2005 (age 21)

== 2021–22 ==
Season 2021–2022

Honours

- Club World Championship: 2
- CEV Champions League: 2
- Serie A1: 1
- Italian Cup: 1
- Italian Super Cup: 1

2021–2022 Team
Number	Player	Position	Height (m)	Weight (kg)	Birth date
1	(Italy) Lara Caravello	Libero	1.76		4 May 1994 (age 32)
2	(United States) Kathryn Plummer	Outside Hitter	1.97	88	16 October 1998 (age 27)
3	(United States) Megan Courtney-Lush	Outside Hitter	1.85	61	27 October 1993 (age 32)
4	(Croatia) Božana Butigan	Middle Blocker	1.90	78	19 August 2000 (age 25)
5	(Netherlands) Robin de Kruijf	Middle Blocker	1.93	79	5 May 1991 (age 35)
7	(Italy) Raphaela Folie	Middle Blocker	1.85	69	7 March 1991 (age 35)
8	(Italy) Matilde Munarini	Middle Blocker	1.87		3 June 2004 (age 22)
9	(Italy) Loveth Omoruyi	Outside Hitter	1.84	75	25 August 2002 (age 23)
10	(Italy) Monica De Gennaro	Libero	1.72	63	8 January 1987 (age 39)
11	(Bulgaria) Hristina Vuchkova	Middle Blocker	1.92	75	1 October 1991 (age 34)
12	(Italy) Giorgia Frosini	Opposite	1.89	75	29 November 2002 (age 23)
13	(Italy) Giulia Gennari	Setter	1.84	63	23 June 1996 (age 30)
14	(Poland) Joanna Wołosz (c)	Setter	1.81	65	7 April 1990 (age 36)
17	(Italy) Miriam Sylla	Outside Hitter	1.84	80	1 August 1995 (age 30)
18	(Italy) Paola Egonu	Opposite	1.93	79	18 December 1998 (age 27)
19	(Italy) Sarah Fahr	Middle Blocker	1.94	84	12 September 2001 (age 24)
20	(Italy) Anna Bardaro	Libero	1.72		29 April 2005 (age 21)

== 2020–21 ==
Season 2020–2021

Honours

- CEV Champions League: 1
- Serie A1: 1
- Italian Cup: 1
- Italian Super Cup: 1

2020–2021 Team
Number	Player	Position	Height (m)	Weight (kg)	Birth date
1	(Italy) Lara Caravello	Libero	1.76		4 May 1994 (age 32)
2	(Italy) Katja Eckl	Middle Blocker	1.87		1 January 2003 (age 23)
3	(France) Lucille Gicquel	Opposite	1.89	69	13 November 1997 (age 28)
4	(Croatia) Božana Butigan	Middle Blocker	1.90	78	19 August 2000 (age 25)
5	(Netherlands) Robin de Kruijf	Middle Blocker	1.93	79	5 May 1991 (age 35)
7	(Italy) Raphaela Folie	Middle Blocker	1.85	69	7 March 1991 (age 35)
9	(Italy) Loveth Omoruyi	Outside Hitter	1.84	75	25 August 2002 (age 23)
10	(Italy) Monica De Gennaro	Libero	1.72	63	8 January 1987 (age 39)
11	(United States) McKenzie Adams	Outside Hitter	1.92		13 February 1992 (age 34)
13	(Italy) Giulia Gennari	Setter	1.84	63	23 June 1996 (age 30)
14	(Poland) Joanna Wołosz (c)	Setter	1.81	65	7 April 1990 (age 36)
15	(United States) Kimberly Hill	Outside Hitter	1.93	68	30 November 1989 (age 36)
17	(Italy) Miriam Sylla	Outside Hitter	1.84	80	1 August 1995 (age 30)
18	(Italy) Paola Egonu	Opposite	1.93	79	18 December 1998 (age 27)
19	(Italy) Sarah Fahr	Middle Blocker	1.94	84	12 September 2001 (age 24)
22	(Italy) Gaia Natalizia	Libero	1.66		8 March 2003 (age 23)

== 2019–20 ==
Season 2019–2020

Honours

- Club World Championship: 1
- CEV Champions League: Cancelled
- Serie A1: Cancelled
- Italian Cup: 1
- Italian Super Cup: 1

2019–2020 Team
Number	Player	Position	Height (m)	Weight (kg)	Birth date
1	(Italy) Indre Sorokaite	Opposite	1.86	81	2 July 1988 (age 38)
2	(Italy) Margherita Brandi	Middle Blocker	1.81		18 October 2002 (age 23)
5	(Netherlands) Robin de Kruijf	Middle Blocker	1.93	79	5 May 1991 (age 35)
6	(Germany) Jennifer Geerties	Outside Hitter	1.86	56	5 April 1994 (age 32)
7	(Italy) Raphaela Folie	Middle Blocker	1.85	69	7 March 1991 (age 35)
8	(Italy) Eleonora Fersino	Libero	1.69	60	24 January 2000 (age 26)
9	(Italy) Alexandra Botezat	Middle Blocker	1.96	75	3 August 1998 (age 27)
10	(Italy) Monica De Gennaro	Libero	1.72	63	8 January 1987 (age 39)
11	(United States) Chiaka Ogbogu	Middle Blocker	1.89	73	15 April 1995 (age 31)
12	(Italy) Terry Enweonwu	Opposite	1.86	86	12 May 2000 (age 26)
13	(Italy) Giulia Gennari	Setter	1.84	63	23 June 1996 (age 30)
14	(Poland) Joanna Wołosz (c)	Setter	1.81	65	7 April 1990 (age 36)
15	(United States) Kimberly Hill	Outside Hitter	1.93	68	30 November 1989 (age 36)
17	(Italy) Miriam Sylla	Outside Hitter	1.84	80	1 August 1995 (age 30)
18	(Italy) Paola Egonu	Opposite	1.93	79	18 December 1998 (age 27)

== 2018–19 ==
Season 2018–2019

Honours

- CEV Champions League: 2
- Serie A1: 1
- Italian Cup: 2
- Italian Super Cup: 1

2018–2019 Team
Number	Player	Position	Height (m)	Weight (kg)	Birth date
1	(Japan) Miyu Nagaoka	Opposite	1.80	65	25 July 1991 (age 34)
3	(Italy) Marta Bechis	Setter	1.81	68	4 September 1989 (age 36)
4	(United States) Megan Easy	Outside Hitter	1.91	80	15 October 1988 (age 37)
5	(Netherlands) Robin de Kruijf	Middle Blocker	1.93	79	5 May 1991 (age 35)
6	(Argentina) Elina Maria Rodríguez	Outside Hitter	1.89	79	11 February 1997 (age 29)
7	(Italy) Raphaela Folie	Middle Blocker	1.85	69	7 March 1991 (age 35)
8	(Italy) Eleonora Fersino	Libero	1.69	60	24 January 2000 (age 26)
9	(United States) Karsta Lowe	Opposite	1.96	75	2 February 1993 (age 33)
10	(Italy) Monica De Gennaro	Libero	1.72	63	8 January 1987 (age 39)
11	(Italy) Anna Danesi	Middle Blocker	1.95	77	20 April 1996 (age 30)
12	(Croatia) Martina Šamadan	Middle Blocker	1.93	74	9 November 1993 (age 32)
13	(Croatia) Samanta Fabris	Opposite	1.88	79	8 February 1992 (age 34)
14	(Poland) Joanna Wołosz (c)	Setter	1.81	65	7 April 1990 (age 36)
15	(United States) Kimberly Hill	Outside Hitter	1.93	68	30 November 1989 (age 36)
16	(Italy) Valentina Tirozzi	Outside Hitter	1.80	69	26 March 1986 (age 40)
17	(Italy) Miriam Sylla	Outside Hitter	1.84	80	1 August 1995 (age 30)
18	(Italy) Gaia Moretto	Middle Blocker	1.92	74	19 September 1994 (age 31)

== 2017–18 ==
Season 2017–2018

Honours

- CEV Champions League: 3
- Serie A1: 1
- Italian Cup: 2
- Italian Super Cup: 2

2017–2018 Team
Number	Player	Position	Height (m)	Weight (kg)	Birth date
2	(Mexico) Samantha Bricio	Outside Hitter	1.88	58	22 November 1994 (age 31)
3	(Italy) Silvia Fiori	Libero	1.62	60	18 July 1994 (age 31)
4	(United States) Simone Lee	Outside Hitter	1.88	70	7 October 1996 (age 29)
5	(Netherlands) Robin de Kruijf	Middle Blocker	1.93	79	5 May 1991 (age 35)
6	(Italy) Elisa Cella	Outside Hitter	1.86	72	4 June 1982 (age 44)
7	(Italy) Raphaela Folie	Middle Blocker	1.85	69	7 March 1991 (age 35)
8	(United States) Megan Easy	Outside Hitter	1.91	80	15 October 1988 (age 37)
9	(Italy) Laura Melandri	Middle Blocker	1.86	60	31 January 1995 (age 31)
10	(Italy) Monica De Gennaro	Libero	1.72	63	8 January 1987 (age 39)
11	(Italy) Anna Danesi	Middle Blocker	1.95	77	20 April 1996 (age 30)
12	(Greece) Athina Papafotiou	Setter	1.81		23 August 1989 (age 36)
13	(Croatia) Samanta Fabris	Opposite	1.88	79	8 February 1992 (age 34)
14	(Poland) Joanna Wołosz (c)	Setter	1.81	65	7 April 1990 (age 36)
15	(United States) Kimberly Hill	Outside Hitter	1.93	68	30 November 1989 (age 36)
16	(Italy) Anna Nicoletti	Opposite	1.93	86	3 January 1996 (age 30)
18	(Italy) Marta Bechis	Setter	1.81	68	4 September 1989 (age 36)

== 2016–17 ==
Season 2016–2017

Honours

- CEV Champions League: 2
- Serie A1: 3
- Italian Cup: 1
- Italian Super Cup: 1

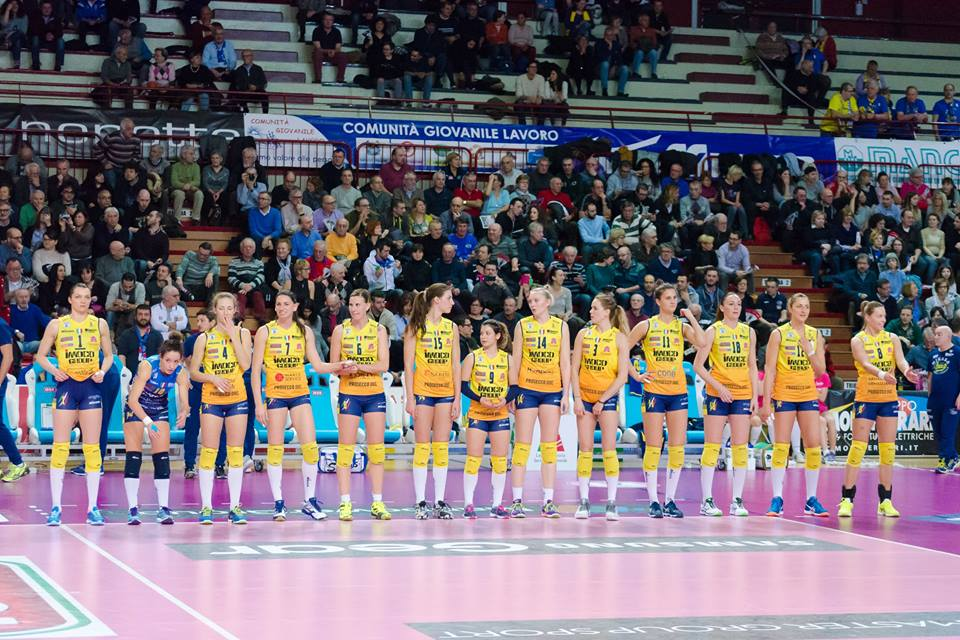

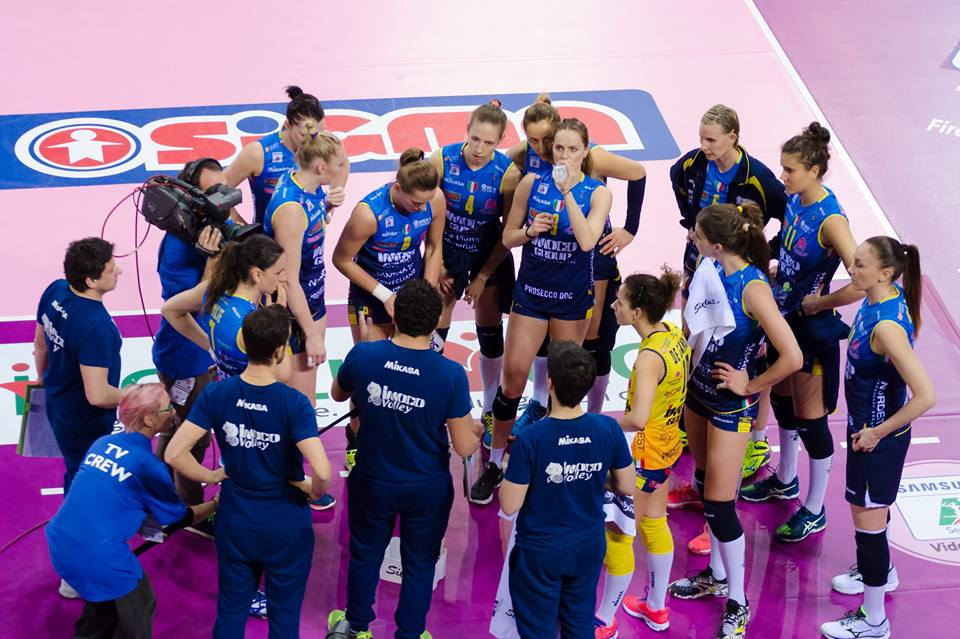
Imoco Volley Conegliano 2016-2017

2016–2017 Team
Number	Player	Position	Height (m)	Weight (kg)	Birth date
1	(Italy) Serena Ortolani (c)	Spiker	1.87	70	7 January 1987 (age 39)
2	(Mexico) Samantha Bricio	Spiker	1.88	58	22 November 1994 (age 31)
3	(United States) Kelsey Robinson	Spiker	1.88	75	25 June 1992 (age 34)
4	(Italy) Ofelia Malinov	Setter	1.74	67	29 February 1996 (age 30)
6	(Italy) Elisa Cella	Spiker	1.86	72	4 June 1982 (age 44)
7	(Italy) Raphaela Folie	Middle Blocker	1.85	69	7 March 1991 (age 35)
8	(Poland) Katarzyna Skorupa	Setter	1.83	73	16 September 1984 (age 41)
9	(Italy) Silvia Fiori	Libero	1.62	60	18 July 1994 (age 31)
10	(Italy) Monica De Gennaro	Libero	1.72	62	8 January 1987 (age 39)
11	(Italy) Anna Danesi	Middle Blocker	1.95	77	20 April 1996 (age 30)
12	(Italy) Carolina Costagrande	Spiker	1.89	87	15 October 1980 (age 45)
14	(United States) Nicole Fawcett	Opposite	1.91	82	16 December 1986 (age 39)
15	(Netherlands) Robin de Kruijf	Middle Blocker	1.93	79	5 May 1991 (age 35)
18	(Italy) Jenny Barazza	Middle Blocker	1.88	70	24 July 1981 (age 44)

== 2015–16 ==
Season 2015–2016

Honours

- Serie A1: 1
- Italian Cup: 5

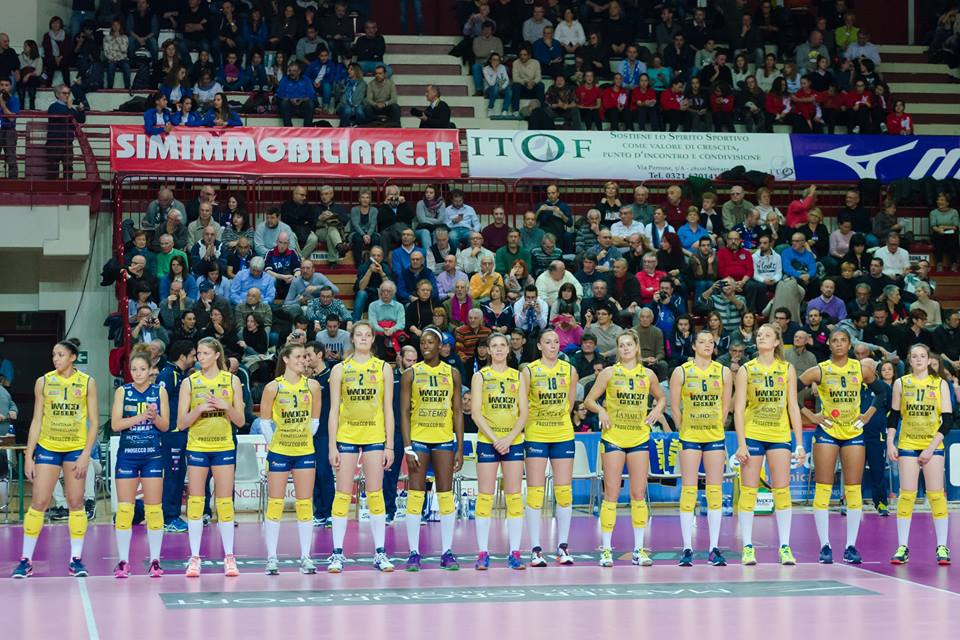
Imoco Volley Conegliano 2015-2016

2015–2016 Team
Number	Player	Position	Height (m)	Weight (kg)	Birth date
1	(United States) Alisha Glass	Setter	1.84	72	5 April 1988 (age 38)
2	(Greece) Anthí Vasilantonáki	Opposite	1.96	80	9 April 1996 (age 30)
3	(Italy) Marta Bechis	Setter	1.81	68	4 September 1989 (age 36)
5	(Italy) Valentina Serena	Setter	1.84	70	10 November 1981 (age 44)
6	(Italy) Serena Ortolani	Opposite	1.87	67	7 January 1987 (age 39)
7	(Italy) Alice Santini	Outside Hitter	1.81	68	16 January 1984 (age 42)
8	(United States) Rachael Adams	Middle Blocker	1.88	84	3 June 1990 (age 36)
9	(United States) Kelsey Robinson	Outside Hitter	1.88	75	25 June 1992 (age 34)
10	(Italy) Monica De Gennaro	Libero	1.73	71	8 January 1987 (age 39)
11	(United States) Megan Easy	Outside Hitter	1.91	80	15 October 1988 (age 37)
12	(Serbia) Jovana Brakočević	Opposite	1.96	82	5 May 1988 (age 38)
13	(Italy) Valentina Arrighetti (c)	Middle Blocker	1.89	73	26 January 1985 (age 41)
14	(Italy) Lucia Crisanti	Middle Blocker	1.87	70	16 March 1986 (age 40)
15	(Italy) Anna Nicoletti	Opposite	1.90	77	3 January 1996 (age 30)
17	(Italy) Chiara De Bortoli	Libero	1.70	60	28 July 1997 (age 28)
18	(Italy) Jenny Barazza	Middle Blocker	1.88	77	24 July 1981 (age 44)

== 2014–15 ==
Season 2014–2015

Honours

- CEV Cup: 9
- Serie A1: 4
- Italian Cup: 3

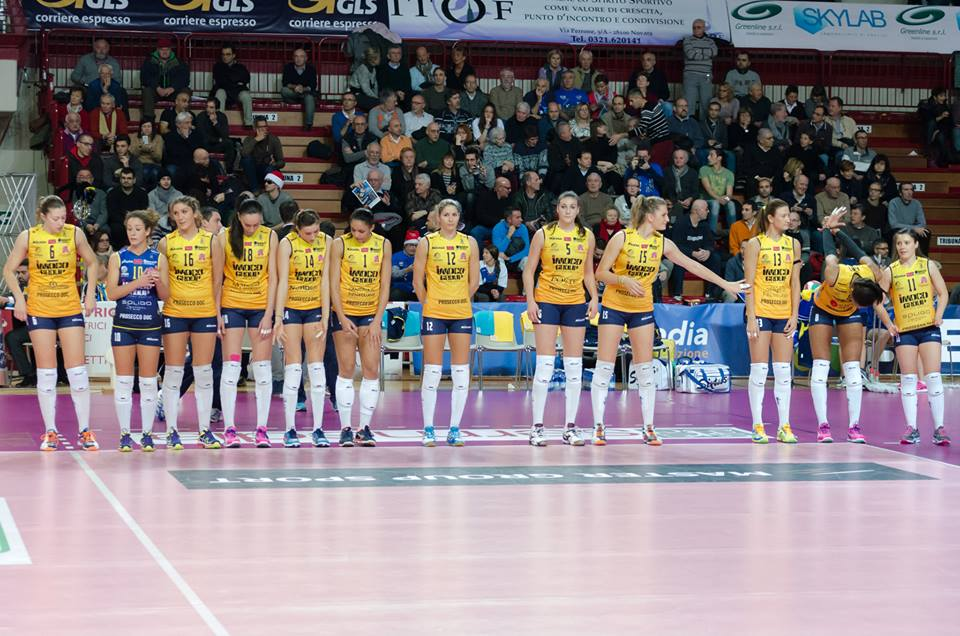

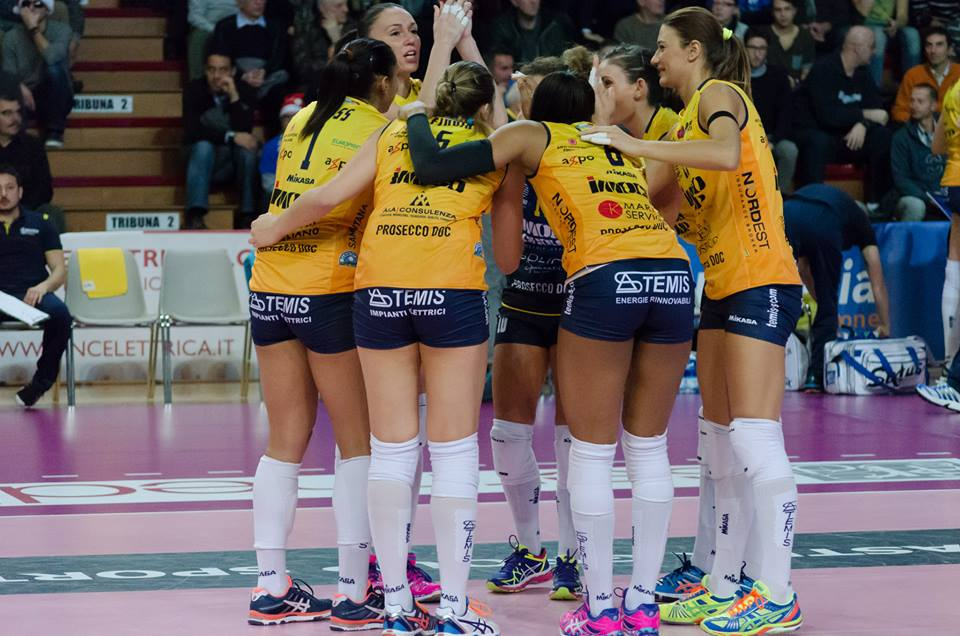
Imoco Volley Conegliano 2014-2015

2014–2015 Team
Number	Player	Position	Height (m)	Weight (kg)	Birth date
1	(United States) Alisha Glass	Setter	1.84	72	5 April 1988 (age 38)
2	(Greece) Anthí Vasilantonáki	Opposite	1.96	80	9 April 1996 (age 30)
3	(United States) Micha Hancock	Setter	1.77	68	10 November 1992 (age 33)
5	(Italy) Eleonora Furlan	Middle Blocker	1.88	81	10 March 1995 (age 31)
6	(Italy) Valentina Fiorin (c)	Outside Hitter	1.87	69	9 October 1984 (age 41)
8	(United States) Rachael Adams	Middle Blocker	1.88	84	3 June 1990 (age 36)
9	(Italy) Sofia Arimattei	Outside Hitter	1.86	74	17 January 1981 (age 45)
10	(Italy) Monica De Gennaro	Libero	1.73	71	8 January 1987 (age 39)
11	(Italy) Martina Boscoscuro	Libero	1.65	64	2 September 1988 (age 37)
12	(Croatia) Marina Katić	Setter	1.83	84	1 October 1981 (age 44)
13	(Turkey) Neriman Özsoy	Outside Hitter	1.88	73	13 July 1988 (age 37)
14	(Bulgaria) Emiliya Nikolova	Opposite	1.87	70	26 December 1991 (age 34)
15	(Italy) Anna Nicoletti	Opposite	1.90	77	3 January 1996 (age 30)
16	(Italy) Cristina Barcellini	Outside Hitter	1.83	78	20 November 1986 (age 39)
18	(Italy) Jenny Barazza	Middle Blocker	1.88	77	24 July 1981 (age 44)

== 2013–14 ==
Season 2013–2014

Honours

- CEV Champions League: 8
- Serie A1: 2
- Italian Cup: 5
- Italian Super Cup: 2

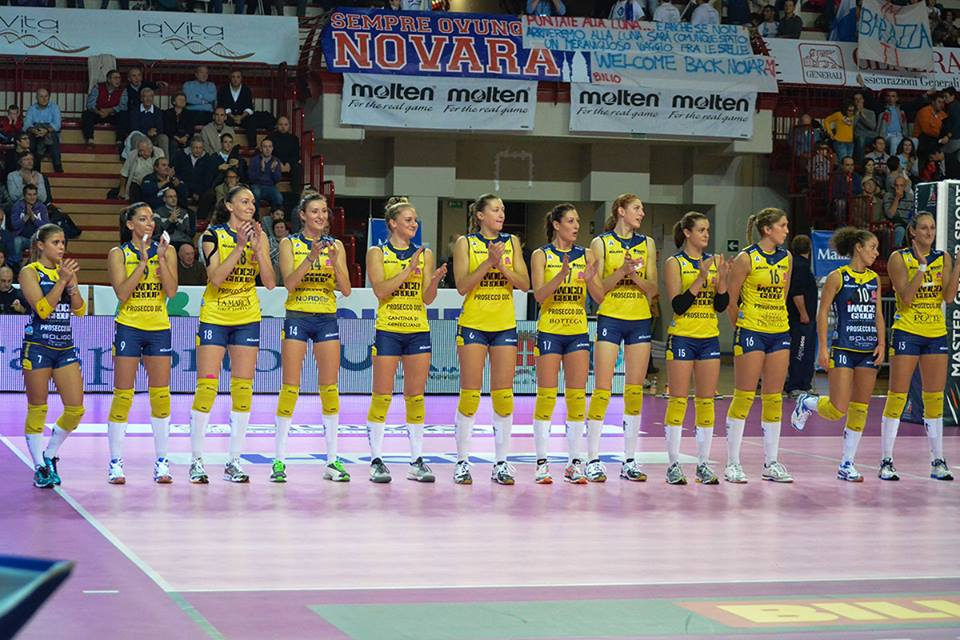

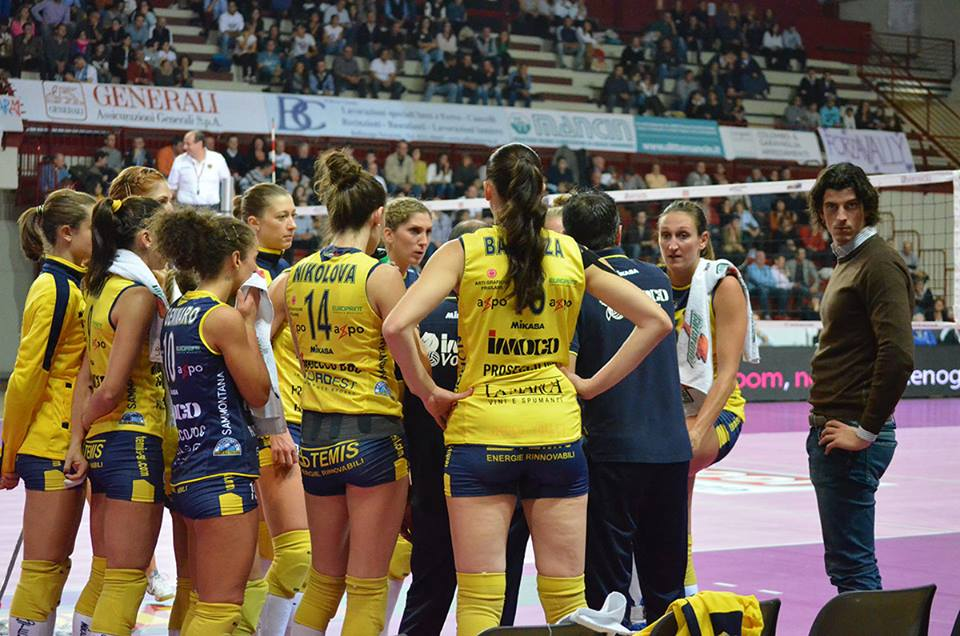
Imoco Volley Conegliano 2013-2014

2013–2014 Team
Number	Player	Position	Height (m)	Weight (kg)	Birth date
3	(United States) Carli Lloyd	Setter	1.80	75	6 August 1989 (age 36)
5	(United States) Lauren Gibbemeyer	Middle Blocker	1.87	71	8 September 1989 (age 36)
6	(Italy) Valentina Fiorin	Outside Hitter	1.87	69	9 October 1984 (age 41)
7	(Italy) Carlotta Daminato	Libero	1.60	57	2 May 1993 (age 33)
8	(Germany) Berit Kauffeldt	Middle Blocker	1.90	75	8 July 1990 (age 35)
9	(Italy) Melissa Donà	Outside Hitter	1.80	73	11 April 1982 (age 44)
10	(Italy) Monica De Gennaro	Libero	1.73	71	8 January 1987 (age 39)
12	(Italy) Alice Scodellaro	Libero	1.70	55	3 April 1989 (age 37)
13	(Italy) Raffaella Calloni (c)	Middle Blocker	1.87	74	4 May 1983 (age 43)
14	(Bulgaria) Emiliya Nikolova	Opposite	1.87	70	26 December 1991 (age 34)
15	(Italy) Marta Bechis	Setter	1.81	59	4 September 1989 (age 36)
16	(Italy) Cristina Barcellini	Outside Hitter	1.83	78	20 November 1986 (age 39)
17	(Italy) Valentina Tirozzi	Outside Hitter	1.83	72	26 March 1986 (age 40)
18	(Italy) Jenny Barazza	Middle Blocker	1.88	77	24 July 1981 (age 44)

== 2012–13 ==
Season 2012–2013

Honours

- Serie A1: 2
- Italian Cup: 5

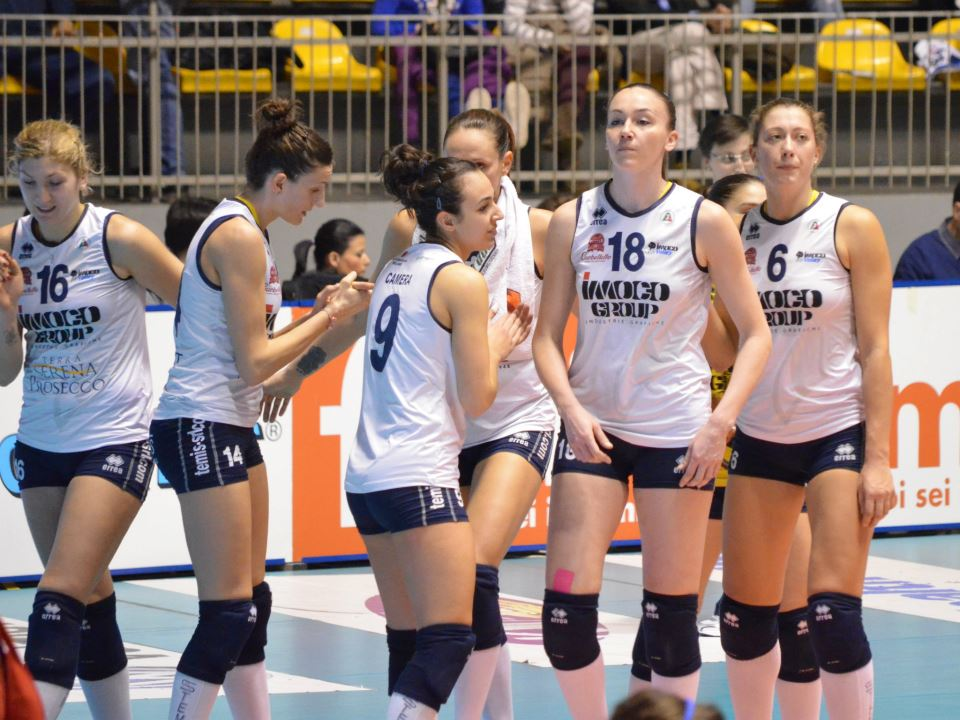

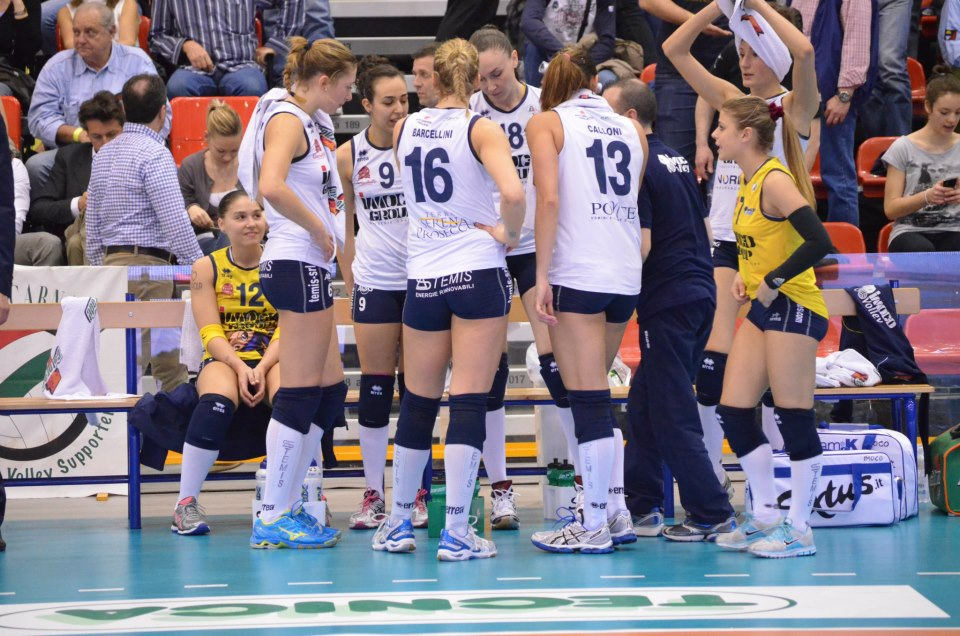
Imoco Volley Conegliano 2012-2013

2012–2013 Team
Number	Player	Position	Height (m)	Weight (kg)	Birth date
2	(Italy) Giulia Agostinetto	Setter	1.79		2 October 1987 (age 38)
5	(Italy) Ilaria Maruotti	Outside Hitter	1.82	62	22 February 1994 (age 32)
6	(Italy) Valentina Fiorin	Outside Hitter	1.87	69	9 October 1984 (age 41)
7	(Italy) Carlotta Daminato	Libero	1.60	57	2 May 1993 (age 33)
8	(Poland) Zuzanna Efimienko-Młotkowska	Middle Blocker	1.92	78	8 August 1989 (age 36)
9	(Italy) Letizia Camera	Setter	1.75	70	1 October 1992 (age 33)
10	(Italy) Carlotta Zanotto	Outside Hitter	1.81		1 July 1993 (age 33)
12	(Italy) Carla Rossetto	Libero	1.68		20 December 1984 (age 41)
13	(Italy) Raffaella Calloni (c)	Middle Blocker	1.87	74	4 May 1983 (age 43)
14	(Bulgaria) Emiliya Nikolova	Opposite	1.87	70	26 December 1991 (age 34)
15	(Italy) Alessandra Crozzolin	Middle Blocker	1.86		8 December 1977 (age 48)
16	(Italy) Cristina Barcellini	Outside Hitter	1.83	78	20 November 1986 (age 39)
18	(Italy) Jenny Barazza	Middle Blocker	1.88	77	24 July 1981 (age 44)
