= Imoco Volley =

Italian women's volleyball club

- Full name: Imoco Volley Conegliano
- Short name: Imoco
- Nickname: Pantere (Panthers)
- Founded: 2012
- Ground: PalaVerde, Treviso, Italy (Capacity: 5,344)
- Chairman: (Italy) Piero Garbellotto
- Head coach: (Italy) Daniele Santarelli
- Captain: (Poland) Joanna Wołosz
- League: Serie A1
- 2025–26: (gold) 1st
- Website: Club home page
- Championships: Club World Championship CEV Champions League Serie A1 Italian Cup Italian Super Cup

Uniforms
Home	Away

Imoco Volley is an Italian professional women's volleyball club based in Conegliano in Northern Italy and currently playing in the Serie A1. On the global stage, the team was crowned champion of the FIVB Volleyball Women's Club World Championship three times (2019, 2022, 2024) and secured three continental Women's CEV Champions League (2021, 2024, 2025), the European league.

== History ==
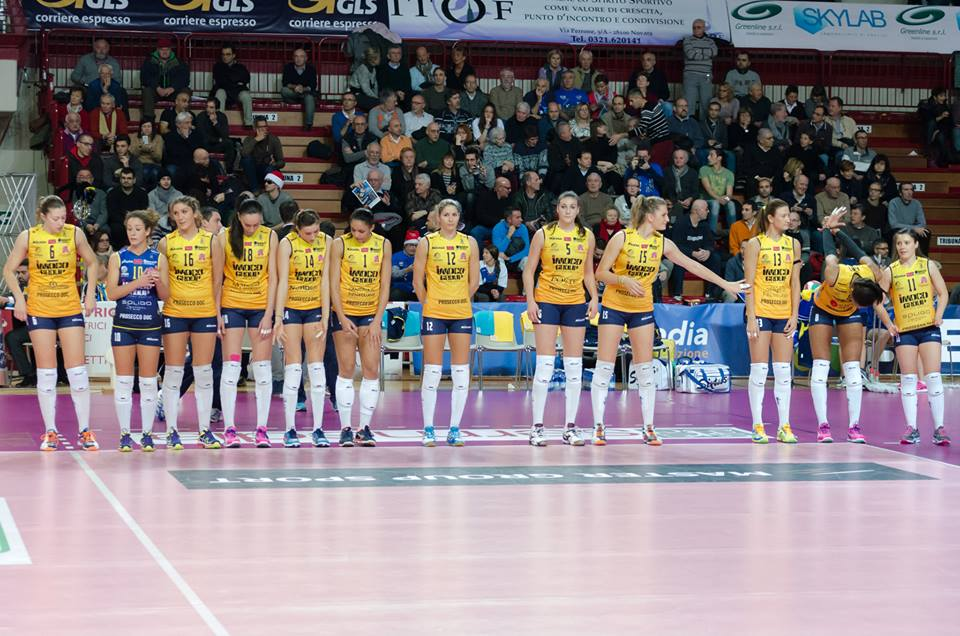
2014-2015 Imoco Volley Conegliano

The club was founded on 15 March 2012, two months after the bankruptcy of Spes Volley the other volleyball team in Conegliano. In April 2012, it acquired a Serie A1 licence from Parma Volley Girls, that meant the club started playing directly at the highest Italian league. It has been playing under the name Imoco Volley Conegliano since its foundation in 2012.

The club won the Serie A1 for the first time in 2015–16, winning the Italian Super Cup a few months later on 8 December 2016.

On 5 March 2017, the club won the Coppa Italia for the first time after beating Liu Jo Nordmeccanica Modena 3–0 in the final.

In December 2019 the club won the Women's Club World Championship.

In 2020, the Imoco Volley won its second Coppa Italia. Due to the coronavirus pandemic, both the Serie A1 and the CEV Champions League were untimely cancelled. The Imoco Volley, with its new name A. Carraro Imoco Conegliano, reached, along with the VakıfBank, the semi-finals of the CEV Champions League after winning all its matches, but it could not play them; it was declared winner of the regular season of the Serie A1, but no team was declared winner of the 2019-20 Italian championship. It ended the 2019–20 season by winning three of its five goals: the Italian Supercup, the Women's Club World Championship in Shaoxing and the Coppa Italia.

All the starting seven of the club decided to renew their contracts for the 2020–21 season, after their wins in the previous season and the cancellation of the finals of the Serie A1 and the CEV Champions League (the only major title never won by the club). More than half of the current players of the Imoco Volley are part of the starting seven of the Italian national team, runner-up at the 2018 World Championship. The others are champions such as the Dutch Robin de Kruijf, the Polish setter Joanna Wołosz and the American Kimberly Hill. The club renewed all the other players excepting Giulia Gennari, according to its policy to have many young new talents along with top players of the volleyball. The new team has three players who are under the age of 20 years, one has less than 18 years, the Italian Loveth Omoruyi. Sarah Fahr, who is not part of the starting roster, has already won a silver medal at the 2018 World Championship and a bronze medal at the 2019 European Championship with the Italian national team.

== Previous names ==
Due to sponsorship, the club have competed under the following names:

Period	Previous names in Serie A1	Previous names in CEV competitions
2012–2013	Imoco Volley Conegliano	–
2013–2015	Prosecco Doc-Imoco Conegliano	Prosecco Doc-Imoco Conegliano
2015–2016	Imoco Volley Conegliano	–
2016–2019	Imoco Volley Conegliano	Imoco Volley Conegliano
2019–2021	Imoco Volley Conegliano	A. Carraro Imoco Conegliano
2021–2025	Prosecco Doc Imoco Conegliano	A. Carraro Imoco Conegliano
2025–	Prosecco Doc A.Carraro Imoco Conegliano	A. Carraro Prosecco Doc Conegliano

== Team ==
All Roster player's of last Season ⤴

Season 2026–2027

2026–2027 Team
Number	Player	Position	Height (m)	Birth date
1	(Brazil) Gabriela Guimarães	Outside Hitter	1.81	19 May 1994 (age 32)
4	(China) Zhu Ting	Outside Hitter	1.98	29 November 1994 (age 31)
5	(Italy) Linda Manfredini	Middle Blocker	1.86	14 May 2006 (age 20)
7	(Italy) Raphaela Folie	Middle Blocker	1.86	7 March 1991 (age 35)
8	(Italy) Anna Piovesan	Outside Hitter	1.88	27 March 2004 (age 22)
10	(Italy) Monica De Gennaro	Libero	1.72	8 January 1987 (age 39)
11	(Sweden) Isabelle Haak	Opposite	1.94	11 July 1999 (age 27)
12	(China) Yao Di	Setter	1.82	15 August 1992 (age 34)
13	(Italy) Elena Arici	Libero	1.70	7 August 2007 (age 19)
14	(Poland) Joanna Wołosz (c)	Setter	1.81	7 April 1990 (age 36)
15	(Italy) Merit Adigwe	Opposite	1.83	24 August 2006 (age 20)
16	(Germany) Anastasia Cekulaev	Middle Blocker	1.91	1 July 2003 (age 23)
19	(Italy) Sarah Fahr	Middle Blocker	1.94	12 September 2001 (age 25)
23	(Slovenia) Fatoumatta Sillah	Outside Hitter	1.86	15 November 2002 (age 23)

== Current coaching staff ==
Italy	Daniele Santarelli	8 June 1981 (age 45)	Head coach
Italy	Maurizio Mora	10 December 1980 (age 45)	Assistant coach
Italy	Vincenzo Mallia		Assistant
Italy	Giulio Bottosso		Assistant
Italy	Marco Greco		Scouting
Italy	Marco Da Lozzo		Athletic trainer
Italy	Pierpaolo Zanasi		Team manager

== Head coaches ==
Period	Head Coaches
2012–2014	(Italy) Marco Gaspari
2014–2015	(Italy) Nicola Negro (Italy) Alessandro Chiappini
2015–2017	(Italy) Davide Mazzanti
2017–	(Italy) Daniele Santarelli

== Team Captains ==
Period	Captain
2012–2014	(Italy) Raffaella Calloni
2014–2015	(Italy) Valentina Fiorin
2015–2016	(Italy) Valentina Arrighetti
2016–2017	(Italy) Serena Ortolani
2017–	(Poland) Joanna Wołosz

== Kit providers ==
The table below shows the history of kit providers for the Imoco Volley.

Period	Kit provider
2012–2013	Erreà
2013–2019	Mikasa
2019–	Joma

== Stadium and locations ==
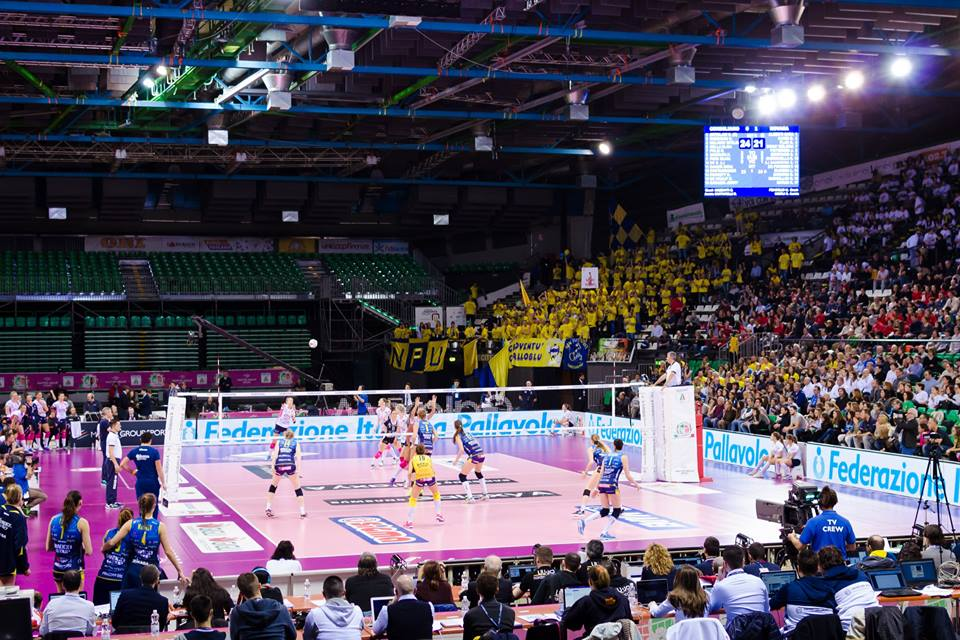
Palaverde

Location	Stadium	Capacity	Period
Treviso	Palaverde	5,344	2012–

== Position Main ==
Imoco Volley Line up
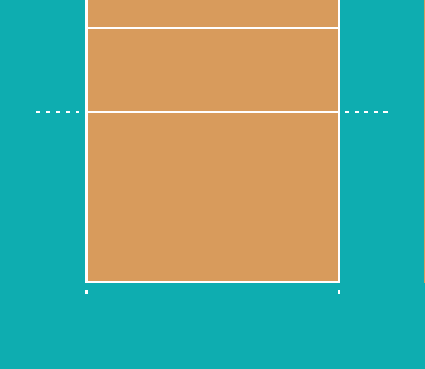

== Titles and honours ==
=== International competitions ===
- FIVB Volleyball Women's Club World Championship
  - Champions (3x): 2019, 2022, 2024
- Women's CEV Champions League
  - Champions (3x): 2020-21, 2023-24, 2024-25

=== Domestic competitions ===
- Serie A1
  - Champions (9x): 2015–16, 2017–18, 2018–19, 2020–21, 2021–22, 2022–23, 2023–24, 2024–25, 2025–26
- Italian Cup
  - Champions (8x): 2016–17, 2019–20, 2020–21, 2021–22, 2022–23, 2023–24, 2024–25, 2025–26
- Italian Super Cup
  - Champions (9x): 2016, 2018, 2019, 2020, 2021, 2022, 2023, 2024, 2026

== Current and former players ==
Domestic players

Italy

- Giulia Agostinetto (2012–2013)
- Letizia Camera (2012–2013)
- Alessandra Crozzolin (2012–2013)
- Ilaria Maruotti (2012–2013)
- Carla Rossetto (2012–2013)
- Carlotta Zanotto (2012–2013)
- Raffaella Calloni (2012–2014)
- Carlotta Daminato (2012–2014)
- Cristina Barcellini (2012–2015)
- Valentina Fiorin (2012–2015)
- Jenny Barazza (2012–2017)
- Melissa Donà (2013–2014)
- Alice Scodellaro (2013–2014)
- Marta Bechis (2013–2014, 2015–2016, 2017–2019)
- Valentina Tirozzi (2013–2014, 2018–2019)
- Sofia Arimattei (2014–2015)
- Martina Boscoscuro (2014–2015)
- Anna Nicoletti (2014–2016, 2017–2018)
- Eleonora Furlan (2014–2015, 2022)
- Valentina Arrighetti (2015–2016)
- Lucia Crisanti (2015–2016)
- Chiara De Bortoli (2015–2016)
- Alice Santini (2015–2016)
- Valentina Serena (2015–2016)
- Serena Ortolani (2015–2017)
- Carolina Costagrande (2016–2017)
- Ofelia Malinov (2016–2017)
- Elisa Cella (2016–2018)
- Silvia Fiori (2016–2018)
- Anna Danesi (2016–2019)
- Laura Melandri (2017–2018)
- Gaia Moretto (2018–2019)
- Eleonora Fersino (2018–2020)
- Miriam Sylla (2018–2022)
- Alexandra Botezat (2019–2020)
- Margherita Brandi (2019–2020)
- Terry Enweonwu (2019–2020)
- Indre Sorokaite (2019–2020)
- Paola Egonu (2019–2022)
- Giulia Gennari (2019–2022)
- Gaia Natalizia (2020–2021)
- Katja Eckl (2020–2021, 2024–2025)
- Lara Caravello (2020–2022)
- Loveth Omoruyi (2020–2022)
- Giorgia Frosini (2021–2022)
- Roberta Carraro (2022–2023)
- Ylenia Pericati (2022–2023)
- Alessia Gennari (2022–2024)
- Federica Squarcini (2022–2024)
- Marina Lubian (2022–2026)
- Vittoria Piani (2023–2024)
- Anna Bardaro (2023–2025)
- Cristina Chirichella (2024–2026)
- Matilde Munarini (2025–2026)
- Serena Scognamillo (2025–2026)
- Monica De Gennaro (2013–)
- Raphaela Folie (2016–2022, 2026–)
- Sarah Fahr (2020–)
- Merit Adigwe (2024–)
- Elena Arici (2026–)
- Linda Manfredini (2026–)
- Anna Piovesan (2026–)

European Players

Bulgaria

- Emiliya Nikolova (2012–2015)
- Hristina Vuchkova (2021–2022)

Croatia

- Marina Katić (2014–2015)
- Samanta Fabris (2017–2019)
- Martina Šamadan (2018–2019)

France

- Lucille Gicquel (2020–2021)

Germany

- Berit Kauffeldt (2013–2014)
- Jennifer Janiska (2019–2020)
- Anastasia Cekulaev (2026–)

Greece

- Anthí Vasilantonáki (2014–2016)
- Athina Papafotiou (2017–2018)

Netherlands

- Robin de Kruijf (2016–2024)
- Nika Daalderop (2025–2026)

Poland

- Zuzanna Efimienko-Młotkowska (2012–2013)
- Katarzyna Skorupa (2016–2017)
- Berenika Tomsia (2016–2017)
- Martyna Łukasik (2024–2025)
- Joanna Wołosz (2017–)

Serbia

- Jovana Brakočević-Canzian (2015–2016)

Slovenia

- Fatoumatta Sillah (2025–)

Sweden

- Isabelle Haak (2022–)

Turkey

- Neriman Özsoy (2014–2015)

Non-European Players

Argentina

- Elina Maria Rodríguez (2018–2019)

Brazil

- Gabriela Guimarães (2024–)

Canada

- Alexa Gray (2022–2023)

China

- Zhu Ting (2024–)
- Yao Di (2026–)

Japan

- Miyu Nagaoka (2018–2019)
- Nanami Seki (2024–2025)

United States

- Lauren Gibbemeyer (2013–2014)
- Carli Lloyd (2013–2014)
- Micha Hancock (2014–2015)
- Rachael Adams (2014–2016)
- Alisha Glass-Childress (2014–2016)
- Megan Easy (2015–2016, 2017–2019)
- Kelsey Robinson-Cook (2015–2017, 2022–2024)
- Nicole Fawcett (2016–2017)
- Kimberly Hill (2017–2021)
- Karsta Lowe (2018–2019)
- Chiaka Ogbogu (2019–2020)
- McKenzie Adams (2020–2021)
- Megan Courtney-Lush (2021–2022)
- Kathryn Plummer (2021–2024)
- Stephanie Samedy (2022–2023)
- Madison Bugg (2023–2024)
- Khalia Lanier (2023–2025)
- Jenna Ewert (2025–2026)

Players written in italic still play for the club.

== See also ==
- Roster Imoco Volley Past Squads
- Italian Women's Volleyball League
- Italy women's national volleyball team
- CEV Women's Champions League
- Prosecco
