= Khalia Lanier =

American volleyball player

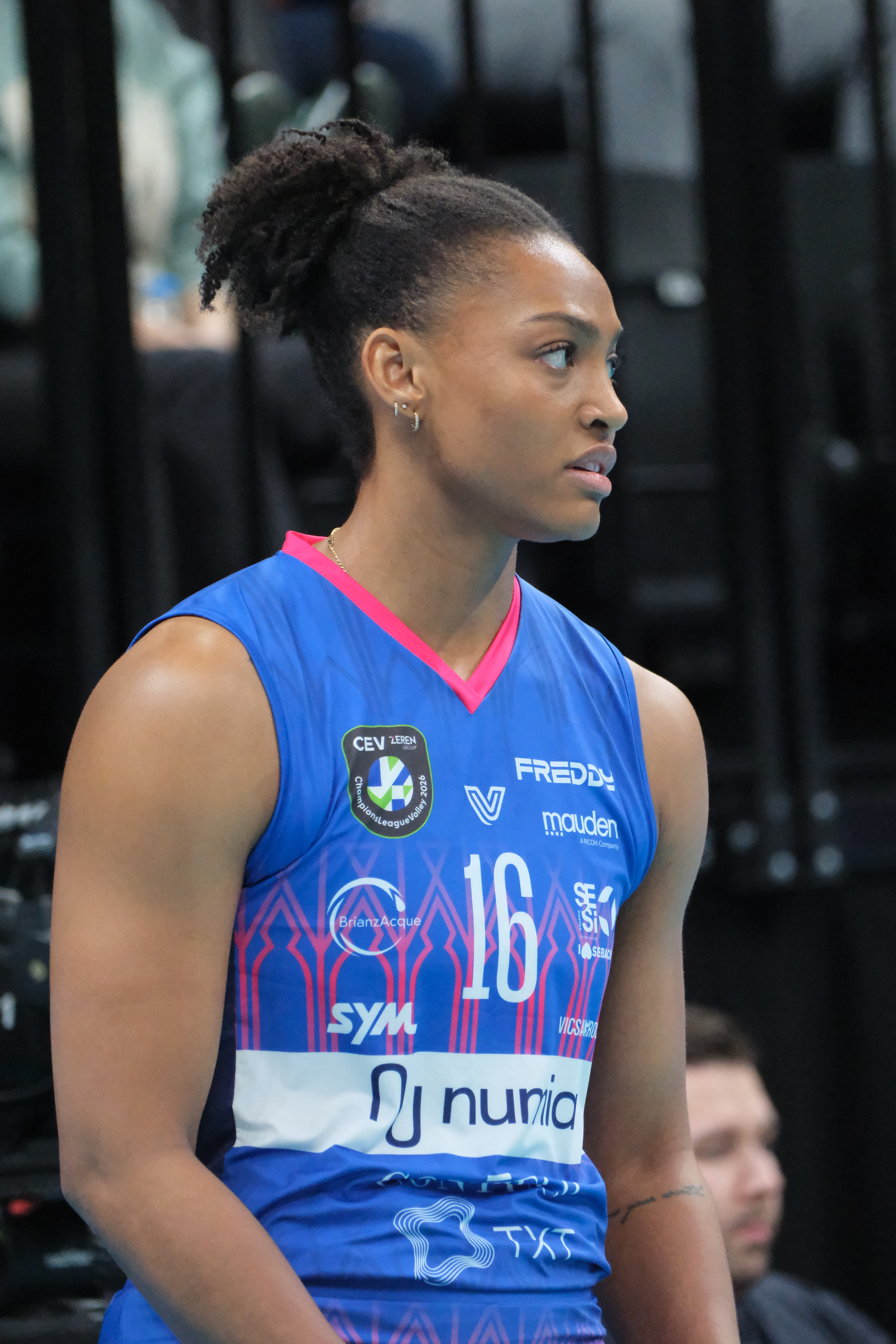
- Lanier playing for Vero Volley Milano in 2026

Personal information
- Full name: Khalia Imani Lanier
- Nationality: (United States) American
- Born: September 19, 1998 (age 28); Scottsdale, Arizona, U.S.
- Hometown: Scottsdale, Arizona, U.S.
- Height: 6 ft 1 in (1.86 m)
- Education: University of Southern California (USC)

Volleyball information
- Position: Outside hitter/Opposite
- Current club: (Italy) Vero Volley Milano
- Number: 16 (club); 29 (national team)

Career
Years	Teams
2016–2019	(United States) USC
2020–2021	(Puerto Rico) Pinkin de Corozal
2021–2023	(Italy) Volley Bergamo 1991
2023–2025	(Italy) Imoco Volley
2025–	(Italy) Vero Volley Milano

National team
2015	United States U18 Team
2017	United States U20 Team
2023–	United States women's national team
Medal record
Women's volleyball
Representing the United States
NORCECA U20 Pan American Cup
Gold medal – first place	2017 San José
FIVB U18 World Championship
Silver medal – second place	2015 Lima	Team

Khalia Imani Lanier (born September 19, 1998) is an American professional volleyball player who plays as an outside hitter for Italian Series A1 team Vero Volley Milano and the United States women's national team. She played collegiately for the USC Trojans volleyball team, where she was an All-American outside hitter.

== Personal life ==
Lanier was born and raised in Scottsdale, Arizona. She is the daughter of NBA Hall of Fame legend Bob Lanier. She chose to play volleyball over basketball, stating in an interview "I didn't want to play basketball because I didn't want to be in [her father's] spotlight."

She attended Xavier College Preparatory high school. She started her international volleyball career as a member of the 2011 USAV Future Select Team. She was part of the United States U18 Team and won a silver medal at the 2015 U18 World Championship.

She was named the 2015–2016 Gatorade National Player of the Year in girls' volleyball, marking her the top high school volleyball player in the nation.

== Career ==
=== College ===
Lanier played college volleyball for USC from 2016 to 2019. She majored in human biology and graduated from USC in the spring of 2020.

As a freshman in 2016, she received AVCA All-America honorable mention and was named to the AVCA All-Pacific South Region Team and the Pac-12 All-Conference and All-Freshman Team. She led the team and ranked second in the Pac-12 for points and was third in the Pac-12 for kills. She started in all 121 sets played for the team and finished with 491 kills, 315 digs and 47 blocks.

With the United States U20 Team, she was the captain of the gold medal-winning team at the 2017 U-20 Pan American Cup, which marked the first time the U20 team earned a medal at the tournament. In the championship match versus Argentina, she led all players with 16 points.

As a sophomore in 2017, she serve as a team captain and was named an AVCA first-team All-American and was on the Pac-12 All-Conference Team. She finished her sophomore season with 511 kills and 578.5 points. She became the 17th player in USC program history to reach 1,000 career kills and only the second to do so in her first two seasons.

As a junior in 2018, she received AVCA All-America honorable mention honors and was on the Pac-12 All-Conference Team for the third straight season, after recording 457 kills and 511.0 points.

As a senior in 2019, she was an AVCA second team All-American. She was a finalist for the Senior CLASS Award in women's volleyball. She ended her career with 2,025 career kills, ranking sixth in the Pac-12 conference's history. She was only the fifth player in league history to collect 2,000 career kills and 1,000 career digs.

=== Professional clubs ===
- (Puerto Rico) Pinkin de Corozal (2020–2021)
- (Italy) Volley Bergamo 1991 (2020–2023)
- (Italy) Imoco Volley (2023–2025)
- (Italy) Vero Volley Milano (2025–)

== Awards and honors ==
=== Clubs ===
- 2023 Italian Super Cup – Champion, with Imoco Volley
- 2023–24 Italian Cup – Champion, with Imoco Volley
- 2023–24 Italian League – Champion, with Imoco Volley
- 2023–24 CEV Champions League – Champion, with Imoco Volley
- 2024 Italian Super Cup – Champion, with Imoco Volley
- 2024 Club World Championship – Champion, with Imoco Volley
- 2024–25 Italian Cup – Champion, with Imoco Volley
- 2024–25 Italian League – Champion, with Imoco Volley
- 2024–25 CEV Champions League – Champion, with Imoco Volley
- 2025 Italian Super Cup – Champion, with Vero Volley Milano

=== College ===
- AVCA All-American (First Team in 2017; Second Team in 2019)
- Pac-12 All-Conference (2016–2019)
- Senior CLASS Award finalist in volleyball (2019)
