= Raphaela Folie =

Italian volleyball player (born 1991)

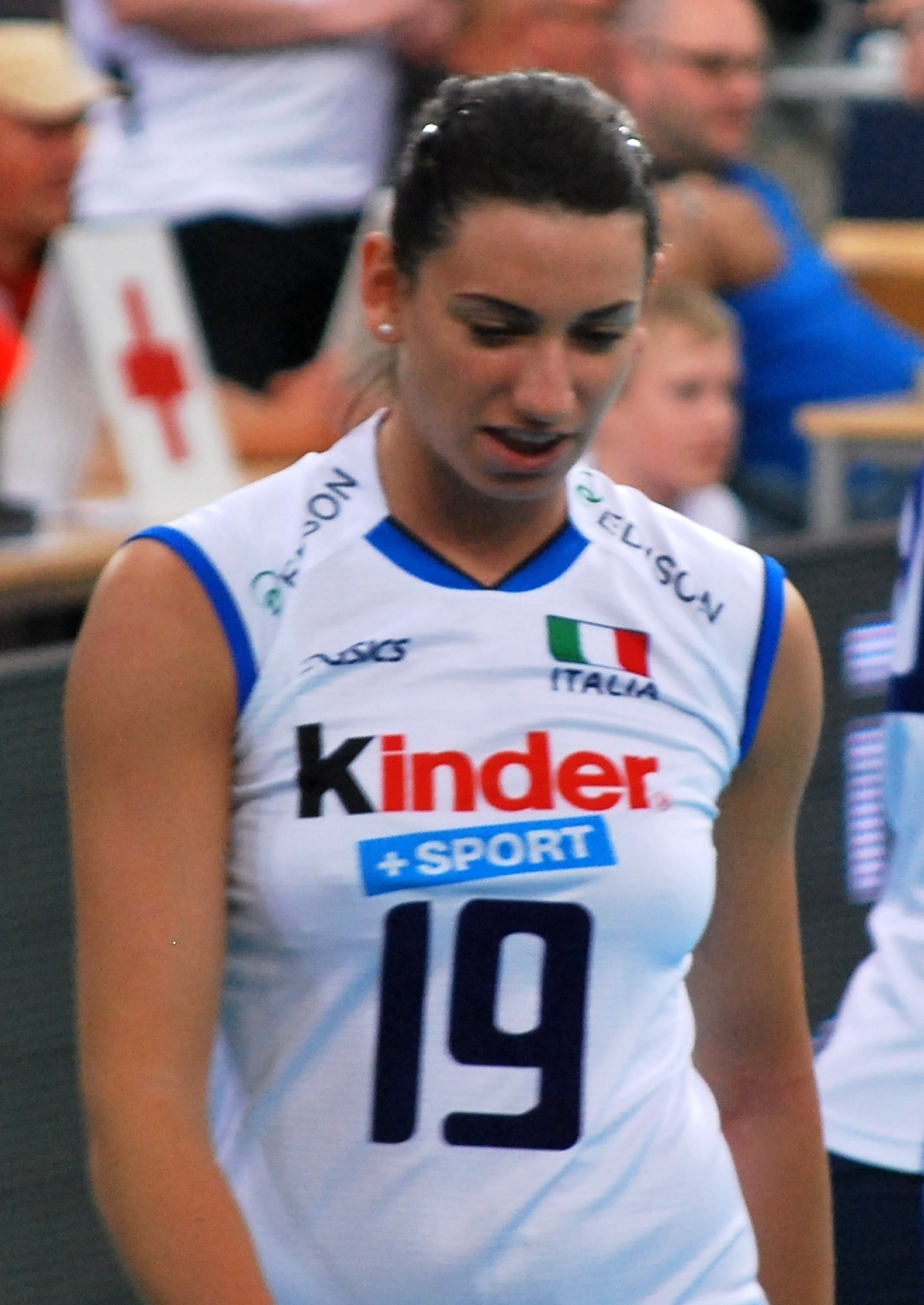

Personal information
- Nationality: Italian
- Born: 7 March 1991 (age 35); Bolzano, Italy
- Height: 1.87 m (6 ft 2 in)
- Weight: 69 kg (152 lb)
- Spike: 327 cm (129 in)
- Block: 237 cm (93 in)

Volleyball information
- Position: Middle blocker
- Current club: Imoco Volley
- Number: 7

Career
Years	Teams
2007–2008; 2008–2009; 2009–2010; 2010–2012; 2012–2013; 2013–2014; 2014–2016; 2016–2022; 2022-2024; 2024-2026; 2026-present	San Giacomo; ATA Trento; Trentino Volley Rosa; Asystel Volley; Asystel MC Carnaghi; Volley Bergamo; LJ Volley; Imoco Volley Conegliano; Pro Victoria Monza; LOVB Houston; Imoco Volley Conegliano

National team
Italy
Honours
Women's volleyball
Representing Italy
World Cup
Gold medal – first place	2011 Japan
European Championship
Bronze medal – third place	2019 Turkey	Team
FIVB World Grand Prix
Silver medal – second place	2017 Nanjing

Raphaela Folie (born 7 March 1991) is an Italian professional volleyball player who plays for Imoco Volley and for national team.

== Career ==
Folie played with her national team at the 2014 World Championship. There her team ended up in fourth place after losing 2–3 to Brazil the bronze medal match.

== Awards ==
=== Clubs ===
- 2012 Italian Super Cup – Runner-Up, with Asystel MC Carnaghi
- 2012–13 Italian Cup (Coppa Italia) – Runner-Up, with Asystel MC Carnaghi
- 2013–14 Italian Cup (Coppa Italia) – Runner-Up, with Volley Bergamo
- 2014–15 Italian Cup (Coppa Italia) – Runner-Up, with Liu Jo Modena
- 2016 Italian Super Cup – Champion, with Imoco Volley Conegliano
- 2016–17 Italian Cup (Coppa Italia) – Champion, with Imoco Volley Conegliano
- 2016–17 CEV Champions League – Runner-Up, with Imoco Volley Conegliano
- 2017 Italian Super Cup – Runner-Up, with Imoco Volley Conegliano
- 2017–18 Italian Cup (Coppa Italia) – Runner-Up, with Imoco Volley Conegliano
- 2017–18 Italian League – Champion, with Imoco Volley Conegliano
- 2018 Italian Super Cup – Champion, with Imoco Volley Conegliano
- 2018–19 Italian Cup (Coppa Italia) – Runner-Up, with Imoco Volley Conegliano
- 2018–19 Italian League – Champion, with Imoco Volley Conegliano
- 2018–19 CEV Champions League – Runner-Up, with Imoco Volley Conegliano
- 2019 Italian Super Cup – Champion, with Imoco Volley Conegliano
- 2019 FIVB Volleyball Women's Club World Championship – Champion, with Imoco Volley Conegliano
- 2019–20 Italian Cup (Coppa Italia) – Champion, with Imoco Volley Conegliano
- 2020 Italian Super Cup – Champion, with Imoco Volley Conegliano
- 2020–21 Italian Cup (Coppa Italia) – Champion, with Imoco Volley Conegliano
- 2020–21 Italian League – Champion, with Imoco Volley Conegliano
- 2020–21 CEV Champions League – Champion, with Imoco Volley Conegliano
- 2021 Italian Super Cup – Champion, with Imoco Volley Conegliano
- 2021 FIVB Volleyball Women's Club World Championship – Runner-Up, with Imoco Volley Conegliano
- 2021–22 Italian Cup (Coppa Italia) – Champion, with Imoco Volley Conegliano
- 2021–22 Italian League – Champion, with Imoco Volley Conegliano
- 2021–22 CEV Champions League – Runner-Up, with Imoco Volley Conegliano
- 2022–23 Italian Cup (Coppa Italia) – Runner-Up, with Vero Volley Milano
- 2022–23 Italian League – Runner-Up, with Vero Volley Milano
- 2023 Italian Super Cup – Runner-Up, with Vero Volley Milano
- 2023–24 Italian Cup (Coppa Italia) – Runner-Up, with Vero Volley Milano
- 2023–24 CEV Champions League – Runner-Up, with Vero Volley Milano
- 2026 Italian Super Cup – Champion, with Imoco Volley Conegliano

=== Individuals ===
- 2020 Italian Super Cup "Most Valuable Player"
