= Joanna Wołosz =

Polish volleyball player

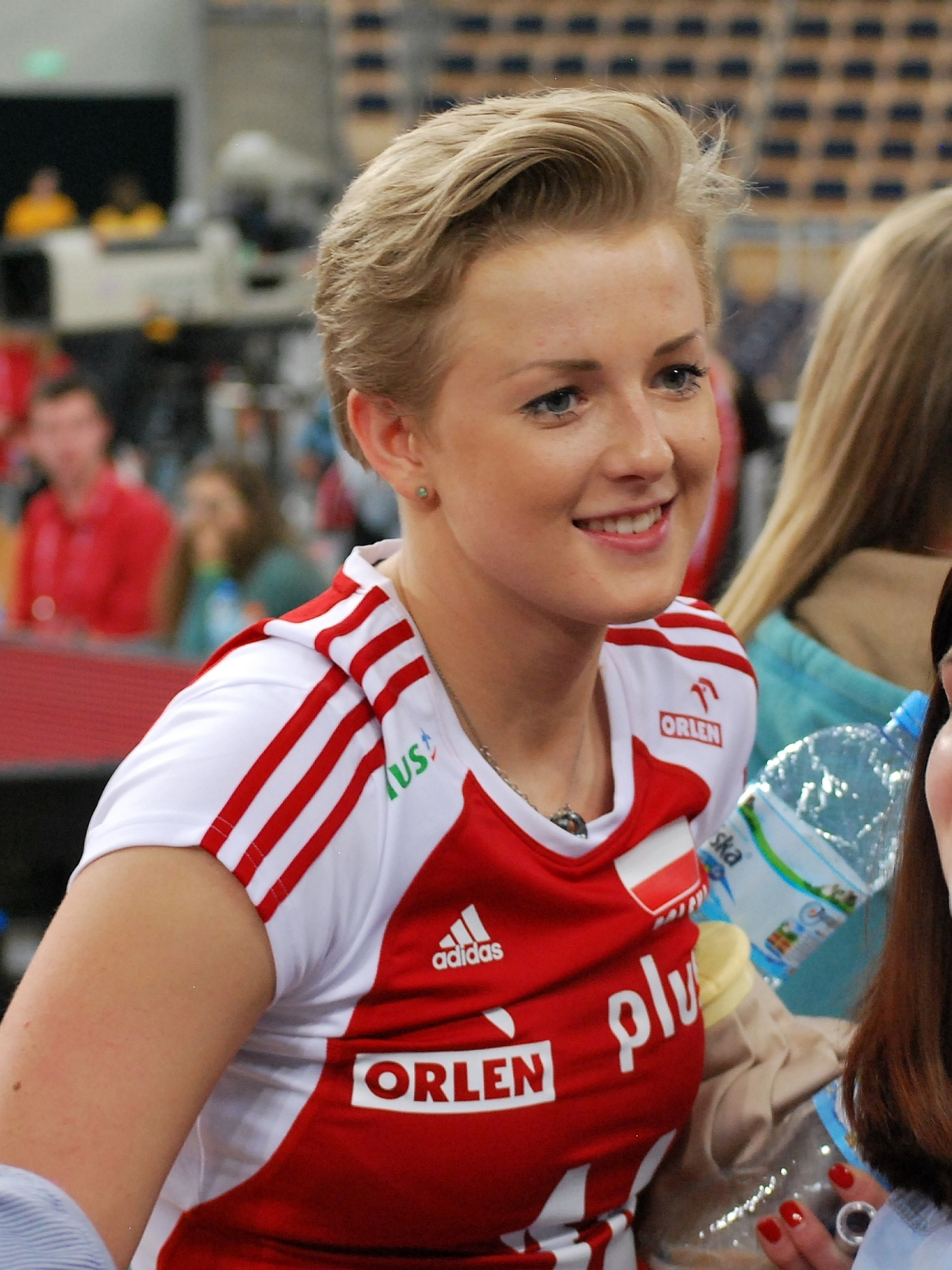

Personal information
- Nationality: Polish
- Born: 7 April 1990 (age 36); Elbląg, Poland
- Height: 1.81 m (5 ft 11 in)
- Weight: 65 kg (143 lb)
- Spike: 303 cm (119 in)
- Block: 281 cm (111 in)

Volleyball information
- Position: Setter
- Current club: Imoco Volley
- Number: 14

National team
2010-2024	Poland (91)
Honours
Women's volleyball
Representing Poland
FIVB Nations League
Bronze medal – third place	2024 Bangkok	Team
European League
Bronze medal – third place	2014
European Games
Silver medal – second place	2015 Baku

Joanna Wołosz (born 7 April 1990) is a Polish volleyball player for Imoco Volley and Polish national volleyball team. She was part of the Poland women's national volleyball team at the 2010 FIVB Volleyball Women's World Championship in Japan.

== Clubs ==
- (Poland) SMS PZPS Szczyrk/Gedania Gdańsk (2007–2009)
- (Poland) Impel Wrocław (2009–2011)
- (Poland) BKS Stal Bielsko-Biała (2011–2013)
- (Italy) Unedo Yamamay Busto Arsizio (2013–2015)
- (Poland) KPS Chemik Police (2015–2017)
- (Italy) Imoco Volley (2017–)

== Awards ==
=== Clubs ===
- 2015 Polish Super Cup – Champion, with Chemik Police
- 2015–16 Polish League – Champion, with Chemik Police
- 2015–16 Polish Cup – Champion, with Chemik Police
- 2015–16 Polish League – Champion, with Chemik Police
- 2016–17 Polish Cup – Champion, with Chemik Police
- 2017–18 Italian League – Champion, with Imoco Volley Conegliano
- 2018 Italian Super Cup – Champion, with Imoco Volley Conegliano
- 2018–19 Italian League – Champion, with Imoco Volley Conegliano
- 2018–19 CEV Champions League – Runner-Up, with Imoco Volley Conegliano
- 2019 Italian Super Cup – Champion, with Imoco Volley Conegliano
- 2019 FIVB Volleyball Women's Club World Championship – Champion, with Imoco Volley Conegliano
- 2019–20 Italian Cup (Coppa Italia) – Champion, with Imoco Volley Conegliano
- 2020 Italian Super Cup – Champion, with Imoco Volley Conegliano
- 2020–21 Italian Cup (Coppa Italia) – Champion, with Imoco Volley Conegliano
- 2020–21 Italian League – Champion, with Imoco Volley Conegliano
- 2020–21 CEV Women's Champions League – Champion, with Imoco Volley Conegliano
- 2021 Italian Super Cup – Champion, with Imoco Volley Conegliano
- 2021 FIVB Volleyball Women's Club World Championship – Runner-Up, with Imoco Volley Conegliano
- 2021–22 Italian Cup (Coppa Italia) – Champion, with Imoco Volley Conegliano
- 2021–22 Italian League – Champion, with Imoco Volley Conegliano
- 2021–22 CEV Women's Champions League – Runner-Up, with Imoco Volley Conegliano
- 2022 Italian Super Cup – Champion, with Imoco Volley Conegliano
- 2022 FIVB Volleyball Women's Club World Championship – Champion, with Imoco Volley Conegliano
- 2022–23 Italian Cup (Coppa Italia) – Champion, with Imoco Volley Conegliano
- 2022–23 Italian League – Champion, with Imoco Volley Conegliano
- 2023 Italian Super Cup – Champion, with Imoco Volley Conegliano
- 2023–24 Italian Cup (Coppa Italia) – Champion, with Imoco Volley Conegliano
- 2023–24 Italian League – Champion, with Imoco Volley Conegliano
- 2023–24 CEV Champions League – Champion, with Imoco Volley Conegliano
- 2024 Italian Super Cup – Champion, with Imoco Volley Conegliano
- 2024 Club World Championship – Champion, with Imoco Volley Conegliano
- 2024–25 Italian Cup (Coppa Italia) – Champion, with Imoco Volley Conegliano
- 2024–25 Italian League – Champion, with Imoco Volley Conegliano
- 2024–25 CEV Champions League – Champion, with Imoco Volley Conegliano
- 2025 Italian Super Cup – Runner-Up, with Imoco Volley Conegliano
- 2025 Club World Championship – Runner-Up, with Imoco Volley Conegliano
- 2025–26 Italian Cup (Coppa Italia) – Champion, with Imoco Volley Conegliano
- 2025–26 Italian League – Champion, with Imoco Volley Conegliano
- 2026 Italian Super Cup – Champion, with Imoco Volley Conegliano

=== Individuals ===
- 2016–17 Polish Cup "Best Setter"
- 2017–18 Italian League "Most Valuable Player"
- 2017–18 CEV Champions League "Best Setter"
- 2019 FIVB Volleyball Women's Club World Championship "Best Setter"
- 2019–20 Italian Cup (Coppa Italia) "Most Valuable Player"
- 2020 Summer Olympics European Qualification "Best Setter"
- 2021 FIVB Volleyball Women's Club World Championship "Best Setter"
- 2022 Italian Super Cup "Most Valuable Player"
- 2022 FIVB Volleyball Women's Club World Championship "Best Setter"
- 2023 Italian Super Cup "Most Valuable Player"
- 2023–24 Italian Cup (Coppa Italia) "Most Valuable Player"
- 2024 FIVB Volleyball Women's Club World Championship "Best Setter"

Awards
Preceded by (Turkey) Naz Aydemir	Best Setter of CEV Champions League; 2017–2018	Succeeded by TBD
