= Robin de Kruijf =

Dutch volleyball player (born 1991)

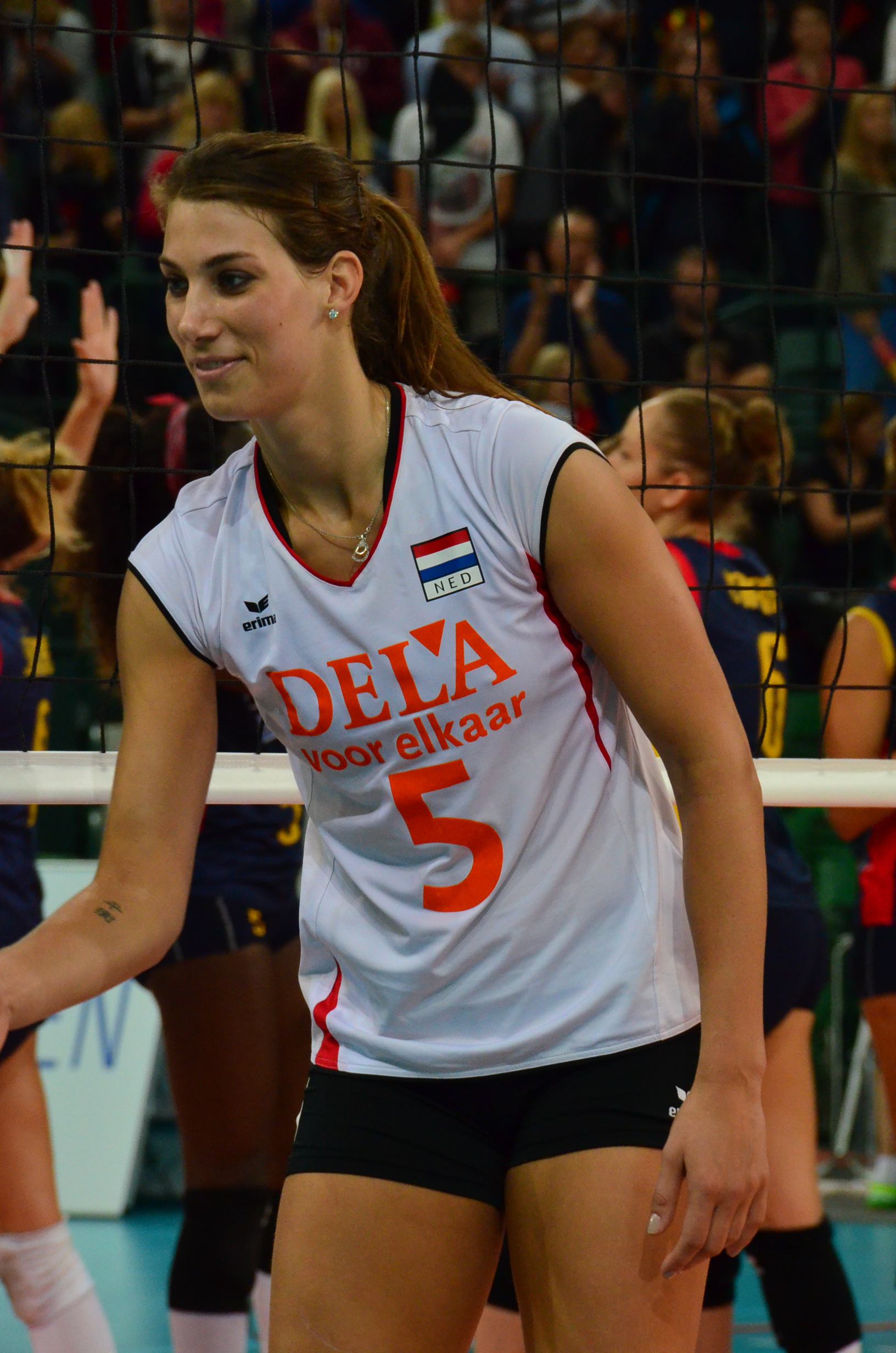

Personal information
- Nationality: Dutch
- Born: 5 May 1991 (age 35); Nieuwegein, Netherlands
- Height: 1.92 m (6 ft 4 in)
- Weight: 79 kg (174 lb)
- Spike: 313 cm (123 in)
- Block: 300 cm (118 in)

Volleyball information
- Position: Middle blocker
- Current club: Imoco Volley Conegliano
- Number: 5

Career
Years	Teams
2006–2007; 2007–2008; 2008–2009; 2009–2011; 2011–2013; 2013–2014; 2014–2016; 2016–2024	Taurus; Pollux Oldenzaal; Martinus Amstelveen; TVC Amstelveen; Dresdner SC; RebecchiNMeccanica Piacenza; VakifBank Istanbul; Imoco Volley Conegliano

National team
Netherlands
Honours
Women's volleyball
Representing the Netherlands
World Grand Prix
Bronze medal – third place	2016 Bangkok
European Championship
Silver medal – second place	2009 Poland
Silver medal – second place	2015 Belgium/Netherlands
Silver medal – second place	2017 Azerbaijan/Georgia

Robin de Kruijf (born 5 May 1991) is a Dutch volleyball player who plays for Imoco Volley and the Netherlands national team. Robin de Kruijf made her debut for the Dutch national team in the Dutch opening match of the Montreux Volley Masters against Cuba in June 2008, at the age of 17. In 2016, De Kruijf and her team won bronze in the World Grand Prix and ended on a historical fourth place in the Rio Olympics.

== Awards ==
=== Individual ===
- 2019 FIVB Volleyball Women's Club World Championship "Best Middle Blocker"
- 2021 FIVB Volleyball Women's Club World Championship "Best Middle Blocker"

=== Clubs ===
- 2008–09 Dutch League - Champion, with Martinus
- 2008–09 Dutch Cup - Champion, with Martinus
- 2009 Dutch Supercup - Champion, with TVC Amstelveen
- 2009–10 Dutch League - Champions, with TVC Amstelveen
- 2009–10 Dutch Cup - Champion, with TVC Amstelveen
- 2013 Italian Supercup - Champion, with River Volley
- 2013–14 Italian League - Champion, with River Volley
- 2013–14 Italian Cup (Coppa Italia) - Champion, with River Volley
- 2014 Turkish Supercup - Champion, with VakıfBank
- 2015–16 Turkish League - Champion, with VakıfBank
- 2016 Italian Supercup - Champion, with Imoco Volley Conegliano
- 2016–17 Italian Cup (Coppa Italia) - Champion, with Imoco Volley Conegliano
- 2016–17 CEV Champions League - Runner-Up, with Imoco Volley Conegliano
- 2017–18 Italian League - Champion, with Imoco Volley Conegliano
- 2018 Italian Supercup - Champion, with Imoco Volley Conegliano
- 2018–19 Italian League - Champion, with Imoco Volley Conegliano
- 2018–19 CEV Champions League - Runner-Up, with Imoco Volley Conegliano
- 2019 Italian Supercup - Champion, with Imoco Volley Conegliano
- 2019 FIVB Club World Championship - Champion, with Imoco Volley Conegliano
- 2019–20 Italian Cup (Coppa Italia) - Champion, with Imoco Volley Conegliano
- 2020 Italian Supercup - Champions, with Imoco Volley Conegliano
- 2020–21 Italian Cup (Coppa Italia) - Champion, with Imoco Volley Conegliano
- 2020–21 Italian League - Champion, with Imoco Volley Conegliano
- 2020–21 CEV Champions League - Champion, with Imoco Volley Conegliano
- 2021 Italian Supercup - Champions, with Imoco Volley Conegliano
- 2021 FIVB Club World Championship - Runner-Up, with Imoco Volley Conegliano
- 2021–22 Italian Cup (Coppa Italia) - Champion, with Imoco Volley Conegliano
- 2021–22 Italian League - Champion, with Imoco Volley Conegliano
- 2021–22 CEV Champions League - Runner-Up, with Imoco Volley Conegliano
- 2022 Italian Supercup - Champions, with Imoco Volley Conegliano
- 2022 FIVB Club World Championship - Champion, with Imoco Volley Conegliano
- 2022–23 Italian Cup (Coppa Italia) - Champion, with Imoco Volley Conegliano
- 2022–23 Italian League - Champion, with Imoco Volley Conegliano
- 2023 Italian Supercup - Champions, with Imoco Volley Conegliano
- 2023–24 Italian Cup (Coppa Italia) - Champion, with Imoco Volley Conegliano
- 2023–24 Italian League - Champion, with Imoco Volley Conegliano
- 2023–24 CEV Champions League - Champion, with Imoco Volley Conegliano

== Personal life ==
De Kruijf grew up in Schalkwijk. She has two younger brothers.
