= Kathryn Plummer =

American volleyball player (born 1998)

Kathryn Plummer Boden
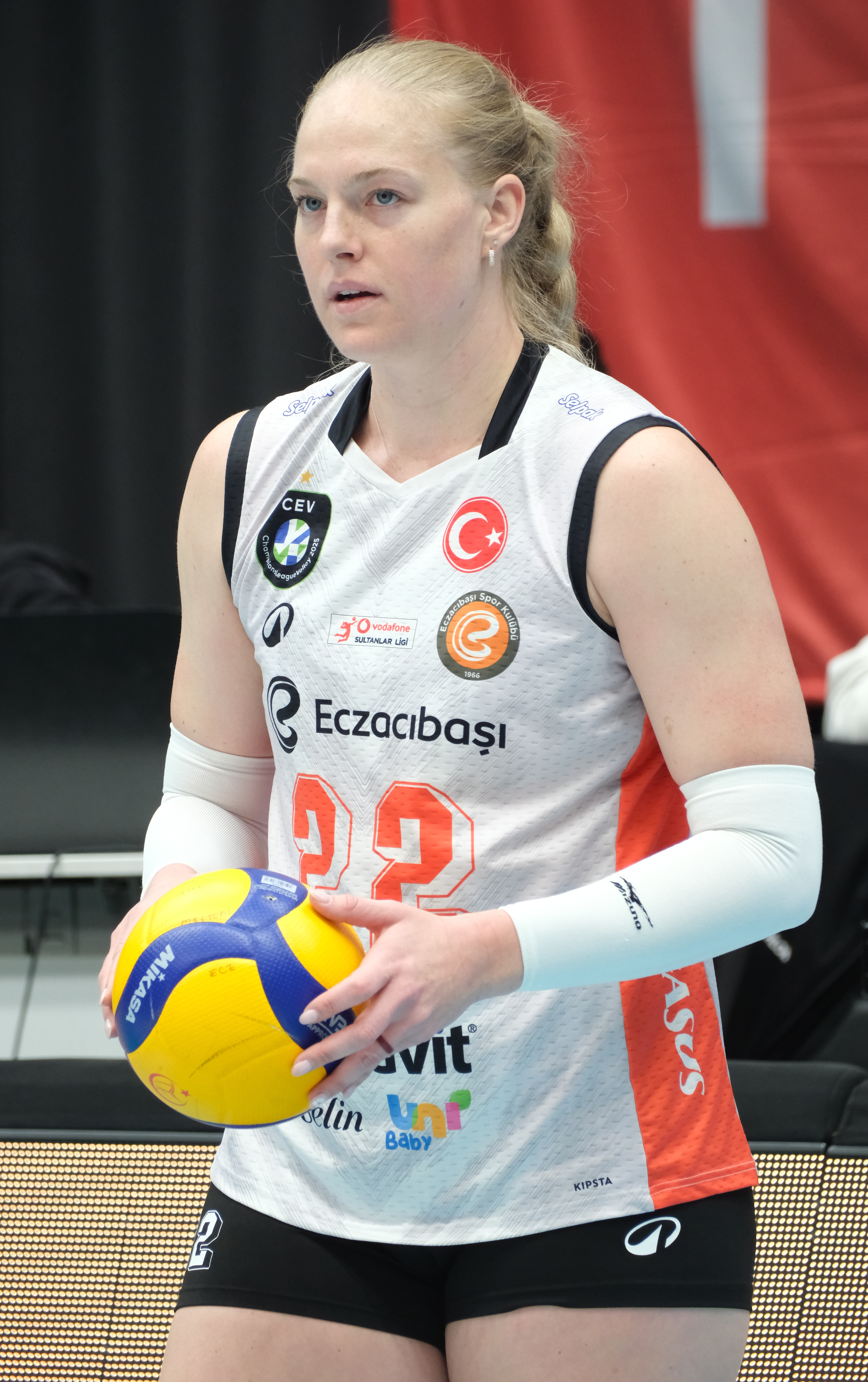
- Plummer playing for Eczacıbaşı Dynavit

Personal information
- Full name: Kathryn Plummer Boden
- Nationality: United States
- Born: October 16, 1998 (age 28); Long Beach, California, U.S.
- Hometown: Aliso Viejo, California
- Height: 198 cm (6 ft 6 in)
- Weight: 88 kg (194 lb)
- Spike: 314 cm (124 in)
- Block: 300 cm (118 in)
- Education: Stanford University

Volleyball information
- Position: Outside hitter / Opposite
- Current club: (United States) LOVB Los Angeles
- Number: 22

Career
| Years | Teams |
|---|---|
| 2019–2020 | (Italy) Saugella Team Monza |
| 2020–2021 | (Japan) Denso Airybees |
| 2021–2024 | (Italy) Imoco Volley Conegliano |
| 2024–2026 | (Turkey) Eczacıbaşı Dynavit |
| 2027– | (United States) LOVB Los Angeles |

National team
| 2019-present | United States |
Medal record
Indoor Volleyball
Representing the United States
Olympic Games
| Silver medal – second place | 2024 Paris | Team |
Pan-American Cup
| Gold medal – first place | 2019 Trujillo/Chiclayo |

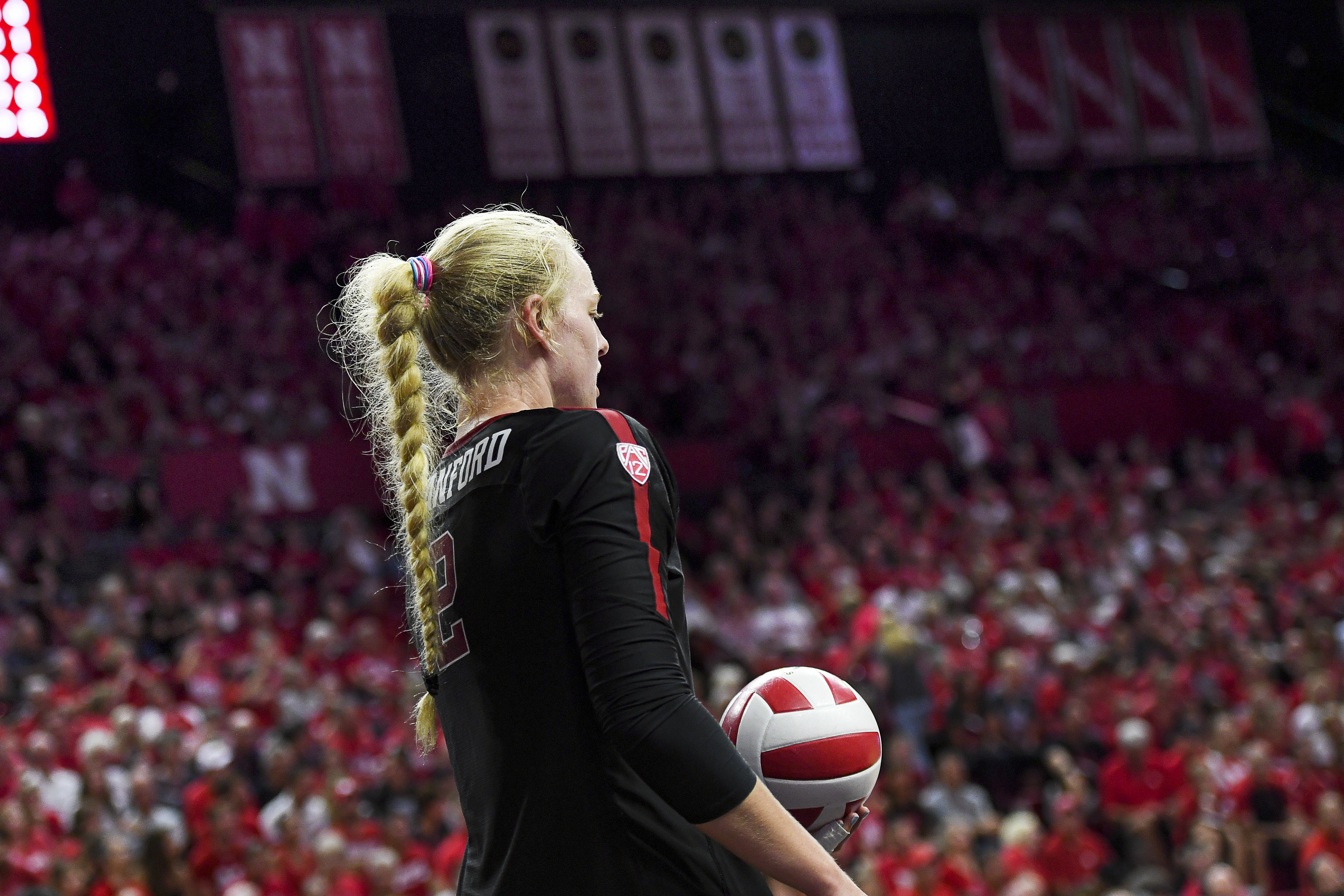
Plummer serving at Stanford v Nebraska match

Kathryn Rose Plummer Boden (born October 16, 1998) is an American professional volleyball player who plays as an outside hitter for the United States women's national volleyball team and the Turkish club Eczacıbaşı Dynavit.

== Early life ==
Plummer was born to Kevin and Michelle Plummer and grew up in Aliso Viejo, California. She attended Aliso Niguel High School where she played volleyball and graduated in 2016.

== Career ==
=== College ===
Plummer was heavily recruited out of high school, getting her first scholarship offer in the 7th grade. She ultimately selected Stanford on a full athletic scholarship. While at Stanford, she helped Stanford win NCAA national championships in 2016, 2018 and 2019. She was named to the NCAA all-tournament team all three years, and won the Most Outstanding Player award in 2018 and 2019. As a freshman, she won National Freshman of the Year by the AVCA, and in 2017 and 2018 she was named the National Player of the Year.

=== Professional clubs ===
- (Italy) Saugella Team Monza (2019–2020)
- (Japan) Denso Airybees (2020–2021)
- (Italy) Imoco Volley (2021–2024)
- (Turkey) Eczacıbaşı Dynavit (2024–2026)
- (United States) LOVB (2027–)

On December 30, 2019, Plummer signed her first professional contract with Italian side Saugella Team Monza. She made her Serie A debut on January 19 in Monza's 3-2 defeat against Zanetti Bergamo in which she came on as a substitute and scored 9 points. She was the top scorer in Monza's Coppa Italia quarter final upset over Igor Gorgonzola Novara and played a key role for her team to reach their second-ever Coppa Italia final four, where they were eventually defeated by Unet E-Work Busto Arsizio in the semi-finals. In CEV Cup, Plummer only played in Monza's 3-1 loss in the second leg of the round of 16 match-up against Dinamo Kazan which eliminated them from the competition.

On October 2, 2020, Plummer signed with Denso Airybees.

On June 18, 2021, Plummer signed with Imoco Volley.

On 10 May 2024, Turkish club Eczacıbaşı Dynavit announced the addition of Plummer to their roster.

=== USA National Team ===
In May 2021, Plummer was named to the 18-player roster for the FIVB Volleyball Nations League tournament. that was played May 25-June 24 in Rimini, Italy. She led the team with 14 kills and two blocks in her debut, when they swept Dominican Republic in team USA's opening match.

She was selected as an Olympic alternate for the 2020 Summer Olympics. She was named to the Olympic team for the 2024 Summer Olympics. During Plummer's time at the 2024 Summer Olympics, Plummer had scored 26 points, including 23 kills with one of them being the final swing to win the game during the semifinals. This helped the United States defeat Brazil and advance to the finals, where she helped her team win a Silver Medal.

== Awards and honors ==
=== Clubs ===
- 2021–22, 2022–23, 2023–24 Italian Supercup - Champion, with Imoco Volley Conegliano
- 2021–22, 2022–23, 2023–24 Italian Cup (Coppa Italia) - Champion, with Imoco Volley Conegliano
- 2021–22, 2022–23, 2023–24 Italian League - Champion, with Imoco Volley Conegliano
- 2022 Club World Championship - Champion, with Imoco Volley Conegliano
- 2023–24 CEV Champions League - Champion, with Imoco Volley Conegliano

=== College ===
- 2016 NCAA Division I National Champions
- 2018 NCAA Division I National Champions
- 2019 NCAA Division I National Champions
- Senior CLASS Award (2019)
- Honda Sports Award for volleyball (2019)
- James E. Sullivan Award (2019)
- AVCA National Player of the Year (2017, 2018)
- AVCA National Freshman of the Year (2016)
- NCAA Most Outstanding Player (2018, 2019)

=== International ===
- 2019 Pan-American Cup
- 2024 Olympic Games
