= Sarah Fahr =

Italian volleyball player (born 2001)

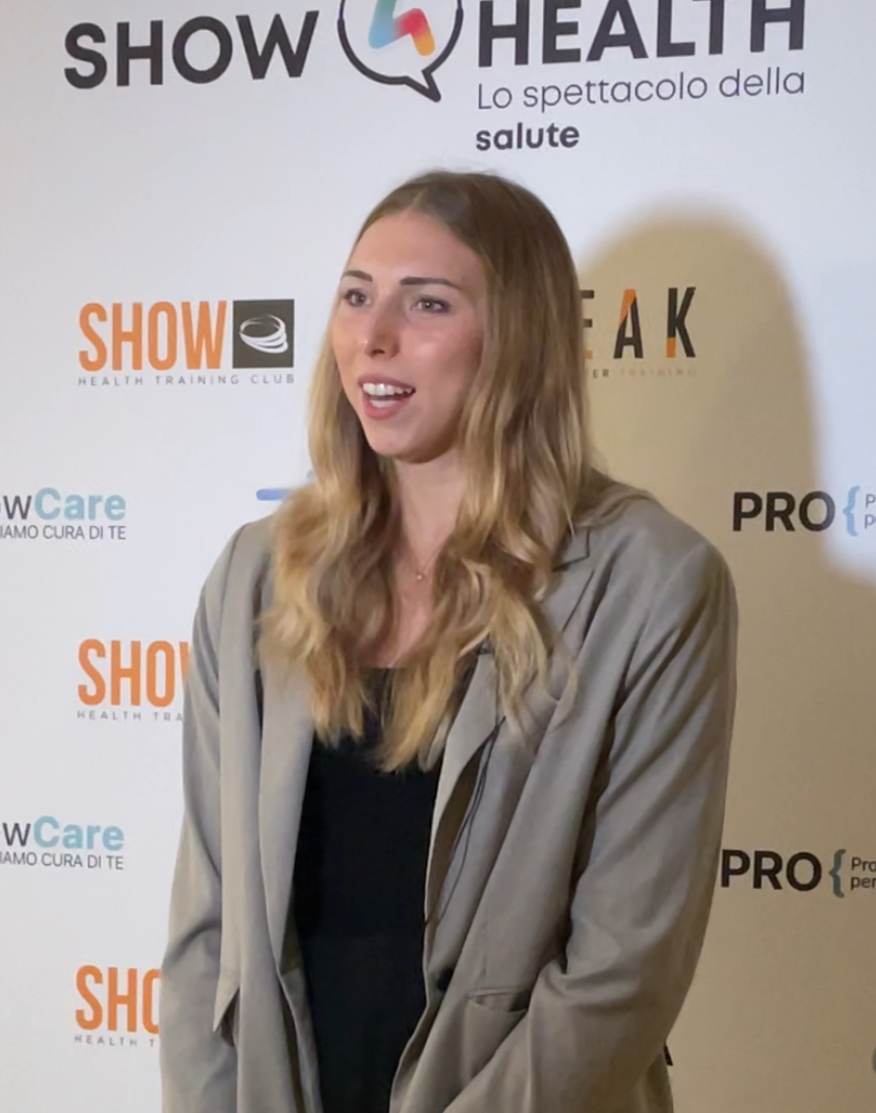
- Fahr in 2024

Personal information
- Born: 12 September 2001 (age 25) Kulmbach, Bavaria, Germany
- Height: 1.92 m (6 ft 4 in)
- Weight: 84 kg (185 lb)
- Spike: 322 cm (127 in)
- Block: 306 cm (120 in)

Volleyball information
- Position: Middle-blocker
- Current club: Imoco Volley Conegliano
- Number: 19

National team
- Years: Team
- 2017–: Italy
Honours
Women's volleyball
Representing Italy
Olympic Games
Gold medal – first place	2024 Paris	Team
World Championship
Gold medal – first place	2025 Thailand	Team
Silver medal – second place	2018 Japan	Team
FIVB Nations League
Gold medal – first place	2024 Bangkok	Team
Gold medal – first place	2025 Łódź	Team
Bronze medal – third place	2026 Macau	Team
European Championship
Gold medal – first place	2021 Serbia/Bulgaria/Croatia/Romania	Team
Bronze medal – third place	2019 Turkey	Team
Silver medal – second place	2026 Azerbaijan-Czechia-Sweden-Turkey	Team
Montreux Volley Masters
Bronze medal – third place	2019 Montreux	Team

Sarah Luisa Fahr (born 12 September 2001) is a professional volleyball player who plays as a middle-blocker for Imoco Volley Conegliano. Born in Germany, she plays for the Italy national team.

== Personal life ==
She was born in Bavaria to German parents but was raised in Piombino, Tuscany, in Italy.

== Career ==
She participated at the 2017 FIVB Volleyball Girl's U18 World Championship, 2018 FIVB Volleyball Women's Nations League, 2018 FIVB Volleyball Women's World Championship, 2019 Montreux Volley Masters, and 2019 Women's European Volleyball Championship.

== Awards ==
=== Individuals ===
- 2024 Volleyball Nations League "Best Middle Blocker"
- 2024 Italian Supercup "Most Valuable Player"
- 2024 Club World Championship "Best Middle Blocker"

=== Clubs ===
- 2020 Italian Supercup – Champions, with Imoco Volley Conegliano
- 2020–21 Italian Cup (Coppa Italia) – Champion, with Imoco Volley Conegliano
- 2020–21 Italian League – Champion, with Imoco Volley Conegliano
- 2020–21 CEV Champions League – Champion, with Imoco Volley Conegliano
- 2021 Italian Supercup – Champions, with Imoco Volley Conegliano
- 2021–22 Italian Cup (Coppa Italia) – Champion, with Imoco Volley Conegliano
- 2021–22 Italian League – Champion, with Imoco Volley Conegliano
- 2022 Italian Supercup – Champions, with Imoco Volley Conegliano
- 2022–23 Italian Cup (Coppa Italia) – Champion, with Imoco Volley Conegliano
- 2022–23 Italian League – Champion, with Imoco Volley Conegliano
- 2023 Italian Supercup – Champions, with Imoco Volley Conegliano
- 2023–24 Italian Cup (Coppa Italia) – Champion, with Imoco Volley Conegliano
- 2023–24 Italian League – Champion, with Imoco Volley Conegliano
- 2023–24 CEV Champions League – Champion, with Imoco Volley Conegliano
- 2024 Italian Supercup – Champions, with Imoco Volley Conegliano
- 2024 Club World Championship – Champion, with Imoco Volley Conegliano
- 2024–25 Italian Cup (Coppa Italia) – Champion, with Imoco Volley Conegliano
- 2024–25 Italian League – Champion, with Imoco Volley Conegliano
- 2024–25 CEV Champions League – Champion, with Imoco Volley Conegliano
- 2025 Italian Super Cup – Runner-Up, with Imoco Volley Conegliano
- 2025 Club World Championship – Runner-Up, with Imoco Volley Conegliano
- 2025–26 Italian Cup (Coppa Italia) – Champion, with Imoco Volley Conegliano
- 2025–26 Italian League – Champion, with Imoco Volley Conegliano
- 2026 Italian Super Cup – Champion, with Imoco Volley Conegliano
