= Letizia Camera =

Italian volleyball player (born 1992)

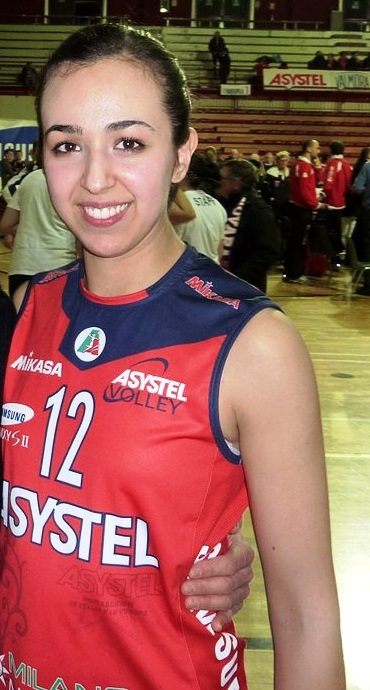

Personal information
- Nationality: Italy
- Born: 1 October 1992 (age 34); Acqui Terme, Italy
- Height: 1.75 m (5 ft 9 in)
- Weight: 61 kg (134 lb)
- Spike: 289 cm (114 in)
- Block: 275 cm (108 in)

Volleyball information
- Position: Setter
- Current club: Saint-Raphaël Var VB
- Number: 4 (national team); 18 (club)

National team
2012–	Italy

Letizia Camera (born 1 October 1992 in Acqui Terme) is an Italian professional female volleyball player who plays as a setter. As part of the Italy women's national volleyball team she participated in international tournaments such as the FIVB World Grand Prix (in 2012, 2013 and 2015), the 2013 European Championship, the 2015 Montreux Masters and the 2015 European Games.

At club level she played for teams in Italy (Asystel Volley, Imoco Volley, Volleyball Casalmaggiore, Futura Volley Busto Arsizio) and France (RC Cannes, Saint-Raphaël Var VB).

== Clubs ==
- (Italy) Asystel Volley Novara (2007–2012)
- (Italy) Imoco Volley Conegliano (2012–2013)
- (Italy) Pomì Casalmaggiore (2013–2014)
- (Italy) Unendo Yamamay Busto Arsizio (2014–2015)
- (France) RC Cannes (2015–2016)
- (France) Saint-Raphaël Var VB (2016–present)

== Awards ==
=== Club ===
- 2008–09 CEV Cup — Gold medal (with Asystel Novara)
- 2008–09 Italian Cup — Silver medal (with Asystel Novara)
- 2008–09 Italian Championship — Silver medal (with Asystel Novara)
- 2008–09 Italian Championship — Silver medal (with Imoco Volley Conegliano)
- 2014–15 CEV Champions League — Silver medal (with Unendo Yamamay Busto Arsizio)
- 2015–16 French Cup — Gold medal (with RC Cannes)
- 2015–16 French Championship — Silver medal (with RC Cannes)
