= Katarzyna Skorupa =

Polish volleyball player (born 1984)

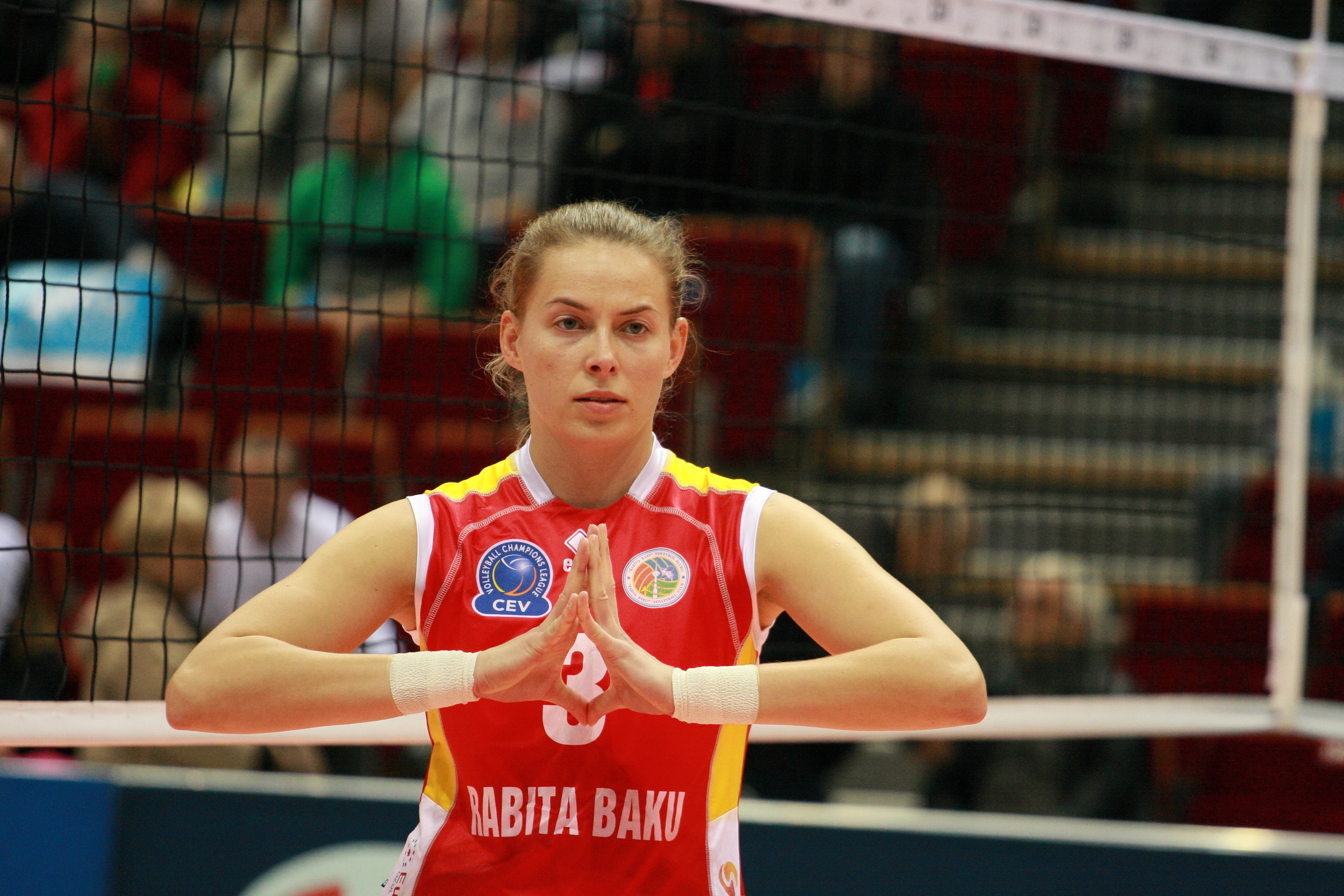

Personal information
- Nationality: Polish
- Born: 16 September 1984 (age 42); Radom, Poland
- Height: 1.84 m (6 ft 0 in)
- Weight: 69 kg (152 lb)
- Spike: 302 cm (119 in)
- Block: 296 cm (117 in)

Volleyball information
- Number: 18

Career
Years	Teams
2016	(Turkey) Fenerbahçe Grundig

National team
2008	Poland

Katarzyna Skorupa (born 16 September 1984) is a Polish volleyball player. She was part of the Poland women's national volleyball team. She competed with the national team at the 2008 Summer Olympics in Beijing, China. She has played for Imoco Volley Conegliano since 2016. She is openly lesbian.

== Clubs ==
- (Poland) Farmutil (2008)
- (Turkey) Fenerbahçe Grundig (2015-2016)
- (Italy) Imoco Volley Conegliano (2016–2017)
- (Italy) Igor Novara (2017–2018)
- (Italy) Pomì Casalmaggiore (2018–2019)
- (Italy) Saugella Team Monza (2019–2020)
- (Poland) E.Leclerc Moya Radomka Radom (2020–)
