= Elisa Cella =

Italian volleyball player (born 1982)

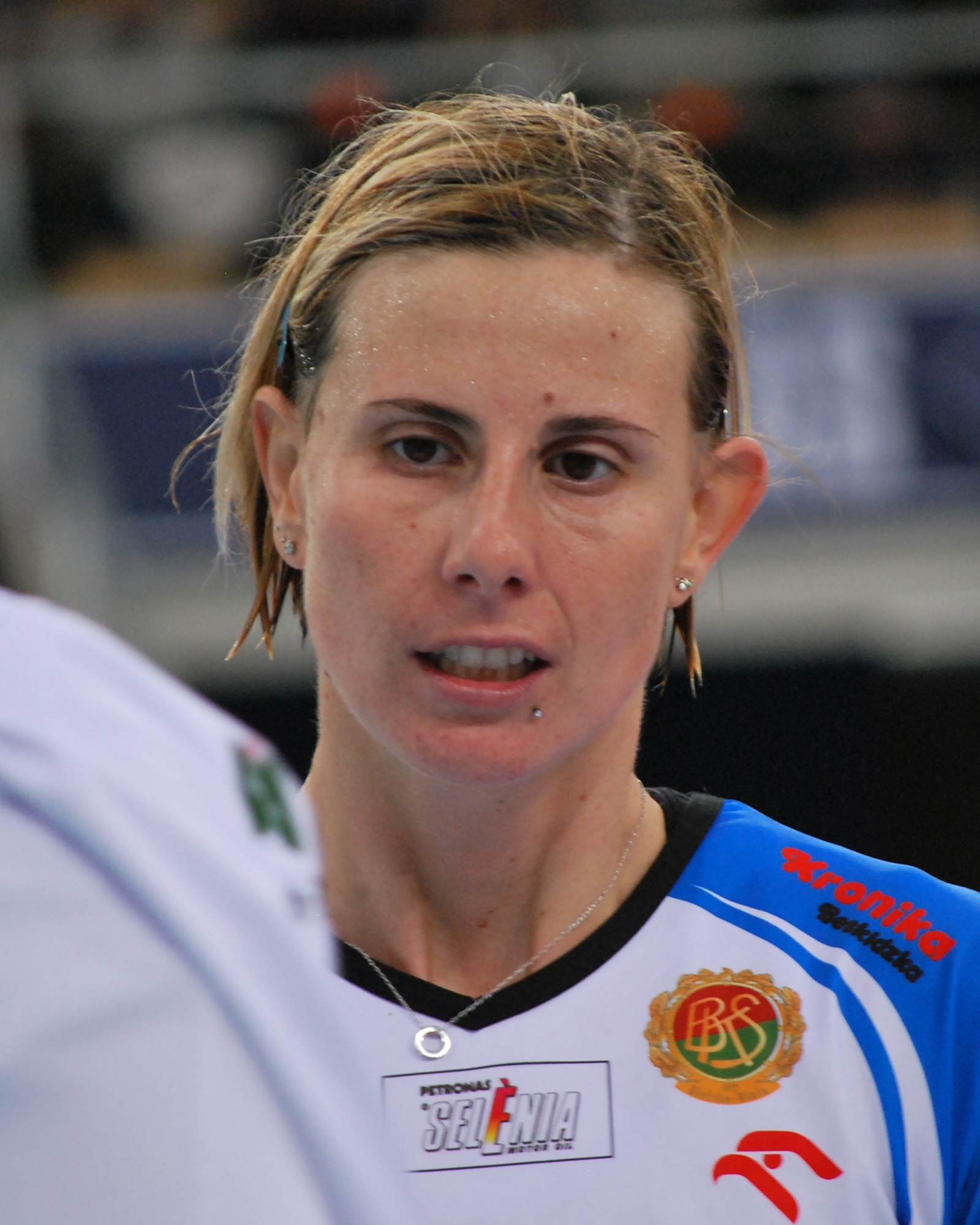

Personal information
- Born: June 4, 1982 (age 44); Ravenna, Italy
- Height: 1.86 m (6 ft 1 in)
- Weight: 72 kg (159 lb)
- Spike: 304 cm (120 in)
- Block: 286 cm (113 in)

Volleyball information
- Position: Opposite spiker
- Number: 4

National team
2004 –2007	Italy
Honours
Women's Volleyball
Representing Italy

Elisa Cella (born 4 June 1982 in Ravenna) is an Italian volleyball player. She played for the Italy women's national volleyball team at the 2005 FIVB World Grand Prix, and 2006 FIVB World Grand Prix.

== Clubs ==
Club	Country	From	To
Sestese Volley	Italy	1996-1997	1996-1997
Robur Pallavolo Scandicci	Italy	1997-1998	1997-1998
Sestese Volley	Italy	1998-1999	1999-2000
Volley Vicenza	Italy	2000-2001	2000-2001
Volley 2002 Forlì	Italy	2001-2002	2002-2003
Pallavolo Corridonia	Italy	2003-2004	2003-2004
Start Volley Arzano	Italy	2004-2005	2005-2006
Pieralisi Volley	Italy	2006-2007	2007-2008
River Volley Piacenza	Italy	January 2008	May 2008
Sassuolo Volley	Italy	2008-2009	2008-2009
Aprilia Volley	Italy	2009-2010	2009-2010
Parme Volley Girls	Italy	2010-2011	2010-2011
River Volley Piacenza	Italy	2011-2012	2011-2012
Bielsko-Biała	Poland	2012-2013	2012-2013
Béziers Volley	France	2013-2014	2013-2014
Obiettivo Risarcimento Vicenza	Italy	2014-2015	2015-2016
Imoco Volley Conegliano	Italy	2016-2017	2017-2018
Volalto Caserta	Italy	2018-2019	-
