= Merit Adigwe =

Italian volleyball player (born 2006)

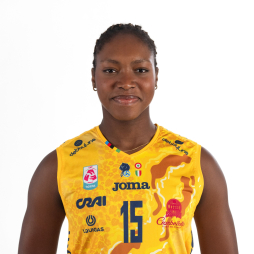

Personal information
- Born: 24 August 2006 (age 20); Crema, Italy
- Height: 183 cm (6 ft 0 in)
Honours
Women's volleyball
Representing Italy
FIVB Nations League
Bronze medal – third place	2026 Macau	Team
European Championship
Silver medal – second place	2026 Azerbaijan-Czechia-Sweden-Turkey	Team

Merit Adigwe (born 24 August 2006) is an Italian volleyball player.

== Life and career ==
Born in Crema to a family of Nigerian origin, Adigwe began playing volleyball at 15, first as a middle blocker before becoming an opposite hitter. In 2022, she became champion at the U18 European Championship, scoring 21 points in the final. She later won bronze at the 2023 U19 World Championship and silver at the 2024 U20 European Championship. The same year, she made her A1 League debut with Imoco Volley. In 2025, she became world champion and was named MVP of the tournament at the U21 World Championship.

In 2026, Adigwe won the gold at the U22 European Volleyball Championship, and the same year, she made her debut with the Italian team at the Nations League, in which Italy went on to win the bronze. She was later selected to be part of the Italian roster at the 2026 Women's European Volleyball Championship.
