= Martina Šamadan =

Croatian volleyball player (born 1993)

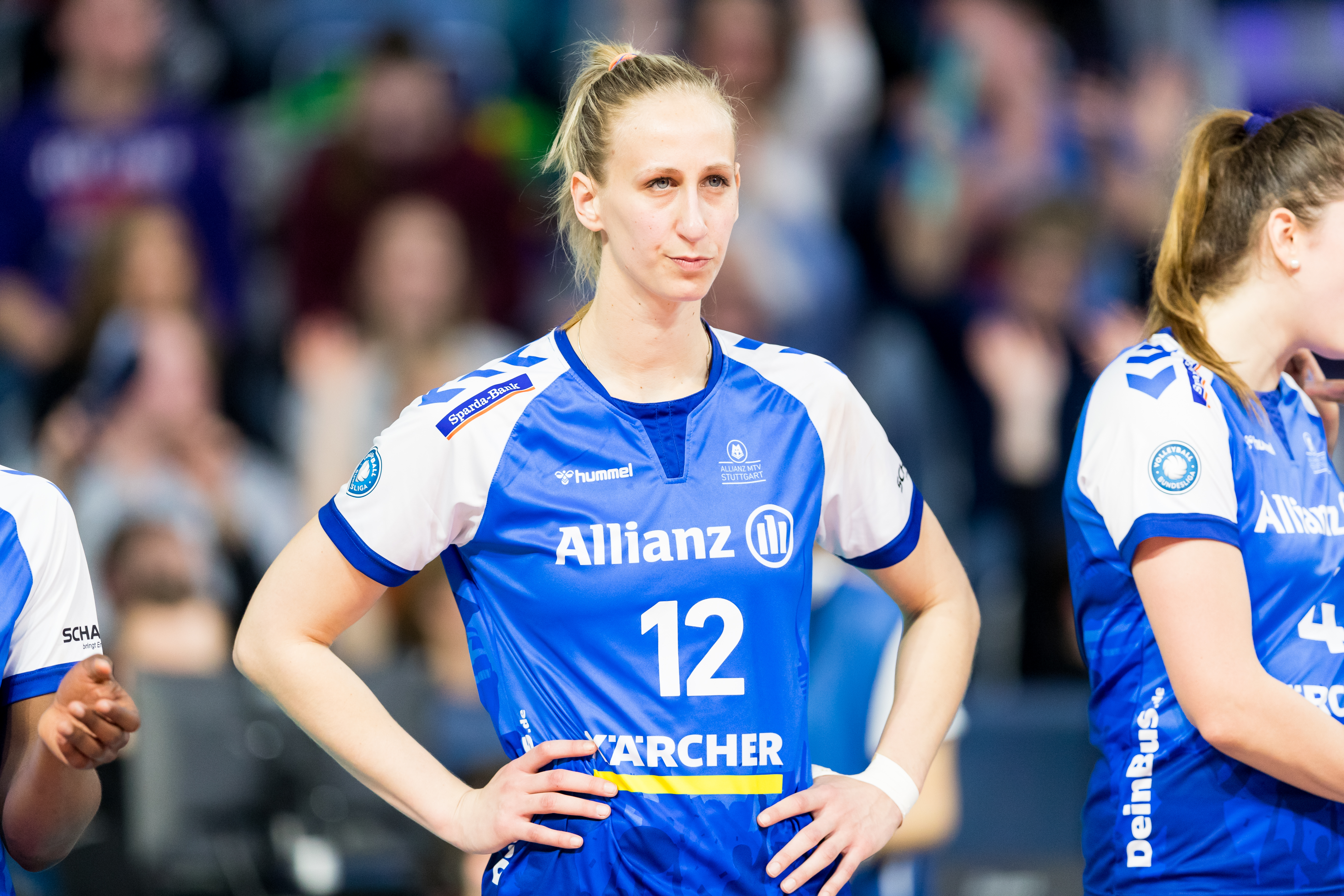
- Šamadan in 2020

Personal information
- Born: 11 September 1993 (age 33); Split, Croatia
- Height: 1.93 m (6 ft 4 in)
- Weight: 80 kg (180 lb)
- Spike: 310 cm (120 in)
- Block: 305 cm (120 in)

Volleyball information
- Position: Middle blocker
- Current club: Panathinaikos
- Number: 12

Career
Years	Teams
2012–2016; 2016–2017; 2017–2018; 2018–2019; 2019; 2019–2020; 2020–2021; 2021–2022; 2022–2023; 2023–	Seattle Redhawks; CSM Volei Alba Blaj; HAOK Mladost; Imoco Volley; Futura Volley Busto Arsizio; Allianz MTV Stuttgart; Savino del Bene Scandicci; HAOK Mladost; Volley-Ball Nantes; Panathinaikos

National team
Croatia
Honours
Women's volleyball
Representing Croatia
FIVB Challenger Cup
Gold medal – first place	2022 Zadar
Mediterranean Games
Gold medal – first place	2018 Tarragona
European League
Silver medal – second place	2021 Ruse

Martina Šamadan (born 11 September 1993) is a Croatian volleyball player. She plays as middle blocker for Greek club Panathinaikos.

== International career ==
She is a member of the Croatia women's national volleyball team. She competed at the 2021 Women's European Volleyball League, winning a silver medal.

== Awards ==
=== Clubs ===
- 2023–24 Greek Volleyball League Champion, with Panathinaikos
