= Valentina Fiorin =

Italian volleyball player (born 1984)

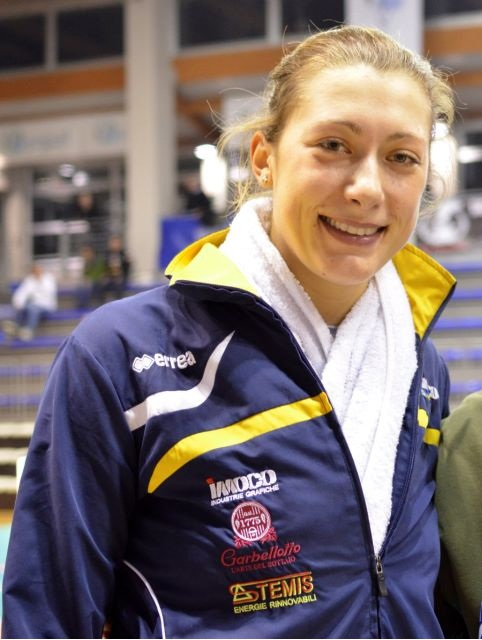

Personal information
- Born: 9 October 1984 (age 42) Dolo, Veneto, Italy
- Height: 1.87 m (6 ft 2 in)
- Spike: 305 cm (120 in)
- Block: 287 cm (113 in)

Volleyball information
- Position: Outside hitter
- Current club: (Italy) Pallavolo Scandicci

National team
- Years: Team
- 2004-2012: Italy
Honours
Representing Italy
FIVB World Grand Prix
| Silver medal – second place | 2004 Reggio Calabria | Team |
| Silver medal – second place | 2005 Sendai | Team |
| Bronze medal – third place | 2006 Reggio Calabria | Team |
| Bronze medal – third place | 2007 Ningbo | Team |
European Championship
| Gold medal – first place | 2007 Belgium/Luxembourg | Team |

Valentina Fiorin (born 9 October 1984) is a retired Italian volleyball player. She was born in Dolo, Veneto.

In 1999 she started playing for the professional club Petrarca Sartori Padova. She played for Foppapedretti Bergamo. She played for RC Cannes until 2010.

On 1 December 2011, Ageo Medics announced her joining. After her spell in Japan she returned to Imoco Volley of Conegliano, where she played a total of three seasons, and in June 2015 she signed for Savino Del Bene Scandicci.
