= Valentina Serena =

Italian volleyball player (born 1981)

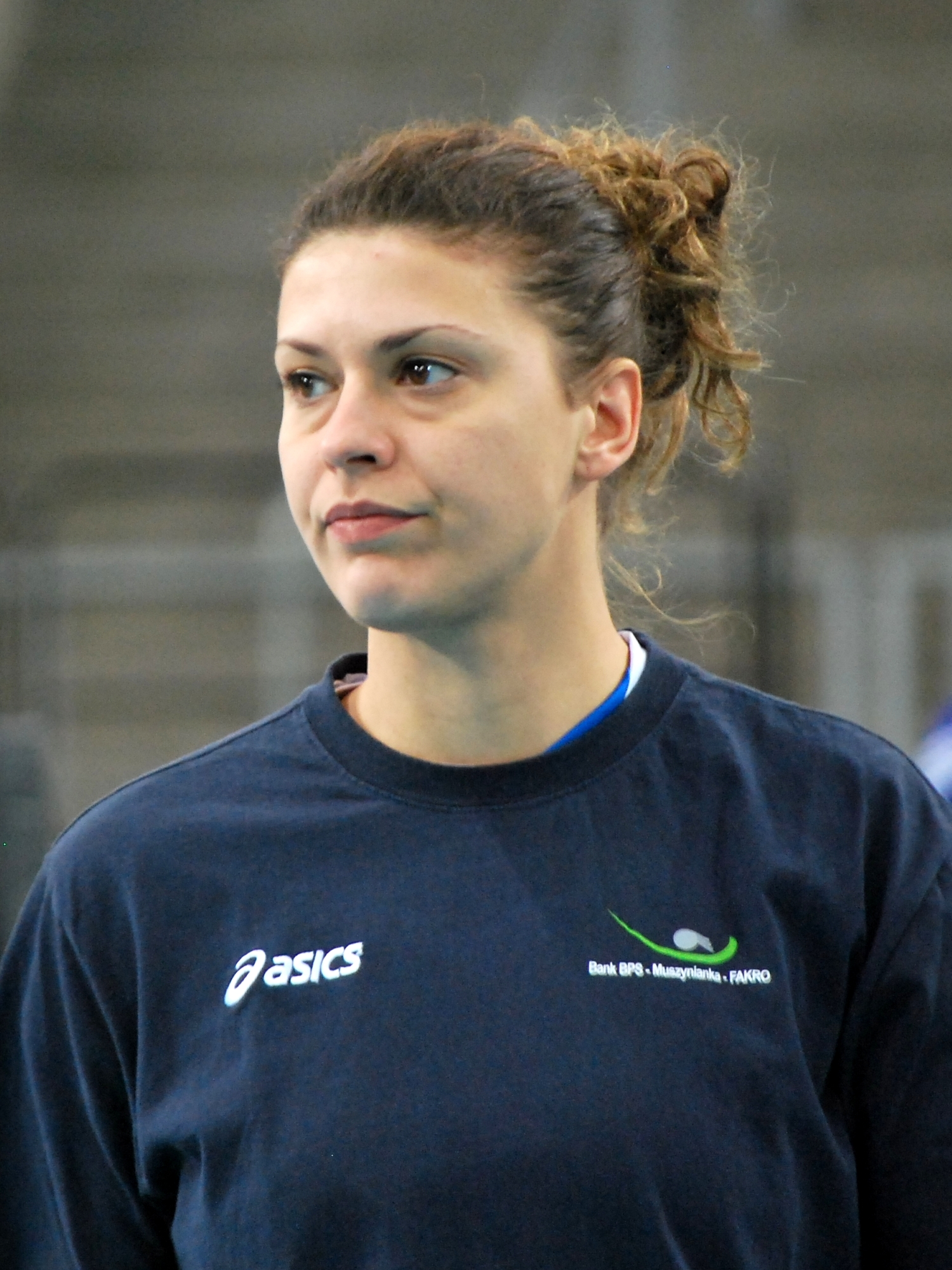
- Serena in 2012

Personal information
- Full name: Valentina Serena
- Nationality: Italy
- Born: 10 November 1981 (age 44) Oderzo, Italy
- Home town: Venezia, Italy
- Height: 1.84 m (6 ft 1/2 in)
- Weight: 71 kg (157 lb)
- Spike: 305 cm (120 in)
- Block: 298 cm (117 in)

Volleyball information
- Position: Setter
- Current club: (Azerbaijan) Igtisadchi Baku
- Number: 18

Career
- Years: Team
- 2013–2014: (Azerbaijan) Igtisadchi Baku

National team
- Years: Team
- 1999–present: (Italy) ITA
- Updated on October 2013

Valentina Serena (born 10 November 1981, in Oderzo) is an Italian professional volleyball player, playing as a setter. She now plays for Igtisadchi Baku in Azerbaijan.

== Career ==
She has been playing professionally across Europe for several years, in 2012/2013 season she helped her team to win the CEV Champion Cup, the victory over Fenerbahçe in the finals.

== Clubs ==
- (Italy) San Dona 1996–1998
- (Italy) Rinascita Fireze 1998–1999
- (Italy) Granzotto San Dona 1999–2000
- (Italy) Johnson Matthey Spezzano 2000–2001
- (Italy) Famila Imola 2001–2002
- (Italy) Cuneo Volley 2002–2003
- (Italy) Conegliano 2003–2004
- (Italy) Pallavolo Sassuolo 2004–2005
- (Italy) Lines Altamura 2005–2006
- (Italy) Zoppas Industries Conegliano 2006–2009
- (Turkey) Ancaragucu 2009–2010
- (Italy) Foppapedretti Bergamo 2009–2010
- (Italy) Futura Volley Busto Arsizio 2010–2011
- (Italy) Foppapedretti Bergamo 2011–2012
- (Poland) Bank BPS Muszynianka Fakro Muszyna 2012–2013
- (Azerbaijan) Igtisadchi Baku 2013–2014

== Awards ==
=== Clubs ===
- 2012-13 CEV Cup - Champion, with Bank BPS Muszynianka Fakro Muszyna
- 2013-14 Azerbaijan Super League - 3rd place, with Igtisadchi Baku
