= Raffaella Calloni =

Italian volleyball player (born 1983)

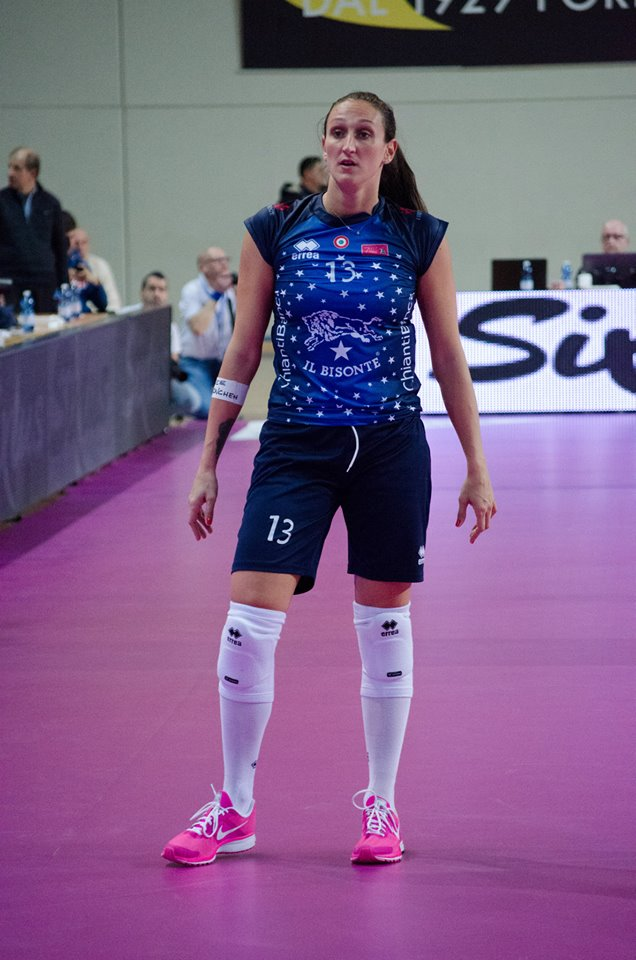

Personal information
- Nationality: Italian
- Born: 4 May 1983 (age 43)
- Height: 1.84 m (72 in)
- Weight: 70 kg (154 lb)
- Spike: 302 cm (119 in)
- Block: 283 cm (111 in)

Volleyball information
- Position: Middle-blocker
- Number: 13 (national team)

Career
Years	Teams
2015	(Italy) San Casciano Volley

National team
2015	Italy

Raffaella Calloni (born 4 May 1983) is an Italian female former volleyball player, who played as a middle-blocker. She was part of the Italy women's national volleyball team.

She competed at the 2015 European Games in Baku. On club level she played for San Casciano Volley in 2015. In 2018 she announced her retirement.
