= Supercoppa Italiana (women's volleyball) =

Women's volleyball competition in Italy

- Sport: Volleyball
- Founded: 1996; 30 years ago
- Administrator: FIPAV
- Country: Italy
- Continent: Europe
- Most recent champion: Imoco Volley (9 titles)
- Most titles: Imoco Volley (9 titles)
- Related competitions: Serie A1 (qualifier); Coppa Italia (qualifier)
- Website: legavolleyfemminile.it

The Italian Women's Volleyball Super Cup (in Italian: Supercoppa Italiana di pallavolo femminile) is an Italian women's volleyball competition organized since 1996 by the Lega Volley Femminile. The Supercoppa Italiana is played between the winners of the Serie A1 and the Coppa Italia from the previous season. If the winners are the same team it's played between the winner of the Serie A1 and the runner-up of the Coppa Italia.

== Results ==
Year	Winner	Score	Runner-up
1996	Foppapedretti Bergamo	3–2 (5–15, 15–10, 15–9, 8–15, 15–11)	Anthesis Volley Modena
1997	Foppapedretti Bergamo	3–0 (15–8, 15–8, 15–8)	Omnitel Volley Modena
1998	Foppapedretti Bergamo	3–2 (15–12, 11–15, 3–15, 16–14, 15–12)	Ceramica Reggio Emilia
1999	Foppapedretti Bergamo	3–0 (25–19, 25–22, 25–19)	Despar Perugia
2000	Capo Sud Reggio Calabria	3–2 (25–22, 21–25, 16–25, 25–20, 15–12)	Edison Modena
2001	Minetti Vicenza	3–0 (25–15, 25–22, 25–12)	Radio 105 Foppapedretti Bergamo
2002	Volley Modena	3–0 (25–18, 25–20, 26–24)	Radio 105 Foppapedretti Bergamo
2003	Sant'Orsola Asystel Novara	3–0 (25–22, 25–16, 25–19)	Despar Sirio Perugia
2004	Radio 105 Foppapedretti Bergamo	3–0 (25–18, 25–11, 25–20)	Colussi Perugia
2005	Sant'Orsola Asystel Novara	3–2 (27–25, 26–24, 20–25, 23–25, 15–6)	Radio 105 Foppapedretti Bergamo
2006	Scavolini Pesaro	3–0 (25–19, 25–23, 25–22)	Sant'Orsola Asystel Novara
2007	Despar Perugia	3–0 (25–21, 25–21, 25–14)	Monte Schiavo Banca Marche Jesi
2008	Scavolini Pesaro	3–1 (27–25, 25–17, 19–25, 25–18)	Foppapedretti Bergamo
2009	Scavolini Pesaro	3–2 (25–19, 18–25, 25–21, 23–25, 15–13)	Asystel Volley Novara
2010	Scavolini Pesaro	3–0 (25–20, 25–20, 25–19)	MC Carnaghi Villa Cortese
2011	Norda Foppapedretti Bergamo	3–2 (25–20, 20–25, 17–25, 25–22, 15–13)	MC Carnaghi Villa Cortese
2012	Unendo Yamamay Busto Arsizio	3–2 (20–25, 25–21, 21–25, 25–21, 15–12)	Asystel MC Carnaghi Villa Cortese
2013	Rebecchi Nordmeccanica Piacenza	3–0 (25–22, 25–10, 25–10)	Imoco Volley Conegliano
2014	Nordmeccanica Rebecchi Piacenza	3–2 (15–25, 25–16, 25–27, 25–19, 15–11)	Unendo Yamamay Busto Arsizio
2015	Pomì Casalmaggiore	3–2 (17–25, 25–22, 25–23, 20–25, 17–15)	Igor Gorgonzola Novara
2016	Imoco Volley Conegliano	3–1 (22–25, 25–18, 25–22, 25–22)	Foppapedretti Bergamo
2017	Igor Gorgonzola Novara	3–2 (25–19, 25–27, 22–25, 25–23, 16–14)	Imoco Volley Conegliano
2018	Imoco Volley Conegliano	3–1 (25–21, 25–17, 17–25, 25–23)	Igor Gorgonzola Novara
2019	Imoco Volley Conegliano	3–0 (25–20, 25–17, 25–21)	Igor Gorgonzola Novara
2020	Imoco Volley Conegliano	3–0 (25–16, 25–15, 25–15)	Unet E-Work Busto Arsizio
2021	Imoco Volley Conegliano	3–1 (23–25, 29–27, 25–15, 26–24)	Igor Gorgonzola Novara
2022	Imoco Volley Conegliano	3–1 (25–23, 17–25, 25–17, 25–17)	Igor Gorgonzola Novara
2023	Imoco Volley Conegliano	3–1 (26–24, 21–25, 25–23, 25–20)	Vero Volley Milano
2024	Imoco Volley Conegliano	3–2 (20–25, 25–16, 21–25, 25–23, 15–11)	Vero Volley Milano
2025	Vero Volley Milano	3–2 (18–25, 25–22, 25–20, 13–25, 15–12)	Imoco Volley Conegliano
2026	Imoco Volley Conegliano	3–1 (23–25, 25–18, 26–24, 26–24)	Savino Del Bene Scandicci

== Titles by club ==
Rk.	Club	Titles	City	Years won
1	Imoco Volley	9	Conegliano	2016, 2018, 2019, 2020, 2021, 2022, 2023, 2024, 2026
2	Volley Bergamo	6	Bergamo	1996, 1997, 1998, 1999, 2004, 2011
3	Robursport Volley Pesaro	4	Pesaro	2006, 2008, 2009, 2010
4	Asystel Volley	2	Novara	2003, 2005
=	River Volley	2	Piacenza	2013, 2014
6	Virtus Reggio Calabria	1	Reggio Calabria	2000
=	Vicenza Volley	1	Vicenza	2001
=	Volley Modena	1	Modena	2002
=	Pallavolo Sirio Perugia	1	Perugia	2007
=	Unet E-Work Busto Arsizio	1	Busto Arsizio	2012
=	Volleyball Casalmaggiore	1	Casalmaggiore	2015
=	AGIL Volley	1	Novara	2017
=	Vero Volley Milano	1	Milan	2025
