= 2024–25 Italian Women's Volleyball League =

2024–25 Italian Women's Serie A1
- League: Italian Women's Volleyball League
- Sport: Volleyball
- Duration: 5 October 2024 – 22 April 2025
- Teams: 14

Regular Season
- Season champions: Prosecco Doc Imoco Conegliano
- Top scorer: Ekaterina Antropova

Finals
- Champions: Prosecco Doc Imoco Conegliano
- Runners-up: Numia Vero Volley Milano
- Finals MVP: Gabriela Guimarães

Italian Women's Volleyball League seasons
- ← 2023–24 2025–26 →

The 2024–25 Serie A1 was the 80th season of the highest professional Italian Women's Volleyball League. The season took place from October to April and was contested by fourteen teams.

== Format ==
The regular season consists of 26 rounds, where the fourteen participating teams play each other twice (once home and once away). At the completion of the regular season, the eight best teams advance to the championship playoffs, the 9-12th ranked teams advance to the challenge playoffs and the teams finishing 13th and 14th are relegated to Serie A2.

The standings criteria:

- highest number of result points (points awarded for results: 3 points for 3–0 or 3–1 wins, 2 points for 3–2 win, 1 point for 2–3 loss);
- highest number of matches won;
- highest set quotient (the number of total sets won divided by the number of total sets lost);
- highest points quotient (the number of total points scored divided by the number of total points conceded).

== Teams ==
Club	Venue	Capacity	City/Area	Club locations in Italy (2024–25 season).
Bartoccini-Mc Restauri Perugia	PalaBarton	4,000	Perugia	Club locations in Italy (2024–25 season).
Bergamo	PalaFacchetti	2,880	Treviglio	Club locations in Italy (2024–25 season).
Cda Volley Talmassons Fvg	Palasport Latisana	1,500	Latisana	Club locations in Italy (2024–25 season).
Eurotek Uyba Busto Arsizio	E-Work Arena	4,490	Busto Arsizio	Club locations in Italy (2024–25 season).
Honda Olivero Cuneo	PalaCastagnaretta	4,700	Cuneo	Club locations in Italy (2024–25 season).
Igor Gorgonzola Novara	Pala Igor Gorgonzola	4,000	Novara	Club locations in Italy (2024–25 season).
Il Bisonte Firenze	PalaWanny	3,500	Florence	Club locations in Italy (2024–25 season).
Megabox Ond. Savio Vallefoglia	PalaMegabox	2,001	Pesaro	Club locations in Italy (2024–25 season).
Numia Vero Volley Milano	Allianz Cloud Arena	5,309	Milan	Club locations in Italy (2024–25 season).
Prosecco Doc Imoco Conegliano	PalaVerde	5,344	Villorba	Club locations in Italy (2024–25 season).
Reale Mutua Fenera Chieri '76	PalaFenera	1,506	Chieri	Club locations in Italy (2024–25 season).
Savino Del Bene Scandicci	PalaWanny	3,500	Florence	Club locations in Italy (2024–25 season).
Smi Roma Volley	Palazzetto dello Sport	3,300	Rome	Club locations in Italy (2024–25 season).
Wash4Green Pinerolo	Pala Bus Company	1,500	Pinerolo	Club locations in Italy (2024–25 season).

== Regular season ==
=== League table ===
Pos	Team	Pld	W	L	Pts	SW	SL	SR	SPW	SPL	SPR	Qualification or relegation
1	Prosecco Doc Imoco Conegliano	26	26	0	77	78	7	11.143	2095	1614	1.298	Championship playoffs
2	Numia Vero Volley Milano	26	21	5	60	69	35	1.971	2396	2173	1.103	Championship playoffs
3	Savino Del Bene Scandicci	26	19	7	58	63	33	1.909	2237	2071	1.080	Championship playoffs
4	Igor Gorgonzola Novara	26	20	6	56	67	38	1.763	2411	2171	1.111	Championship playoffs
5	Reale Mutua Fenera Chieri '76	26	16	10	43	54	46	1.174	2232	2200	1.015	Championship playoffs
6	Eurotek Uyba Busto Arsizio	26	15	11	41	49	48	1.021	2122	2108	1.007	Championship playoffs
7	Megabox Ond. Savio Vallefoglia	26	11	15	38	55	56	0.982	2409	2394	1.006	Championship playoffs
8	Bergamo	26	11	15	36	45	49	0.918	2115	2139	0.989	Championship playoffs
9	Wash4Green Pinerolo	26	11	15	33	41	54	0.759	2096	2209	0.949	Challenge playoffs
10	Bartoccini-Mc Restauri Perugia	26	8	18	25	38	61	0.623	2107	2315	0.910	Challenge playoffs
11	Honda Olivero Cuneo	26	8	18	24	34	63	0.540	2033	2236	0.909	Challenge playoffs
12	Il Bisonte Firenze	26	7	19	21	40	66	0.606	2270	2445	0.928	Challenge playoffs
13	Smi Roma Volley	26	6	20	20	30	65	0.462	2036	2218	0.918	Relegated to Serie A2
14	Cda Volley Talmassons Fvg	26	3	23	14	28	70	0.400	2069	2335	0.886	Relegated to Serie A2

Source: Lega Volley Femminile

=== Results table ===
Home \ Away	PER	BER	TAL	BUS	CUN	NOV	FIR	VAL	MIL	CON	CHI	SCA	ROM	PIN
Bartoccini-Mc Restauri Perugia		0–3	3–0	2–3	3–0	3–2	3–1	2–3	1–3	0–3	2–3	1–3	0–3	1–3
Bergamo	3–0		1–3	3–0	3–0	2–3	2–3	3–1	1–3	0–3	1–3	1–3	3–0	1–3
Cda Volley Talmassons Fvg	0–3	0–3		2–3	1–3	0–3	1–3	1–3	1–3	0–3	2–3	1–3	1–3	3–0
Eurotek Uyba Busto Arsizio	3–1	1–3	3–2		3–0	3–0	3–1	3–1	0–3	0–3	0–3	3–1	1–3	3–2
Honda Olivero Cuneo	3–1	3–2	3–1	0–3		3–1	0–3	2–3	2–3	0–3	0–3	1–3	3–1	3–0
Igor Gorgonzola Novara	3–1	3–0	3–2	3–0	3–1		3–1	3–2	3–2	2–3	3–0	3–2	3–0	3–0
Il Bisonte Firenze	1–3	1–3	0–3	2–3	2–3	1–3		3–2	1–3	1–3	1–3	0–3	3–2	3–0
Megabox Ond. Savio Vallefoglia	3–1	3–1	3–2	3–0	3–1	2–3	2–3		2–3	0–3	2–3	1–3	3–0	2–3
Numia Vero Volley Milano	3–0	3–0	3–0	3–2	3–0	2–3	3–2	3–2		0–3	3–1	3–2	3–0	3–1
Prosecco Doc Imoco Conegliano	3–0	3–0	3–0	3–0	3–0	3–0	3–0	3–1	3–0		3–0	3–0	3–1	3–0
Reale Mutua Fenera Chieri '76	1–3	3–0	3–1	0–3	3–1	3–2	3–2	3–1	1–3	1–3		0–3	3–1	3–0
Savino Del Bene Scandicci	3–0	3–0	3–0	3–0	3–0	1–3	3–1	0–3	3–2	0–3	3–1		3–0	3–1
Smi Roma Volley	2–3	1–3	3–1	0–3	3–1	0–3	3–1	1–3	0–3	1–3	0–3	1–3		1–3
Wash4Green Pinerolo	3–1	0–3	3–0	1–3	3–1	1–3	3–0	3–1	1–3	0–3	3–1	1–3	3–0	

Source: Lega Volley Femminile
Legend: Blue = left column team win; Red = top row team win.

=== Fixtures and results ===
- All times are local, CEST (UTC+02:00) between 5 October and 26 October 2024 and CET (UTC+01:00) from 27 October 2024.

Round 1

Date	Time		Score		Set 1	Set 2	Set 3	Set 4	Set 5	Total	Report
5 Oct	20:30	Savino Del Bene Scandicci	3–0	Honda Olivero Cuneo	25–18	25–18	26–24			76–60	Report
6 Oct	16:30	Wash4Green Pinerolo	1–3	Numia Vero Volley Milano	40–38	20–25	21–25	20–25		101–113	Report
6 Oct	17:00	Il Bisonte Firenze	3–2	Megabox Ond. Savio Vallefoglia	27–25	21–25	19–25	27–25	15–12	109–112	Report
6 Oct	17:00	Bartoccini-Mc Restauri Perugia	0–3	Bergamo	22–25	23–25	19–25			64–75	Report
6 Oct	17:00	Smi Roma Volley	3–1	Cda Volley Talmassons Fvg	26–28	30–28	25–20	25–19		106–95	Report
6 Oct	17:30	Reale Mutua Fenera Chieri '76	3–2	Igor Gorgonzola Novara	25–22	16–25	25–22	15–25	15–11	96–105	Report
6 Oct	18:00	Prosecco Doc Imoco Conegliano	3–0	Eurotek Uyba Busto Arsizio	25–15	25–22	25–14			75–51	Report

Round 2

Date	Time		Score		Set 1	Set 2	Set 3	Set 4	Set 5	Total	Report
12 Oct	20:30	Numia Vero Volley Milano	3–0	Smi Roma Volley	25–19	25–18	25–15			75–52	Report
13 Oct	16:30	Igor Gorgonzola Novara	3–0	Wash4Green Pinerolo	25–23	25–22	25–21			75–66	Report
13 Oct	17:00	Cda Volley Talmassons Fvg	0–3	Prosecco Doc Imoco Conegliano	23–25	20–25	18–25			61–75	Report
13 Oct	17:00	Honda Olivero Cuneo	0–3	Reale Mutua Fenera Chieri '76	21–25	26–28	18–25			65–78	Report
13 Oct	17:00	Bartoccini-Mc Restauri Perugia	2–3	Megabox Ond. Savio Vallefoglia	12–25	25–19	30–32	25–15	17–19	109–110	Report
13 Oct	17:00	Eurotek Uyba Busto Arsizio	1–3	Bergamo	16–25	25–18	23–25	17–25		81–93	Report
13 Oct	18:00	Il Bisonte Firenze	0–3	Savino Del Bene Scandicci	22–25	22–25	23–25			67–75	Report

Round 3

Date	Time		Score		Set 1	Set 2	Set 3	Set 4	Set 5	Total	Report
19 Oct	18:00	Wash4Green Pinerolo	3–1	Honda Olivero Cuneo	25–23	19–25	25–18	25–23		94–89	Report
20 Oct	16:00	Numia Vero Volley Milano	2–3	Igor Gorgonzola Novara	21–25	32–30	22–25	31–29	12–15	118–124	Report
20 Oct	16:30	Smi Roma Volley	1–3	Prosecco Doc Imoco Conegliano	23–25	17–25	25–23	20–25		85–98	Report
20 Oct	17:00	Reale Mutua Fenera Chieri '76	3–2	Il Bisonte Firenze	25–13	25–23	22–25	17–25	15–12	104–98	Report
20 Oct	17:00	Savino Del Bene Scandicci	3–0	Bartoccini-Mc Restauri Perugia	25–15	25–21	25–15			75–51	Report
20 Oct	17:30	Bergamo	1–3	Cda Volley Talmassons Fvg	25–27	25–20	23–25	18–25		91–97	Report
20 Oct	18:00	Megabox Ond. Savio Vallefoglia	3–0	Eurotek Uyba Busto Arsizio	25–21	25–18	25–15			75–54	Report

Round 4

Date	Time		Score		Set 1	Set 2	Set 3	Set 4	Set 5	Total	Report
26 Oct	18:00	Il Bisonte Firenze	3–0	Wash4Green Pinerolo	25–23	25–17	25–22			75–62	Report
26 Oct	18:30	Igor Gorgonzola Novara	3–0	Smi Roma Volley	25–21	25–18	25–17			75–56	Report
26 Oct	20:30	Bartoccini-Mc Restauri Perugia	2–3	Reale Mutua Fenera Chieri '76	18–25	25–22	14–25	32–30	9–15	98–117	Report
27 Oct	17:00	Prosecco Doc Imoco Conegliano	3–0	Bergamo	25–13	25–17	25–23			75–53	Report
27 Oct	17:00	Eurotek Uyba Busto Arsizio	3–1	Savino Del Bene Scandicci	25–22	23–25	25–20	25–20		98–87	Report
27 Oct	17:00	Cda Volley Talmassons Fvg	1–3	Megabox Ond. Savio Vallefoglia	25–23	13–25	13–25	19–25		70–98	Report
27 Oct	20:30	Honda Olivero Cuneo	2–3	Numia Vero Volley Milano	25–23	13–25	18–25	25–21	12–15	93–109	Report

Round 5

Date	Time		Score		Set 1	Set 2	Set 3	Set 4	Set 5	Total	Report
29 Oct	20:30	Wash4Green Pinerolo	3–1	Bartoccini-Mc Restauri Perugia	25–19	25–20	23–25	25–18		98–82	Report
30 Oct	20:30	Igor Gorgonzola Novara	3–1	Honda Olivero Cuneo	25–22	25–12	19–25	25–11		94–70	Report
30 Oct	20:30	Numia Vero Volley Milano	3–2	Il Bisonte Firenze	25–16	23–25	21–25	25–20	15–13	109–99	Report
30 Oct	20:30	Reale Mutua Fenera Chieri '76	0–3	Eurotek Uyba Busto Arsizio	22–25	23–25	23–25			68–75	Report
30 Oct	20:30	Smi Roma Volley	1–3	Bergamo	18–25	21–25	25–19	18–25		82–94	Report
30 Oct	20:30	Savino Del Bene Scandicci	3–0	Cda Volley Talmassons Fvg	25–18	25–21	25–13			75–52	Report
30 Oct	20:45	Megabox Ond. Savio Vallefoglia	0–3	Prosecco Doc Imoco Conegliano	19–25	19–25	12–25			50–75	Report

Round 6

Date	Time		Score		Set 1	Set 2	Set 3	Set 4	Set 5	Total	Report
2 Nov	20:30	Bartoccini-Mc Restauri Perugia	1–3	Numia Vero Volley Milano	21–25	19–25	25–22	17–25		82–97	Report
3 Nov	16:00	Il Bisonte Firenze	1–3	Igor Gorgonzola Novara	21–25	25–21	21–25	18–25		85–96	Report
3 Nov	17:00	Eurotek Uyba Busto Arsizio	3–2	Wash4Green Pinerolo	22–25	29–27	25–13	20–25	15–8	111–98	Report
3 Nov	17:00	Honda Olivero Cuneo	3–1	Smi Roma Volley	22–25	25–19	25–15	25–22		97–81	Report
3 Nov	17:00	Cda Volley Talmassons Fvg	2–3	Reale Mutua Fenera Chieri '76	18–25	25–21	18–25	26–24	10–15	97–110	Report
3 Nov	17:00	Bergamo	3–1	Megabox Ond. Savio Vallefoglia	17–25	25–23	26–24	25–20		93–92	Report
3 Nov	18:00	Prosecco Doc Imoco Conegliano	3–0	Savino Del Bene Scandicci	25–20	25–23	30–28			80–71	Report

Round 7

Date	Time		Score		Set 1	Set 2	Set 3	Set 4	Set 5	Total	Report
9 Nov	20:30	Igor Gorgonzola Novara	3–1	Bartoccini-Mc Restauri Perugia	22–25	25–22	25–17	25–22		97–86	Report
10 Nov	15:20	Reale Mutua Fenera Chieri '76	1–3	Prosecco Doc Imoco Conegliano	16–25	23–25	25–23	21–25		85–98	Report
10 Nov	16:30	Savino Del Bene Scandicci	3–0	Bergamo	25–22	25–18	25–21			75–61	Report
10 Nov	17:00	Wash4Green Pinerolo	3–0	Cda Volley Talmassons Fvg	26–24	25–18	25–20			76–62	Report
10 Nov	17:00	Smi Roma Volley	1–3	Megabox Ond. Savio Vallefoglia	20–25	25–22	23–25	14–25		82–97	Report
10 Nov	18:00	Numia Vero Volley Milano	3–2	Eurotek Uyba Busto Arsizio	25–18	18–25	25–20	18–25	15–10	101–98	Report
11 Dec	19:00	Honda Olivero Cuneo	0–3	Il Bisonte Firenze	19–25	26–28	20–25			65–78	Report

Round 8

Date	Time		Score		Set 1	Set 2	Set 3	Set 4	Set 5	Total	Report
16 Nov	18:00	Bergamo	1–3	Reale Mutua Fenera Chieri '76	17–25	25–20	20–25	18–25		80–95	Report
17 Nov	16:00	Megabox Ond. Savio Vallefoglia	1–3	Savino Del Bene Scandicci	25–16	20–25	22–25	20–25		87–91	Report
17 Nov	17:00	Prosecco Doc Imoco Conegliano	3–0	Wash4Green Pinerolo	25–21	25–15	25–14			75–50	Report
17 Nov	17:00	Eurotek Uyba Busto Arsizio	3–0	Igor Gorgonzola Novara	25–17	25–21	25–14			75–52	Report
17 Nov	17:00	Il Bisonte Firenze	3–2	Smi Roma Volley	17–25	25–20	29–27	17–25	15–13	103–110	Report
17 Nov	18:00	Cda Volley Talmassons Fvg	1–3	Numia Vero Volley Milano	25–22	21–25	30–32	23–25		99–104	Report
17 Nov	18:30	Bartoccini-Mc Restauri Perugia	3–0	Honda Olivero Cuneo	25–22	25–14	25–21			75–57	Report

Round 9

Date	Time		Score		Set 1	Set 2	Set 3	Set 4	Set 5	Total	Report
22 Nov	20:30	Numia Vero Volley Milano	0–3	Prosecco Doc Imoco Conegliano	20–25	18–25	15–25			53–75	Report
23 Nov	18:00	Igor Gorgonzola Novara	3–2	Cda Volley Talmassons Fvg	23–25	25–12	25–21	15–25	18–16	106–99	Report
23 Nov	18:00	Smi Roma Volley	1–3	Savino Del Bene Scandicci	22–25	25–16	17–25	21–25		85–91	Report
24 Nov	16:00	Reale Mutua Fenera Chieri '76	3–1	Megabox Ond. Savio Vallefoglia	23–25	25–20	25–20	25–13		98–78	Report
24 Nov	17:00	Wash4Green Pinerolo	0–3	Bergamo	17–25	23–25	20–25			60–75	Report
24 Nov	17:00	Honda Olivero Cuneo	0–3	Eurotek Uyba Busto Arsizio	23–25	18–25	14–25			55–75	Report
24 Nov	20:30	Il Bisonte Firenze	1–3	Bartoccini-Mc Restauri Perugia	25–15	24–26	17–25	22–25		88–91	Report

Round 10

Date	Time		Score		Set 1	Set 2	Set 3	Set 4	Set 5	Total	Report
30 Nov	20:30	Eurotek Uyba Busto Arsizio	3–1	Il Bisonte Firenze	17–25	25–20	25–15	25–19		92–79	Report
1 Dec	16:00	Savino Del Bene Scandicci	3–1	Reale Mutua Fenera Chieri '76	25–16	21–25	25–18	25–12		96–71	Report
1 Dec	17:00	Megabox Ond. Savio Vallefoglia	2–3	Wash4Green Pinerolo	20–25	23–25	25–22	25–20	20–22	113–114	Report
1 Dec	17:00	Cda Volley Talmassons Fvg	1–3	Honda Olivero Cuneo	20–25	25–15	20–25	23–25		88–90	Report
1 Dec	17:00	Bartoccini-Mc Restauri Perugia	0–3	Smi Roma Volley	22–25	20–25	16–25			58–75	Report
1 Dec	17:00	Bergamo	1–3	Numia Vero Volley Milano	20–25	21–25	25–22	22–25		88–97	Report
1 Dec	18:00	Prosecco Doc Imoco Conegliano	3–0	Igor Gorgonzola Novara	25–21	25–16	25–23			75–60	Report

Round 11

Date	Time		Score		Set 1	Set 2	Set 3	Set 4	Set 5	Total	Report
4 Dec	19:30	Numia Vero Volley Milano	3–2	Megabox Ond. Savio Vallefoglia	30–28	19–25	24–26	25–20	15–9	113–108	Report
4 Dec	20:30	Wash4Green Pinerolo	1–3	Savino Del Bene Scandicci	25–21	23–25	23–25	25–27		96–98	Report
4 Dec	20:30	Honda Olivero Cuneo	0–3	Prosecco Doc Imoco Conegliano	20–25	17–25	18–25			55–75	Report
4 Dec	20:30	Igor Gorgonzola Novara	3–0	Bergamo	25–22	25–22	25–19			75–63	Report
4 Dec	20:30	Il Bisonte Firenze	0–3	Cda Volley Talmassons Fvg	19–25	26–28	24–26			69–79	Report
4 Dec	20:30	Eurotek Uyba Busto Arsizio	3–1	Bartoccini-Mc Restauri Perugia	30–28	25–22	23–25	25–18		103–93	Report
4 Dec	20:30	Reale Mutua Fenera Chieri '76	3–1	Smi Roma Volley	25–22	25–21	23–25	25–16		98–84	Report

Round 12

Date	Time		Score		Set 1	Set 2	Set 3	Set 4	Set 5	Total	Report
7 Dec	18:00	Megabox Ond. Savio Vallefoglia	2–3	Igor Gorgonzola Novara	29–27	17–25	17–25	25–23	17–19	105–119	Report
7 Dec	19:00	Prosecco Doc Imoco Conegliano	3–0	Il Bisonte Firenze	25–12	25–22	25–13			75–47	Report
8 Dec	16:00	Cda Volley Talmassons Fvg	0–3	Bartoccini-Mc Restauri Perugia	22–25	23–25	20–25			65–75	Report
8 Dec	17:00	Reale Mutua Fenera Chieri '76	3–0	Wash4Green Pinerolo	25–6	25–21	25–23			75–50	Report
8 Dec	17:00	Bergamo	3–0	Honda Olivero Cuneo	25–20	25–18	25–23			75–61	Report
8 Dec	17:00	Smi Roma Volley	0–3	Eurotek Uyba Busto Arsizio	17–25	20–25	23–25			60–75	Report
8 Dec	18:00	Savino Del Bene Scandicci	3–2	Numia Vero Volley Milano	20–25	25–21	22–25	25–20	15–12	107–103	Report

Round 13

Date	Time		Score		Set 1	Set 2	Set 3	Set 4	Set 5	Total	Report
16 Oct	20:30	Numia Vero Volley Milano	3–1	Reale Mutua Fenera Chieri '76	25–20	26–24	25–27	25–14		101–85	Report
17 Oct	20:30	Bartoccini-Mc Restauri Perugia	0–3	Prosecco Doc Imoco Conegliano	14–25	17–25	21–25			52–75	Report
14 Dec	20:45	Cda Volley Talmassons Fvg	2–3	Eurotek Uyba Busto Arsizio	26–24	20–25	21–25	25–21	12–15	104–110	Report
15 Dec	15:30	Igor Gorgonzola Novara	3–2	Savino Del Bene Scandicci	24–26	25–13	25–19	22–25	15–10	111–93	Report
15 Dec	16:00	Honda Olivero Cuneo	2–3	Megabox Ond. Savio Vallefoglia	23–25	25–18	27–25	13–25	12–15	100–108	Report
15 Dec	17:00	Il Bisonte Firenze	1–3	Bergamo	26–24	20–25	23–25	17–25		86–99	Report
15 Dec	17:30	Wash4Green Pinerolo	3–0	Smi Roma Volley	25–15	25–23	25–18			75–56	Report

Round 14

Date	Time		Score		Set 1	Set 2	Set 3	Set 4	Set 5	Total	Report
21 Dec	20:30	Megabox Ond. Savio Vallefoglia	2–3	Il Bisonte Firenze	24–26	25–19	25–22	19–25	12–15	105–107	Report
22 Dec	15:30	Igor Gorgonzola Novara	3–0	Reale Mutua Fenera Chieri '76	25–18	28–26	25–20			78–64	Report
22 Dec	16:00	Honda Olivero Cuneo	1–3	Savino Del Bene Scandicci	25–16	19–25	25–27	15–25		84–93	Report
22 Dec	17:00	Cda Volley Talmassons Fvg	1–3	Smi Roma Volley	25–21	20–25	20–25	22–25		87–96	Report
22 Dec	17:30	Bergamo	3–0	Bartoccini-Mc Restauri Perugia	25–20	25–20	25–23			75–63	Report
29 Jan	20:00	Numia Vero Volley Milano	3–1	Wash4Green Pinerolo	24–26	25–20	25–19	25–17		99–82	Report
29 Jan	20:30	Eurotek Uyba Busto Arsizio	0–3	Prosecco Doc Imoco Conegliano	15–25	22–25	19–25			56–75	Report

Round 15

Date	Time		Score		Set 1	Set 2	Set 3	Set 4	Set 5	Total	Report
26 Dec	15:30	Bergamo	3–0	Eurotek Uyba Busto Arsizio	26–24	25–18	25–21			76–63	Report
26 Dec	16:00	Wash4Green Pinerolo	1–3	Igor Gorgonzola Novara	29–27	19–25	18–25	23–25		89–102	Report
26 Dec	17:00	Prosecco Doc Imoco Conegliano	3–0	Cda Volley Talmassons Fvg	25–22	25–19	28–26			78–67	Report
26 Dec	17:00	Reale Mutua Fenera Chieri '76	3–1	Honda Olivero Cuneo	25–18	19–25	25–19	25–20		94–82	Report
26 Dec	17:00	Megabox Ond. Savio Vallefoglia	3–1	Bartoccini-Mc Restauri Perugia	19–25	25–17	25–23	25–19		94–84	Report
26 Dec	17:00	Smi Roma Volley	0–3	Numia Vero Volley Milano	21–25	23–25	23–25			67–75	Report
26 Dec	18:00	Savino Del Bene Scandicci	3–1	Il Bisonte Firenze	27–29	25–18	25–13	25–18		102–78	Report

Round 16

Date	Time		Score		Set 1	Set 2	Set 3	Set 4	Set 5	Total	Report
4 Jan	20:30	Bartoccini-Mc Restauri Perugia	1–3	Savino Del Bene Scandicci	28–30	22–25	26–24	22–25		98–104	Report
5 Jan	16:00	Prosecco Doc Imoco Conegliano	3–1	Smi Roma Volley	19–25	25–12	25–22	26–24		95–83	Report
5 Jan	17:00	Il Bisonte Firenze	1–3	Reale Mutua Fenera Chieri '76	22–25	25–23	20–25	20–25		87–98	Report
5 Jan	17:00	Eurotek Uyba Busto Arsizio	3–1	Megabox Ond. Savio Vallefoglia	25–11	17–25	25–16	29–27		96–79	Report
5 Jan	17:00	Cda Volley Talmassons Fvg	0–3	Bergamo	21–25	20–25	15–25			56–75	Report
5 Jan	18:00	Honda Olivero Cuneo	3–0	Wash4Green Pinerolo	25–12	26–24	25–19			76–55	Report
5 Jan	20:30	Igor Gorgonzola Novara	3–2	Numia Vero Volley Milano	19–25	25–14	25–23	23–25	15–12	107–99	Report

Round 17

Date	Time		Score		Set 1	Set 2	Set 3	Set 4	Set 5	Total	Report
11 Jan	19:30	Numia Vero Volley Milano	3–0	Honda Olivero Cuneo	25–15	25–23	25–22			75–60	Report
11 Jan	20:30	Megabox Ond. Savio Vallefoglia	3–2	Cda Volley Talmassons Fvg	30–32	25–19	25–17	19–25	15–11	114–104	Report
12 Jan	15:30	Bergamo	0–3	Prosecco Doc Imoco Conegliano	22–25	20–25	21–25			63–75	Report
12 Jan	16:00	Smi Roma Volley	0–3	Igor Gorgonzola Novara	14–25	27–29	17–25			58–79	Report
12 Jan	17:00	Wash4Green Pinerolo	3–0	Il Bisonte Firenze	25–21	25–18	25–22			75–61	Report
12 Jan	17:00	Reale Mutua Fenera Chieri '76	1–3	Bartoccini-Mc Restauri Perugia	23–25	25–23	21–25	21–25		90–98	Report
12 Jan	18:00	Savino Del Bene Scandicci	3–0	Eurotek Uyba Busto Arsizio	25–18	25–14	25–17			75–49	Report

Round 18

Date	Time		Score		Set 1	Set 2	Set 3	Set 4	Set 5	Total	Report
15 Jan	20:00	Il Bisonte Firenze	1–3	Numia Vero Volley Milano	20–25	25–22	17–25	21–25		83–97	Report
15 Jan	20:30	Bartoccini-Mc Restauri Perugia	1–3	Wash4Green Pinerolo	26–28	25–23	17–25	15–25		83–101	Report
15 Jan	20:30	Prosecco Doc Imoco Conegliano	3–1	Megabox Ond. Savio Vallefoglia	25–16	25–18	22–25	25–19		97–78	Report
15 Jan	20:30	Honda Olivero Cuneo	3–1	Igor Gorgonzola Novara	24–26	25–22	26–24	25–21		100–93	Report
15 Jan	20:30	Eurotek Uyba Busto Arsizio	0–3	Reale Mutua Fenera Chieri '76	22–25	20–25	22–25			64–75	Report
15 Jan	20:30	Bergamo	3–0	Smi Roma Volley	25–20	25–21	25–18			75–59	Report
15 Jan	20:30	Cda Volley Talmassons Fvg	1–3	Savino Del Bene Scandicci	25–19	19–25	17–25	22–25		83–94	Report

Round 19

Date	Time		Score		Set 1	Set 2	Set 3	Set 4	Set 5	Total	Report
18 Jan	18:00	Savino Del Bene Scandicci	0–3	Prosecco Doc Imoco Conegliano	21–25	14–25	13–25			48–75	Report
18 Jan	20:30	Numia Vero Volley Milano	3–0	Bartoccini-Mc Restauri Perugia	25–16	25–15	25–16			75–47	Report
19 Jan	16:00	Reale Mutua Fenera Chieri '76	3–1	Cda Volley Talmassons Fvg	23–25	25–23	25–23	29–27		102–98	Report
19 Jan	17:00	Wash4Green Pinerolo	1–3	Eurotek Uyba Busto Arsizio	19–25	25–22	17–25	20–25		81–97	Report
19 Jan	17:00	Igor Gorgonzola Novara	3–1	Il Bisonte Firenze	23–25	25–22	25–18	27–25		100–90	Report
19 Jan	17:00	Smi Roma Volley	3–1	Honda Olivero Cuneo	22–25	25–18	25–23	25–14		97–80	Report
19 Jan	18:00	Megabox Ond. Savio Vallefoglia	3–1	Bergamo	25–19	17–25	25–17	25–23		92–84	Report

Round 20

Date	Time		Score		Set 1	Set 2	Set 3	Set 4	Set 5	Total	Report
25 Jan	21:00	Cda Volley Talmassons Fvg	3–0	Wash4Green Pinerolo	25–13	29–27	25–21			79–61	Report
26 Jan	15:00	Megabox Ond. Savio Vallefoglia	3–0	Smi Roma Volley	25–13	25–22	25–14			75–49	Report
26 Jan	16:00	Bartoccini-Mc Restauri Perugia	3–2	Igor Gorgonzola Novara	25–18	25–22	19–25	20–25	16–14	105–104	Report
26 Jan	17:00	Il Bisonte Firenze	2–3	Honda Olivero Cuneo	25–23	18–25	25–18	16–25	9–15	93–106	Report
26 Jan	17:00	Eurotek Uyba Busto Arsizio	0–3	Numia Vero Volley Milano	22–25	23–25	16–25			61–75	Report
26 Jan	17:00	Bergamo	1–3	Savino Del Bene Scandicci	25–20	19–25	35–37	23–25		102–107	Report
26 Jan	18:00	Prosecco Doc Imoco Conegliano	3–0	Reale Mutua Fenera Chieri '76	25–18	25–19	25–17			75–54	Report

Round 21

Date	Time		Score		Set 1	Set 2	Set 3	Set 4	Set 5	Total	Report
1 Feb	18:00	Igor Gorgonzola Novara	3–0	Eurotek Uyba Busto Arsizio	25–11	25–15	25–18			75–44	Report
1 Feb	20:30	Numia Vero Volley Milano	3–0	Cda Volley Talmassons Fvg	25–19	25–15	25–10			75–44	Report
1 Feb	20:45	Reale Mutua Fenera Chieri '76	3–0	Bergamo	25–21	25–17	25–23			75–61	Report
2 Feb	16:00	Honda Olivero Cuneo	3–1	Bartoccini-Mc Restauri Perugia	25–19	20–25	25–21	25–22		95–87	Report
2 Feb	17:00	Wash4Green Pinerolo	0–3	Prosecco Doc Imoco Conegliano	17–25	10–25	14–25			41–75	Report
2 Feb	17:00	Smi Roma Volley	3–1	Il Bisonte Firenze	25–14	25–22	22–25	25–22		97–83	Report
2 Feb	17:00	Savino Del Bene Scandicci	0–3	Megabox Ond. Savio Vallefoglia	22–25	23–25	22–25			67–75	Report

Round 22

Date	Time		Score		Set 1	Set 2	Set 3	Set 4	Set 5	Total	Report
11 Feb	20:30	Megabox Ond. Savio Vallefoglia	2–3	Reale Mutua Fenera Chieri '76	25–22	24–26	25–18	12–25	7–15	93–106	Report
12 Feb	20:00	Eurotek Uyba Busto Arsizio	3–0	Honda Olivero Cuneo	25–22	25–17	25–18			75–57	Report
12 Feb	20:30	Bergamo	1–3	Wash4Green Pinerolo	24–26	25–16	23–25	24–26		96–93	Report
12 Feb	20:30	Cda Volley Talmassons Fvg	0–3	Igor Gorgonzola Novara	15–25	13–25	20–25			48–75	Report
12 Feb	20:30	Bartoccini-Mc Restauri Perugia	3–1	Il Bisonte Firenze	13–25	25–21	26–24	25–23		89–93	Report
12 Feb	20:30	Savino Del Bene Scandicci	3–0	Smi Roma Volley	25–18	25–22	25–23			75–63	Report
12 Feb	20:45	Prosecco Doc Imoco Conegliano	3–0	Numia Vero Volley Milano	25–17	25–21	25–16			75–54	Report

Round 23

Date	Time		Score		Set 1	Set 2	Set 3	Set 4	Set 5	Total	Report
15 Feb	18:00	Reale Mutua Fenera Chieri '76	0–3	Savino Del Bene Scandicci	13–25	20–25	20–25			53–75	Report
16 Feb	16:00	Igor Gorgonzola Novara	2–3	Prosecco Doc Imoco Conegliano	19–25	25–19	23–25	25–19	10–15	102–103	Report
16 Feb	17:00	Wash4Green Pinerolo	3–1	Megabox Ond. Savio Vallefoglia	25–17	19–25	25–17	25–14		94–73	Report
16 Feb	17:00	Il Bisonte Firenze	2–3	Eurotek Uyba Busto Arsizio	25–23	24–26	25–19	26–28	13–15	113–111	Report
16 Feb	17:00	Smi Roma Volley	2–3	Bartoccini-Mc Restauri Perugia	25–19	25–20	22–25	22–25	14–16	108–105	Report
16 Feb	18:00	Honda Olivero Cuneo	3–1	Cda Volley Talmassons Fvg	28–26	25–19	17–25	25–19		95–89	Report
16 Feb	19:00	Numia Vero Volley Milano	3–0	Bergamo	25–18	25–16	25–20			75–54	Report

Round 24

Date	Time		Score		Set 1	Set 2	Set 3	Set 4	Set 5	Total	Report
22 Feb	18:00	Prosecco Doc Imoco Conegliano	3–0	Honda Olivero Cuneo	25–20	25–15	25–16			75–51	Report
22 Feb	18:00	Cda Volley Talmassons Fvg	1–3	Il Bisonte Firenze	23–25	27–25	19–25	22–25		91–100	Report
22 Feb	20:30	Bartoccini-Mc Restauri Perugia	2–3	Eurotek Uyba Busto Arsizio	17–25	25–20	25–22	17–25	14–16	98–108	Report
23 Feb	16:00	Smi Roma Volley	0–3	Reale Mutua Fenera Chieri '76	16–25	22–25	26–28			64–78	Report
23 Feb	17:00	Savino Del Bene Scandicci	3–1	Wash4Green Pinerolo	25–16	19–25	25–22	32–30		101–93	Report
23 Feb	17:00	Bergamo	2–3	Igor Gorgonzola Novara	28–26	10–25	21–25	25–22	15–17	99–115	Report
23 Feb	18:00	Megabox Ond. Savio Vallefoglia	2–3	Numia Vero Volley Milano	21–25	25–23	14–25	25–12	12–15	97–100	Report

Round 25

Date	Time		Score		Set 1	Set 2	Set 3	Set 4	Set 5	Total	Report
25 Feb	20:30	Il Bisonte Firenze	1–3	Prosecco Doc Imoco Conegliano	25–21	22–25	15–25	23–25		85–96	Report
26 Feb	20:00	Bartoccini-Mc Restauri Perugia	3–0	Cda Volley Talmassons Fvg	25–21	25–21	25–19			75–61	Report
26 Feb	20:30	Wash4Green Pinerolo	3–1	Reale Mutua Fenera Chieri '76	25–20	25–18	26–28	25–16		101–82	Report
26 Feb	20:30	Igor Gorgonzola Novara	3–2	Megabox Ond. Savio Vallefoglia	25–23	20–25	16–25	25–17	15–13	101–103	Report
26 Feb	20:30	Honda Olivero Cuneo	3–2	Bergamo	25–16	20–25	24–26	25–23	18–16	112–106	Report
26 Feb	20:30	Eurotek Uyba Busto Arsizio	1–3	Smi Roma Volley	25–19	24–26	23–25	18–25		90–95	Report
26 Feb	20:30	Numia Vero Volley Milano	3–2	Savino Del Bene Scandicci	25–22	19–25	25–21	21–25	15–11	105–104	Report

Round 26

Date	Time		Score		Set 1	Set 2	Set 3	Set 4	Set 5	Total	Report
1 Mar	20:30	Smi Roma Volley	1–3	Wash4Green Pinerolo	18–25	22–25	25–15	21–25		86–90	Report
1 Mar	20:30	Prosecco Doc Imoco Conegliano	3–0	Bartoccini-Mc Restauri Perugia	25–17	25–23	25–19			75–59	Report
1 Mar	20:30	Savino Del Bene Scandicci	1–3	Igor Gorgonzola Novara	20–25	25–16	22–25	15–25		82–91	Report
1 Mar	20:30	Megabox Ond. Savio Vallefoglia	3–1	Honda Olivero Cuneo	23–25	25–20	25–11	25–22		98–78	Report
1 Mar	20:30	Bergamo	2–3	Il Bisonte Firenze	25–23	25–21	28–30	18–25	13–15	109–114	Report
1 Mar	20:30	Reale Mutua Fenera Chieri '76	1–3	Numia Vero Volley Milano	18–25	26–24	20–25	17–25		81–99	Report
1 Mar	20:30	Eurotek Uyba Busto Arsizio	3–2	Cda Volley Talmassons Fvg	25–13	25–27	20–25	25–18	15–11	110–94	Report

== Championship playoffs ==
- All times are local, CET (UTC+01:00) between 8 March and 29 March 2025 and CEST (UTC+02:00) from 30 March 2025.
- The losers of the quarterfinals are moved to the second round of the Challenge playoffs.

=== Bracket ===
Quarterfinals
1	Prosecco Doc Imoco Conegliano	3	3
8	Bergamo	0	0
4	Igor Gorgonzola Novara	3	0	3
5	Reale Mutua Fenera Chieri '76	0	3	2
2	Numia Vero Volley Milano	3	3
7	Megabox Ond. Savio Vallefoglia	0	2
3	Savino Del Bene Scandicci	3	3
6	Eurotek Uyba Busto Arsizio	1	2

Semifinals
1	Prosecco Doc Imoco Conegliano	3	0	3	3
4	Igor Gorgonzola Novara	0	3	1	1
2	Numia Vero Volley Milano	3	3	3
3	Savino Del Bene Scandicci	0	2	1

Finals
1	Prosecco Doc Imoco Conegliano	3	3	3
2	Numia Vero Volley Milano	1	0	0

=== Quarterfinals ===
==== (1) Prosecco Doc Imoco Conegliano vs. (8) Bergamo ====
Date	Time		Score		Set 1	Set 2	Set 3	Set 4	Set 5	Total	Report
9 Mar	16:00	Prosecco Doc Imoco Conegliano	3–0	Bergamo	25–18	25–11	25–16			75–45	Report
16 Mar	17:00	Bergamo	0–3	Prosecco Doc Imoco Conegliano	13–25	21–25	19–25			53–75	Report

Prosecco Doc Imoco Conegliano wins series, 2–0.

==== (2) Numia Vero Volley Milano vs. (7) Megabox Ond. Savio Vallefoglia ====
Date	Time		Score		Set 1	Set 2	Set 3	Set 4	Set 5	Total	Report
9 Mar	19:00	Numia Vero Volley Milano	3–0	Megabox Ond. Savio Vallefoglia	25–22	25–16	25–16			75–54	Report
16 Mar	16:00	Megabox Ond. Savio Vallefoglia	2–3	Numia Vero Volley Milano	16–25	25–20	25–18	16–25	12–15	94–103	Report

Numia Vero Volley Milano wins series, 2–0.

==== (3) Savino Del Bene Scandicci vs. (6) Eurotek Uyba Busto Arsizio ====
Date	Time		Score		Set 1	Set 2	Set 3	Set 4	Set 5	Total	Report
9 Mar	17:00	Savino Del Bene Scandicci	3–1	Eurotek Uyba Busto Arsizio	25–14	23–25	25–14	25–17		98–70	Report
16 Mar	15:30	Eurotek Uyba Busto Arsizio	2–3	Savino Del Bene Scandicci	25–19	25–22	23–25	20–25	20–22	113–113	Report

Savino Del Bene Scandicci wins series, 2–0.

==== (4) Igor Gorgonzola Novara vs. (5) Reale Mutua Fenera Chieri '76 ====
Date	Time		Score		Set 1	Set 2	Set 3	Set 4	Set 5	Total	Report
8 Mar	18:00	Igor Gorgonzola Novara	3–0	Reale Mutua Fenera Chieri '76	25–15	25–20	25–18			75–53	Report
16 Mar	18:00	Reale Mutua Fenera Chieri '76	3–0	Igor Gorgonzola Novara	28–26	25–20	25–23			78–69	Report
19 Mar	20:30	Igor Gorgonzola Novara	3–2	Reale Mutua Fenera Chieri '76	20–25	25–12	20–25	25–17	15–6	105–85	Report

Igor Gorgonzola Novara wins series, 2–1.

=== Semifinals ===
==== (1) Prosecco Doc Imoco Conegliano vs. (4) Igor Gorgonzola Novara ====
Date	Time		Score		Set 1	Set 2	Set 3	Set 4	Set 5	Total	Report
22 Mar	18:00	Prosecco Doc Imoco Conegliano	3–0	Igor Gorgonzola Novara	25–17	25–16	25–13			75–46	Report
29 Mar	17:00	Igor Gorgonzola Novara	3–0	Prosecco Doc Imoco Conegliano	25–19	25–20	25–23			75–62	Report
6 Apr	15:20	Prosecco Doc Imoco Conegliano	3–1	Igor Gorgonzola Novara	16–25	25–18	25–11	25–15		91–69	Report
9 Apr	20:30	Igor Gorgonzola Novara	1–3	Prosecco Doc Imoco Conegliano	26–28	25–23	20–25	16–25		87–101	Report

Prosecco Doc Imoco Conegliano wins series, 3–1.

==== (2) Numia Vero Volley Milano vs. (3) Savino Del Bene Scandicci ====
Date	Time		Score		Set 1	Set 2	Set 3	Set 4	Set 5	Total	Report
23 Mar	18:00	Numia Vero Volley Milano	3–0	Savino Del Bene Scandicci	25–19	25–22	25–21			75–62	Report
30 Mar	20:30	Savino Del Bene Scandicci	2–3	Numia Vero Volley Milano	23–25	23–25	25–23	25–20	13–15	109–108	Report
6 Apr	17:00	Numia Vero Volley Milano	3–1	Savino Del Bene Scandicci	16–25	25–22	25–22	25–17		91–86	Report

Numia Vero Volley Milano wins series, 3–0.

=== Finals ===
==== (1) Prosecco Doc Imoco Conegliano vs. (2) Numia Vero Volley Milano ====
Date	Time		Score		Set 1	Set 2	Set 3	Set 4	Set 5	Total	Report
16 Apr	20:30	Prosecco Doc Imoco Conegliano	3–1	Numia Vero Volley Milano	25–17	24–26	25–21	25–13		99–77	Report
19 Apr	16:05	Numia Vero Volley Milano	0–3	Prosecco Doc Imoco Conegliano	22–25	20–25	18–25			60–75	Report
22 Apr	20:30	Prosecco Doc Imoco Conegliano	3–0	Numia Vero Volley Milano	25–22	25–20	25–21			75–63	Report

Prosecco Doc Imoco Conegliano wins series, 3–0.

== Challenge playoffs ==
- All times are local, CET (UTC+01:00) between 8 March and 29 March 2025 and CEST (UTC+02:00) from 30 March 2025.

=== First round ===
==== (9) Wash4Green Pinerolo vs. (12) Il Bisonte Firenze ====
Il Bisonte Firenze withdrew from the challenge playoffs and Wash4Green Pinerolo advanced directly to the second round.

==== (10) Bartoccini-Mc Restauri Perugia vs. (11) Honda Olivero Cuneo ====
Date	Time		Score		Set 1	Set 2	Set 3	Set 4	Set 5	Total	Report
8 Mar	18:00	Honda Olivero Cuneo	0–3	Bartoccini-Mc Restauri Perugia	20–25	21–25	15–25			56–75	Report
16 Mar	17:00	Bartoccini-Mc Restauri Perugia	3–0	Honda Olivero Cuneo	25–18	25–17	27–25			77–60	Report

Bartoccini-Mc Restauri Perugia wins series, 2–0.

=== Second round ===
==== (5) Reale Mutua Fenera Chieri '76 vs. (10) Bartoccini-Mc Restauri Perugia ====
Date	Time		Score		Set 1	Set 2	Set 3	Set 4	Set 5	Total	Report
22 Mar	20:30	Bartoccini-Mc Restauri Perugia	0–3	Reale Mutua Fenera Chieri '76	21–25	16–25	16–25			53–75	Report
30 Mar	18:00	Reale Mutua Fenera Chieri '76	3–2	Bartoccini-Mc Restauri Perugia	25–19	16–25	17–25	25–22	15–11	98–102	Report

Reale Mutua Fenera Chieri '76 wins series, 2–0.

==== (6) Eurotek Uyba Busto Arsizio vs. (9) Wash4Green Pinerolo ====
Date	Time		Score		Set 1	Set 2	Set 3	Set 4	Set 5	Total	Report
23 Mar	17:00	Wash4Green Pinerolo	3–2	Eurotek Uyba Busto Arsizio	21–25	25–17	19–25	25–19	15–7	105–93	Report
30 Mar	17:00	Eurotek Uyba Busto Arsizio	2–3	Wash4Green Pinerolo	22–25	25–19	19–25	25–18	14–16	105–103	Report

Wash4Green Pinerolo wins series, 2–0.

==== (7) Megabox Ond. Savio Vallefoglia vs. (8) Bergamo ====
Date	Time		Score		Set 1	Set 2	Set 3	Set 4	Set 5	Total	Report
23 Mar	19:00	Bergamo	0–3	Megabox Ond. Savio Vallefoglia	20–25	15–25	21–25			56–75	Report
30 Mar	17:00	Megabox Ond. Savio Vallefoglia	3–2	Bergamo	23–25	25–20	25–23	21–25	15–9	109–102	Report

Megabox Ond. Savio Vallefoglia wins series, 2–0.

=== Challenge semifinal ===
==== (7) Megabox Ond. Savio Vallefoglia vs. (9) Wash4Green Pinerolo ====
Date	Time		Score		Set 1	Set 2	Set 3	Set 4	Set 5	Total	Report
2 Apr	20:30	Megabox Ond. Savio Vallefoglia	3–0	Wash4Green Pinerolo	25–22	25–14	25–12			75–48	Report

=== Challenge final ===
==== (5) Reale Mutua Fenera Chieri '76 vs. (7) Megabox Ond. Savio Vallefoglia ====
Date	Time		Score		Set 1	Set 2	Set 3	Set 4	Set 5	Total	Report
5 Apr	20:00	Reale Mutua Fenera Chieri '76	2–3	Megabox Ond. Savio Vallefoglia	25–15	21–25	20–25	25–16	12–15	103–96	Report

== Final standings ==
1st place, gold medalist(s)	Prosecco Doc Imoco Conegliano
2nd place, silver medalist(s)	Numia Vero Volley Milano
	Savino Del Bene Scandicci
	Igor Gorgonzola Novara (Note: In June 2025, CEV announced that Igor Gorgonzola Novara had received a wild card to the 2025–26 CEV Champions League. Reale Mutua Fenera Chieri '76 replaced Igor Gorgonzola Novara as the Italian team in the 2025–26 CEV Cup.)
	Megabox Ond. Savio Vallefoglia

Qualified for 2025–26 CEV Champions League
Qualified for 2025–26 CEV Cup
Qualified for 2025–26 CEV Challenge Cup

2024–25 Italian champions
Prosecco Doc Imoco Conegliano
8th title

Gabriela Guimarães, Zhu Ting, Nanami Seki, Katja Eckl, Marina Lubian, Monica De Gennaro, Isabelle Haak, Joanna Wołosz (C), Merit Adigwe, Khalia Lanier, Martyna Łukasik, Cristina Chirichella, Sarah Fahr, Anna Bardaro
Head coach
Daniele Santarelli
