= 2019–20 Italian Women's Volleyball League =

2019–20 Italian Women's Serie A1
- League: Italian Women's Volleyball League
- Sport: Volleyball
- Duration: 12 October 2019 – 7 March 2020
- Teams: 14

Regular Season
- Season champions: Imoco Volley Conegliano (Note: Imoco Volley Conegliano was proclaimed winner of the regular season on 6 April 2020.)
- Top scorer: Camilla Mingardi (Note: Camilla Mingardi was the top scorer with 400 points when 19 out of 26 rounds were completed.)

Finals
- Champions: –
- Runners-up: –
- Finals MVP: –

Italian Women's Volleyball League seasons
- ← 2018–19 2020–21 →

The 2019–20 Serie A1 was the 75th season of the highest professional Italian Women's Volleyball League. The season, in which fourteen teams contested, started in October 2019 but was cancelled in March 2020 due to the COVID-19 pandemic.

== Format ==
The regular season would have consisted of 26 rounds, where the fourteen participating teams would have played each other twice (once home and once away). At the completion of the regular season, the 12 best teams would have advanced to the championship playoffs and the teams finishing 13th and 14th would have been relegated to Serie A2. However, because the regular season was cancelled when only 19 out of 26 rounds were completed, the playoffs did not take place and no teams were relegated.

The standings criteria:

- highest number of result points (points awarded for results: 3 points for 3–0 or 3–1 wins, 2 points for 3–2 win, 1 point for 2–3 loss);
- highest number of matches won;
- highest set quotient (the number of total sets won divided by the number of total sets lost);
- highest points quotient (the number of total points scored divided by the number of total points conceded).

== Teams ==
Club	Venue	Capacity	City/Area	Club locations in Italy (2019–20 season).
Banca Valsabbina Millenium Brescia	PalaGeorge	4,300	Montichiari	Club locations in Italy (2019–20 season).
Bartoccini Fortinfissi Perugia	PalaBarton	4,000	Perugia	Club locations in Italy (2019–20 season).
Bosca S.Bernardo Cuneo	PalaCastagnaretta	4,700	Cuneo	Club locations in Italy (2019–20 season).
èpiù Pomì Casalmaggiore	PalaRadi	3,519	Cremona	Club locations in Italy (2019–20 season).
Golden Tulip Volalto 2.0 Caserta	PalaVignola	1,200	Caserta	Club locations in Italy (2019–20 season).
Igor Gorgonzola Novara	Pala Igor Gorgonzola	4,000	Novara	Club locations in Italy (2019–20 season).
Il Bisonte Firenze	Nelson Mandela Forum	7,500	Florence	Club locations in Italy (2019–20 season).
Imoco Volley Conegliano	PalaVerde	5,344	Villorba	Club locations in Italy (2019–20 season).
Lardini Filottrano	PalaTriccoli	3,500	Jesi	Club locations in Italy (2019–20 season).
Reale Mutua Fenera Chieri	PalaFenera	1,506	Chieri	Club locations in Italy (2019–20 season).
Saugella Monza	Opiquad Arena	4,500	Monza	Club locations in Italy (2019–20 season).
Savino Del Bene Scandicci	Palazzetto dello Sport	2,000	Scandicci	Club locations in Italy (2019–20 season).
Unet E-Work Busto Arsizio	E-Work Arena	4,490	Busto Arsizio	Club locations in Italy (2019–20 season).
Zanetti Bergamo	PalaIntred	2,600	Bergamo	Club locations in Italy (2019–20 season).

== Regular season ==
=== League table ===
Pos	Team	Pld	W	L	Pts	SW	SL	SR	SPW	SPL	SPR
1	Imoco Volley Conegliano	20	19	1	57	59	7	8.429	1600	1235	1.296
2	Unet E-Work Busto Arsizio	19	16	3	48	51	17	3.000	1622	1398	1.160
3	Igor Gorgonzola Novara	20	14	6	41	47	28	1.679	1760	1575	1.117
4	Savino Del Bene Scandicci	20	13	7	39	49	33	1.485	1841	1737	1.060
5	Saugella Monza	20	12	8	36	44	33	1.333	1744	1627	1.072
6	èpiù Pomì Casalmaggiore	20	11	9	34	41	36	1.139	1786	1694	1.054
7	Reale Mutua Fenera Chieri	19	8	11	27	32	40	0.800	1576	1591	0.991
8	Zanetti Bergamo	19	8	11	24	34	42	0.810	1663	1713	0.971
9	Il Bisonte Firenze	20	8	12	24	29	42	0.690	1557	1641	0.949
10	Bosca S.Bernardo Cuneo	19	8	11	23	32	42	0.762	1596	1661	0.961
11	Banca Valsabbina Millenium Brescia	20	8	12	21	30	44	0.682	1579	1715	0.921
12	Lardini Filottrano	19	6	13	17	22	46	0.478	1439	1574	0.914
13	Bartoccini Fortinfissi Perugia	19	4	15	12	27	51	0.529	1563	1761	0.888
14	Golden Tulip Volalto 2.0 Caserta (Note: Golden Tulip Volalto 2.0 Caserta was penalized by three points for violating art. 13 of the competition regulations.)	20	2	18	5	18	54	0.333	1338	1742	0.768

Source: Lega Volley Femminile

=== Results table ===
Home \ Away	BRE	PER	CUN	CAS	VAC	NOV	FIR	CON	FIL	CHI	MON	SCA	BUS	BER
Banca Valsabbina Millenium Brescia			3–0	1–3	3–1	0–3	3–1	0–3	1–3	3–2			0–3	
Bartoccini Fortinfissi Perugia	3–0			1–3			1–3	3–2	2–3	3–2	0–3	1–3	1–3	3–2
Bosca S.Bernardo Cuneo	2–3	3–1				1–3	3–0	0–3	3–1	1–3	3–1	3–2		
èpiù Pomì Casalmaggiore	3–1	3–1	3–0		3–1		3–0	0–3	3–2		2–3	2–3		3–2
Golden Tulip Volalto 2.0 Caserta	0–3	3–0	1–3			1–3	1–3	2–3		0–3	3–0		0–3	2–3
Igor Gorgonzola Novara	2–3	3–1	3–1	3–0	3–0			1–3	3–0	1–3	1–3	3–1	3–1	
Il Bisonte Firenze	0–3	3–0	3–1		3–0	2–3		0–3		1–3		1–3	3–2	3–1
Imoco Volley Conegliano	3–0			3–0	3–0	3–0			3–1	3–0	3–0	3–0	3–0	3–0
Lardini Filottrano		3–2		0–3	3–1	0–3	3–0	0–3		3–1	0–3	0–3		0–3
Reale Mutua Fenera Chieri		3–1	3–1	0–3	3–1		0–3				0–3	2–3	0–3	3–1
Saugella Monza	3–1		2–3	3–2	3–0		3–0	0–3	3–0			2–3	1–3	3–1
Savino Del Bene Scandicci	3–0		1–3	3–1	3–0	2–3	3–0			3–1	2–3		2–3	3–0
Unet E-Work Busto Arsizio	3–1	3–1	3–0	3–0	3–1	3–0	3–0		3–0	3–0				
Zanetti Bergamo	3–1	3–2	3–1	3–1		0–3		0–3	3–0		3–2	2–3	1–3	

Source: Lega Volley Femminile
Legend: Blue = left column team win; Yellow = draw; Red = top row team win.

=== Fixtures and results ===
- All times are local, CEST (UTC+02:00) between 12 October and 26 October 2019 and CET (UTC+01:00) from 27 October 2019.

Round 1

Date	Time		Score		Set 1	Set 2	Set 3	Set 4	Set 5	Total	Report
12 Oct	20:30	Imoco Volley Conegliano	3–0	Saugella Monza	25–19	25–23	25–20			75–62	Report
13 Oct	17:00	èpiù Pomì Casalmaggiore	2–3	Savino Del Bene Scandicci	24–26	25–22	25–21	30–32	12–15	116–116	Report
13 Oct	17:00	Il Bisonte Firenze	3–2	Unet E-Work Busto Arsizio	25–21	18–25	20–25	25–15	15–11	103–97	Report
13 Oct	17:00	Zanetti Bergamo	3–0	Lardini Filottrano	25–23	25–22	27–25			77–70	Report
13 Oct	17:00	Banca Valsabbina Millenium Brescia	3–1	Golden Tulip Volalto 2.0 Caserta	25–21	26–28	26–24	25–17		102–90	Report
13 Oct	17:00	Bosca S.Bernardo Cuneo	1–3	Igor Gorgonzola Novara	25–23	23–25	17–25	22–25		87–98	Report
13 Oct	18:30	Reale Mutua Fenera Chieri	3–1	Bartoccini Fortinfissi Perugia	25–23	25–19	22–25	25–15		97–82	Report

Round 2

Date	Time		Score		Set 1	Set 2	Set 3	Set 4	Set 5	Total	Report
19 Oct	20:30	Savino Del Bene Scandicci	1–3	Bosca S.Bernardo Cuneo	15–25	22–25	25–13	22–25		84–88	Report
20 Oct	17:00	Igor Gorgonzola Novara	2–3	Banca Valsabbina Millenium Brescia	22–25	25–22	23–25	30–28	13–15	113–115	Report
20 Oct	17:00	Saugella Monza	3–1	Zanetti Bergamo	27–29	25–12	25–16	25–23		102–80	Report
20 Oct	17:00	Unet E-Work Busto Arsizio	3–0	Reale Mutua Fenera Chieri	25–15	25–19	25–19			75–53	Report
20 Oct	17:00	Lardini Filottrano	0–3	Imoco Volley Conegliano	11–25	23–25	23–25			57–75	Report
20 Oct	17:00	Bartoccini Fortinfissi Perugia	1–3	èpiù Pomì Casalmaggiore	22–25	25–22	21–25	17–25		85–97	Report
20 Oct	17:00	Golden Tulip Volalto 2.0 Caserta	1–3	Il Bisonte Firenze	25–18	25–27	21–25	22–25		93–95	Report

Round 3

Date	Time		Score		Set 1	Set 2	Set 3	Set 4	Set 5	Total	Report
26 Oct	20:30	Lardini Filottrano	0–3	Igor Gorgonzola Novara	24–26	18–25	19–25			61–76	Report
26 Oct	20:30	Il Bisonte Firenze	3–0	Bartoccini Fortinfissi Perugia	28–26	25–23	25–22			78–71	Report
27 Oct	17:00	Imoco Volley Conegliano	3–0	èpiù Pomì Casalmaggiore	25–21	25–16	25–18			75–55	Report
27 Oct	17:00	Unet E-Work Busto Arsizio	3–1	Banca Valsabbina Millenium Brescia	28–30	25–21	25–18	25–16		103–85	Report
27 Oct	17:00	Reale Mutua Fenera Chieri	3–1	Golden Tulip Volalto 2.0 Caserta	25–23	22–25	25–21	25–13		97–82	Report
27 Oct	17:00	Bosca S.Bernardo Cuneo	3–1	Saugella Monza	25–21	19–25	25–15	25–16		94–77	Report
27 Oct	18:00	Zanetti Bergamo	2–3	Savino Del Bene Scandicci	25–16	26–28	25–23	23–25	11–15	110–107	Report

Round 4

Date	Time		Score		Set 1	Set 2	Set 3	Set 4	Set 5	Total	Report
30 Oct	20:30	Igor Gorgonzola Novara	3–1	Unet E-Work Busto Arsizio	28–26	31–29	23–25	25–22		107–102	Report
31 Oct	20:30	Saugella Monza	2–3	Savino Del Bene Scandicci	25–21	25–23	20–25	14–25	12–15	96–109	Report
31 Oct	20:30	èpiù Pomì Casalmaggiore	3–2	Zanetti Bergamo	25–17	25–22	24–26	20–25	15–13	109–103	Report
31 Oct	20:30	Reale Mutua Fenera Chieri	0–3	Il Bisonte Firenze	21–25	23–25	22–25			66–75	Report
31 Oct	20:30	Banca Valsabbina Millenium Brescia	3–0	Bosca S.Bernardo Cuneo	25–18	27–25	25–23			77–66	Report
31 Oct	20:30	Bartoccini Fortinfissi Perugia	2–3	Lardini Filottrano	26–24	25–21	13–25	23–25	13–15	100–110	Report
31 Oct	20:30	Golden Tulip Volalto 2.0 Caserta	2–3	Imoco Volley Conegliano	22–25	25–21	18–25	25–21	13–15	103–107	Report

Round 5

Date	Time		Score		Set 1	Set 2	Set 3	Set 4	Set 5	Total	Report
2 Nov	20:30	Bosca S.Bernardo Cuneo	1–3	Reale Mutua Fenera Chieri	25–23	12–25	23–25	23–25		83–98	Report
3 Nov	16:00	Il Bisonte Firenze	0–3	Banca Valsabbina Millenium Brescia	23–25	22–25	20–25			65–75	Report
3 Nov	17:00	Savino Del Bene Scandicci	2–3	Igor Gorgonzola Novara	19–25	25–20	25–22	20–25	16–18	105–110	Report
3 Nov	17:00	Lardini Filottrano	0–3	èpiù Pomì Casalmaggiore	23–25	18–25	25–27			66–77	Report
3 Nov	17:00	Golden Tulip Volalto 2.0 Caserta	3–0	Saugella Monza	26–24	25–22	25–18			76–64	Report
4 Nov	20:30	Imoco Volley Conegliano	3–0	Zanetti Bergamo	25–21	29–27	25–16			79–64	Report
7 Nov	20:30	Bartoccini Fortinfissi Perugia	1–3	Unet E-Work Busto Arsizio	18–25	17–25	25–18	13–25		73–93	Report

Round 6

Date	Time		Score		Set 1	Set 2	Set 3	Set 4	Set 5	Total	Report
9 Nov	20:30	Igor Gorgonzola Novara	1–3	Imoco Volley Conegliano	21–25	25–23	23–25	18–25		87–98	Report
9 Nov	20:30	Saugella Monza	3–0	Lardini Filottrano	25–21	25–18	25–23			75–62	Report
9 Nov	20:30	Banca Valsabbina Millenium Brescia	1–3	èpiù Pomì Casalmaggiore	27–25	20–25	19–25	24–26		90–101	Report
10 Nov	17:00	Unet E-Work Busto Arsizio	3–1	Golden Tulip Volalto 2.0 Caserta	23–25	25–23	25–19	25–18		98–85	Report
10 Nov	17:00	Il Bisonte Firenze	3–1	Bosca S.Bernardo Cuneo	25–27	25–14	25–18	25–18		100–77	Report
10 Nov	17:00	Reale Mutua Fenera Chieri	2–3	Savino Del Bene Scandicci	25–15	19–25	23–25	25–20	9–15	101–100	Report
10 Nov	17:00	Zanetti Bergamo	3–2	Bartoccini Fortinfissi Perugia	19–25	22–25	25–18	25–22	15–10	106–100	Report

Round 7

Date	Time		Score		Set 1	Set 2	Set 3	Set 4	Set 5	Total	Report
12 Nov	20:30	Golden Tulip Volalto 2.0 Caserta	1–3	Igor Gorgonzola Novara	21–25	25–20	22–25	21–25		89–95	Report
12 Nov	20:30	Bosca S.Bernardo Cuneo	0–3	Imoco Volley Conegliano	23–25	14–25	20–25			57–75	Report
16 Nov	18:00	Bartoccini Fortinfissi Perugia	3–0	Banca Valsabbina Millenium Brescia	25–22	25–22	25–23			75–67	Report
17 Nov	17:00	Savino Del Bene Scandicci	3–0	Il Bisonte Firenze	25–18	25–17	25–20			75–55	Report
17 Nov	17:00	èpiù Pomì Casalmaggiore	2–3	Saugella Monza	26–28	25–20	22–25	27–25	10–15	110–113	Report
17 Nov	17:00	Zanetti Bergamo	1–3	Unet E-Work Busto Arsizio	25–21	22–25	23–25	18–25		88–96	Report
17 Nov	17:00	Lardini Filottrano	3–1	Reale Mutua Fenera Chieri	25–21	25–22	23–25	25–23		98–91	Report

Round 8

Date	Time		Score		Set 1	Set 2	Set 3	Set 4	Set 5	Total	Report
20 Nov	20:50	Reale Mutua Fenera Chieri	0–3	èpiù Pomì Casalmaggiore	21–25	20–25	15–25			56–75	Report
23 Nov	20:30	Unet E-Work Busto Arsizio	3–0	Bosca S.Bernardo Cuneo	25–19	25–12	25–18			75–49	Report
24 Nov	17:00	Imoco Volley Conegliano	3–0	Savino Del Bene Scandicci	25–23	25–10	25–15			75–48	Report
24 Nov	17:00	Igor Gorgonzola Novara	1–3	Saugella Monza	22–25	25–22	16–25	21–25		84–97	Report
24 Nov	17:00	Il Bisonte Firenze	3–1	Zanetti Bergamo	25–18	28–26	22–25	25–16		100–85	Report
24 Nov	17:00	Banca Valsabbina Millenium Brescia	1–3	Lardini Filottrano	25–23	21–25	16–25	22–25		84–98	Report
24 Nov	17:00	Golden Tulip Volalto 2.0 Caserta	3–0	Bartoccini Fortinfissi Perugia	25–16	25–21	25–20			75–57	Report

Round 9

Date	Time		Score		Set 1	Set 2	Set 3	Set 4	Set 5	Total	Report
1 Dec	17:00	Savino Del Bene Scandicci	2–3	Unet E-Work Busto Arsizio	25–20	20–25	25–20	19–25	12–15	101–105	Report
1 Dec	17:00	Saugella Monza	3–1	Banca Valsabbina Millenium Brescia	25–27	25–23	25–17	25–20		100–87	Report
1 Dec	17:00	èpiù Pomì Casalmaggiore	3–0	Il Bisonte Firenze	33–31	25–19	25–21			83–71	Report
1 Dec	17:00	Zanetti Bergamo	3–1	Bosca S.Bernardo Cuneo	25–20	19–25	25–23	25–21		94–89	Report
1 Dec	17:00	Lardini Filottrano	3–1	Golden Tulip Volalto 2.0 Caserta	25–22	25–15	24–26	25–22		99–85	Report
12 Dec	20:30	Igor Gorgonzola Novara	1–3	Reale Mutua Fenera Chieri	22–25	25–19	20–25	23–25		90–94	Report
12 Dec	20:30	Bartoccini Fortinfissi Perugia	3–2	Imoco Volley Conegliano	25–15	23–25	25–18	17–25	15–10	105–93	Report

Round 10

Date	Time		Score		Set 1	Set 2	Set 3	Set 4	Set 5	Total	Report
16 Oct	20:30	Banca Valsabbina Millenium Brescia	0–3	Imoco Volley Conegliano	17–25	15–25	14–25			46–75	Report
23 Oct	20:30	Il Bisonte Firenze	2–3	Igor Gorgonzola Novara	27–25	25–23	16–25	18–25	11–15	97–113	Report
8 Dec	17:00	Unet E-Work Busto Arsizio	3–0	èpiù Pomì Casalmaggiore	25–22	25–17	34–32			84–71	Report
8 Dec	17:00	Reale Mutua Fenera Chieri	0–3	Saugella Monza	21–25	24–26	23–25			68–76	Report
8 Dec	17:00	Bartoccini Fortinfissi Perugia	1–3	Savino Del Bene Scandicci	14–25	25–20	25–27	13–25		77–97	Report
8 Dec	17:00	Golden Tulip Volalto 2.0 Caserta	2–3	Zanetti Bergamo	17–25	22–25	35–33	26–24	11–15	111–122	Report
8 Dec	17:00	Bosca S.Bernardo Cuneo	3–1	Lardini Filottrano	23–25	25–22	26–24	25–17		99–88	Report

Round 11

Date	Time		Score		Set 1	Set 2	Set 3	Set 4	Set 5	Total	Report
14 Dec	20:30	èpiù Pomì Casalmaggiore	3–0	Bosca S.Bernardo Cuneo	25–23	25–13	25–16			75–52	Report
14 Dec	20:30	Zanetti Bergamo	3–1	Banca Valsabbina Millenium Brescia	21–25	25–23	25–17	25–13		96–78	Report
15 Dec	17:00	Imoco Volley Conegliano	3–0	Reale Mutua Fenera Chieri	25–19	25–16	25–16			75–51	Report
15 Dec	17:00	Igor Gorgonzola Novara	3–1	Bartoccini Fortinfissi Perugia	25–13	20–25	25–17	25–19		95–74	Report
15 Dec	17:00	Savino Del Bene Scandicci	3–0	Golden Tulip Volalto 2.0 Caserta	28–26	25–23	25–13			78–62	Report
15 Dec	17:00	Saugella Monza	1–3	Unet E-Work Busto Arsizio	24–26	18–25	28–26	22–25		92–102	Report
15 Dec	17:00	Lardini Filottrano	3–0	Il Bisonte Firenze	25–22	25–19	25–17			75–58	Report

Round 12

Date	Time		Score		Set 1	Set 2	Set 3	Set 4	Set 5	Total	Report
21 Dec	20:30	Igor Gorgonzola Novara	3–0	èpiù Pomì Casalmaggiore	25–22	25–22	25–19			75–63	Report
22 Dec	17:00	Savino Del Bene Scandicci	3–0	Banca Valsabbina Millenium Brescia	25–19	25–21	25–16			75–56	Report
22 Dec	17:00	Unet E-Work Busto Arsizio	3–0	Lardini Filottrano	27–25	25–23	25–20			77–68	Report
22 Dec	17:00	Il Bisonte Firenze	0–3	Imoco Volley Conegliano	21–25	16–25	23–25			60–75	Report
22 Dec	17:00	Reale Mutua Fenera Chieri	3–1	Zanetti Bergamo	25–23	18–25	25–15	25–20		93–83	Report
22 Dec	17:00	Bartoccini Fortinfissi Perugia	0–3	Saugella Monza	18–25	22–25	20–25			60–75	Report
22 Dec	17:00	Golden Tulip Volalto 2.0 Caserta	1–3	Bosca S.Bernardo Cuneo	17–25	25–23	25–27	18–25		85–100	Report

Round 13

Date	Time		Score		Set 1	Set 2	Set 3	Set 4	Set 5	Total	Report
26 Dec	17:00	Imoco Volley Conegliano	3–0	Unet E-Work Busto Arsizio	25–13	25–12	25–15			75–40	Report
26 Dec	17:00	Saugella Monza	3–0	Il Bisonte Firenze	25–17	25–21	25–21			75–59	Report
26 Dec	17:00	èpiù Pomì Casalmaggiore	3–1	Golden Tulip Volalto 2.0 Caserta	22–25	26–24	25–21	25–14		98–84	Report
26 Dec	17:00	Zanetti Bergamo	0–3	Igor Gorgonzola Novara	24–26	16–25	20–25			60–76	Report
26 Dec	17:00	Banca Valsabbina Millenium Brescia	3–2	Reale Mutua Fenera Chieri	12–25	25–18	24–26	25–23	15–9	101–101	Report
26 Dec	17:00	Lardini Filottrano	0–3	Savino Del Bene Scandicci	18–25	21–25	17–25			56–75	Report
26 Dec	17:00	Bosca S.Bernardo Cuneo	3–1	Bartoccini Fortinfissi Perugia	25–13	14–25	25–16	25–13		89–67	Report

Round 14

Date	Time		Score		Set 1	Set 2	Set 3	Set 4	Set 5	Total	Report
15 Jan	20:30	Saugella Monza	0–3	Imoco Volley Conegliano	22–25	19–25	22–25			63–75	Report
15 Jan	20:30	Savino Del Bene Scandicci	3–1	èpiù Pomì Casalmaggiore	31–29	25–22	25–27	25–23		106–101	Report
15 Jan	20:30	Unet E-Work Busto Arsizio	3–0	Il Bisonte Firenze	25–15	25–21	25–19			75–55	Report
15 Jan	20:30	Bartoccini Fortinfissi Perugia	3–2	Reale Mutua Fenera Chieri	20–25	25–22	25–17	17–25	15–12	102–101	Report
15 Jan	20:30	Lardini Filottrano	0–3	Zanetti Bergamo	13–25	18–25	15–25			46–75	Report
15 Jan	20:30	Golden Tulip Volalto 2.0 Caserta	0–3	Banca Valsabbina Millenium Brescia	22–25	8–25	19–25			49–75	Report
15 Jan	20:30	Igor Gorgonzola Novara	3–1	Bosca S.Bernardo Cuneo	22–25	25–18	26–24	25–23		98–90	Report

Round 15

Date	Time		Score		Set 1	Set 2	Set 3	Set 4	Set 5	Total	Report
18 Jan	20:30	Banca Valsabbina Millenium Brescia	0–3	Igor Gorgonzola Novara	19–25	22–25	21–25			62–75	Report
19 Jan	17:00	Bosca S.Bernardo Cuneo	3–2	Savino Del Bene Scandicci	25–17	15–25	20–25	28–26	15–13	103–106	Report
19 Jan	17:00	Zanetti Bergamo	3–2	Saugella Monza	25–23	23–25	19–25	25–23	15–11	107–107	Report
19 Jan	17:00	Reale Mutua Fenera Chieri	0–3	Unet E-Work Busto Arsizio	11–25	23–25	21–25			55–75	Report
19 Jan	17:00	Imoco Volley Conegliano	3–1	Lardini Filottrano	25–23	23–25	25–22	25–11		98–81	Report
19 Jan	17:00	èpiù Pomì Casalmaggiore	3–1	Bartoccini Fortinfissi Perugia	25–17	25–20	17–25	25–12		92–74	Report
19 Jan	17:00	Il Bisonte Firenze	3–0	Golden Tulip Volalto 2.0 Caserta	25–9	30–28	25–17			80–54	Report

Round 16

Date	Time		Score		Set 1	Set 2	Set 3	Set 4	Set 5	Total	Report
25 Jan	20:30	èpiù Pomì Casalmaggiore	0–3	Imoco Volley Conegliano	18–25	23–25	20–25			61–75	Report
26 Jan	17:00	Igor Gorgonzola Novara	3–0	Lardini Filottrano	25–21	25–17	25–13			75–51	Report
26 Jan	17:00	Banca Valsabbina Millenium Brescia	0–3	Unet E-Work Busto Arsizio	19–25	19–25	20–25			58–75	Report
26 Jan	17:00	Bartoccini Fortinfissi Perugia	1–3	Il Bisonte Firenze	25–19	19–25	23–25	17–25		84–94	Report
26 Jan	17:00	Golden Tulip Volalto 2.0 Caserta	0–3	Reale Mutua Fenera Chieri	16–25	17–25	10–25			43–75	Report
26 Jan	17:00	Savino Del Bene Scandicci	3–0	Zanetti Bergamo	25–16	25–23	25–13			75–52	Report
26 Jan	17:00	Saugella Monza	2–3	Bosca S.Bernardo Cuneo	26–28	22–25	25–19	25–21	11–15	109–108	Report

Round 17

Date	Time		Score		Set 1	Set 2	Set 3	Set 4	Set 5	Total	Report
8 Feb	20:30	Lardini Filottrano	3–2	Bartoccini Fortinfissi Perugia	22–25	18–25	25–19	25–13	15–12	105–94	Report
9 Feb	17:00	Unet E-Work Busto Arsizio	3–0	Igor Gorgonzola Novara	25–20	28–26	25–17			78–63	Report
9 Feb	17:00	Savino Del Bene Scandicci	2–3	Saugella Monza	25–15	21–25	27–25	23–25	9–15	105–105	Report
9 Feb	17:00	Zanetti Bergamo	3–1	èpiù Pomì Casalmaggiore	18–25	28–26	25–23	25–21		96–95	Report
9 Feb	17:00	Il Bisonte Firenze	1–3	Reale Mutua Fenera Chieri	22–25	23–25	25–21	20–25		90–96	Report
9 Feb	17:00	Bosca S.Bernardo Cuneo	2–3	Banca Valsabbina Millenium Brescia	25–15	25–23	24–26	18–25	10–15	102–104	Report
9 Feb	17:00	Imoco Volley Conegliano	3–0	Golden Tulip Volalto 2.0 Caserta	25–9	25–15	25–9			75–33	Report

Round 18

Date	Time		Score		Set 1	Set 2	Set 3	Set 4	Set 5	Total	Report
12 Feb	20:30	Zanetti Bergamo	0–3	Imoco Volley Conegliano	21–25	21–25	23–25			65–75	Report
12 Feb	20:30	Igor Gorgonzola Novara	3–1	Savino Del Bene Scandicci	25–20	25–16	26–28	25–13		101–77	Report
12 Feb	20:30	Banca Valsabbina Millenium Brescia	3–1	Il Bisonte Firenze	25–16	17–25	26–24	25–21		93–86	Report
12 Feb	20:30	èpiù Pomì Casalmaggiore	3–2	Lardini Filottrano	23–25	25–14	19–25	25–12	15–11	107–87	Report
12 Feb	20:30	Unet E-Work Busto Arsizio	3–1	Bartoccini Fortinfissi Perugia	25–18	25–18	22–25	25–17		97–78	Report
12 Feb	20:30	Saugella Monza	3–0	Golden Tulip Volalto 2.0 Caserta	25–0	25–0	25–0			75–0	Report
12 Feb	20:30	Reale Mutua Fenera Chieri	3–1	Bosca S.Bernardo Cuneo	22–25	25–21	25–23	25–19		97–88	Report

Round 19

Date	Time		Score		Set 1	Set 2	Set 3	Set 4	Set 5	Total	Report
16 Feb	15:30	Golden Tulip Volalto 2.0 Caserta	0–3	Unet E-Work Busto Arsizio	17–25	9–25	13–25			39–75	Report
16 Feb	17:00	Imoco Volley Conegliano	3–0	Igor Gorgonzola Novara	25–19	25–17	25–18			75–54	Report
16 Feb	17:00	Lardini Filottrano	0–3	Saugella Monza	17–25	20–25	24–26			61–76	Report
16 Feb	17:00	Bosca S.Bernardo Cuneo	3–0	Il Bisonte Firenze	25–16	25–18	25–20			75–54	Report
16 Feb	17:00	Savino Del Bene Scandicci	3–1	Reale Mutua Fenera Chieri	25–19	25–22	23–25	25–20		98–86	Report
16 Feb	17:00	Bartoccini Fortinfissi Perugia	3–2	Zanetti Bergamo	25–17	19–25	25–22	21–25	15–11	105–100	Report
16 Feb	17:00	èpiù Pomì Casalmaggiore	3–1	Banca Valsabbina Millenium Brescia	25–22	20–25	25–16	25–18		95–81	Report

Round 20

Date	Time		Score		Set 1	Set 2	Set 3	Set 4	Set 5	Total	Report
22 Feb	21:00	Saugella Monza	3–2	èpiù Pomì Casalmaggiore	20–25	26–24	25–20	19–25	15–11	105–105	Report
23 Feb	17:00	Il Bisonte Firenze	1–3	Savino Del Bene Scandicci	21–25	31–29	16–25	14–25		82–104	Report
6 Mar	20:30	Igor Gorgonzola Novara	3–0	Golden Tulip Volalto 2.0 Caserta	25–0	25–0	25–0			75–0	Report

Round 23

Date	Time		Score		Set 1	Set 2	Set 3	Set 4	Set 5	Total	Report
7 Mar	20:30	Imoco Volley Conegliano	3–0	Banca Valsabbina Millenium Brescia	25–12	25–17	25–14			75–43	Report

== Championship playoffs ==
Cancelled due to the COVID-19 pandemic.
