= Cortella =

Cortella is a surname. Notable people with the surname include:

- Antonio Cortella (1896–1962), Argentine footballer
- Mario Sergio Cortella (born 1954), Brazilian philosopher, writer, educator, and speaker
- Sara Cortella (born 2002), Italian volleyball player

== See also ==
- Corella (disambiguation)
