= Black Angels Perugia Volley =

Italian professional women's volleyball club in Perugia

- Full name: Black Angels Perugia Volley
- Ground: PalaBarton, Perugia, Italy (Capacity: 3,800)
- Chairman: Antonio Bartoccini
- Head coach: Stefano Micoli
- League: FIPAV Women's Serie A2
- Website: Club home page

Uniforms
Home	Away

Black Angels Perugia Volley, formerly Wealth Planet Perugia Volley, is an Italian professional women's volleyball club based in Perugia. The team currently plays in the Serie A2, Italy's second highest professional league.

== Previous names ==
Due to sponsorship, the club has competed under the following names:

- Gecom Security Corciano (2009–2012)
- Gecom Security Perugia (2012–2015)
- TUUM Perugia Volley (2015–2017)
- Bartoccini Gioiellerie Perugia (2017–2019)
- Bartoccini Fortinfissi Perugia (2019–2024)
- Bartoccini-MC Restauri Perugia (2024–2026)
- Bartoccini +energia Perugia (2026–)

== History ==
Wealth Planet was founded in 2005, but in its early days volleyball was not a part of the business. Instead Wealth Planet was focused on fitness, body building, healthy eating and well-being in general. However, in the late 2000s, Wealth Planet started supporting the local volleyball teams Colli del Tezio and Grifo Volley. In 2010, the company decided to join Serie C with its own volleyball team, Wealth Planet Village.

In August 2011, Wealth Planet Village was merged with the club Pallavolo Etruria Corciano to form Wealth Planet Etruria Village. After the merger, the club has one team in Serie B1, with the sponsored name Gecom Security Corciano, and one team in Serie C, with the sponsored name Multicopia Perugia. In 2012, the club changed its name from Wealth Planet Etruria Village to Wealth Planet Perugia and the sponsored name of the Serie B1 team was changed to Gecom Security Perugia.

In 2017, after playing in Serie B1 for seven years, Wealth Planet Perugia got the chance to play its first season in Serie A2 due to repechage. In its second season (2018–2019) in Serie A2, Wealth Planet Perugia finished the regular season in pool B in first place. The club also won the subsequent promotion pool and was promoted to Serie A1 for the 2019–2020 season.

In the 2022–2023 season of Serie A1, Wealth Planet Perugia finished the regular season in 13th place and was relegated back to Serie A2. The club was able to return to Serie A1 by winning the promotion pool in Serie A2 the following season (2023–2024). In June 2024, the club changed its name from Wealth Planet Perugia Volley to Black Angels Perugia Volley. In the 2025–2026 season of Serie A1, Perugia finished in last place and was relegated to Serie A2 again.

== Team ==
2026–2027 Team
Number	Player	Position	Height (m)	Birth date
2	(Italy) Sofia Biagianti	Opposite	1.88	1 December 2007 (age 18)
3	(Italy) Carolina Martinelli	Outside Hitter	1.78	19 June 2005 (age 21)
4	(Italy) Cecilia Nicolini	Setter	1.81	18 June 1994 (age 32)
5	(Italy) Francesca Michieletto	Outside Hitter	1.84	10 September 1997 (age 29)
7	(Italy) Claudia Consoli	Middle Blocker	1.83	4 February 2002 (age 24)
8	(Italy) Valentina Colombo	Middle Blocker	1.85	12 December 2003 (age 22)
10	(Italy) Stefania Recchia	Libero	1.62	14 July 2005 (age 21)
11	(Italy) Giulia Mancini	Middle Blocker	1.83	23 May 1998 (age 28)
14	(Italy) Alessia Fiesoli	Outside Hitter	1.85	25 May 1994 (age 32)
16	(Germany) Lena Große Scharmann	Opposite	1.87	24 April 1998 (age 28)
17	(Poland) Natasza Ornoch	Outside Hitter	1.89	25 December 2007 (age 18)
20	(Italy) Aurora Brambilla	Libero	1.70	20 May 2007 (age 19)
21	(Italy) Giovanna Fratangelo	Setter	1.78	26 January 2007 (age 19)

2025–2026 Team
Number	Player	Position	Height (m)	Birth date
1	(Hungary) Alíz Kump	Middle Blocker	1.85	11 November 2003 (age 22)
2	(Italy) Sofia Turlà	Setter	1.85	5 May 1997 (age 29)
3	(Italy) Elena Perinelli	Outside Hitter	1.81	27 June 1995 (age 31)
4	(Belgium) Nathalie Lemmens	Middle Blocker	1.95	12 March 1995 (age 31)
5	(Italy) Imma Sirressi (c)	Libero	1.75	19 May 1990 (age 36)
7	(Germany) Ivana Vanjak (Note: Ivana Vanjak joined the team on 17 December 2025.)	Outside Hitter	1.93	30 May 1995 (age 31)
8	(Italy) Maria Irene Ricci	Setter	1.81	17 February 1996 (age 30)
9	(Slovenia) Nika Markovič	Opposite	1.86	12 January 1999 (age 27)
10	(Italy) Stefania Recchia	Libero	1.62	14 July 2005 (age 21)
11	(Italy) Benedetta Bartolini	Middle Blocker	1.84	5 March 1999 (age 27)
12	(Italy) Alessia Mazzaro	Middle Blocker	1.85	19 September 1998 (age 28)
13	(Italy) Giulia Gennari (Note: Giulia Gennari joined the team on 30 December 2025.)	Setter	1.84	23 June 1996 (age 30)
14	(Italy) Alessia Fiesoli	Outside Hitter	1.85	25 May 1994 (age 32)
16	(Italy) Beatrice Gardini	Outside Hitter	1.84	1 April 2003 (age 23)
22	(United States) Kashauna Williams	Opposite	1.86	12 January 1999 (age 27)

2024–2025 Team
Number	Player	Position	Height (m)	Birth date
1	(Poland) Aleksandra Gryka	Middle Blocker	1.90	6 February 2000 (age 26)
2	(Italy) Gaia Traballi	Outside Hitter	1.83	5 February 1997 (age 29)
~~3~~	(Italy) ~~Giulia Orlandi~~ (Note: Giulia Orlandi left the team on 31 January 2025.)	~~Setter~~	~~1.86~~	~~29 January 2004 (age 22)~~
5	(Italy) Imma Sirressi (c)	Libero	1.75	19 May 1990 (age 36)
7	(Italy) Carolina Pecorari	Outside Hitter	1.84	7 January 2003 (age 23)
8	(Italy) Maria Irene Ricci	Setter	1.81	17 February 1996 (age 30)
10	(Italy) Stefania Recchia	Libero	1.62	14 July 2005 (age 21)
11	(Italy) Benedetta Bartolini	Middle Blocker	1.84	5 March 1999 (age 27)
12	(Peru) Yadhira Anchante (Note: Yadhira Anchante joined the team on 21 January 2025.)	Setter	1.80	19 November 2002 (age 23)
13	(Italy) Asia Cogliandro	Middle Blocker	1.84	12 January 1996 (age 30)
14	(Germany) Anastasia Cekulaev	Middle Blocker	1.91	1 July 2003 (age 23)
15	(Hungary) Anett Németh	Opposite	1.88	13 December 1999 (age 26)
16	(Italy) Beatrice Gardini	Outside Hitter	1.84	1 April 2003 (age 23)
18	(Italy) Rachele Rastelli	Opposite	1.92	22 June 1999 (age 27)
19	(Romania) Adelina Budăi-Ungureanu	Outside Hitter	1.87	29 July 2000 (age 26)

2023–2024 Team
Number	Player	Position	Height (m)	Birth date
1	(Italy) Glenda Messaggi	Opposite	1.82	21 January 1999 (age 27)
2	(Italy) Gaia Traballi	Outside Hitter	1.83	5 February 1997 (age 29)
4	(Italy) Princess Atamah	Middle Blocker	1.88	1 March 2005 (age 21)
5	(Italy) Imma Sirressi (c)	Libero	1.75	19 May 1990 (age 36)
6	(Italy) Alessia Lillacci	Libero	1.67	6 March 1997 (age 29)
7	(Italy) Giulia Viscioni	Outside Hitter	1.85	13 August 2004 (age 22)
8	(Italy) Maria Irene Ricci	Setter	1.81	17 February 1996 (age 30)
9	(Italy) Federica Braida	Setter	1.82	31 August 2000 (age 26)
11	(Italy) Benedetta Bartolini	Middle Blocker	1.84	5 March 1999 (age 27)
12	(Colombia) Ivonee Montaño	Opposite	1.88	12 November 1995 (age 30)
13	(Italy) Asia Cogliandro	Middle Blocker	1.84	12 January 1996 (age 30)
14	(Italy) Sara Turini	Outside Hitter	1.85	27 February 2007 (age 19)
18	(Italy) Dayana Kosareva	Outside Hitter	1.86	24 August 1999 (age 27)

2022–2023 Team
Number	Player	Position	Height (m)	Birth date
2	(Italy) Claudia Provaroni	Libero	1.81	14 May 1998 (age 28)
4	(Italy) Giorgia Avenia	Setter	1.80	4 April 1994 (age 32)
5	(Netherlands) Tessa Polder	Middle Blocker	1.89	19 May 1997 (age 29)
6	(Italy) Beatrice Gardini	Outside Hitter	1.84	1 April 2003 (age 23)
~~7~~	(United States) ~~Stephanie Samedy~~ (Note: Stephanie Samedy left the team on 13 January 2023.)	~~Opposite~~	~~1.88~~	~~27 September 1998 (age 28)~~
7	(Poland) Monika Gałkowska (Note: Monika Gałkowska joined the team in January 2023.)	Opposite	1.88	6 April 1996 (age 30)
8	(Italy) Chiara Rumori	Libero	1.63	16 June 1998 (age 28)
9	(Puerto Rico) Raymariely Santos (Note: Raymariely Santos joined the team in January 2023.)	Setter	1.83	13 April 1992 (age 34)
10	(Italy) Martina Armini	Libero	1.75	19 September 2002 (age 24)
11	(Italy) Benedetta Bartolini	Middle Blocker	1.84	5 March 1999 (age 27)
12	(Italy) Anastasia Guerra (c)	Outside Hitter	1.86	15 October 1996 (age 29)
13	(Austria) Anamarija Galic	Opposite	2.00	7 January 2001 (age 25)
14	(France) Clémence Garcia (Note: Clémence Garcia joined the team in February 2023.)	Middle Blocker	1.86	20 October 1997 (age 28)
~~16~~	(United States) ~~Victoria Dilfer~~ (Note: Victoria Dilfer left the team on 30 December 2022.)	~~Setter~~	~~1.80~~	~~26 February 1999 (age 27)~~
17	(Italy) Linda Nwakalor	Middle Blocker	1.87	17 September 2002 (age 24)
18	(Sweden) Alexandra Lazić	Outside Hitter	1.88	24 September 1994 (age 32)

2021–2022 Team
Number	Player	Position	Height (m)	Birth date
2	(Italy) Claudia Provaroni	Libero	1.81	14 May 1998 (age 28)
3/13	(Italy) Giulia Melli	Outside Hitter	1.85	8 January 1998 (age 28)
4	(Netherlands) Britt Bongaerts	Setter	1.85	3 October 1996 (age 29)
5	(Italy) Imma Sirressi	Libero	1.75	19 May 1990 (age 36)
6	(Italy) Gaia Guiducci	Setter	1.78	9 March 2002 (age 24)
7	(Poland) Monika Gałkowska (Note: Monika Gałkowska joined the team in February 2022.)	Opposite	1.88	6 April 1996 (age 30)
8	(Italy) Chiara Rumori	Libero	1.63	16 June 1998 (age 28)
9	(Italy) Laura Melandri	Middle Blocker	1.86	31 January 1995 (age 31)
12	(Italy) Anastasia Guerra	Outside Hitter	1.86	15 October 1996 (age 29)
~~13~~	(Italy) ~~Valentina Diouf~~ (Note: Valentina Diouf left the team on 26 January 2022.)	~~Opposite~~	~~2.02~~	~~10 January 1993 (age 33)~~
15	(Italy) Anastasia Scarabottini	Outside Hitter	1.85	12 October 2004 (age 21)
16	(Czech Republic) Helena Havelková (c)	Outside Hitter	1.88	25 July 1988 (age 38)
17	(Italy) Linda Nwakalor	Middle Blocker	1.87	17 September 2002 (age 24)
18	(Italy) Binto Diop	Opposite	1.94	2 March 2002 (age 24)
28	(France) Christina Bauer	Middle Blocker	1.96	1 January 1988 (age 38)

== Head coaches ==
Period	Head coach
–2020	(Italy) Fabio Bovari
2020–2021	(Italy) Davide Mazzanti
2021–2022	(Italy) Luca Cristofani
2022–2023	(Italy) Matteo Bertini
2023–2026	(Italy) Andrea Giovi
2026–	(Italy) Stefano Micoli
