= Pallavolo Cisterna 88 =

Omia Cisterna
- Full name: Pallavolo Cisterna 88
- Founded: 1988
- Ground: PalaRamadù, Cisterna, Italy (Capacity: 600)
- Chairman: Alessandro Droghei
- Head coach: Daniela Nuovo
- League: FIPAV Women's Serie C
- 2016–17: 14th in Serie A2 (Relegated to Serie B1)
- Website: Club home page

Uniforms
Home	Away

Pallavolo Cisterna 88 is an Italian women's volleyball club based in Cisterna di Latina and currently playing in the Serie C.

== Previous names ==
Due to sponsorship, the club have competed under the following names:

- Pallavolo Cisterna 88 (1988–2013)
- Omia Volley 88 (2013–2015)
- Omia Cisterna (2015–present)

== History ==
The club was established in 1988 as the volleyball department of Polisportiva Cisterna 88. The club has many teams (girls, youth, junior and senior) playing at different competitions. The senior team has participated in the Series C, B2, B1 and in 2015 was promoted to Serie A2. At the conclusion of the 2016–17 season, following its relegation from Serie A2 to Serie B1, the club decided to reorganize and focus on its youth team competing at Serie C.

== Venue ==
The club play its home matches at the Palasport Del Campus Dei Licei Ramadù (also known as PalaRamadù) in Cisterna di Latina. The venue has approximately 600 spectators capacity.

During a brief period in 2015 (between October and December) the club moved from PalaRamadù to Palazzetto dello Sport "Tiziano Ciotti" in Anagni.

== Team ==
This was the last Serie A2 club squad, Season 2016–2017, as of March 2017.

Number	Player	Position	Height (m)	Weight (kg)	Birth date
1	(Italy) Barbara Bacciottini	Setter	1.81		28 July 1994 (age 31)
2	(Italy) Carlotta Fusari	Setter	1.81		26 January 1999 (age 26)
3	(Italy) Francesca Borrelli	Middle blocker	1.85		15 March 1995 (age 30)
5	(Italy) Arianna Barboni	Outside hitter	1.86		13 November 1996 (age 28)
6	(Italy) Angelica Noschese	Libero	1.67		22 May 1998 (age 27)
7	(Italy) Giulia Modena	Outside hitter	1.77		7 March 1995 (age 30)
8	(Italy) Laura Mariani	Outside hitter	1.81		19 October 1999 (age 25)
9	(Italy) Claudia Marinelli	Libero	1.69		8 September 1989 (age 36)
10	(Serbia) Ivana Bulajić	Middle blocker	1.88		18 July 1991 (age 34)
11	(Brazil) Jessica Ventura Ferreira	Outside hitter	1.85		6 October 1991 (age 33)
14	(Italy) Fabiana Antignano	Middle blocker	1.86		30 June 1995 (age 30)
15	(Italy) Ilaria Maruotti	Outside hitter	1.83		22 February 1994 (age 31)
