= Club Italia =

Italian volleyball club

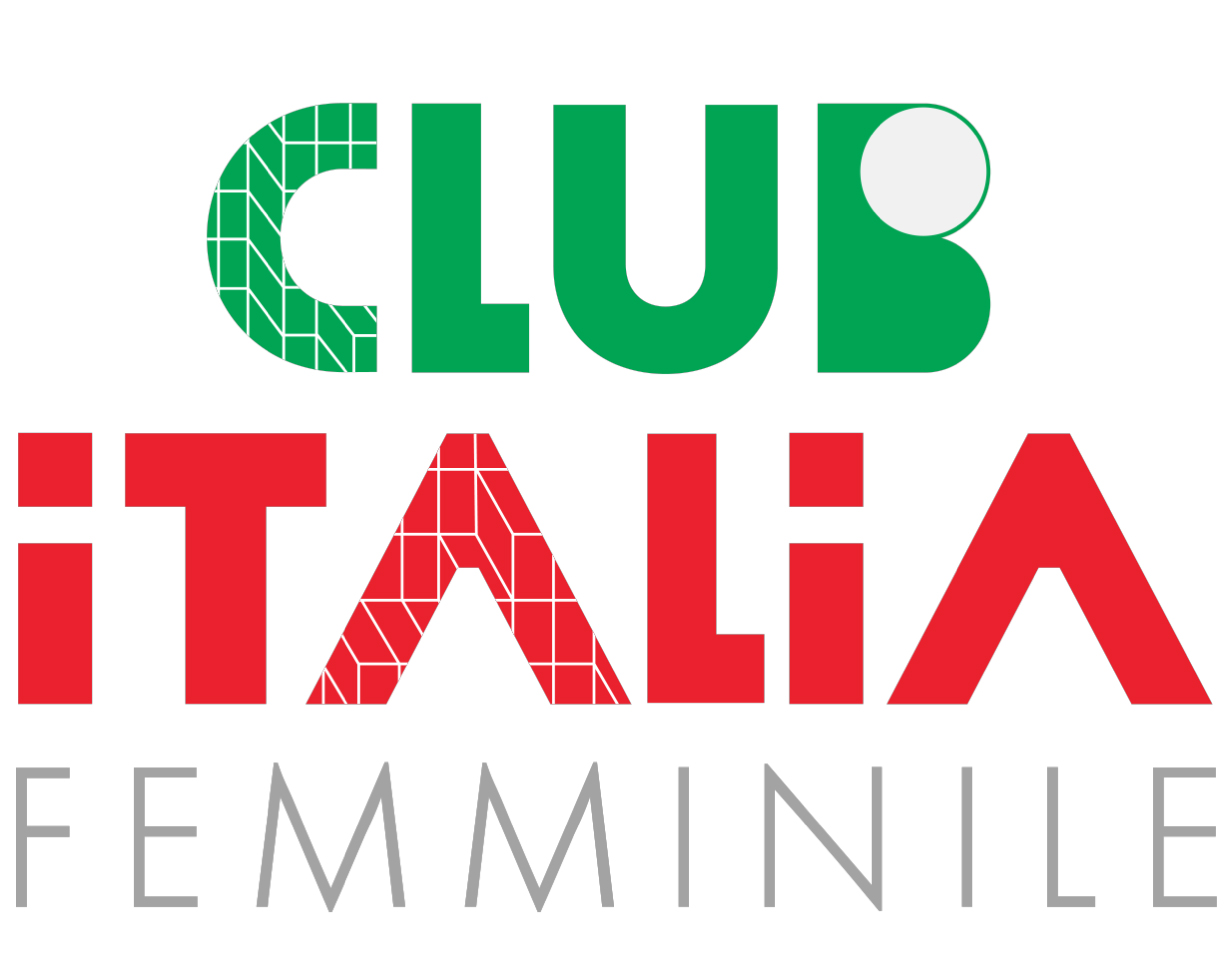
- Full name: Club Italia
- Founded: 1998
- Chairman: FIPAV
- League: FIPAV Women's Serie A2

Uniforms
Home	Away

Club Italia is an Italian women's volleyball club based in Rome which currently plays in the Serie A2.

== History ==
The team was founded in 1998 by then Italian federation sports director Julio Velasco, in order to develop the skills of younger players in a competitive league rather than in youth leagues. The team is directly controlled by the Italian Volleyball Federation, which is entitled to put the best younger scouted players in the team. After a lot of seasons in the lower leagues of Serie B1 and Serie B2, Club Italia was automatically promoted by the Italian Federation into Serie A2 (2nd tier) in 2014 and then into Serie A1 (first tier) in 2015, avoiding relegation in its first season. Over the next two seasons, Anna Danesi, Paola Egonu, Ofelia Malinov and Alessia Orro have been called up to the Italian national team while playing for Club Italia. At the conclusion of the 2016–17 season, the club was relegated to Serie A2. The club returned to the Serie A1 in the 2018–19 season.

The club has competed under various names:

- Club Italia (1998–2016)
- Club Italia Crai (2016–2022)
- Club Italia (2022–present)

== Squad ==
Season 2017–2018, as of September 2017.

Number	Player	Position	Height (m)	Birth date
1	(Italy) Terry Enweonwu	Outside hitter	1.87	12 May 2000 (age 26)
2	(Italy) Tatjana Fucka	Middle blocker	1.87	18 May 1999 (age 27)
3	(Italy) Adhuoljok John Majak Malual	Middle blocker	1.90	14 November 2000 (age 25)
4	(Italy) Rachele Morello	Setter	1.82	7 November 2000 (age 25)
5	(Italy) Marina Lubian	Middle blocker	1.92	11 April 2000 (age 26)
6	(Italy) Sara Cortella	Outside hitter	1.85	15 February 2002 (age 24)
7	(Italy) Elena Pietrini	Outside hitter	1.86	17 March 2000 (age 26)
9	(Italy) Loveth Omoruyi	Outside hitter	1.82	25 August 2002 (age 23)
10	(Italy) Chiara De Bortoli	Libero	1.76	28 July 1997 (age 29)
11	(Italy) Elisa Tonello	Outside hitter	1.76	22 April 2000 (age 26)
12	(Italy) Alice Turco	Setter	1.78	4 February 2000 (age 26)
13	(Italy) Sarah Fahr	Middle blocker	1.92	12 September 2001 (age 24)
15	(Italy) Sylvia Nwakalor	Outside hitter	1.77	12 August 1999 (age 26)
16	(Italy) Linda Mangani	Outside hitter	1.84	16 February 2000 (age 26)
17	(Italy) Katarina Bulović	Outside hitter	1.84	15 February 2002 (age 24)

2016–2017 Team
Number	Player	Position	Height (m)	Birth date
1	(Italy) Terry Enweonwu	Outside hitter	1.87	12 May 2000 (age 26)
3	(Italy) Elena Perinelli	Opposite	1.81	27 June 1995 (age 31)
4	(Italy) Rachele Morello	Setter	1.82	7 November 2000 (age 25)
5	(Italy) Marina Lubian	Middle blocker	1.92	11 April 2000 (age 26)
7	(Italy) Martina Ferrara	Libero	1.68	28 January 1999 (age 27)
8	(Italy) Alessia Orro	Setter	1.80	18 July 1998 (age 28)
9	(Italy) Vittoria Piani	Opposite	1.87	12 February 1998 (age 28)
10	(Italy) Chiara De Bortoli	Libero	1.76	28 July 1997 (age 29)
11	(Italy) Giulia Mancini	Middle blocker	1.83	23 May 1998 (age 28)
12	(Italy) Alessia Arciprete	Outside hitter	1.80	6 September 1997 (age 28)
13	(Italy) Giulia Melli	Outside hitter	1.84	8 January 1998 (age 28)
14	(Italy) Alexandra Botezat	Middle blocker	1.96	3 August 1998 (age 28)
15	(Italy) Sara Cortella	Outside hitter	1.85	15 February 2002 (age 24)
17	(Italy) Katarina Bulović	Outside hitter	1.84	15 February 2002 (age 24)
18	(Italy) Paola Egonu	Outside hitter	1.89	18 December 1998 (age 27)
