= Volley Talmassons =

Italian professional women's volleyball club in Talmassons

- Full name: Volley Talmassons
- Founded: 1991
- Ground: Palasport Latisana; Latisana, Italy (Capacity: 1,500)
- Chairman: Ambrogio Cattelan
- Head coach: Fabio Parazzoli
- League: FIPAV Women's Serie A1
- Website: Club home page

Uniforms
Home	Away

Volley Talmassons is an Italian professional women's volleyball club based in Talmassons, in the province of Udine. The team currently plays in the Serie A1, Italy's highest professional league.

== Previous names ==
Due to sponsorship, the club has competed under the following names:

- CDA Volley Talmassons (–2023)
- CDA Volley Talmassons FVG (2023–present)

== History ==
Volley Talmassons was founded in 1991, but it was not registered in the Italian volleyball federation (FIPAV) until 1993. The club started playing in the provincial second division, but advanced to the provincial first division in 2001. In 2003, Volley Talmassons was promoted to Serie D and the following season the club was promoted again, now to Serie C.

In 2012, Volley Talmassons finished second in the promotion pool of Serie C and the club moved up to Serie B2. After playing in Serie B2 for three seasons, Volley Talmassons won pool D in the 2014–2015 season of the division and advanced to Serie B1.

In 2019, Volley Talmassons reached Serie A2 by winning pool B in the 2018–2019 season of Serie B1. With that, Talmassons became the smallest municipality in Italy to have a team in Serie A2. Five years later, in 2024, Volley Talmassons won the play-off finals in Serie A2 and the club was promoted to the top league in Italy, Serie A1. In its debut season in Serie A1 (2024–2025), the club finished the regular season in last place and was relegated to Serie A2 again. Talmassons returned to Serie A1 in the 2026–2027 season after winning the promotion pool of the 2025–2026 Serie A2.

== Team ==
2026–2027 Team
Number	Player	Position	Height (m)	Birth date
1	(Italy) Karin Barbazeni	Middle Blocker	1.95	24 February 1999 (age 27)
6	(Italy) Alessandra Mistretta	Libero	1.65	5 February 2002 (age 24)
7	(Croatia) Leonarda Grabić	Outside Hitter	1.86	7 July 2003 (age 23)
8	(Austria) Dana Schmit	Setter	1.78	20 July 1997 (age 29)
10	(Italy) Islam Gannar	Middle Blocker	1.89	3 July 2004 (age 22)
11	(Italy) Aurora Rossetto	Outside Hitter	1.88	21 January 1997 (age 29)
12	(Italy) Beatrice Molinaro (c)	Middle Blocker	1.90	15 June 1995 (age 31)
13	(Greece) Effrosyni Bakodimou	Outside Hitter	1.81	25 January 2000 (age 26)
14	(Italy) Giorgia Frosini	Opposite	1.89	29 November 2002 (age 23)
17	(Switzerland) Julie Lengweiler	Outside Hitter	1.86	6 November 1998 (age 27)
19	(Italy) Amélie Vighetto	Opposite	1.93	13 March 2006 (age 20)
20	(Italy) Francesca Scola	Setter	1.83	15 September 2001 (age 24)
21	(Italy) Aurora Cassan	Libero	1.60	21 July 2006 (age 20)
25	(Cuba) Liset Herrera Blanco	Middle Blocker	1.92	6 December 1998 (age 27)

2025–2026 Team
Number	Player	Position	Height (m)	Birth date
1	(Italy) Karin Barbazeni	Middle Blocker	1.95	24 February 1999 (age 27)
2	(Italy) Sofia Cusma	Opposite	1.87	14 September 2004 (age 21)
3	(Italy) Rebecca Feruglio	Setter	1.78	24 February 2006 (age 20)
4	(Italy) Alice Viola	Outside Hitter	1.78	21 February 2006 (age 20)
6	(Italy) Alessandra Mistretta	Libero	1.65	5 February 2002 (age 24)
~~8~~	(United States) ~~Alyssa Enneking~~ (Note: Alyssa Enneking left the team on 14 January 2026.)	~~Outside Hitter~~	~~1.84~~	~~8 December 1997 (age 28)~~
9	(Italy) Silvia Lotti (Note: Silvia Lotti joined the team on 9 December 2025.)	Outside Hitter	1.85	17 June 1992 (age 34)
10	(Italy) Islam Gannar	Middle Blocker	1.89	3 July 2004 (age 22)
11	(Italy) Aurora Rossetto	Outside Hitter	1.88	21 January 1997 (age 29)
12	(Italy) Beatrice Molinaro (c)	Middle Blocker	1.90	15 June 1995 (age 31)
13	(Greece) Efrosyni Bakodímou	Outside Hitter	1.81	25 January 2000 (age 26)
14	(Italy) Giorgia Frosini	Opposite	1.89	29 November 2002 (age 23)
20	(Italy) Francesca Scola	Setter	1.83	15 September 2001 (age 24)
21	(Italy) Aurora Cassan	Libero	1.60	21 July 2006 (age 20)

2024–2025 Team
Number	Player	Position	Height (m)	Birth date
1	(Italy) Alice Pamio	Outside Hitter	1.81	15 January 1998 (age 28)
2	(Italy) Sofia Gazzola	Libero	1.57	8 August 2006 (age 20)
3	(Italy) Rebecca Feruglio	Setter	1.78	24 February 2006 (age 20)
6	(Serbia) Jovana Kocić	Middle Blocker	1.90	24 February 1998 (age 28)
7	(Italy) Martina Ferrara (c)	Libero	1.68	28 January 1999 (age 27)
8	(Italy) Nicole Piomboni	Outside Hitter	1.80	22 November 2005 (age 20)
9	(Italy) Islam Gannar	Middle Blocker	1.89	3 July 2004 (age 22)
10	(Italy) Chidera Blessing Eze	Setter	1.81	2 September 2003 (age 22)
~~11~~	(Russia) ~~Yana Shcherban~~ (Note: Yana Shcherban left the team on 13 January 2025.)	~~Outside Hitter~~	~~1.85~~	~~6 September 1989 (age 36)~~
12	(Greece) Olga Strantzali	Outside Hitter	1.85	12 January 1996 (age 30)
14	(Italy) Alexandra Botezat	Middle Blocker	1.96	3 August 1998 (age 28)
15	(Italy) Bianca Bucciarelli	Outside Hitter	1.85	2 June 2001 (age 25)
17	(Switzerland) Maja Storck (Note: Maja Storck joined the team on 26 November 2024.)	Opposite	1.83	8 October 1998 (age 27)
~~24~~	(Ukraine) ~~Anastasiia Kraiduba~~ (Note: Anastasiia Kraiduba left the team on 9 December 2024.)	~~Opposite~~	~~1.94~~	~~15 April 1995 (age 31)~~

2023–2024 Team
Number	Player	Position	Height (m)	Birth date
1	(Italy) Anita Bagnoli	Setter	1.75	21 August 2004 (age 22)
2	(United States) Leah Hardeman	Outside Hitter	1.78	18 October 1995 (age 30)
3	(Italy) Alessia Populini	Outside Hitter	1.79	10 September 2000 (age 25)
4	(Italy) Camilla Grazia	Middle Blocker	1.93	5 August 2000 (age 26)
5	(Italy) Isabella Monaco	Libero	1.73	24 September 2001 (age 24)
8	(Italy) Nicole Piomboni	Outside Hitter	1.80	22 November 2005 (age 20)
9	(Italy) Elisa Bole	Outside Hitter	1.83	6 October 2003 (age 22)
10	(Italy) Chidera Blessing Eze	Setter	1.81	2 September 2003 (age 22)
11	(Portugal) Júlia Kavalenka	Opposite	1.91	2 March 1999 (age 27)
12	(Italy) Rebecca Feruglio	Setter	1.78	24 February 2006 (age 20)
15	(Italy) Petra Gulich	Outside Hitter	1.87	9 June 2006 (age 20)
16	(Italy) Beatrice Negretti (c)	Libero	1.70	16 November 1999 (age 26)
17	(Italy) Katja Eckl	Middle Blocker	1.88	6 May 2003 (age 23)
18	(Italy) Veronica Costantini	Middle Blocker	1.91	23 March 2003 (age 23)

== Head coaches ==
Period	Head coach
2012–2018	(Italy) Stefano Castegnaro
2018–2020	(Italy) Ettore Guidetti
2020–2026	(Italy) Leonardo Barbieri
2026–	(Italy) Fabio Parazzoli
