= Olga Strantzali =

Greek volleyball player (born 1996)

Personal information
- Nationality: Greece
- Born: January 12, 1996 (age 30); Skydra, Macedonia, Greece
- Height: 1.85 m (6 ft 1 in)

Volleyball information
- Position: Outside hitter
- Current club: Panathinaikos
- Number: 6

Career
Years	Teams
2008–2009; 2009–2011; 2011–2012; 2012–2014; 2014–2015; 2015–2017; 2017–2018; 2018–2019; 2019–2020; 2020–2021; 2021; 2021–2022; 2022–2023; 2023–2024; 2024–2025; 2025–2026; 2026–	(Greece) Aristotelis Skydra (Greece) Iraklis (Greece) Aias Evosmou (Greece) Iraklis (United States) UCLA Bruins (United States) Miami Hurricanes (France) Béziers Volley (Poland) PTPS Piła (Poland) DPD Legionovia Legionowo (Italy) Cuneo Volley (Poland) KPS Chemik Police (Romania) CSM Volei Alba Blaj (Greece) PAOK (Greece) AEK Athens (Italy) Volley Talmassons (Japan) Saga Hisamitsu Springs (Greece) Panathinaikos

National team
Greece
- Last updated: 27 May 2023

Olga Strantzali (Greek: Όλγα Στράντζαλη; born January 12, 1996) is a female professional volleyball player from Greece, who is a member of the Greek national team. Currently she competes as an οutside hitter for Panathinaikos.

== Personal ==
She played college volleyball at University of Miami and was named the 2017 ACC Player of the Year. Mother is Euthimia Kritidou and father is Athanasios Strantzalis. She has one younger brother, Dimitris. Strantzali has relationship with Vassilis Kavvadas.
