= Sara Cortella =

Italian volleyball player

Personal information
- Nationality: Italian
- Born: 15 February 2002 (age 24); Rome, Italy

Volleyball information
- Position: Outside hitter / Opposite
- Current club: Polisportiva Libertas Martignacco

Career
Years	Teams
2016–2018	Club Italia
2018-2020	Imoco Volley
2020-	Libertas Martignacco

National team
2016-2017	U16 Italy
2017-2018	U17 Italy

Sara Cortella (born 15 February 2002) is an Italian volleyball player. She is currently playing for female team Libertas Martignacco, in Italian Women's 2 Volleyball League, and for the Italian U17 National women's volleyball team.

== Early career ==
Sara, elder daughter of Ivan Cortella and Luana Catrini, started playing volleyball in Tor Sapienza, Rome, when she was five. With her athletic club, Volley Friends Tor Sapienza, she won several youth competitions, including Under 12 Rome championship in 2013; Under 13 Rome championship, Lazio championship and the XI Torneig Internacional Ciutat de Sant Cugat in 2014; Under 14 Easter Volley in 2015.

== Club Italia ==
In 2016-2017 season, Sara Cortella played for Club Italia, wearing jersey number 15, playing in three games for a total of 4 sets and scoring one point with an ace on her debut in Italian Women's Volleyball League, which took place on her fifteenth birthday in Scandicci (FI), against Pallavolo Scandicci

In 2017–2018, Sara Cortella played one more year for Club Italia, relegated to Serie A2 at the end of previous season.

== Italian U16 National women's volleyball team ==
Sara Cortella joined the Italian U16 National women's volleyball team to play the first edition of the European U16 women's volleyball championship. In Sofia, Bulgaria, on 29 July, she played the final against Russia and won the gold medal (3-0, 25/22, 25/22, 25/17).

== Italian U17 National women's volleyball team ==
Sara Cortella joined the Italian U17 National women's volleyball team to fly again to Bulgaria and play the thirteenth edition of the Girls' Youth European Volleyball Championship, the first with Under 17 teams involved. In Sofia, on 21 April, she played a dramatic final at the Hristo Botev Hall, which her team lost against Russia (1-3, 28/30, 24/26, 25/20, 24-26).

== Palmarès ==
U16 National team

European championship 2017

U17 National team

European championship 2018
