= Roma Volley Club (women's volleyball) =

Italian volleyball club

- Full name: Roma Volley Club
- Founded: 2013
- Ground: Palazzetto dello Sport; Rome, Italy (Capacity: 3,500)
- Chairman: Pietro Mele
- Head coach: Adriano Di Peco
- League: FIPAV Women's Serie A2
- Website: Club home page

Uniforms
Home	Away

Roma Volley Club Femminile is the professional women's section of the Italian volleyball club Roma Volley Club. The team is based in Rome and currently plays in the Serie A2, Italy's second highest professional league. They were relegated in Serie A2 while contemporary laureating champions in the international 2024–25 CEV Women's Challenge Cup.

== Previous names ==
Due to sponsorship, the club has competed under the following names:

- Volley Group Roma (2013–2017)
- Acqua & Sapone Roma Volley Group (2017–2019)
- Acqua & Sapone Roma Volley Club (2019–2022)
- Roma Volley Club (2022–2023)
- Aeroitalia SMI Roma (2023–2024)
- SMI Roma Volley (2024–2026)
- Ferraro SMI Roma Volley (2026–)

== History ==
Volley Group Roma was founded in 2013 as a joint collaboration between three clubs: G.S. Divino Amore, A.P.D. Palocco and A.P.D. San Paolo Ostiense. Volley Group Roma played its first season (2013–2014) in Serie B2 where it finished the regular season in second place in pool G. While the club failed to reach a promotion spot in the playoffs it was still promoted to Serie B1 due to repechage. Volley Group Roma's first try in Serie B1 only lasted one season as the club finished the regular season (2014–2015) last in pool D. The club once again managed to get promoted to Serie B1 in 2016.

In 2018 Volley Group Roma acquired the rights to play in Serie A2 from another club, San Lazzaro, which had financial problems. After just one season in Serie A2 the club was relegated back to Serie B1. However, Volley Group Roma got the chance to continue playing in Serie A2 when the club Zambelli Orvieto announced that it would abandon the league.

In the summer of 2019 Volley Group Roma formed a joint partnership with the men's volleyball club A.P.D. Roma and the club changed its name to Roma Volley Club. In the 2020–2021 season Roma Volley Club won the Serie A2 promotion pool and was for the first time promoted to Serie A1. In 2022 the club was relegated back to Serie A2, but the following season it won the promotion pool once again and returned to Serie A1 for the 2023–2024 season.

In September 2024, Roma Volley hosted and won the WEVZA Cup, which qualified the club for the 2024–25 CEV Challenge Cup. The success continued in the CEV Challenge Cup and in March 2025, Roma Volley was crowned champions after defeating Chieri ’76 in the final. The 2024–25 season in Serie A1 did not go as well as the club finished second to last and was relegated to Serie A2 for the second time.

== Team ==
2026–2027 Team
Number	Player	Position	Height (m)	Birth date
1	(Montenegro) Nikoleta Perović	Opposite	1.85	1 November 1994 (age 31)
2	(Italy) Sofia Turlà	Setter	1.78	3 February 1998 (age 28)
3	(Italy) Giulia Polesello	Middle Blocker	1.85	8 April 2004 (age 22)
5	(Italy) Teresa Maria Bosso	Middle Blocker	1.80	6 January 2005 (age 21)
7	(Italy) Carolina Pecorari	Outside Hitter	1.84	7 January 2003 (age 23)
8	(Italy) Chiara Biesso	Middle Blocker	1.84	8 April 2002 (age 24)
9	(Italy) Margherita Muzi	Setter	1.82	25 January 1994 (age 32)
10	(Italy) Melissa Martinelli	Middle Blocker	1.90	23 March 1993 (age 33)
11	(Italy) Federica Baratella	Libero	1.74	13 February 2006 (age 20)
14	(Italy) Giorgia Zannoni (c)	Libero	1.75	11 February 1998 (age 28)
17	(Spain) Ana Escamilla	Outside Hitter	1.86	10 July 1998 (age 28)
27	(Hungary) Kata Török	Outside Hitter	1.82	26 May 1998 (age 28)

2025–2026 Team
Number	Player	Position	Height (m)	Birth date
1	(Montenegro) Nikoleta Perović	Opposite	1.85	1 November 1994 (age 31)
3	(Italy) Chiara Mason	Outside Hitter	1.83	11 July 2000 (age 26)
5	(Italy) Martina Cantoni	Setter	1.85	22 October 2006 (age 19)
7	(Italy) Claudia Consoli	Middle Blocker	1.83	4 February 2002 (age 24)
8	(Italy) Chiara Biesso	Middle Blocker	1.84	8 April 2002 (age 24)
11	(Italy) Federica Baratella	Libero	1.74	13 February 2006 (age 20)
~~12~~	(Italy) ~~Giulia Angelina~~ (Note: Giulia Angelina left the team on 2 February 2026.)	~~Outside Hitter~~	~~1.92~~	~~26 February 1997 (age 29)~~
13	(Italy) Ludovica Guidi	Middle Blocker	1.86	17 December 1992 (age 33)
14	(Italy) Giorgia Zannoni (c)	Libero	1.75	11 February 1998 (age 28)
15	(Italy) Carola Sbano	Libero	1.65	15 March 2006 (age 20)
17	(Italy) Teresa Bosso	Outside Hitter	1.80	6 January 2005 (age 21)
18	(Italy) Carolina Pecorari	Outside Hitter	1.84	7 January 2003 (age 23)
22	(Italy) Gaia Guiducci	Setter	1.78	9 March 2002 (age 24)
26	(Germany) Romy Jatzko (Note: Romy Jatzko joined the team in March 2026.)	Outside Hitter	1.87	26 January 2000 (age 26)

2024–2025 Team
Number	Player	Position	Height (m)	Birth date
1	(Italy) Claudia Provaroni	Outside Hitter	1.81	14 May 1998 (age 28)
2	(Cuba) Wilma Salas	Outside Hitter	1.88	9 March 1991 (age 35)
5	(Italy) Michela Ciarrocchi	Middle Blocker	1.84	16 December 1999 (age 26)
~~7~~	(France) ~~Amelie Rotar~~ (Note: Amelie Rotar left the team on 15 January 2025.)	~~Opposite~~	~~1.88~~	~~24 October 2000 (age 25)~~
8	(Italy) Michela Rucli (c)	Middle Blocker	1.85	1 May 1996 (age 30)
9	(Italy) Anna Adelusi	Outside Hitter	1.86	10 June 2003 (age 23)
10	(Italy) Luna Cicola	Libero	1.70	15 January 2004 (age 22)
11	(Germany) Marie Schölzel	Middle Blocker	1.90	1 August 1997 (age 29)
13	(Italy) Giulia Melli	Outside Hitter	1.85	8 January 1998 (age 28)
14	(Italy) Giorgia Zannoni	Libero	1.75	11 February 1998 (age 28)
17	(Serbia) Slađana Mirković	Setter	1.85	7 October 1995 (age 30)
18	(Czech Republic) Gabriela Orvošová	Opposite	1.91	28 January 2001 (age 25)
19	(Italy) Margherita Muzi	Setter	1.82	25 January 1994 (age 32)
23	(Italy) Veronica Costantini	Middle Blocker	1.91	23 March 2003 (age 23)

2023–2024 Team
Number	Player	Position	Height (m)	Birth date
1	(Albania) Erblira Bici	Opposite	1.85	27 June 1995 (age 31)
2	(Cuba) Dezirett Madan	Opposite	1.90	10 December 2002 (age 23)
3	(Italy) Marta Bechis (c)	Setter	1.80	9 April 1989 (age 37)
4	(Spain) Jessica Rivero	Outside Hitter	1.81	15 March 1995 (age 31)
5	(Italy) Michela Ciarrocchi	Middle Blocker	1.84	16 December 1999 (age 26)
~~6~~	(Netherlands) ~~Celeste Plak~~ (Note: Celeste Plak left the team on 7 November 2023.)	~~Outside Hitter~~	~~1.90~~	~~26 October 1995 (age 30)~~
6	(United States) Amber Igiede (Note: Amber Igiede joined the team in March 2024.)	Middle Blocker	1.99	8 January 2001 (age 25)
7	(Italy) Martina Ferrara	Libero	1.68	28 January 1999 (age 27)
8	(Italy) Michela Rucli	Middle Blocker	1.85	1 May 1996 (age 30)
9	(Italy) Sofia Valoppi	Libero	1.67	25 July 2003 (age 23)
11	(Brazil) Ana Beatriz Correa	Middle Blocker	1.90	7 February 1992 (age 34)
13	(Italy) Giulia Melli	Outside Hitter	1.85	8 January 1998 (age 28)
16	(United States) Courtney Schwan	Outside Hitter	1.85	9 May 1996 (age 30)
19	(Italy) Margherita Muzi	Setter	1.82	25 January 1994 (age 32)

2022–2023 Team
Number	Player	Position	Height (m)	Birth date
1	(Albania) Erblira Bici	Opposite	1.85	27 June 1995 (age 31)
3	(Italy) Marta Bechis (c)	Setter	1.80	9 April 1989 (age 37)
4	(Spain) Jessica Rivero	Outside Hitter	1.81	15 March 1995 (age 31)
5	(Italy) Michela Ciarrocchi	Middle Blocker	1.84	16 December 1999 (age 26)
7	(Italy) Martina Ferrara	Libero	1.68	28 January 1999 (age 27)
8	(Italy) Michela Rucli	Middle Blocker	1.85	1 May 1996 (age 30)
9	(Italy) Sofia Valoppi	Libero	1.67	25 July 2003 (age 23)
10	(Italy) Alice De Luca Bossa	Setter	1.77	8 June 2000 (age 26)
13	(Italy) Giulia Melli	Outside Hitter	1.85	8 January 1998 (age 28)
14	(Italy) Marika Bianchini	Outside Hitter	1.78	23 April 1993 (age 33)
15	(Italy) Sofia Rebora	Middle Blocker	1.79	23 February 1993 (age 33)
16	(Italy) Giulia Valerio	Outside Hitter	1.87	9 November 2003 (age 22)

2021–2022 Team
Number	Player	Position	Height (m)	Birth date
1	(Italy) Giorgia Avenia	Setter	1.80	4 April 1994 (age 32)
2	(Czech Republic) Veronika Trnková	Middle Blocker	1.89	13 October 1995 (age 30)
3	(Italy) Giulia Bucci	Libero	1.73	8 May 2002 (age 24)
4	(United States) Madison Bugg	Setter	1.83	4 August 1994 (age 32)
~~5~~	(Bulgaria) ~~Dobriana Rabadzhieva~~ (Note: Dobriana Rabadzhieva left the team on 3 February 2022.)	~~Outside Hitter~~	~~1.90~~	~~14 June 1991 (age 35)~~
6	(Italy) Agnese Cecconello	Middle Blocker	1.90	6 November 1999 (age 26)
7	(Italy) Maila Venturi	Libero	1.62	23 October 1996 (age 29)
8	(Germany) Lena Stigrot (c)	Outside Hitter	1.82	20 December 1994 (age 31)
~~9~~	(Italy) ~~Valeria Papa~~ (Note: Valeria Papa left the team on 18 January 2022.)	~~Outside Hitter~~	~~1.83~~	~~9 September 1989 (age 37)~~
10	(Italy) Alice Pamio	Outside Hitter	1.81	15 January 1998 (age 28)
11	(Belarus) Hanna Klimets	Opposite	1.86	4 March 1998 (age 28)
12	(Italy) Alessia Arciprete	Outside Hitter	1.81	6 September 1997 (age 29)
15	(Italy) Sofia Rebora	Middle Blocker	1.79	23 February 1993 (age 33)
17	(Italy) Clara Decortes	Opposite	1.83	7 March 1996 (age 30)

== Head coaches ==
Period	Head coach
–2018	(Italy) Fabio Cavaioli
2018–2019	(Italy) Stefano Micoli
2019–2020	(Italy) Fabio Cavaioli
2020–2021	(Italy) Luca Cristofani
2021–2022	(Italy) Stefano Saja
2022–2022	(Italy) Andrea Mafrici
2022–2026	(Italy) Giuseppe Cuccarini
2026–	(Italy) Adriano Di Peco

== Honours ==
=== International competitions ===
- CEV Challenge Cup: 1

2024–25
