= VolAlto Caserta =

Golden Tulip Volalto Caserta
- Full name: VolAlto Caserta
- Founded: 2006
- Dissolved: 2020
- Ground: Palazzetto dello Sport, Caserta, Italy (Capacity: 1,000)
- Website: Club home page

Uniforms
Home	Away

VolAlto Caserta was an Italian women's volleyball club based in Caserta. The team played in the Serie A1, Italy's highest professional league, in the 2019–2020 season.

== Previous names ==
Due to sponsorship, the club have competed under the following names:

- VolAlto Caserta (2006–2015)
- Kioto Caserta (2015–2016)
- VolAlto Caserta (2016–2017)
- Golden Tulip Volalto Caserta (2017–2018)
- Golden Tulip Volalto 2.0 Caserta (2018–2020)

== History ==
The club was established in July 2006 by the merge of two local women's volleyball in order to be more competitive. It started in Serie D and gained promotion to Serie C in its first season, through the years it was promoted to Series B2 and B1 before reaching the Serie A2 on 11 June 2014.

After being relegated to Serie B1 in 2018, the original VolAlto Caserta was closed down. However, the club was re-established under the name VolAlto 2.0 Caserta and acquired the rights to play in the 2018–2019 season of Serie A2 from Cuneo Granda Volley. The club won the promotion playoffs this season and was promoted to Serie A1.

In its debut season in Serie A1 (2019–2020), VolAlto 2.0 Caserta was in last place when the season was canceled in March 2020 due to COVID-19. The following season, VolAlto 2.0 Caserta failed to have its application for participation in Serie A1 approved by FIPAV and the club was dissolved.

== Venue ==
The club played its home matches at the Palazzetto dello Sport in Caserta. The venue has approximately 1,000 spectators capacity.

== Team ==
2017–2018 Team
Number	Player	Position	Height (m)	Birth date
2	(Italy) Martina Marangon	Libero	1.68	29 August 1998 (age 27)
4	(Italy) Sonia Galazzo	Setter	1.76	11 March 1997 (age 28)
5	(Ukraine) Karyna Denysova	Outside Hitter	1.84	28 December 1997 (age 27)
7	(Italy) Giorgia Silotto	Outside Hitter	1.80	4 April 1997 (age 28)
8	(Italy) Miriana Manig	Setter	1.77	18 July 1998 (age 27)
9	(Croatia) Lea Cvetnić	Opposite	1.85	2 February 1999 (age 26)
10	(Italy) Federica Barone	Libero	1.75	30 September 1990 (age 35)
11	(Italy) Alessia Sgherza	Outside Hitter	1.85	25 January 1997 (age 28)
12	(Italy) Noura Mabilo	Middle Blocker	1.83	22 August 1996 (age 29)
13	(Italy) Sara Tajè	Middle Blocker	1.87	3 December 1998 (age 26)
17	(Italy) Claudia Torchia	Middle Blocker	1.89	22 August 1995 (age 30)
18	(Italy) Francesca Moretti	Outside Hitter	1.78	5 February 1985 (age 40)

2016–2017 Team
Number	Player	Position	Height (m)	Birth date
2	(Croatia) Sonja Percan	Outside Hitter	1.86	8 May 1981 (age 44)
3	(Italy) Giada Boriassi	Middle Blocker	1.88	14 December 1992 (age 32)
4	(Italy) Giorgia Avenia	Setter	1.81	4 April 1994 (age 31)
5	(Italy) Giovanna Aquino	Outside Hitter	1.80	25 March 1998 (age 27)
6	(Italy) Giada Cecchetto	Libero	1.63	6 June 1991 (age 34)
7	(Italy) Marilyn Strobbe	Middle Blocker	1.88	11 February 1989 (age 36)
8	(Italy) Giusy Astarita	Outside Hitter	1.83	18 April 1988 (age 37)
9	(Italy) Beatrice Agrifoglio	Setter	1.78	1 January 1994 (age 31)
10	(Italy) Federica Barone	Libero	1.75	30 September 1990 (age 35)
12	(Italy) Giulia Pascucci	Outside Hitter	1.88	29 September 1993 (age 32)
14	(Italy) Giulia Bartesaghi	Outside Hitter	1.86	5 September 1998 (age 27)
17	(Italy) Giulia Mio Bertolo	Middle Blocker	1.87	24 May 1995 (age 30)
	(United States) Naya Crittenden	Outside Hitter	1.88	15 June 1995 (age 30)
