= Monika Bociek =

Polish volleyball player (born 1996)

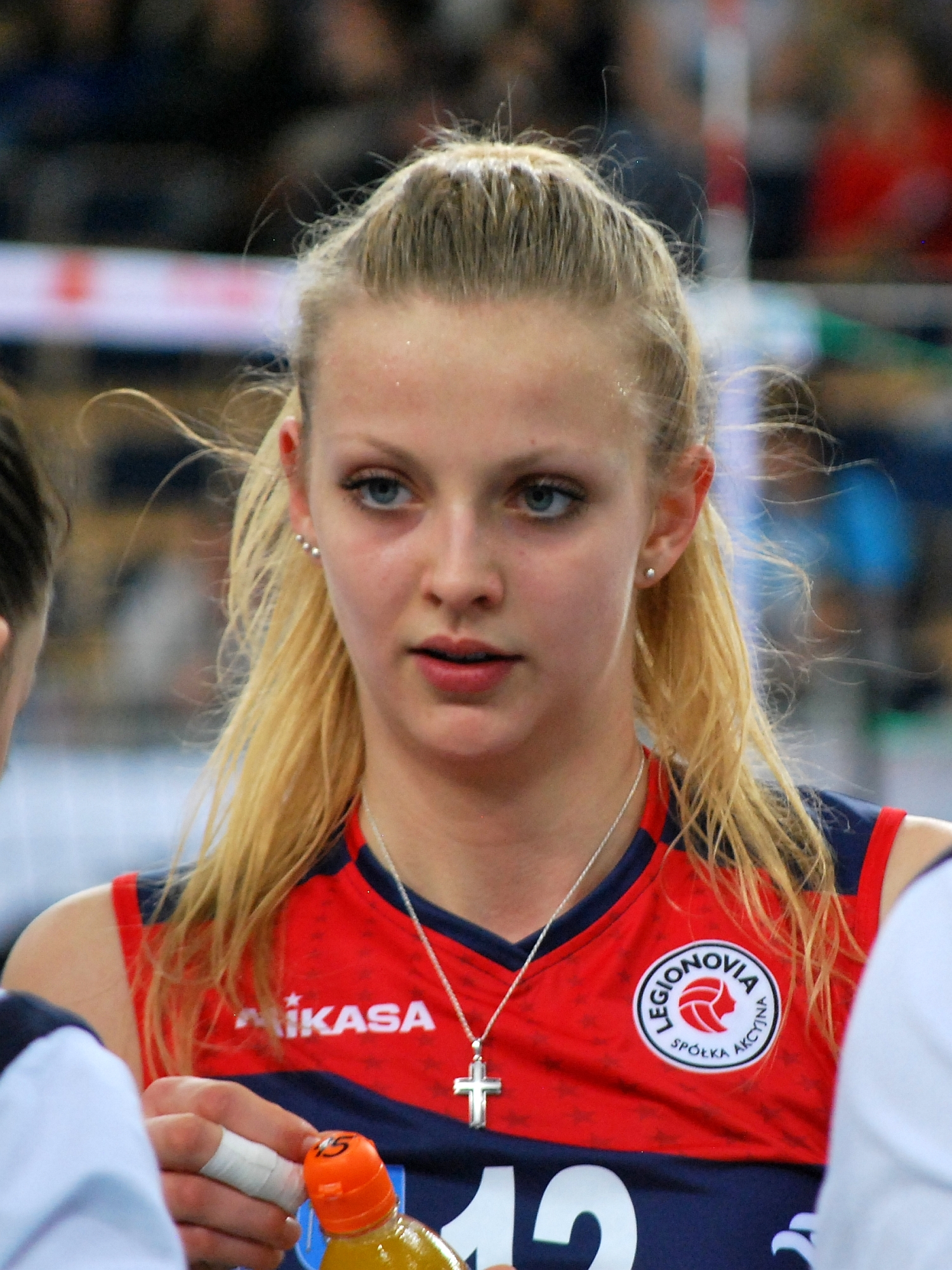

Personal information
- Full name: Monika Bociek
- Nationality: Polish
- Born: April 6, 1996 (age 30); Poland
- Height: 1.88 m (6 ft 2 in)
- Weight: 74 kg (163 lb)
- Spike: 306 cm (120 in)
- Block: 280 cm (110 in)

Volleyball information
- Position: Outside hitter
- Current team: (Poland) LTS Legionovia Legionowo
- Number: 12

Career
Years
- 2010–2013
- 2013–2014
- 2014–
Teams
- (Poland) UKS Fuks Sulejów
- (Poland) MUKS ABiS SP 64 Łódź
- (Poland) MUKS Sparta Warszawa
- (Poland) LTS Legionovia Legionowo

National team
Poland U23
Honours
Women's volleyball
Representing Poland
FIVB Nations League
Bronze medal – third place	2024 Bangkok	Team
- Last updated: 9 June 2015

Monika Gałkowska née Bociek (born 6 April 1996) is a Polish volleyball player, a member of Poland women's national volleyball team U23 and Polish club LTS Legionovia Legionowo

== Personal life ==
Monika Bociek has a three older brothers - Łukasz, who played volleyball in past, but went to seminary, Piotr and Grzegorz, who is also volleyball player and plays as an opposite hitter in Poland men's national volleyball team and ZAKSA Kędzierzyn-Koźle.

== Career ==
=== Clubs ===
In 2014, she moved from Sparta Warszawa to club of ORLEN Liga - LTS Legionovia Legionowo. In 2022, she played for Pałac Bydgoszcz. In 2023, she played for Moya Radomka Lotnisko Warszawa-Radom.

=== National team ===
In 2013, she was in Poland women's junior national team at EEVZA Junior Championship.

She competed at the 2017 FIVB Volleyball World Grand Prix and 2022 FIVB Volleyball Women's World Championship.

== Sporting achievements ==
=== Clubs ===
==== National championship ====
- 2014/2015 Polish Championship U23, with LTS Legionovia Legionowo
