= Corella =

Corella may refer to:

== Biology ==
- Corella (bird), a member of a group of cockatoos from the subgenus Licmetis
- Corella (journal), the journal of the Australian Bird Study Association, formerly called Australian Bird Bander
- Corella (lichen), a genus of lichen-forming fungi
- Corella (tunicate), a genus of sea squirts
- Corella, a pear cultivar

== People ==
- Ángel Corella, dancer with American Ballet Theatre
- Corrella, New Zealand roots reggae band

== Places ==
- Corella, Bohol, Philippines
- New Corella, Davao del Norte, Philippines
- Corella, Queensland, a locality in the Gympie Region, Queensland, Australia
- Corella, Spain
- Corella, Italy
