= PalaEvangelisti =

Sports arena in Perugia, Italy

- PalaBarton Energy
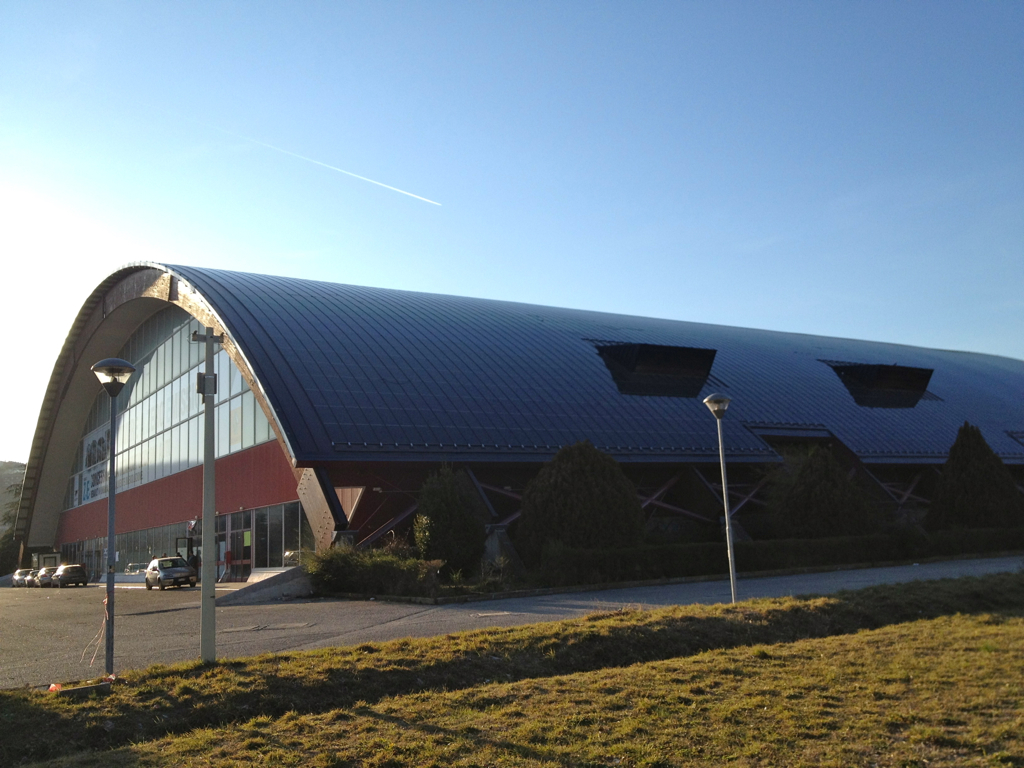
- Interactive map of PalaEvangelisti
- Location: Viale Giuseppe Meazza, 06125 Perugia, Italy
- Coordinates: 43°06′38.16″N 12°21′28.08″E
- Owner: Municipality of Perugia
- Capacity: 4,986

Construction
- Opened: 1984

The PalaEvangelisti, known as PalaBarton Energy for sponsorship purposes, is a sports arena in Perugia, Italy.

== History ==
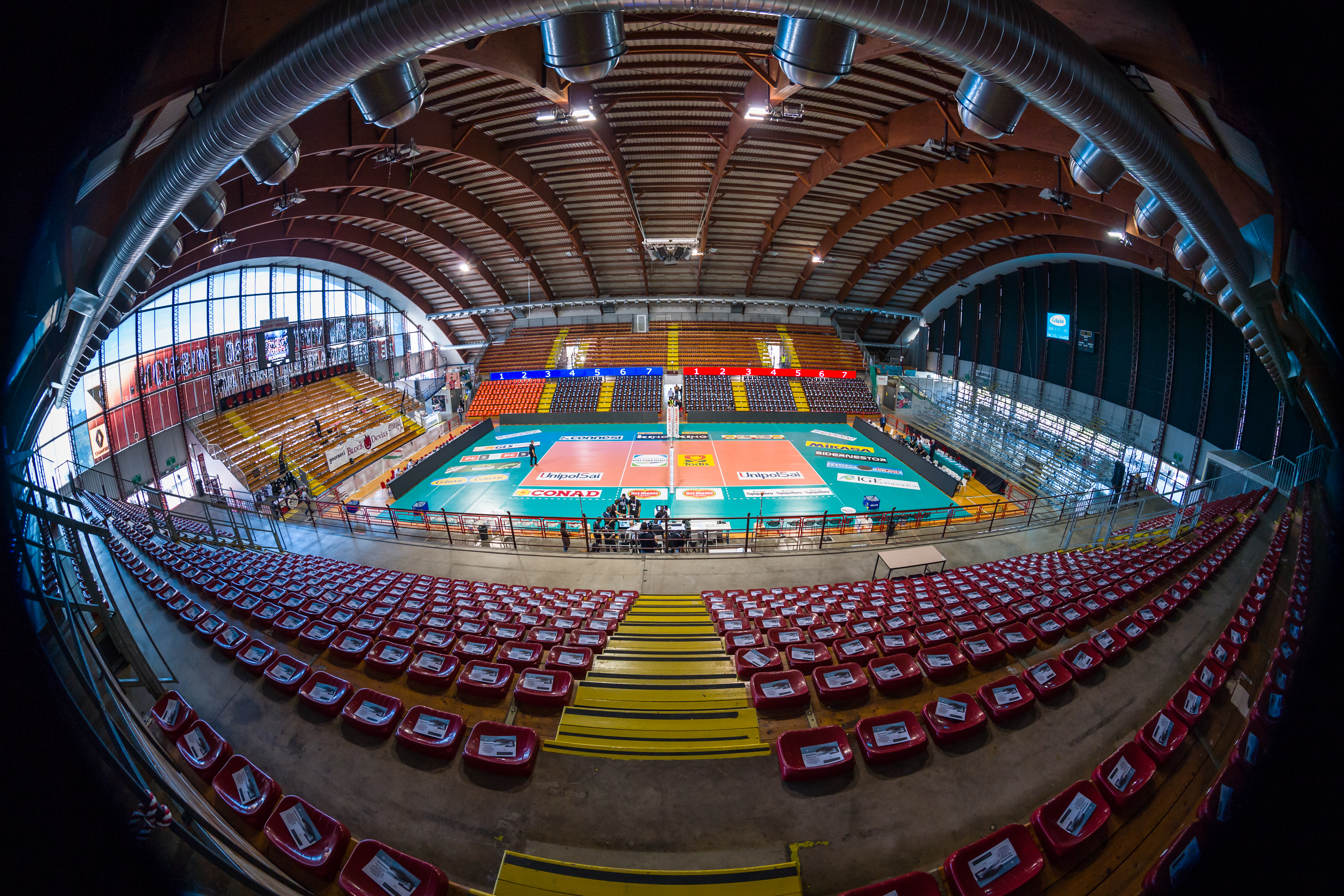
The structure's interior (2017)

Inaugurated in October 1984, it is located in the peripheral area of Pian di Massiano. It was named after Giuseppe Evangelisti (1873–1935), an anti-fascist from Perugia inspired by Garibaldi soldiers and one of the pioneers of Umbrian cycling, which originated from the Porta Sant'Angelo district.

== Events ==
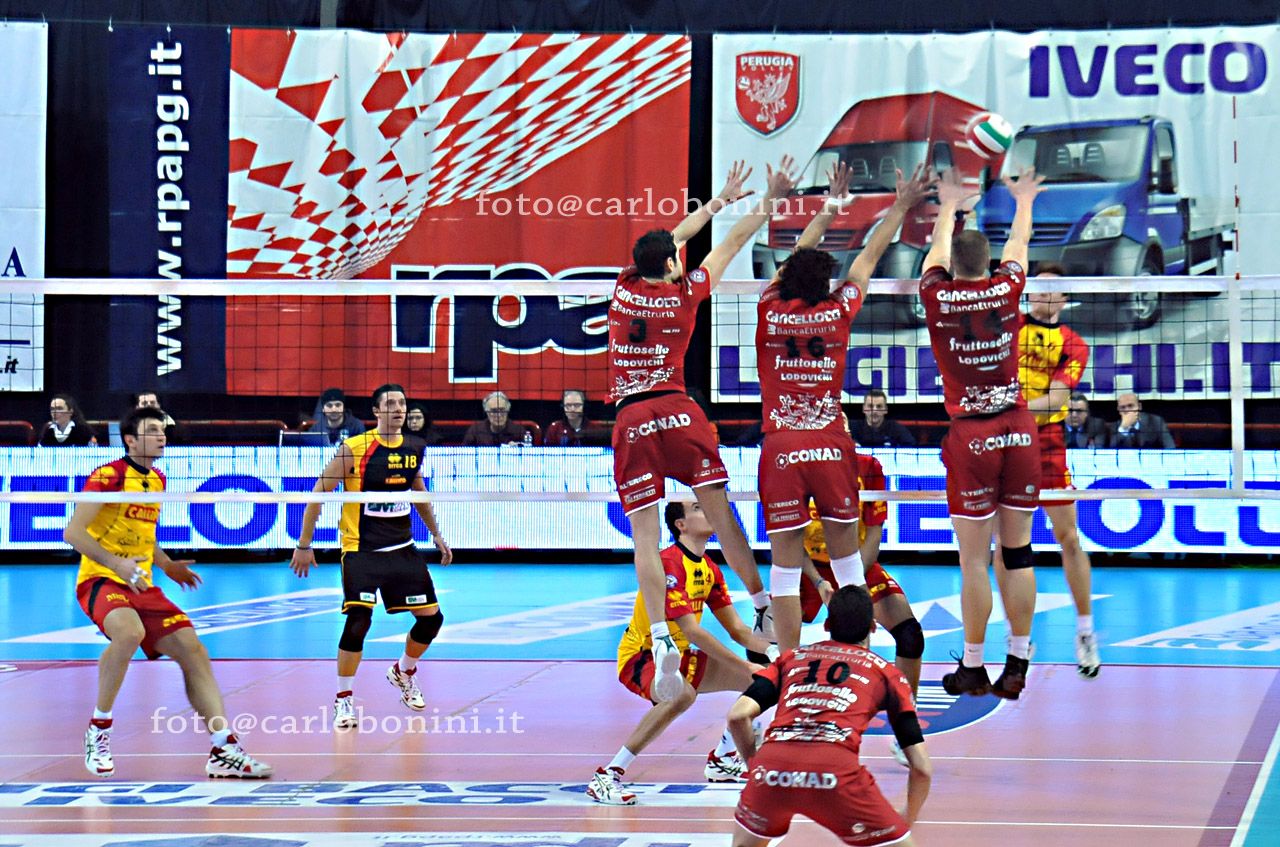
A volleyball match at the PalaEvangelisti between the home team Perugia and Callipo (2009)

The PalaEvangelisti was initially created with basketball in mind, in order to provide an adequate playing facility to Grifone Perugia, who were competing in the championship of Serie A2 at the time, and that due to the inadequacy of the PalaPellini arena they had been forced to migrate to Marsciano in the meantime.
