= Italian Women's 2 Volleyball League =

Women's Volleyball Serie A2
- Sport: Volleyball
- Founded: 1977; 49 years ago
- Administrator: FIPAV
- No. of teams: 20
- Country: Italy
- Confederation: CEV
- Level on pyramid: 2
- Promotion to: Serie A1
- Relegation to: Serie A3
- Domestic cup: Italian A2 Cup
- Website: legavolleyfemminile.it

The Italian Women's 2 Volleyball League (Italian: Serie A2 italiana di pallavolo femminile), is the second highest professional women's volleyball league in Italy. The league run under the Italian Volleyball Federation rules and promotion to the Serie A1 is awarded.

== History ==
Following the expansion of the number of teams in Serie A in the 1970s, the league was split into two divisions in 1977; Serie A1 and Serie A2. The teams in Serie A2 were split into two pools where the winners of the two pools were promoted to Serie A1. In the early 1990s the number of teams in Serie A2 was reduced to 16 teams and the two pools were replaced by a single pool. The split pools made a temporary comeback in the 1998–99 and 1999–00 seasons.

In the 2018–19 regular season of Serie A2 the number of teams increased to 18 and the teams were once again split into two pools. At the end of the regular season, the top five teams in each pool qualified for the promotion pool. The winner of the promotion pool advanced directly to Serie A1, while the teams ranked from 2nd to 7th qualified for the promotion playoffs. Just like in the previous seasons, the winner of the playoff finals also got promoted to Serie A1.

In the 2019–20 season the number of teams participating in the regular season of Serie A2 increased to 20, with 10 teams in each of the two pools. The number of teams qualified for the promotion playoffs also increased from six teams to eight teams. In the 2022–23 season it was changed so that only the four teams ranked from the 2nd to 5th in the promotion pool qualified for the playoffs. This was reverted to eight teams again in the 2025–26 season.

== Results ==
Season	Winner of the regular season	Winner of the promotion playoffs
2000–01	Giannino Pieralisi Volley	AGIL Volley
2002–02	Volley 2002 Forlì	Volley 2000 Spezzano
2002–03	Chieri Torino Volley Club	Volley Pesaro
2003–04	Santeramo Sport	Airone Pallavolo
2004–05	Volley Club Padova	Arzano Volley
2005–06	River Volley	Jogging Volley Altamura
2006–07	UYBA Volley	Sassuolo Volley
2007–08	Spes Volley Conegliano (Note: In 2007–08, the runner-up of the regular season, Florens Volley Castellana Grotte, was also promoted to Serie A1.)	Pallavolo Villanterio
2008–09	River Volley	GSO Villa Cortese
2009–10	Aprilia Volley	Universal Volley Modena
2010–11	Parma Volley Girls	Chieri Torino Volley Club
2011–12	Cuatto Volley Giaveno	Crema Volley
2012–13	AGIL Volley	Pallavolo Ornavasso
2013–14	Promoball Volleyball Flero	Azzurra Volley Firenze
2014–15	Neruda Volley	Obiettivo Risarcimento Volley
2015–16	Volley 2002 Forlì	Pro Victoria Pallavolo
2016–17	Polisportiva Filottrano Pallavolo	Volley Pesaro
2017–18	Volley Millenium Brescia	Chieri '76 Volleyball
Season	Winner of the promotion pool	Winner of the promotion playoffs
2018–19	Wealth Planet Perugia Volley	VolAlto 2.0 Caserta
2019–20	Cancelled due to COVID-19 pandemic	
2020–21	Roma Volley Club	Megavolley
2021–22	Pallavolo Pinerolo	HR Volley Macerata
2022–23	Roma Volley Club	Trentino Volley
2023–24	Wealth Planet Perugia Volley	Volley Talmassons
2024–25	Consolini Volley	HR Volley Macerata
2025–26	Volley Talmassons	Volley Millenium Brescia
