= 2022–23 Italian Women's Volleyball League =

2022–23 Italian Women's Serie A1
- League: Italian Women's Volleyball League
- Sport: Volleyball
- Duration: 22 October 2022 – 15 May 2023
- Teams: 14

Regular Season
- Season champions: Prosecco Doc Imoco Conegliano
- Top scorer: Ebrar Karakurt

Finals
- Champions: Prosecco Doc Imoco Conegliano
- Runners-up: Vero Volley Milano
- Finals MVP: Alexa Gray

Italian Women's Volleyball League seasons
- ← 2021–22 2023–24 →

The 2022–23 Serie A1 was the 78th season of the highest professional Italian Women's Volleyball League. The season took place from October to May and was contested by fourteen teams.

== Format ==
The regular season consists of 26 rounds, where the fourteen participating teams play each other twice (once home and once away). At the completion of the regular season, the eight best teams advance to the championship playoffs, the 9-12th ranked teams advance to the challenge playoffs and the teams finishing 13th and 14th are relegated to Serie A2.

The standings criteria:

- highest number of result points (points awarded for results: 3 points for 3–0 or 3–1 wins, 2 points for 3–2 win, 1 point for 2–3 loss);
- highest number of matches won;
- highest set quotient (the number of total sets won divided by the number of total sets lost);
- highest points quotient (the number of total points scored divided by the number of total points conceded).

== Teams ==
Club	Venue	Capacity	City/Area	Club locations in Italy (2022–23 season).
Bartoccini-Fortinfissi Perugia	PalaBarton	4,000	Perugia	Club locations in Italy (2022–23 season).
Cbf Balducci Hr Macerata	PalaFontescodella	2,100	Macerata	Club locations in Italy (2022–23 season).
Cuneo Granda S.Bernardo	PalaCastagnaretta	4,700	Cuneo	Club locations in Italy (2022–23 season).
E-Work Busto Arsizio	E-Work Arena	4,490	Busto Arsizio	Club locations in Italy (2022–23 season).
Igor Gorgonzola Novara	Pala Igor Gorgonzola	4,000	Novara	Club locations in Italy (2022–23 season).
Il Bisonte Firenze	PalaWanny	3,500	Florence	Club locations in Italy (2022–23 season).
Megabox Ond. Savio Vallefoglia	PalaCarneroli	1,612	Urbino	Club locations in Italy (2022–23 season).
Prosecco Doc Imoco Conegliano	PalaVerde	5,344	Villorba	Club locations in Italy (2022–23 season).
Reale Mutua Fenera Chieri	PalaFenera	1,506	Chieri	Club locations in Italy (2022–23 season).
Savino Del Bene Scandicci	PalaWanny	3,500	Florence	Club locations in Italy (2022–23 season).
Trasporti Pesanti Casalmaggiore	PalaRadi	3,519	Cremona	Club locations in Italy (2022–23 season).
Vero Volley Milano	Opiquad Arena	4,500	Monza	Club locations in Italy (2022–23 season).
Volley Bergamo 1991	PalaIntred	2,250	Bergamo	Club locations in Italy (2022–23 season).
Wash4Green Pinerolo	Pala Bus Company	1,500	Pinerolo	Club locations in Italy (2022–23 season).

== Regular season ==
=== League table ===
Pos	Team	Pld	W	L	Pts	SW	SL	SR	SPW	SPL	SPR	Qualification or relegation
1	Prosecco Doc Imoco Conegliano	26	25	1	72	75	17	4.412	2229	1817	1.227	Championship playoffs
2	Savino Del Bene Scandicci	26	21	5	63	70	29	2.414	2286	2009	1.138	Championship playoffs
3	Vero Volley Milano	26	20	6	61	69	29	2.379	2263	2015	1.123	Championship playoffs
4	Reale Mutua Fenera Chieri	26	18	8	54	59	34	1.735	2140	1952	1.096	Championship playoffs
5	Igor Gorgonzola Novara	26	19	7	51	63	40	1.575	2334	2149	1.086	Championship playoffs
6	Trasporti Pesanti Casalmaggiore	26	12	14	37	51	54	0.944	2262	2303	0.982	Championship playoffs
7	Volley Bergamo 1991	26	12	14	37	46	52	0.885	2095	2189	0.957	Championship playoffs
8	E-Work Busto Arsizio	26	12	14	36	47	51	0.922	2130	2164	0.984	Championship playoffs
9	Megabox Ond. Savio Vallefoglia	26	11	15	30	41	56	0.732	2061	2175	0.948	Challenge playoffs
10	Il Bisonte Firenze	26	9	17	30	43	58	0.741	2146	2204	0.974	Challenge playoffs
11	Cuneo Granda S.Bernardo	26	9	17	28	44	62	0.710	2252	2362	0.953	Challenge playoffs
12	Wash4Green Pinerolo	26	6	20	19	36	68	0.529	2190	2364	0.926	Challenge playoffs
13	Bartoccini-Fortinfissi Perugia	26	5	21	17	28	68	0.412	1941	2232	0.870	Relegated to Serie A2
14	Cbf Balducci Hr Macerata	26	3	23	11	19	73	0.260	1796	2190	0.820	Relegated to Serie A2

Source: Lega Volley Femminile

=== Results table ===
Home \ Away	PER	MAC	CUN	BUS	NOV	FIR	VAL	CON	CHI	SCA	CAS	MIL	BER	PIN
Bartoccini-Fortinfissi Perugia		3–2	2–3	3–0	1–3	3–1	2–3	0–3	0–3	0–3	3–0	2–3	0–3	3–2
Cbf Balducci Hr Macerata	3–1		0–3	3–1	1–3	0–3	0–3	0–3	0–3	0–3	1–3	0–3	3–2	2–3
Cuneo Granda S.Bernardo	3–2	3–0		2–3	3–2	2–3	2–3	1–3	0–3	2–3	0–3	0–3	2–3	3–1
E-Work Busto Arsizio	3–0	3–0	3–1		0–3	3–0	3–0	2–3	1–3	0–3	3–1	0–3	3–0	3–0
Igor Gorgonzola Novara	3–0	3–0	3–1	3–2		3–0	3–0	0–3	0–3	3–0	3–2	1–3	3–1	3–0
Il Bisonte Firenze	3–1	3–0	2–3	2–3	2–3		2–3	0–3	3–0	2–3	1–3	0–3	3–2	3–0
Megabox Ond. Savio Vallefoglia	3–0	3–0	3–2	3–0	1–3	0–3		0–3	1–3	1–3	2–3	1–3	3–1	3–1
Prosecco Doc Imoco Conegliano	3–0	3–0	3–0	3–1	3–1	3–1	3–1		3–0	0–3	3–1	3–1	3–0	3–2
Reale Mutua Fenera Chieri	3–0	3–0	3–1	3–1	3–1	3–0	3–0	2–3		1–3	3–0	0–3	1–3	3–1
Savino Del Bene Scandicci	3–0	3–1	3–0	2–3	2–3	3–1	3–0	1–3	3–0		3–0	2–3	3–0	3–1
Trasporti Pesanti Casalmaggiore	3–0	3–1	3–1	3–2	2–3	3–2	3–0	0–3	2–3	1–3		2–3	3–0	1–3
Vero Volley Milano	3–1	3–0	3–0	3–0	2–3	3–0	3–0	0–3	3–1	2–3	2–3		3–0	3–1
Volley Bergamo 1991	3–0	3–0	2–3	3–1	3–1	3–0	3–1	0–3	1–3	1–3	3–1	3–2		3–1
Wash4Green Pinerolo	3–1	3–2	0–3	1–3	2–3	2–3	1–3	0–3	1–3	1–3	3–2	0–3	3–0	

Source: Lega Volley Femminile
Legend: Blue = left column team win; Red = top row team win.

=== Fixtures and results ===
- All times are local, CEST (UTC+02:00) between 22 October and 29 October 2022, CET (UTC+01:00) between 30 October 2022 and 25 March 2023 and CEST (UTC+02:00) from 26 March 2023.

Round 1

Date	Time		Score		Set 1	Set 2	Set 3	Set 4	Set 5	Total	Report
22 Oct	20:30	Vero Volley Milano	3–1	Wash4Green Pinerolo	25–16	25–17	27–29	25–13		102–75	Report
23 Oct	17:00	Igor Gorgonzola Novara	3–0	Cbf Balducci Hr Macerata	25–15	25–10	25–21			75–46	Report
23 Oct	17:00	Reale Mutua Fenera Chieri	3–0	Trasporti Pesanti Casalmaggiore	25–14	25–17	25–12			75–43	Report
23 Oct	17:00	Il Bisonte Firenze	2–3	E-Work Busto Arsizio	25–16	17–25	25–16	21–25	10–15	98–97	Report
23 Oct	17:00	Megabox Ond. Savio Vallefoglia	3–2	Cuneo Granda S.Bernardo	20–25	23–25	25–18	25–23	15–12	108–103	Report
23 Oct	17:00	Bartoccini-Fortinfissi Perugia	0–3	Savino Del Bene Scandicci	17–25	24–26	21–25			62–76	Report
23 Oct	19:30	Prosecco Doc Imoco Conegliano	3–0	Volley Bergamo 1991	25–14	25–21	25–18			75–53	Report

Round 2

Date	Time		Score		Set 1	Set 2	Set 3	Set 4	Set 5	Total	Report
26 Oct	20:30	Savino Del Bene Scandicci	3–0	Megabox Ond. Savio Vallefoglia	25–18	25–14	25–16			75–48	Report
26 Oct	20:30	E-Work Busto Arsizio	2–3	Prosecco Doc Imoco Conegliano	23–25	18–25	25–22	25–22	10–15	101–109	Report
26 Oct	20:30	Trasporti Pesanti Casalmaggiore	2–3	Vero Volley Milano	25–27	21–25	25–21	26–24	10–15	107–112	Report
26 Oct	20:30	Volley Bergamo 1991	3–0	Il Bisonte Firenze	25–19	25–17	27–25			77–61	Report
26 Oct	20:30	Wash4Green Pinerolo	2–3	Igor Gorgonzola Novara	17–25	25–22	30–28	23–25	11–15	106–115	Report
26 Oct	20:30	Cbf Balducci Hr Macerata	3–1	Bartoccini-Fortinfissi Perugia	25–21	25–17	22–25	25–19		97–82	Report
27 Oct	20:30	Cuneo Granda S.Bernardo	0–3	Reale Mutua Fenera Chieri	18–25	20–25	14–25			52–75	Report

Round 3

Date	Time		Score		Set 1	Set 2	Set 3	Set 4	Set 5	Total	Report
29 Oct	20:30	Igor Gorgonzola Novara	3–0	Savino Del Bene Scandicci	25–17	25–19	25–18			75–54	Report
30 Oct	17:00	Vero Volley Milano	3–0	Volley Bergamo 1991	25–22	25–22	25–21			75–65	Report
30 Oct	17:00	Reale Mutua Fenera Chieri	3–0	Cbf Balducci Hr Macerata	25–15	25–16	25–17			75–48	Report
30 Oct	17:00	Cuneo Granda S.Bernardo	0–3	Trasporti Pesanti Casalmaggiore	17–25	20–25	21–25			58–75	Report
30 Oct	17:00	Megabox Ond. Savio Vallefoglia	0–3	Prosecco Doc Imoco Conegliano	13–25	18–25	25–27			56–77	Report
30 Oct	17:00	Bartoccini-Fortinfissi Perugia	3–0	E-Work Busto Arsizio	25–21	25–21	25–17			75–59	Report
30 Oct	19:30	Il Bisonte Firenze	3–0	Wash4Green Pinerolo	25–10	25–20	25–18			75–48	Report

Round 4

Date	Time		Score		Set 1	Set 2	Set 3	Set 4	Set 5	Total	Report
2 Nov	20:30	Prosecco Doc Imoco Conegliano	3–0	Reale Mutua Fenera Chieri	25–19	25–21	25–22			75–62	Report
2 Nov	20:30	Savino Del Bene Scandicci	3–0	Trasporti Pesanti Casalmaggiore	28–26	25–23	25–20			78–69	Report
2 Nov	20:30	E-Work Busto Arsizio	0–3	Igor Gorgonzola Novara	15–25	19–25	20–25			54–75	Report
2 Nov	20:30	Wash4Green Pinerolo	1–3	Megabox Ond. Savio Vallefoglia	20–25	25–19	16–25	22–25		83–94	Report
2 Nov	20:30	Cbf Balducci Hr Macerata	0–3	Il Bisonte Firenze	11–25	20–25	16–25			47–75	Report
2 Nov	20:45	Bartoccini-Fortinfissi Perugia	2–3	Vero Volley Milano	25–23	20–25	25–22	27–29	10–15	107–114	Report
9 Nov	20:30	Volley Bergamo 1991	2–3	Cuneo Granda S.Bernardo	28–26	22–25	25–27	25–22	13–15	113–115	Report

Round 5

Date	Time		Score		Set 1	Set 2	Set 3	Set 4	Set 5	Total	Report
5 Nov	20:30	Vero Volley Milano	3–0	Cbf Balducci Hr Macerata	25–23	25–17	25–23			75–63	Report
5 Nov	21:00	Cuneo Granda S.Bernardo	1–3	Prosecco Doc Imoco Conegliano	25–21	18–25	24–26	19–25		86–97	Report
6 Nov	17:00	Igor Gorgonzola Novara	3–1	Volley Bergamo 1991	18–25	25–21	25–19	25–21		93–86	Report
6 Nov	17:00	Reale Mutua Fenera Chieri	3–0	Il Bisonte Firenze	25–22	25–14	25–12			75–48	Report
6 Nov	17:00	Megabox Ond. Savio Vallefoglia	3–0	E-Work Busto Arsizio	25–18	25–18	25–21			75–57	Report
6 Nov	17:00	Wash4Green Pinerolo	1–3	Savino Del Bene Scandicci	13–25	18–25	25–22	8–25		64–97	Report
6 Nov	19:30	Trasporti Pesanti Casalmaggiore	3–0	Bartoccini-Fortinfissi Perugia	25–21	25–16	25–14			75–51	Report

Round 6

Date	Time		Score		Set 1	Set 2	Set 3	Set 4	Set 5	Total	Report
12 Nov	20:30	Vero Volley Milano	3–0	Megabox Ond. Savio Vallefoglia	25–19	25–10	25–18			75–47	Report
12 Nov	21:00	Igor Gorgonzola Novara	0–3	Reale Mutua Fenera Chieri	16–25	18–25	23–25			57–75	Report
13 Nov	17:00	Prosecco Doc Imoco Conegliano	3–1	Trasporti Pesanti Casalmaggiore	25–19	22–25	25–17	25–10		97–71	Report
13 Nov	17:00	Bartoccini-Fortinfissi Perugia	3–2	Wash4Green Pinerolo	25–21	25–18	23–25	19–25	15–10	107–99	Report
13 Nov	17:00	Volley Bergamo 1991	3–1	E-Work Busto Arsizio	22–25	25–14	25–19	25–23		97–81	Report
13 Nov	17:00	Cbf Balducci Hr Macerata	0–3	Savino Del Bene Scandicci	18–25	11–25	21–25			50–75	Report
13 Nov	19:30	Il Bisonte Firenze	2–3	Cuneo Granda S.Bernardo	25–20	23–25	25–16	21–25	12–15	106–101	Report

Round 7

Date	Time		Score		Set 1	Set 2	Set 3	Set 4	Set 5	Total	Report
16 Nov	20:30	Savino Del Bene Scandicci	2–3	Vero Volley Milano	25–23	21–25	25–20	24–26	8–15	103–109	Report
16 Nov	20:30	E-Work Busto Arsizio	1–3	Reale Mutua Fenera Chieri	14–25	23–25	25–20	18–25		80–95	Report
16 Nov	20:30	Cuneo Granda S.Bernardo	3–0	Cbf Balducci Hr Macerata	25–22	25–16	25–20			75–58	Report
16 Nov	20:30	Megabox Ond. Savio Vallefoglia	0–3	Il Bisonte Firenze	20–25	25–27	11–25			56–77	Report
16 Nov	20:30	Bartoccini-Fortinfissi Perugia	0–3	Volley Bergamo 1991	21–25	22–25	13–25			56–75	Report
16 Nov	20:30	Trasporti Pesanti Casalmaggiore	2–3	Igor Gorgonzola Novara	24–26	25–23	27–25	13–25	8–15	97–114	Report
16 Nov	20:30	Wash4Green Pinerolo	0–3	Prosecco Doc Imoco Conegliano	21–25	20–25	12–25			53–75	Report

Round 8

Date	Time		Score		Set 1	Set 2	Set 3	Set 4	Set 5	Total	Report
19 Nov	20:30	Trasporti Pesanti Casalmaggiore	3–1	Cbf Balducci Hr Macerata	25–16	25–22	19–25	27–25		96–88	Report
20 Nov	17:00	Prosecco Doc Imoco Conegliano	3–1	Vero Volley Milano	25–14	25–23	20–25	25–16		95–78	Report
20 Nov	17:00	Igor Gorgonzola Novara	3–0	Il Bisonte Firenze	25–19	25–23	25–22			75–64	Report
20 Nov	17:00	E-Work Busto Arsizio	3–0	Wash4Green Pinerolo	31–29	25–21	25–13			81–63	Report
20 Nov	17:00	Reale Mutua Fenera Chieri	1–3	Savino Del Bene Scandicci	25–21	20–25	21–25	23–25		89–96	Report
20 Nov	17:00	Cuneo Granda S.Bernardo	3–2	Bartoccini-Fortinfissi Perugia	24–26	24–26	25–19	25–20	15–11	113–102	Report
20 Nov	17:00	Volley Bergamo 1991	3–1	Megabox Ond. Savio Vallefoglia	20–25	25–22	25–21	25–21		95–89	Report

Round 9

Date	Time		Score		Set 1	Set 2	Set 3	Set 4	Set 5	Total	Report
9 Nov	20:30	Igor Gorgonzola Novara	0–3	Prosecco Doc Imoco Conegliano	25–27	11–25	23–25			59–77	Report
27 Nov	16:00	Il Bisonte Firenze	3–1	Bartoccini-Fortinfissi Perugia	25–17	18–25	25–18	25–20		93–80	Report
27 Nov	17:00	Megabox Ond. Savio Vallefoglia	2–3	Trasporti Pesanti Casalmaggiore	25–20	25–22	24–26	18–25	12–15	104–108	Report
27 Nov	17:00	Wash4Green Pinerolo	0–3	Cuneo Granda S.Bernardo	22–25	21–25	18–25			61–75	Report
27 Nov	18:00	Vero Volley Milano	3–1	Reale Mutua Fenera Chieri	25–21	25–19	23–25	25–21		98–86	Report
27 Nov	20:00	Cbf Balducci Hr Macerata	3–2	Volley Bergamo 1991	25–18	25–18	19–25	16–25	15–13	100–99	Report
27 Nov	20:30	Savino Del Bene Scandicci	2–3	E-Work Busto Arsizio	18–25	25–20	25–23	11–25	12–15	91–108	Report

Round 10

Date	Time		Score		Set 1	Set 2	Set 3	Set 4	Set 5	Total	Report
3 Dec	21:00	Bartoccini-Fortinfissi Perugia	1–3	Igor Gorgonzola Novara	20–25	15–25	25–23	26–28		86–101	Report
4 Dec	15:30	Volley Bergamo 1991	3–1	Wash4Green Pinerolo	25–21	24–26	25–20	25–23		99–90	Report
4 Dec	17:00	E-Work Busto Arsizio	3–0	Cbf Balducci Hr Macerata	25–20	25–16	33–31			83–67	Report
4 Dec	17:00	Reale Mutua Fenera Chieri	3–0	Megabox Ond. Savio Vallefoglia	25–21	25–16	25–20			75–57	Report
4 Dec	17:00	Cuneo Granda S.Bernardo	0–3	Vero Volley Milano	19–25	19–25	22–25			60–75	Report
4 Dec	17:00	Il Bisonte Firenze	1–3	Trasporti Pesanti Casalmaggiore	18–25	25–22	20–25	17–25		80–97	Report
4 Dec	20:00	Prosecco Doc Imoco Conegliano	0–3	Savino Del Bene Scandicci	23–25	22–25	19–25			64–75	Report

Round 11

Date	Time		Score		Set 1	Set 2	Set 3	Set 4	Set 5	Total	Report
23 Nov	20:30	Prosecco Doc Imoco Conegliano	3–1	Il Bisonte Firenze	25–18	20–25	25–18	28–26		98–87	Report
10 Dec	18:00	Reale Mutua Fenera Chieri	1–3	Volley Bergamo 1991	25–15	21–25	22–25	21–25		89–90	Report
11 Dec	17:00	Savino Del Bene Scandicci	3–0	Cuneo Granda S.Bernardo	25–20	25–22	25–16			75–58	Report
11 Dec	17:00	Megabox Ond. Savio Vallefoglia	3–0	Bartoccini-Fortinfissi Perugia	25–20	25–22	25–16			75–58	Report
11 Dec	17:00	Cbf Balducci Hr Macerata	2–3	Wash4Green Pinerolo	25–23	11–25	25–21	15–25	12–15	88–109	Report
11 Dec	18:00	Vero Volley Milano	2–3	Igor Gorgonzola Novara	19–25	16–25	25–22	25–19	11–15	96–106	Report
11 Dec	20:30	Trasporti Pesanti Casalmaggiore	3–2	E-Work Busto Arsizio	25–21	19–25	23–25	25–20	15–11	107–102	Report

Round 12

Date	Time		Score		Set 1	Set 2	Set 3	Set 4	Set 5	Total	Report
30 Nov	20:30	Cbf Balducci Hr Macerata	0–3	Prosecco Doc Imoco Conegliano	23–25	16–25	11–25			50–75	Report
17 Dec	20:00	Igor Gorgonzola Novara	3–0	Megabox Ond. Savio Vallefoglia	25–16	25–19	25–18			75–53	Report
18 Dec	17:00	Il Bisonte Firenze	0–3	Vero Volley Milano	19–25	25–27	21–25			65–77	Report
18 Dec	17:00	Volley Bergamo 1991	1–3	Savino Del Bene Scandicci	15–25	15–25	25–15	18–25		73–90	Report
18 Dec	20:00	E-Work Busto Arsizio	3–1	Cuneo Granda S.Bernardo	22–25	25–20	25–22	25–22		97–89	Report
18 Dec	20:30	Bartoccini-Fortinfissi Perugia	0–3	Reale Mutua Fenera Chieri	19–25	16–25	18–25			53–75	Report
19 Dec	20:00	Wash4Green Pinerolo	3–2	Trasporti Pesanti Casalmaggiore	18–25	26–28	26–24	25–17	15–13	110–107	Report

Round 13

Date	Time		Score		Set 1	Set 2	Set 3	Set 4	Set 5	Total	Report
26 Dec	17:00	Prosecco Doc Imoco Conegliano	3–0	Bartoccini-Fortinfissi Perugia	25–19	25–21	25–11			75–51	Report
26 Dec	17:00	Vero Volley Milano	3–0	E-Work Busto Arsizio	25–19	25–13	25–18			75–50	Report
26 Dec	17:00	Reale Mutua Fenera Chieri	3–1	Wash4Green Pinerolo	25–23	21–25	25–15	25–15		96–78	Report
26 Dec	17:00	Cuneo Granda S.Bernardo	3–2	Igor Gorgonzola Novara	25–21	25–27	25–21	17–25	15–12	107–106	Report
26 Dec	17:00	Megabox Ond. Savio Vallefoglia	3–0	Cbf Balducci Hr Macerata	25–16	25–21	25–17			75–54	Report
26 Dec	17:00	Trasporti Pesanti Casalmaggiore	3–0	Volley Bergamo 1991	25–22	25–19	25–23			75–64	Report
26 Dec	20:30	Savino Del Bene Scandicci	3–1	Il Bisonte Firenze	25–23	25–15	21–25	25–21		96–84	Report

Round 14

Date	Time		Score		Set 1	Set 2	Set 3	Set 4	Set 5	Total	Report
6 Jan	20:30	Trasporti Pesanti Casalmaggiore	2–3	Reale Mutua Fenera Chieri	25–19	19–25	17–25	25–20	12–15	98–104	Report
7 Jan	19:00	E-Work Busto Arsizio	3–0	Il Bisonte Firenze	25–20	25–19	25–20			75–59	Report
7 Jan	20:30	Volley Bergamo 1991	0–3	Prosecco Doc Imoco Conegliano	21–25	17–25	26–28			64–78	Report
7 Jan	20:30	Cbf Balducci Hr Macerata	1–3	Igor Gorgonzola Novara	21–25	18–25	26–24	18–25		83–99	Report
7 Jan	20:30	Savino Del Bene Scandicci	3–0	Bartoccini-Fortinfissi Perugia	25–13	25–17	25–19			75–49	Report
8 Jan	17:00	Wash4Green Pinerolo	0–3	Vero Volley Milano	22–25	21–25	21–25			64–75	Report
8 Jan	19:30	Cuneo Granda S.Bernardo	2–3	Megabox Ond. Savio Vallefoglia	21–25	25–21	17–25	25–19	7–15	95–105	Report

Round 15

Date	Time		Score		Set 1	Set 2	Set 3	Set 4	Set 5	Total	Report
14 Jan	19:00	Reale Mutua Fenera Chieri	3–1	Cuneo Granda S.Bernardo	25–21	25–20	22–25	25–22		97–88	Report
14 Jan	19:30	Igor Gorgonzola Novara	3–0	Wash4Green Pinerolo	25–12	25–17	25–22			75–51	Report
14 Jan	20:30	Bartoccini-Fortinfissi Perugia	3–2	Cbf Balducci Hr Macerata	25–16	25–18	23–25	24–26	15–9	112–94	Report
15 Jan	17:00	Megabox Ond. Savio Vallefoglia	1–3	Savino Del Bene Scandicci	25–21	19–25	18–25	19–25		81–96	Report
15 Jan	17:00	Prosecco Doc Imoco Conegliano	3–1	E-Work Busto Arsizio	23–25	25–18	25–18	25–21		98–82	Report
15 Jan	17:00	Il Bisonte Firenze	3–2	Volley Bergamo 1991	21–25	25–20	22–25	25–19	15–10	108–99	Report
15 Jan	18:30	Vero Volley Milano	2–3	Trasporti Pesanti Casalmaggiore	17–25	25–11	22–25	26–24	10–15	100–100	Report

Round 16

Date	Time		Score		Set 1	Set 2	Set 3	Set 4	Set 5	Total	Report
21 Jan	20:00	Prosecco Doc Imoco Conegliano	3–1	Megabox Ond. Savio Vallefoglia	25–27	25–18	25–17	25–20		100–82	Report
21 Jan	20:30	Savino Del Bene Scandicci	2–3	Igor Gorgonzola Novara	32–30	25–27	22–25	25–18	8–15	112–115	Report
21 Jan	20:30	E-Work Busto Arsizio	3–0	Bartoccini-Fortinfissi Perugia	25–17	25–14	25–19			75–50	Report
22 Jan	17:00	Volley Bergamo 1991	3–2	Vero Volley Milano	14–25	25–17	23–25	25–19	16–14	103–100	Report
22 Jan	17:00	Cbf Balducci Hr Macerata	0–3	Reale Mutua Fenera Chieri	12–25	18–25	22–25			52–75	Report
22 Jan	17:00	Trasporti Pesanti Casalmaggiore	3–1	Cuneo Granda S.Bernardo	26–24	17–25	25–20	25–22		93–91	Report
22 Jan	19:30	Wash4Green Pinerolo	2–3	Il Bisonte Firenze	25–20	25–21	16–25	23–25	15–17	104–108	Report

Round 17

Date	Time		Score		Set 1	Set 2	Set 3	Set 4	Set 5	Total	Report
4 Feb	18:00	Vero Volley Milano	3–1	Bartoccini-Fortinfissi Perugia	24–26	25–20	26–24	25–11		100–81	Report
4 Feb	19:30	Igor Gorgonzola Novara	3–2	E-Work Busto Arsizio	17–25	26–24	23–25	26–24	15–10	107–108	Report
4 Feb	20:30	Trasporti Pesanti Casalmaggiore	1–3	Savino Del Bene Scandicci	25–17	21–25	22–25	21–25		89–92	Report
5 Feb	17:00	Cuneo Granda S.Bernardo	2–3	Volley Bergamo 1991	20–25	25–19	25–16	23–25	10–15	103–100	Report
5 Feb	17:00	Megabox Ond. Savio Vallefoglia	3–1	Wash4Green Pinerolo	29–27	15–25	28–26	25–16		97–94	Report
5 Feb	17:00	Il Bisonte Firenze	3–0	Cbf Balducci Hr Macerata	25–23	25–18	25–23			75–64	Report
5 Feb	19:30	Reale Mutua Fenera Chieri	2–3	Prosecco Doc Imoco Conegliano	27–25	25–21	21–25	17–25	9–15	99–111	Report

Round 18

Date	Time		Score		Set 1	Set 2	Set 3	Set 4	Set 5	Total	Report
11 Feb	20:30	Cbf Balducci Hr Macerata	0–3	Vero Volley Milano	14–25	23–25	21–25			58–75	Report
12 Feb	17:00	Volley Bergamo 1991	3–1	Igor Gorgonzola Novara	25–21	25–20	14–25	25–19		89–85	Report
12 Feb	17:00	Prosecco Doc Imoco Conegliano	3–0	Cuneo Granda S.Bernardo	25–19	25–21	25–14			75–54	Report
12 Feb	17:00	E-Work Busto Arsizio	3–0	Megabox Ond. Savio Vallefoglia	25–18	27–25	25–12			77–55	Report
12 Feb	17:00	Bartoccini-Fortinfissi Perugia	3–0	Trasporti Pesanti Casalmaggiore	25–18	25–20	25–22			75–60	Report
12 Feb	19:30	Il Bisonte Firenze	3–0	Reale Mutua Fenera Chieri	25–16	25–14	26–24			76–54	Report
13 Feb	18:00	Savino Del Bene Scandicci	3–1	Wash4Green Pinerolo	25–18	23–25	25–22	25–16		98–81	Report

Round 19

Date	Time		Score		Set 1	Set 2	Set 3	Set 4	Set 5	Total	Report
18 Feb	18:00	Savino Del Bene Scandicci	3–1	Cbf Balducci Hr Macerata	20–25	25–17	25–17	25–21		95–80	Report
18 Feb	20:00	Reale Mutua Fenera Chieri	3–1	Igor Gorgonzola Novara	25–22	14–25	25–15	28–26		92–88	Report
18 Feb	20:30	Wash4Green Pinerolo	3–1	Bartoccini-Fortinfissi Perugia	23–25	25–19	25–17	25–14		98–75	Report
19 Feb	17:00	Trasporti Pesanti Casalmaggiore	0–3	Prosecco Doc Imoco Conegliano	23–25	13–25	24–26			60–76	Report
19 Feb	18:00	Megabox Ond. Savio Vallefoglia	1–3	Vero Volley Milano	25–20	15–25	21–25	22–25		83–95	Report
19 Feb	19:30	E-Work Busto Arsizio	3–0	Volley Bergamo 1991	25–17	25–16	25–22			75–55	Report
21 Feb	19:00	Cuneo Granda S.Bernardo	2–3	Il Bisonte Firenze	25–18	22–25	25–19	20–25	15–17	107–104	Report

Round 20

Date	Time		Score		Set 1	Set 2	Set 3	Set 4	Set 5	Total	Report
25 Feb	20:30	Il Bisonte Firenze	2–3	Megabox Ond. Savio Vallefoglia	21–25	23–25	25–23	25–22	13–15	107–110	Report
26 Feb	17:00	Vero Volley Milano	2–3	Savino Del Bene Scandicci	22–25	28–26	22–25	25–21	7–15	104–112	Report
26 Feb	17:00	Reale Mutua Fenera Chieri	3–1	E-Work Busto Arsizio	20–25	25–20	25–23	25–22		95–90	Report
26 Feb	17:00	Cbf Balducci Hr Macerata	0–3	Cuneo Granda S.Bernardo	21–25	17–25	20–25			58–75	Report
26 Feb	17:00	Volley Bergamo 1991	3–0	Bartoccini-Fortinfissi Perugia	25–21	25–15	25–21			75–57	Report
26 Feb	17:00	Prosecco Doc Imoco Conegliano	3–2	Wash4Green Pinerolo	22–25	25–22	25–22	23–25	15–12	110–106	Report
26 Feb	19:30	Igor Gorgonzola Novara	3–2	Trasporti Pesanti Casalmaggiore	25–17	22–25	14–25	25–20	15–10	101–97	Report

Round 21

Date	Time		Score		Set 1	Set 2	Set 3	Set 4	Set 5	Total	Report
5 Mar	17:00	Wash4Green Pinerolo	1–3	E-Work Busto Arsizio	25–16	20–25	21–25	22–25		88–91	Report
5 Mar	17:00	Savino Del Bene Scandicci	3–0	Reale Mutua Fenera Chieri	25–21	25–20	25–20			75–61	Report
5 Mar	17:00	Bartoccini-Fortinfissi Perugia	2–3	Cuneo Granda S.Bernardo	25–22	26–24	17–25	23–25	10–15	101–111	Report
5 Mar	17:00	Cbf Balducci Hr Macerata	1–3	Trasporti Pesanti Casalmaggiore	25–21	18–25	10–25	17–25		70–96	Report
5 Mar	18:00	Megabox Ond. Savio Vallefoglia	3–1	Volley Bergamo 1991	25–22	25–11	17–25	25–12		92–70	Report
5 Mar	20:30	Vero Volley Milano	0–3	Prosecco Doc Imoco Conegliano	23–25	15–25	23–25			61–75	Report
6 Mar	18:30	Il Bisonte Firenze	2–3	Igor Gorgonzola Novara	25–22	20–25	25–22	23–25	12–15	105–109	Report

Round 22

Date	Time		Score		Set 1	Set 2	Set 3	Set 4	Set 5	Total	Report
8 Mar	19:00	E-Work Busto Arsizio	0–3	Savino Del Bene Scandicci	23–25	23–25	19–25			65–75	Report
11 Mar	19:45	Reale Mutua Fenera Chieri	0–3	Vero Volley Milano	23–25	20–25	18–25			61–75	Report
11 Mar	20:30	Prosecco Doc Imoco Conegliano	3–1	Igor Gorgonzola Novara	22–25	25–23	25–19	25–13		97–80	Report
11 Mar	20:30	Bartoccini-Fortinfissi Perugia	3–1	Il Bisonte Firenze	25–15	27–25	17–25	25–20		94–85	Report
12 Mar	17:00	Trasporti Pesanti Casalmaggiore	3–0	Megabox Ond. Savio Vallefoglia	25–18	26–24	25–21			76–63	Report
12 Mar	17:00	Cuneo Granda S.Bernardo	3–1	Wash4Green Pinerolo	16–25	25–19	28–26	25–22		94–92	Report
12 Mar	17:00	Volley Bergamo 1991	3–0	Cbf Balducci Hr Macerata	25–20	25–22	25–20			75–62	Report

Round 23

Date	Time		Score		Set 1	Set 2	Set 3	Set 4	Set 5	Total	Report
18 Mar	18:00	Megabox Ond. Savio Vallefoglia	1–3	Reale Mutua Fenera Chieri	25–15	22–25	18–25	21–25		86–90	Report
18 Mar	20:00	Vero Volley Milano	3–0	Cuneo Granda S.Bernardo	25–22	25–17	25–15			75–54	Report
18 Mar	20:30	Trasporti Pesanti Casalmaggiore	3–2	Il Bisonte Firenze	25–19	19–25	25–21	19–25	17–15	105–105	Report
19 Mar	17:00	Cbf Balducci Hr Macerata	3–1	E-Work Busto Arsizio	22–25	25–20	25–16	26–24		98–85	Report
19 Mar	17:00	Igor Gorgonzola Novara	3–0	Bartoccini-Fortinfissi Perugia	25–17	25–22	25–14			75–53	Report
19 Mar	17:00	Wash4Green Pinerolo	3–0	Volley Bergamo 1991	25–15	25–15	25–20			75–50	Report
19 Mar	20:30	Savino Del Bene Scandicci	1–3	Prosecco Doc Imoco Conegliano	19–25	17–25	25–20	20–25		81–95	Report

Round 24

Date	Time		Score		Set 1	Set 2	Set 3	Set 4	Set 5	Total	Report
25 Mar	20:30	Cuneo Granda S.Bernardo	2–3	Savino Del Bene Scandicci	19–25	25–22	17–25	25–23	13–15	99–110	Report
26 Mar	17:00	Il Bisonte Firenze	0–3	Prosecco Doc Imoco Conegliano	15–25	20–25	17–25			52–75	Report
26 Mar	17:00	Igor Gorgonzola Novara	1–3	Vero Volley Milano	25–17	20–25	21–25	21–25		87–92	Report
26 Mar	17:00	Volley Bergamo 1991	1–3	Reale Mutua Fenera Chieri	27–29	19–25	25–21	19–25		90–100	Report
26 Mar	17:00	E-Work Busto Arsizio	3–1	Trasporti Pesanti Casalmaggiore	22–25	25–21	25–19	25–21		97–86	Report
26 Mar	19:30	Wash4Green Pinerolo	3–2	Cbf Balducci Hr Macerata	24–26	19–25	25–15	25–22	15–12	108–100	Report
26 Mar	21:00	Bartoccini-Fortinfissi Perugia	2–3	Megabox Ond. Savio Vallefoglia	27–25	21–25	23–25	25–17	13–15	109–107	Report

Round 25

Date	Time		Score		Set 1	Set 2	Set 3	Set 4	Set 5	Total	Report
1 Apr	18:00	Vero Volley Milano	3–0	Il Bisonte Firenze	25–11	25–23	25–22			75–56	Report
1 Apr	20:30	Megabox Ond. Savio Vallefoglia	1–3	Igor Gorgonzola Novara	25–16	21–25	20–25	21–25		87–91	Report
1 Apr	20:30	Cuneo Granda S.Bernardo	2–3	E-Work Busto Arsizio	22–25	26–24	25–19	22–25	12–15	107–108	Report
1 Apr	20:30	Prosecco Doc Imoco Conegliano	3–0	Cbf Balducci Hr Macerata	25–15	25–22	25–21			75–58	Report
2 Apr	17:00	Reale Mutua Fenera Chieri	3–0	Bartoccini-Fortinfissi Perugia	25–19	25–20	25–20			75–59	Report
2 Apr	17:00	Trasporti Pesanti Casalmaggiore	1–3	Wash4Green Pinerolo	17–25	28–26	21–25	19–25		85–101	Report
2 Apr	19:30	Savino Del Bene Scandicci	3–0	Volley Bergamo 1991	25–15	25–14	25–15			75–44	Report

Round 26

Date	Time		Score		Set 1	Set 2	Set 3	Set 4	Set 5	Total	Report
8 Apr	20:30	Bartoccini-Fortinfissi Perugia	0–3	Prosecco Doc Imoco Conegliano	21–25	15–25	20–25			56–75	Report
8 Apr	20:30	E-Work Busto Arsizio	0–3	Vero Volley Milano	22–25	11–25	19–25			52–75	Report
8 Apr	20:30	Il Bisonte Firenze	2–3	Savino Del Bene Scandicci	21–25	14–25	25–20	26–24	7–15	93–109	Report
8 Apr	20:30	Wash4Green Pinerolo	1–3	Reale Mutua Fenera Chieri	20–25	21–25	25–20	23–25		89–95	Report
8 Apr	20:30	Igor Gorgonzola Novara	3–1	Cuneo Granda S.Bernardo	21–25	25–19	25–21	25–17		96–82	Report
8 Apr	20:30	Cbf Balducci Hr Macerata	0–3	Megabox Ond. Savio Vallefoglia	22–25	24–26	17–25			63–76	Report
8 Apr	20:30	Volley Bergamo 1991	3–1	Trasporti Pesanti Casalmaggiore	26–24	26–24	18–25	25–17		95–90	Report

== Championship playoffs ==
- All times are local, CEST (UTC+02:00).
- The losers of the quarterfinals are moved to the second round of the Challenge playoffs.

=== Bracket ===
Quarterfinals
1	Prosecco Doc Imoco Conegliano	3	3
8	E-Work Busto Arsizio	0	0
4	Reale Mutua Fenera Chieri	2	0
5	Igor Gorgonzola Novara	3	3
2	Savino Del Bene Scandicci	3	3
7	Volley Bergamo 1991	0	0
3	Vero Volley Milano	3	2	3
6	Trasporti Pesanti Casalmaggiore	2	3	1

Semifinals
1	Prosecco Doc Imoco Conegliano	3	3
5	Igor Gorgonzola Novara	0	1
2	Savino Del Bene Scandicci	3	1	2
3	Vero Volley Milano	1	3	3

Finals
1	Prosecco Doc Imoco Conegliano	3	0	2	3	3
3	Vero Volley Milano	2	3	3	0	1

=== Quarterfinals ===
==== (1) Prosecco Doc Imoco Conegliano vs. (8) E-Work Busto Arsizio ====
Date	Time		Score		Set 1	Set 2	Set 3	Set 4	Set 5	Total	Report
15 Apr	20:30	Prosecco Doc Imoco Conegliano	3–0	E-Work Busto Arsizio	25–18	25–15	25–19			75–52	Report
18 Apr	20:00	E-Work Busto Arsizio	0–3	Prosecco Doc Imoco Conegliano	15–25	19–25	24–26			58–76	Report

Prosecco Doc Imoco Conegliano wins series, 2–0.

==== (2) Savino Del Bene Scandicci vs. (7) Volley Bergamo 1991 ====
Date	Time		Score		Set 1	Set 2	Set 3	Set 4	Set 5	Total	Report
16 Apr	17:00	Savino Del Bene Scandicci	3–0	Volley Bergamo 1991	25–23	25–21	25–20			75–64	Report
20 Apr	20:30	Volley Bergamo 1991	0–3	Savino Del Bene Scandicci	18–25	14–25	14–25			46–75	Report

Savino Del Bene Scandicci wins series, 2–0.

==== (3) Vero Volley Milano vs. (6) Trasporti Pesanti Casalmaggiore ====
Date	Time		Score		Set 1	Set 2	Set 3	Set 4	Set 5	Total	Report
16 Apr	18:30	Vero Volley Milano	3–2	Trasporti Pesanti Casalmaggiore	25–19	22–25	25–20	18–25	15–12	105–101	Report
19 Apr	20:00	Trasporti Pesanti Casalmaggiore	3–2	Vero Volley Milano	30–28	25–18	20–25	23–25	15–12	113–108	Report
23 Apr	20:30	Vero Volley Milano	3–1	Trasporti Pesanti Casalmaggiore	25–21	25–22	22–25	25–21		97–89	Report

Vero Volley Milano wins series, 2–1.

==== (4) Reale Mutua Fenera Chieri vs. (5) Igor Gorgonzola Novara ====
Date	Time		Score		Set 1	Set 2	Set 3	Set 4	Set 5	Total	Report
19 Apr	20:30	Reale Mutua Fenera Chieri	2–3	Igor Gorgonzola Novara	25–17	25–19	22–25	18–25	8–15	98–101	Report
22 Apr	20:30	Igor Gorgonzola Novara	3–0	Reale Mutua Fenera Chieri	25–20	25–22	25–15			75–57	Report

Igor Gorgonzola Novara wins series, 2–0.

=== Semifinals ===
==== (1) Prosecco Doc Imoco Conegliano vs. (5) Igor Gorgonzola Novara ====
Date	Time		Score		Set 1	Set 2	Set 3	Set 4	Set 5	Total	Report
26 Apr	20:30	Prosecco Doc Imoco Conegliano	3–0	Igor Gorgonzola Novara	25–16	25–22	26–24			76–62	Report
29 Apr	20:30	Igor Gorgonzola Novara	1–3	Prosecco Doc Imoco Conegliano	21–25	18–25	25–20	23–25		87–95	Report

Prosecco Doc Imoco Conegliano wins series, 2–0.

==== (2) Savino Del Bene Scandicci vs. (3) Vero Volley Milano ====
Date	Time		Score		Set 1	Set 2	Set 3	Set 4	Set 5	Total	Report
27 Apr	20:30	Savino Del Bene Scandicci	3–1	Vero Volley Milano	21–25	25–12	25–13	25–23		96–73	Report
30 Apr	20:30	Vero Volley Milano	3–1	Savino Del Bene Scandicci	25–22	23–25	25–22	25–21		98–90	Report
3 May	20:30	Savino Del Bene Scandicci	2–3	Vero Volley Milano	21–25	20–25	26–24	25–18	10–15	102–107	Report

Vero Volley Milano wins series, 2–1.

=== Finals ===
==== (1) Prosecco Doc Imoco Conegliano vs. (3) Vero Volley Milano ====
Date	Time		Score		Set 1	Set 2	Set 3	Set 4	Set 5	Total	Report
6 May	20:45	Prosecco Doc Imoco Conegliano	3–2	Vero Volley Milano	23–25	25–23	23–25	25–19	15–11	111–103	Report
9 May	20:45	Vero Volley Milano	3–0	Prosecco Doc Imoco Conegliano	25–22	25–23	25–18			75–63	Report
11 May	20:45	Prosecco Doc Imoco Conegliano	2–3	Vero Volley Milano	21–25	25–14	25–20	25–27	13–15	109–101	Report
13 May	21:30	Vero Volley Milano	0–3	Prosecco Doc Imoco Conegliano	24–26	20–25	17–25			61–76	Report
15 May	20:50	Prosecco Doc Imoco Conegliano	3–1	Vero Volley Milano	23–25	26–24	25–17	25–21		99–87	Report

Prosecco Doc Imoco Conegliano wins series, 3–2.

== Challenge playoffs ==
- All times are local, CEST (UTC+02:00).

=== First round ===
==== (9) Megabox Ond. Savio Vallefoglia vs. (12) Wash4Green Pinerolo ====
Date	Time		Score		Set 1	Set 2	Set 3	Set 4	Set 5	Total	Report
15 Apr	18:00	Megabox Ond. Savio Vallefoglia	3–1	Wash4Green Pinerolo	27–25	23–25	25–12	25–21		100–83	Report
19 Apr	20:30	Wash4Green Pinerolo	3–1	Megabox Ond. Savio Vallefoglia	25–20	19–25	25–23	26–24		95–92	Report
22 Apr	18:00	Megabox Ond. Savio Vallefoglia	0–3	Wash4Green Pinerolo	21–25	20–25	18–25			59–75	Report

Wash4Green Pinerolo wins series, 2–1.

==== (10) Il Bisonte Firenze vs. (11) Cuneo Granda S.Bernardo ====
Date	Time		Score		Set 1	Set 2	Set 3	Set 4	Set 5	Total	Report
15 Apr	18:00	Il Bisonte Firenze	3–2	Cuneo Granda S.Bernardo	22–25	25–19	19–25	25–19	15–10	106–98	Report
19 Apr	20:30	Cuneo Granda S.Bernardo	0–3	Il Bisonte Firenze	15–25	20–25	21–25			56–75	Report

Il Bisonte Firenze wins series, 2–0.

=== Second round ===
==== Pool A table ====
Pos	Team	Pld	W	L	Pts	SW	SL	SR	SPW	SPL	SPR	Qualification or relegation
1	Il Bisonte Firenze	2	2	0	5	6	2	3.000	181	159	1.138	Challenge final
2	Reale Mutua Fenera Chieri	2	1	1	2	3	5	0.600	163	171	0.953	
3	E-Work Busto Arsizio	2	0	2	2	4	6	0.667	199	213	0.934	

Source: Lega Volley Femminile

==== Pool A round robin ====
Date	Time		Score		Set 1	Set 2	Set 3	Set 4	Set 5	Total	Report
27 Apr	20:00	Reale Mutua Fenera Chieri	0–3	Il Bisonte Firenze	19–25	18–25	19–25			56–75	Report
30 Apr	18:00	E-Work Busto Arsizio	2–3	Il Bisonte Firenze	25–21	25–20	19–25	21–25	13–15	103–106	Report
3 May	18:00	Reale Mutua Fenera Chieri	3–2	E-Work Busto Arsizio	25–23	21–25	25–12	21–25	15–11	107–96	Report

==== Pool B table ====
Pos	Team	Pld	W	L	Pts	SW	SL	SR	SPW	SPL	SPR	Qualification or relegation
1	Trasporti Pesanti Casalmaggiore	2	2	0	6	6	0	MAX	150	117	1.282	Challenge final
2	Volley Bergamo 1991	2	1	1	3	3	3	1.000	132	131	1.008	
3	Wash4Green Pinerolo	2	0	2	0	0	6	0.000	116	150	0.773	

Source: Lega Volley Femminile

==== Pool B round robin ====
Date	Time		Score		Set 1	Set 2	Set 3	Set 4	Set 5	Total	Report
27 Apr	20:30	Trasporti Pesanti Casalmaggiore	3–0	Wash4Green Pinerolo	25–18	25–23	25–19			75–60	Report
29 Apr	20:30	Volley Bergamo 1991	3–0	Wash4Green Pinerolo	25–20	25–19	25–17			75–56	Report
3 May	20:30	Trasporti Pesanti Casalmaggiore	3–0	Volley Bergamo 1991	25–21	25–23	25–13			75–57	Report

=== Challenge final ===
Date	Time		Score		Set 1	Set 2	Set 3	Set 4	Set 5	Total	Report
6 May	19:00	Trasporti Pesanti Casalmaggiore	3–1	Il Bisonte Firenze	25–23	26–24	29–31	26–24		106–102	Report

== Final standings ==
1st place, gold medalist(s)	Prosecco Doc Imoco Conegliano
2nd place, silver medalist(s)	Vero Volley Milano
	Savino Del Bene Scandicci
	Reale Mutua Fenera Chieri
	Trasporti Pesanti Casalmaggiore
	Igor Gorgonzola Novara

Qualified for 2023–24 CEV Champions League
Qualified for 2023–24 CEV Cup
Qualified for 2023–24 CEV Challenge Cup
Qualified for 2023 WEVZA Cup

2022–23 Italian champions
Prosecco Doc Imoco Conegliano
6th title

Roberta Carraro, Kathryn Plummer, Kelsey Robinson-Cook, Federica Squarcini, Robin de Kruijf, Alessia Gennari, Stephanie Samedy, Alexa Gray, Marina Lubian, Monica De Gennaro, Isabelle Haak, Ylenia Pericati, Joanna Wołosz (C), Sarah Fahr
Head coach
Daniele Santarelli
