= 2023–24 Italian Women's Volleyball League =

2023–24 Italian Women's Serie A1
- League: Italian Women's Volleyball League
- Sport: Volleyball
- Duration: 7 October 2023 – 27 April 2024
- Teams: 14

Regular Season
- Season champions: Prosecco Doc Imoco Conegliano
- Top scorer: Paola Egonu

Finals
- Champions: Prosecco Doc Imoco Conegliano
- Runners-up: Savino Del Bene Scandicci
- Finals MVP: Isabelle Haak

Italian Women's Volleyball League seasons
- ← 2022–23 2024–25 →

The 2023–24 Serie A1 was the 79th season of the highest professional Italian Women's Volleyball League. The season took place from October to April and was contested by fourteen teams.

== Format ==
The regular season consists of 26 rounds, where the fourteen participating teams play each other twice (once home and once away). At the completion of the regular season, the eight best teams advance to the championship playoffs and the teams finishing 13th and 14th are relegated to Serie A2.

The standings criteria:

- highest number of result points (points awarded for results: 3 points for 3–0 or 3–1 wins, 2 points for 3–2 win, 1 point for 2–3 loss);
- highest number of matches won;
- highest set quotient (the number of total sets won divided by the number of total sets lost);
- highest points quotient (the number of total points scored divided by the number of total points conceded).

== Teams ==
Club	Venue	Capacity	City/Area	Club locations in Italy (2023–24 season).
Aeroitalia Smi Roma	Palazzetto dello Sport	3,300	Rome	Club locations in Italy (2023–24 season).
Allianz Vero Volley Milano	Allianz Cloud Arena	5,309	Milan	Club locations in Italy (2023–24 season).
Honda Olivero S.Bernardo Cuneo	PalaCastagnaretta	4,700	Cuneo	Club locations in Italy (2023–24 season).
Igor Gorgonzola Novara	Pala Igor Gorgonzola	4,000	Novara	Club locations in Italy (2023–24 season).
Il Bisonte Firenze	PalaWanny	3,500	Florence	Club locations in Italy (2023–24 season).
Itas Trentino	Il T Quotidiano Arena	4,000	Trento	Club locations in Italy (2023–24 season).
Megabox Ond. Savio Vallefoglia	PalaMegabox	2,001	Pesaro	Club locations in Italy (2023–24 season).
Prosecco Doc Imoco Conegliano	PalaVerde	5,344	Villorba	Club locations in Italy (2023–24 season).
Reale Mutua Fenera Chieri '76	PalaFenera	1,506	Chieri	Club locations in Italy (2023–24 season).
Savino Del Bene Scandicci	PalaWanny	3,500	Florence	Club locations in Italy (2023–24 season).
Trasporti Pesanti Casalmaggiore	PalaRadi	3,519	Cremona	Club locations in Italy (2023–24 season).
Uyba Volley Busto Arsizio	E-Work Arena	4,490	Busto Arsizio	Club locations in Italy (2023–24 season).
Volley Bergamo 1991	PalaFacchetti	2,880	Treviglio	Club locations in Italy (2023–24 season).
Wash4Green Pinerolo	Pala Bus Company	1,500	Pinerolo	Club locations in Italy (2023–24 season).

== Regular season ==
=== League table ===
Pos	Team	Pld	W	L	Pts	SW	SL	SR	SPW	SPL	SPR	Qualification or relegation
1	Prosecco Doc Imoco Conegliano	26	26	0	75	78	14	5.571	2243	1792	1.252	Championship playoffs
2	Savino Del Bene Scandicci	26	22	4	63	69	26	2.654	2230	1876	1.189	Championship playoffs
3	Allianz Vero Volley Milano	26	21	5	60	68	31	2.194	2303	2024	1.138	Championship playoffs
4	Igor Gorgonzola Novara	26	19	7	56	62	33	1.879	2248	2042	1.101	Championship playoffs
5	Reale Mutua Fenera Chieri '76	26	15	11	48	57	40	1.425	2245	2116	1.061	Championship playoffs
6	Wash4Green Pinerolo	26	12	14	37	50	54	0.926	2239	2335	0.959	Championship playoffs
7	Megabox Ond. Savio Vallefoglia	26	12	14	37	45	49	0.918	2046	2131	0.960	Championship playoffs
8	Aeroitalia Smi Roma	26	12	14	37	48	57	0.842	2229	2326	0.958	Championship playoffs
9	Trasporti Pesanti Casalmaggiore	26	10	16	31	43	57	0.754	2180	2239	0.974	
10	Il Bisonte Firenze	26	11	15	30	42	56	0.750	2138	2258	0.947	
11	Uyba Volley Busto Arsizio	26	7	19	24	36	61	0.590	2040	2221	0.919	
12	Volley Bergamo 1991	26	5	21	19	33	68	0.485	2120	2338	0.907	
13	Honda Olivero S.Bernardo Cuneo	26	7	19	18	35	68	0.515	2132	2333	0.914	Relegated to Serie A2
14	Itas Trentino	26	3	23	11	21	73	0.288	1892	2254	0.839	Relegated to Serie A2

Source: Lega Volley Femminile

=== Results table ===
Home \ Away	ROM	MIL	CUN	NOV	FIR	TRE	VAL	CON	CHI	SCA	CAS	BUS	BER	PIN
Aeroitalia Smi Roma		0–3	3–1	3–1	3–1	3–2	2–3	2–3	0–3	2–3	3–1	3–2	3–0	3–2
Allianz Vero Volley Milano	3–2		3–0	2–3	3–1	3–0	3–0	1–3	3–0	3–2	3–2	3–0	3–1	3–0
Honda Olivero S.Bernardo Cuneo	3–2	0–3		0–3	2–3	1–3	1–3	0–3	0–3	1–3	1–3	3–1	1–3	3–2
Igor Gorgonzola Novara	3–0	1–3	3–1		3–1	3–0	3–1	1–3	3–1	0–3	3–1	3–1	3–0	3–1
Il Bisonte Firenze	3–2	0–3	3–1	1–3		3–0	0–3	1–3	3–2	0–3	0–3	3–0	3–0	2–3
Itas Trentino	0–3	1–3	3–2	1–3	1–3		0–3	0–3	1–3	0–3	2–3	3–1	1–3	2–3
Megabox Ond. Savio Vallefoglia	2–3	3–0	3–1	0–3	3–1	3–0		1–3	1–3	2–3	3–0	3–0	3–1	0–3
Prosecco Doc Imoco Conegliano	3–0	3–0	3–0	3–0	3–0	3–0	3–0		3–2	3–0	3–0	3–0	3–0	3–0
Reale Mutua Fenera Chieri '76	3–0	2–3	3–1	0–3	0–3	3–1	3–0	1–3		1–3	3–0	3–0	3–0	3–0
Savino Del Bene Scandicci	3–0	0–3	3–0	3–1	3–0	3–0	3–0	1–3	3–2		3–1	3–1	3–0	3–0
Trasporti Pesanti Casalmaggiore	2–3	3–2	0–3	3–1	3–0	3–0	3–1	1–3	1–3	0–3		1–3	2–3	0–3
Uyba Volley Busto Arsizio	3–0	1–3	2–3	0–3	3–1	3–0	3–0	1–3	0–3	1–3	1–3		3–1	2–3
Volley Bergamo 1991	1–3	1–3	2–3	0–3	2–3	3–0	1–3	0–3	2–3	2–3	3–1	1–3		1–3
Wash4Green Pinerolo	3–0	2–3	2–3	1–3	1–3	3–0	3–1	2–3	3–1	0–3	1–3	3–1	3–2	

Source: Lega Volley Femminile
Legend: Blue = left column team win; Red = top row team win.

=== Fixtures and results ===
- All times are local, CEST (UTC+02:00) between 7 October and 28 October 2023 and CET (UTC+01:00) from 29 October 2023.

Round 1

Date	Time		Score		Set 1	Set 2	Set 3	Set 4	Set 5	Total	Report
7 Oct	20:30	Trasporti Pesanti Casalmaggiore	2–3	Volley Bergamo 1991	25–20	23–25	23–25	25–14	11–15	107–99	Report
8 Oct	17:00	Prosecco Doc Imoco Conegliano	3–0	Itas Trentino	25–18	25–16	25–18			75–52	Report
8 Oct	17:00	Savino Del Bene Scandicci	3–0	Il Bisonte Firenze	25–20	25–19	25–18			75–57	Report
8 Oct	17:00	Allianz Vero Volley Milano	3–0	Uyba Volley Busto Arsizio	25–21	25–10	25–12			75–43	Report
8 Oct	17:00	Megabox Ond. Savio Vallefoglia	2–3	Aeroitalia Smi Roma	25–22	20–25	19–25	25–19	12–15	101–106	Report
8 Oct	17:00	Wash4Green Pinerolo	2–3	Honda Olivero S.Bernardo Cuneo	17–25	25–23	25–17	23–25	13–15	103–105	Report
8 Oct	21:00	Reale Mutua Fenera Chieri '76	0–3	Igor Gorgonzola Novara	20–25	27–29	25–27			72–81	Report

Round 2

Date	Time		Score		Set 1	Set 2	Set 3	Set 4	Set 5	Total	Report
14 Oct	18:30	Honda Olivero S.Bernardo Cuneo	0–3	Prosecco Doc Imoco Conegliano	20–25	12–25	14–25			46–75	Report
14 Oct	20:30	Itas Trentino	1–3	Allianz Vero Volley Milano	17–25	20–25	25–23	18–25		80–98	Report
15 Oct	17:00	Igor Gorgonzola Novara	3–1	Trasporti Pesanti Casalmaggiore	25–23	25–21	22–25	25–20		97–89	Report
15 Oct	17:00	Volley Bergamo 1991	1–3	Megabox Ond. Savio Vallefoglia	25–15	25–27	23–25	23–25		96–92	Report
15 Oct	17:00	Uyba Volley Busto Arsizio	1–3	Savino Del Bene Scandicci	20–25	25–20	19–25	23–25		87–95	Report
15 Oct	17:00	Aeroitalia Smi Roma	0–3	Reale Mutua Fenera Chieri '76	18–25	20–25	20–25			58–75	Report
15 Oct	19:30	Il Bisonte Firenze	2–3	Wash4Green Pinerolo	26–24	26–24	18–25	16–25	13–15	99–113	Report

Round 3

Date	Time		Score		Set 1	Set 2	Set 3	Set 4	Set 5	Total	Report
21 Oct	18:00	Reale Mutua Fenera Chieri '76	1–3	Prosecco Doc Imoco Conegliano	19–25	23–25	25–18	25–27		92–95	Report
21 Oct	20:30	Honda Olivero S.Bernardo Cuneo	1–3	Megabox Ond. Savio Vallefoglia	25–13	23–25	22–25	22–25		92–88	Report
22 Oct	17:00	Il Bisonte Firenze	3–0	Volley Bergamo 1991	25–23	25–22	25–22			75–67	Report
22 Oct	17:00	Wash4Green Pinerolo	1–3	Igor Gorgonzola Novara	17–25	16–25	28–26	20–25		81–101	Report
22 Oct	17:00	Aeroitalia Smi Roma	3–2	Uyba Volley Busto Arsizio	25–20	25–21	20–25	23–25	15–13	108–104	Report
22 Oct	17:30	Allianz Vero Volley Milano	3–2	Savino Del Bene Scandicci	27–25	25–18	25–27	22–25	16–14	115–109	Report
22 Oct	19:30	Trasporti Pesanti Casalmaggiore	3–0	Itas Trentino	25–22	25–22	25–13			75–57	Report

Round 4

Date	Time		Score		Set 1	Set 2	Set 3	Set 4	Set 5	Total	Report
28 Oct	20:30	Volley Bergamo 1991	2–3	Honda Olivero S.Bernardo Cuneo	20–25	25–17	25–19	22–25	14–16	106–102	Report
29 Oct	17:00	Savino Del Bene Scandicci	3–1	Trasporti Pesanti Casalmaggiore	25–18	23–25	25–14	25–22		98–79	Report
29 Oct	17:00	Megabox Ond. Savio Vallefoglia	0–3	Wash4Green Pinerolo	22–25	18–25	17–25			57–75	Report
29 Oct	17:00	Itas Trentino	1–3	Il Bisonte Firenze	18–25	13–25	25–17	21–25		77–92	Report
29 Oct	18:30	Uyba Volley Busto Arsizio	0–3	Igor Gorgonzola Novara	18–25	17–25	21–25			56–75	Report
22 Nov	19:00	Allianz Vero Volley Milano	3–0	Reale Mutua Fenera Chieri '76	25–19	25–19	25–16			75–54	Report
22 Nov	20:30	Prosecco Doc Imoco Conegliano	3–0	Aeroitalia Smi Roma	25–16	25–16	25–20			75–52	Report

Round 5

Date	Time		Score		Set 1	Set 2	Set 3	Set 4	Set 5	Total	Report
1 Nov	16:00	Il Bisonte Firenze	3–2	Aeroitalia Smi Roma	25–22	25–27	25–23	22–25	15–12	112–109	Report
1 Nov	17:00	Megabox Ond. Savio Vallefoglia	1–3	Reale Mutua Fenera Chieri '76	22–25	25–18	22–25	23–25		92–93	Report
1 Nov	18:00	Igor Gorgonzola Novara	3–0	Itas Trentino	25–23	25–19	25–20			75–62	Report
1 Nov	18:00	Trasporti Pesanti Casalmaggiore	0–3	Honda Olivero S.Bernardo Cuneo	24–26	16–25	19–25			59–76	Report
1 Nov	20:30	Savino Del Bene Scandicci	1–3	Prosecco Doc Imoco Conegliano	24–26	25–27	25–23	20–25		94–101	Report
1 Nov	20:30	Volley Bergamo 1991	1–3	Allianz Vero Volley Milano	23–25	22–25	25–20	18–25		88–95	Report
1 Nov	20:30	Wash4Green Pinerolo	3–1	Uyba Volley Busto Arsizio	23–25	25–17	25–21	25–19		98–82	Report

Round 6

Date	Time		Score		Set 1	Set 2	Set 3	Set 4	Set 5	Total	Report
4 Nov	17:00	Itas Trentino	0–3	Savino Del Bene Scandicci	16–25	16–25	18–25			50–75	Report
4 Nov	20:30	Reale Mutua Fenera Chieri '76	3–0	Wash4Green Pinerolo	25–20	25–15	25–21			75–56	Report
4 Nov	20:30	Aeroitalia Smi Roma	3–0	Volley Bergamo 1991	25–21	25–21	25–22			75–64	Report
5 Nov	16:00	Allianz Vero Volley Milano	1–3	Prosecco Doc Imoco Conegliano	25–23	18–25	20–25	15–25		78–98	Report
5 Nov	17:00	Uyba Volley Busto Arsizio	3–0	Megabox Ond. Savio Vallefoglia	25–18	26–24	25–17			76–59	Report
5 Nov	17:00	Il Bisonte Firenze	0–3	Trasporti Pesanti Casalmaggiore	11–25	21–25	20–25			52–75	Report
5 Nov	20:00	Honda Olivero S.Bernardo Cuneo	0–3	Igor Gorgonzola Novara	18–25	14–25	22–25			54–75	Report

Round 7

Date	Time		Score		Set 1	Set 2	Set 3	Set 4	Set 5	Total	Report
11 Nov	15:30	Itas Trentino	3–2	Honda Olivero S.Bernardo Cuneo	25–22	23–25	28–26	23–25	15–13	114–111	Report
11 Nov	18:00	Volley Bergamo 1991	2–3	Reale Mutua Fenera Chieri '76	25–23	23–25	25–18	15–25	11–15	99–106	Report
12 Nov	16:00	Igor Gorgonzola Novara	1–3	Allianz Vero Volley Milano	16–25	25–23	23–25	21–25		85–98	Report
12 Nov	17:00	Prosecco Doc Imoco Conegliano	3–0	Il Bisonte Firenze	25–15	25–21	25–17			75–53	Report
12 Nov	17:00	Trasporti Pesanti Casalmaggiore	1–3	Uyba Volley Busto Arsizio	20–25	16–25	25–17	24–26		85–93	Report
12 Nov	17:00	Wash4Green Pinerolo	3–0	Aeroitalia Smi Roma	25–23	25–21	25–20			75–64	Report
12 Nov	19:30	Savino Del Bene Scandicci	3–0	Megabox Ond. Savio Vallefoglia	25–23	25–14	25–21			75–58	Report

Round 8

Date	Time		Score		Set 1	Set 2	Set 3	Set 4	Set 5	Total	Report
18 Nov	18:00	Reale Mutua Fenera Chieri '76	3–1	Itas Trentino	25–19	22–25	25–20	25–17		97–81	Report
18 Nov	20:30	Trasporti Pesanti Casalmaggiore	2–3	Aeroitalia Smi Roma	25–22	22–25	26–28	25–21	13–15	111–111	Report
19 Nov	17:00	Allianz Vero Volley Milano	3–0	Wash4Green Pinerolo	25–16	25–19	25–17			75–52	Report
19 Nov	17:00	Megabox Ond. Savio Vallefoglia	0–3	Igor Gorgonzola Novara	27–29	23–25	23–25			73–79	Report
19 Nov	17:00	Il Bisonte Firenze	3–0	Uyba Volley Busto Arsizio	25–17	25–22	25–22			75–61	Report
19 Nov	17:00	Honda Olivero S.Bernardo Cuneo	1–3	Savino Del Bene Scandicci	11–25	19–25	25–18	20–25		75–93	Report
19 Nov	19:30	Volley Bergamo 1991	0–3	Prosecco Doc Imoco Conegliano	15–25	22–25	17–25			54–75	Report

Round 9

Date	Time		Score		Set 1	Set 2	Set 3	Set 4	Set 5	Total	Report
25 Nov	18:00	Igor Gorgonzola Novara	3–1	Il Bisonte Firenze	25–16	44–42	23–25	25–22		117–105	Report
25 Nov	20:30	Itas Trentino	0–3	Megabox Ond. Savio Vallefoglia	24–26	18–25	14–25			56–76	Report
26 Nov	17:00	Prosecco Doc Imoco Conegliano	3–0	Trasporti Pesanti Casalmaggiore	27–25	25–23	25–17			77–65	Report
26 Nov	17:00	Savino Del Bene Scandicci	3–2	Reale Mutua Fenera Chieri '76	25–17	20–25	26–28	25–21	15–11	111–102	Report
26 Nov	17:00	Uyba Volley Busto Arsizio	2–3	Honda Olivero S.Bernardo Cuneo	25–20	22–25	22–25	27–25	12–15	108–110	Report
26 Nov	17:00	Aeroitalia Smi Roma	0–3	Allianz Vero Volley Milano	21–25	18–25	22–25			61–75	Report
26 Nov	19:30	Wash4Green Pinerolo	3–2	Volley Bergamo 1991	22–25	26–24	19–25	26–24	15–10	108–108	Report

Round 10

Date	Time		Score		Set 1	Set 2	Set 3	Set 4	Set 5	Total	Report
2 Dec	21:00	Wash4Green Pinerolo	0–3	Savino Del Bene Scandicci	19–25	29–31	19–25			67–81	Report
3 Dec	17:00	Allianz Vero Volley Milano	3–2	Trasporti Pesanti Casalmaggiore	24–26	27–25	25–18	23–25	15–2	114–96	Report
3 Dec	17:00	Reale Mutua Fenera Chieri '76	3–0	Uyba Volley Busto Arsizio	25–16	25–23	25–21			75–60	Report
3 Dec	17:00	Volley Bergamo 1991	3–0	Itas Trentino	28–26	25–16	25–16			78–58	Report
3 Dec	17:00	Megabox Ond. Savio Vallefoglia	3–1	Il Bisonte Firenze	21–25	25–18	25–15	25–22		96–80	Report
3 Dec	17:00	Aeroitalia Smi Roma	3–1	Honda Olivero S.Bernardo Cuneo	18–25	25–15	25–17	26–24		94–81	Report
3 Dec	19:30	Igor Gorgonzola Novara	1–3	Prosecco Doc Imoco Conegliano	19–25	14–25	25–23	18–25		76–98	Report

Round 11

Date	Time		Score		Set 1	Set 2	Set 3	Set 4	Set 5	Total	Report
9 Dec	20:30	Uyba Volley Busto Arsizio	3–1	Volley Bergamo 1991	25–27	25–15	26–24	25–22		101–88	Report
9 Dec	21:00	Trasporti Pesanti Casalmaggiore	0–3	Wash4Green Pinerolo	18–25	23–25	21–25			62–75	Report
10 Dec	17:00	Prosecco Doc Imoco Conegliano	3–0	Megabox Ond. Savio Vallefoglia	25–18	25–20	25–17			75–55	Report
10 Dec	17:00	Il Bisonte Firenze	3–2	Reale Mutua Fenera Chieri '76	28–26	25–23	21–25	17–25	15–11	106–110	Report
10 Dec	17:00	Honda Olivero S.Bernardo Cuneo	0–3	Allianz Vero Volley Milano	18–25	15–25	14–25			47–75	Report
10 Dec	17:00	Itas Trentino	0–3	Aeroitalia Smi Roma	22–25	20–25	14–25			56–75	Report
11 Dec	20:30	Savino Del Bene Scandicci	3–1	Igor Gorgonzola Novara	25–11	28–26	21–25	25–21		99–83	Report

Round 12

Date	Time		Score		Set 1	Set 2	Set 3	Set 4	Set 5	Total	Report
16 Dec	18:00	Aeroitalia Smi Roma	2–3	Savino Del Bene Scandicci	16–25	14–25	26–24	25–21	7–15	88–110	Report
16 Dec	20:30	Volley Bergamo 1991	0–3	Igor Gorgonzola Novara	23–25	15–25	20–25			58–75	Report
16 Dec	20:30	Megabox Ond. Savio Vallefoglia	3–0	Trasporti Pesanti Casalmaggiore	25–15	25–22	25–21			75–58	Report
17 Dec	17:00	Il Bisonte Firenze	0–3	Allianz Vero Volley Milano	19–25	22–25	20–25			61–75	Report
17 Dec	17:00	Wash4Green Pinerolo	2–3	Prosecco Doc Imoco Conegliano	21–25	26–24	14–25	25–23	13–15	99–112	Report
17 Dec	19:30	Reale Mutua Fenera Chieri '76	3–1	Honda Olivero S.Bernardo Cuneo	25–18	25–19	17–25	26–24		93–86	Report
17 Dec	20:30	Uyba Volley Busto Arsizio	3–0	Itas Trentino	25–23	25–14	25–19			75–56	Report

Round 13

Date	Time		Score		Set 1	Set 2	Set 3	Set 4	Set 5	Total	Report
22 Dec	20:00	Itas Trentino	2–3	Wash4Green Pinerolo	25–17	17–25	24–26	26–24	20–22	112–114	Report
23 Dec	20:30	Prosecco Doc Imoco Conegliano	3–0	Uyba Volley Busto Arsizio	25–20	25–15	25–18			75–53	Report
23 Dec	20:30	Savino Del Bene Scandicci	3–0	Volley Bergamo 1991	25–11	25–21	25–14			75–46	Report
23 Dec	20:30	Allianz Vero Volley Milano	3–0	Megabox Ond. Savio Vallefoglia	25–20	25–13	25–10			75–43	Report
23 Dec	20:30	Igor Gorgonzola Novara	3–0	Aeroitalia Smi Roma	25–10	33–31	25–14			83–55	Report
23 Dec	20:30	Trasporti Pesanti Casalmaggiore	1–3	Reale Mutua Fenera Chieri '76	17–25	20–25	25–23	16–25		78–98	Report
23 Dec	20:30	Honda Olivero S.Bernardo Cuneo	2–3	Il Bisonte Firenze	25–21	25–17	19–25	20–25	9–15	98–103	Report

Round 14

Date	Time		Score		Set 1	Set 2	Set 3	Set 4	Set 5	Total	Report
26 Dec	17:00	Itas Trentino	0–3	Prosecco Doc Imoco Conegliano	19–25	18–25	21–25			58–75	Report
26 Dec	17:00	Uyba Volley Busto Arsizio	1–3	Allianz Vero Volley Milano	28–30	25–17	15–25	17–25		85–97	Report
26 Dec	17:00	Igor Gorgonzola Novara	3–1	Reale Mutua Fenera Chieri '76	25–19	26–24	23–25	25–18		99–86	Report
26 Dec	17:00	Volley Bergamo 1991	3–1	Trasporti Pesanti Casalmaggiore	25–23	25–19	19–25	25–18		94–85	Report
26 Dec	17:00	Aeroitalia Smi Roma	2–3	Megabox Ond. Savio Vallefoglia	35–37	18–25	25–16	25–17	4–15	107–110	Report
26 Dec	17:00	Honda Olivero S.Bernardo Cuneo	3–2	Wash4Green Pinerolo	20–25	25–13	23–25	25–22	17–15	110–100	Report
26 Dec	18:00	Il Bisonte Firenze	0–3	Savino Del Bene Scandicci	17–25	19–25	18–25			54–75	Report

Round 15

Date	Time		Score		Set 1	Set 2	Set 3	Set 4	Set 5	Total	Report
6 Jan	17:00	Reale Mutua Fenera Chieri '76	3–0	Aeroitalia Smi Roma	25–21	25–18	25–16			75–55	Report
6 Jan	17:30	Savino Del Bene Scandicci	3–1	Uyba Volley Busto Arsizio	25–22	18–25	25–15	25–11		93–73	Report
6 Jan	20:30	Megabox Ond. Savio Vallefoglia	3–1	Volley Bergamo 1991	25–20	22–25	25–18	25–13		97–76	Report
7 Jan	17:00	Prosecco Doc Imoco Conegliano	3–0	Honda Olivero S.Bernardo Cuneo	25–22	25–21	25–19			75–62	Report
7 Jan	19:30	Allianz Vero Volley Milano	3–0	Itas Trentino	25–13	25–23	25–22			75–58	Report
7 Jan	20:45	Wash4Green Pinerolo	1–3	Il Bisonte Firenze	22–25	18–25	26–24	20–25		86–99	Report
17 Feb	20:30	Trasporti Pesanti Casalmaggiore	3–1	Igor Gorgonzola Novara	22–25	25–23	25–19	26–24		98–91	Report

Round 16

Date	Time		Score		Set 1	Set 2	Set 3	Set 4	Set 5	Total	Report
13 Jan	17:00	Itas Trentino	2–3	Trasporti Pesanti Casalmaggiore	28–26	26–24	18–25	19–25	15–17	106–117	Report
13 Jan	21:00	Savino Del Bene Scandicci	0–3	Allianz Vero Volley Milano	20–25	21–25	15–25			56–75	Report
14 Jan	17:00	Prosecco Doc Imoco Conegliano	3–2	Reale Mutua Fenera Chieri '76	26–28	25–19	21–25	30–28	15–9	117–109	Report
14 Jan	17:00	Volley Bergamo 1991	2–3	Il Bisonte Firenze	25–22	29–27	11–25	19–25	16–18	100–117	Report
14 Jan	17:00	Megabox Ond. Savio Vallefoglia	3–1	Honda Olivero S.Bernardo Cuneo	25–17	25–20	16–25	25–21		91–83	Report
14 Jan	17:00	Igor Gorgonzola Novara	3–1	Wash4Green Pinerolo	26–24	23–25	25–22	25–14		99–85	Report
14 Jan	19:30	Uyba Volley Busto Arsizio	3–0	Aeroitalia Smi Roma	25–23	25–16	25–23			75–62	Report

Round 17

Date	Time		Score		Set 1	Set 2	Set 3	Set 4	Set 5	Total	Report
20 Jan	20:30	Wash4Green Pinerolo	3–1	Megabox Ond. Savio Vallefoglia	27–25	21–25	25–19	32–30		105–99	Report
21 Jan	17:00	Aeroitalia Smi Roma	2–3	Prosecco Doc Imoco Conegliano	25–21	23–25	26–24	18–25	4–15	96–110	Report
21 Jan	17:00	Honda Olivero S.Bernardo Cuneo	1–3	Volley Bergamo 1991	22–25	25–15	23–25	27–29		97–94	Report
21 Jan	17:00	Igor Gorgonzola Novara	3–1	Uyba Volley Busto Arsizio	25–12	25–15	24–26	25–10		99–63	Report
21 Jan	17:00	Il Bisonte Firenze	3–0	Itas Trentino	25–19	25–23	25–15			75–57	Report
21 Jan	19:30	Reale Mutua Fenera Chieri '76	2–3	Allianz Vero Volley Milano	25–21	23–25	23–25	27–25	13–15	111–111	Report
21 Jan	21:00	Trasporti Pesanti Casalmaggiore	0–3	Savino Del Bene Scandicci	22–25	20–25	17–25			59–75	Report

Round 18

Date	Time		Score		Set 1	Set 2	Set 3	Set 4	Set 5	Total	Report
27 Jan	21:00	Prosecco Doc Imoco Conegliano	3–0	Savino Del Bene Scandicci	25–15	25–21	25–17			75–53	Report
28 Jan	17:00	Allianz Vero Volley Milano	3–1	Volley Bergamo 1991	25–19	23–25	25–20	25–19		98–83	Report
28 Jan	17:00	Reale Mutua Fenera Chieri '76	3–0	Megabox Ond. Savio Vallefoglia	25–20	25–19	25–17			75–56	Report
28 Jan	17:00	Aeroitalia Smi Roma	3–1	Il Bisonte Firenze	25–19	20–25	25–23	25–18		95–85	Report
28 Jan	17:00	Uyba Volley Busto Arsizio	2–3	Wash4Green Pinerolo	25–15	25–22	22–25	27–29	6–15	105–106	Report
28 Jan	18:30	Itas Trentino	1–3	Igor Gorgonzola Novara	12–25	25–21	21–25	22–25		80–96	Report
28 Jan	19:00	Honda Olivero S.Bernardo Cuneo	1–3	Trasporti Pesanti Casalmaggiore	21–25	22–25	25–20	20–25		88–95	Report

Round 19

Date	Time		Score		Set 1	Set 2	Set 3	Set 4	Set 5	Total	Report
3 Feb	20:00	Trasporti Pesanti Casalmaggiore	3–0	Il Bisonte Firenze	25–21	34–32	25–18			84–71	Report
3 Feb	20:30	Megabox Ond. Savio Vallefoglia	3–0	Uyba Volley Busto Arsizio	25–17	25–21	25–22			75–60	Report
4 Feb	16:00	Volley Bergamo 1991	1–3	Aeroitalia Smi Roma	20–25	25–17	19–25	21–25		85–92	Report
4 Feb	17:00	Wash4Green Pinerolo	3–1	Reale Mutua Fenera Chieri '76	25–21	29–27	20–25	25–20		99–93	Report
4 Feb	17:00	Igor Gorgonzola Novara	3–1	Honda Olivero S.Bernardo Cuneo	25–10	25–17	18–25	25–17		93–69	Report
4 Feb	17:00	Savino Del Bene Scandicci	3–0	Itas Trentino	25–18	25–13	25–17			75–48	Report
4 Feb	17:30	Prosecco Doc Imoco Conegliano	3–0	Allianz Vero Volley Milano	25–23	25–18	25–18			75–59	Report

Round 20

Date	Time		Score		Set 1	Set 2	Set 3	Set 4	Set 5	Total	Report
10 Feb	18:00	Megabox Ond. Savio Vallefoglia	2–3	Savino Del Bene Scandicci	25–22	25–21	21–25	17–25	10–15	98–108	Report
10 Feb	21:00	Allianz Vero Volley Milano	2–3	Igor Gorgonzola Novara	27–29	25–19	19–25	25–22	12–15	108–110	Report
11 Feb	17:00	Uyba Volley Busto Arsizio	1–3	Trasporti Pesanti Casalmaggiore	19–25	25–21	20–25	22–25		86–96	Report
11 Feb	17:00	Reale Mutua Fenera Chieri '76	3–0	Volley Bergamo 1991	25–20	29–27	25–22			79–69	Report
11 Feb	17:00	Aeroitalia Smi Roma	3–2	Wash4Green Pinerolo	25–23	19–25	19–25	25–21	15–9	103–103	Report
11 Feb	17:00	Honda Olivero S.Bernardo Cuneo	1–3	Itas Trentino	20–25	18–25	25–15	19–25		82–90	Report
11 Feb	18:30	Il Bisonte Firenze	1–3	Prosecco Doc Imoco Conegliano	19–25	25–22	18–25	22–25		84–97	Report

Round 21

Date	Time		Score		Set 1	Set 2	Set 3	Set 4	Set 5	Total	Report
24 Feb	18:00	Savino Del Bene Scandicci	3–0	Honda Olivero S.Bernardo Cuneo	25–14	25–15	25–14			75–43	Report
24 Feb	19:00	Igor Gorgonzola Novara	3–1	Megabox Ond. Savio Vallefoglia	21–25	25–20	25–15	25–13		96–73	Report
24 Feb	20:30	Aeroitalia Smi Roma	3–1	Trasporti Pesanti Casalmaggiore	17–25	25–23	25–17	25–22		92–87	Report
25 Feb	17:00	Itas Trentino	1–3	Reale Mutua Fenera Chieri '76	27–29	25–21	20–25	14–25		86–100	Report
25 Feb	17:00	Prosecco Doc Imoco Conegliano	3–0	Volley Bergamo 1991	25–17	25–14	25–21			75–52	Report
25 Feb	17:00	Uyba Volley Busto Arsizio	3–1	Il Bisonte Firenze	25–16	25–20	20–25	25–18		95–79	Report
25 Feb	18:30	Wash4Green Pinerolo	2–3	Allianz Vero Volley Milano	25–23	18–25	25–22	19–25	10–15	97–110	Report

Round 22

Date	Time		Score		Set 1	Set 2	Set 3	Set 4	Set 5	Total	Report
2 Mar	20:30	Trasporti Pesanti Casalmaggiore	1–3	Prosecco Doc Imoco Conegliano	25–17	15–25	16–25	19–25		75–92	Report
2 Mar	21:00	Volley Bergamo 1991	1–3	Wash4Green Pinerolo	20–25	25–11	18–25	24–26		87–87	Report
3 Mar	12:00	Allianz Vero Volley Milano	3–2	Aeroitalia Smi Roma	23–25	25–19	18–25	25–21	18–16	109–106	Report
3 Mar	15:00	Reale Mutua Fenera Chieri '76	1–3	Savino Del Bene Scandicci	22–25	19–25	25–22	22–25		88–97	Report
3 Mar	17:00	Il Bisonte Firenze	1–3	Igor Gorgonzola Novara	16–25	25–19	20–25	20–25		81–94	Report
3 Mar	17:00	Megabox Ond. Savio Vallefoglia	3–0	Itas Trentino	25–21	25–23	25–15			75–59	Report
3 Mar	19:30	Honda Olivero S.Bernardo Cuneo	3–1	Uyba Volley Busto Arsizio	25–11	20–25	25–19	25–18		95–73	Report

Round 23

Date	Time		Score		Set 1	Set 2	Set 3	Set 4	Set 5	Total	Report
6 Mar	16:00	Savino Del Bene Scandicci	3–0	Wash4Green Pinerolo	25–19	25–16	25–13			75–48	Report
6 Mar	20:30	Trasporti Pesanti Casalmaggiore	3–2	Allianz Vero Volley Milano	25–18	17–25	25–21	23–25	15–13	105–102	Report
6 Mar	20:30	Uyba Volley Busto Arsizio	0–3	Reale Mutua Fenera Chieri '76	19–25	23–25	20–25			62–75	Report
6 Mar	20:30	Prosecco Doc Imoco Conegliano	3–0	Igor Gorgonzola Novara	25–14	27–25	25–17			77–56	Report
6 Mar	20:30	Il Bisonte Firenze	0–3	Megabox Ond. Savio Vallefoglia	15–25	28–30	24–26			67–81	Report
6 Mar	20:30	Honda Olivero S.Bernardo Cuneo	3–2	Aeroitalia Smi Roma	25–21	27–25	23–25	18–25	18–16	111–112	Report
20 Mar	20:00	Itas Trentino	1–3	Volley Bergamo 1991	25–22	20–25	27–29	19–25		91–101	Report

Round 24

Date	Time		Score		Set 1	Set 2	Set 3	Set 4	Set 5	Total	Report
9 Mar	17:00	Reale Mutua Fenera Chieri '76	0–3	Il Bisonte Firenze	20–25	23–25	19–25			62–75	Report
9 Mar	18:00	Allianz Vero Volley Milano	3–0	Honda Olivero S.Bernardo Cuneo	25–19	25–23	25–20			75–62	Report
9 Mar	20:30	Megabox Ond. Savio Vallefoglia	1–3	Prosecco Doc Imoco Conegliano	25–22	17–25	22–25	13–25		77–97	Report
10 Mar	17:00	Igor Gorgonzola Novara	0–3	Savino Del Bene Scandicci	22–25	21–25	14–25			57–75	Report
10 Mar	17:00	Wash4Green Pinerolo	1–3	Trasporti Pesanti Casalmaggiore	15–25	25–15	14–25	19–25		73–90	Report
10 Mar	17:00	Volley Bergamo 1991	1–3	Uyba Volley Busto Arsizio	25–18	20–25	18–25	17–25		80–93	Report
10 Mar	17:00	Aeroitalia Smi Roma	3–2	Itas Trentino	25–18	25–20	19–25	20–25	15–10	104–98	Report

Round 25

Date	Time		Score		Set 1	Set 2	Set 3	Set 4	Set 5	Total	Report
16 Mar	17:00	Allianz Vero Volley Milano	3–1	Il Bisonte Firenze	25–19	20–25	25–17	25–21		95–82	Report
16 Mar	18:00	Trasporti Pesanti Casalmaggiore	3–1	Megabox Ond. Savio Vallefoglia	21–25	25–19	25–12	25–16		96–72	Report
16 Mar	18:30	Itas Trentino	3–1	Uyba Volley Busto Arsizio	25–23	18–25	25–18	25–21		93–87	Report
16 Mar	20:30	Prosecco Doc Imoco Conegliano	3–0	Wash4Green Pinerolo	25–19	25–18	25–21			75–58	Report
17 Mar	17:00	Savino Del Bene Scandicci	3–0	Aeroitalia Smi Roma	25–18	25–17	25–20			75–55	Report
17 Mar	19:30	Honda Olivero S.Bernardo Cuneo	0–3	Reale Mutua Fenera Chieri '76	21–25	18–25	19–25			58–75	Report
17 Mar	19:30	Igor Gorgonzola Novara	3–0	Volley Bergamo 1991	25–22	25–17	25–14			75–53	Report

Round 26

Date	Time		Score		Set 1	Set 2	Set 3	Set 4	Set 5	Total	Report
24 Mar	17:00	Uyba Volley Busto Arsizio	1–3	Prosecco Doc Imoco Conegliano	25–22	20–25	20–25	19–25		84–97	Report
24 Mar	17:00	Volley Bergamo 1991	2–3	Savino Del Bene Scandicci	25–21	25–22	19–25	17–25	9–15	95–108	Report
24 Mar	17:00	Megabox Ond. Savio Vallefoglia	3–0	Allianz Vero Volley Milano	27–25	25–19	25–22			77–66	Report
24 Mar	17:00	Aeroitalia Smi Roma	3–1	Igor Gorgonzola Novara	25–21	19–25	25–23	25–12		94–81	Report
24 Mar	17:00	Reale Mutua Fenera Chieri '76	3–0	Trasporti Pesanti Casalmaggiore	25–18	25–15	25–21			75–54	Report
24 Mar	17:00	Il Bisonte Firenze	3–1	Honda Olivero S.Bernardo Cuneo	24–26	25–22	25–20	25–21		99–89	Report
24 Mar	17:00	Wash4Green Pinerolo	3–0	Itas Trentino	25–14	26–24	25–19			76–57	Report

== Championship playoffs ==
- All times are local, CET (UTC+01:00) between 27 March and 30 March 2024 and CEST (UTC+02:00) from 31 March 2024.

=== Bracket ===
Quarterfinals
1	Prosecco Doc Imoco Conegliano	3	3
8	Aeroitalia Smi Roma	0	0
4	Igor Gorgonzola Novara	2	3	3
5	Reale Mutua Fenera Chieri '76	3	0	1
2	Savino Del Bene Scandicci	3	3
7	Megabox Ond. Savio Vallefoglia	1	0
3	Allianz Vero Volley Milano	3	3
6	Wash4Green Pinerolo	2	1

Semifinals
1	Prosecco Doc Imoco Conegliano	3	2	3
4	Igor Gorgonzola Novara	0	3	0
2	Savino Del Bene Scandicci	3	3
3	Allianz Vero Volley Milano	0	0

Finals
1	Prosecco Doc Imoco Conegliano	2	3	3	3
2	Savino Del Bene Scandicci	3	2	1	1

=== Quarterfinals ===
==== (1) Prosecco Doc Imoco Conegliano vs. (8) Aeroitalia Smi Roma ====
Date	Time		Score		Set 1	Set 2	Set 3	Set 4	Set 5	Total	Report
27 Mar	19:30	Prosecco Doc Imoco Conegliano	3–0	Aeroitalia Smi Roma	25–21	25–18	25–18			75–57	Report
31 Mar	20:30	Aeroitalia Smi Roma	0–3	Prosecco Doc Imoco Conegliano	17–25	13–25	21–25			51–75	Report

Prosecco Doc Imoco Conegliano wins series, 2–0.

==== (2) Savino Del Bene Scandicci vs. (7) Megabox Ond. Savio Vallefoglia ====
Date	Time		Score		Set 1	Set 2	Set 3	Set 4	Set 5	Total	Report
27 Mar	20:30	Savino Del Bene Scandicci	3–1	Megabox Ond. Savio Vallefoglia	25–16	25–17	21–25	25–23		96–81	Report
30 Mar	15:30	Megabox Ond. Savio Vallefoglia	0–3	Savino Del Bene Scandicci	18–25	24–26	17–25			59–76	Report

Savino Del Bene Scandicci wins series, 2–0.

==== (3) Allianz Vero Volley Milano vs. (6) Wash4Green Pinerolo ====
Date	Time		Score		Set 1	Set 2	Set 3	Set 4	Set 5	Total	Report
27 Mar	20:30	Allianz Vero Volley Milano	3–2	Wash4Green Pinerolo	25–20	23–25	23–25	25–21	15–13	111–104	Report
31 Mar	17:00	Wash4Green Pinerolo	1–3	Allianz Vero Volley Milano	13–25	25–22	16–25	21–25		75–97	Report

Allianz Vero Volley Milano wins series, 2–0.

==== (4) Igor Gorgonzola Novara vs. (5) Reale Mutua Fenera Chieri '76 ====
Date	Time		Score		Set 1	Set 2	Set 3	Set 4	Set 5	Total	Report
27 Mar	20:30	Igor Gorgonzola Novara	2–3	Reale Mutua Fenera Chieri '76	18–25	25–17	26–28	25–19	8–15	102–104	Report
30 Mar	20:30	Reale Mutua Fenera Chieri '76	0–3	Igor Gorgonzola Novara	22–25	30–32	21–25			73–82	Report
3 Apr	20:30	Igor Gorgonzola Novara	3–1	Reale Mutua Fenera Chieri '76	22–25	25–21	25–22	25–23		97–91	Report

Igor Gorgonzola Novara wins series, 2–1.

=== Semifinals ===
==== (1) Prosecco Doc Imoco Conegliano vs. (4) Igor Gorgonzola Novara ====
Date	Time		Score		Set 1	Set 2	Set 3	Set 4	Set 5	Total	Report
7 Apr	20:30	Prosecco Doc Imoco Conegliano	3–0	Igor Gorgonzola Novara	25–19	25–12	25–20			75–51	Report
10 Apr	19:00	Igor Gorgonzola Novara	3–2	Prosecco Doc Imoco Conegliano	25–17	25–23	17–25	14–25	15–12	96–102	Report
13 Apr	20:30	Prosecco Doc Imoco Conegliano	3–0	Igor Gorgonzola Novara	25–19	25–22	25–20			75–61	Report

Prosecco Doc Imoco Conegliano wins series, 2–1.

==== (2) Savino Del Bene Scandicci vs. (3) Allianz Vero Volley Milano ====
Date	Time		Score		Set 1	Set 2	Set 3	Set 4	Set 5	Total	Report
6 Apr	20:30	Savino Del Bene Scandicci	3–0	Allianz Vero Volley Milano	25–23	25–22	25–22			75–67	Report
10 Apr	20:30	Allianz Vero Volley Milano	0–3	Savino Del Bene Scandicci	22–25	22–25	21–25			65–75	Report

Savino Del Bene Scandicci wins series, 2–0.

=== Finals ===
==== (1) Prosecco Doc Imoco Conegliano vs. (2) Savino Del Bene Scandicci ====
Date	Time		Score		Set 1	Set 2	Set 3	Set 4	Set 5	Total	Report
17 Apr	20:30	Prosecco Doc Imoco Conegliano	2–3	Savino Del Bene Scandicci	22–25	25–16	22–25	26–24	15–17	110–107	Report
20 Apr	20:30	Savino Del Bene Scandicci	2–3	Prosecco Doc Imoco Conegliano	25–23	21–25	25–19	23–25	11–15	105–107	Report
24 Apr	20:30	Prosecco Doc Imoco Conegliano	3–1	Savino Del Bene Scandicci	30–28	23–25	29–27	25–22		107–102	Report
27 Apr	20:45	Savino Del Bene Scandicci	1–3	Prosecco Doc Imoco Conegliano	25–23	17–25	17–25	21–25		80–98	Report

Prosecco Doc Imoco Conegliano wins series, 3–1.

== Final standings ==
1st place, gold medalist(s)	Prosecco Doc Imoco Conegliano
2nd place, silver medalist(s)	Savino Del Bene Scandicci
	Allianz Vero Volley Milano
	Igor Gorgonzola Novara
	Reale Mutua Fenera Chieri '76

Qualified for 2024–25 CEV Champions League
Qualified for 2024–25 CEV Cup
Qualified for 2024–25 CEV Challenge Cup

2023–24 Italian champions
Prosecco Doc Imoco Conegliano
7th title

Vittoria Piani, Kathryn Plummer, Kelsey Robinson-Cook, Federica Squarcini, Robin de Kruijf, Alessia Gennari, Marina Lubian, Monica De Gennaro, Isabelle Haak, Madison Bugg, Joanna Wołosz (C), Khalia Lanier, Sarah Fahr, Anna Bardaro
Head coach
Daniele Santarelli
