= Yasmina Akrari =

Italian volleyball player (born 1993)

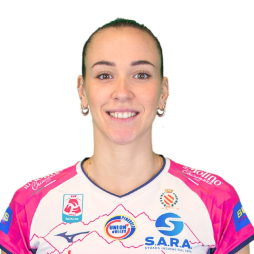

Personal information
- Born: 31 August 1993 (age 33) Turin, Piedmont, Italy
- Height: 1.85 m (6 ft 1 in)

Volleyball information
- Position: Middle blocker
- Current club: Chieri '76
- Number: 18

Career
- Years: Team
- 2009–2017: Lilliput
- 2017–2020: Chieri '76
- 2020–2026: Pinerolo
- 2026-: Chieri '76

National team
- Years: Team
- 2024–: Italy
Honours
Women's volleyball
Representing Italy
FIVB World Championship
Gold medal – first place	2025 Thailand	Team
FIVB Nations League
Bronze medal – third place	2026 Macau	Team

Yasmina Akrari (born 31 August 1993) is an Italian volleyball player who plays as a middle blocker for Pinerolo and the Italy national team.

== Career ==
=== Clubs ===
Akrari, who was born to an Italian mother and a Moroccan father, began her career in the 2009–10 season at Lilliput of Settimo Torinese in Serie B2, a club she remained with for eight seasons, playing in Serie B1 from the 2010–11 season and in Serie A2 from the 2015–16 season.

In the 2017–18 season, Akrari was signed by Chieri '76 in Serie A2. With the Piedmontese team, at the end of the season, the team was promoted to Serie A1, a category in which she has played beginning at the 2018–19 season.

In the 2020–21 season, Akrari returned to play in the second division, moving to Pinerolo, with whom, at the end of the 2021–22 season, the team was promoted to Serie A1, where she has played, with the same club, since the 2022–23 season.

=== National team ===
In 2024, Akrari received her first call-ups to the Italian national team, with which, in 2025, she won the gold medal at the World Championship.
