= Trentino Volley (women's volleyball) =

Italian women's volleyball clubs

Itas Trentino
- Full name: Trentino Volley
- Founded: 2022
- Ground: Il T Quotidiano Arena; Trento, Italy (Capacity: 4,360)
- Chairman: Bruno Da Re
- Head coach: Alessandro Beltrami
- League: FIPAV Women's Serie A2
- Website: Club home page

Uniforms
Home	Away

Trentino Volley Femminile is the professional women's section of the Italian volleyball club Trentino Volley. The team is based in Trento in northern Italy and currently plays in the Serie A2, Italy's second highest professional league.

== Previous names ==
Due to sponsorship, the club has competed under the following names:

- Itas Trentino (2022–present)

== History ==
On 6 June 2022 Trentino Volley announced the opening of the women's section of the club. By acquiring the rights to play in Serie A2 from Trentino Rosa the club was able to jump directly to the second division of the Italian women's league.

In its first season in Serie A2 (2022–23) Trentino Volley finished the regular season as the best ranked team in Pool A. In the subsequent promotion pool play the team finished second and advanced to the promotion playoffs. By winning the final against Volley Millenium Brescia Trentino Volley was promoted to Serie A1 for the 2023–24 season. The club finished its debut season in Serie A1 in last place and was relegated back to Serie A2 again for the 2024–25 season.

== Team ==
2026–2027 Team
Number	Player	Position	Height (m)	Birth date
1	(Italy) Virginia Ristori	Outside Hitter	1.80	4 September 1999 (age 27)
2	(Italy) Emma Rizzieri	Setter	1.78	27 August 2002 (age 24)
3	(Italy) Sofia Luchi	Libero	1.68	15 May 2008 (age 18)
4	(Slovenia) Polona Frelih	Opposite	1.86	28 April 2004 (age 22)
5	(Italy) Sofia Monza (c)	Setter	1.74	11 May 2002 (age 24)
7	(Italy) Ludovica Sismondi	Middle Blocker	1.91	7 July 2007 (age 19)
8	(Italy) Emma Galbero	Outside Hitter	1.83	21 August 2001 (age 25)
9	(Italy) Rebecca Laporta	Libero	1.65	20 March 2003 (age 23)
10	(Italy) Alice Pamio	Outside Hitter	1.81	15 January 1998 (age 28)
11	(Italy) Arianna Bovolenta	Middle Blocker	1.90	15 July 2008 (age 18)
13	(Italy) Martina Susio	Outside Hitter	1.85	25 January 2007 (age 19)
15	(Italy) Emily Cheyenne Colombo	Outside Hitter	1.76	15 July 2007 (age 19)
16	(Italy) Greta Iob	Middle Blocker	1.88	23 June 2006 (age 20)

2025–2026 Team
Number	Player	Position	Height (m)	Birth date
1	(Italy) Virginia Ristori	Outside Hitter	1.80	4 September 1999 (age 27)
2	(Italy) Francesca Cosi	Middle Blocker	1.89	27 March 2000 (age 26)
3	(Italy) Beatrice Zeni	Libero	1.63	27 July 2008 (age 18)
4	(Italy) Giada Guerra	Setter	1.68	7 March 2004 (age 22)
5	(Italy) Sofia Monza (c)	Setter	1.74	11 May 2002 (age 24)
7	(Italy) Emily Cheyenne Colombo	Outside Hitter	1.76	15 July 2007 (age 19)
8	(Italy) Giulia Marconato	Middle Blocker	1.90	26 April 2003 (age 23)
9	(Italy) Rebecca Laporta	Libero	1.65	20 March 2003 (age 23)
10	(Italy) Alice Pamio	Outside Hitter	1.81	15 January 1998 (age 28)
13	(Italy) Dominika Giuliani	Outside Hitter	1.92	26 November 2004 (age 21)
16	(Italy) Greta Iob	Middle Blocker	1.88	23 June 2006 (age 20)
17	(Italy) Erica Andrich	Opposite	1.85	10 February 1998 (age 28)
23	(Latvia) Irbe Lazda	Opposite	1.90	4 March 2001 (age 25)

2024–2025 Team
Number	Player	Position	Height (m)	Birth date
1	(Italy) Virginia Ristori	Outside Hitter	1.80	4 September 1999 (age 27)
2	(Italy) Beatrice Zeni	Libero	1.68	27 July 2008 (age 18)
3	(Germany) Emilia Weske	Opposite	1.89	26 March 2001 (age 25)
5	(Italy) Ilaria Batte	Setter	1.85	27 June 2005 (age 21)
7	(Italy) Aneta Zojzi	Outside Hitter	1.86	23 May 2003 (age 23)
8	(Italy) Giulia Marconato	Middle Blocker	1.90	26 April 2003 (age 23)
9	(Italy) Silvia Fiori	Libero	1.62	18 July 1994 (age 32)
10	(Italy) Maria Teresa Bassi	Opposite	1.88	28 September 2002 (age 24)
11	(Italy) Vittoria Prandi (c)	Setter	1.80	4 November 1994 (age 31)
12	(Italy) Beatrice Molinaro	Middle Blocker	1.90	15 June 1995 (age 31)
13	(Italy) Dominika Giuliani	Outside Hitter	1.92	26 November 2004 (age 21)
16	(Italy) Greta Iob	Middle Blocker	1.88	23 June 2006 (age 20)
17	(Italy) Valeria Pizzolato	Middle Blocker	1.82	20 May 1999 (age 27)
18	(Italy) Dayana Kosareva	Outside Hitter	1.86	24 August 1999 (age 27)

2023–2024 Team
Number	Player	Position	Height (m)	Birth date
1	(Russia) Yana Shcherban	Outside Hitter	1.85	6 September 1989 (age 37)
2	(Italy) Viola Passaro (Note: Viola Passaro joined the team on 14 December 2023.)	Setter	1.82	30 November 2004 (age 21)
~~3~~	(Italy) ~~Chiara Mason~~ (Note: Chiara Mason left the team on 15 January 2024.)	~~Outside Hitter~~	~~1.83~~	~~11 July 2000 (age 26)~~
4	(Venezuela) Roslandy Acosta (Note: Roslandy Acosta joined the team on 30 November 2023.)	Outside Hitter	1.90	25 February 1992 (age 34)
5	(Italy) Francesca Michieletto	Outside Hitter	1.84	10 September 1997 (age 29)
6	(Italy) Gaia Guiducci	Setter	1.78	9 March 2002 (age 24)
7	(Italy) Rossella Olivotto (c)	Middle Blocker	1.89	27 April 1991 (age 35)
8	(Italy) Giulia Marconato	Middle Blocker	1.90	26 April 2003 (age 23)
9	(Italy) Martina Stocco	Setter	1.90	27 January 2000 (age 26)
10	(Italy) Francesca Parlangeli	Libero	1.64	23 February 1990 (age 36)
11	(United States) Carly DeHoog	Opposite	1.94	14 October 1994 (age 31)
12	(Italy) Giulia Angelina	Outside Hitter	1.92	26 February 1997 (age 29)
~~13~~	(Italy) ~~Valentina Zago~~ (Note: Valentina Zago left the team on 1 February 2024.)	~~Opposite~~	~~1.87~~	~~21 February 1990 (age 36)~~
14	(Netherlands) Iris Scholten (Note: Iris Scholten joined the team on 1 February 2024.)	Opposite	1.91	15 November 1999 (age 26)
16	(United States) Madeleine Gates	Middle Blocker	1.90	30 October 1998 (age 27)
18	(Italy) Gaia Moretto	Middle Blocker	1.92	18 September 1994 (age 32)
19	(Italy) Alessandra Mistretta	Libero	1.65	5 February 2002 (age 24)

2022–2023 Team
Number	Player	Position	Height (m)	Birth date
3	(Italy) Chiara Mason	Outside Hitter	1.83	11 July 2000 (age 26)
4	(Italy) Ester Serafini	Setter	1.75	7 January 2001 (age 25)
5	(Italy) Francesca Michieletto	Outside Hitter	1.84	10 September 1997 (age 29)
6	(Italy) Silvia Fondriest (c)	Middle Blocker	1.88	29 December 1988 (age 37)
7	(Italy) Asia Bonelli	Setter	1.81	4 September 2000 (age 26)
8	(Italy) Chiara Libardi	Libero	1.70	9 December 1997 (age 28)
9	(Italy) Martina Stocco	Setter	1.90	27 January 2000 (age 26)
10	(Italy) Francesca Parlangeli	Libero	1.64	23 February 1990 (age 36)
11	(United States) Carly DeHoog	Opposite	1.94	14 October 1994 (age 31)
12	(Italy) Jessica Joly	Outside Hitter	1.80	6 January 2000 (age 26)
13	(Italy) Elena Bisio	Opposite	1.83	4 June 2000 (age 26)
15	(Italy) Annalisa Michieletto	Outside Hitter	1.78	7 May 2000 (age 26)
17	(Italy) Denise Meli	Middle Blocker	1.83	9 April 2001 (age 25)
18	(Italy) Gaia Moretto	Middle Blocker	1.92	18 September 1994 (age 32)

== Head coaches ==
Period	Head coach
2022–2023	(Italy) Stefano Saja
2023–2023	(Italy) Marco Sinibaldi
2023–2025	(Italy) Davide Mazzanti
2025–2025	(Italy) Michele Parusso
2025–	(Italy) Alessandro Beltrami
