= Adelina Budăi-Ungureanu =

Romanian volleyball player (born 2000)

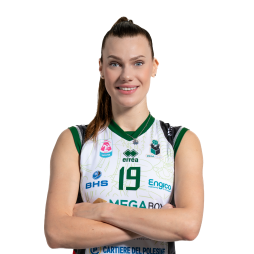

Personal information
- Born: July 29, 2000 (age 26); Botosani, Romania
- Height: 187 cm (6 ft 2 in)
- Spike: 307 cm (121 in)
- Block: 290 cm (114 in)

Volleyball information
- Position: Outside hitter
- Current club: (Italy) Union Volley Pinerolo
- Number: 19

Career
Years	Teams
2017-2018	(Romania) Dinamo Bucuresti
2018-2019	(Romania) CSM Bucuresti
2019–2021	(Italy) Cuneo Granda Volley
2021–2022	(Italy) Futura Volley Busto Arsizio
2022–2024	(Italy) Union Volley Pinerolo

National team
2017–	Romania

Adelina Budăi-Ungureanu (born July 29, 2000) is a Romanian volleyball player, a member of the Romania women's national volleyball team and Italian club Union Volley Pinerolo. She competed at the 2019 Women's European Volleyball Championship and at the 2021 Women's European Volleyball Championship.
