= Lilliput Pallavolo =

Lilliput Settimo Torinese
- Full name: Lilliput Pallavolo
- Ground: PalaSanBenigno, Settimo Torinese, Italy (Capacity: 200)
- Chairman: Gianfranco Salmaso
- League: FIPAV Women's Serie C
- Website: Club home page

Uniforms
Home	Away

Lilliput Pallavolo is an Italian women's volleyball club based in Settimo Torinese and currently playing in the Serie C.

== Previous names ==
Due to sponsorship, the club have competed under the following names:

- Lilliput Settimo Torinese (2015–present)

== History ==
The club was established in the 1980s and has female teams (girls, juniors, seniors) participating at local, regional and national competitions. The senior team played in the Series B2 and B1 during the 2000s. At the end of the 2014–15 season, the club won promotion to the Serie A2. After two seasons at Serie A2, the club declined its participation in the following season, opting instead to play the 2017–18 season in Serie B1.

== Venue ==
The club plays its home matches at the Palazzetto dello Sport (also known as PalaSanBenigno) in Settimo Torinese.

== Team ==
The club last Serie A2 squad, Season 2016–2017, as of March 2017.

Number	Player	Position	Height (m)	Weight (kg)	Birth date
4	(Italy) Emanuela Fiore	Opposite	1.85		25 October 1986 (age 39)
5	(Italy) Giulia Malvicini	Setter	1.84		5 September 1997 (age 28)
6	(Italy) Alessia Midriano	Middle blocker	1.83		6 June 1982 (age 43)
7	(Italy) Maria Luisa Cumino	Setter	1.77		22 April 1992 (age 33)
9	(Italy) Giorgia De Stefani	Outside hitter	1.76		27 February 1991 (age 34)
10	(Italy) Francesca Parlangeli	Libero	1.64		23 February 1990 (age 35)
11	(Romania) Adriana Vîlcu	Outside hitter	1.84		11 January 1991 (age 34)
12	(Italy) Federica Biganzoli	Outside hitter	1.80		5 November 1987 (age 38)
14	(Italy) Fatim Kone	Middle blocker	1.85		25 October 2000 (age 25)
15	(Italy) Sara Cortelazzo	Outside hitter	1.80		20 November 1993 (age 31)
18	(Italy) Yasmina Akrari	Middle blocker	1.85		31 August 1993 (age 32)
