= Denise Meli =

Italian volleyball player (born 2001)

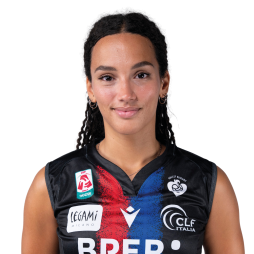

Personal information
- Born: 9 April 2001 (age 25); Bagno a Ripoli, Italy
- Height: 183 cm (6 ft 0 in)
Honours
Women's volleyball
Representing Italy
FIVB Nations League
Bronze medal – third place	2026 Macau	Team
European Championship
Silver medal – second place	2026 Azerbaijan-Czechia-Sweden-Turkey	Team

Denise Meli (born 9 April 2001) is an Italian volleyball player.

== Life and career ==
Born in Bagno a Ripoli, at 17 years old Meli sustained a serious fracture of the tibia and fibula, which threatened the continuation of her career. In 2019, she made her A1 League debut with Il Bisonte Firenze, then she spent several years in the A2 League, getting an A1 promotion in 2023 with Trentino Volley.

In 2025, Meli returned to the A1 league with Volley Bergamo. In 2026, she made her debut with the Italian team at the Nations League; Italy went on to win the bronze, with Meli scoring 7 points in the 3rd-4th place final. She was later selected to be part of the Italian roster at the 2026 Women's European Volleyball Championship.
