= Indre Sorokaite =

Italian volleyball player (born 1988)

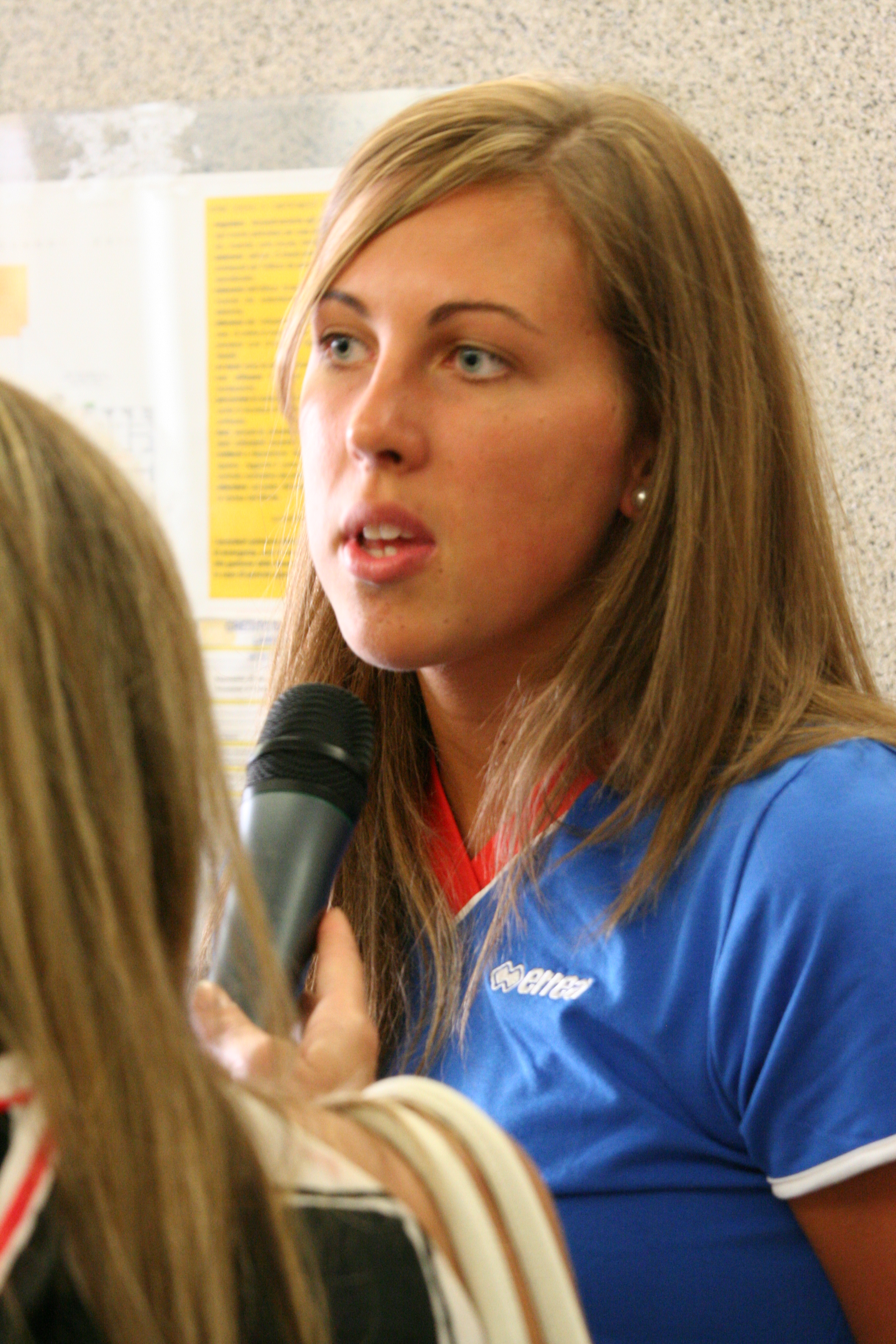

Personal information
- Nationality: Italian
- Born: 2 July 1988 (age 38); Kaunas, Lithuania
- Height: 1.83 m (6 ft 0 in)

Volleyball information
- Position: Opposite, Outside Hitter

Career
Years	Teams
2003–2004	Montesilvano
2004–2006	Castelfidardo
2006–2009	Bergamo
2009–2012	Chieri Torino
2012–2013	Azerrail Baku
2013–2014	Denso Airybees
2014–2016	River
2016–2019	Il Bisonte Firenze
2019–2020	Imoco Volley
2020–2021	Toyota Queenseis
2021–2022	Il Bisonte Firenze
2022–2023	Savino del Bene Scandicci
2023–2024	Union Volley Pinerolo
2024	VW Jakarta Elektrik PLN

National team
2013–	Italy
Honours
Women’s volleyball
Representing Italy
European Championship
Bronze medal – third place	2019 Turkey	Team
FIVB World Grand Prix
Silver medal – second place	2017 Nanjing

Indrė Sorokaitė (born 2 July 1988) is a Lithuanian-born Italian volleyball player. She plays for Union Volley Pinerolo and for the Italy women's national volleyball team. She competed at the 2020 Summer Olympics.

== Career ==
She was born in Kaunas, Lithuania, and moved to Italy with her mother at age 14. She started playing volleyball in Italy in 2003. In June 2013 she became an Italian citizen, and made her national team debut a few days later.

She competed at the 2019 Montreux Volley Masters, and 2019 FIVB Volleyball Women's Nations League.

Her younger brother Paulius Sorokas is a professional basketball player.

== Awards ==
=== Clubs ===
- 2006–07 CEV Women's Champions League - Champion, with Volley Bergamo
- 2007-08 Italian Cup (Coppa Italia) - Champion, with Volley Bergamo
- 2008–09 CEV Women's Champions League - Champion, with Volley Bergamo
- 2014 Italian Supercup - Champion, with River Volley
- 2019 Italian Supercup - Champion, with Imoco Volley Conegliano
- 2019 FIVB Volleyball Women's Club World Championship - Champion, with Imoco Volley Conegliano
- 2019-20 Italian Cup (Coppa Italia) - Champion, with Imoco Volley Conegliano
