= Adhuoljok Malual =

Italian volleyball player (born 2000)

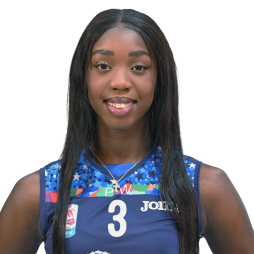
- Adhuoljok Malual

Personal information
- Born: 14 November 2000 (age 26) Rome, Italy
- Height: 193 cm (6 ft 4 in)
- Weight: 72 kg (159 lb)
- Spike: 322 cm (127 in)
- Block: 305 cm (120 in)

Volleyball information
- Position: Opposite
- Current club: Zeren S.K
- Number: 32

Career
- Years: Team
- 2015–2016; 2016–2017; 2017–2019; 2019–2020; 2020–2021; 2021–2023; 2023–2024; 2024–2025; 2025–2026; 2026; 2026-: Assicuritas Argentario Trento B2C; Argentario Progetto VolLei; Club Italia Crai; Green Warriors Sassuolo; Texas Longhorns; VBC Trasporti Pesanti Casalmaggiore; Allianz Vero Volley Milano; Il Bisonte Firenze; Wash4Green Monviso Volley; VakıfBank; Zeren

National team
- Years: Team
- 2018; 2019; 2023–: Italy U19; Italy U20; Italy
Honours
Women's Volleyball
Representing Italy

Adhuoljok Malual (born 14 November 2000) is an Italian volleyball player. She is 1.93 m (6 ft 4 in) tall, and plays in the Outside Hitter position for the Istanbul-based club VakıfBank in the Sultans League and the Italy national team.

== Club career ==
Malual started her career at Argentario Progetto Vollei. She subsequently played for |Club Italia Crai, where she debuted in the Serie A1 of the 2018–19 season, and in the Serie A2-club Green Warriors Sassuolo. During her time in the United States, she was a member of the college volleyball team Texas Longhorns in the NCAA Division I. Returned to Italy, she played for VBC Trasporti Pesanti Casalmaggiore, Allianz Vero Volley Milano, Il Bisonte Firenzee and Wash4Green Monviso Volley.

She then moved to Turkey and signed with the Istanbul-based club VakıfBank. She won the champions titles with her new team at the 2025–26 Turkish League, 2026 Turkish Super Cup, and the 2025–26 CEV Women's Champions League in Istanbul, Turkey.

Ankara based Sports Club, Zeren S.K announced the signing of Malual for the 2026/2027 season.

== International career ==
In 2018, Malual won the CEV U19 Volleyball European Championship in Tirana, Albania with the Italy national U19 team.

She played for the Italy national U21 team, and became silver medalist at the 2019 FIVB U20 World Championship in Mexico.

As a member of the Italy national team, she took part at the 2023 FIVB Nations League in Arlington, Texas, United States. She became champion at the 2025 Summer World University Games in Germany and also at the 2025 FIVB Nations League in Łódź, Poland.

== Personal life ==
Adhuoljok Malual was born to South Sudanese parents Yahya Malual and Mary Agar in Rome, Italy on 14 November 2000. She has two sisters, Mary and Ajak.

She completed her secondary education at Elsa Morante High School in her hometown.

== Honours ==
=== Club ===
VakıfBank

Turkish League
Champions (1): 2025–26

Turkish Super Cup
Winners (1): 2026

CEV Champions League
Champions (1): 2025–26

== International ==
Italy U19

CEV U19 European Championship
Champions (1): 2018

Italy U20

FIVB U21 World Championship
Runerrs-up (1): 2019

Italy

FISU World University Games
Champions (1): 2025

FIVB Nations League
Champions (1): 2025
