= Pallavolo Pinerolo =

Italian women's volleyball team

- Full name: Monviso Volley
- Ground: Pala Bus Company; Pinerolo, Italy (Capacity: 1,500)
- Chairman: Enrico Galleano
- Head coach: Andrea Giovi
- League: FIPAV Women's Serie A2
- Website: Club home page

Uniforms
Home	Away

Pallavolo Pinerolo, also known as Monviso Volley, is an Italian professional women's volleyball club based in Pinerolo. The team currently plays in the Serie A2, Italy's second highest professional league.

== Previous names ==
Due to sponsorship, the club has competed under the following names:

- Bentley Pallavolo Pinerolo (2006–2010)
- Bentley Ford Sara Pinerolo (2010–2012)
- Eurospin Ford Sara Pinerolo (2012–2022)
- Wash4Green Pinerolo (2022–2025)
- Wash4Green Monviso Volley (2025–present)

== History ==
After playing in the fourth tier level of the Italian league, Serie B2, for several years, Pallavolo Pinerolo won the Serie B2 playoff final in 2012 and was promoted to Serie B1. There, Pallovolo Pinerolo played for six seasons until the club was promoted to Serie A2 in 2018 by winning pool A in the 2017–2018 season of Serie B1.

In the 2021–2022 season of Serie A2, the club finished the regular season in pool B in first place and was qualified for the playoff finals. In the finals, Pallavolo Pinerolo defeated Volley Millenium Brescia by three matches to one and for the first time in the club's history it was promoted to Serie A1.

In the 2023–2024 season of Serie A1, Pallavolo Pinerolo finished the regular season in sixth place and made its debut in the championship playoffs. In April 2025, the club changed its brand name from Union Volley Pinerolo to Monviso Volley. In the 2025–2026 season of Serie A1, Monviso finished in 13h place and was relegated to Serie A2.

== Team ==
2026–2027 Team
Number	Player	Position	Height (m)	Birth date
1	(Italy) Francesca Bosso	Outside Hitter	1.85	29 July 2002 (age 24)
2	(Italy) Nicole Modesti	Middle Blocker	1.88	16 March 2004 (age 22)
3	(Italy) Ludovica Mennecozzi	Setter	1.78	5 October 2003 (age 23)
5	(Italy) Bianca Bucciarelli	Outside Hitter	1.85	2 June 2001 (age 25)
6	(Italy) Giulia De Nardi (Note: Giulia De Nardi joined the team on 10 October 2026.)	Libero	1.71	23 April 1994 (age 32)
7	(Italy) Manuela Ribechi	Libero	1.72	15 February 2004 (age 22)
8	(United States) Alyssa Enneking	Outside Hitter	1.84	8 December 1997 (age 28)
9	(Italy) Sveva Parini	Middle Blocker	1.85	3 March 2001 (age 25)
10	(Italy) Alice Farina	Middle Blocker	1.89	26 June 2000 (age 26)
11	(Italy) Emma Bonansea	Libero	1.70	22 July 2006 (age 20)
13	(Italy) Aurora Pistolesi	Outside Hitter	1.82	3 June 1999 (age 27)
17	(Italy) Maria Irene Ricci	Setter	1.81	17 February 1996 (age 30)
23	(Latvia) Irbe Lazda	Opposite	1.90	4 March 2001 (age 25)
24	(Italy) Olimpia Cicogna	Opposite	1.85	2 November 1997 (age 28)

2025–2026 Team
Number	Player	Position	Height (m)	Birth date
1	(Italy) Ulrike Bridi	Setter	1.82	24 July 1998 (age 28)
2	(United States) Anna Dodson	Middle Blocker	1.96	7 May 2001 (age 25)
~~3~~	(Italy) ~~Adhuoljok Malual~~ (Note: Adhuoljok Malual left the team on 12 January 2026.)	~~Opposite~~	~~1.90~~	~~14 November 2000 (age 25)~~
5	(Slovenia) Mija Šiftar	Outside Hitter	1.89	9 February 2006 (age 20)
6	(Italy) Sofia D'Odorico	Outside Hitter	1.86	6 January 1997 (age 29)
7	(France) Amandha Sylves	Middle Blocker	1.96	29 December 2000 (age 25)
8	(Italy) Silvia Bussoli (c)	Outside Hitter	1.84	22 November 1993 (age 32)
9	(Italy) Ilaria Battistoni	Setter	1.74	22 April 1996 (age 30)
10	(Italy) Ilenia Moro	Libero	1.78	5 February 1999 (age 27)
11	(Germany) Lena Kindermann (Note: Lena Kindermann joined the team on 12 January 2026.)	Opposite	1.90	27 July 1999 (age 27)
12	(United States) Danielle Harbin	Opposite	1.85	2 September 1995 (age 31)
15	(Italy) Rebecca Scialanca	Libero	1.65	29 May 2005 (age 21)
16	(Italy) Elena Rapello	Middle Blocker	1.86	14 July 2008 (age 18)
18	(Italy) Yasmina Akrari	Middle Blocker	1.85	31 August 1993 (age 33)
21	(Belarus) Anna Davyskiba	Outside Hitter	1.88	8 February 2000 (age 26)

2024–2025 Team
Number	Player	Position	Height (m)	Birth date
1	(Italy) Indre Sorokaite	Outside Hitter	1.88	2 July 1988 (age 38)
2	(Italy) Francesca Cosi	Middle Blocker	1.89	27 March 2000 (age 26)
3	(Italy) Carlotta Cambi	Setter	1.76	28 May 1996 (age 30)
4	(Italy) Giada Di Mario	Libero	1.80	4 September 2004 (age 22)
7	(France) Amandha Sylves	Middle Blocker	1.96	29 December 2000 (age 25)
8	(Italy) Silvia Bussoli	Outside Hitter	1.84	22 November 1993 (age 32)
9	(Italy) Sofia D'Odorico	Outside Hitter	1.86	6 January 1997 (age 29)
10	(Italy) Ilenia Moro	Libero	1.78	5 February 1999 (age 27)
12	(Italy) Martina Bracchi	Outside Hitter	1.82	25 April 2002 (age 24)
~~14~~	(France) ~~Léandra Olinga Andela~~ (Note: Léandra Olinga Andela left the team on 16 December 2024.)	~~Middle Blocker~~	~~1.85~~	~~12 August 1997 (age 29)~~
15	(United States) Shea Rubright (Note: Shea Rubright joined the team in January 2025.)	Middle Blocker	1.96	9 January 2001 (age 25)
17	(Poland) Malwina Smarzek	Opposite	1.91	3 June 1996 (age 30)
18	(Italy) Yasmina Akrari (c)	Middle Blocker	1.85	31 August 1993 (age 33)
~~23~~	(Italy) ~~Elena Perinelli~~ (Note: Elena Perinelli left the team on 24 February 2025.)	~~Outside Hitter~~	~~1.81~~	~~27 June 1995 (age 31)~~
24	(Cuba) Thalia Moreno Reyes	Opposite	1.89	10 April 2002 (age 24)
28	(Italy) Giorgia Avenia	Setter	1.80	4 April 1994 (age 32)

2023–2024 Team
Number	Player	Position	Height (m)	Birth date
1	(Italy) Indre Sorokaite	Outside Hitter	1.88	2 July 1988 (age 38)
2	(Italy) Francesca Cosi	Middle Blocker	1.89	27 March 2000 (age 26)
3	(Italy) Carlotta Cambi (c)	Setter	1.76	28 May 1996 (age 30)
4	(Italy) Giada Di Mario	Libero	1.80	4 September 2004 (age 22)
5	(Netherlands) Tessa Polder	Middle Blocker	1.89	10 October 1997 (age 29)
6	(Italy) Sofia D'Odorico	Outside Hitter	1.86	6 January 1997 (age 29)
8	(Italy) Silvia Bussoli	Outside Hitter	1.84	22 November 1993 (age 32)
10	(Italy) Ilenia Moro	Libero	1.78	5 February 1999 (age 27)
11	(Switzerland) Maja Storck	Opposite	1.83	8 October 1998 (age 28)
12	(Italy) Letizia Camera	Setter	1.75	1 October 1992 (age 34)
13	(Hungary) Anett Németh	Opposite	1.88	13 December 1999 (age 26)
15	(Italy) Chiara Mason (Note: Chiara Mason joined the team on 15 January 2024.)	Outside Hitter	1.83	11 July 2000 (age 26)
18	(Italy) Yasmina Akrari	Middle Blocker	1.85	31 August 1993 (age 33)
19	(Romania) Adelina Budăi-Ungureanu	Outside Hitter	1.87	29 July 2000 (age 26)

2022–2023 Team
Number	Player	Position	Height (m)	Birth date
2	(Poland) Martyna Grajber	Outside Hitter	1.80	28 March 1995 (age 31)
~~3~~	(Czech Republic) ~~Veronika Trnková~~ (Note: Veronika Trnková left the team on 31 October 2022.)	~~Middle Blocker~~	~~1.89~~	~~13 October 1995 (age 30)~~
4	(China) Yiwen Miao (Note: Yiwen Miao joined the team in February 2023.)	Opposite	1.87	26 July 2000 (age 26)
5	(Italy) Federica Carletti	Outside Hitter	1.84	14 March 2000 (age 26)
6	(Italy) Michelle Gueli	Libero	1.67	6 August 2003 (age 23)
7	(Italy) Sofia Renieri	Opposite	1.88	24 July 1997 (age 29)
8	(Italy) Silvia Bussoli	Outside Hitter	1.84	22 November 1993 (age 32)
10	(Italy) Ilenia Moro	Libero	1.78	5 February 1999 (age 27)
11	(Italy) Vittoria Prandi	Setter	1.80	4 November 1994 (age 31)
13	(Italy) Valentina Zago (c)	Opposite	1.87	21 February 1990 (age 36)
14	(Italy) Laura Bortoli	Setter	1.80	9 January 1996 (age 30)
15	(United States) Rainelle Jones (Note: Rainelle Jones joined the team in December 2022.)	Middle Blocker	1.91	12 March 2000 (age 26)
17	(Italy) Anna Gray	Middle Blocker	1.87	15 November 1996 (age 29)
18	(Italy) Yasmina Akrari	Middle Blocker	1.85	31 August 1993 (age 33)
19	(Romania) Adelina Budăi-Ungureanu	Outside Hitter	1.87	29 July 2000 (age 26)

2021–2022 Team
Number	Player	Position	Height (m)	Birth date
2	(Italy) Jessica Joly	Outside Hitter	1.80	6 January 2000 (age 26)
4	(Italy) Febe Faure Rolland	Setter	1.82	28 May 2003 (age 23)
5	(Italy) Federica Carletti	Outside Hitter	1.84	14 March 2000 (age 26)
6	(Italy) Michelle Gueli	Libero	1.67	6 August 2003 (age 23)
7	(Italy) Carolina Pecorari	Outside Hitter	1.84	7 January 2003 (age 23)
8	(Italy) Silvia Bussoli	Outside Hitter	1.84	22 November 1993 (age 32)
9	(Italy) Alessia Midriano	Middle Blocker	1.83	6 June 1982 (age 44)
11	(Italy) Vittoria Prandi	Setter	1.80	4 November 1994 (age 31)
12	(Italy) Ylenia Pericati	Libero	1.74	22 March 1994 (age 32)
13	(Italy) Valentina Zago	Opposite	1.87	21 February 1990 (age 36)
14	(Italy) Lavinia Zamboni	Middle Blocker	1.84	23 October 2002 (age 23)
15	(Italy) Elisabetta Tosini	Outside Hitter	1.80	15 June 2000 (age 26)
17	(Italy) Anna Gray	Middle Blocker	1.87	15 November 1996 (age 29)
18	(Italy) Yasmina Akrari	Middle Blocker	1.85	31 August 1993 (age 33)

== Head coaches ==
Period	Head coach
2016–2019	(Italy) Massimo Moglio
2019–2025	(Italy) Michele Marchiaro
2025–2026	(Italy) Giuseppe Nica
2026–	(Italy) Andrea Giovi
