= Azzurra Volley Firenze =

Il Bisonte Firenze
- Full name: Azzurra Volley Firenze
- Founded: 1975
- Ground: Palazzo Wanny, Florence, Italy (Capacity: 3,500)
- Chairman: Elio Sità
- Head coach: Alessandro Orefice
- League: FIPAV Women's Serie A1
- Website: Club home page

Uniforms
Home	Away

Azzurra Volley Firenze is an Italian women's volleyball club based in Florence and currently playing in the Serie A1.

== Previous names ==
Due to sponsorship, the club have competed under the following names:

- Volleyball Arci San Casciano (1975–1986)
- Azzurra Volley San Casciano (1986–2004)
- Il Bisonte Azzurra Volley San Casciano (2004–2013)
- Il Bisonte San Casciano (2013–2014)
- Il Bisonte Firenze (2014–present)

== History ==
Founded in 1975 as Volleyball Arci San Casciano, the club originally focused on youth teams. After becoming Azzurra Volley in 1986, the club start making progress in the lower Italian leagues arriving at Serie B2 and eventually reaching the Serie B1 in 2002. With the team showing good potential, the club search for sponsorship in order to fulfil it. In 2004 with main sponsor found, the club change its name to Il Bisonte Azzurra. In the following years, strong campaigns allow the club to compete for promotion to Serie A2 which was reached in 2012. Two seasons later the club was promoted to Serie A1, as a result, the home venue is changed to the Nelson Mandela Forum in Florence. In February 2022, the club changed its home venue again to the newly built Palazzo Wanny arena.

== Team ==
2026–2027 Team
Number	Player	Position	Height (m)	Birth date
1	(Italy) Nausica Acciarri	Middle Blocker	1.86	25 September 2004 (age 22)
~~2~~	(Italy) ~~Beatrice Negretti~~ (Note: Beatrice Negretti left the team on 26 October 2026.)	~~Libero~~	~~1.70~~	~~16 November 1999 (age 26)~~
3	(Italy) Aneta Zojzi	Outside Hitter	1.86	23 May 2003 (age 23)
5	(Italy) Sofia Valoppi	Libero	1.67	25 July 2003 (age 23)
8	(Argentina) Bianca Cugno	Opposite	1.92	22 April 2003 (age 23)
9	(Italy) Jennifer Boldini (c)	Setter	1.87	6 April 1999 (age 27)
10	(Italy) Federica Piacentini	Middle Blocker	1.93	7 March 2001 (age 25)
11	(Italy) Giulia Fanfani	Libero	1.75	27 August 2007 (age 19)
13	(Slovenia) Nika Milošić	Middle Blocker	1.89	20 June 2005 (age 21)
14	(Italy) Alice Tanase	Outside Hitter	1.83	25 May 2000 (age 26)
16	(Italy) Sara Caruso	Middle Blocker	1.93	5 February 2001 (age 25)
19	(Italy) Beatrice Agrifoglio	Setter	1.78	1 January 1994 (age 32)
22	(United States) Caitlin Baird	Outside Hitter	1.91	1 February 2001 (age 25)
23	(Ukraine) Viktoriia Lokhmanchuk	Opposite	1.94	9 May 2001 (age 25)
24	(Poland) Paulina Damaske	Outside Hitter	1.80	1 June 2001 (age 25)

2025–2026 Team
Number	Player	Position	Height (m)	Birth date
1	(Italy) Nausica Acciarri	Middle Blocker	1.86	25 September 2004 (age 22)
4	(Italy) Rachele Morello	Setter	1.82	7 November 2000 (age 25)
5	(Italy) Sofia Valoppi	Libero	1.67	25 July 2003 (age 23)
6	(Argentina) Bianca Bertolino	Outside Hitter	1.85	4 July 2002 (age 24)
7	(Italy) Agata Zuccarelli	Opposite	1.80	27 February 1995 (age 31)
8	(Italy) Alessandra Colzi	Middle Blocker	1.80	1 May 1997 (age 29)
9	(Italy) Francesca Villani	Outside Hitter	1.87	30 May 1995 (age 31)
10	(Netherlands) Jolien Knollema	Outside Hitter	1.89	5 January 2003 (age 23)
12	(Serbia) Ana Malešević	Middle Blocker	1.94	30 March 2002 (age 24)
13	(Serbia) Vanja Bukilić	Opposite	1.98	13 June 1999 (age 27)
14	(Italy) Alice Tanase	Outside Hitter	1.83	25 May 2000 (age 26)
15	(Turkey) Begüm Kaçmaz	Middle Blocker	1.88	26 April 2007 (age 19)
17	(Italy) Bianca Lapini	Libero	1.83	13 July 2002 (age 24)
19	(Italy) Beatrice Agrifoglio (c)	Setter	1.78	1 January 1994 (age 32)

2024–2025 Team
Number	Player	Position	Height (m)	Birth date
1	(Italy) Nausica Acciarri	Middle Blocker	1.86	25 September 2004 (age 22)
3	(Italy) Adhuoljok Malual	Opposite	1.90	14 November 2000 (age 25)
4	(Croatia) Božana Butigan	Middle Blocker	1.92	19 August 2000 (age 26)
6	(Italy) Giulia Leonardi (c)	Libero	1.65	1 December 1987 (age 38)
7	(Italy) Ilaria Battistoni	Setter	1.74	22 April 1996 (age 30)
9	(Italy) Marina Giacomello	Opposite	1.90	1 April 2004 (age 22)
10	(Italy) Stella Nervini	Outside Hitter	1.84	10 September 2003 (age 23)
~~11~~	(Italy) ~~Giulia Mancini~~ (Note: Giulia Mancini left the team on 17 December 2024.)	~~Middle Blocker~~	~~1.83~~	~~23 May 1998 (age 28)~~
~~13~~	(Italy) ~~Manuela Ribechi~~ (Note: Manuela Ribechi left the team on 17 December 2024.)	~~Libero~~	~~1.72~~	~~15 February 2004 (age 22)~~
16	(Netherlands) Indy Baijens (Note: Indy Baijens joined the team on 17 December 2024.)	Middle Blocker	1.93	4 February 2001 (age 25)
17	(Italy) Bianca Lapini	Outside Hitter	1.83	13 July 2002 (age 24)
18	(Italy) Emma Cagnin	Outside Hitter	1.86	26 June 2002 (age 24)
19	(Italy) Beatrice Agrifoglio	Setter	1.78	1 January 1994 (age 32)
21	(Belarus) Anna Davyskiba	Outside Hitter	1.88	8 February 2000 (age 26)
~~33~~	(Italy) ~~Marta Bechis~~ (Note: Marta Bechis left the team on 1 November 2024.)	~~Setter~~	~~1.80~~	~~4 September 1989 (age 37)~~

2023–2024 Team
Number	Player	Position	Height (m)	Birth date
1	(Italy) Nausica Acciarri	Middle Blocker	1.86	25 September 2004 (age 22)
3	(Italy) Manuela Ribechi	Libero	1.72	15 February 2004 (age 22)
4	(Japan) Mayu Ishikawa	Outside Hitter	1.74	14 May 2000 (age 26)
6	(Italy) Giulia Leonardi (c)	Libero	1.65	1 December 1987 (age 38)
7	(Italy) Ilaria Battistoni	Setter	1.74	22 April 1996 (age 30)
8	(Germany) Lina Alsmeier	Outside Hitter	1.89	29 August 2000 (age 26)
9	(Cuba) Ailama Cesé	Outside Hitter	1.90	29 October 2000 (age 26)
10	(United States) Kendall Kipp (Note: Kendall Kipp joined the team on 8 January 2024.)	Opposite	1.96	12 December 2000 (age 25)
11	(Sweden) Alexandra Lazić	Outside Hitter	1.88	24 September 1994 (age 32)
12	(Italy) Alessia Mazzaro	Middle Blocker	1.85	19 September 1998 (age 28)
13	(Italy) Emma Graziani	Middle Blocker	1.93	16 August 2002 (age 24)
19	(Italy) Beatrice Agrifoglio	Setter	1.78	1 January 1994 (age 32)
24	(Ukraine) Anastasiia Kraiduba	Opposite	1.94	15 April 1995 (age 31)
~~26~~	(United States) ~~Lauren Stivrins~~ (Note: Lauren Stivrins left the team on 23 February 2024.)	~~Middle Blocker~~	~~1.93~~	~~26 May 1998 (age 28)~~

2022–2023 Team
Number	Player	Position	Height (m)	Birth date
1	(United States) Rhamat Alhassan	Middle Blocker	1.95	7 September 1996 (age 30)
2	(France) Amandha Sylves	Middle Blocker	1.96	29 December 2000 (age 25)
~~3~~	(Italy) ~~Carlotta Cambi~~ (Note: Carlotta Cambi left the team on 31 December 2022.)	~~Setter~~	~~1.76~~	~~28 May 1996 (age 30)~~
4	(Belgium) Britt Herbots (c)	Outside Hitter	1.82	24 September 1999 (age 27)
5	(Italy) Silvia Lotti	Outside Hitter	1.88	17 June 1992 (age 34)
6	(Italy) Gaia Guiducci	Setter	1.78	9 March 2002 (age 24)
7	(Belgium) Celine Van Gestel	Outside Hitter	1.83	7 November 1997 (age 28)
9	(Italy) Sara Panetoni	Libero	1.74	6 May 2000 (age 26)
10	(Netherlands) Jolien Knollema	Outside Hitter	1.89	5 January 2003 (age 23)
11	(Italy) Anna Adelusi	Outside Hitter	1.86	10 June 2003 (age 23)
12	(Italy) Terry Ruth Enweonwu	Outside Hitter	1.85	12 May 2000 (age 26)
13	(Italy) Emma Graziani	Middle Blocker	1.93	16 August 2002 (age 24)
15	(Italy) Sylvia Nwakalor	Opposite	1.76	12 August 1999 (age 27)
17	(Italy) Bianca Lapini	Libero	1.83	13 July 2002 (age 24)
18	(Russia) Dayana Kosareva	Outside Hitter	1.86	24 August 1999 (age 27)
23	(Italy) Ofelia Malinov (Note: Ofelia Malinov joined the team on 12 January 2023.)	Setter	1.85	29 February 1996 (age 30)

2021–2022 Team
Number	Player	Position	Height (m)	Birth date
~~1~~	(Italy) ~~Indre Sorokaite~~ (Note: Indre Sorokaite left the team on 17 January 2022.)	~~Outside Hitter~~	~~1.88~~	~~2 July 1988 (age 38)~~
2	(France) Amandha Sylves	Middle Blocker	1.96	29 December 2000 (age 25)
3	(Italy) Carlotta Cambi (c)	Setter	1.76	28 May 1996 (age 30)
5	(Italy) Francesca Bonciani	Setter	1.78	25 May 1992 (age 34)
7	(Belgium) Celine Van Gestel	Outside Hitter	1.83	7 November 1997 (age 28)
9	(Italy) Sara Panetoni	Libero	1.74	6 May 2000 (age 26)
10	(Netherlands) Jolien Knollema	Outside Hitter	1.89	5 January 2003 (age 23)
11	(Netherlands) Yvon Belien	Middle Blocker	1.88	28 December 1993 (age 32)
12	(Italy) Terry Ruth Enweonwu	Outside Hitter	1.85	12 May 2000 (age 26)
13	(Italy) Emma Graziani	Middle Blocker	1.93	16 August 2002 (age 24)
14	(Italy) Maddalena Golfieri	Libero	1.65	9 May 2004 (age 22)
15	(Italy) Sylvia Nwakalor	Opposite	1.76	12 August 1999 (age 27)
17	(Italy) Bianca Lapini	Libero	1.83	13 July 2002 (age 24)
19	(Italy) Astou Diagne	Middle Blocker	1.87	2 April 2001 (age 25)

2020–2021 Team
Number	Player	Position	Height (m)	Birth date
1	(Italy) Terry Ruth Enweonwu	Outside Hitter	1.85	12 May 2000 (age 26)
2	(Italy) Arianna Vittorini	Outside Hitter	1.81	5 September 2002 (age 24)
3	(Italy) Carlotta Cambi (c)	Setter	1.76	28 May 1996 (age 30)
4	(Sweden) Rebecka Lazić	Outside Hitter	1.87	24 September 1994 (age 32)
7	(Belgium) Celine Van Gestel	Outside Hitter	1.83	7 November 1997 (age 28)
8	(Italy) Sara Alberti	Middle Blocker	1.85	3 January 1993 (age 33)
9	(Italy) Sara Panetoni	Libero	1.74	6 May 2000 (age 26)
10	(Japan) Naoko Hashimoto	Setter	1.72	11 July 1984 (age 42)
11	(Netherlands) Yvon Belien	Middle Blocker	1.88	28 December 1993 (age 32)
12	(Italy) Anastasia Guerra	Outside Hitter	1.86	15 October 1996 (age 30)
14	(Italy) Fatim Kone	Middle Blocker	1.82	25 October 2000 (age 26)
15	(Italy) Sylvia Nwakalor	Opposite	1.76	12 August 1999 (age 27)
16	(Italy) Nausica Acciarri	Middle Blocker	1.86	25 September 2004 (age 22)
17	(Italy) Maila Venturi	Libero	1.62	23 October 1996 (age 30)
18	(Canada) Alicia Ogoms (Note: Alicia Ogoms joined the team on 15 January 2021.)	Middle Blocker	1.94	2 April 1994 (age 32)

2019–2020 Team
Number	Player	Position	Height (m)	Birth date
1	(Puerto Rico) Daly Santana	Outside Hitter	1.85	19 February 1995 (age 31)
2	(Italy) Sara Alberti	Middle Blocker	1.85	3 January 1993 (age 33)
4	(Germany) Jana Franziska Poll (Note: Jana Franziska Poll joined the team at the end of January 2020.)	Outside Hitter	1.85	7 May 1988 (age 38)
5	(Italy) Denise Meli	Middle Blocker	1.83	9 April 2001 (age 25)
6	(United States) Mikaela Foecke	Outside Hitter	1.91	22 February 1997 (age 29)
~~7~~	(Italy) ~~Alice Degradi~~ (Note: Alice Degradi left the team on 7 January 2020.)	~~Outside Hitter~~	~~1.81~~	~~10 April 1996 (age 30)~~
9	(Netherlands) Nika Daalderop	Outside Hitter	1.90	29 November 1998 (age 27)
10	(Italy) Giulia De Nardi	Libero	1.71	23 April 1994 (age 32)
12	(Italy) Alice Turco	Setter	1.78	4 February 2000 (age 26)
13	(Italy) Sarah Fahr	Middle Blocker	1.92	12 September 2001 (age 25)
14	(Netherlands) Laura Dijkema (c)	Setter	1.84	18 February 1990 (age 36)
15	(Italy) Sylvia Nwakalor	Opposite	1.76	12 August 1999 (age 27)
17	(Italy) Maila Venturi	Libero	1.62	23 October 1996 (age 30)
19	(Canada) Emily Maglio	Middle Blocker	1.89	13 November 1996 (age 29)

2018–2019 Team
Number	Player	Position	Height (m)	Birth date
1	(Italy) Indre Sorokaite	Outside Hitter	1.88	2 July 1988 (age 38)
2	(Italy) Sara Alberti	Middle Blocker	1.85	3 January 1993 (age 33)
3	(Germany) Louisa Lippmann	Opposite	1.91	23 September 1994 (age 32)
5	(Italy) Francesca Bonciani	Setter	1.78	25 May 1992 (age 34)
6	(Serbia) Tijana Malešević (Note: Tijana Malešević joined the team at the end of January 2019.)	Outside Hitter	1.85	18 March 1991 (age 35)
7	(Italy) Alice Degradi	Outside Hitter	1.81	10 April 1996 (age 30)
8	(Puerto Rico) Daly Santana	Outside Hitter	1.85	19 February 1995 (age 31)
9	(Netherlands) Nika Daalderop	Outside Hitter	1.90	29 November 1998 (age 27)
10	(Italy) Beatrice Parrocchiale	Libero	1.67	26 December 1995 (age 30)
11	(Italy) Sonia Candi	Middle Blocker	1.87	8 November 1993 (age 32)
14	(Netherlands) Laura Dijkema (c)	Setter	1.84	18 February 1990 (age 36)
15	(Serbia) Mina Popović	Middle Blocker	1.87	16 September 1994 (age 32)
17	(Italy) Maila Venturi	Libero	1.62	23 October 1996 (age 30)

2017–2018 Team
Number	Player	Position	Height (m)	Birth date
1	(Italy) Indre Sorokaite	Outside Hitter	1.88	2 July 1988 (age 38)
2	(Italy) Sara Alberti	Middle Blocker	1.85	3 January 1993 (age 33)
~~3~~	(Italy) ~~Marta Bechis~~ (Note: Marta Bechis left the team on 26 January 2018.)	~~Setter~~	~~1.80~~	~~4 September 1989 (age 37)~~
5	(Italy) Francesca Bonciani	Setter	1.78	25 May 1992 (age 34)
7	(United States) Hannah Tapp	Middle Blocker	1.88	21 June 1995 (age 31)
8	(Puerto Rico) Daly Santana	Outside Hitter	1.85	19 February 1995 (age 31)
9	(Italy) Chiara Di Iulio	Outside Hitter	1.85	5 May 1985 (age 41)
10	(Italy) Beatrice Parrocchiale	Libero	1.67	26 December 1995 (age 30)
11	(United States) Chiaka Ogbogu (Note: Chiaka Ogbogu joined the team in January 2018.)	Middle Blocker	1.89	15 April 1995 (age 31)
12	(Italy) Giulia Pietrelli	Outside Hitter	1.77	27 August 1988 (age 38)
14	(Croatia) Ivana Miloš Prokopić	Middle Blocker	1.87	7 March 1986 (age 40)
15	(Serbia) Mina Popović	Middle Blocker	1.87	16 September 1994 (age 32)
16	(Italy) Valentina Tirozzi (c)	Outside Hitter	1.82	26 March 1986 (age 40)
18	(Netherlands) Laura Dijkema (Note: Laura Dijkema joined the team in January 2018.)	Setter	1.84	18 February 1990 (age 36)

2016–2017 Team
Number	Player	Position	Height (m)	Birth date
1	(Italy) Indre Sorokaite	Opposite	1.88	2 July 1988 (age 38)
2	(Italy) Natalia Brussa	Opposite	1.88	13 February 1985 (age 41)
3	(Italy) Marta Bechis	Setter	1.80	4 September 1989 (age 37)
4	(Azerbaijan) Odina Bayramova	Outside Hitter	1.86	25 May 1990 (age 36)
5	(Italy) Maria Chiara Norgini	Libero	1.70	11 September 1998 (age 28)
~~6~~	(Italy) ~~Valeria Rosso~~ (Note: Valeria Rosso left the team on 19 January 2017.)	~~Outside Hitter~~	~~1.82~~	~~24 October 1981 (age 45)~~
7	(Puerto Rico) Stephanie Enright	Outside Hitter	1.79	15 December 1990 (age 35)
8	(Italy) Francesca Bonciani	Setter	1.78	25 May 1992 (age 34)
9	(Italy) Laura Melandri	Middle Blocker	1.86	31 January 1995 (age 31)
10	(Italy) Beatrice Parrocchiale	Libero	1.67	26 December 1995 (age 30)
11	(Italy) Vittoria Repice	Middle Blocker	1.85	1 June 1986 (age 40)
12	(Italy) Giulia Pietrelli	Outside Hitter	1.77	27 August 1988 (age 38)
13	(Italy) Raffaella Calloni	Middle Blocker	1.87	4 May 1983 (age 43)

== Head coaches ==
Period	Head coach
2012–2016	(Italy) Francesca Vannini
2016–2018	(Italy) Marco Bracci
2018–2020	(Italy) Giovanni Caprara
2020–2021	(Italy) Marco Mencarelli
2021–2022	(Italy) Massimo Bellano
2023–2024	(Italy) Carlo Parisi
2024–2025	(Italy) Simone Bendandi
2025–2026	(Italy) Federico Chiavegatti
2026–	(Italy) Alessandro Orefice
