= 2026–27 Italian Women's Volleyball League =

2026–27 Italian Women's Serie A1
- League: Italian Women's Volleyball League
- Sport: Volleyball
- Duration: 3 October 2026 – April 2027
- Teams: 14

Regular Season
- Season champions
- Top scorer

Finals
- Champions
- Runners-up
- Finals MVP

Italian Women's Volleyball League seasons
- ← 2025–26 2027–28 →

The 2026–27 Serie A1 is the 82nd season of the highest professional Italian Women's Volleyball League. The season takes place from October to April and is contested by fourteen teams.

== Format ==
The regular season consists of 26 rounds, where the fourteen participating teams play each other twice (once home and once away). At the completion of the regular season, the eight best teams advance to the championship playoffs, the 9-12th ranked teams advance to the challenge playoffs and the teams finishing 13th and 14th are relegated to Serie A2.

The standings criteria:

- highest number of result points (points awarded for results: 3 points for 3–0 or 3–1 wins, 2 points for 3–2 win, 1 point for 2–3 loss);
- highest number of matches won;
- highest set quotient (the number of total sets won divided by the number of total sets lost);
- highest points quotient (the number of total points scored divided by the number of total points conceded).

== Teams ==
| Club | Venue | Capacity | City/Area | Club locations in Italy (2026–27 season). |
| CBF Balducci HR Macerata | PalaFontescodella | 2,100 | Macerata | Club locations in Italy (2026–27 season). |
| CDA Volley Talmassons FVG | Palasport Latisana | 1,500 | Latisana | Club locations in Italy (2026–27 season). |
| ChorusLife Volley Bergamo | PalaFacchetti | 2,880 | Treviglio | Club locations in Italy (2026–27 season). |
| Granda Volley Cuneo | PalaCastagnaretta | 4,700 | Cuneo | Club locations in Italy (2026–27 season). |
| Igor Gorgonzola Novara | Pala Igor Gorgonzola | 4,000 | Novara | Club locations in Italy (2026–27 season). |
| Il Bisonte Firenze | PalaWanny | 3,500 | Florence | Club locations in Italy (2026–27 season). |
| Laica Cioccolato UYBA | E-Work Arena | 4,490 | Busto Arsizio | Club locations in Italy (2026–27 season). |
| Megabox Ondulati Del Savio Vallefoglia | PalaMegabox | 2,001 | Pesaro | Club locations in Italy (2026–27 season). |
| Numia Vero Volley Milano | Allianz Cloud Arena | 5,309 | Milan | Club locations in Italy (2026–27 season). |
| Omag Consolini Volley 1907 | PalaCervia | 2,000 | Cervia | Club locations in Italy (2026–27 season). |
| Prosecco Doc A.Carraro Imoco Conegliano | PalaVerde | 5,344 | Villorba | Club locations in Italy (2026–27 season). |
| Reale Mutua Fenera Chieri '76 | PalaFenera | 1,506 | Chieri | Club locations in Italy (2026–27 season). |
| Savino Del Bene Scandicci | PalaWanny | 3,500 | Florence | Club locations in Italy (2026–27 season). |
| Valsabbina Millenium Brescia | PalaGeorge | 4,000 | Montichiari | Club locations in Italy (2026–27 season). |

== Regular season ==
=== League table ===
| Pos | Team | Pld | W | L | Pts | SW | SL | SR | SPW | SPL | SPR | Qualification or relegation |
|---|---|---|---|---|---|---|---|---|---|---|---|---|
| 1 | Prosecco Doc A.Carraro Imoco Con. | 10 | 10 | 0 | 30 | 30 | 2 | 15.000 | 794 | 615 | 1.291 | Championship playoffs |
| 2 | Numia Vero Volley Milano | 10 | 9 | 1 | 27 | 28 | 5 | 5.600 | 820 | 621 | 1.320 | Championship playoffs |
| 3 | Reale Mutua Fenera Chieri '76 | 10 | 9 | 1 | 25 | 27 | 7 | 3.857 | 797 | 674 | 1.182 | Championship playoffs |
| 4 | Megabox Ond. Savio Vallefoglia | 10 | 8 | 2 | 23 | 26 | 14 | 1.857 | 891 | 877 | 1.016 | Championship playoffs |
| 5 | Savino Del Bene Scandicci | 10 | 6 | 4 | 20 | 24 | 16 | 1.500 | 910 | 824 | 1.104 | Championship playoffs |
| 6 | ChorusLife Volley Bergamo | 10 | 7 | 3 | 17 | 22 | 18 | 1.222 | 863 | 868 | 0.994 | Championship playoffs |
| 7 | Igor Gorgonzola Novara | 10 | 5 | 5 | 16 | 19 | 19 | 1.000 | 817 | 804 | 1.016 | Championship playoffs |
| 8 | Omag Consolini Volley 1907 | 10 | 4 | 6 | 12 | 16 | 21 | 0.762 | 825 | 840 | 0.982 | Championship playoffs |
| 9 | CDA Volley Talmassons FVG | 10 | 4 | 6 | 12 | 14 | 20 | 0.700 | 747 | 785 | 0.952 | Challenge playoffs |
| 10 | Laica Cioccolato UYBA | 10 | 2 | 8 | 8 | 12 | 26 | 0.462 | 799 | 889 | 0.899 | Challenge playoffs |
| 11 | Il Bisonte Firenze | 10 | 2 | 8 | 7 | 10 | 25 | 0.400 | 755 | 825 | 0.915 | Challenge playoffs |
| 12 | CBF Balducci HR Macerata | 10 | 2 | 8 | 6 | 11 | 26 | 0.423 | 745 | 855 | 0.871 | Challenge playoffs |
| 13 | Granda Volley Cuneo | 10 | 1 | 9 | 4 | 9 | 28 | 0.321 | 741 | 891 | 0.832 | Relegated to Serie A2 |
| 14 | Valsabbina Millenium Brescia | 10 | 1 | 9 | 3 | 8 | 29 | 0.276 | 740 | 876 | 0.845 | Relegated to Serie A2 |

Updated to match(es) played on 22 November 2026. Source: Lega Volley Femminile

=== Results table ===
| Home \ Away | MAC | TAL | BER | CUN | NOV | FIR | BUS | VAL | MIL | SGM | CON | CHI | SCA | BRE |
|---|---|---|---|---|---|---|---|---|---|---|---|---|---|---|
| CBF Balducci HR Macerata | | 1–3 | | 3–1 | | | | 1–3 | 1–3 | | | | 1–3 | |
| CDA Volley Talmassons FVG | | | | 3–1 | 1–3 | 3–0 | | | | | 0–3 | 0–3 | | |
| ChorusLife Volley Bergamo | 3–1 | 3–0 | | 3–2 | | | | | 0–3 | | 1–3 | | 0–3 | |
| Granda Volley Cuneo | | | | | 1–3 | 3–1 | | | 0–3 | | | 0–3 | | |
| Igor Gorgonzola Novara | | | 2–3 | | | | | | | 3–0 | 0–3 | 0–3 | | 3–0 |
| Il Bisonte Firenze | | | | | | | | | | 3–0 | 0–3 | 0–3 | | 2–3 |
| Laica Cioccolato UYBA | | 3–1 | 0–3 | | 2–3 | 1–3 | | 2–3 | | | | | | |
| Megabox Ond. Savio Vallefoglia | | 3–0 | | 3–0 | | 3–1 | | | | 3–1 | | | 3–2 | |
| Numia Vero Volley Milano | | | | | 3–0 | 3–0 | 3–0 | | | 3–0 | 1–3 | | | 3–1 |
| Omag Consolini Volley 1907 | 3–0 | | 2–3 | 3–1 | | | 1–3 | | | | | | 3–2 | |
| Prosecco Doc A.Carraro Imoco Con. | 3–0 | | | 3–0 | | | 3–0 | 3–0 | | | | | | |
| Reale Mutua Fenera Chieri '76 | 3–0 | | | | | | 3–0 | 3–2 | | | 0–3 | | | 3–0 |
| Savino Del Bene Scandicci | | | | | 3–2 | 3–0 | 3–1 | | 0–3 | | | 2–3 | | 3–0 |
| Valsabbina Millenium Brescia | 1–3 | 0–3 | 2–3 | | | | | 1–3 | | 0–3 | | | | |

Updated to match(es) played on 22 November 2026. Source: Lega Volley Femminile
Legend: Blue = left column team win; Red = top row team win.

=== Fixtures and results ===
- All times are local, CEST (UTC+02:00) between 3 October and 24 October 2026 and CET (UTC+01:00) from 25 October 2026.

Round 1

| Date | Time | | Score | | Set 1 | Set 2 | Set 3 | Set 4 | Set 5 | Total | Report |
|---|---|---|---|---|---|---|---|---|---|---|---|
| 3 Oct | 20:30 | Numia Vero Volley Milano | 3–0 | Il Bisonte Firenze | 25–20 | 25–22 | 25–20 | | | 75–62 | Report |
| 4 Oct | 16:00 | Savino Del Bene Scandicci | 2–3 | Reale Mutua Fenera Chieri '76 | 25–22 | 23–25 | 25–22 | 21–25 | 11–15 | 105–109 | Report |
| 4 Oct | 17:00 | Megabox Ond. Savio Vallefoglia | 3–1 | Omag Consolini Volley 1907 | 22–25 | 25–23 | 25–23 | 25–20 | | 97–91 | Report |
| 4 Oct | 17:00 | Laica Cioccolato UYBA | 2–3 | Igor Gorgonzola Novara | 25–22 | 15–25 | 19–25 | 25–22 | 12–15 | 96–109 | Report |
| 4 Oct | 17:00 | ChorusLife Volley Bergamo | 3–1 | CBF Balducci HR Macerata | 25–17 | 25–23 | 16–25 | 25–21 | | 91–86 | Report |
| 4 Oct | 17:00 | Prosecco Doc A.Carraro Imoco Con. | 3–0 | Granda Volley Cuneo | 25–13 | 25–16 | 25–20 | | | 75–49 | Report |
| 4 Oct | 18:00 | Valsabbina Millenium Brescia | 0–3 | CDA Volley Talmassons FVG | 15–25 | 19–25 | 15–25 | | | 49–75 | Report |

Round 2

| Date | Time | | Score | | Set 1 | Set 2 | Set 3 | Set 4 | Set 5 | Total | Report |
|---|---|---|---|---|---|---|---|---|---|---|---|
| 10 Oct | 19:30 | Megabox Ond. Savio Vallefoglia | 3–2 | Savino Del Bene Scandicci | 25–22 | 25–23 | 20–25 | 19–25 | 15–13 | 104–108 | Report |
| 10 Oct | 20:30 | Prosecco Doc A.Carraro Imoco Con. | 3–0 | Laica Cioccolato UYBA | 25–9 | 25–21 | 27–25 | | | 77–55 | Report |
| 11 Oct | 16:00 | CBF Balducci HR Macerata | 1–3 | Numia Vero Volley Milano | 20–25 | 8–25 | 27–25 | 11–25 | | 66–100 | Report |
| 11 Oct | 17:00 | Reale Mutua Fenera Chieri '76 | 3–0 | Valsabbina Millenium Brescia | 25–15 | 25–17 | 25–23 | | | 75–55 | Report |
| 11 Oct | 17:00 | CDA Volley Talmassons FVG | 3–1 | Granda Volley Cuneo | 25–20 | 25–23 | 22–25 | 25–20 | | 97–88 | Report |
| 11 Oct | 17:00 | Il Bisonte Firenze | 3–0 | Omag Consolini Volley 1907 | 25–17 | 25–23 | 25–22 | | | 75–62 | Report |
| 11 Oct | 18:00 | Igor Gorgonzola Novara | 2–3 | ChorusLife Volley Bergamo | 20–25 | 25–21 | 25–21 | 18–25 | 10–15 | 98–107 | Report |

Round 3

| Date | Time | | Score | | Set 1 | Set 2 | Set 3 | Set 4 | Set 5 | Total | Report |
|---|---|---|---|---|---|---|---|---|---|---|---|
| 16 Oct | 20:00 | Valsabbina Millenium Brescia | 1–3 | Megabox Ond. Savio Vallefoglia | 25–20 | 20–25 | 22–25 | 17–25 | | 84–95 | Report |
| 17 Oct | 20:30 | Granda Volley Cuneo | 0–3 | Reale Mutua Fenera Chieri '76 | 13–25 | 13–25 | 21–25 | | | 47–75 | Report |
| 17 Oct | 20:30 | Numia Vero Volley Milano | 3–0 | Igor Gorgonzola Novara | 25–19 | 25–18 | 25–15 | | | 75–52 | Report |
| 18 Oct | 17:00 | Omag Consolini Volley 1907 | 3–0 | CBF Balducci HR Macerata | 25–17 | 25–13 | 25–14 | | | 75–44 | Report |
| 18 Oct | 17:00 | Savino Del Bene Scandicci | 3–0 | Il Bisonte Firenze | 25–9 | 25–21 | 25–23 | | | 75–53 | Report |
| 18 Oct | 17:30 | CDA Volley Talmassons FVG | 0–3 | Prosecco Doc A.Carraro Imoco Con. | 16–25 | 25–27 | 19–25 | | | 60–77 | Report |
| 18 Oct | 18:00 | Laica Cioccolato UYBA | 0–3 | ChorusLife Volley Bergamo | 22–25 | 21–25 | 18–25 | | | 61–75 | Report |

Round 4

| Date | Time | | Score | | Set 1 | Set 2 | Set 3 | Set 4 | Set 5 | Total | Report |
|---|---|---|---|---|---|---|---|---|---|---|---|
| 14 Oct | 20:00 | CBF Balducci HR Macerata | 1–3 | Savino Del Bene Scandicci | 14–25 | 25–21 | 24–26 | 23–25 | | 86–97 | Report |
| 14 Oct | 20:30 | Reale Mutua Fenera Chieri '76 | 0–3 | Prosecco Doc A.Carraro Imoco Con. | 19–25 | 14–25 | 22–25 | | | 55–75 | Report |
| 21 Oct | 20:00 | Laica Cioccolato UYBA | 3–1 | CDA Volley Talmassons FVG | 25–22 | 26–28 | 25–20 | 25–18 | | 101–88 | Report |
| 21 Oct | 20:30 | ChorusLife Volley Bergamo | 0–3 | Numia Vero Volley Milano | 14–25 | 23–25 | 15–25 | | | 52–75 | Report |
| 21 Oct | 20:30 | Megabox Ond. Savio Vallefoglia | 3–0 | Granda Volley Cuneo | 25–22 | 25–17 | 31–29 | | | 81–68 | Report |
| 21 Oct | 20:30 | Igor Gorgonzola Novara | 3–0 | Omag Consolini Volley 1907 | 25–23 | 25–22 | 25–16 | | | 75–61 | Report |
| 21 Oct | 20:30 | Il Bisonte Firenze | 2–3 | Valsabbina Millenium Brescia | 25–23 | 20–25 | 25–21 | 22–25 | 10–15 | 102–109 | Report |

Round 5

| Date | Time | | Score | | Set 1 | Set 2 | Set 3 | Set 4 | Set 5 | Total | Report |
|---|---|---|---|---|---|---|---|---|---|---|---|
| 24 Oct | 16:00 | Numia Vero Volley Milano | 3–0 | Laica Cioccolato UYBA | 25–20 | 25–22 | 25–15 | | | 75–57 | Report |
| 24 Oct | 20:45 | CDA Volley Talmassons FVG | 0–3 | Reale Mutua Fenera Chieri '76 | 18–25 | 20–25 | 23–25 | | | 61–75 | Report |
| 25 Oct | 16:00 | Valsabbina Millenium Brescia | 1–3 | CBF Balducci HR Macerata | 16–25 | 19–25 | 25–20 | 23–25 | | 83–95 | Report |
| 25 Oct | 17:00 | Granda Volley Cuneo | 3–1 | Il Bisonte Firenze | 25–22 | 25–19 | 16–25 | 25–21 | | 91–87 | Report |
| 27 Oct | 20:00 | Omag Consolini Volley 1907 | 2–3 | ChorusLife Volley Bergamo | 21–25 | 22–25 | 25–20 | 25–18 | 20–22 | 113–110 | Report |
| 28 Oct | 20:00 | Prosecco Doc A.Carraro Imoco Con. | 3–0 | Megabox Ond. Savio Vallefoglia | 25–15 | 25–16 | 25–11 | | | 75–42 | Report |
| 28 Oct | 20:30 | Savino Del Bene Scandicci | 3–2 | Igor Gorgonzola Novara | 19–25 | 25–16 | 17–25 | 25–19 | 15–11 | 101–96 | Report |

Round 6

| Date | Time | | Score | | Set 1 | Set 2 | Set 3 | Set 4 | Set 5 | Total | Report |
|---|---|---|---|---|---|---|---|---|---|---|---|
| 31 Oct | 18:00 | CBF Balducci HR Macerata | 3–1 | Granda Volley Cuneo | 25–17 | 19–25 | 25–23 | 25–15 | | 94–80 | Report |
| 31 Oct | 20:30 | Reale Mutua Fenera Chieri '76 | 3–0 | Laica Cioccolato UYBA | 25–20 | 25–22 | 25–22 | | | 75–64 | Report |
| 1 Nov | 16:00 | Il Bisonte Firenze | 0–3 | Prosecco Doc A.Carraro Imoco Con. | 21–25 | 19–25 | 21–25 | | | 61–75 | Report |
| 1 Nov | 17:00 | Numia Vero Volley Milano | 3–0 | Omag Consolini Volley 1907 | 25–22 | 25–16 | 25–11 | | | 75–49 | Report |
| 1 Nov | 17:00 | Megabox Ond. Savio Vallefoglia | 3–0 | CDA Volley Talmassons FVG | 25–20 | 25–22 | 25–23 | | | 75–65 | Report |
| 1 Nov | 18:00 | ChorusLife Volley Bergamo | 0–3 | Savino Del Bene Scandicci | 21–25 | 27–29 | 19–25 | | | 67–79 | Report |
| 2 Nov | 20:40 | Igor Gorgonzola Novara | 3–0 | Valsabbina Millenium Brescia | 25–13 | 25–19 | 25–19 | | | 75–51 | Report |

Round 7

| Date | Time | | Score | | Set 1 | Set 2 | Set 3 | Set 4 | Set 5 | Total | Report |
|---|---|---|---|---|---|---|---|---|---|---|---|
| 6 Nov | 20:30 | CDA Volley Talmassons FVG | 3–0 | Il Bisonte Firenze | 26–24 | 25–20 | 25–22 | | | 76–66 | Report |
| 7 Nov | 19:30 | Reale Mutua Fenera Chieri '76 | 3–2 | Megabox Ond. Savio Vallefoglia | 20–25 | 25–14 | 29–27 | 17–25 | 15–11 | 106–102 | Report |
| 7 Nov | 20:30 | Savino Del Bene Scandicci | 0–3 | Numia Vero Volley Milano | 21–25 | 22–25 | 17–25 | | | 60–75 | Report |
| 8 Nov | 16:00 | Prosecco Doc A.Carraro Imoco Con. | 3–0 | CBF Balducci HR Macerata | 25–20 | 25–22 | 25–21 | | | 75–63 | Report |
| 8 Nov | 17:00 | Omag Consolini Volley 1907 | 1–3 | Laica Cioccolato UYBA | 23–25 | 25–18 | 22–25 | 19–25 | | 89–93 | Report |
| 8 Nov | 17:00 | Granda Volley Cuneo | 1–3 | Igor Gorgonzola Novara | 25–21 | 22–25 | 18–25 | 22–25 | | 87–96 | Report |
| 8 Nov | 18:00 | Valsabbina Millenium Brescia | 2–3 | ChorusLife Volley Bergamo | 25–21 | 21–25 | 17–25 | 25–17 | 8–15 | 96–103 | Report |

Round 8

| Date | Time | | Score | | Set 1 | Set 2 | Set 3 | Set 4 | Set 5 | Total | Report |
|---|---|---|---|---|---|---|---|---|---|---|---|
| 11 Nov | 20:00 | CBF Balducci HR Macerata | 1–3 | CDA Volley Talmassons FVG | 18–25 | 16–25 | 25–12 | 22–25 | | 81–87 | Report |
| 11 Nov | 20:30 | Il Bisonte Firenze | 0–3 | Reale Mutua Fenera Chieri '76 | 17–25 | 24–26 | 22–25 | | | 63–76 | Report |
| 11 Nov | 20:30 | Numia Vero Volley Milano | 3–1 | Valsabbina Millenium Brescia | 27–25 | 23–25 | 25–18 | 25–20 | | 100–88 | Report |
| 11 Nov | 20:30 | Laica Cioccolato UYBA | 2–3 | Megabox Ond. Savio Vallefoglia | 25–19 | 20–25 | 25–23 | 24–26 | 10–15 | 104–108 | Report |
| 11 Nov | 20:30 | Omag Consolini Volley 1907 | 3–2 | Savino Del Bene Scandicci | 13–25 | 18–25 | 25–22 | 30–28 | 15–13 | 101–113 | Report |
| 11 Nov | 20:30 | Igor Gorgonzola Novara | 0–3 | Prosecco Doc A.Carraro Imoco Con. | 21–25 | 18–25 | 21–25 | | | 60–75 | Report |
| 12 Nov | 20:50 | ChorusLife Volley Bergamo | 3–2 | Granda Volley Cuneo | 25–20 | 23–25 | 20–25 | 25–23 | 15–6 | 108–99 | Report |

Round 9

| Date | Time | | Score | | Set 1 | Set 2 | Set 3 | Set 4 | Set 5 | Total | Report |
|---|---|---|---|---|---|---|---|---|---|---|---|
| 14 Nov | 21:00 | Megabox Ond. Savio Vallefoglia | 3–1 | Il Bisonte Firenze | 25–23 | 25–21 | 20–25 | 25–21 | | 95–90 | Report |
| 15 Nov | 16:00 | CDA Volley Talmassons FVG | 1–3 | Igor Gorgonzola Novara | 19–25 | 25–23 | 18–25 | 13–25 | | 75–98 | Report |
| 15 Nov | 17:00 | Reale Mutua Fenera Chieri '76 | 3–0 | CBF Balducci HR Macerata | 25–21 | 25–13 | 25–10 | | | 75–44 | Report |
| 15 Nov | 17:00 | Savino Del Bene Scandicci | 3–1 | Laica Cioccolato UYBA | 22–25 | 25–23 | 25–13 | 25–16 | | 97–77 | Report |
| 15 Nov | 17:00 | Valsabbina Millenium Brescia | 0–3 | Omag Consolini Volley 1907 | 28–30 | 17–25 | 24–26 | | | 69–81 | Report |
| 15 Nov | 18:00 | Granda Volley Cuneo | 0–3 | Numia Vero Volley Milano | 13–25 | 17–25 | 13–25 | | | 43–75 | Report |
| 15 Nov | 20:00 | ChorusLife Volley Bergamo | 1–3 | Prosecco Doc A.Carraro Imoco Con. | 13–25 | 25–23 | 18–25 | 19–25 | | 75–98 | Report |

Round 10

| Date | Time | | Score | | Set 1 | Set 2 | Set 3 | Set 4 | Set 5 | Total | Report |
|---|---|---|---|---|---|---|---|---|---|---|---|
| 21 Nov | 20:30 | Igor Gorgonzola Novara | 0–3 | Reale Mutua Fenera Chieri '76 | 19–25 | 15–25 | 24–26 | | | 58–76 | Report |
| 22 Nov | 16:00 | Omag Consolini Volley 1907 | 3–1 | Granda Volley Cuneo | 28–26 | 25–27 | 25–20 | 25–16 | | 103–89 | Report |
| 22 Nov | 17:00 | CBF Balducci HR Macerata | 1–3 | Megabox Ond. Savio Vallefoglia | 25–17 | 19–25 | 22–25 | 20–25 | | 86–92 | Report |
| 22 Nov | 17:00 | Laica Cioccolato UYBA | 1–3 | Il Bisonte Firenze | 22–25 | 25–21 | 21–25 | 23–25 | | 91–96 | Report |
| 22 Nov | 17:00 | ChorusLife Volley Bergamo | 3–0 | CDA Volley Talmassons FVG | 25–18 | 25–23 | 25–22 | | | 75–63 | Report |
| 22 Nov | 17:00 | Savino Del Bene Scandicci | 3–0 | Valsabbina Millenium Brescia | 25–18 | 25–19 | 25–19 | | | 75–56 | Report |
| 22 Nov | 18:00 | Numia Vero Volley Milano | 1–3 | Prosecco Doc A.Carraro Imoco Con. | 21–25 | 25–14 | 23–25 | 26–28 | | 95–92 | Report |

Round 11

| Date | Time | | Score | | Set 1 | Set 2 | Set 3 | Set 4 | Set 5 | Total | Report |
|---|---|---|---|---|---|---|---|---|---|---|---|
| 28 Nov | 20:00 | CDA Volley Talmassons FVG | 0–0 | Numia Vero Volley Milano | – | – | – | | | 0–0 | Report |
| 28 Nov | 21:00 | Granda Volley Cuneo | 0–0 | Savino Del Bene Scandicci | – | – | – | | | 0–0 | Report |
| 29 Nov | 17:00 | Igor Gorgonzola Novara | 0–0 | Megabox Ond. Savio Vallefoglia | – | – | – | | | 0–0 | Report |
| 29 Nov | 17:00 | Valsabbina Millenium Brescia | 0–0 | Laica Cioccolato UYBA | – | – | – | | | 0–0 | Report |
| 29 Nov | 17:00 | Prosecco Doc A.Carraro Imoco Con. | 0–0 | Omag Consolini Volley 1907 | – | – | – | | | 0–0 | Report |
| 29 Nov | 17:00 | Il Bisonte Firenze | 0–0 | CBF Balducci HR Macerata | – | – | – | | | 0–0 | Report |
| 29 Nov | 18:00 | Reale Mutua Fenera Chieri '76 | 0–0 | ChorusLife Volley Bergamo | – | – | – | | | 0–0 | Report |

Round 12

| Date | Time | | Score | | Set 1 | Set 2 | Set 3 | Set 4 | Set 5 | Total | Report |
|---|---|---|---|---|---|---|---|---|---|---|---|
| 4 Dec | 20:50 | Granda Volley Cuneo | 0–0 | Valsabbina Millenium Brescia | – | – | – | | | 0–0 | Report |
| 5 Dec | 17:00 | Il Bisonte Firenze | 0–0 | Igor Gorgonzola Novara | – | – | – | | | 0–0 | Report |
| 5 Dec | 21:00 | Omag Consolini Volley 1907 | 0–0 | CDA Volley Talmassons FVG | – | – | – | | | 0–0 | Report |
| 6 Dec | 16:00 | Savino Del Bene Scandicci | 0–0 | Prosecco Doc A.Carraro Imoco Con. | – | – | – | | | 0–0 | Report |
| 6 Dec | 17:00 | Megabox Ond. Savio Vallefoglia | 0–0 | ChorusLife Volley Bergamo | – | – | – | | | 0–0 | Report |
| 6 Dec | 17:00 | Laica Cioccolato UYBA | 0–0 | CBF Balducci HR Macerata | – | – | – | | | 0–0 | Report |
| 6 Dec | 18:00 | Numia Vero Volley Milano | 0–0 | Reale Mutua Fenera Chieri '76 | – | – | – | | | 0–0 | Report |

Round 13

| Date | Time | | Score | | Set 1 | Set 2 | Set 3 | Set 4 | Set 5 | Total | Report |
|---|---|---|---|---|---|---|---|---|---|---|---|
| 9 Dec | 19:30 | Savino Del Bene Scandicci | 0–0 | CDA Volley Talmassons FVG | – | – | – | | | 0–0 | Report |
| 9 Dec | 20:00 | Valsabbina Millenium Brescia | 0–0 | Prosecco Doc A.Carraro Imoco Con. | – | – | – | | | 0–0 | Report |
| 9 Dec | 20:30 | Reale Mutua Fenera Chieri '76 | 0–0 | Omag Consolini Volley 1907 | – | – | – | | | 0–0 | Report |
| 9 Dec | 20:30 | Megabox Ond. Savio Vallefoglia | 0–0 | Numia Vero Volley Milano | – | – | – | | | 0–0 | Report |
| 9 Dec | 20:30 | Laica Cioccolato UYBA | 0–0 | Granda Volley Cuneo | – | – | – | | | 0–0 | Report |
| 9 Dec | 20:30 | ChorusLife Volley Bergamo | 0–0 | Il Bisonte Firenze | – | – | – | | | 0–0 | Report |
| 9 Dec | 20:30 | CBF Balducci HR Macerata | 0–0 | Igor Gorgonzola Novara | – | – | – | | | 0–0 | Report |

Round 14

| Date | Time | | Score | | Set 1 | Set 2 | Set 3 | Set 4 | Set 5 | Total | Report |
|---|---|---|---|---|---|---|---|---|---|---|---|
| 13 Dec | 17:00 | Reale Mutua Fenera Chieri '76 | 0–0 | Savino Del Bene Scandicci | – | – | – | | | 0–0 | Report |
| 13 Dec | 17:00 | Il Bisonte Firenze | 0–0 | Numia Vero Volley Milano | – | – | – | | | 0–0 | Report |
| 13 Dec | 17:00 | Omag Consolini Volley 1907 | 0–0 | Megabox Ond. Savio Vallefoglia | – | – | – | | | 0–0 | Report |
| 13 Dec | 17:00 | Igor Gorgonzola Novara | 0–0 | Laica Cioccolato UYBA | – | – | – | | | 0–0 | Report |
| 13 Dec | 17:00 | CBF Balducci HR Macerata | 0–0 | ChorusLife Volley Bergamo | – | – | – | | | 0–0 | Report |
| 13 Dec | 17:00 | CDA Volley Talmassons FVG | 0–0 | Valsabbina Millenium Brescia | – | – | – | | | 0–0 | Report |
| 20 Jan | 18:30 | Granda Volley Cuneo | 0–0 | Prosecco Doc A.Carraro Imoco Con. | – | – | – | | | 0–0 | Report |

Round 15

| Date | Time | | Score | | Set 1 | Set 2 | Set 3 | Set 4 | Set 5 | Total | Report |
|---|---|---|---|---|---|---|---|---|---|---|---|
| 20 Dec | 17:00 | Valsabbina Millenium Brescia | 0–0 | Reale Mutua Fenera Chieri '76 | – | – | – | | | 0–0 | Report |
| 20 Dec | 17:00 | Numia Vero Volley Milano | 0–0 | CBF Balducci HR Macerata | – | – | – | | | 0–0 | Report |
| 20 Dec | 17:00 | Savino Del Bene Scandicci | 0–0 | Megabox Ond. Savio Vallefoglia | – | – | – | | | 0–0 | Report |
| 20 Dec | 17:00 | Laica Cioccolato UYBA | 0–0 | Prosecco Doc A.Carraro Imoco Con. | – | – | – | | | 0–0 | Report |
| 20 Dec | 17:00 | ChorusLife Volley Bergamo | 0–0 | Igor Gorgonzola Novara | – | – | – | | | 0–0 | Report |
| 20 Dec | 17:00 | Granda Volley Cuneo | 0–0 | CDA Volley Talmassons FVG | – | – | – | | | 0–0 | Report |
| 20 Dec | 17:00 | Omag Consolini Volley 1907 | 0–0 | Il Bisonte Firenze | – | – | – | | | 0–0 | Report |

Round 16

| Date | Time | | Score | | Set 1 | Set 2 | Set 3 | Set 4 | Set 5 | Total | Report |
|---|---|---|---|---|---|---|---|---|---|---|---|
| 26 Dec | 17:00 | Prosecco Doc A.Carraro Imoco Con. | 0–0 | CDA Volley Talmassons FVG | – | – | – | | | 0–0 | Report |
| 26 Dec | 18:00 | Igor Gorgonzola Novara | 0–0 | Numia Vero Volley Milano | – | – | – | | | 0–0 | Report |
| 26 Dec | 20:00 | ChorusLife Volley Bergamo | 0–0 | Laica Cioccolato UYBA | – | – | – | | | 0–0 | Report |
| 27 Dec | 17:00 | Reale Mutua Fenera Chieri '76 | 0–0 | Granda Volley Cuneo | – | – | – | | | 0–0 | Report |
| 27 Dec | 17:00 | Megabox Ond. Savio Vallefoglia | 0–0 | Valsabbina Millenium Brescia | – | – | – | | | 0–0 | Report |
| 27 Dec | 17:00 | CBF Balducci HR Macerata | 0–0 | Omag Consolini Volley 1907 | – | – | – | | | 0–0 | Report |
| 27 Dec | 17:00 | Il Bisonte Firenze | 0–0 | Savino Del Bene Scandicci | – | – | – | | | 0–0 | Report |

Round 17

| Date | Time | | Score | | Set 1 | Set 2 | Set 3 | Set 4 | Set 5 | Total | Report |
|---|---|---|---|---|---|---|---|---|---|---|---|
| 5 Jan | 19:00 | Savino Del Bene Scandicci | 0–0 | CBF Balducci HR Macerata | – | – | – | | | 0–0 | Report |
| 6 Jan | 20:00 | Valsabbina Millenium Brescia | 0–0 | Il Bisonte Firenze | – | – | – | | | 0–0 | Report |
| 6 Jan | 20:30 | Prosecco Doc A.Carraro Imoco Con. | 0–0 | Reale Mutua Fenera Chieri '76 | – | – | – | | | 0–0 | Report |
| 6 Jan | 20:30 | Numia Vero Volley Milano | 0–0 | ChorusLife Volley Bergamo | – | – | – | | | 0–0 | Report |
| 6 Jan | 20:30 | Granda Volley Cuneo | 0–0 | Megabox Ond. Savio Vallefoglia | – | – | – | | | 0–0 | Report |
| 6 Jan | 20:30 | CDA Volley Talmassons FVG | 0–0 | Laica Cioccolato UYBA | – | – | – | | | 0–0 | Report |
| 7 Jan | 20:00 | Omag Consolini Volley 1907 | 0–0 | Igor Gorgonzola Novara | – | – | – | | | 0–0 | Report |

Round 18

| Date | Time | | Score | | Set 1 | Set 2 | Set 3 | Set 4 | Set 5 | Total | Report |
|---|---|---|---|---|---|---|---|---|---|---|---|
| 10 Jan | 17:00 | Reale Mutua Fenera Chieri '76 | 0–0 | CDA Volley Talmassons FVG | – | – | – | | | 0–0 | Report |
| 10 Jan | 17:00 | Laica Cioccolato UYBA | 0–0 | Numia Vero Volley Milano | – | – | – | | | 0–0 | Report |
| 10 Jan | 17:00 | Megabox Ond. Savio Vallefoglia | 0–0 | Prosecco Doc A.Carraro Imoco Con. | – | – | – | | | 0–0 | Report |
| 10 Jan | 17:00 | ChorusLife Volley Bergamo | 0–0 | Omag Consolini Volley 1907 | – | – | – | | | 0–0 | Report |
| 10 Jan | 17:00 | Il Bisonte Firenze | 0–0 | Granda Volley Cuneo | – | – | – | | | 0–0 | Report |
| 10 Jan | 17:00 | CBF Balducci HR Macerata | 0–0 | Valsabbina Millenium Brescia | – | – | – | | | 0–0 | Report |
| 10 Jan | 17:00 | Igor Gorgonzola Novara | 0–0 | Savino Del Bene Scandicci | – | – | – | | | 0–0 | Report |

Round 19

| Date | Time | | Score | | Set 1 | Set 2 | Set 3 | Set 4 | Set 5 | Total | Report |
|---|---|---|---|---|---|---|---|---|---|---|---|
| 17 Jan | 17:00 | Laica Cioccolato UYBA | 0–0 | Reale Mutua Fenera Chieri '76 | – | – | – | | | 0–0 | Report |
| 17 Jan | 17:00 | Omag Consolini Volley 1907 | 0–0 | Numia Vero Volley Milano | – | – | – | | | 0–0 | Report |
| 17 Jan | 17:00 | CDA Volley Talmassons FVG | 0–0 | Megabox Ond. Savio Vallefoglia | – | – | – | | | 0–0 | Report |
| 17 Jan | 17:00 | Savino Del Bene Scandicci | 0–0 | ChorusLife Volley Bergamo | – | – | – | | | 0–0 | Report |
| 17 Jan | 17:00 | Granda Volley Cuneo | 0–0 | CBF Balducci HR Macerata | – | – | – | | | 0–0 | Report |
| 17 Jan | 17:00 | Valsabbina Millenium Brescia | 0–0 | Igor Gorgonzola Novara | – | – | – | | | 0–0 | Report |
| 17 Jan | 17:00 | Prosecco Doc A.Carraro Imoco Con. | 0–0 | Il Bisonte Firenze | – | – | – | | | 0–0 | Report |

Round 20

| Date | Time | | Score | | Set 1 | Set 2 | Set 3 | Set 4 | Set 5 | Total | Report |
|---|---|---|---|---|---|---|---|---|---|---|---|
| 23 Jan | 20:30 | Numia Vero Volley Milano | 0–0 | Savino Del Bene Scandicci | – | – | – | | | 0–0 | Report |
| 24 Jan | 17:00 | Megabox Ond. Savio Vallefoglia | 0–0 | Reale Mutua Fenera Chieri '76 | – | – | – | | | 0–0 | Report |
| 24 Jan | 17:00 | Laica Cioccolato UYBA | 0–0 | Omag Consolini Volley 1907 | – | – | – | | | 0–0 | Report |
| 24 Jan | 17:00 | ChorusLife Volley Bergamo | 0–0 | Valsabbina Millenium Brescia | – | – | – | | | 0–0 | Report |
| 24 Jan | 17:00 | Igor Gorgonzola Novara | 0–0 | Granda Volley Cuneo | – | – | – | | | 0–0 | Report |
| 24 Jan | 17:00 | CBF Balducci HR Macerata | 0–0 | Prosecco Doc A.Carraro Imoco Con. | – | – | – | | | 0–0 | Report |
| 24 Jan | 17:00 | Il Bisonte Firenze | 0–0 | CDA Volley Talmassons FVG | – | – | – | | | 0–0 | Report |

Round 21

| Date | Time | | Score | | Set 1 | Set 2 | Set 3 | Set 4 | Set 5 | Total | Report |
|---|---|---|---|---|---|---|---|---|---|---|---|
| 31 Jan | 17:00 | Reale Mutua Fenera Chieri '76 | 0–0 | Il Bisonte Firenze | – | – | – | | | 0–0 | Report |
| 31 Jan | 17:00 | Valsabbina Millenium Brescia | 0–0 | Numia Vero Volley Milano | – | – | – | | | 0–0 | Report |
| 31 Jan | 17:00 | Megabox Ond. Savio Vallefoglia | 0–0 | Laica Cioccolato UYBA | – | – | – | | | 0–0 | Report |
| 31 Jan | 17:00 | Granda Volley Cuneo | 0–0 | ChorusLife Volley Bergamo | – | – | – | | | 0–0 | Report |
| 31 Jan | 17:00 | Savino Del Bene Scandicci | 0–0 | Omag Consolini Volley 1907 | – | – | – | | | 0–0 | Report |
| 31 Jan | 17:00 | CDA Volley Talmassons FVG | 0–0 | CBF Balducci HR Macerata | – | – | – | | | 0–0 | Report |
| 31 Jan | 17:00 | Prosecco Doc A.Carraro Imoco Con. | 0–0 | Igor Gorgonzola Novara | – | – | – | | | 0–0 | Report |

Round 22

| Date | Time | | Score | | Set 1 | Set 2 | Set 3 | Set 4 | Set 5 | Total | Report |
|---|---|---|---|---|---|---|---|---|---|---|---|
| 7 Feb | 17:00 | CBF Balducci HR Macerata | 0–0 | Reale Mutua Fenera Chieri '76 | – | – | – | | | 0–0 | Report |
| 7 Feb | 17:00 | Numia Vero Volley Milano | 0–0 | Granda Volley Cuneo | – | – | – | | | 0–0 | Report |
| 7 Feb | 17:00 | Il Bisonte Firenze | 0–0 | Megabox Ond. Savio Vallefoglia | – | – | – | | | 0–0 | Report |
| 7 Feb | 17:00 | Laica Cioccolato UYBA | 0–0 | Savino Del Bene Scandicci | – | – | – | | | 0–0 | Report |
| 7 Feb | 17:00 | Prosecco Doc A.Carraro Imoco Con. | 0–0 | ChorusLife Volley Bergamo | – | – | – | | | 0–0 | Report |
| 7 Feb | 17:00 | Omag Consolini Volley 1907 | 0–0 | Valsabbina Millenium Brescia | – | – | – | | | 0–0 | Report |
| 7 Feb | 17:00 | Igor Gorgonzola Novara | 0–0 | CDA Volley Talmassons FVG | – | – | – | | | 0–0 | Report |

Round 23

| Date | Time | | Score | | Set 1 | Set 2 | Set 3 | Set 4 | Set 5 | Total | Report |
|---|---|---|---|---|---|---|---|---|---|---|---|
| 21 Feb | 17:00 | Reale Mutua Fenera Chieri '76 | 0–0 | Igor Gorgonzola Novara | – | – | – | | | 0–0 | Report |
| 21 Feb | 17:00 | Prosecco Doc A.Carraro Imoco Con. | 0–0 | Numia Vero Volley Milano | – | – | – | | | 0–0 | Report |
| 21 Feb | 17:00 | Megabox Ond. Savio Vallefoglia | 0–0 | CBF Balducci HR Macerata | – | – | – | | | 0–0 | Report |
| 21 Feb | 17:00 | Il Bisonte Firenze | 0–0 | Laica Cioccolato UYBA | – | – | – | | | 0–0 | Report |
| 21 Feb | 17:00 | CDA Volley Talmassons FVG | 0–0 | ChorusLife Volley Bergamo | – | – | – | | | 0–0 | Report |
| 21 Feb | 17:00 | Granda Volley Cuneo | 0–0 | Omag Consolini Volley 1907 | – | – | – | | | 0–0 | Report |
| 21 Feb | 17:00 | Valsabbina Millenium Brescia | 0–0 | Savino Del Bene Scandicci | – | – | – | | | 0–0 | Report |

Round 24

| Date | Time | | Score | | Set 1 | Set 2 | Set 3 | Set 4 | Set 5 | Total | Report |
|---|---|---|---|---|---|---|---|---|---|---|---|
| 28 Feb | 17:00 | ChorusLife Volley Bergamo | 0–0 | Reale Mutua Fenera Chieri '76 | – | – | – | | | 0–0 | Report |
| 28 Feb | 17:00 | Numia Vero Volley Milano | 0–0 | CDA Volley Talmassons FVG | – | – | – | | | 0–0 | Report |
| 28 Feb | 17:00 | Megabox Ond. Savio Vallefoglia | 0–0 | Igor Gorgonzola Novara | – | – | – | | | 0–0 | Report |
| 28 Feb | 17:00 | Laica Cioccolato UYBA | 0–0 | Valsabbina Millenium Brescia | – | – | – | | | 0–0 | Report |
| 28 Feb | 17:00 | Savino Del Bene Scandicci | 0–0 | Granda Volley Cuneo | – | – | – | | | 0–0 | Report |
| 28 Feb | 17:00 | Omag Consolini Volley 1907 | 0–0 | Prosecco Doc A.Carraro Imoco Con. | – | – | – | | | 0–0 | Report |
| 28 Feb | 17:00 | CBF Balducci HR Macerata | 0–0 | Il Bisonte Firenze | – | – | – | | | 0–0 | Report |

Round 25

| Date | Time | | Score | | Set 1 | Set 2 | Set 3 | Set 4 | Set 5 | Total | Report |
|---|---|---|---|---|---|---|---|---|---|---|---|
| 7 Mar | 17:00 | Reale Mutua Fenera Chieri '76 | 0–0 | Numia Vero Volley Milano | – | – | – | | | 0–0 | Report |
| 7 Mar | 17:00 | ChorusLife Volley Bergamo | 0–0 | Megabox Ond. Savio Vallefoglia | – | – | – | | | 0–0 | Report |
| 7 Mar | 17:00 | CBF Balducci HR Macerata | 0–0 | Laica Cioccolato UYBA | – | – | – | | | 0–0 | Report |
| 7 Mar | 17:00 | CDA Volley Talmassons FVG | 0–0 | Omag Consolini Volley 1907 | – | – | – | | | 0–0 | Report |
| 7 Mar | 17:00 | Igor Gorgonzola Novara | 0–0 | Il Bisonte Firenze | – | – | – | | | 0–0 | Report |
| 7 Mar | 17:00 | Prosecco Doc A.Carraro Imoco Con. | 0–0 | Savino Del Bene Scandicci | – | – | – | | | 0–0 | Report |
| 8 Mar | 20:00 | Valsabbina Millenium Brescia | 0–0 | Granda Volley Cuneo | – | – | – | | | 0–0 | Report |

Round 26

| Date | Time | | Score | | Set 1 | Set 2 | Set 3 | Set 4 | Set 5 | Total | Report |
|---|---|---|---|---|---|---|---|---|---|---|---|
| 14 Mar | 17:00 | Omag Consolini Volley 1907 | 0–0 | Reale Mutua Fenera Chieri '76 | – | – | – | | | 0–0 | Report |
| 14 Mar | 17:00 | Numia Vero Volley Milano | 0–0 | Megabox Ond. Savio Vallefoglia | – | – | – | | | 0–0 | Report |
| 14 Mar | 17:00 | Granda Volley Cuneo | 0–0 | Laica Cioccolato UYBA | – | – | – | | | 0–0 | Report |
| 14 Mar | 17:00 | Il Bisonte Firenze | 0–0 | ChorusLife Volley Bergamo | – | – | – | | | 0–0 | Report |
| 14 Mar | 17:00 | Igor Gorgonzola Novara | 0–0 | CBF Balducci HR Macerata | – | – | – | | | 0–0 | Report |
| 14 Mar | 17:00 | Prosecco Doc A.Carraro Imoco Con. | 0–0 | Valsabbina Millenium Brescia | – | – | – | | | 0–0 | Report |
| 14 Mar | 17:00 | CDA Volley Talmassons FVG | 0–0 | Savino Del Bene Scandicci | – | – | – | | | 0–0 | Report |

== Championship playoffs ==
- All times are local, CET (UTC+01:00) until 27 March 2026 and CEST (UTC+02:00) from 28 March 2027.
- The losers of the quarterfinals are moved to the Challenge playoffs.

=== Bracket ===
Quarterfinals
1
8
4
5
2
7
3
6

Semifinals

Finals

=== Quarterfinals ===
==== (1) vs. (8) ====
| Date | Time | Score | Set 1 | Set 2 | Set 3 | Set 4 | Set 5 | Total | Report |
|---|---|---|---|---|---|---|---|---|---|
| | | 0–0 | – | – | – | | | 0–0 | |
| | | 0–0 | – | – | – | | | 0–0 | |

==== (2) vs. (7) ====
| Date | Time | Score | Set 1 | Set 2 | Set 3 | Set 4 | Set 5 | Total | Report |
|---|---|---|---|---|---|---|---|---|---|
| | | 0–0 | – | – | – | | | 0–0 | |
| | | 0–0 | – | – | – | | | 0–0 | |

==== (3) vs. (6) ====
| Date | Time | Score | Set 1 | Set 2 | Set 3 | Set 4 | Set 5 | Total | Report |
|---|---|---|---|---|---|---|---|---|---|
| | | 0–0 | – | – | – | | | 0–0 | |
| | | 0–0 | – | – | – | | | 0–0 | |

==== (4) vs. (5) ====
| Date | Time | Score | Set 1 | Set 2 | Set 3 | Set 4 | Set 5 | Total | Report |
|---|---|---|---|---|---|---|---|---|---|
| | | 0–0 | – | – | – | | | 0–0 | |
| | | 0–0 | – | – | – | | | 0–0 | |

=== Semifinals ===
| Date | Time | Score | Set 1 | Set 2 | Set 3 | Set 4 | Set 5 | Total | Report |
|---|---|---|---|---|---|---|---|---|---|
| | | 0–0 | – | – | – | | | 0–0 | |
| | | 0–0 | – | – | – | | | 0–0 | |
| | | 0–0 | – | – | – | | | 0–0 | |

| Date | Time | Score | Set 1 | Set 2 | Set 3 | Set 4 | Set 5 | Total | Report |
|---|---|---|---|---|---|---|---|---|---|
| | | 0–0 | – | – | – | | | 0–0 | |
| | | 0–0 | – | – | – | | | 0–0 | |
| | | 0–0 | – | – | – | | | 0–0 | |

=== Finals ===
| Date | Time | Score | Set 1 | Set 2 | Set 3 | Set 4 | Set 5 | Total | Report |
|---|---|---|---|---|---|---|---|---|---|
| | | 0–0 | – | – | – | | | 0–0 | |
| | | 0–0 | – | – | – | | | 0–0 | |
| | | 0–0 | – | – | – | | | 0–0 | |

== Challenge playoffs ==
- All times are local, CET (UTC+01:00) until 27 March 2026 and CEST (UTC+02:00) from 28 March 2027.

=== First round ===
==== (9) vs. (12) ====
| Date | Time | Score | Set 1 | Set 2 | Set 3 | Set 4 | Set 5 | Total | Report |
|---|---|---|---|---|---|---|---|---|---|
| | | 0–0 | – | – | – | | | 0–0 | |
| | | 0–0 | – | – | – | | | 0–0 | |

==== (10) vs. (11) ====
| Date | Time | Score | Set 1 | Set 2 | Set 3 | Set 4 | Set 5 | Total | Report |
|---|---|---|---|---|---|---|---|---|---|
| | | 0–0 | – | – | – | | | 0–0 | |
| | | 0–0 | – | – | – | | | 0–0 | |

=== Second round ===
==== Best ranked QF loser vs. (10/11) ====
| Date | Time | Score | Set 1 | Set 2 | Set 3 | Set 4 | Set 5 | Total | Report |
|---|---|---|---|---|---|---|---|---|---|
| | | 0–0 | – | – | – | | | 0–0 | |
| | | 0–0 | – | – | – | | | 0–0 | |

==== 2nd best ranked QF loser vs. (9/12) ====
| Date | Time | Score | Set 1 | Set 2 | Set 3 | Set 4 | Set 5 | Total | Report |
|---|---|---|---|---|---|---|---|---|---|
| | | 0–0 | – | – | – | | | 0–0 | |
| | | 0–0 | – | – | – | | | 0–0 | |

==== 3rd best ranked QF loser vs. 4th best ranked QF loser ====
| Date | Time | Score | Set 1 | Set 2 | Set 3 | Set 4 | Set 5 | Total | Report |
|---|---|---|---|---|---|---|---|---|---|
| | | 0–0 | – | – | – | | | 0–0 | |
| | | 0–0 | – | – | – | | | 0–0 | |

=== Challenge semifinal ===
| Date | Time | Score | Set 1 | Set 2 | Set 3 | Set 4 | Set 5 | Total | Report |
|---|---|---|---|---|---|---|---|---|---|
| | | 0–0 | – | – | – | | | 0–0 | |

=== Challenge final ===
| Date | Time | Score | Set 1 | Set 2 | Set 3 | Set 4 | Set 5 | Total | Report |
|---|---|---|---|---|---|---|---|---|---|
| | | 0–0 | – | – | – | | | 0–0 | |

== Final standings ==
| 1st place, gold medalist(s) |
| 2nd place, silver medalist(s) |

Qualified for 2027–28 CEV Champions League
Qualified for 2027–28 CEV Cup
Qualified for 2027–28 CEV Challenge Cup
