= 2025–26 Italian Women's Volleyball League =

2025–26 Italian Women's Serie A1
- League: Italian Women's Volleyball League
- Sport: Volleyball
- Duration: 6 October 2025 – 22 April 2026
- Teams: 14

Regular Season
- Season champions: Prosecco Doc A.Carraro Imoco Conegliano
- Top scorer: Paola Egonu

Finals
- Champions: Prosecco Doc A.Carraro Imoco Conegliano
- Runners-up: Numia Vero Volley Milano
- Finals MVP: Isabelle Haak

Italian Women's Volleyball League seasons
- ← 2024–25 2026–27 →

The 2025–26 Serie A1 was the 81st season of the highest professional Italian Women's Volleyball League. The season took place from October to April and was contested by fourteen teams.

== Format ==
The regular season consists of 26 rounds, where the fourteen participating teams play each other twice (once home and once away). At the completion of the regular season, the eight best teams advance to the championship playoffs, the 9-12th ranked teams advance to the challenge playoffs and the teams finishing 13th and 14th are relegated to Serie A2.

The standings criteria:

- highest number of result points (points awarded for results: 3 points for 3–0 or 3–1 wins, 2 points for 3–2 win, 1 point for 2–3 loss);
- highest number of matches won;
- highest set quotient (the number of total sets won divided by the number of total sets lost);
- highest points quotient (the number of total points scored divided by the number of total points conceded).

== Teams ==
| Club | Venue | Capacity | City/Area | Club locations in Italy (2025–26 season). |
| Bartoccini-Mc Restauri Perugia | PalaBarton | 4,000 | Perugia | Club locations in Italy (2025–26 season). |
| Bergamo | PalaFacchetti | 2,880 | Treviglio | Club locations in Italy (2025–26 season). |
| Cbf Balducci Hr Macerata | PalaFontescodella | 2,100 | Macerata | Club locations in Italy (2025–26 season). |
| Eurotek Laica Uyba | E-Work Arena | 4,490 | Busto Arsizio | Club locations in Italy (2025–26 season). |
| Honda Cuneo Granda Volley | PalaCastagnaretta | 4,700 | Cuneo | Club locations in Italy (2025–26 season). |
| Igor Gorgonzola Novara | Pala Igor Gorgonzola | 4,000 | Novara | Club locations in Italy (2025–26 season). |
| Il Bisonte Firenze | PalaWanny | 3,500 | Florence | Club locations in Italy (2025–26 season). |
| Megabox Ondulati Del Savio Vallefoglia | PalaMegabox | 2,001 | Pesaro | Club locations in Italy (2025–26 season). |
| Numia Vero Volley Milano | Allianz Cloud Arena | 5,309 | Milan | Club locations in Italy (2025–26 season). |
| Omag-Mt San Giovanni in Marignano | PalaCervia | 2,000 | Cervia | Club locations in Italy (2025–26 season). |
| Prosecco Doc A.Carraro Imoco Conegliano | PalaVerde | 5,344 | Villorba | Club locations in Italy (2025–26 season). |
| Reale Mutua Fenera Chieri '76 | PalaFenera | 1,506 | Chieri | Club locations in Italy (2025–26 season). |
| Savino Del Bene Scandicci | PalaWanny | 3,500 | Florence | Club locations in Italy (2025–26 season). |
| Wash4Green Monviso Volley | Pala Bus Company | 1,500 | Pinerolo | Club locations in Italy (2025–26 season). |

== Regular season ==
=== League table ===
| Pos | Team | Pld | W | L | Pts | SW | SL | SR | SPW | SPL | SPR | Qualification or relegation |
|---|---|---|---|---|---|---|---|---|---|---|---|---|
| 1 | Prosecco Doc A.Carraro Imoco Con. | 26 | 25 | 1 | 72 | 76 | 17 | 4.471 | 2275 | 1865 | 1.220 | Championship playoffs |
| 2 | Savino Del Bene Scandicci | 26 | 22 | 4 | 62 | 67 | 24 | 2.792 | 2174 | 1814 | 1.198 | Championship playoffs |
| 3 | Numia Vero Volley Milano | 26 | 20 | 6 | 62 | 68 | 27 | 2.519 | 2275 | 1955 | 1.164 | Championship playoffs |
| 4 | Igor Gorgonzola Novara | 26 | 19 | 7 | 55 | 67 | 39 | 1.718 | 2374 | 2218 | 1.070 | Championship playoffs |
| 5 | Reale Mutua Fenera Chieri '76 | 26 | 18 | 8 | 55 | 62 | 34 | 1.824 | 2214 | 2070 | 1.070 | Championship playoffs |
| 6 | Megabox Ond. Savio Vallefoglia | 26 | 14 | 12 | 40 | 52 | 52 | 1.000 | 2276 | 2291 | 0.993 | Championship playoffs |
| 7 | Bergamo | 26 | 9 | 17 | 34 | 48 | 57 | 0.842 | 2225 | 2301 | 0.967 | Championship playoffs |
| 8 | Eurotek Laica Uyba | 26 | 9 | 17 | 29 | 43 | 57 | 0.754 | 2164 | 2240 | 0.966 | Championship playoffs |
| 9 | Il Bisonte Firenze | 26 | 9 | 17 | 28 | 39 | 60 | 0.650 | 2046 | 2243 | 0.912 | Challenge playoffs |
| 10 | Honda Cuneo Granda Volley | 26 | 9 | 17 | 24 | 34 | 63 | 0.540 | 2048 | 2272 | 0.901 | Challenge playoffs |
| 11 | Omag-Mt San Giovanni in M.no | 26 | 7 | 19 | 24 | 31 | 60 | 0.517 | 1967 | 2125 | 0.926 | Challenge playoffs |
| 12 | Cbf Balducci Hr Macerata | 26 | 8 | 18 | 23 | 35 | 66 | 0.530 | 2120 | 2307 | 0.919 | Challenge playoffs |
| 13 | Wash4Green Monviso Volley | 26 | 7 | 19 | 21 | 39 | 65 | 0.600 | 2182 | 2387 | 0.914 | Relegated to Serie A2 |
| 14 | Bartoccini-Mc Restauri Perugia | 26 | 6 | 20 | 17 | 30 | 70 | 0.429 | 2077 | 2329 | 0.892 | Relegated to Serie A2 |

Source: Lega Volley Femminile

=== Results table ===
| Home \ Away | PER | BER | MAC | BUS | CUN | NOV | FIR | VAL | MIL | SGM | CON | CHI | SCA | PIN |
|---|---|---|---|---|---|---|---|---|---|---|---|---|---|---|
| Bartoccini-Mc Restauri Perugia | | 0–3 | 2–3 | 3–1 | 0–3 | 3–2 | 0–3 | 2–3 | 0–3 | 1–3 | 0–3 | 3–2 | 0–3 | 3–1 |
| Bergamo | 2–3 | | 2–3 | 3–0 | 3–2 | 2–3 | 3–2 | 2–3 | 2–3 | 3–0 | 1–3 | 2–3 | 0–3 | 3–1 |
| Cbf Balducci Hr Macerata | 3–1 | 3–2 | | 0–3 | 2–3 | 0–3 | 2–3 | 1–3 | 0–3 | 3–0 | 0–3 | 1–3 | 0–3 | 0–3 |
| Eurotek Laica Uyba | 3–1 | 3–2 | 1–3 | | 3–0 | 2–3 | 1–3 | 3–0 | 0–3 | 3–1 | 2–3 | 1–3 | 0–3 | 2–3 |
| Honda Cuneo Granda Volley | 2–3 | 1–3 | 3–2 | 0–3 | | 0–3 | 3–2 | 3–2 | 1–3 | 0–3 | 0–3 | 0–3 | 3–0 | 3–1 |
| Igor Gorgonzola Novara | 3–0 | 3–2 | 3–0 | 3–1 | 2–3 | | 3–0 | 3–2 | 3–2 | 3–1 | 0–3 | 3–0 | 2–3 | 3–1 |
| Il Bisonte Firenze | 3–0 | 0–3 | 3–2 | 0–3 | 3–0 | 1–3 | | 1–3 | 0–3 | 3–1 | 0–3 | 1–3 | 0–3 | 2–3 |
| Megabox Ond. Savio Vallefoglia | 3–2 | 3–1 | 3–1 | 3–0 | 3–1 | 1–3 | 2–3 | | 3–1 | 3–0 | 0–3 | 1–3 | 0–3 | 3–2 |
| Numia Vero Volley Milano | 3–0 | 3–0 | 3–0 | 3–1 | 3–0 | 2–3 | 3–1 | 3–1 | | 3–1 | 3–1 | 3–0 | 3–0 | 3–0 |
| Omag-Mt San Giovanni in M.no | 3–1 | 3–1 | 2–3 | 2–3 | 3–0 | 0–3 | 3–0 | 0–3 | 0–3 | | 0–3 | 0–3 | 0–3 | 2–3 |
| Prosecco Doc A.Carraro Imoco Con. | 3–1 | 3–0 | 3–0 | 3–2 | 3–0 | 3–1 | 3–0 | 3–1 | 3–1 | 3–0 | | 3–1 | 3–1 | 3–1 |
| Reale Mutua Fenera Chieri '76 | 3–0 | 3–0 | 3–0 | 3–0 | 3–0 | 3–1 | 3–0 | 3–0 | 3–2 | 3–0 | 2–3 | | 2–3 | 3–1 |
| Savino Del Bene Scandicci | 3–1 | 3–0 | 3–0 | 3–1 | 3–0 | 3–2 | 3–2 | 3–0 | 3–0 | 3–0 | 0–3 | 3–0 | | 3–1 |
| Wash4Green Monviso Volley | 3–0 | 0–3 | 2–3 | 3–1 | 1–3 | 1–3 | 1–3 | 2–3 | 1–3 | 0–3 | 0–3 | 3–1 | 1–3 | |

Source: Lega Volley Femminile
Legend: Blue = left column team win; Red = top row team win.

=== Fixtures and results ===
- All times are local, CEST (UTC+02:00) between 6 October and 25 October 2025 and CET (UTC+01:00) from 26 October 2025.

Round 1

| Date | Time | | Score | | Set 1 | Set 2 | Set 3 | Set 4 | Set 5 | Total | Report |
|---|---|---|---|---|---|---|---|---|---|---|---|
| 6 Oct | 20:30 | Eurotek Laica Uyba | 2–3 | Prosecco Doc A.Carraro Imoco Con. | 25–19 | 25–23 | 19–25 | 15–25 | 9–15 | 93–107 | Report |
| 6 Oct | 20:30 | Wash4Green Monviso Volley | 1–3 | Savino Del Bene Scandicci | 19–25 | 26–24 | 15–25 | 24–26 | | 84–100 | Report |
| 6 Oct | 20:30 | Il Bisonte Firenze | 1–3 | Reale Mutua Fenera Chieri '76 | 13–25 | 15–25 | 25–21 | 15–25 | | 68–96 | Report |
| 6 Oct | 20:30 | Bartoccini-Mc Restauri Perugia | 2–3 | Megabox Ond. Savio Vallefoglia | 26–28 | 26–24 | 25–18 | 18–25 | 13–15 | 108–110 | Report |
| 6 Oct | 20:30 | Numia Vero Volley Milano | 3–0 | Bergamo | 25–19 | 25–20 | 25–23 | | | 75–62 | Report |
| 6 Oct | 20:30 | Omag-Mt San Giovanni in M.no | 0–3 | Igor Gorgonzola Novara | 16–25 | 23–25 | 23–25 | | | 62–75 | Report |
| 6 Oct | 20:30 | Cbf Balducci Hr Macerata | 2–3 | Honda Cuneo Granda Volley | 30–28 | 25–12 | 27–29 | 18–25 | 14–16 | 114–110 | Report |

Round 2

| Date | Time | | Score | | Set 1 | Set 2 | Set 3 | Set 4 | Set 5 | Total | Report |
|---|---|---|---|---|---|---|---|---|---|---|---|
| 11 Oct | 20:30 | Savino Del Bene Scandicci | 3–1 | Bartoccini-Mc Restauri Perugia | 25–20 | 25–18 | 23–25 | 28–26 | | 101–89 | Report |
| 12 Oct | 16:00 | Prosecco Doc A.Carraro Imoco Con. | 3–0 | Honda Cuneo Granda Volley | 25–18 | 25–16 | 26–24 | | | 76–58 | Report |
| 12 Oct | 17:00 | Igor Gorgonzola Novara | 3–1 | Eurotek Laica Uyba | 25–19 | 25–21 | 21–25 | 25–20 | | 96–85 | Report |
| 12 Oct | 17:00 | Cbf Balducci Hr Macerata | 0–3 | Wash4Green Monviso Volley | 18–25 | 16–25 | 17–25 | | | 51–75 | Report |
| 12 Oct | 17:00 | Megabox Ond. Savio Vallefoglia | 2–3 | Il Bisonte Firenze | 11–25 | 25–20 | 20–25 | 26–24 | 11–15 | 93–109 | Report |
| 12 Oct | 17:00 | Bergamo | 3–0 | Omag-Mt San Giovanni in M.no | 25–16 | 25–20 | 25–18 | | | 75–54 | Report |
| 12 Oct | 18:00 | Reale Mutua Fenera Chieri '76 | 3–2 | Numia Vero Volley Milano | 36–34 | 19–25 | 25–23 | 16–25 | 15–12 | 111–119 | Report |

Round 3

| Date | Time | | Score | | Set 1 | Set 2 | Set 3 | Set 4 | Set 5 | Total | Report |
|---|---|---|---|---|---|---|---|---|---|---|---|
| 15 Oct | 19:15 | Igor Gorgonzola Novara | 3–0 | Reale Mutua Fenera Chieri '76 | 25–23 | 26–24 | 25–20 | | | 76–67 | Report |
| 15 Oct | 20:00 | Il Bisonte Firenze | 3–2 | Cbf Balducci Hr Macerata | 20–25 | 18–25 | 25–22 | 25–20 | 15–11 | 103–103 | Report |
| 15 Oct | 20:30 | Eurotek Laica Uyba | 3–2 | Bergamo | 25–19 | 25–21 | 21–25 | 16–25 | 16–14 | 103–104 | Report |
| 15 Oct | 20:30 | Bartoccini-Mc Restauri Perugia | 3–1 | Wash4Green Monviso Volley | 25–17 | 25–19 | 23–25 | 25–20 | | 98–81 | Report |
| 15 Oct | 20:30 | Numia Vero Volley Milano | 3–1 | Megabox Ond. Savio Vallefoglia | 26–24 | 19–25 | 25–21 | 25–16 | | 95–86 | Report |
| 15 Oct | 20:30 | Omag-Mt San Giovanni in M.no | 0–3 | Prosecco Doc A.Carraro Imoco Con. | 12–25 | 19–25 | 16–25 | | | 47–75 | Report |
| 15 Oct | 20:30 | Honda Cuneo Granda Volley | 3–0 | Savino Del Bene Scandicci | 25–19 | 25–10 | 26–24 | | | 76–53 | Report |

Round 4

| Date | Time | | Score | | Set 1 | Set 2 | Set 3 | Set 4 | Set 5 | Total | Report |
|---|---|---|---|---|---|---|---|---|---|---|---|
| 19 Oct | 16:00 | Bergamo | 2–3 | Igor Gorgonzola Novara | 17–25 | 25–19 | 25–18 | 21–25 | 7–15 | 95–102 | Report |
| 19 Oct | 17:00 | Reale Mutua Fenera Chieri '76 | 3–0 | Eurotek Laica Uyba | 28–26 | 25–17 | 25–22 | | | 78–65 | Report |
| 19 Oct | 17:00 | Wash4Green Monviso Volley | 1–3 | Honda Cuneo Granda Volley | 27–29 | 22–25 | 25–14 | 19–25 | | 93–93 | Report |
| 19 Oct | 17:00 | Savino Del Bene Scandicci | 3–2 | Il Bisonte Firenze | 25–20 | 23–25 | 18–25 | 25–16 | 15–9 | 106–95 | Report |
| 19 Oct | 17:00 | Megabox Ond. Savio Vallefoglia | 3–0 | Omag-Mt San Giovanni in M.no | 25–19 | 25–23 | 25–16 | | | 75–58 | Report |
| 19 Oct | 18:00 | Cbf Balducci Hr Macerata | 3–1 | Bartoccini-Mc Restauri Perugia | 25–22 | 25–14 | 20–25 | 25–19 | | 95–80 | Report |
| 5 Nov | 20:30 | Prosecco Doc A.Carraro Imoco Con. | 3–1 | Numia Vero Volley Milano | 25–17 | 23–25 | 25–23 | 25–21 | | 98–86 | Report |

Round 5

| Date | Time | | Score | | Set 1 | Set 2 | Set 3 | Set 4 | Set 5 | Total | Report |
|---|---|---|---|---|---|---|---|---|---|---|---|
| 25 Oct | 19:30 | Honda Cuneo Granda Volley | 2–3 | Bartoccini-Mc Restauri Perugia | 25–27 | 25–23 | 25–16 | 15–25 | 8–15 | 98–106 | Report |
| 25 Oct | 20:30 | Reale Mutua Fenera Chieri '76 | 3–0 | Bergamo | 25–18 | 25–19 | 25–14 | | | 75–51 | Report |
| 25 Oct | 20:30 | Igor Gorgonzola Novara | 0–3 | Prosecco Doc A.Carraro Imoco Con. | 20–25 | 17–25 | 21–25 | | | 58–75 | Report |
| 26 Oct | 15:00 | Omag-Mt San Giovanni in M.no | 0–3 | Savino Del Bene Scandicci | 16–25 | 17–25 | 15–25 | | | 48–75 | Report |
| 26 Oct | 17:00 | Eurotek Laica Uyba | 3–0 | Megabox Ond. Savio Vallefoglia | 25–21 | 25–23 | 25–12 | | | 75–56 | Report |
| 26 Oct | 17:00 | Il Bisonte Firenze | 2–3 | Wash4Green Monviso Volley | 22–25 | 26–24 | 25–22 | 18–25 | 12–15 | 103–111 | Report |
| 26 Oct | 17:00 | Numia Vero Volley Milano | 3–0 | Cbf Balducci Hr Macerata | 25–21 | 29–27 | 25–16 | | | 79–64 | Report |

Round 6

| Date | Time | | Score | | Set 1 | Set 2 | Set 3 | Set 4 | Set 5 | Total | Report |
|---|---|---|---|---|---|---|---|---|---|---|---|
| 29 Oct | 20:00 | Savino Del Bene Scandicci | 3–1 | Eurotek Laica Uyba | 23–25 | 25–11 | 25–16 | 25–20 | | 98–72 | Report |
| 29 Oct | 20:30 | Wash4Green Monviso Volley | 1–3 | Igor Gorgonzola Novara | 25–23 | 17–25 | 16–25 | 21–25 | | 79–98 | Report |
| 29 Oct | 20:30 | Prosecco Doc A.Carraro Imoco Con. | 3–1 | Reale Mutua Fenera Chieri '76 | 23–25 | 25–20 | 25–20 | 27–25 | | 100–90 | Report |
| 29 Oct | 20:30 | Honda Cuneo Granda Volley | 3–2 | Il Bisonte Firenze | 25–15 | 25–23 | 18–25 | 21–25 | 15–13 | 104–101 | Report |
| 29 Oct | 20:30 | Megabox Ond. Savio Vallefoglia | 3–1 | Bergamo | 21–25 | 25–14 | 25–16 | 25–23 | | 96–78 | Report |
| 30 Oct | 20:00 | Bartoccini-Mc Restauri Perugia | 0–3 | Numia Vero Volley Milano | 20–25 | 23–25 | 17–25 | | | 60–75 | Report |
| 30 Oct | 20:30 | Cbf Balducci Hr Macerata | 3–0 | Omag-Mt San Giovanni in M.no | 25–23 | 25–20 | 25–18 | | | 75–61 | Report |

Round 7

| Date | Time | | Score | | Set 1 | Set 2 | Set 3 | Set 4 | Set 5 | Total | Report |
|---|---|---|---|---|---|---|---|---|---|---|---|
| 1 Nov | 20:30 | Bergamo | 1–3 | Prosecco Doc A.Carraro Imoco Con. | 25–20 | 21–25 | 12–25 | 18–25 | | 76–95 | Report |
| 2 Nov | 15:00 | Numia Vero Volley Milano | 3–0 | Wash4Green Monviso Volley | 25–22 | 25–19 | 25–18 | | | 75–59 | Report |
| 2 Nov | 16:00 | Igor Gorgonzola Novara | 2–3 | Savino Del Bene Scandicci | 25–22 | 25–19 | 27–29 | 13–25 | 11–15 | 101–110 | Report |
| 2 Nov | 17:00 | Eurotek Laica Uyba | 1–3 | Cbf Balducci Hr Macerata | 24–26 | 25–13 | 22–25 | 19–25 | | 90–89 | Report |
| 2 Nov | 17:00 | Megabox Ond. Savio Vallefoglia | 1–3 | Reale Mutua Fenera Chieri '76 | 25–19 | 15–25 | 23–25 | 22–25 | | 85–94 | Report |
| 2 Nov | 17:00 | Il Bisonte Firenze | 3–0 | Bartoccini-Mc Restauri Perugia | 25–22 | 25–21 | 25–22 | | | 75–65 | Report |
| 2 Nov | 17:00 | Omag-Mt San Giovanni in M.no | 3–0 | Honda Cuneo Granda Volley | 33–31 | 25–21 | 25–13 | | | 83–65 | Report |

Round 8

| Date | Time | | Score | | Set 1 | Set 2 | Set 3 | Set 4 | Set 5 | Total | Report |
|---|---|---|---|---|---|---|---|---|---|---|---|
| 8 Nov | 20:00 | Reale Mutua Fenera Chieri '76 | 3–0 | Cbf Balducci Hr Macerata | 25–21 | 25–22 | 26–24 | | | 76–67 | Report |
| 8 Nov | 20:45 | Savino Del Bene Scandicci | 3–0 | Bergamo | 25–13 | 32–30 | 25–10 | | | 82–53 | Report |
| 9 Nov | 16:00 | Prosecco Doc A.Carraro Imoco Con. | 3–1 | Megabox Ond. Savio Vallefoglia | 19–25 | 25–14 | 25–23 | 25–17 | | 94–79 | Report |
| 9 Nov | 17:00 | Wash4Green Monviso Volley | 3–1 | Eurotek Laica Uyba | 27–25 | 25–16 | 19–25 | 25–14 | | 96–80 | Report |
| 9 Nov | 17:00 | Bartoccini-Mc Restauri Perugia | 3–2 | Igor Gorgonzola Novara | 14–25 | 25–20 | 29–27 | 20–25 | 19–17 | 107–114 | Report |
| 9 Nov | 17:00 | Honda Cuneo Granda Volley | 1–3 | Numia Vero Volley Milano | 23–25 | 25–21 | 15–25 | 16–25 | | 79–96 | Report |
| 9 Nov | 18:00 | Il Bisonte Firenze | 3–1 | Omag-Mt San Giovanni in M.no | 22–25 | 25–23 | 27–25 | 25–21 | | 99–94 | Report |

Round 9

| Date | Time | | Score | | Set 1 | Set 2 | Set 3 | Set 4 | Set 5 | Total | Report |
|---|---|---|---|---|---|---|---|---|---|---|---|
| 12 Nov | 20:00 | Savino Del Bene Scandicci | 3–0 | Reale Mutua Fenera Chieri '76 | 26–24 | 25–22 | 25–17 | | | 76–63 | Report |
| 12 Nov | 20:00 | Numia Vero Volley Milano | 3–1 | Il Bisonte Firenze | 24–26 | 25–13 | 25–18 | 25–17 | | 99–74 | Report |
| 12 Nov | 20:30 | Eurotek Laica Uyba | 3–0 | Honda Cuneo Granda Volley | 25–22 | 25–19 | 25–22 | | | 75–63 | Report |
| 12 Nov | 20:30 | Omag-Mt San Giovanni in M.no | 2–3 | Wash4Green Monviso Volley | 25–20 | 25–20 | 25–27 | 23–25 | 12–15 | 110–107 | Report |
| 12 Nov | 20:30 | Bergamo | 2–3 | Bartoccini-Mc Restauri Perugia | 25–20 | 25–20 | 25–27 | 22–25 | 12–15 | 109–107 | Report |
| 12 Nov | 20:30 | Igor Gorgonzola Novara | 3–2 | Megabox Ond. Savio Vallefoglia | 25–16 | 25–21 | 20–25 | 16–25 | 15–13 | 101–100 | Report |
| 12 Nov | 20:30 | Cbf Balducci Hr Macerata | 0–3 | Prosecco Doc A.Carraro Imoco Con. | 16–25 | 12–25 | 26–28 | | | 54–78 | Report |

Round 10

| Date | Time | | Score | | Set 1 | Set 2 | Set 3 | Set 4 | Set 5 | Total | Report |
|---|---|---|---|---|---|---|---|---|---|---|---|
| 15 Nov | 20:30 | Numia Vero Volley Milano | 2–3 | Igor Gorgonzola Novara | 20–25 | 25–27 | 25–17 | 25–17 | 11–15 | 106–101 | Report |
| 16 Nov | 16:00 | Prosecco Doc A.Carraro Imoco Con. | 3–1 | Savino Del Bene Scandicci | 25–22 | 23–25 | 25–22 | 25–16 | | 98–85 | Report |
| 16 Nov | 17:00 | Il Bisonte Firenze | 0–3 | Eurotek Laica Uyba | 21–25 | 21–25 | 21–25 | | | 63–75 | Report |
| 16 Nov | 17:00 | Wash4Green Monviso Volley | 0–3 | Bergamo | 23–25 | 15–25 | 16–25 | | | 54–75 | Report |
| 16 Nov | 17:00 | Honda Cuneo Granda Volley | 0–3 | Reale Mutua Fenera Chieri '76 | 20–25 | 22–25 | 22–25 | | | 64–75 | Report |
| 16 Nov | 18:00 | Megabox Ond. Savio Vallefoglia | 3–1 | Cbf Balducci Hr Macerata | 25–21 | 25–27 | 25–22 | 25–19 | | 100–89 | Report |
| 16 Nov | 20:45 | Bartoccini-Mc Restauri Perugia | 1–3 | Omag-Mt San Giovanni in M.no | 22–25 | 23–25 | 25–20 | 21–25 | | 91–95 | Report |

Round 11

| Date | Time | | Score | | Set 1 | Set 2 | Set 3 | Set 4 | Set 5 | Total | Report |
|---|---|---|---|---|---|---|---|---|---|---|---|
| 22 Nov | 19:00 | Igor Gorgonzola Novara | 3–0 | Cbf Balducci Hr Macerata | 25–15 | 25–22 | 25–18 | | | 75–55 | Report |
| 22 Nov | 20:30 | Prosecco Doc A.Carraro Imoco Con. | 3–0 | Il Bisonte Firenze | 25–16 | 25–22 | 25–20 | | | 75–58 | Report |
| 23 Nov | 16:00 | Omag-Mt San Giovanni in M.no | 0–3 | Numia Vero Volley Milano | 16–25 | 18–25 | 27–29 | | | 61–79 | Report |
| 23 Nov | 17:00 | Eurotek Laica Uyba | 3–1 | Bartoccini-Mc Restauri Perugia | 25–21 | 25–15 | 18–25 | 25–9 | | 93–70 | Report |
| 23 Nov | 17:00 | Reale Mutua Fenera Chieri '76 | 3–1 | Wash4Green Monviso Volley | 24–26 | 25–19 | 25–17 | 25–19 | | 99–81 | Report |
| 23 Nov | 17:00 | Savino Del Bene Scandicci | 3–0 | Megabox Ond. Savio Vallefoglia | 25–12 | 25–10 | 25–16 | | | 75–38 | Report |
| 23 Nov | 17:00 | Bergamo | 3–2 | Honda Cuneo Granda Volley | 26–24 | 25–22 | 25–27 | 19–25 | 15–11 | 110–109 | Report |

Round 12

| Date | Time | | Score | | Set 1 | Set 2 | Set 3 | Set 4 | Set 5 | Total | Report |
|---|---|---|---|---|---|---|---|---|---|---|---|
| 29 Nov | 15:30 | Honda Cuneo Granda Volley | 0–3 | Igor Gorgonzola Novara | 14–25 | 23–25 | 14–25 | | | 51–75 | Report |
| 29 Nov | 20:30 | Bartoccini-Mc Restauri Perugia | 0–3 | Prosecco Doc A.Carraro Imoco Con. | 21–25 | 21–25 | 17–25 | | | 59–75 | Report |
| 30 Nov | 15:30 | Wash4Green Monviso Volley | 2–3 | Megabox Ond. Savio Vallefoglia | 22–25 | 25–23 | 25–21 | 23–25 | 12–15 | 107–109 | Report |
| 30 Nov | 17:00 | Numia Vero Volley Milano | 3–1 | Eurotek Laica Uyba | 22–25 | 25–21 | 25–18 | 25–20 | | 97–84 | Report |
| 30 Nov | 17:00 | Omag-Mt San Giovanni in M.no | 0–3 | Reale Mutua Fenera Chieri '76 | 23–25 | 15–25 | 17–25 | | | 55–75 | Report |
| 30 Nov | 17:00 | Il Bisonte Firenze | 0–3 | Bergamo | 20–25 | 20–25 | 22–25 | | | 62–75 | Report |
| 30 Nov | 17:00 | Cbf Balducci Hr Macerata | 0–3 | Savino Del Bene Scandicci | 15–25 | 24–26 | 16–25 | | | 55–76 | Report |

Round 13

| Date | Time | | Score | | Set 1 | Set 2 | Set 3 | Set 4 | Set 5 | Total | Report |
|---|---|---|---|---|---|---|---|---|---|---|---|
| 22 Oct | 20:00 | Wash4Green Monviso Volley | 0–3 | Prosecco Doc A.Carraro Imoco Con. | 10–25 | 21–25 | 19–25 | | | 50–75 | Report |
| 22 Oct | 20:30 | Savino Del Bene Scandicci | 3–0 | Numia Vero Volley Milano | 25–23 | 25–22 | 25–23 | | | 75–68 | Report |
| 6 Dec | 21:00 | Cbf Balducci Hr Macerata | 3–2 | Bergamo | 25–21 | 21–25 | 25–23 | 21–25 | 16–14 | 108–108 | Report |
| 7 Dec | 16:00 | Igor Gorgonzola Novara | 3–0 | Il Bisonte Firenze | 25–21 | 25–17 | 25–16 | | | 75–54 | Report |
| 7 Dec | 17:00 | Eurotek Laica Uyba | 3–1 | Omag-Mt San Giovanni in M.no | 16–25 | 25–15 | 25–16 | 25–18 | | 91–74 | Report |
| 7 Dec | 17:00 | Reale Mutua Fenera Chieri '76 | 3–0 | Bartoccini-Mc Restauri Perugia | 25–22 | 25–14 | 25–15 | | | 75–51 | Report |
| 7 Dec | 17:00 | Megabox Ond. Savio Vallefoglia | 3–1 | Honda Cuneo Granda Volley | 26–24 | 27–25 | 23–25 | 25–18 | | 101–92 | Report |

Round 14

| Date | Time | | Score | | Set 1 | Set 2 | Set 3 | Set 4 | Set 5 | Total | Report |
|---|---|---|---|---|---|---|---|---|---|---|---|
| 19 Nov | 20:00 | Prosecco Doc A.Carraro Imoco Con. | 3–2 | Eurotek Laica Uyba | 25–23 | 28–30 | 25–14 | 25–27 | 15–10 | 118–104 | Report |
| 19 Nov | 20:30 | Savino Del Bene Scandicci | 3–1 | Wash4Green Monviso Volley | 25–10 | 25–18 | 20–25 | 25–22 | | 95–75 | Report |
| 13 Dec | 20:30 | Reale Mutua Fenera Chieri '76 | 3–0 | Il Bisonte Firenze | 25–21 | 25–19 | 25–22 | | | 75–62 | Report |
| 14 Dec | 17:00 | Megabox Ond. Savio Vallefoglia | 3–2 | Bartoccini-Mc Restauri Perugia | 25–20 | 25–16 | 22–25 | 22–25 | 15–11 | 109–97 | Report |
| 14 Dec | 17:00 | Igor Gorgonzola Novara | 3–1 | Omag-Mt San Giovanni in M.no | 23–25 | 25–17 | 25–21 | 25–19 | | 98–82 | Report |
| 14 Dec | 17:00 | Honda Cuneo Granda Volley | 3–2 | Cbf Balducci Hr Macerata | 17–25 | 21–25 | 25–16 | 25–22 | 15–11 | 103–99 | Report |
| 14 Dec | 20:30 | Bergamo | 2–3 | Numia Vero Volley Milano | 15–25 | 25–23 | 26–24 | 21–25 | 12–15 | 99–112 | Report |

Round 15

| Date | Time | | Score | | Set 1 | Set 2 | Set 3 | Set 4 | Set 5 | Total | Report |
|---|---|---|---|---|---|---|---|---|---|---|---|
| 20 Dec | 19:30 | Honda Cuneo Granda Volley | 0–3 | Prosecco Doc A.Carraro Imoco Con. | 20–25 | 10–25 | 22–25 | | | 52–75 | Report |
| 20 Dec | 20:00 | Numia Vero Volley Milano | 3–0 | Reale Mutua Fenera Chieri '76 | 25–17 | 25–15 | 25–15 | | | 75–47 | Report |
| 20 Dec | 20:30 | Eurotek Laica Uyba | 2–3 | Igor Gorgonzola Novara | 25–22 | 25–19 | 18–25 | 21–25 | 11–15 | 100–106 | Report |
| 20 Dec | 20:30 | Wash4Green Monviso Volley | 2–3 | Cbf Balducci Hr Macerata | 22–25 | 13–25 | 25–20 | 25–17 | 8–15 | 93–102 | Report |
| 20 Dec | 20:30 | Bartoccini-Mc Restauri Perugia | 0–3 | Savino Del Bene Scandicci | 15–25 | 19–25 | 15–25 | | | 49–75 | Report |
| 20 Dec | 20:30 | Il Bisonte Firenze | 1–3 | Megabox Ond. Savio Vallefoglia | 18–25 | 25–23 | 18–25 | 23–25 | | 84–98 | Report |
| 20 Dec | 20:30 | Omag-Mt San Giovanni in M.no | 3–1 | Bergamo | 25–21 | 27–29 | 25–20 | 25–18 | | 102–88 | Report |

Round 16

| Date | Time | | Score | | Set 1 | Set 2 | Set 3 | Set 4 | Set 5 | Total | Report |
|---|---|---|---|---|---|---|---|---|---|---|---|
| 23 Dec | 19:30 | Reale Mutua Fenera Chieri '76 | 3–1 | Igor Gorgonzola Novara | 25–23 | 23–25 | 25–12 | 25–21 | | 98–81 | Report |
| 23 Dec | 20:00 | Megabox Ond. Savio Vallefoglia | 3–1 | Numia Vero Volley Milano | 25–21 | 17–25 | 25–23 | 25–15 | | 92–84 | Report |
| 23 Dec | 20:30 | Bergamo | 3–0 | Eurotek Laica Uyba | 25–23 | 25–13 | 25–19 | | | 75–55 | Report |
| 23 Dec | 20:30 | Wash4Green Monviso Volley | 3–0 | Bartoccini-Mc Restauri Perugia | 25–23 | 25–22 | 25–20 | | | 75–65 | Report |
| 23 Dec | 20:30 | Cbf Balducci Hr Macerata | 2–3 | Il Bisonte Firenze | 23–25 | 25–12 | 21–25 | 25–20 | 13–15 | 107–97 | Report |
| 23 Dec | 20:30 | Prosecco Doc A.Carraro Imoco Con. | 3–0 | Omag-Mt San Giovanni in M.no | 25–23 | 25–17 | 25–19 | | | 75–59 | Report |
| 23 Dec | 20:30 | Savino Del Bene Scandicci | 3–0 | Honda Cuneo Granda Volley | 25–15 | 27–25 | 25–13 | | | 77–53 | Report |

Round 17

| Date | Time | | Score | | Set 1 | Set 2 | Set 3 | Set 4 | Set 5 | Total | Report |
|---|---|---|---|---|---|---|---|---|---|---|---|
| 26 Dec | 16:00 | Omag-Mt San Giovanni in M.no | 0–3 | Megabox Ond. Savio Vallefoglia | 19–25 | 20–25 | 26–28 | | | 65–78 | Report |
| 26 Dec | 17:00 | Honda Cuneo Granda Volley | 3–1 | Wash4Green Monviso Volley | 24–26 | 25–19 | 25–15 | 25–23 | | 99–83 | Report |
| 26 Dec | 17:00 | Bartoccini-Mc Restauri Perugia | 2–3 | Cbf Balducci Hr Macerata | 25–22 | 27–29 | 22–25 | 25–18 | 13–15 | 112–109 | Report |
| 26 Dec | 17:00 | Igor Gorgonzola Novara | 3–2 | Bergamo | 25–23 | 23–25 | 18–25 | 25–18 | 15–12 | 106–103 | Report |
| 26 Dec | 18:00 | Eurotek Laica Uyba | 1–3 | Reale Mutua Fenera Chieri '76 | 20–25 | 31–33 | 25–19 | 22–25 | | 98–102 | Report |
| 26 Dec | 18:30 | Il Bisonte Firenze | 0–3 | Savino Del Bene Scandicci | 21–25 | 13–25 | 17–25 | | | 51–75 | Report |
| 27 Dec | 18:00 | Numia Vero Volley Milano | 3–1 | Prosecco Doc A.Carraro Imoco Con. | 22–25 | 25–19 | 31–29 | 25–20 | | 103–93 | Report |

Round 18

| Date | Time | | Score | | Set 1 | Set 2 | Set 3 | Set 4 | Set 5 | Total | Report |
|---|---|---|---|---|---|---|---|---|---|---|---|
| 3 Jan | 18:00 | Cbf Balducci Hr Macerata | 0–3 | Numia Vero Volley Milano | 22–25 | 19–25 | 18–25 | | | 59–75 | Report |
| 3 Jan | 20:30 | Bartoccini-Mc Restauri Perugia | 0–3 | Honda Cuneo Granda Volley | 22–25 | 28–30 | 26–28 | | | 76–83 | Report |
| 4 Jan | 16:00 | Megabox Ond. Savio Vallefoglia | 3–0 | Eurotek Laica Uyba | 29–27 | 26–24 | 25–23 | | | 80–74 | Report |
| 4 Jan | 17:00 | Wash4Green Monviso Volley | 1–3 | Il Bisonte Firenze | 21–25 | 25–20 | 14–25 | 24–26 | | 84–96 | Report |
| 4 Jan | 17:00 | Bergamo | 2–3 | Reale Mutua Fenera Chieri '76 | 25–20 | 22–25 | 25–19 | 24–26 | 10–15 | 106–105 | Report |
| 4 Jan | 17:00 | Savino Del Bene Scandicci | 3–0 | Omag-Mt San Giovanni in M.no | 25–17 | 25–18 | 25–23 | | | 75–58 | Report |
| 4 Jan | 18:00 | Prosecco Doc A.Carraro Imoco Con. | 3–1 | Igor Gorgonzola Novara | 23–25 | 25–13 | 25–18 | 29–27 | | 102–83 | Report |

Round 19

| Date | Time | | Score | | Set 1 | Set 2 | Set 3 | Set 4 | Set 5 | Total | Report |
|---|---|---|---|---|---|---|---|---|---|---|---|
| 10 Dec | 20:00 | Igor Gorgonzola Novara | 3–1 | Wash4Green Monviso Volley | 25–20 | 20–25 | 25–21 | 25–23 | | 95–89 | Report |
| 10 Jan | 21:00 | Omag-Mt San Giovanni in M.no | 2–3 | Cbf Balducci Hr Macerata | 22–25 | 25–22 | 25–18 | 23–25 | 17–19 | 112–109 | Report |
| 11 Jan | 16:00 | Reale Mutua Fenera Chieri '76 | 2–3 | Prosecco Doc A.Carraro Imoco Con. | 25–22 | 21–25 | 25–17 | 18–25 | 12–15 | 101–104 | Report |
| 11 Jan | 17:00 | Eurotek Laica Uyba | 0–3 | Savino Del Bene Scandicci | 18–25 | 15–25 | 19–25 | | | 52–75 | Report |
| 11 Jan | 17:00 | Numia Vero Volley Milano | 3–0 | Bartoccini-Mc Restauri Perugia | 25–18 | 25–19 | 25–19 | | | 75–56 | Report |
| 11 Jan | 17:00 | Il Bisonte Firenze | 3–0 | Honda Cuneo Granda Volley | 25–21 | 25–23 | 25–19 | | | 75–63 | Report |
| 11 Jan | 17:00 | Bergamo | 2–3 | Megabox Ond. Savio Vallefoglia | 25–21 | 25–18 | 12–25 | 24–26 | 12–15 | 98–105 | Report |

Round 20

| Date | Time | | Score | | Set 1 | Set 2 | Set 3 | Set 4 | Set 5 | Total | Report |
|---|---|---|---|---|---|---|---|---|---|---|---|
| 17 Jan | 19:30 | Honda Cuneo Granda Volley | 0–3 | Omag-Mt San Giovanni in M.no | 17–25 | 30–32 | 13–25 | | | 60–82 | Report |
| 17 Jan | 20:00 | Savino Del Bene Scandicci | 3–2 | Igor Gorgonzola Novara | 25–17 | 25–20 | 19–25 | 24–26 | 15–11 | 108–99 | Report |
| 17 Jan | 20:30 | Cbf Balducci Hr Macerata | 0–3 | Eurotek Laica Uyba | 19–25 | 21–25 | 16–25 | | | 56–75 | Report |
| 17 Jan | 20:30 | Wash4Green Monviso Volley | 1–3 | Numia Vero Volley Milano | 25–23 | 19–25 | 21–25 | 12–25 | | 77–98 | Report |
| 17 Jan | 20:30 | Reale Mutua Fenera Chieri '76 | 3–0 | Megabox Ond. Savio Vallefoglia | 27–25 | 25–19 | 25–22 | | | 77–66 | Report |
| 17 Jan | 20:30 | Bartoccini-Mc Restauri Perugia | 0–3 | Il Bisonte Firenze | 17–25 | 19–25 | 18–25 | | | 54–75 | Report |
| 17 Jan | 20:30 | Prosecco Doc A.Carraro Imoco Con. | 3–0 | Bergamo | 25–20 | 25–23 | 25–15 | | | 75–58 | Report |

Round 21

| Date | Time | | Score | | Set 1 | Set 2 | Set 3 | Set 4 | Set 5 | Total | Report |
|---|---|---|---|---|---|---|---|---|---|---|---|
| 20 Jan | 19:30 | Omag-Mt San Giovanni in M.no | 3–0 | Il Bisonte Firenze | 25–21 | 25–19 | 25–18 | | | 75–58 | Report |
| 20 Jan | 20:00 | Cbf Balducci Hr Macerata | 1–3 | Reale Mutua Fenera Chieri '76 | 26–24 | 22–25 | 23–25 | 23–25 | | 94–99 | Report |
| 20 Jan | 20:30 | Eurotek Laica Uyba | 2–3 | Wash4Green Monviso Volley | 25–17 | 26–28 | 25–22 | 19–25 | 11–15 | 106–107 | Report |
| 20 Jan | 20:30 | Igor Gorgonzola Novara | 3–0 | Bartoccini-Mc Restauri Perugia | 25–17 | 25–13 | 25–20 | | | 75–50 | Report |
| 20 Jan | 20:30 | Numia Vero Volley Milano | 3–0 | Honda Cuneo Granda Volley | 25–16 | 25–17 | 29–27 | | | 79–60 | Report |
| 20 Jan | 20:30 | Bergamo | 0–3 | Savino Del Bene Scandicci | 18–25 | 23–25 | 13–25 | | | 54–75 | Report |
| 20 Jan | 20:30 | Megabox Ond. Savio Vallefoglia | 0–3 | Prosecco Doc A.Carraro Imoco Con. | 22–25 | 19–25 | 23–25 | | | 64–75 | Report |

Round 22

| Date | Time | | Score | | Set 1 | Set 2 | Set 3 | Set 4 | Set 5 | Total | Report |
|---|---|---|---|---|---|---|---|---|---|---|---|
| 31 Jan | 20:30 | Honda Cuneo Granda Volley | 0–3 | Eurotek Laica Uyba | 10–25 | 18–25 | 21–25 | | | 49–75 | Report |
| 1 Feb | 16:00 | Wash4Green Monviso Volley | 0–3 | Omag-Mt San Giovanni in M.no | 18–25 | 17–25 | 20–25 | | | 55–75 | Report |
| 1 Feb | 17:00 | Reale Mutua Fenera Chieri '76 | 2–3 | Savino Del Bene Scandicci | 27–25 | 18–25 | 25–21 | 20–25 | 13–15 | 103–111 | Report |
| 1 Feb | 17:00 | Bartoccini-Mc Restauri Perugia | 0–3 | Bergamo | 18–25 | 19–25 | 22–25 | | | 59–75 | Report |
| 1 Feb | 17:00 | Il Bisonte Firenze | 0–3 | Numia Vero Volley Milano | 13–25 | 20–25 | 15–25 | | | 48–75 | Report |
| 1 Feb | 17:00 | Prosecco Doc A.Carraro Imoco Con. | 3–0 | Cbf Balducci Hr Macerata | 25–20 | 25–16 | 25–15 | | | 75–51 | Report |
| 1 Feb | 18:00 | Megabox Ond. Savio Vallefoglia | 1–3 | Igor Gorgonzola Novara | 11–25 | 25–17 | 23–25 | 21–25 | | 80–92 | Report |

Round 23

| Date | Time | | Score | | Set 1 | Set 2 | Set 3 | Set 4 | Set 5 | Total | Report |
|---|---|---|---|---|---|---|---|---|---|---|---|
| 7 Feb | 19:00 | Bergamo | 3–1 | Wash4Green Monviso Volley | 25–19 | 18–25 | 25–20 | 25–19 | | 93–83 | Report |
| 7 Feb | 21:00 | Omag-Mt San Giovanni in M.no | 3–1 | Bartoccini-Mc Restauri Perugia | 22–25 | 25–18 | 25–20 | 29–27 | | 101–90 | Report |
| 8 Feb | 16:00 | Igor Gorgonzola Novara | 3–2 | Numia Vero Volley Milano | 25–18 | 19–25 | 25–20 | 22–25 | 16–14 | 107–102 | Report |
| 8 Feb | 17:00 | Eurotek Laica Uyba | 1–3 | Il Bisonte Firenze | 25–22 | 23–25 | 22–25 | 22–25 | | 92–97 | Report |
| 8 Feb | 17:00 | Reale Mutua Fenera Chieri '76 | 3–0 | Honda Cuneo Granda Volley | 25–19 | 26–24 | 27–25 | | | 78–68 | Report |
| 8 Feb | 17:00 | Savino Del Bene Scandicci | 0–3 | Prosecco Doc A.Carraro Imoco Con. | 41–43 | 22–25 | 20–25 | | | 83–93 | Report |
| 8 Feb | 17:00 | Cbf Balducci Hr Macerata | 1–3 | Megabox Ond. Savio Vallefoglia | 20–25 | 25–23 | 21–25 | 20–25 | | 86–98 | Report |

Round 24

| Date | Time | | Score | | Set 1 | Set 2 | Set 3 | Set 4 | Set 5 | Total | Report |
|---|---|---|---|---|---|---|---|---|---|---|---|
| 10 Feb | 19:00 | Il Bisonte Firenze | 0–3 | Prosecco Doc A.Carraro Imoco Con. | 17–25 | 16–25 | 18–25 | | | 51–75 | Report |
| 11 Feb | 19:30 | Honda Cuneo Granda Volley | 1–3 | Bergamo | 26–24 | 24–26 | 21–25 | 22–25 | | 93–100 | Report |
| 11 Feb | 20:00 | Bartoccini-Mc Restauri Perugia | 3–1 | Eurotek Laica Uyba | 26–24 | 25–22 | 22–25 | 25–21 | | 98–92 | Report |
| 11 Feb | 20:00 | Numia Vero Volley Milano | 3–1 | Omag-Mt San Giovanni in M.no | 25–21 | 23–25 | 25–22 | 25–21 | | 98–89 | Report |
| 11 Feb | 20:30 | Wash4Green Monviso Volley | 3–1 | Reale Mutua Fenera Chieri '76 | 25–18 | 25–22 | 22–25 | 25–23 | | 97–88 | Report |
| 11 Feb | 20:30 | Megabox Ond. Savio Vallefoglia | 0–3 | Savino Del Bene Scandicci | 23–25 | 18–25 | 19–25 | | | 60–75 | Report |
| 11 Feb | 20:30 | Cbf Balducci Hr Macerata | 0–3 | Igor Gorgonzola Novara | 22–25 | 31–33 | 16–25 | | | 69–83 | Report |

Round 25

| Date | Time | | Score | | Set 1 | Set 2 | Set 3 | Set 4 | Set 5 | Total | Report |
|---|---|---|---|---|---|---|---|---|---|---|---|
| 14 Feb | 20:30 | Eurotek Laica Uyba | 0–3 | Numia Vero Volley Milano | 17–25 | 20–25 | 14–25 | | | 51–75 | Report |
| 15 Feb | 16:00 | Prosecco Doc A.Carraro Imoco Con. | 3–1 | Bartoccini-Mc Restauri Perugia | 25–18 | 21–25 | 25–17 | 26–24 | | 97–84 | Report |
| 15 Feb | 17:00 | Megabox Ond. Savio Vallefoglia | 3–2 | Wash4Green Monviso Volley | 25–23 | 23–25 | 23–25 | 26–24 | 15–11 | 112–108 | Report |
| 15 Feb | 17:00 | Reale Mutua Fenera Chieri '76 | 3–0 | Omag-Mt San Giovanni in M.no | 25–13 | 25–18 | 25–23 | | | 75–54 | Report |
| 15 Feb | 17:00 | Bergamo | 3–2 | Il Bisonte Firenze | 17–25 | 24–26 | 25–18 | 25–21 | 15–11 | 106–101 | Report |
| 15 Feb | 17:00 | Savino Del Bene Scandicci | 3–0 | Cbf Balducci Hr Macerata | 25–15 | 25–20 | 25–17 | | | 75–52 | Report |
| 15 Feb | 18:00 | Igor Gorgonzola Novara | 2–3 | Honda Cuneo Granda Volley | 23–25 | 25–19 | 25–18 | 23–25 | 13–15 | 109–102 | Report |

Round 26

| Date | Time | | Score | | Set 1 | Set 2 | Set 3 | Set 4 | Set 5 | Total | Report |
|---|---|---|---|---|---|---|---|---|---|---|---|
| 21 Feb | 20:30 | Omag-Mt San Giovanni in M.no | 2–3 | Eurotek Laica Uyba | 23–25 | 25–20 | 25–18 | 19–25 | 19–21 | 111–109 | Report |
| 21 Feb | 20:30 | Prosecco Doc A.Carraro Imoco Con. | 3–1 | Wash4Green Monviso Volley | 25–22 | 22–25 | 25–16 | 25–16 | | 97–79 | Report |
| 21 Feb | 20:30 | Bartoccini-Mc Restauri Perugia | 3–2 | Reale Mutua Fenera Chieri '76 | 15–25 | 16–25 | 25–19 | 25–14 | 15–9 | 96–92 | Report |
| 21 Feb | 20:30 | Il Bisonte Firenze | 1–3 | Igor Gorgonzola Novara | 23–25 | 22–25 | 25–18 | 17–25 | | 87–93 | Report |
| 21 Feb | 20:30 | Numia Vero Volley Milano | 3–0 | Savino Del Bene Scandicci | 25–19 | 25–21 | 25–23 | | | 75–63 | Report |
| 21 Feb | 20:30 | Honda Cuneo Granda Volley | 3–2 | Megabox Ond. Savio Vallefoglia | 18–25 | 25–20 | 25–23 | 18–25 | 15–13 | 101–106 | Report |
| 21 Feb | 20:30 | Bergamo | 2–3 | Cbf Balducci Hr Macerata | 26–24 | 25–19 | 21–25 | 14–25 | 13–15 | 99–108 | Report |

== Championship playoffs ==
- All times are local, CET (UTC+01:00) between 1 March and 28 March 2026 and CEST (UTC+02:00) from 29 March 2026.
- The losers of the quarterfinals are moved to the Challenge playoffs.

=== Bracket ===
Quarterfinals
1 | Prosecco Doc A.Carraro Imoco Con. | 3 | 3
8 | Eurotek Laica Uyba | 1 | 0
4 | Igor Gorgonzola Novara | 3 | 3
5 | Reale Mutua Fenera Chieri '76 | 1 | 2
2 | Savino Del Bene Scandicci | 3 | 3
7 | Bergamo | 2 | 0
3 | Numia Vero Volley Milano | 3 | 3
6 | Megabox Ond. Savio Vallefoglia | 0 | 0

Semifinals
1 | Prosecco Doc A.Carraro Imoco Con. | 3 | 3 | 3
4 | Igor Gorgonzola Novara | 2 | 0 | 1
2 | Savino Del Bene Scandicci | 0 | 2 | 3 | 1
3 | Numia Vero Volley Milano | 3 | 3 | 1 | 3

Finals
1 | Prosecco Doc A.Carraro Imoco Con. | 3 | 3 | 1 | 3
3 | Numia Vero Volley Milano | 2 | 0 | 3 | 0

=== Quarterfinals ===
==== (1) Prosecco Doc A.Carraro Imoco Con. vs. (8) Eurotek Laica Uyba ====
| Date | Time | | Score | | Set 1 | Set 2 | Set 3 | Set 4 | Set 5 | Total | Report |
|---|---|---|---|---|---|---|---|---|---|---|---|
| 1 Mar | 17:00 | Prosecco Doc A.Carraro Imoco Con. | 3–1 | Eurotek Laica Uyba | 25–16 | 22–25 | 25–18 | 25–18 | | 97–77 | Report |
| 4 Mar | 20:30 | Eurotek Laica Uyba | 0–3 | Prosecco Doc A.Carraro Imoco Con. | 16–25 | 17–25 | 15–25 | | | 48–75 | Report |

Prosecco Doc A.Carraro Imoco Con. wins series, 2–0.

==== (2) Savino Del Bene Scandicci vs. (7) Bergamo ====
| Date | Time | | Score | | Set 1 | Set 2 | Set 3 | Set 4 | Set 5 | Total | Report |
|---|---|---|---|---|---|---|---|---|---|---|---|
| 1 Mar | 16:00 | Savino Del Bene Scandicci | 3–2 | Bergamo | 25–20 | 22–25 | 25–18 | 23–25 | 17–15 | 112–103 | Report |
| 5 Mar | 20:00 | Bergamo | 0–3 | Savino Del Bene Scandicci | 20–25 | 17–25 | 20–25 | | | 57–75 | Report |

Savino Del Bene Scandicci wins series, 2–0.

==== (3) Numia Vero Volley Milano vs. (6) Megabox Ond. Savio Vallefoglia ====
| Date | Time | | Score | | Set 1 | Set 2 | Set 3 | Set 4 | Set 5 | Total | Report |
|---|---|---|---|---|---|---|---|---|---|---|---|
| 1 Mar | 17:00 | Numia Vero Volley Milano | 3–0 | Megabox Ond. Savio Vallefoglia | 25–20 | 25–15 | 25–19 | | | 75–54 | Report |
| 4 Mar | 20:30 | Megabox Ond. Savio Vallefoglia | 0–3 | Numia Vero Volley Milano | 20–25 | 19–25 | 22–25 | | | 61–75 | Report |

Numia Vero Volley Milano wins series, 2–0.

==== (4) Igor Gorgonzola Novara vs. (5) Reale Mutua Fenera Chieri '76 ====
| Date | Time | | Score | | Set 1 | Set 2 | Set 3 | Set 4 | Set 5 | Total | Report |
|---|---|---|---|---|---|---|---|---|---|---|---|
| 1 Mar | 18:00 | Igor Gorgonzola Novara | 3–1 | Reale Mutua Fenera Chieri '76 | 25–17 | 25–17 | 22–25 | 25–17 | | 97–76 | Report |
| 4 Mar | 20:00 | Reale Mutua Fenera Chieri '76 | 2–3 | Igor Gorgonzola Novara | 20–25 | 25–22 | 25–21 | 18–25 | 16–18 | 104–111 | Report |

Igor Gorgonzola Novara wins series, 2–0.

=== Semifinals ===
==== (1) Prosecco Doc A.Carraro Imoco Con. vs. (4) Igor Gorgonzola Novara ====
| Date | Time | | Score | | Set 1 | Set 2 | Set 3 | Set 4 | Set 5 | Total | Report |
|---|---|---|---|---|---|---|---|---|---|---|---|
| 15 Mar | 17:15 | Prosecco Doc A.Carraro Imoco Con. | 3–2 | Igor Gorgonzola Novara | 23–25 | 23–25 | 25–15 | 26–24 | 15–12 | 112–101 | Report |
| 21 Mar | 21:15 | Igor Gorgonzola Novara | 0–3 | Prosecco Doc A.Carraro Imoco Con. | 12–25 | 21–25 | 17–25 | | | 50–75 | Report |
| 24 Mar | 20:30 | Prosecco Doc A.Carraro Imoco Con. | 3–1 | Igor Gorgonzola Novara | 18–25 | 25–20 | 28–26 | 25–23 | | 96–94 | Report |

Prosecco Doc A.Carraro Imoco Con. wins series, 3–0.

==== (2) Savino Del Bene Scandicci vs. (3) Numia Vero Volley Milano ====
| Date | Time | | Score | | Set 1 | Set 2 | Set 3 | Set 4 | Set 5 | Total | Report |
|---|---|---|---|---|---|---|---|---|---|---|---|
| 14 Mar | 20:30 | Savino Del Bene Scandicci | 0–3 | Numia Vero Volley Milano | 26–28 | 20–25 | 16–25 | | | 62–78 | Report |
| 22 Mar | 15:00 | Numia Vero Volley Milano | 3–2 | Savino Del Bene Scandicci | 24–26 | 13–25 | 25–15 | 25–16 | 15–6 | 102–88 | Report |
| 25 Mar | 20:30 | Savino Del Bene Scandicci | 3–1 | Numia Vero Volley Milano | 25–21 | 24–26 | 25–22 | 25–20 | | 99–89 | Report |
| 29 Mar | 20:30 | Numia Vero Volley Milano | 3–1 | Savino Del Bene Scandicci | 28–26 | 19–25 | 25–21 | 25–22 | | 97–94 | Report |

Numia Vero Volley Milano wins series, 3–1.

=== Finals ===
==== (1) Prosecco Doc A.Carraro Imoco Con. vs. (3) Numia Vero Volley Milano ====
| Date | Time | | Score | | Set 1 | Set 2 | Set 3 | Set 4 | Set 5 | Total | Report |
|---|---|---|---|---|---|---|---|---|---|---|---|
| 11 Apr | 20:30 | Prosecco Doc A.Carraro Imoco Con. | 3–2 | Numia Vero Volley Milano | 25–20 | 25–27 | 20–25 | 27–25 | 15–13 | 112–110 | Report |
| 15 Apr | 20:30 | Numia Vero Volley Milano | 0–3 | Prosecco Doc A.Carraro Imoco Con. | 21–25 | 19–25 | 18–25 | | | 58–75 | Report |
| 19 Apr | 18:00 | Prosecco Doc A.Carraro Imoco Con. | 1–3 | Numia Vero Volley Milano | 20–25 | 25–20 | 28–30 | 20–25 | | 93–100 | Report |
| 22 Apr | 20:30 | Numia Vero Volley Milano | 0–3 | Prosecco Doc A.Carraro Imoco Con. | 17–25 | 22–25 | 22–25 | | | 61–75 | Report |

Prosecco Doc A.Carraro Imoco Con. wins series, 3–1.

== Challenge playoffs ==
- All times are local, CET (UTC+01:00) between 28 February and 28 March 2026 and CEST (UTC+02:00) from 29 March 2026.

=== Pool phase ===
==== Pool A ====
| Pos | Team | Pld | W | L | Pts | SW | SL | SR | SPW | SPL | SPR | Qualification or relegation |
|---|---|---|---|---|---|---|---|---|---|---|---|---|
| 1 | Reale Mutua Fenera Chieri '76 | 6 | 5 | 1 | 15 | 15 | 5 | 3.000 | 475 | 428 | 1.110 | Challenge final |
| 2 | Eurotek Laica Uyba | 6 | 4 | 2 | 10 | 13 | 10 | 1.300 | 508 | 495 | 1.026 | |
| 3 | Il Bisonte Firenze | 6 | 2 | 4 | 6 | 7 | 14 | 0.500 | 444 | 480 | 0.925 | |
| 4 | Cbf Balducci Hr Macerata | 6 | 1 | 5 | 5 | 9 | 15 | 0.600 | 512 | 536 | 0.955 | |

Source: Lega Volley Femminile

Round 1

| Date | Time | | Score | | Set 1 | Set 2 | Set 3 | Set 4 | Set 5 | Total | Report |
|---|---|---|---|---|---|---|---|---|---|---|---|
| 28 Feb | 18:00 | Il Bisonte Firenze | 0–3 | Cbf Balducci Hr Macerata | 19–25 | 12–25 | 30–32 | | | 61–82 | Report |
| 25 Mar | 20:00 | Reale Mutua Fenera Chieri '76 | 3–0 | Eurotek Laica Uyba | 28–26 | 25–16 | 25–21 | | | 78–63 | Report |

Round 2

| Date | Time | | Score | | Set 1 | Set 2 | Set 3 | Set 4 | Set 5 | Total | Report |
|---|---|---|---|---|---|---|---|---|---|---|---|
| 15 Mar | 17:00 | Reale Mutua Fenera Chieri '76 | 3–0 | Cbf Balducci Hr Macerata | 26–24 | 25–18 | 25–20 | | | 76–62 | Report |
| 15 Mar | 17:00 | Il Bisonte Firenze | 3–1 | Eurotek Laica Uyba | 18–25 | 25–21 | 25–9 | 25–21 | | 93–76 | Report |

Round 3

| Date | Time | | Score | | Set 1 | Set 2 | Set 3 | Set 4 | Set 5 | Total | Report |
|---|---|---|---|---|---|---|---|---|---|---|---|
| 22 Mar | 17:00 | Il Bisonte Firenze | 1–3 | Reale Mutua Fenera Chieri '76 | 25–20 | 21–25 | 15–25 | 15–25 | | 76–95 | Report |
| 22 Mar | 17:00 | Eurotek Laica Uyba | 3–2 | Cbf Balducci Hr Macerata | 25–18 | 25–13 | 19–25 | 21–25 | 15–12 | 105–93 | Report |

Round 4

| Date | Time | | Score | | Set 1 | Set 2 | Set 3 | Set 4 | Set 5 | Total | Report |
|---|---|---|---|---|---|---|---|---|---|---|---|
| 7 Mar | 18:00 | Cbf Balducci Hr Macerata | 1–3 | Il Bisonte Firenze | 25–18 | 23–25 | 20–25 | 9–25 | | 77–93 | Report |
| 4 Apr | 17:00 | Eurotek Laica Uyba | 3–0 | Reale Mutua Fenera Chieri '76 | 25–18 | 25–21 | 26–24 | | | 76–63 | Report |

Round 5

| Date | Time | | Score | | Set 1 | Set 2 | Set 3 | Set 4 | Set 5 | Total | Report |
|---|---|---|---|---|---|---|---|---|---|---|---|
| 28 Mar | 18:00 | Cbf Balducci Hr Macerata | 1–3 | Reale Mutua Fenera Chieri '76 | 25–13 | 23–25 | 19–25 | 19–25 | | 86–88 | Report |
| 30 Mar | 20:00 | Eurotek Laica Uyba | 3–0 | Il Bisonte Firenze | 25–21 | 25–15 | 25–20 | | | 75–56 | Report |

Round 6

| Date | Time | | Score | | Set 1 | Set 2 | Set 3 | Set 4 | Set 5 | Total | Report |
|---|---|---|---|---|---|---|---|---|---|---|---|
| 12 Apr | 17:00 | Reale Mutua Fenera Chieri '76 | 3–0 | Il Bisonte Firenze | 25–22 | 25–23 | 25–20 | | | 75–65 | Report |
| 12 Apr | 17:00 | Cbf Balducci Hr Macerata | 2–3 | Eurotek Laica Uyba | 25–22 | 24–26 | 25–23 | 23–25 | 15–17 | 112–113 | Report |

==== Pool B ====
| Pos | Team | Pld | W | L | Pts | SW | SL | SR | SPW | SPL | SPR | Qualification or relegation |
|---|---|---|---|---|---|---|---|---|---|---|---|---|
| 1 | Honda Cuneo Granda Volley | 6 | 5 | 1 | 13 | 16 | 9 | 1.778 | 579 | 536 | 1.080 | Challenge final |
| 2 | Bergamo | 6 | 3 | 3 | 8 | 13 | 15 | 0.867 | 596 | 589 | 1.012 | |
| 3 | Megabox Ond. Savio Vallefoglia | 6 | 2 | 4 | 8 | 12 | 13 | 0.923 | 573 | 574 | 0.998 | |
| 4 | Omag-Mt San Giovanni in M.no | 6 | 2 | 4 | 7 | 11 | 15 | 0.733 | 544 | 593 | 0.917 | |

Source: Lega Volley Femminile

Round 1

| Date | Time | | Score | | Set 1 | Set 2 | Set 3 | Set 4 | Set 5 | Total | Report |
|---|---|---|---|---|---|---|---|---|---|---|---|
| 1 Mar | 17:00 | Honda Cuneo Granda Volley | 3–1 | Omag-Mt San Giovanni in M.no | 25–18 | 23–25 | 25–23 | 25–19 | | 98–85 | Report |
| 26 Mar | 20:30 | Megabox Ond. Savio Vallefoglia | 3–0 | Bergamo | 25–22 | 25–19 | 25–20 | | | 75–61 | Report |

Round 2

| Date | Time | | Score | | Set 1 | Set 2 | Set 3 | Set 4 | Set 5 | Total | Report |
|---|---|---|---|---|---|---|---|---|---|---|---|
| 14 Mar | 20:30 | Megabox Ond. Savio Vallefoglia | 1–3 | Omag-Mt San Giovanni in M.no | 20–25 | 25–27 | 25–22 | 22–25 | | 92–99 | Report |
| 15 Mar | 17:00 | Honda Cuneo Granda Volley | 3–2 | Bergamo | 21–25 | 25–19 | 25–19 | 19–25 | 15–10 | 105–98 | Report |

Round 3

| Date | Time | | Score | | Set 1 | Set 2 | Set 3 | Set 4 | Set 5 | Total | Report |
|---|---|---|---|---|---|---|---|---|---|---|---|
| 20 Mar | 20:00 | Bergamo | 3–2 | Omag-Mt San Giovanni in M.no | 22–25 | 25–17 | 17–25 | 25–19 | 15–8 | 104–94 | Report |
| 22 Mar | 17:00 | Honda Cuneo Granda Volley | 1–3 | Megabox Ond. Savio Vallefoglia | 21–25 | 25–27 | 32–30 | 23–25 | | 101–107 | Report |

Round 4

| Date | Time | | Score | | Set 1 | Set 2 | Set 3 | Set 4 | Set 5 | Total | Report |
|---|---|---|---|---|---|---|---|---|---|---|---|
| 8 Mar | 17:00 | Omag-Mt San Giovanni in M.no | 0–3 | Honda Cuneo Granda Volley | 10–25 | 14–25 | 24–26 | | | 48–76 | Report |
| 3 Apr | 20:00 | Bergamo | 3–2 | Megabox Ond. Savio Vallefoglia | 23–25 | 25–20 | 25–19 | 24–26 | 15–9 | 112–99 | Report |

Round 5

| Date | Time | | Score | | Set 1 | Set 2 | Set 3 | Set 4 | Set 5 | Total | Report |
|---|---|---|---|---|---|---|---|---|---|---|---|
| 30 Mar | 20:00 | Omag-Mt San Giovanni in M.no | 3–2 | Megabox Ond. Savio Vallefoglia | 21–25 | 26–24 | 20–25 | 30–28 | 15–12 | 112–114 | Report |
| 30 Mar | 20:00 | Bergamo | 2–3 | Honda Cuneo Granda Volley | 25–18 | 23–25 | 23–25 | 29–27 | 12–15 | 112–110 | Report |

Round 6

| Date | Time | | Score | | Set 1 | Set 2 | Set 3 | Set 4 | Set 5 | Total | Report |
|---|---|---|---|---|---|---|---|---|---|---|---|
| 8 Apr | 20:00 | Omag-Mt San Giovanni in M.no | 2–3 | Bergamo | 22–25 | 25–23 | 25–20 | 24–26 | 10–15 | 106–109 | Report |
| 12 Apr | 17:00 | Megabox Ond. Savio Vallefoglia | 1–3 | Honda Cuneo Granda Volley | 20–25 | 25–14 | 20–25 | 21–25 | | 86–89 | Report |

=== Challenge final ===
| Date | Time | | Score | | Set 1 | Set 2 | Set 3 | Set 4 | Set 5 | Total | Report |
|---|---|---|---|---|---|---|---|---|---|---|---|
| 18 Apr | 20:00 | Reale Mutua Fenera Chieri '76 | 3–0 | Honda Cuneo Granda Volley | 25–23 | 25–18 | 25–15 | | | 75–56 | Report |

== Final standings ==
| 1st place, gold medalist(s) | Prosecco Doc A.Carraro Imoco Conegliano |
| 2nd place, silver medalist(s) | Numia Vero Volley Milano |
| | Savino Del Bene Scandicci |
| | Igor Gorgonzola Novara (Note: In July 2026, CEV announced that Igor Gorgonzola Novara had received a wild card to the 2026–27 CEV Champions League. Reale Mutua Fenera Chieri '76 replaced Igor Gorgonzola Novara as the Italian team in the 2026–27 CEV Cup.) |
| | Reale Mutua Fenera Chieri '76 |

Qualified for 2026–27 CEV Champions League
Qualified for 2026–27 CEV Cup
Qualified for 2026–27 CEV Challenge Cup

2025–26 Italian champions
Prosecco Doc A.Carraro Imoco Conegliano
9th title

Gabriela Guimarães, Zhu Ting, Serena Scognamillo, Jenna Ewert, Marina Lubian, Monica De Gennaro, Isabelle Haak, Matilde Munarini, Joanna Wołosz (C), Merit Adigwe, Nika Daalderop, Cristina Chirichella, Sarah Fahr, Fatoumatta Sillah
Head coach
Daniele Santarelli
