= Helvia Recina Volley Macerata =

Italian professional women's volleyball club

Helvia Recina Volley
- Full name: Helvia Recina Volley Macerata
- Short name: HR Volley
- Ground: PalaFontescodella; Macerata, Italy (Capacity: 2,100)
- Chairman: Pietro Paolella
- Head coach: Valerio Lionetti
- League: FIPAV Women's Serie A1
- Website: Club home page

Uniforms
Home	Away

Helvia Recina Volley Macerata, also known as HR Volley, is an Italian professional women's volleyball club based in Macerata. The team currently plays in the Serie A1, Italy's highest professional league.

== Previous names ==
Due to sponsorship, the club has competed under the following names:

- Acqua Roana Mosca HR Macerata (2012–2013)
- Roana Mosca CBF HR Macerata (2013–2014)
- Roana CBF HR Macerata (2014–2020)
- CBF Balducci HR Macerata (2020–present)

== History ==
Helvia Recina Volley was founded in the early 1990s by Tito Antinori, who was the club's president until his death in 2015. The club started to play in the local provincial series, but later moved up to the regional Serie D. In 2009, HR Volley was promoted to the regional Serie C and in 2012, the club advanced to the national Serie B2. After playing there for five seasons, HR Volley won pool F of Serie B2 in 2017 and got promoted to Serie B1.

After winning pool C of Serie B1 in 2019, the club made its debut in Serie A2. In its second season playing in Serie A2 (2020–21), HR Volley won the Serie A2 Coppa Italia. The following season (2021–22), the club won the Serie A2 playoffs and got promoted to Serie A1. HR Volley finished its first season in Serie A1 (2022–23) in last place and was relegated to Serie A2 again. In the 2024–25 season, the club once again managed to win the Serie A2 playoffs and secured its second promotion to Serie A1.

== Team ==
2026–2027 Team
Number	Player	Position	Height (m)	Birth date
1	(Italy) Roberta Carraro	Setter	1.81	17 November 1998 (age 27)
5	(Italy) Chiara Landucci	Middle Blocker	1.85	22 May 2002 (age 24)
6	(Netherlands) Susan Schut	Outside Hitter	1.82	28 March 2003 (age 23)
7	(Italy) Asia Bonelli	Setter	1.81	4 September 2000 (age 26)
8	(Italy) Alessia Mazzon	Middle Blocker	1.84	17 August 1998 (age 28)
9	(Italy) Nicole Piomboni	Outside Hitter	1.80	22 November 2005 (age 20)
10	(Italy) Melissa Tesi	Libero	1.70	4 November 2002 (age 23)
11	(Argentina) Bianca Farriol	Middle Blocker	1.87	18 December 2001 (age 24)
12	(Italy) Alessia Mazzaro	Middle Blocker	1.85	19 September 1998 (age 28)
14	(Italy) Giorgia Caforio (c)	Libero	1.68	16 September 1994 (age 32)
16	(Italy) Beatrice Gardini	Outside Hitter	1.84	1 April 2003 (age 23)
17	(Italy) Clara Decortes	Opposite	1.83	7 March 1996 (age 30)
20	(Bulgaria) Mikaela Stoyanova	Opposite	1.94	23 June 2005 (age 21)

2025–2026 Team
Number	Player	Position	Height (m)	Birth date
1	(Italy) Giulia Bresciani (c)	Libero	1.65	27 September 1992 (age 34)
3	(Italy) Ilaria Batte	Setter	1.85	27 June 2005 (age 21)
4	(Italy) Ludovica Sismondi	Middle Blocker	1.91	7 July 2007 (age 19)
5	(Finland) Suvi Kokkonen	Outside Hitter	1.82	1 February 2000 (age 26)
6	(Serbia) Isidora Kockarević	Outside Hitter	1.85	12 January 2002 (age 24)
7	(Italy) Asia Bonelli	Setter	1.81	4 September 2000 (age 26)
8	(Italy) Alessia Mazzon	Middle Blocker	1.84	17 August 1998 (age 28)
9	(Italy) Nicole Piomboni	Outside Hitter	1.80	22 November 2005 (age 20)
10	(Poland) Natasza Ornoch	Outside Hitter	1.89	25 December 2007 (age 18)
14	(Italy) Giorgia Caforio	Libero	1.68	16 September 1994 (age 32)
15	(United States) Caroline Crawford	Middle Blocker	1.89	5 March 2002 (age 24)
16	(United States) Emma Clothier	Middle Blocker	1.88	19 January 2001 (age 25)
17	(Italy) Clara Decortes	Opposite	1.83	7 March 1996 (age 30)

2024–2025 Team
Number	Player	Position	Height (m)	Birth date
1	(Italy) Giulia Bresciani	Libero	1.65	27 September 1992 (age 34)
2	(Italy) Valeria Battista	Outside Hitter	1.79	23 January 2001 (age 25)
5	(Italy) Safa Allaoui (Note: Safa Allaoui joined the team on 5 December 2024.)	Setter	1.85	1 February 2006 (age 20)
6	(Italy) Aurora Morandini	Libero	1.69	14 July 2000 (age 26)
7	(Italy) Asia Bonelli	Setter	1.81	4 September 2000 (age 26)
8	(Italy) Alessia Mazzon	Middle Blocker	1.84	17 August 1998 (age 28)
9	(Italy) Lea Andrea Orlandi	Middle Blocker	1.82	7 August 2006 (age 20)
10	(Argentina) Daniela Bulaich	Outside Hitter	1.78	5 September 1997 (age 29)
~~11~~	(Italy) ~~Federica Braida~~ (Note: Federica Braida left the team on 4 December 2024.)	~~Setter~~	~~1.82~~	~~31 August 2000 (age 26)~~
12	(Italy) Federica Busolini	Middle Blocker	1.86	22 July 1999 (age 27)
14	(Italy) Alessia Fiesoli (c)	Outside Hitter	1.85	25 May 1994 (age 32)
15	(Italy) Camilla Sanguigni	Outside Hitter	1.77	19 January 2001 (age 25)
16	(Italy) Sara Caruso	Middle Blocker	1.93	5 February 2001 (age 25)
17	(Italy) Clara Decortes	Opposite	1.83	7 March 1996 (age 30)

2023–2024 Team
Number	Player	Position	Height (m)	Birth date
1	(Italy) Giulia Bresciani	Libero	1.65	27 September 1992 (age 34)
2	(Italy) Arianna Vittorini	Outside Hitter	1.81	5 September 2002 (age 24)
3	(Italy) Alessia Bolzonetti	Outside Hitter	1.87	15 February 2002 (age 24)
4	(Italy) Alessia Masciullo	Setter	1.83	11 November 2004 (age 21)
6	(Italy) Aurora Morandini	Libero	1.69	14 July 2000 (age 26)
7	(Italy) Asia Bonelli	Setter	1.81	4 September 2000 (age 26)
8	(Italy) Alessia Mazzon	Middle Blocker	1.84	17 August 1998 (age 28)
9	(Italy) Giorgia Quarchioni	Outside Hitter	1.88	3 April 1995 (age 31)
10	(Montenegro) Danijela Džaković (Note: Danijela Džaković joined the team on 26 February 2024.)	Opposite	1.83	4 May 1994 (age 32)
11	(Germany) Laura Broekstra (Note: Laura Broekstra joined the team on 25 January 2024.)	Middle Blocker	1.91	3 January 1997 (age 29)
12	(Italy) Federica Busolini	Middle Blocker	1.86	22 July 1999 (age 27)
~~13~~	(Finland) ~~Piia Korhonen~~ (Note: Piia Korhonen left the team on 23 February 2024.)	~~Opposite~~	~~1.87~~	~~12 January 1997 (age 29)~~
14	(Italy) Alessia Fiesoli (c)	Outside Hitter	1.85	25 May 1994 (age 32)
16	(Italy) Giada Civitico	Middle Blocker	1.91	5 December 2000 (age 25)
18	(Italy) Federica Stroppa	Opposite	1.82	9 February 1997 (age 29)

2022–2023 Team
Number	Player	Position	Height (m)	Birth date
1	(Italy) Francesca Cosi	Middle Blocker	1.89	27 March 2000 (age 26)
3	(Italy) Silvia Fiori	Libero	1.62	18 July 1994 (age 32)
4	(United States) Symone Abbott	Outside Hitter	1.86	27 September 1996 (age 30)
5	(Italy) Francesca Napodano	Libero	1.75	17 January 1999 (age 27)
7	(United States) Claire Chaussee (Note: Claire Chaussee joined the team at the end of December 2022.)	Outside Hitter	1.82	15 May 2000 (age 26)
8	(Italy) Maria Irene Ricci	Setter	1.81	17 February 1996 (age 30)
9	(Italy) Giorgia Quarchioni	Outside Hitter	1.88	3 April 1995 (age 31)
11	(United States) Akuabata Okenwa	Opposite	1.90	22 July 1998 (age 28)
12	(Italy) Beatrice Molinaro	Middle Blocker	1.90	15 June 1995 (age 31)
~~13~~	(Bulgaria) ~~Nikol Milanova~~ (Note: Nikol Milanova left the team on 19 January 2023.)	~~Setter~~	~~1.91~~	~~10 August 2002 (age 24)~~
14	(Italy) Alessia Fiesoli (c)	Outside Hitter	1.85	25 May 1994 (age 32)
15	(Israel) Polina Malik	Opposite	1.86	18 November 1998 (age 27)
18	(Italy) Aurora Poli	Middle Blocker	1.88	19 November 1999 (age 26)
19	(Belgium) Freya Aelbrecht (Note: Freya Aelbrecht joined the team in early January 2023.)	Middle Blocker	1.86	10 February 1990 (age 36)
24	(Netherlands) Laura Dijkema (Note: Laura Dijkema joined the team in early December 2022.)	Setter	1.84	18 February 1990 (age 36)
77	(Poland) Aleksandra Lipska	Outside Hitter	1.85	25 February 1998 (age 28)

2021–2022 Team
Number	Player	Position	Height (m)	Birth date
1	(Italy) Giulia Bresciani	Libero	1.65	27 September 1992 (age 34)
2	(Italy) Melissa Martinelli	Middle Blocker	1.90	23 March 1993 (age 33)
3	(Italy) Francesca Cosi	Middle Blocker	1.89	27 March 2000 (age 26)
5	(Italy) Francesca Michieletto	Outside Hitter	1.84	10 September 1997 (age 29)
6	(Italy) Alice Gasparroni	Outside Hitter	1.78	17 March 2001 (age 25)
7	(Italy) Martina Ghezzi	Outside Hitter	1.83	20 August 2001 (age 25)
8	(Italy) Maria Irene Ricci	Setter	1.81	17 February 1996 (age 30)
9	(Italy) Federica Stroppa	Opposite	1.82	9 February 1997 (age 29)
10	(Italy) Ilenia Peretti (c)	Setter	1.80	1 December 1997 (age 28)
11	(Italy) Valeria Pizzolato	Middle Blocker	1.82	20 May 1999 (age 27)
14	(Italy) Alessia Fiesoli	Outside Hitter	1.85	25 May 1994 (age 32)
15	(Israel) Polina Malik	Opposite	1.86	18 November 1998 (age 27)

== Head coaches ==
Period	Head coach
2017–2023	(Italy) Luca Paniconi
2023–2024	(Italy) Stefano Saja
2024–2024	(Italy) Michele Carancini
2024–	(Italy) Valerio Lionetti
