= Polisportiva Adolfo Consolini =

Italian professional women's volleyball club

Consolini Volley
- Full name: Polisportiva Adolfo Consolini
- Founded: 1970
- Ground: Pala Marignano, San Giovanni in Marignano, Italy (Capacity: 420)
- Chairman: Stefano Manconi
- Head coach: Massimo Bellano
- League: FIPAV Women's Serie A1
- Website: Club home page

Uniforms
Home	Away

Polisportiva Adolfo Consolini, also known as Consolini Volley, is an Italian women's volleyball club based in San Giovanni in Marignano. The team currently plays in the Serie A1, Italy's highest professional league.

== Previous names ==
Due to sponsorship, the club has competed under the following names:

- LAR San Giovanni in Marignano (2010–2013)
- LAR Battistelli San Giovanni in Marignano (2013–2014)
- Battistelli San Giovanni in Marignano (2014–2018)
- OMAG San Giovanni in Marignano (2018–2021)
- OMAG-MT San Giovanni in Marignano (2021–2026)
- OMAG Consolini Volley 1907 (2026–)

== History ==
The club started in 1970, when a group of players decided to form an amateur team. A few years later, groups of children and young people start enrolling to play and the club enters the regional league. Through the years the club restructured and progressed in the regional and national leagues, reaching Series D and C. At the end of the 2012–13 season, after missing a promotion by losing the Serie C final playoffs, the club acquired a Serie B2 license for the following season. The club finished 4th in its Serie B2 debut season (2013–14) and in the following season achieved promotion to Serie B1. In its first season at B1 the club became champions and gained promotion to Serie A2 for the 2016–17 season.

In the 2024–25 season of Serie A2, Consolini Volley won the promotion pool and advanced to the Serie A1 for the 2025–26 season.

== Partnership with Fenerbahçe ==
A three-year agreement covering the 2025–26, 2026–27 and 2027–28 seasons has been reached with CEV Champions League and Turkish Sultanlar Ligi club Fenerbahçe on a project to enhance financial support and technical cooperation. Under this agreement, both clubs will conduct scouting activities worldwide to identify young talent and provide them with experience in Romagna before stepping onto the highest level.

== Venue ==
The club plays its home matches at the Palazzetto dello Sport in San Giovanni in Marignano. The venue has capacity of 420 spectators (expandable to around 600).

== Team ==
2026–2027 Team
Number	Player	Position	Height (m)	Birth date
2	(Italy) Martina Bracchi	Outside Hitter	1.82	25 April 2002 (age 24)
~~3~~	(France) ~~Amandha Sylves~~ (Note: Amandha Sylves left the team on 28 October 2026.)	~~Middle Blocker~~	~~1.96~~	~~29 December 2000 (age 25)~~
4	(Spain) Jessica Rivero	Outside Hitter	1.81	15 March 1995 (age 31)
7	(Italy) Rebecca Scialanca	Libero	1.65	29 May 2005 (age 21)
9	(Italy) Anna Adelusi	Opposite	1.86	10 June 2003 (age 23)
10	(Turkey) Dalia Wilson	Middle Blocker	1.94	28 October 2004 (age 22)
11	(Italy) Anita Bagnoli	Setter	1.75	21 August 2004 (age 22)
13	(Italy) Sara Panetoni (c)	Libero	1.75	6 May 2000 (age 26)
14	(Turkey) Pelin Eroktay	Opposite	1.88	14 November 2004 (age 21)
15	(Czech Republic) Magdaléna Jehlářová	Middle Blocker	1.89	16 January 2000 (age 26)
17	(Italy) Alice Nardo	Outside Hitter	1.82	15 December 2002 (age 23)
18	(Italy) Veronica Costantini	Middle Blocker	1.91	23 March 2003 (age 23)
19	(Italy) Margherita Brandi	Middle Blocker	1.83	18 October 2002 (age 24)
23	(Italy) Dominika Giuliani	Outside Hitter	1.92	26 November 2004 (age 21)
24	(Italy) Rachele Morello	Setter	1.83	7 November 2000 (age 26)

2025–2026 Team
Number	Player	Position	Height (m)	Birth date
1	(Italy) Serena Ortolani (c)	Opposite	1.87	7 January 1987 (age 39)
2	(Italy) Martina Bracchi	Outside Hitter	1.82	25 April 2002 (age 24)
4	(Italy) Cecilia Nicolini	Setter	1.81	18 June 1994 (age 32)
5	(China) Yushan Zhuang (Note: Yushan Zhuang joined the team at the end of November 2025.)	Outside Hitter	1.84	28 April 2003 (age 23)
6	(Brazil) Edinara Brancher	Opposite	1.86	1 February 1996 (age 30)
~~7~~	(Italy) ~~Giada Cecchetto~~ (Note: Giada Cecchetto left the team on 16 December 2025.)	~~Libero~~	~~1.64~~	~~6 June 1991 (age 35)~~
8	(Italy) Anna Piovesan	Outside Hitter	1.86	27 March 2004 (age 22)
9	(Italy) Sveva Parini	Middle Blocker	1.85	3 March 2001 (age 25)
~~10~~	(Italy) ~~Arianna Meliffi~~ (Note: Arianna Meliffi left the team on 27 November 2025.)	~~Libero~~	~~1.70~~	~~3 March 2005 (age 21)~~
10	(Turkey) Dalia Wilson (Note: Dalia Wilson joined the team in December 2025.)	Middle Blocker	1.94	28 October 2004 (age 22)
11	(Russia) Elizaveta Kochurina	Middle Blocker	1.90	1 October 2002 (age 24)
12	(Italy) Agata Tellone	Libero	1.65	4 January 2002 (age 24)
13	(Italy) Sara Panetoni	Libero	1.75	6 May 2000 (age 26)
16	(Italy) Sara Caruso	Middle Blocker	1.93	5 February 2001 (age 25)
17	(Italy) Alice Nardo	Outside Hitter	1.82	15 December 2002 (age 23)
18	(Germany) Sarah Straube	Setter	1.85	26 April 2002 (age 24)

2024–2025 Team
Number	Player	Position	Height (m)	Birth date
1	(Italy) Serena Ortolani (c)	Opposite	1.87	7 January 1987 (age 39)
3	(Italy) Giulia Polesello	Middle Blocker	1.85	8 April 2004 (age 22)
4	(Italy) Cecilia Nicolini	Setter	1.81	18 June 1994 (age 32)
5	(Italy) Sofia Valoppi	Libero	1.67	25 July 2003 (age 23)
6	(Italy) Alexandra Ravarini	Opposite	1.84	8 July 2005 (age 21)
7	(Italy) Claudia Consoli	Middle Blocker	1.83	4 February 2002 (age 24)
8	(Italy) Anna Piovesan	Outside Hitter	1.86	27 March 2004 (age 22)
9	(Italy) Sveva Parini	Middle Blocker	1.85	3 March 2001 (age 25)
10	(Italy) Arianna Meliffi	Libero	1.70	3 March 2005 (age 21)
11	(Italy) Anita Bagnoli	Setter	1.75	21 August 2004 (age 22)
12	(Italy) Martina Monti	Outside Hitter	1.76	16 August 2008 (age 18)
14	(Italy) Victoria Sassolini	Outside Hitter	1.80	14 January 2005 (age 21)
15	(Italy) Siria Clemente	Middle Blocker	1.83	27 May 2005 (age 21)
17	(Italy) Alice Nardo	Outside Hitter	1.82	15 December 2002 (age 23)
18	(Italy) Ludovica Merli	Outside Hitter	1.81	31 December 2006 (age 19)

2023–2024 Team
Number	Player	Position	Height (m)	Birth date
1	(Italy) Serena Ortolani (c)	Opposite	1.87	7 January 1987 (age 39)
2	(Italy) Linda Cabassa	Outside Hitter	1.78	25 July 2004 (age 22)
4	(Italy) Chiara Salvatori	Middle Blocker	1.85	7 March 2003 (age 23)
5	(Italy) Sofia Cangini	Outside Hitter	1.78	25 May 2005 (age 21)
6	(Italy) Chiara Ghibaudo	Setter	1.81	25 December 2003 (age 22)
7	(Italy) Claudia Consoli	Middle Blocker	1.83	4 February 2002 (age 24)
8	(Italy) Giulia Saguatti	Outside Hitter	1.78	20 November 1991 (age 34)
9	(Italy) Sveva Parini	Middle Blocker	1.85	3 March 2001 (age 25)
10	(Italy) Arianna Meliffi	Libero	1.70	3 March 2005 (age 21)
11	(Italy) Marina Giacomello	Opposite	1.90	1 April 2004 (age 22)
12	(Italy) Alice Turco	Setter	1.78	4 February 2000 (age 26)
14	(Italy) Giorgia Caforio	Libero	1.68	16 September 1994 (age 32)
15	(Italy) Carolina Pecorari	Outside Hitter	1.84	7 January 2003 (age 23)
17	(Italy) Alice Nardo	Outside Hitter	1.82	15 December 2002 (age 23)
18	(Italy) Alice Urbinati (Note: Alice Urbinati joined the team in December 2023.)	Libero	1.63	28 February 2000 (age 26)

2022–2023 Team
Number	Player	Position	Height (m)	Birth date
1	(Montenegro) Nikoleta Perovic	Opposite	1.85	1 November 1994 (age 32)
2	(Italy) Giulia Biagini	Libero	1.65	10 August 2000 (age 26)
3	(Italy) Alessia Bolzonetti	Outside Hitter	1.87	15 February 2002 (age 24)
4	(Italy) Chiara Salvatori	Middle Blocker	1.85	7 March 2003 (age 23)
5	(Italy) Sofia Cangini	Outside Hitter	1.78	25 May 2005 (age 21)
6	(Bulgaria) Vangeliya Rachkovska	Outside Hitter	1.85	19 July 1997 (age 29)
7	(Italy) Clarissa Covino	Outside Hitter	1.82	28 October 2001 (age 25)
8	(Italy) Giulia Saguatti (c)	Outside Hitter	1.78	20 November 1991 (age 34)
9	(Italy) Sveva Parini	Middle Blocker	1.85	3 March 2001 (age 25)
10	(Italy) Mariaelena Aluigi	Setter	1.75	20 June 2001 (age 25)
12	(Italy) Alice Turco	Setter	1.78	4 February 2000 (age 26)
14	(Italy) Giorgia Caforio	Libero	1.68	16 September 1994 (age 32)
18	(Italy) Maria Adelaide Babatunde	Middle Blocker	1.88	3 April 1998 (age 28)

2021–2022 Team
Number	Player	Position	Height (m)	Birth date
1	(Italy) Serena Ortolani	Opposite	1.87	7 January 1987 (age 39)
2	(Italy) Giulia Biagini	Libero	1.65	10 August 2000 (age 26)
3	(Italy) Alessia Bolzonetti	Outside Hitter	1.87	15 February 2002 (age 24)
4	(Italy) Sara Ceron (c)	Middle Blocker	1.89	4 July 1993 (age 33)
5	(Italy) Eleonora Penna	Outside Hitter	1.81	15 August 2003 (age 23)
6	(Italy) Salimatou Coulibaly	Outside Hitter	1.73	22 October 1995 (age 31)
7	(Italy) Claudia Consoli	Middle Blocker	1.83	4 February 2002 (age 24)
8	(Italy) Alessia Mazzon	Middle Blocker	1.84	17 August 1998 (age 28)
9	(Italy) Martina Brina	Outside Hitter	1.90	14 December 1996 (age 29)
10	(Italy) Mariaelena Aluigi	Setter	1.75	20 June 2001 (age 25)
11	(Italy) Ilaria Bonvicini	Libero	1.65	28 February 1997 (age 29)
12	(Italy) Alice Turco	Setter	1.78	4 February 2000 (age 26)
13	(Slovakia) Romana Krišková (Note: Romana Krišková joined the team in early March 2022.)	Opposite	1.88	2 May 1993 (age 33)
16	(Italy) Chiara Zonta	Opposite	1.85	26 August 2001 (age 25)

2020–2021 Team
Number	Player	Position	Height (m)	Birth date
1	(Italy) Francesca Cosi	Middle Blocker	1.89	27 March 2000 (age 26)
2	(Italy) Dora Peonia	Outside Hitter	1.83	20 September 1997 (age 29)
3	(Italy) Linda De Bellis	Opposite	1.90	29 May 2001 (age 25)
4	(Italy) Emanuela Fiore	Opposite	1.83	25 October 1986 (age 40)
5	(Italy) Sara Ceron	Middle Blocker	1.89	4 July 1993 (age 33)
6	(Brazil) Lana Conceição	Outside Hitter	1.82	8 December 1996 (age 29)
7	(Italy) Sofia Spadoni	Middle Blocker	1.81	27 September 1996 (age 30)
8	(Italy) Mariaelena Aluigi	Setter	1.75	20 June 2001 (age 25)
9	(Italy) Alice Urbinati	Libero	1.63	28 February 2000 (age 26)
10	(Italy) Giulia Saguatti	Outside Hitter	1.78	20 November 1991 (age 34)
11	(Italy) Ilaria Bonvicini	Libero	1.65	28 February 1997 (age 29)
12	(Italy) Virginia Berasi	Setter	1.70	17 February 1994 (age 32)
14	(Italy) Eleonora Penna	Outside Hitter	1.81	15 August 2003 (age 23)
15	(Italy) Martina Fedrigo	Outside Hitter	1.83	28 April 1999 (age 27)

2019–2020 Team
Number	Player	Position	Height (m)	Birth date
1	(Italy) Giulia Bresciani	Libero	1.65	27 September 1992 (age 34)
3	(Italy) Linda De Bellis	Opposite	1.90	29 May 2001 (age 25)
5	(Italy) Ilaria Battistoni	Setter	1.74	22 April 1996 (age 30)
6	(Italy) Salimatou Coulibaly	Outside Hitter	1.73	22 October 1995 (age 31)
7	(Italy) Greta Pinali	Outside Hitter	1.85	2 April 1997 (age 29)
8	(Italy) Giulia Saguatti	Outside Hitter	1.78	20 November 1991 (age 34)
9	(Italy) Asia Bonelli	Setter	1.81	4 September 2000 (age 26)
10	(Italy) Alice Pamio	Outside Hitter	1.81	15 January 1998 (age 28)
12	(Italy) Alessia Mazzon	Middle Blocker	1.84	17 August 1998 (age 28)
13	(Italy) Greta Mandrelli	Libero	1.70	3 July 2002 (age 24)
14	(Italy) Francesca Saveriano	Setter	1.74	28 June 1993 (age 33)
15	(Italy) Anna Gray	Middle Blocker	1.87	15 November 1996 (age 29)
17	(Italy) Clara Decortes	Opposite	1.83	7 March 1996 (age 30)
18	(Italy) Giuditta Lualdi	Middle Blocker	1.86	13 September 1995 (age 31)

2018–2019 Team
Number	Player	Position	Height (m)	Birth date
1	(United States) Erin Fairs	Outside Hitter	1.80	14 August 1994 (age 32)
3	(Italy) Greta Mandrelli	Libero	1.70	3 July 2002 (age 24)
5	(Italy) Ilaria Battistoni	Setter	1.74	22 April 1996 (age 30)
7	(Italy) Greta Pinali	Outside Hitter	1.85	2 April 1997 (age 29)
8	(Italy) Giulia Saguatti	Outside Hitter	1.78	20 November 1991 (age 34)
9	(Italy) Bianca Mazzotti	Setter	1.83	12 November 1998 (age 27)
10	(Italy) Giulia Gibertini	Libero	1.72	30 September 1994 (age 32)
11	(Italy) Costanza Manfredini	Opposite	1.88	16 July 1988 (age 38)
13	(Italy) Martina Casprini	Opposite	1.87	11 June 1993 (age 33)
14	(Italy) Alessandra Guasti	Outside Hitter	1.85	7 August 1996 (age 30)
15	(Italy) Anna Gray	Middle Blocker	1.87	15 November 1996 (age 29)
17	(Italy) Anna Caneva	Middle Blocker	1.87	18 March 1992 (age 34)
18	(Italy) Giuditta Lualdi	Middle Blocker	1.86	13 September 1995 (age 31)

2017–2018 Team
Number	Player	Position	Height (m)	Birth date
1	(Italy) Luisa Casillo	Middle Blocker	1.88	8 July 1988 (age 38)
2	(Italy) Martina Bordignon	Outside Hitter	1.82	26 November 1994 (age 31)
5	(Italy) Ilaria Battistoni	Setter	1.74	22 April 1996 (age 30)
6	(Austria) Srna Markovic	Outside Hitter	1.84	6 June 1996 (age 30)
7	(Italy) Elisa Zanette	Opposite	1.93	17 February 1996 (age 30)
8	(Italy) Giulia Saguatti	Outside Hitter	1.80	20 November 1991 (age 34)
10	(Italy) Giulia Gibertini	Libero	1.70	30 September 1984 (age 42)
12	(Italy) Anna Gray	Middle Blocker	1.87	15 November 1996 (age 29)
13	(Italy) Federica Nasari	Opposite	1.88	3 September 1991 (age 35)
14	(Italy) Alberta Sgarbossa	Outside Hitter	1.86	4 January 1997 (age 29)
15	(Italy) Benedetta Giordano	Setter	1.78	27 September 1999 (age 27)
17	(Italy) Anna Caneva	Middle Blocker	1.86	18 March 1992 (age 34)

2016–2017 Team
Number	Player	Position	Height (m)	Birth date
1	(Russia) Olga Vyazovik	Outside Hitter	1.82	20 February 1988 (age 38)
2	(Italy) Valeria Tallevi	Outside Hitter	1.80	27 August 1989 (age 37)
3	(Italy) Sara Angelini	Middle Blocker	1.85	13 October 1989 (age 37)
5	(Italy) Ilaria Battistoni	Setter	1.74	22 April 1996 (age 30)
7	(Italy) Sara Giuliodori	Middle Blocker	1.80	5 June 1983 (age 43)
8	(Italy) Giulia Saguatti	Outside Hitter	1.80	20 November 1991 (age 34)
9	(Italy) Marta Agostinetto	Outside Hitter	1.85	22 April 1987 (age 39)
10	(Italy) Alessia Lanzini	Libero	1.65	28 August 1981 (age 45)
11	(Italy) Alessia Sgherza	Outside Hitter	1.86	25 January 1997 (age 29)
13	(Italy) Bianca Boccioletti	Libero	1.68	8 February 1993 (age 33)
17	(Italy) Aleksandra Rynk	Setter	1.78	14 December 1988 (age 37)
18	(Italy) Gaia Moretto	Middle Blocker	1.92	18 September 1994 (age 32)

== Head coaches ==
Period	Head coach
2014–2016	(Italy) Matteo Solforati
2016–2017	(Italy) Riccardo Marchesi
2017–2021	(Italy) Stefano Saja
2021–2023	(Italy) Enrico Barbolini
2023–2024	(Italy) Matteo Bertini
2024–	(Italy) Massimo Bellano
