= 2021–22 Italian Women's Volleyball League =

2021–22 Italian Women's Serie A1
- League: Italian Women's Volleyball League
- Sport: Volleyball
- Duration: 9 October 2021 – 10 May 2022
- Teams: 14

Regular Season
- Season champions: Prosecco Doc Imoco Volley Conegliano
- Top scorer: Paola Egonu

Finals
- Champions: Prosecco Doc Imoco Volley Conegliano
- Runners-up: Vero Volley Monza
- Finals MVP: Paola Egonu

Italian Women's Volleyball League seasons
- ← 2020–21 2022–23 →

The 2021–22 Serie A1 was the 77th season of the highest professional Italian Women's Volleyball League. The season took place from October to May and was contested by fourteen teams.

== Format ==
The regular season consists of 26 rounds, where the fourteen participating teams play each other twice (once home and once away). At the completion of the regular season, the eight best teams advance to the championship playoffs and the teams finishing 13th and 14th are relegated to Serie A2.

The standings criteria:

- highest number of result points (points awarded for results: 3 points for 3–0 or 3–1 wins, 2 points for 3–2 win, 1 point for 2–3 loss);
- highest number of matches won;
- highest set quotient (the number of total sets won divided by the number of total sets lost);
- highest points quotient (the number of total points scored divided by the number of total points conceded).

== Teams ==
Club	Venue	Capacity	City/Area	Club locations in Italy (2021–22 season).
Acqua & Sapone Roma Volley Club	PalaLottomatica	11,200	Rome	Club locations in Italy (2021–22 season).
Bartoccini Fortinfissi Perugia	PalaBarton	4,000	Perugia	Club locations in Italy (2021–22 season).
Bosca S.Bernardo Cuneo	PalaCastagnaretta	4,700	Cuneo	Club locations in Italy (2021–22 season).
Delta Despar Trentino	Il T Quotidiano Arena	4,000	Trento	Club locations in Italy (2021–22 season).
Igor Gorgonzola Novara	Pala Igor Gorgonzola	5,000	Novara	Club locations in Italy (2021–22 season).
Il Bisonte Firenze	PalaWanny	5,000	Florence	Club locations in Italy (2021–22 season).
Megabox Ondulati Del Savio Vallefoglia	PalaCarneroli	1,612	Urbino	Club locations in Italy (2021–22 season).
Prosecco Doc Imoco Volley Conegliano	PalaVerde	5,344	Villorba	Club locations in Italy (2021–22 season).
Reale Mutua Fenera Chieri	PalaFenera	1,506	Chieri	Club locations in Italy (2021–22 season).
Savino Del Bene Scandicci	Palazzetto dello Sport	2,000	Scandicci	Club locations in Italy (2021–22 season).
Unet E-Work Busto Arsizio	E-Work Arena	4,490	Busto Arsizio	Club locations in Italy (2021–22 season).
Vbc Trasporti Pesanti Casalmaggiore	PalaRadi	3,519	Cremona	Club locations in Italy (2021–22 season).
Vero Volley Monza	Opiquad Arena	4,500	Monza	Club locations in Italy (2021–22 season).
Volley Bergamo 1991	PalaIntred	2,250	Bergamo	Club locations in Italy (2021–22 season).

== Regular season ==
=== League table ===
Pos	Team	Pld	W	L	Pts	SW	SL	SR	SPW	SPL	SPR	Qualification or relegation
1	Prosecco Doc Imoco Volley Conegliano	26	23	3	66	73	23	3.174	2264	1970	1.149	Championship playoffs
2	Igor Gorgonzola Novara	26	23	3	66	69	24	2.875	2233	1914	1.167	Championship playoffs
3	Vero Volley Monza	26	20	6	63	70	25	2.800	2259	1969	1.147	Championship playoffs
4	Savino Del Bene Scandicci	26	20	6	57	65	33	1.970	2290	2097	1.092	Championship playoffs
5	Unet E-Work Busto Arsizio	26	16	10	51	59	42	1.405	2278	2139	1.065	Championship playoffs
6	Reale Mutua Fenera Chieri	26	13	13	40	52	50	1.040	2308	2258	1.022	Championship playoffs
7	Bosca S.Bernardo Cuneo	26	13	13	38	52	53	0.981	2268	2287	0.992	Championship playoffs
8	Il Bisonte Firenze	26	13	13	38	51	54	0.944	2343	2371	0.988	Championship playoffs
9	Megabox Ondulati Del Savio Vallefoglia	26	8	18	25	35	61	0.574	2055	2213	0.929	
10	Bartoccini Fortinfissi Perugia	26	7	19	22	35	63	0.556	2076	2261	0.918	
11	Vbc Trasporti Pesanti Casalmaggiore	26	7	19	22	32	64	0.500	1976	2240	0.882	
12	Volley Bergamo 1991	26	7	19	20	36	65	0.554	2163	2362	0.916	
13	Acqua & Sapone Roma Volley Club	26	7	19	19	31	67	0.463	2086	2286	0.913	Relegated to Serie A2
14	Delta Despar Trentino	26	5	21	19	30	66	0.455	1951	2183	0.894	Relegated to Serie A2

Source: Lega Volley Femminile

=== Results table ===
Home \ Away	ROM	PER	CUN	TRE	NOV	FIR	VAL	CON	CHI	SCA	BUS	CAS	MON	BER
Acqua & Sapone Roma Volley Club		1–3	2–3	0–3	1–3	3–1	1–3	0–3	3–1	1–3	2–3	1–3	0–3	3–2
Bartoccini Fortinfissi Perugia	3–0		1–3	3–2	0–3	1–3	3–1	0–3	1–3	0–3	1–3	3–0	1–3	2–3
Bosca S.Bernardo Cuneo	0–3	3–2		3–2	0–3	3–0	3–0	2–3	3–2	0–3	3–2	3–0	2–3	3–0
Delta Despar Trentino	3–0	0–3	2–3		1–3	1–3	0–3	0–3	1–3	0–3	2–3	0–3	0–3	3–0
Igor Gorgonzola Novara	3–0	3–0	3–1	3–0		3–0	3–0	3–1	3–2	0–3	3–1	3–0	3–1	3–1
Il Bisonte Firenze	2–3	3–0	3–1	3–1	1–3		3–2	1–3	3–1	1–3	1–3	3–0	3–2	3–1
Megabox Ondulati Del Savio Vallefoglia	2–3	3–1	0–3	3–2	1–3	1–3		2–3	3–1	0–3	1–3	3–0	0–3	3–0
Prosecco Doc Imoco Volley Conegliano	3–0	3–0	3–1	3–0	3–0	2–3	3–0		3–1	3–1	3–2	3–0	1–3	3–1
Reale Mutua Fenera Chieri	3–0	3–1	3–2	3–1	0–3	3–2	3–0	0–3		2–3	3–0	3–0	0–3	3–1
Savino Del Bene Scandicci	3–1	3–2	3–2	3–0	3–0	3–1	2–3	1–3	3–1		3–0	3–0	1–3	3–1
Unet E-Work Busto Arsizio	3–0	3–0	3–0	3–0	2–3	3–0	3–0	0–3	3–1	2–3		2–3	3–1	3–1
Vbc Trasporti Pesanti Casalmaggiore	2–3	2–3	1–3	2–3	0–3	2–3	3–0	0–3	1–3	3–0	1–3		3–2	0–3
Vero Volley Monza	3–0	3–0	3–0	3–0	2–3	3–0	3–0	2–3	3–1	3–0	3–0	3–0		3–1
Volley Bergamo 1991	3–0	3–1	3–2	1–3	0–3	3–2	3–1	0–3	1–3	1–3	1–3	2–3	0–3	

Source: Lega Volley Femminile
Legend: Blue = left column team win; Red = top row team win.

=== Fixtures and results ===
- All times are local, CEST (UTC+02:00) between 9 October and 30 October 2021, CET (UTC+01:00) between 31 October 2021 and 26 March 2022 and CEST (UTC+02:00) from 27 March 2022.

Round 1

Date	Time		Score		Set 1	Set 2	Set 3	Set 4	Set 5	Total	Report
9 Oct	20:30	Unet E-Work Busto Arsizio	3–1	Vero Volley Monza	15–25	25–21	25–21	25–23		90–90	Report
10 Oct	17:00	Reale Mutua Fenera Chieri	3–1	Bartoccini Fortinfissi Perugia	25–15	22–25	25–19	25–22		97–81	Report
10 Oct	17:00	Bosca S.Bernardo Cuneo	0–3	Acqua & Sapone Roma Volley Club	20–25	21–25	24–26			65–76	Report
10 Oct	17:00	Igor Gorgonzola Novara	3–0	Il Bisonte Firenze	25–22	25–22	25–19			75–63	Report
10 Oct	17:00	Vbc Trasporti Pesanti Casalmaggiore	3–0	Savino Del Bene Scandicci	25–22	25–23	27–25			77–70	Report
10 Oct	17:00	Volley Bergamo 1991	1–3	Delta Despar Trentino	25–23	23–25	18–25	18–25		84–98	Report
10 Oct	20:30	Prosecco Doc Imoco Volley Conegliano	3–0	Megabox Ondulati Del Savio Vallefoglia	25–17	25–23	27–25			77–65	Report

Round 2

Date	Time		Score		Set 1	Set 2	Set 3	Set 4	Set 5	Total	Report
16 Oct	20:30	Savino Del Bene Scandicci	3–1	Volley Bergamo 1991	25–15	26–24	20–25	25–15		96–79	Report
17 Oct	17:00	Igor Gorgonzola Novara	3–0	Vbc Trasporti Pesanti Casalmaggiore	25–18	25–21	25–11			75–50	Report
17 Oct	17:00	Vero Volley Monza	3–1	Reale Mutua Fenera Chieri	25–27	25–15	25–20	25–13		100–75	Report
17 Oct	17:00	Bartoccini Fortinfissi Perugia	1–3	Il Bisonte Firenze	26–24	21–25	21–25	23–25		91–99	Report
17 Oct	17:00	Acqua & Sapone Roma Volley Club	0–3	Prosecco Doc Imoco Volley Conegliano	21–25	15–25	24–26			60–76	Report
17 Oct	17:00	Megabox Ondulati Del Savio Vallefoglia	1–3	Unet E-Work Busto Arsizio	17–25	25–20	20–25	18–25		80–95	Report
17 Oct	20:30	Delta Despar Trentino	2–3	Bosca S.Bernardo Cuneo	16–25	25–17	25–21	16–25	4–15	86–103	Report

Round 3

Date	Time		Score		Set 1	Set 2	Set 3	Set 4	Set 5	Total	Report
20 Oct	19:30	Acqua & Sapone Roma Volley Club	1–3	Vbc Trasporti Pesanti Casalmaggiore	24–26	18–25	25–23	21–25		88–99	Report
20 Oct	19:30	Megabox Ondulati Del Savio Vallefoglia	3–1	Reale Mutua Fenera Chieri	25–23	16–25	25–23	25–17		91–88	Report
20 Oct	20:30	Il Bisonte Firenze	3–1	Delta Despar Trentino	25–13	17–25	25–16	25–19		92–73	Report
20 Oct	20:30	Bosca S.Bernardo Cuneo	0–3	Savino Del Bene Scandicci	24–26	23–25	21–25			68–76	Report
20 Oct	20:30	Volley Bergamo 1991	0–3	Vero Volley Monza	21–25	23–25	15–25			59–75	Report
20 Oct	20:45	Unet E-Work Busto Arsizio	3–0	Bartoccini Fortinfissi Perugia	25–21	25–15	25–19			75–55	Report
21 Oct	20:30	Prosecco Doc Imoco Volley Conegliano	3–0	Igor Gorgonzola Novara	25–22	30–28	25–23			80–73	Report

Round 4

Date	Time		Score		Set 1	Set 2	Set 3	Set 4	Set 5	Total	Report
23 Oct	17:00	Il Bisonte Firenze	3–1	Bosca S.Bernardo Cuneo	23–25	25–16	25–23	25–18		98–82	Report
23 Oct	20:45	Bartoccini Fortinfissi Perugia	3–0	Acqua & Sapone Roma Volley Club	25–19	26–24	25–22			76–65	Report
24 Oct	17:00	Reale Mutua Fenera Chieri	3–0	Unet E-Work Busto Arsizio	25–20	25–19	26–24			76–63	Report
24 Oct	17:00	Savino Del Bene Scandicci	3–0	Delta Despar Trentino	25–22	25–20	25–19			75–61	Report
24 Oct	17:00	Vbc Trasporti Pesanti Casalmaggiore	0–3	Prosecco Doc Imoco Volley Conegliano	15–25	23–25	23–25			61–75	Report
24 Oct	17:00	Volley Bergamo 1991	3–1	Megabox Ondulati Del Savio Vallefoglia	27–25	25–19	22–25	25–16		99–85	Report
24 Oct	20:30	Vero Volley Monza	2–3	Igor Gorgonzola Novara	35–33	22–25	18–25	25–20	4–15	104–118	Report

Round 5

Date	Time		Score		Set 1	Set 2	Set 3	Set 4	Set 5	Total	Report
30 Oct	20:30	Vero Volley Monza	2–3	Prosecco Doc Imoco Volley Conegliano	25–14	20–25	27–25	20–25	13–15	105–104	Report
30 Oct	20:30	Delta Despar Trentino	1–3	Reale Mutua Fenera Chieri	32–30	19–25	22–25	13–25		86–105	Report
31 Oct	17:00	Igor Gorgonzola Novara	3–0	Bartoccini Fortinfissi Perugia	25–22	25–22	25–15			75–59	Report
31 Oct	17:00	Unet E-Work Busto Arsizio	2–3	Savino Del Bene Scandicci	21–25	25–23	25–16	18–25	12–15	101–104	Report
31 Oct	17:00	Vbc Trasporti Pesanti Casalmaggiore	0–3	Volley Bergamo 1991	20–25	15–25	22–25			57–75	Report
31 Oct	17:00	Bosca S.Bernardo Cuneo	3–0	Megabox Ondulati Del Savio Vallefoglia	25–21	25–18	25–23			75–62	Report
1 Nov	20:30	Acqua & Sapone Roma Volley Club	3–1	Il Bisonte Firenze	19–25	25–23	25–20	25–17		94–85	Report

Round 6

Date	Time		Score		Set 1	Set 2	Set 3	Set 4	Set 5	Total	Report
6 Nov	17:00	Il Bisonte Firenze	3–0	Vbc Trasporti Pesanti Casalmaggiore	25–17	25–18	27–25			77–60	Report
6 Nov	18:00	Prosecco Doc Imoco Volley Conegliano	3–2	Unet E-Work Busto Arsizio	25–21	20–25	21–25	25–23	15–11	106–105	Report
6 Nov	18:30	Bartoccini Fortinfissi Perugia	2–3	Volley Bergamo 1991	23–25	25–20	25–21	22–25	6–15	101–106	Report
6 Nov	20:30	Reale Mutua Fenera Chieri	3–0	Acqua & Sapone Roma Volley Club	25–20	25–20	25–17			75–57	Report
7 Nov	17:00	Savino Del Bene Scandicci	1–3	Vero Volley Monza	14–25	25–14	24–26	18–25		81–90	Report
7 Nov	17:00	Megabox Ondulati Del Savio Vallefoglia	3–2	Delta Despar Trentino	17–25	18–25	27–25	25–16	23–21	110–112	Report
7 Nov	19:30	Igor Gorgonzola Novara	3–1	Bosca S.Bernardo Cuneo	26–24	25–14	22–25	25–22		98–85	Report

Round 7

Date	Time		Score		Set 1	Set 2	Set 3	Set 4	Set 5	Total	Report
13 Nov	19:30	Delta Despar Trentino	0–3	Bartoccini Fortinfissi Perugia	18–25	21–25	19–25			58–75	Report
13 Nov	20:30	Vbc Trasporti Pesanti Casalmaggiore	3–0	Megabox Ondulati Del Savio Vallefoglia	25–23	25–22	25–22			75–67	Report
14 Nov	17:00	Unet E-Work Busto Arsizio	3–0	Il Bisonte Firenze	25–21	25–20	25–20			75–61	Report
14 Nov	17:00	Savino Del Bene Scandicci	3–1	Reale Mutua Fenera Chieri	26–24	25–20	18–25	25–16		94–85	Report
14 Nov	17:00	Bosca S.Bernardo Cuneo	2–3	Prosecco Doc Imoco Volley Conegliano	25–22	15–25	25–20	18–25	8–15	91–107	Report
14 Nov	17:00	Acqua & Sapone Roma Volley Club	0–3	Vero Volley Monza	22–25	18–25	22–25			62–75	Report
14 Nov	19:30	Volley Bergamo 1991	0–3	Igor Gorgonzola Novara	15–25	18–25	20–25			53–75	Report

Round 8

Date	Time		Score		Set 1	Set 2	Set 3	Set 4	Set 5	Total	Report
20 Nov	20:30	Vero Volley Monza	3–0	Vbc Trasporti Pesanti Casalmaggiore	25–20	25–17	25–18			75–55	Report
21 Nov	17:00	Prosecco Doc Imoco Volley Conegliano	3–0	Delta Despar Trentino	25–13	25–11	25–20			75–44	Report
21 Nov	17:00	Igor Gorgonzola Novara	3–0	Acqua & Sapone Roma Volley Club	25–23	25–22	25–18			75–63	Report
21 Nov	17:00	Il Bisonte Firenze	3–2	Megabox Ondulati Del Savio Vallefoglia	15–25	21–25	25–13	26–24	15–11	102–98	Report
21 Nov	17:00	Bartoccini Fortinfissi Perugia	0–3	Savino Del Bene Scandicci	21–25	22–25	22–25			65–75	Report
21 Nov	17:00	Volley Bergamo 1991	1–3	Unet E-Work Busto Arsizio	25–22	20–25	23–25	15–25		83–97	Report
21 Nov	19:30	Reale Mutua Fenera Chieri	3–2	Bosca S.Bernardo Cuneo	25–18	14–25	25–22	23–25	15–11	102–101	Report

Round 9

Date	Time		Score		Set 1	Set 2	Set 3	Set 4	Set 5	Total	Report
27 Nov	20:30	Acqua & Sapone Roma Volley Club	3–2	Volley Bergamo 1991	20–25	25–14	14–25	25–14	15–13	99–91	Report
28 Nov	17:00	Unet E-Work Busto Arsizio	2–3	Igor Gorgonzola Novara	19–25	25–21	25–11	23–25	13–15	105–97	Report
28 Nov	17:00	Reale Mutua Fenera Chieri	3–2	Il Bisonte Firenze	25–19	25–21	19–25	23–25	15–8	107–98	Report
28 Nov	17:00	Bosca S.Bernardo Cuneo	2–3	Vero Volley Monza	25–23	19–25	11–25	25–22	12–15	92–110	Report
28 Nov	17:00	Delta Despar Trentino	0–3	Vbc Trasporti Pesanti Casalmaggiore	20–25	16–25	21–25			57–75	Report
28 Nov	17:00	Megabox Ondulati Del Savio Vallefoglia	3–1	Bartoccini Fortinfissi Perugia	22–25	25–22	25–22	25–21		97–90	Report
28 Nov	19:30	Savino Del Bene Scandicci	1–3	Prosecco Doc Imoco Volley Conegliano	25–23	24–26	19–25	21–25		89–99	Report

Round 10

Date	Time		Score		Set 1	Set 2	Set 3	Set 4	Set 5	Total	Report
4 Dec	18:00	Prosecco Doc Imoco Volley Conegliano	3–0	Bartoccini Fortinfissi Perugia	25–13	25–23	25–13			75–49	Report
4 Dec	19:00	Igor Gorgonzola Novara	3–0	Megabox Ondulati Del Savio Vallefoglia	27–25	25–16	25–17			77–58	Report
4 Dec	20:30	Volley Bergamo 1991	1–3	Reale Mutua Fenera Chieri	25–23	20–25	29–31	19–25		93–104	Report
5 Dec	17:00	Vero Volley Monza	3–0	Il Bisonte Firenze	25–18	25–22	25–17			75–57	Report
5 Dec	17:00	Vbc Trasporti Pesanti Casalmaggiore	1–3	Bosca S.Bernardo Cuneo	24–26	26–24	17–25	23–25		90–100	Report
5 Dec	17:00	Acqua & Sapone Roma Volley Club	1–3	Savino Del Bene Scandicci	21–25	23–25	25–18	27–29		96–97	Report
5 Dec	19:30	Delta Despar Trentino	2–3	Unet E-Work Busto Arsizio	25–18	25–16	16–25	16–25	11–15	93–99	Report

Round 11

Date	Time		Score		Set 1	Set 2	Set 3	Set 4	Set 5	Total	Report
11 Dec	20:30	Megabox Ondulati Del Savio Vallefoglia	0–3	Savino Del Bene Scandicci	21–25	16–25	14–25			51–75	Report
12 Dec	17:00	Igor Gorgonzola Novara	3–0	Delta Despar Trentino	25–16	25–19	25–13			75–48	Report
12 Dec	17:00	Unet E-Work Busto Arsizio	3–0	Acqua & Sapone Roma Volley Club	25–22	25–17	25–23			75–62	Report
12 Dec	17:00	Reale Mutua Fenera Chieri	3–0	Vbc Trasporti Pesanti Casalmaggiore	25–21	25–16	25–22			75–59	Report
12 Dec	19:30	Bosca S.Bernardo Cuneo	3–0	Volley Bergamo 1991	25–19	25–21	25–19			75–59	Report
13 Dec	20:30	Bartoccini Fortinfissi Perugia	1–3	Vero Volley Monza	30–28	17–25	26–28	14–25		87–106	Report
20 Mar	20:00	Il Bisonte Firenze	1–3	Prosecco Doc Imoco Volley Conegliano	25–19	19–25	21–25	16–25		81–94	Report

Round 12

Date	Time		Score		Set 1	Set 2	Set 3	Set 4	Set 5	Total	Report
10 Nov	20:30	Reale Mutua Fenera Chieri	0–3	Prosecco Doc Imoco Volley Conegliano	22–25	22–25	22–25			66–75	Report
18 Dec	17:00	Megabox Ondulati Del Savio Vallefoglia	0–3	Vero Volley Monza	23–25	21–25	22–25			66–75	Report
18 Dec	19:30	Delta Despar Trentino	3–0	Acqua & Sapone Roma Volley Club	25–23	25–15	25–22			75–60	Report
18 Dec	20:30	Bosca S.Bernardo Cuneo	3–2	Bartoccini Fortinfissi Perugia	22–25	25–22	20–25	25–20	15–11	107–103	Report
19 Dec	17:00	Savino Del Bene Scandicci	3–0	Igor Gorgonzola Novara	25–17	25–21	25–22			75–60	Report
19 Dec	19:30	Vbc Trasporti Pesanti Casalmaggiore	1–3	Unet E-Work Busto Arsizio	14–25	25–22	16–25	19–25		74–97	Report
9 Mar	20:30	Volley Bergamo 1991	3–2	Il Bisonte Firenze	26–24	25–20	27–29	19–25	16–14	113–112	Report

Round 13

Date	Time		Score		Set 1	Set 2	Set 3	Set 4	Set 5	Total	Report
25 Jan	18:00	Vero Volley Monza	3–0	Delta Despar Trentino	25–20	25–18	25–19			75–57	Report
16 Feb	19:30	Il Bisonte Firenze	1–3	Savino Del Bene Scandicci	17–25	25–20	17–25	27–29		86–99	Report
16 Feb	20:30	Unet E-Work Busto Arsizio	3–0	Bosca S.Bernardo Cuneo	25–23	25–16	25–12			75–51	Report
17 Mar	20:30	Bartoccini Fortinfissi Perugia	3–0	Vbc Trasporti Pesanti Casalmaggiore	25–22	25–19	25–16			75–57	Report
23 Mar	20:00	Igor Gorgonzola Novara	3–2	Reale Mutua Fenera Chieri	20–25	30–28	25–21	22–25	15–12	112–111	Report
23 Mar	20:30	Prosecco Doc Imoco Volley Conegliano	3–1	Volley Bergamo 1991	20–25	25–20	25–17	25–22		95–84	Report
30 Mar	19:30	Acqua & Sapone Roma Volley Club	1–3	Megabox Ondulati Del Savio Vallefoglia	25–21	19–25	22–25	23–25		89–96	Report

Round 14

Date	Time		Score		Set 1	Set 2	Set 3	Set 4	Set 5	Total	Report
9 Jan	18:00	Vero Volley Monza	3–0	Unet E-Work Busto Arsizio	25–21	25–19	25–16			75–56	Report
19 Jan	18:00	Savino Del Bene Scandicci	3–0	Vbc Trasporti Pesanti Casalmaggiore	25–20	25–19	25–15			75–54	Report
23 Feb	19:30	Megabox Ondulati Del Savio Vallefoglia	2–3	Prosecco Doc Imoco Volley Conegliano	25–23	13–25	19–25	25–21	11–15	93–109	Report
23 Feb	20:30	Delta Despar Trentino	3–0	Volley Bergamo 1991	25–17	25–20	25–16			75–53	Report
24 Feb	20:30	Il Bisonte Firenze	1–3	Igor Gorgonzola Novara	19–25	25–27	31–29	22–25		97–106	Report
2 Mar	19:30	Acqua & Sapone Roma Volley Club	2–3	Bosca S.Bernardo Cuneo	21–25	26–24	25–22	17–25	14–16	103–112	Report
9 Mar	20:30	Bartoccini Fortinfissi Perugia	1–3	Reale Mutua Fenera Chieri	20–25	25–22	6–25	17–25		68–97	Report

Round 15

Date	Time		Score		Set 1	Set 2	Set 3	Set 4	Set 5	Total	Report
15 Jan	20:45	Vbc Trasporti Pesanti Casalmaggiore	0–3	Igor Gorgonzola Novara	18–25	20–25	12–25			50–75	Report
16 Jan	17:00	Volley Bergamo 1991	1–3	Savino Del Bene Scandicci	25–23	23–25	19–25	14–25		81–98	Report
16 Jan	17:00	Bosca S.Bernardo Cuneo	3–2	Delta Despar Trentino	18–25	25–19	17–25	25–19	15–8	100–96	Report
16 Jan	17:00	Unet E-Work Busto Arsizio	3–0	Megabox Ondulati Del Savio Vallefoglia	25–16	25–23	25–19			75–58	Report
16 Jan	19:30	Prosecco Doc Imoco Volley Conegliano	3–0	Acqua & Sapone Roma Volley Club	25–16	25–21	25–17			75–54	Report
23 Feb	19:00	Reale Mutua Fenera Chieri	0–3	Vero Volley Monza	23–25	20–25	22–25			65–75	Report
23 Mar	20:30	Il Bisonte Firenze	3–0	Bartoccini Fortinfissi Perugia	26–24	25–23	25–18			76–65	Report

Round 16

Date	Time		Score		Set 1	Set 2	Set 3	Set 4	Set 5	Total	Report
22 Jan	19:00	Vbc Trasporti Pesanti Casalmaggiore	2–3	Acqua & Sapone Roma Volley Club	25–22	29–31	25–18	19–25	9–15	107–111	Report
22 Jan	20:00	Delta Despar Trentino	1–3	Il Bisonte Firenze	16–25	27–29	25–11	22–25		90–90	Report
22 Jan	20:30	Bartoccini Fortinfissi Perugia	1–3	Unet E-Work Busto Arsizio	25–19	21–25	18–25	23–25		87–94	Report
23 Jan	17:00	Reale Mutua Fenera Chieri	3–0	Megabox Ondulati Del Savio Vallefoglia	25–19	25–18	25–22			75–59	Report
23 Jan	17:00	Vero Volley Monza	3–1	Volley Bergamo 1991	21–25	25–18	25–20	25–19		96–82	Report
23 Jan	18:15	Savino Del Bene Scandicci	3–2	Bosca S.Bernardo Cuneo	16–25	22–25	25–21	25–19	15–9	103–99	Report
3 Mar	20:00	Igor Gorgonzola Novara	3–1	Prosecco Doc Imoco Volley Conegliano	25–19	25–21	23–25	25–19		98–84	Report

Round 17

Date	Time		Score		Set 1	Set 2	Set 3	Set 4	Set 5	Total	Report
29 Jan	19:30	Delta Despar Trentino	0–3	Savino Del Bene Scandicci	20–25	15–25	18–25			53–75	Report
29 Jan	20:30	Bosca S.Bernardo Cuneo	3–0	Il Bisonte Firenze	31–29	25–13	26–24			82–66	Report
30 Jan	17:00	Unet E-Work Busto Arsizio	3–1	Reale Mutua Fenera Chieri	30–28	23–25	25–14	25–16		103–83	Report
30 Jan	17:00	Acqua & Sapone Roma Volley Club	1–3	Bartoccini Fortinfissi Perugia	25–17	29–31	19–25	22–25		95–98	Report
30 Jan	17:00	Prosecco Doc Imoco Volley Conegliano	3–0	Vbc Trasporti Pesanti Casalmaggiore	25–16	25–23	25–18			75–57	Report
30 Jan	19:30	Megabox Ondulati Del Savio Vallefoglia	3–0	Volley Bergamo 1991	25–23	29–27	25–21			79–71	Report
9 Feb	20:45	Igor Gorgonzola Novara	3–1	Vero Volley Monza	20–25	25–17	25–14	25–21		95–77	Report

Round 18

Date	Time		Score		Set 1	Set 2	Set 3	Set 4	Set 5	Total	Report
5 Feb	20:30	Il Bisonte Firenze	2–3	Acqua & Sapone Roma Volley Club	25–20	22–25	25–21	21–25	12–15	105–106	Report
6 Feb	17:00	Savino Del Bene Scandicci	3–0	Unet E-Work Busto Arsizio	29–27	25–20	25–15			79–62	Report
6 Feb	17:00	Reale Mutua Fenera Chieri	3–1	Delta Despar Trentino	22–25	25–22	25–18	25–23		97–88	Report
6 Feb	17:00	Volley Bergamo 1991	2–3	Vbc Trasporti Pesanti Casalmaggiore	25–23	25–22	24–26	22–25	12–15	108–111	Report
6 Feb	17:00	Megabox Ondulati Del Savio Vallefoglia	0–3	Bosca S.Bernardo Cuneo	20–25	23–25	21–25			64–75	Report
6 Feb	18:15	Prosecco Doc Imoco Volley Conegliano	1–3	Vero Volley Monza	25–23	20–25	25–27	13–25		83–100	Report
31 Mar	18:00	Bartoccini Fortinfissi Perugia	0–3	Igor Gorgonzola Novara	14–25	17–25	17–25			48–75	Report

Round 19

Date	Time		Score		Set 1	Set 2	Set 3	Set 4	Set 5	Total	Report
12 Feb	18:00	Vero Volley Monza	3–0	Savino Del Bene Scandicci	25–20	25–21	31–29			81–70	Report
12 Feb	20:30	Bosca S.Bernardo Cuneo	0–3	Igor Gorgonzola Novara	16–25	23–25	19–25			58–75	Report
12 Feb	20:30	Vbc Trasporti Pesanti Casalmaggiore	2–3	Il Bisonte Firenze	26–24	25–22	20–25	17–25	10–15	98–111	Report
12 Feb	21:00	Unet E-Work Busto Arsizio	0–3	Prosecco Doc Imoco Volley Conegliano	21–25	21–25	23–25			65–75	Report
13 Feb	17:00	Acqua & Sapone Roma Volley Club	3–1	Reale Mutua Fenera Chieri	26–24	26–24	21–25	25–15		98–88	Report
13 Feb	17:00	Volley Bergamo 1991	3–1	Bartoccini Fortinfissi Perugia	25–23	25–18	14–25	25–18		89–84	Report
13 Feb	19:30	Delta Despar Trentino	0–3	Megabox Ondulati Del Savio Vallefoglia	19–25	14–25	19–25			52–75	Report

Round 20

Date	Time		Score		Set 1	Set 2	Set 3	Set 4	Set 5	Total	Report
19 Feb	18:30	Reale Mutua Fenera Chieri	2–3	Savino Del Bene Scandicci	25–19	32–34	20–25	25–19	11–15	113–112	Report
19 Feb	20:45	Bartoccini Fortinfissi Perugia	3–2	Delta Despar Trentino	22–25	24–26	25–20	25–21	15–13	111–105	Report
20 Feb	17:00	Il Bisonte Firenze	1–3	Unet E-Work Busto Arsizio	21–25	25–19	18–25	24–26		88–95	Report
20 Feb	17:00	Prosecco Doc Imoco Volley Conegliano	3–1	Bosca S.Bernardo Cuneo	25–23	25–16	23–25	25–23		98–87	Report
20 Feb	17:00	Vero Volley Monza	3–0	Acqua & Sapone Roma Volley Club	25–19	25–21	25–18			75–58	Report
20 Feb	17:00	Igor Gorgonzola Novara	3–1	Volley Bergamo 1991	25–20	21–25	27–25	25–19		98–89	Report
20 Feb	19:30	Megabox Ondulati Del Savio Vallefoglia	3–0	Vbc Trasporti Pesanti Casalmaggiore	25–15	25–20	25–15			75–50	Report

Round 21

Date	Time		Score		Set 1	Set 2	Set 3	Set 4	Set 5	Total	Report
26 Feb	20:30	Vbc Trasporti Pesanti Casalmaggiore	3–2	Vero Volley Monza	27–25	26–24	18–25	22–25	15–12	108–111	Report
27 Feb	17:00	Delta Despar Trentino	0–3	Prosecco Doc Imoco Volley Conegliano	19–25	18–25	16–25			53–75	Report
27 Feb	17:00	Acqua & Sapone Roma Volley Club	1–3	Igor Gorgonzola Novara	25–22	18–25	21–25	19–25		83–97	Report
27 Feb	17:00	Megabox Ondulati Del Savio Vallefoglia	1–3	Il Bisonte Firenze	25–23	26–28	22–25	13–25		86–101	Report
27 Feb	17:00	Savino Del Bene Scandicci	3–2	Bartoccini Fortinfissi Perugia	25–22	25–23	23–25	20–25	15–9	108–104	Report
27 Feb	17:00	Unet E-Work Busto Arsizio	3–1	Volley Bergamo 1991	23–25	25–23	25–21	25–17		98–86	Report
27 Feb	19:30	Bosca S.Bernardo Cuneo	3–2	Reale Mutua Fenera Chieri	25–18	22–25	25–20	21–25	16–14	109–102	Report

Round 22

Date	Time		Score		Set 1	Set 2	Set 3	Set 4	Set 5	Total	Report
5 Mar	20:45	Vero Volley Monza	3–0	Bosca S.Bernardo Cuneo	25–23	25–21	25–20			75–64	Report
6 Mar	17:00	Igor Gorgonzola Novara	3–1	Unet E-Work Busto Arsizio	25–18	20–25	25–18	25–12		95–73	Report
6 Mar	17:00	Il Bisonte Firenze	3–1	Reale Mutua Fenera Chieri	25–23	25–18	19–25	25–22		94–88	Report
6 Mar	17:00	Vbc Trasporti Pesanti Casalmaggiore	2–3	Delta Despar Trentino	25–18	25–21	22–25	18–25	10–15	100–104	Report
6 Mar	17:00	Volley Bergamo 1991	3–0	Acqua & Sapone Roma Volley Club	25–23	31–29	25–19			81–71	Report
6 Mar	17:00	Bartoccini Fortinfissi Perugia	3–1	Megabox Ondulati Del Savio Vallefoglia	25–14	22–25	25–18	25–23		97–80	Report
6 Mar	19:30	Prosecco Doc Imoco Volley Conegliano	3–1	Savino Del Bene Scandicci	20–25	25–22	25–21	25–22		95–90	Report

Round 23

Date	Time		Score		Set 1	Set 2	Set 3	Set 4	Set 5	Total	Report
12 Mar	20:30	Savino Del Bene Scandicci	3–1	Acqua & Sapone Roma Volley Club	25–19	23–25	25–22	25–18		98–84	Report
13 Mar	17:00	Bartoccini Fortinfissi Perugia	0–3	Prosecco Doc Imoco Volley Conegliano	14–25	18–25	18–25			50–75	Report
13 Mar	17:00	Megabox Ondulati Del Savio Vallefoglia	1–3	Igor Gorgonzola Novara	26–28	25–21	19–25	23–25		93–99	Report
13 Mar	17:00	Il Bisonte Firenze	3–2	Vero Volley Monza	26–24	15–25	25–22	23–25	16–14	105–110	Report
13 Mar	17:00	Unet E-Work Busto Arsizio	3–0	Delta Despar Trentino	25–17	25–22	25–21			75–60	Report
13 Mar	17:00	Bosca S.Bernardo Cuneo	3–0	Vbc Trasporti Pesanti Casalmaggiore	25–15	25–12	25–22			75–49	Report
13 Mar	19:30	Reale Mutua Fenera Chieri	3–1	Volley Bergamo 1991	26–24	25–20	23–25	25–18		99–87	Report

Round 24

Date	Time		Score		Set 1	Set 2	Set 3	Set 4	Set 5	Total	Report
1 Dec	20:30	Prosecco Doc Imoco Volley Conegliano	2–3	Il Bisonte Firenze	22–25	30–28	25–16	25–27	12–15	114–111	Report
19 Mar	17:00	Acqua & Sapone Roma Volley Club	2–3	Unet E-Work Busto Arsizio	19–25	16–25	25–22	26–24	12–15	98–111	Report
19 Mar	20:30	Delta Despar Trentino	1–3	Igor Gorgonzola Novara	25–23	13–25	22–25	21–25		81–98	Report
20 Mar	17:00	Vbc Trasporti Pesanti Casalmaggiore	1–3	Reale Mutua Fenera Chieri	16–25	26–28	25–21	23–25		90–99	Report
20 Mar	17:00	Volley Bergamo 1991	3–2	Bosca S.Bernardo Cuneo	21–25	18–25	27–25	25–15	15–12	106–102	Report
20 Mar	17:00	Vero Volley Monza	3–0	Bartoccini Fortinfissi Perugia	25–18	25–17	25–18			75–53	Report
20 Mar	17:00	Savino Del Bene Scandicci	2–3	Megabox Ondulati Del Savio Vallefoglia	25–22	20–25	25–18	18–25	15–17	103–107	Report

Round 25

Date	Time		Score		Set 1	Set 2	Set 3	Set 4	Set 5	Total	Report
26 Mar	20:30	Bartoccini Fortinfissi Perugia	1–3	Bosca S.Bernardo Cuneo	25–21	23–25	22–25	24–26		94–97	Report
27 Mar	17:00	Prosecco Doc Imoco Volley Conegliano	3–1	Reale Mutua Fenera Chieri	25–21	25–17	15–25	25–21		90–84	Report
27 Mar	17:00	Acqua & Sapone Roma Volley Club	0–3	Delta Despar Trentino	15–25	21–25	16–25			52–75	Report
27 Mar	17:00	Unet E-Work Busto Arsizio	2–3	Vbc Trasporti Pesanti Casalmaggiore	24–26	26–24	25–18	15–25	15–17	105–110	Report
27 Mar	17:00	Vero Volley Monza	3–0	Megabox Ondulati Del Savio Vallefoglia	25–14	25–21	25–21			75–56	Report
27 Mar	17:00	Il Bisonte Firenze	3–1	Volley Bergamo 1991	23–25	31–29	25–20	25–23		104–97	Report
27 Mar	19:30	Igor Gorgonzola Novara	0–3	Savino Del Bene Scandicci	17–25	23–25	22–25			62–75	Report

Round 26

Date	Time		Score		Set 1	Set 2	Set 3	Set 4	Set 5	Total	Report
2 Apr	20:30	Volley Bergamo 1991	0–3	Prosecco Doc Imoco Volley Conegliano	13–25	26–28	16–25			55–78	Report
2 Apr	20:30	Reale Mutua Fenera Chieri	0–3	Igor Gorgonzola Novara	12–25	19–25	21–25			52–75	Report
2 Apr	20:30	Delta Despar Trentino	0–3	Vero Volley Monza	22–25	22–25	27–29			71–79	Report
2 Apr	20:30	Bosca S.Bernardo Cuneo	3–2	Unet E-Work Busto Arsizio	30–28	24–26	19–25	25–22	15–13	113–114	Report
2 Apr	20:30	Savino Del Bene Scandicci	3–1	Il Bisonte Firenze	25–20	23–25	25–19	25–20		98–84	Report
2 Apr	20:30	Vbc Trasporti Pesanti Casalmaggiore	2–3	Bartoccini Fortinfissi Perugia	25–21	15–25	25–21	22–25	16–18	103–110	Report
2 Apr	20:30	Megabox Ondulati Del Savio Vallefoglia	2–3	Acqua & Sapone Roma Volley Club	23–25	25–19	25–18	19–25	12–15	104–102	Report

== Championship playoffs ==
- All times are local, CEST (UTC+02:00).

=== Bracket ===
Quarterfinals
1	Prosecco Doc Imoco Volley Conegliano	3	3
8	Il Bisonte Firenze	1	0
4	Savino Del Bene Scandicci	3	3
5	Unet E-Work Busto Arsizio	0	0
2	Igor Gorgonzola Novara	3	1	3
7	Bosca S.Bernardo Cuneo	0	3	0
3	Vero Volley Monza	3	3
6	Reale Mutua Fenera Chieri	0	1

Semifinals
1	Prosecco Doc Imoco Volley Conegliano	3	3
4	Savino Del Bene Scandicci	0	1
2	Igor Gorgonzola Novara	3	0	2
3	Vero Volley Monza	2	3	3

Finals
1	Prosecco Doc Imoco Volley Conegliano	2	3	3	3
3	Vero Volley Monza	3	2	0	2

=== Quarterfinals ===
==== (1) Prosecco Doc Imoco Volley Conegliano vs. (8) Il Bisonte Firenze ====
Date	Time		Score		Set 1	Set 2	Set 3	Set 4	Set 5	Total	Report
9 Apr	21:00	Prosecco Doc Imoco Volley Conegliano	3–1	Il Bisonte Firenze	22–25	25–21	25–21	25–11		97–78	Report
13 Apr	20:30	Il Bisonte Firenze	0–3	Prosecco Doc Imoco Volley Conegliano	17–25	22–25	23–25			62–75	Report

Prosecco Doc Imoco Volley Conegliano wins series, 2–0.

==== (2) Igor Gorgonzola Novara vs. (7) Bosca S.Bernardo Cuneo ====
Date	Time		Score		Set 1	Set 2	Set 3	Set 4	Set 5	Total	Report
9 Apr	20:30	Igor Gorgonzola Novara	3–0	Bosca S.Bernardo Cuneo	25–19	25–17	25–16			75–52	Report
12 Apr	20:30	Bosca S.Bernardo Cuneo	3–1	Igor Gorgonzola Novara	25–22	22–25	25–21	25–15		97–83	Report
16 Apr	18:00	Igor Gorgonzola Novara	3–0	Bosca S.Bernardo Cuneo	25–23	25–12	25–23			75–58	Report

Igor Gorgonzola Novara wins series, 2–1.

==== (3) Vero Volley Monza vs. (6) Reale Mutua Fenera Chieri ====
Date	Time		Score		Set 1	Set 2	Set 3	Set 4	Set 5	Total	Report
10 Apr	19:30	Vero Volley Monza	3–0	Reale Mutua Fenera Chieri	25–23	25–20	25–13			75–56	Report
13 Apr	20:30	Reale Mutua Fenera Chieri	1–3	Vero Volley Monza	23–25	23–25	25–23	19–25		90–98	Report

Vero Volley Monza wins series, 2–0.

==== (4) Savino Del Bene Scandicci vs. (5) Unet E-Work Busto Arsizio ====
Date	Time		Score		Set 1	Set 2	Set 3	Set 4	Set 5	Total	Report
10 Apr	17:00	Savino Del Bene Scandicci	3–0	Unet E-Work Busto Arsizio	25–20	28–26	25–13			78–59	Report
13 Apr	20:30	Unet E-Work Busto Arsizio	0–3	Savino Del Bene Scandicci	14–25	18–25	15–25			47–75	Report

Savino Del Bene Scandicci wins series, 2–0.

=== Semifinals ===
==== (1) Prosecco Doc Imoco Volley Conegliano vs. (4) Savino Del Bene Scandicci ====
Date	Time		Score		Set 1	Set 2	Set 3	Set 4	Set 5	Total	Report
20 Apr	20:30	Prosecco Doc Imoco Volley Conegliano	3–0	Savino Del Bene Scandicci	25–23	25–21	25–21			75–65	Report
23 Apr	20:45	Savino Del Bene Scandicci	1–3	Prosecco Doc Imoco Volley Conegliano	25–22	22–25	11–25	21–25		79–97	Report

Prosecco Doc Imoco Volley Conegliano wins series, 2–0.

==== (2) Igor Gorgonzola Novara vs. (3) Vero Volley Monza ====
Date	Time		Score		Set 1	Set 2	Set 3	Set 4	Set 5	Total	Report
21 Apr	20:30	Igor Gorgonzola Novara	3–2	Vero Volley Monza	25–22	25–18	29–31	20–25	15–12	114–108	Report
24 Apr	20:15	Vero Volley Monza	3–0	Igor Gorgonzola Novara	29–27	25–17	26–24			80–68	Report
27 Apr	20:30	Igor Gorgonzola Novara	2–3	Vero Volley Monza	26–24	25–21	22–25	23–25	12–15	108–110	Report

Vero Volley Monza wins series, 2–1.

=== Finals ===
==== (1) Prosecco Doc Imoco Volley Conegliano vs. (3) Vero Volley Monza ====
Date	Time		Score		Set 1	Set 2	Set 3	Set 4	Set 5	Total	Report
30 Apr	20:30	Prosecco Doc Imoco Volley Conegliano	2–3	Vero Volley Monza	23–25	25–15	25–19	16–25	13–15	102–99	Report
3 May	20:30	Vero Volley Monza	2–3	Prosecco Doc Imoco Volley Conegliano	25–23	25–23	16–25	20–25	10–15	96–111	Report
7 May	20:45	Prosecco Doc Imoco Volley Conegliano	3–0	Vero Volley Monza	25–23	25–12	25–22			75–57	Report
10 May	20:45	Vero Volley Monza	2–3	Prosecco Doc Imoco Volley Conegliano	20–25	25–23	21–25	25–21	8–15	99–109	Report

Prosecco Doc Imoco Volley Conegliano wins series, 3–1.

== Final standings ==
1st place, gold medalist(s)	Prosecco Doc Imoco Conegliano
2nd place, silver medalist(s)	Vero Volley Monza
	Igor Gorgonzola Novara
	Savino Del Bene Scandicci
	Unet E-Work Busto Arsizio
	Reale Mutua Fenera Chieri

Qualified for 2022–23 CEV Champions League
Qualified for 2022–23 CEV Cup
Qualified for 2022–23 CEV Challenge Cup
Qualified for 2022 WEVZA Cup

2021–22 Italian champions
Prosecco Doc Imoco Volley Conegliano
5th title

Lara Caravello, Kathryn Plummer, Megan Courtney, Božana Butigan, Robin de Kruijf, Raphaela Folie, Loveth Omoruyi, Monica De Gennaro, Hristina Vuchkova, Giorgia Frosini, Giulia Gennari, Joanna Wołosz (C), Miriam Sylla, Paola Egonu, Sarah Fahr
Head coach
Daniele Santarelli
