= 2020–21 Italian Women's Volleyball League =

2020–21 Italian Women's Serie A1
- League: Italian Women's Volleyball League
- Sport: Volleyball
- Duration: 19 September 2020 – 20 April 2021
- Teams: 13

Regular Season
- Season champions: Imoco Volley Conegliano
- Top scorer: Camilla Mingardi

Finals
- Champions: Imoco Volley Conegliano
- Runners-up: Igor Gorgonzola Novara
- Finals MVP: Paola Egonu

Italian Women's Volleyball League seasons
- ← 2019–20 2021–22 →

The 2020–21 Serie A1 was the 76th season of the highest professional Italian Women's Volleyball League. The season took place from September to April and was contested by thirteen teams.

== Format ==
The regular season consists of 26 rounds, where the thirteen participating teams play each other twice (once home and once away). At the completion of the regular season, the twelve best teams advance to the playoffs and the team finishing in 13th is relegated to Serie A2.

The standings criteria are:

- highest number of result points (points awarded for results: 3 points for 3–0 or 3–1 wins, 2 points for 3–2 win, 1 point for 2–3 loss);
- highest number of matches won;
- highest set quotient (the number of total sets won divided by the number of total sets lost);
- highest points quotient (the number of total points scored divided by the number of total points conceded).

== Teams ==
| Club | Venue | Capacity | City/Area | Club locations in Italy (2020–21 season). |
| Banca Valsabbina Millenium Brescia | PalaGeorge | 4,300 | Montichiari | Club locations in Italy (2020–21 season). |
| Bartoccini Fortinfissi Perugia | PalaEvangelisti | 4,000 | Perugia | Club locations in Italy (2020–21 season). |
| Bosca S.Bernardo Cuneo | PalaCastagnaretta | 4,700 | Cuneo | Club locations in Italy (2020–21 season). |
| Delta Despar Trentino | PalaSanbapolis | 500 | Trento | Club locations in Italy (2020–21 season). |
| Igor Gorgonzola Novara | PalaTerdoppio | 5,000 | Novara | Club locations in Italy (2020–21 season). |
| Il Bisonte Firenze | Nelson Mandela Forum | 7,500 | Florence | Club locations in Italy (2020–21 season). |
| Imoco Volley Conegliano | PalaVerde | 5,134 | Villorba | Club locations in Italy (2020–21 season). |
| Saugella Monza | PalaIper | 4,500 | Monza | Club locations in Italy (2020–21 season). |
| Reale Mutua Fenera Chieri | PalaMaddalene | 1,200 | Chieri | Club locations in Italy (2020–21 season). |
| Savino Del Bene Scandicci | Palazzetto dello Sport | 2,000 | Scandicci | Club locations in Italy (2020–21 season). |
| Unet E-Work Busto Arsizio | PalaYamamay | 5,000 | Busto Arsizio | Club locations in Italy (2020–21 season). |
| Vbc Èpiù Casalmaggiore | PalaRadi | 2,918 | Cremona | Club locations in Italy (2020–21 season). |
| Zanetti Bergamo | PalaNorda | 2,250 | Bergamo | Club locations in Italy (2020–21 season). |

== Regular season ==
=== League table ===
| Pos | Team | Pld | W | L | Pts | SW | SL | SR | SPW | SPL | SPR | Qualification or relegation |
|---|---|---|---|---|---|---|---|---|---|---|---|---|
| 1 | Imoco Volley Conegliano | 24 | 24 | 0 | 72 | 72 | 8 | 9.000 | 1987 | 1494 | 1.330 | Playoffs (Quarterfinals) |
| 2 | Igor Gorgonzola Novara | 24 | 19 | 5 | 55 | 59 | 23 | 2.565 | 1965 | 1690 | 1.163 | Playoffs (Quarterfinals) |
| 3 | Saugella Monza | 24 | 19 | 5 | 54 | 59 | 32 | 1.844 | 2109 | 1947 | 1.083 | Playoffs (Quarterfinals) |
| 4 | Unet E-Work Busto Arsizio | 24 | 15 | 9 | 45 | 51 | 37 | 1.378 | 2012 | 1927 | 1.044 | Playoffs (Quarterfinals) |
| 5 | Savino Del Bene Scandicci | 24 | 15 | 9 | 45 | 54 | 40 | 1.350 | 2111 | 2015 | 1.048 | Playoffs |
| 6 | Reale Mutua Fenera Chieri | 24 | 14 | 10 | 44 | 55 | 39 | 1.410 | 2160 | 1995 | 1.083 | Playoffs |
| 7 | Bosca S.Bernardo Cuneo | 24 | 10 | 14 | 25 | 41 | 55 | 0.745 | 2066 | 2195 | 0.941 | Playoffs |
| 8 | Delta Despar Trentino | 24 | 8 | 16 | 24 | 33 | 55 | 0.600 | 1727 | 2012 | 0.858 | Playoffs |
| 9 | Il Bisonte Firenze | 24 | 8 | 16 | 22 | 34 | 57 | 0.596 | 1963 | 2078 | 0.945 | Playoffs |
| 10 | Bartoccini Fortinfissi Perugia | 24 | 8 | 16 | 22 | 32 | 59 | 0.542 | 1935 | 2085 | 0.928 | Playoffs |
| 11 | Vbc Èpiù Casalmaggiore | 24 | 7 | 17 | 22 | 36 | 55 | 0.655 | 1953 | 2058 | 0.949 | Playoffs |
| 12 | Zanetti Bergamo | 24 | 6 | 18 | 21 | 30 | 60 | 0.500 | 1851 | 2117 | 0.874 | Playoffs |
| 13 | Banca Valsabbina Millenium Brescia | 24 | 3 | 21 | 17 | 30 | 66 | 0.455 | 1951 | 2177 | 0.896 | Relegated to Serie A2 |

Source: Lega Pallavolo Serie A Femminile

=== Results table ===
| Home \ Away | PER | CUN | TRE | CHI | NOV | FIR | CON | MON | SCA | BUS | BRE | CAS | BER |
|---|---|---|---|---|---|---|---|---|---|---|---|---|---|
| Bartoccini Fortinfissi Perugia | | 3–1 | 3–1 | 0–3 | 0–3 | 3–1 | 0–3 | 1–3 | 1–3 | 2–3 | 3–1 | 0–3 | 0–3 |
| Bosca S.Bernardo Cuneo | 2–3 | | 3–0 | 3–2 | 1–3 | 3–0 | 1–3 | 3–0 | 1–3 | 3–2 | 3–2 | 3–2 | 1–3 |
| Delta Despar Trentino | 3–0 | 3–0 | | 2–3 | 1–3 | 2–3 | 0–3 | 0–3 | 0–3 | 0–3 | 3–0 | 3–2 | 3–0 |
| Reale Mutua Fenera Chieri | 2–3 | 2–3 | 3–0 | | 0–3 | 3–1 | 1–3 | 3–2 | 3–1 | 2–3 | 3–0 | 3–0 | 3–0 |
| Igor Gorgonzola Novara | 3–0 | 3–1 | 3–0 | 3–0 | | 3–2 | 0–3 | 0–3 | 3–0 | 1–3 | 3–0 | 3–0 | 3–0 |
| Il Bisonte Firenze | 1–3 | 1–3 | 3–2 | 3–1 | 0–3 | | 1–3 | 0–3 | 0–3 | 0–3 | 1–3 | 3–0 | 3–1 |
| Imoco Volley Conegliano | 3–1 | 3–0 | 3–1 | 3–1 | 3–0 | 3–0 | | 3–0 | 3–0 | 3–0 | 3–0 | 3–1 | 3–0 |
| Saugella Monza | 3–1 | 3–1 | 3–0 | 3–2 | 3–1 | 3–1 | 0–3 | | 3–2 | 3–1 | 3–1 | 3–1 | 3–2 |
| Savino Del Bene Scandicci | 3–1 | 3–0 | 3–0 | 2–3 | 2–3 | 3–1 | 0–3 | 1–3 | | 1–3 | 3–2 | 3–1 | 3–0 |
| Unet E-Work Busto Arsizio | 3–0 | 3–1 | 3–0 | 0–3 | 0–3 | 0–3 | 0–3 | 3–0 | 1–3 | | 3–1 | 3–0 | 3–0 |
| Banca Valsabbina Millenium Brescia | 2–3 | 2–3 | 2–3 | 0–3 | 0–3 | 2–3 | 0–3 | 0–3 | 2–3 | 1–3 | | 3–1 | 3–1 |
| Vbc Èpiù Casalmaggiore | 3–0 | 3–0 | 1–3 | 0–3 | 1–3 | 3–0 | 1–3 | 2–3 | 1–3 | 1–3 | 3–2 | | 3–2 |
| Zanetti Bergamo | 3–1 | 3–1 | 2–3 | 1–3 | 0–3 | 1–3 | 0–3 | 0–3 | 2–3 | 3–2 | 3–1 | 0–3 | |

Source: Risultati Regular Season A1 2020
Legend: Blue = left column team win; Yellow = draw; Red = top row team win.

=== Fixtures and results ===
- All times are local, CEST (UTC+02:00) between 19 September and 24 October 2020 and CET (UTC+01:00) from 25 October.

Round 1

| Date | Time | | Score | | Set 1 | Set 2 | Set 3 | Set 4 | Set 5 | Total | Report |
|---|---|---|---|---|---|---|---|---|---|---|---|
| 19 Sep | 20:00 | Bartoccini Fortinfissi Perugia | 0–3 | Reale Mutua Fenera Chieri | 22–25 | 18–25 | 20–25 | | | 60–75 | Report |
| 19 Sep | 20:30 | Saugella Monza | 3–1 | Unet E-Work Busto Arsizio | 25–13 | 25–22 | 21–25 | 25–22 | | 96–82 | Report |
| 20 Sep | 16:00 | Il Bisonte Firenze | 1–3 | Bosca S.Bernardo Cuneo | 23–25 | 25–23 | 21–25 | 21–25 | | 90–98 | Report |
| 20 Sep | 17:00 | Imoco Volley Conegliano | 3–1 | Vbc Èpiù Casalmaggiore | 23–25 | 25–12 | 25–15 | 25–19 | | 98–71 | Report |
| 20 Sep | 17:00 | Zanetti Bergamo | 2–3 | Savino Del Bene Scandicci | 23–25 | 25–22 | 25–19 | 21–25 | 6–15 | 100–106 | Report |
| 20 Sep | 18:00 | Delta Despar Trentino | 3–0 | Banca Valsabbina Millenium Brescia | 25–18 | 26–24 | 25–19 | | | 76–61 | Report |

Round 2

| Date | Time | | Score | | Set 1 | Set 2 | Set 3 | Set 4 | Set 5 | Total | Report |
|---|---|---|---|---|---|---|---|---|---|---|---|
| 26 Sep | 20:30 | Vbc Èpiù Casalmaggiore | 1–3 | Delta Despar Trentino | 24–26 | 25–22 | 21–25 | 24–26 | | 94–99 | Report |
| 27 Sep | 16:00 | Unet E-Work Busto Arsizio | 0–3 | Imoco Volley Conegliano | 21–25 | 20–25 | 23–25 | | | 64–75 | Report |
| 27 Sep | 17:00 | Bosca S.Bernardo Cuneo | 3–0 | Saugella Monza | 25–22 | 31–29 | 25–23 | | | 81–74 | Report |
| 27 Sep | 17:00 | Banca Valsabbina Millenium Brescia | 2–3 | Il Bisonte Firenze | 25–21 | 19–25 | 25–18 | 23–25 | 12–15 | 104–104 | Report |
| 27 Sep | 18:00 | Igor Gorgonzola Novara | 3–0 | Zanetti Bergamo | 27–25 | 25–20 | 25–15 | | | 77–60 | Report |
| 27 Sep | 18:30 | Savino Del Bene Scandicci | 3–1 | Bartoccini Fortinfissi Perugia | 17–25 | 25–20 | 25–22 | 25–22 | | 92–89 | Report |

Round 3

| Date | Time | | Score | | Set 1 | Set 2 | Set 3 | Set 4 | Set 5 | Total | Report |
|---|---|---|---|---|---|---|---|---|---|---|---|
| 3 Oct | 20:30 | Imoco Volley Conegliano | 3–0 | Savino Del Bene Scandicci | 25–18 | 25–16 | 25–21 | | | 75–55 | Report |
| 4 Oct | 17:00 | Unet E-Work Busto Arsizio | 3–0 | Delta Despar Trentino | 25–23 | 25–18 | 25–21 | | | 75–62 | Report |
| 4 Oct | 17:00 | Zanetti Bergamo | 0–3 | Vbc Èpiù Casalmaggiore | 12–25 | 23–25 | 18–25 | | | 53–75 | Report |
| 4 Oct | 17:00 | Bartoccini Fortinfissi Perugia | 3–1 | Bosca S.Bernardo Cuneo | 25–23 | 22–25 | 27–25 | 25–19 | | 99–92 | Report |
| 4 Oct | 18:30 | Reale Mutua Fenera Chieri | 0–3 | Igor Gorgonzola Novara | 20–25 | 20–25 | 16–25 | | | 56–75 | Report |
| 20 Oct | 20:30 | Saugella Monza | 3–1 | Il Bisonte Firenze | 25–20 | 22–25 | 25–15 | 25–22 | | 97–82 | Report |

Round 4

| Date | Time | | Score | | Set 1 | Set 2 | Set 3 | Set 4 | Set 5 | Total | Report |
|---|---|---|---|---|---|---|---|---|---|---|---|
| 10 Oct | 19:00 | Vbc Èpiù Casalmaggiore | 3–0 | Bartoccini Fortinfissi Perugia | 25–17 | 25–20 | 25–17 | | | 75–54 | Report |
| 10 Oct | 20:00 | Saugella Monza | 3–1 | Igor Gorgonzola Novara | 26–24 | 25–21 | 22–25 | 25–20 | | 98–90 | Report |
| 10 Oct | 20:45 | Bosca S.Bernardo Cuneo | 3–2 | Reale Mutua Fenera Chieri | 28–26 | 27–29 | 23–25 | 25–21 | 15–11 | 118–112 | Report |
| 11 Oct | 17:00 | Il Bisonte Firenze | 0–3 | Savino Del Bene Scandicci | 22–25 | 23–25 | 19–25 | | | 64–75 | Report |
| 11 Oct | 17:00 | Banca Valsabbina Millenium Brescia | 0–3 | Imoco Volley Conegliano | 15–25 | 16–25 | 13–25 | | | 44–75 | Report |
| 11 Oct | 17:00 | Delta Despar Trentino | 3–0 | Zanetti Bergamo | 25–20 | 25–21 | 25–15 | | | 75–56 | Report |

Round 5

| Date | Time | | Score | | Set 1 | Set 2 | Set 3 | Set 4 | Set 5 | Total | Report |
|---|---|---|---|---|---|---|---|---|---|---|---|
| 13 Oct | 20:45 | Zanetti Bergamo | 1–3 | Il Bisonte Firenze | 24–26 | 16–25 | 25–21 | 20–25 | | 85–97 | Report |
| 14 Oct | 20:30 | Savino Del Bene Scandicci | 3–1 | Vbc Èpiù Casalmaggiore | 12–25 | 25–22 | 25–19 | 25–19 | | 87–85 | Report |
| 14 Oct | 20:30 | Reale Mutua Fenera Chieri | 3–2 | Saugella Monza | 25–15 | 24–26 | 25–19 | 22–25 | 16–14 | 112–99 | Report |
| 14 Oct | 20:30 | Delta Despar Trentino | 3–0 | Bartoccini Fortinfissi Perugia | 25–23 | 25–21 | 25–19 | | | 75–63 | Report |
| 21 Oct | 20:30 | Banca Valsabbina Millenium Brescia | 1–3 | Unet E-Work Busto Arsizio | 22–25 | 25–23 | 16–25 | 21–25 | | 84–98 | Report |
| 11 Nov | 18:30 | Igor Gorgonzola Novara | 3–1 | Bosca S.Bernardo Cuneo | 23–25 | 25–14 | 27–25 | 25–13 | | 100–77 | Report |

Round 6

| Date | Time | | Score | | Set 1 | Set 2 | Set 3 | Set 4 | Set 5 | Total | Report |
|---|---|---|---|---|---|---|---|---|---|---|---|
| 17 Oct | 20:45 | Igor Gorgonzola Novara | 3–0 | Banca Valsabbina Millenium Brescia | 25–18 | 25–16 | 25–16 | | | 75–50 | Report |
| 18 Oct | 17:00 | Vbc Èpiù Casalmaggiore | 0–3 | Reale Mutua Fenera Chieri | 17–25 | 24–26 | 19–25 | | | 60–76 | Report |
| 18 Oct | 17:00 | Il Bisonte Firenze | 3–2 | Delta Despar Trentino | 16–25 | 25–17 | 22–25 | 25–12 | 15–4 | 103–83 | Report |
| 18 Oct | 17:00 | Bartoccini Fortinfissi Perugia | 0–3 | Imoco Volley Conegliano | 18–25 | 15–25 | 21–25 | | | 54–75 | Report |
| 18 Oct | 17:00 | Unet E-Work Busto Arsizio | 1–3 | Savino Del Bene Scandicci | 23–25 | 33–31 | 18–25 | 21–25 | | 95–106 | Report |
| 18 Nov | 18:30 | Bosca S.Bernardo Cuneo | 1–3 | Zanetti Bergamo | 22–25 | 25–17 | 30–32 | 21–25 | | 98–99 | Report |

Round 7

| Date | Time | | Score | | Set 1 | Set 2 | Set 3 | Set 4 | Set 5 | Total | Report |
|---|---|---|---|---|---|---|---|---|---|---|---|
| 24 Oct | 18:00 | Banca Valsabbina Millenium Brescia | 0–3 | Reale Mutua Fenera Chieri | 22–25 | 19–25 | 20–25 | | | 61–75 | Report |
| 24 Oct | 20:30 | Imoco Volley Conegliano | 3–0 | Saugella Monza | 25–16 | 25–23 | 25–14 | | | 75–53 | Report |
| 24 Oct | 21:00 | Savino Del Bene Scandicci | 2–3 | Igor Gorgonzola Novara | 21–25 | 17–25 | 25–23 | 25–23 | 16–18 | 104–114 | Report |
| 25 Oct | 17:00 | Zanetti Bergamo | 3–1 | Bartoccini Fortinfissi Perugia | 25–17 | 25–20 | 19–25 | 27–25 | | 96–87 | Report |
| 18 Nov | 17:00 | Unet E-Work Busto Arsizio | 0–3 | Il Bisonte Firenze | 15–25 | 18–25 | 20–25 | | | 53–75 | Report |
| 3 Dec | 18:30 | Delta Despar Trentino | 3–0 | Bosca S.Bernardo Cuneo | 25–19 | 25–23 | 25–18 | | | 75–60 | Report |

Round 8

| Date | Time | | Score | | Set 1 | Set 2 | Set 3 | Set 4 | Set 5 | Total | Report |
|---|---|---|---|---|---|---|---|---|---|---|---|
| 28 Oct | 18:00 | Il Bisonte Firenze | 1–3 | Imoco Volley Conegliano | 25–19 | 24–26 | 19–25 | 17–25 | | 85–95 | Report |
| 28 Oct | 19:30 | Saugella Monza | 3–2 | Zanetti Bergamo | 21–25 | 25–14 | 25–21 | 27–29 | 15–10 | 113–99 | Report |
| 28 Oct | 20:30 | Igor Gorgonzola Novara | 3–0 | Vbc Èpiù Casalmaggiore | 25–17 | 25–18 | 25–18 | | | 75–53 | Report |
| 28 Nov | 20:30 | Bosca S.Bernardo Cuneo | 3–2 | Banca Valsabbina Millenium Brescia | 25–20 | 24–26 | 20–25 | 25–18 | 16–14 | 110–103 | Report |
| 28 Nov | 20:30 | Bartoccini Fortinfissi Perugia | 2–3 | Unet E-Work Busto Arsizio | 23–25 | 23–25 | 25–17 | 25–23 | 12–15 | 108–105 | Report |
| 29 Nov | 17:00 | Reale Mutua Fenera Chieri | 3–0 | Delta Despar Trentino | 25–13 | 25–20 | 25–14 | | | 75–47 | Report |

Round 9

| Date | Time | | Score | | Set 1 | Set 2 | Set 3 | Set 4 | Set 5 | Total | Report |
|---|---|---|---|---|---|---|---|---|---|---|---|
| 31 Oct | 17:30 | Reale Mutua Fenera Chieri | 3–1 | Il Bisonte Firenze | 21–25 | 25–22 | 25–18 | 25–19 | | 96–84 | Report |
| 31 Oct | 20:30 | Saugella Monza | 3–2 | Savino Del Bene Scandicci | 25–21 | 22–25 | 25–13 | 19–25 | 15–10 | 106–94 | Report |
| 1 Nov | 17:00 | Imoco Volley Conegliano | 3–0 | Bosca S.Bernardo Cuneo | 25–11 | 25–10 | 25–16 | | | 75–37 | Report |
| 1 Nov | 17:00 | Banca Valsabbina Millenium Brescia | 3–1 | Zanetti Bergamo | 23–25 | 25–15 | 25–21 | 25–16 | | 98–77 | Report |
| 18 Nov | 19:00 | Delta Despar Trentino | 1–3 | Igor Gorgonzola Novara | 25–23 | 14–25 | 17–25 | 22–25 | | 78–98 | Report |
| 9 Feb | 17:00 | Unet E-Work Busto Arsizio | 3–0 | Vbc Èpiù Casalmaggiore | 25–18 | 25–22 | 25–15 | | | 75–55 | Report |

Round 10

| Date | Time | | Score | | Set 1 | Set 2 | Set 3 | Set 4 | Set 5 | Total | Report |
|---|---|---|---|---|---|---|---|---|---|---|---|
| 4 Nov | 19:30 | Zanetti Bergamo | 0–3 | Imoco Volley Conegliano | 14–25 | 19–25 | 17–25 | | | 50–75 | Report |
| 4 Nov | 20:30 | Vbc Èpiù Casalmaggiore | 3–2 | Banca Valsabbina Millenium Brescia | 25–21 | 22–25 | 20–25 | 25–15 | 15–9 | 107–95 | Report |
| 25 Nov | 18:00 | Savino Del Bene Scandicci | 3–0 | Bosca S.Bernardo Cuneo | 25–13 | 25–10 | 25–17 | | | 75–40 | Report |
| 25 Nov | 18:00 | Delta Despar Trentino | 0–3 | Saugella Monza | 18–25 | 18–25 | 23–25 | | | 59–75 | Report |
| 5 Dec | 20:30 | Bartoccini Fortinfissi Perugia | 0–3 | Igor Gorgonzola Novara | 18–25 | 21–25 | 12–25 | | | 51–75 | Report |
| 13 Jan | 18:00 | Unet E-Work Busto Arsizio | 0–3 | Reale Mutua Fenera Chieri | 23–25 | 25–27 | 22–25 | | | 70–77 | Report |

Round 11

| Date | Time | | Score | | Set 1 | Set 2 | Set 3 | Set 4 | Set 5 | Total | Report |
|---|---|---|---|---|---|---|---|---|---|---|---|
| 7 Nov | 20:45 | Vbc Èpiù Casalmaggiore | 2–3 | Saugella Monza | 23–25 | 25–20 | 25–16 | 24–26 | 13–15 | 110–102 | Report |
| 8 Nov | 17:00 | Igor Gorgonzola Novara | 3–2 | Il Bisonte Firenze | 24–26 | 25–20 | 25–14 | 22–25 | 15–13 | 111–98 | Report |
| 8 Nov | 17:00 | Zanetti Bergamo | 3–2 | Unet E-Work Busto Arsizio | 24–26 | 28–26 | 25–23 | 18–25 | 15–10 | 110–110 | Report |
| 8 Nov | 17:00 | Banca Valsabbina Millenium Brescia | 2–3 | Bartoccini Fortinfissi Perugia | 21–25 | 18–25 | 25–19 | 25–17 | 13–15 | 102–101 | Report |
| 9 Nov | 18:30 | Imoco Volley Conegliano | 3–1 | Delta Despar Trentino | 25–9 | 25–17 | 20–25 | 25–17 | | 95–68 | Report |
| 27 Jan | 17:30 | Savino Del Bene Scandicci | 2–3 | Reale Mutua Fenera Chieri | 25–22 | 27–25 | 20–25 | 19–25 | 7–15 | 98–112 | Report |

Round 12

| Date | Time | | Score | | Set 1 | Set 2 | Set 3 | Set 4 | Set 5 | Total | Report |
|---|---|---|---|---|---|---|---|---|---|---|---|
| 14 Nov | 19:00 | Il Bisonte Firenze | 3–0 | Vbc Èpiù Casalmaggiore | 25–12 | 32–30 | 25–21 | | | 82–63 | Report |
| 14 Nov | 20:30 | Igor Gorgonzola Novara | 0–3 | Imoco Volley Conegliano | 18–25 | 14–25 | 16–25 | | | 48–75 | Report |
| 15 Nov | 17:00 | Savino Del Bene Scandicci | 3–2 | Banca Valsabbina Millenium Brescia | 25–13 | 22–25 | 25–18 | 14–25 | 15–13 | 101–94 | Report |
| 15 Nov | 17:00 | Saugella Monza | 3–1 | Bartoccini Fortinfissi Perugia | 26–28 | 25–20 | 25–23 | 25–21 | | 101–92 | Report |
| 15 Nov | 17:00 | Bosca S.Bernardo Cuneo | 3–2 | Unet E-Work Busto Arsizio | 25–23 | 18–25 | 26–24 | 25–27 | 15–10 | 109–109 | Report |
| 5 Dec | 17:00 | Reale Mutua Fenera Chieri | 3–0 | Zanetti Bergamo | 25–17 | 25–17 | 25–17 | | | 75–51 | Report |

Round 13

| Date | Time | | Score | | Set 1 | Set 2 | Set 3 | Set 4 | Set 5 | Total | Report |
|---|---|---|---|---|---|---|---|---|---|---|---|
| 21 Nov | 17:30 | Delta Despar Trentino | 0–3 | Savino Del Bene Scandicci | 21–25 | 27–29 | 21–25 | | | 69–79 | Report |
| 21 Nov | 18:00 | Vbc Èpiù Casalmaggiore | 3–0 | Bosca S.Bernardo Cuneo | 25–22 | 31–29 | 28–26 | | | 84–77 | Report |
| 21 Nov | 18:00 | Banca Valsabbina Millenium Brescia | 0–3 | Saugella Monza | 15–25 | 19–25 | 21–25 | | | 55–75 | Report |
| 21 Nov | 20:30 | Unet E-Work Busto Arsizio | 0–3 | Igor Gorgonzola Novara | 27–29 | 16–25 | 15–25 | | | 58–79 | Report |
| 21 Nov | 20:30 | Bartoccini Fortinfissi Perugia | 3–1 | Il Bisonte Firenze | 26–24 | 16–25 | 29–27 | 25–9 | | 96–85 | Report |
| 24 Nov | 18:30 | Imoco Volley Conegliano | 3–1 | Reale Mutua Fenera Chieri | 25–21 | 24–26 | 25–19 | 25–18 | | 99–84 | Report |

Round 14

| Date | Time | | Score | | Set 1 | Set 2 | Set 3 | Set 4 | Set 5 | Total | Report |
|---|---|---|---|---|---|---|---|---|---|---|---|
| 16 Dec | 17:00 | Bosca S.Bernardo Cuneo | 3–0 | Il Bisonte Firenze | 25–20 | 25–23 | 25–23 | | | 75–66 | Report |
| 16 Dec | 18:00 | Vbc Èpiù Casalmaggiore | 1–3 | Imoco Volley Conegliano | 16–25 | 16–25 | 25–23 | 18–25 | | 75–98 | Report |
| 16 Dec | 20:30 | Banca Valsabbina Millenium Brescia | 2–3 | Delta Despar Trentino | 23–25 | 25–20 | 22–25 | 28–26 | 12–15 | 110–111 | Report |
| 10 Feb | 18:30 | Reale Mutua Fenera Chieri | 2–3 | Bartoccini Fortinfissi Perugia | 23–25 | 25–22 | 26–24 | 22–25 | 11–15 | 107–111 | Report |
| 17 Feb | 17:30 | Savino Del Bene Scandicci | 3–0 | Zanetti Bergamo | 25–15 | 25–19 | 25–20 | | | 75–54 | Report |
| 17 Feb | 18:00 | Unet E-Work Busto Arsizio | 3–0 | Saugella Monza | 25–22 | 25–23 | 25–22 | | | 75–67 | Report |

Round 15

| Date | Time | | Score | | Set 1 | Set 2 | Set 3 | Set 4 | Set 5 | Total | Report |
|---|---|---|---|---|---|---|---|---|---|---|---|
| 23 Dec | 18:00 | Zanetti Bergamo | 0–3 | Igor Gorgonzola Novara | 20–25 | 18–25 | 22–25 | | | 60–75 | Report |
| 24 Dec | 12:30 | Imoco Volley Conegliano | 3–0 | Unet E-Work Busto Arsizio | 25–16 | 25–16 | 28–26 | | | 78–58 | Report |
| 13 Jan | 17:00 | Saugella Monza | 3–1 | Bosca S.Bernardo Cuneo | 25–19 | 25–21 | 22–25 | 25–21 | | 97–86 | Report |
| 20 Jan | 18:00 | Bartoccini Fortinfissi Perugia | 1–3 | Savino Del Bene Scandicci | 16–25 | 25–23 | 18–25 | 21–25 | | 80–98 | Report |
| 18 Feb | 19:00 | Delta Despar Trentino | 3–2 | Vbc Èpiù Casalmaggiore | 16–25 | 25–23 | 12–25 | 25–19 | 15–10 | 93–102 | Report |
| 7 Mar | 17:30 | Il Bisonte Firenze | 1–3 | Banca Valsabbina Millenium Brescia | 25–20 | 20–25 | 23–25 | 21–25 | | 89–95 | Report |

Round 16

| Date | Time | | Score | | Set 1 | Set 2 | Set 3 | Set 4 | Set 5 | Total | Report |
|---|---|---|---|---|---|---|---|---|---|---|---|
| 19 Dec | 20:45 | Igor Gorgonzola Novara | 3–0 | Reale Mutua Fenera Chieri | 25–22 | 26–24 | 25–21 | | | 76–67 | Report |
| 20 Dec | 17:00 | Vbc Èpiù Casalmaggiore | 3–2 | Zanetti Bergamo | 29–27 | 25–19 | 20–25 | 17–25 | 15–9 | 106–105 | Report |
| 13 Jan | 17:30 | Savino Del Bene Scandicci | 0–3 | Imoco Volley Conegliano | 22–25 | 20–25 | 15–25 | | | 57–75 | Report |
| 17 Jan | 17:00 | Il Bisonte Firenze | 0–3 | Saugella Monza | 17–25 | 17–25 | 20–25 | | | 54–75 | Report |
| 28 Jan | 19:00 | Delta Despar Trentino | 0–3 | Unet E-Work Busto Arsizio | 14–25 | 16–25 | 19–25 | | | 49–75 | Report |
| 17 Feb | 17:00 | Bosca S.Bernardo Cuneo | 2–3 | Bartoccini Fortinfissi Perugia | 22–25 | 25–17 | 25–20 | 24–26 | 13–15 | 109–103 | Report |

Round 17

| Date | Time | | Score | | Set 1 | Set 2 | Set 3 | Set 4 | Set 5 | Total | Report |
|---|---|---|---|---|---|---|---|---|---|---|---|
| 26 Dec | 17:00 | Reale Mutua Fenera Chieri | 2–3 | Bosca S.Bernardo Cuneo | 25–20 | 22–25 | 25–22 | 17–25 | 9–15 | 98–107 | Report |
| 29 Dec | 18:00 | Imoco Volley Conegliano | 3–0 | Banca Valsabbina Millenium Brescia | 25–22 | 25–23 | 25–17 | | | 75–62 | Report |
| 20 Jan | 17:30 | Igor Gorgonzola Novara | 0–3 | Saugella Monza | 23–25 | 23–25 | 22–25 | | | 68–75 | Report |
| 3 Feb | 17:00 | Bartoccini Fortinfissi Perugia | 0–3 | Vbc Èpiù Casalmaggiore | 18–25 | 21–25 | 17–25 | | | 56–75 | Report |
| 10 Feb | 17:30 | Savino Del Bene Scandicci | 3–1 | Il Bisonte Firenze | 25–14 | 25–17 | 24–26 | 25–12 | | 99–69 | Report |
| 4 Mar | 17:00 | Zanetti Bergamo | 2–3 | Delta Despar Trentino | 27–25 | 25–21 | 19–25 | 20–25 | 8–15 | 99–111 | Report |

Round 18

| Date | Time | | Score | | Set 1 | Set 2 | Set 3 | Set 4 | Set 5 | Total | Report |
|---|---|---|---|---|---|---|---|---|---|---|---|
| 9 Jan | 21:00 | Vbc Èpiù Casalmaggiore | 1–3 | Savino Del Bene Scandicci | 18–25 | 25–17 | 22–25 | 21–25 | | 86–92 | Report |
| 10 Jan | 17:00 | Unet E-Work Busto Arsizio | 3–1 | Banca Valsabbina Millenium Brescia | 25–18 | 25–23 | 23–25 | 25–21 | | 98–87 | Report |
| 10 Jan | 17:00 | Bosca S.Bernardo Cuneo | 1–3 | Igor Gorgonzola Novara | 25–23 | 16–25 | 28–30 | 14–25 | | 83–103 | Report |
| 10 Jan | 17:00 | Saugella Monza | 3–2 | Reale Mutua Fenera Chieri | 26–24 | 22–25 | 19–25 | 25–21 | 15–13 | 107–108 | Report |
| 10 Jan | 17:00 | Il Bisonte Firenze | 3–1 | Zanetti Bergamo | 25–22 | 25–14 | 24–26 | 25–17 | | 99–79 | Report |
| 7 Mar | 17:00 | Bartoccini Fortinfissi Perugia | 3–1 | Delta Despar Trentino | 21–25 | 25–19 | 25–18 | 25–7 | | 96–69 | Report |

Round 19

| Date | Time | | Score | | Set 1 | Set 2 | Set 3 | Set 4 | Set 5 | Total | Report |
|---|---|---|---|---|---|---|---|---|---|---|---|
| 16 Jan | 18:00 | Banca Valsabbina Millenium Brescia | 0–3 | Igor Gorgonzola Novara | 19–25 | 19–25 | 16–25 | | | 54–75 | Report |
| 16 Jan | 20:30 | Zanetti Bergamo | 3–1 | Bosca S.Bernardo Cuneo | 22–25 | 25–23 | 25–22 | 25–16 | | 97–86 | Report |
| 17 Jan | 17:00 | Reale Mutua Fenera Chieri | 3–0 | Vbc Èpiù Casalmaggiore | 25–19 | 25–11 | 25–19 | | | 75–49 | Report |
| 17 Jan | 17:00 | Imoco Volley Conegliano | 3–1 | Bartoccini Fortinfissi Perugia | 23–25 | 25–22 | 25–21 | 25–15 | | 98–83 | Report |
| 17 Jan | 17:00 | Savino Del Bene Scandicci | 1–3 | Unet E-Work Busto Arsizio | 27–25 | 17–25 | 20–25 | 23–25 | | 87–100 | Report |
| 21 Feb | 17:00 | Delta Despar Trentino | 2–3 | Il Bisonte Firenze | 15–25 | 25–21 | 31–29 | 26–28 | 8–15 | 105–118 | Report |

Round 20

| Date | Time | | Score | | Set 1 | Set 2 | Set 3 | Set 4 | Set 5 | Total | Report |
|---|---|---|---|---|---|---|---|---|---|---|---|
| 20 Jan | 17:00 | Il Bisonte Firenze | 0–3 | Unet E-Work Busto Arsizio | 19–25 | 20–25 | 21–25 | | | 60–75 | Report |
| 30 Jan | 17:30 | Igor Gorgonzola Novara | 3–0 | Savino Del Bene Scandicci | 25–22 | 25–23 | 25–22 | | | 75–67 | Report |
| 30 Jan | 20:45 | Saugella Monza | 0–3 | Imoco Volley Conegliano | 15–25 | 20–25 | 25–27 | | | 60–77 | Report |
| 31 Jan | 17:00 | Bartoccini Fortinfissi Perugia | 0–3 | Zanetti Bergamo | 20–25 | 20–25 | 18–25 | | | 58–75 | Report |
| 31 Jan | 17:00 | Reale Mutua Fenera Chieri | 3–0 | Banca Valsabbina Millenium Brescia | 25–13 | 25–19 | 25–17 | | | 75–49 | Report |
| 31 Jan | 17:00 | Bosca S.Bernardo Cuneo | 3–0 | Delta Despar Trentino | 25–13 | 25–20 | 25–13 | | | 75–46 | Report |

Round 21

| Date | Time | | Score | | Set 1 | Set 2 | Set 3 | Set 4 | Set 5 | Total | Report |
|---|---|---|---|---|---|---|---|---|---|---|---|
| 5 Jan | 19:00 | Vbc Èpiù Casalmaggiore | 1–3 | Igor Gorgonzola Novara | 19–25 | 12–25 | 25–22 | 25–27 | | 81–99 | Report |
| 6 Jan | 17:00 | Zanetti Bergamo | 0–3 | Saugella Monza | 16–25 | 21–25 | 20–25 | | | 57–75 | Report |
| 6 Jan | 17:00 | Banca Valsabbina Millenium Brescia | 2–3 | Bosca S.Bernardo Cuneo | 25–17 | 20–25 | 25–20 | 23–25 | 7–15 | 100–102 | Report |
| 6 Jan | 17:00 | Unet E-Work Busto Arsizio | 3–0 | Bartoccini Fortinfissi Perugia | 25–20 | 25–18 | 26–24 | | | 76–62 | Report |
| 6 Jan | 17:30 | Imoco Volley Conegliano | 3–0 | Il Bisonte Firenze | 25–20 | 25–18 | 25–11 | | | 75–49 | Report |
| 24 Feb | 18:30 | Delta Despar Trentino | 2–3 | Reale Mutua Fenera Chieri | 25–15 | 12–25 | 15–25 | 25–23 | 8–15 | 85–103 | Report |

Round 22

| Date | Time | | Score | | Set 1 | Set 2 | Set 3 | Set 4 | Set 5 | Total | Report |
|---|---|---|---|---|---|---|---|---|---|---|---|
| 6 Feb | 20:30 | Il Bisonte Firenze | 3–1 | Reale Mutua Fenera Chieri | 23–25 | 25–20 | 25–21 | 26–24 | | 99–90 | Report |
| 7 Feb | 17:00 | Bosca S.Bernardo Cuneo | 1–3 | Imoco Volley Conegliano | 23–25 | 25–21 | 18–25 | 12–25 | | 78–96 | Report |
| 7 Feb | 17:00 | Zanetti Bergamo | 3–1 | Banca Valsabbina Millenium Brescia | 25–23 | 23–25 | 25–23 | 25–21 | | 98–92 | Report |
| 10 Feb | 19:00 | Igor Gorgonzola Novara | 3–0 | Delta Despar Trentino | 25–15 | 25–18 | 25–14 | | | 75–47 | Report |
| 6 Mar | 18:00 | Vbc Èpiù Casalmaggiore | 1–3 | Unet E-Work Busto Arsizio | 22–25 | 25–23 | 20–25 | 19–25 | | 86–98 | Report |
| 7 Mar | 17:00 | Savino Del Bene Scandicci | 1–3 | Saugella Monza | 25–20 | 21–25 | 19–25 | 29–31 | | 94–101 | Report |

Round 23

| Date | Time | | Score | | Set 1 | Set 2 | Set 3 | Set 4 | Set 5 | Total | Report |
|---|---|---|---|---|---|---|---|---|---|---|---|
| 14 Feb | 17:00 | Reale Mutua Fenera Chieri | 2–3 | Unet E-Work Busto Arsizio | 25–15 | 23–25 | 25–21 | 20–25 | 9–15 | 102–101 | Report |
| 14 Feb | 17:00 | Banca Valsabbina Millenium Brescia | 3–1 | Vbc Èpiù Casalmaggiore | 25–20 | 18–25 | 25–23 | 25–19 | | 93–87 | Report |
| 14 Feb | 17:00 | Bosca S.Bernardo Cuneo | 1–3 | Savino Del Bene Scandicci | 23–25 | 19–25 | 25–17 | 13–25 | | 80–92 | Report |
| 14 Feb | 17:00 | Igor Gorgonzola Novara | 3–0 | Bartoccini Fortinfissi Perugia | 25–19 | 27–25 | 25–22 | | | 77–66 | Report |
| 14 Feb | 17:00 | Saugella Monza | 3–0 | Delta Despar Trentino | 25–12 | 25–17 | 25–18 | | | 75–47 | Report |
| 14 Feb | 18:00 | Imoco Volley Conegliano | 3–0 | Zanetti Bergamo | 25–18 | 25–14 | 25–18 | | | 75–50 | Report |

Round 24

| Date | Time | | Score | | Set 1 | Set 2 | Set 3 | Set 4 | Set 5 | Total | Report |
|---|---|---|---|---|---|---|---|---|---|---|---|
| 29 Dec | 17:30 | Il Bisonte Firenze | 0–3 | Igor Gorgonzola Novara | 27–29 | 18–25 | 18–25 | | | 63–79 | Report |
| 23 Jan | 17:00 | Delta Despar Trentino | 0–3 | Imoco Volley Conegliano | 18–25 | 15–25 | 17–25 | | | 50–75 | Report |
| 23 Jan | 17:00 | Saugella Monza | 3–1 | Vbc Èpiù Casalmaggiore | 25–23 | 24–26 | 25–23 | 25–13 | | 99–85 | Report |
| 24 Jan | 17:00 | Reale Mutua Fenera Chieri | 3–1 | Savino Del Bene Scandicci | 22–25 | 34–32 | 25–17 | 25–20 | | 106–94 | Report |
| 24 Jan | 17:00 | Unet E-Work Busto Arsizio | 3–0 | Zanetti Bergamo | 25–16 | 25–18 | 25–15 | | | 75–49 | Report |
| 24 Jan | 17:00 | Bartoccini Fortinfissi Perugia | 3–1 | Banca Valsabbina Millenium Brescia | 25–14 | 25–18 | 14–25 | 25–20 | | 89–77 | Report |

Round 25

| Date | Time | | Score | | Set 1 | Set 2 | Set 3 | Set 4 | Set 5 | Total | Report |
|---|---|---|---|---|---|---|---|---|---|---|---|
| 29 Jan | 18:00 | Vbc Èpiù Casalmaggiore | 3–0 | Il Bisonte Firenze | 25–18 | 29–27 | 25–21 | | | 79–66 | Report |
| 20 Feb | 18:00 | Imoco Volley Conegliano | 3–0 | Igor Gorgonzola Novara | 25–19 | 25–22 | 25–18 | | | 75–59 | Report |
| 20 Feb | 20:30 | Bartoccini Fortinfissi Perugia | 1–3 | Saugella Monza | 20–25 | 25–19 | 23–25 | 13–25 | | 81–94 | Report |
| 21 Feb | 17:00 | Banca Valsabbina Millenium Brescia | 2–3 | Savino Del Bene Scandicci | 14–25 | 26–24 | 25–20 | 21–25 | 12–15 | 98–109 | Report |
| 21 Feb | 17:00 | Zanetti Bergamo | 1–3 | Reale Mutua Fenera Chieri | 18–25 | 31–29 | 20–25 | 23–25 | | 92–104 | Report |
| 21 Feb | 17:00 | Unet E-Work Busto Arsizio | 3–1 | Bosca S.Bernardo Cuneo | 17–25 | 25–18 | 25–19 | 25–15 | | 92–77 | Report |

Round 26

| Date | Time | | Score | | Set 1 | Set 2 | Set 3 | Set 4 | Set 5 | Total | Report |
|---|---|---|---|---|---|---|---|---|---|---|---|
| 27 Feb | 17:00 | Saugella Monza | 3–1 | Banca Valsabbina Millenium Brescia | 25–23 | 20–25 | 25–13 | 25–22 | | 95–83 | Report |
| 27 Feb | 17:30 | Il Bisonte Firenze | 1–3 | Bartoccini Fortinfissi Perugia | 22–25 | 16–25 | 25–21 | 19–25 | | 82–96 | Report |
| 27 Feb | 18:00 | Bosca S.Bernardo Cuneo | 3–2 | Vbc Èpiù Casalmaggiore | 23–25 | 25–19 | 32–30 | 16–25 | 15–11 | 111–110 | Report |
| 27 Feb | 20:30 | Reale Mutua Fenera Chieri | 1–3 | Imoco Volley Conegliano | 23–25 | 25–22 | 23–25 | 29–31 | | 100–103 | Report |
| 28 Feb | 17:00 | Savino Del Bene Scandicci | 3–0 | Delta Despar Trentino | 25–15 | 25–18 | 25–15 | | | 75–48 | Report |
| 28 Feb | 18:00 | Igor Gorgonzola Novara | 1–3 | Unet E-Work Busto Arsizio | 23–25 | 22–25 | 25–19 | 17–25 | | 87–94 | Report |

== Playoffs ==
=== Bracket ===
Round of 16
9 | Firenze | 3 | 3
8 | Trentino | 1 | 2
12 | Bergamo | 0 | 0
5 | Scandicci | 3 | 3
10 | Perugia | 3 | 3
7 | Cuneo | 1 | 0
11 | Casalmaggiore | 0 | 0
6 | Chieri | 3 | 3

Quarterfinals
1 | Imoco | 3 | 3
9 | Firenze | 0 | 0
4 | B. Arsizio | 2 | 2
5 | Scandicci | 3 | 3
2 | Novara | 3 | 3
10 | Perugia | 1 | 1
3 | Monza | 3 | 2 | 3
6 | Chieri | 0 | 3 | 1

Semifinals
1 | Imoco | 3 | 3
5 | Scandicci | 0 | 0
2 | Novara | 3 | 3
3 | Monza | 2 | 1

Finals
1 | Imoco | 3 | 3
2 | Novara | 2 | 1

=== Round of 16 ===
==== (8) Delta Despar Trentino vs. (9) Il Bisonte Firenze ====
| Date | Time | | Score | | Set 1 | Set 2 | Set 3 | Set 4 | Set 5 | Total | Report |
|---|---|---|---|---|---|---|---|---|---|---|---|
| 21 Mar | 17:00 | Il Bisonte Firenze | 3–1 | Delta Despar Trentino | 25–23 | 25–21 | 27–29 | 25–21 | | 102–94 | Report |
| 24 Mar | 18:30 | Delta Despar Trentino | 2–3 | Il Bisonte Firenze | 27–25 | 27–25 | 22–25 | 21–25 | 12–15 | 109–115 | Report |

Il Bisonte Firenze wins series, 2–0.

==== (5) Savino Del Bene Scandicci vs. (12) Zanetti Bergamo ====
| Date | Time | | Score | | Set 1 | Set 2 | Set 3 | Set 4 | Set 5 | Total | Report |
|---|---|---|---|---|---|---|---|---|---|---|---|
| 21 Mar | 17:00 | Zanetti Bergamo | 0–3 | Savino Del Bene Scandicci | 18–25 | 17–25 | 23–25 | | | 58–75 | Report |
| 24 Mar | 17:30 | Savino Del Bene Scandicci | 3–0 | Zanetti Bergamo | 25–16 | 25–13 | 25–20 | | | 75–49 | Report |

Savino Del Bene Scandicci wins series, 2–0.

==== (7) Bosca S.Bernardo Cuneo vs. (10) Bartoccini Fortinfissi Perugia ====
| Date | Time | | Score | | Set 1 | Set 2 | Set 3 | Set 4 | Set 5 | Total | Report |
|---|---|---|---|---|---|---|---|---|---|---|---|
| 20 Mar | 17:00 | Bartoccini Fortinfissi Perugia | 3–1 | Bosca S.Bernardo Cuneo | 27–25 | 22–25 | 25–21 | 25–17 | | 99–88 | Report |
| 24 Mar | 17:00 | Bosca S.Bernardo Cuneo | 0–3 | Bartoccini Fortinfissi Perugia | 18–25 | 17–25 | 11–25 | | | 46–75 | Report |

Bartoccini Fortinfissi Perugia wins series, 2–0.

==== (6) Reale Mutua Fenera Chieri vs. (11) Vbc Èpiù Casalmaggiore ====
| Date | Time | | Score | | Set 1 | Set 2 | Set 3 | Set 4 | Set 5 | Total | Report |
|---|---|---|---|---|---|---|---|---|---|---|---|
| 28 Mar | 17:00 | Vbc Èpiù Casalmaggiore | 0–3 | Reale Mutua Fenera Chieri | 0–25 | 0–25 | 0–25 | | | 0–75 | Report |
| 26 Mar | 19:00 | Reale Mutua Fenera Chieri | 1–3 | Saugella Monza | 25–0 | 25–0 | 25–0 | | | 75–0 | Report |

Reale Mutua Fenera Chieri wins series, 2–0.

=== Quarterfinals ===
==== (1) Imoco Volley Conegliano vs. (9) Il Bisonte Firenze ====
| Date | Time | | Score | | Set 1 | Set 2 | Set 3 | Set 4 | Set 5 | Total | Report |
|---|---|---|---|---|---|---|---|---|---|---|---|
| 27 Mar | 20:30 | Imoco Volley Conegliano | 3–0 | Il Bisonte Firenze | 25–15 | 25–17 | 29–27 | | | 79–59 | Report |
| 30 Mar | 20:30 | Il Bisonte Firenze | 0–3 | Imoco Volley Conegliano | 13–25 | 20–25 | 17–25 | | | 50–75 | Report |

Imoco Volley Conegliano wins series, 2–0.

==== (4) Unet E-Work Busto Arsizio vs. (5) Savino Del Bene Scandicci ====
| Date | Time | | Score | | Set 1 | Set 2 | Set 3 | Set 4 | Set 5 | Total | Report |
|---|---|---|---|---|---|---|---|---|---|---|---|
| 28 Mar | 17:00 | Unet E-Work Busto Arsizio | 2–3 | Savino Del Bene Scandicci | 25–17 | 15–25 | 30–28 | 21–25 | 13–15 | 104–110 | Report |
| 31 Mar | 17:30 | Savino Del Bene Scandicci | 3–2 | Unet E-Work Busto Arsizio | 22–25 | 25–21 | 25–22 | 22–25 | 15–7 | 109–100 | Report |

Savino Del Bene Scandicci wins series, 2–0.

==== (2) Igor Gorgonzola Novara vs. (10) Bartoccini Fortinfissi Perugia ====
| Date | Time | | Score | | Set 1 | Set 2 | Set 3 | Set 4 | Set 5 | Total | Report |
|---|---|---|---|---|---|---|---|---|---|---|---|
| 27 Mar | 20:30 | Igor Gorgonzola Novara | 3–1 | Bartoccini Fortinfissi Perugia | 18–25 | 25–22 | 25–20 | 25–17 | | 93–84 | Report |
| 31 Mar | 18:00 | Bartoccini Fortinfissi Perugia | 1–3 | Igor Gorgonzola Novara | 22–25 | 14–25 | 25–20 | 22–25 | | 83–95 | Report |

Igor Gorgonzola Novara wins series, 2–0.

==== (3) Saugella Monza vs. (6) Reale Mutua Fenera Chieri ====
| Date | Time | | Score | | Set 1 | Set 2 | Set 3 | Set 4 | Set 5 | Total | Report |
|---|---|---|---|---|---|---|---|---|---|---|---|
| 29 Mar | 18:00 | Saugella Monza | 3–0 | Reale Mutua Fenera Chieri | 25–22 | 25–20 | 25–18 | | | 75–60 | Report |
| 1 Apr | 18:30 | Reale Mutua Fenera Chieri | 1–3 | Saugella Monza | 25–23 | 19–25 | 25–20 | 17–25 | 15–11 | 101–104 | Report |
| 4 Apr | 20:45 | Saugella Monza | 3–1 | Reale Mutua Fenera Chieri | 25–19 | 25–22 | 18–25 | 25–15 | | 93–81 | Report |

Saugella Monza wins series, 2–1.

=== Semifinals ===
==== (1) Imoco Volley Conegliano vs. (5) Savino Del Bene Scandicci ====
| Date | Time | | Score | | Set 1 | Set 2 | Set 3 | Set 4 | Set 5 | Total | Report |
|---|---|---|---|---|---|---|---|---|---|---|---|
| 7 Apr | 18:00 | Imoco Volley Conegliano | 3–0 | Savino Del Bene Scandicci | 25–23 | 25–16 | 25–14 | | | 75–53 | Report |
| 10 Apr | 18:00 | Savino Del Bene Scandicci | 0–3 | Imoco Volley Conegliano | 23–25 | 19–25 | 15–25 | | | 57–75 | Report |

Imoco Volley Conegliano wins series, 2–0.

==== (2) Igor Gorgonzola Novara vs. (3) Saugella Monza ====
| Date | Time | | Score | | Set 1 | Set 2 | Set 3 | Set 4 | Set 5 | Total | Report |
|---|---|---|---|---|---|---|---|---|---|---|---|
| 7 Apr | 20:30 | Igor Gorgonzola Novara | 3–2 | Saugella Monza | 25–21 | 23–25 | 25–17 | 23–25 | 15–10 | 111–98 | Report |
| 10 Apr | 20:30 | Saugella Monza | 1–3 | Igor Gorgonzola Novara | 25–21 | 21–25 | 19–25 | 23–25 | | 88–96 | Report |

Igor Gorgonzola Novara wins series, 2–0.

=== Finals ===
==== (1) Imoco Volley Conegliano vs. (2) Igor Gorgonzola Novara ====
| Date | Time | | Score | | Set 1 | Set 2 | Set 3 | Set 4 | Set 5 | Total | Report |
|---|---|---|---|---|---|---|---|---|---|---|---|
| 17 Apr | 20:30 | Imoco Volley Conegliano | 3–0 | Igor Gorgonzola Novara | 23–25 | 40–38 | 26–24 | 23–25 | 15–9 | 127–121 | Report |
| 20 Apr | 20:30 | Igor Gorgonzola Novara | 0–3 | Imoco Volley Conegliano | 29–31 | 26–24 | 18–25 | 22–25 | | 95–105 | Report |

Imoco Volley Conegliano wins series, 2–0.

== Final standings ==
| 1st place, gold medalist(s) | Imoco Volley Conegliano |
| 2nd place, silver medalist(s) | Igor Gorgonzola Novara |
| | Saugella Monza |
| | Unet E-Work Busto Arsizio |
| | Savino Del Bene Scandicci |

Qualified for 2021–22 CEV Champions League
Qualified for 2021–22 CEV Cup
Qualified for 2021–22 CEV Challenge Cup

2021 Italian champions
Imoco Volley Conegliano
4th title

Lara Caravello, Lucille Gicquel, Božana Butigan, Robin de Kruijf, Raphaela Folie, Loveth Omoruyi, Monica De Gennaro, McKenzie Adams, Giulia Gennari, Joanna Wołosz (C), Kimberly Hill, Miriam Sylla, Paola Egonu, Sarah Fahr
Head coach
Daniele Santarelli
