= Cuneo Granda Volley =

- Full name: Cuneo Granda Volley
- Founded: 2003
- Ground: PalaCastagnaretta; Cuneo, Italy (Capacity: 4,700)
- Chairman: Patrizio Bianco
- Head coach: Fabio Tisci
- League: FIPAV Women's Serie A1
- Website: Club home page

Uniforms
Home	Away

Cuneo Granda Volley is an Italian professional women's volleyball club based in Cuneo. The team currently plays in the Serie A1, Italy's highest professional league.

== Previous names ==
Due to sponsorship, the club has competed under the following names:

- Granda Volley Cuneo Armando BreBanca (2003–2005)
- Armando BreBanca Cuneo (2005–2009)
- Armando Edilscavi Cuneo (2009–2012)
- Cuneo Granda Volley (2012–2014)
- BreBanca S.Bernardo Cuneo (2014–2017)
- UBI Banca S.Bernardo Cuneo (2017–2018)
- Bosca S.Bernardo Cuneo (2018–2022)
- Cuneo Granda S.Bernardo (2022–2023)
- Honda Olivero S.Bernardo Cuneo (2023–2024)
- Honda Olivero Cuneo (2024–2025)
- Honda Cuneo Granda Volley (2025–present)

== History ==
Cuneo Granda Volley was founded in 2003 and started playing in Serie C of the Italian league. In 2005 the club was promoted to Serie B2 where it played until 2009. Then a few seasons in the lower division Serie C followed before Cuneo Granda Volley was promoted to Serie B2 again in 2014. In the following season Cuneo Granda Volley finished in second place in the regular season in pool A of Serie B2. While the club was eliminated in the promotion playoffs it was still promoted to Serie B1 due to repechage.

In its first season (2015–2016) of Serie B1 Cuneo Granda Volley finished the regular season in third place in pool A, but failed to reach the promotion spot in the playoffs. The following season (2016–2017) Cuneo Granda Volley again finished the regular season in third place and this time the club won the playoffs and was promoted to Serie A2.

In its debut season (2017–2018) in Serie A2 the club finished in second place in the regular season, but in the promotion playoffs it was eliminated in the semifinals by Chieri '76. However, by acquiring the rights to play in Serie A1 from River Volley the club was still able to advance to the top league the following season. In the 2023–2024 season of Serie A1, Cuneo Granda Volley finished the regular season as the 13th ranked team and was relegated. Determined to stay in the top league, the club chose to acquire the rights to play in Serie A1 from Volleyball Casalmaggiore.

As of 2026, Cuneo Granda Volley's best result in Serie A1 is a seventh place in the regular season (2020–2021 and 2021–2022) and the quarterfinals of the championship playoffs.

== Team ==
2026–2027 Team
Number	Player	Position	Height (m)	Birth date
1	(Czech Republic) Ela Koulisiani	Middle Blocker	1.88	1 October 2002 (age 23)
2	(Italy) Carola Bonafede	Libero	1.75	16 January 2007 (age 19)
3	(Italy) Ludovica Guidi	Middle Blocker	1.86	17 December 1992 (age 33)
4	(Russia) Anna Tikhomirova	Outside Hitter	1.87	17 May 2004 (age 22)
7	(Italy) Sofia Ferrarini	Middle Blocker	1.86	2 June 2001 (age 25)
8	(Italy) Linda Magnani	Libero	1.57	20 November 2007 (age 18)
9	(Italy) Laura Pasquino	Setter	1.81	9 January 2002 (age 24)
11	(Greece) Élena Báka	Outside Hitter	1.87	15 October 2001 (age 24)
12	(Slovenia) Maša Pucelj	Outside Hitter	1.88	24 January 2006 (age 20)
13	(Italy) Noemi Signorile (c)	Setter	1.83	15 February 1990 (age 36)
17	(Romania) Bianca Cucu	Outside Hitter	1.87	4 December 2010 (age 15)
18	(Cuba) Lisania Grafort	Opposite	1.87	30 November 2004 (age 21)
21	(United States) Francesca McBride	Opposite	1.91	6 March 2002 (age 24)

2025–2026 Team
Number	Player	Position	Height (m)	Birth date
1	(Czech Republic) Ela Koulisiani	Middle Blocker	1.88	1 October 2002 (age 23)
2	(United States) Jaelyn Keene	Middle Blocker	1.88	17 August 1995 (age 30)
3	(Italy) Princess Atamah	Middle Blocker	1.86	1 March 2005 (age 21)
4	(Spain) Jessica Rivero	Outside Hitter	1.81	15 March 1995 (age 31)
5	(Colombia) Margarita Martínez	Outside Hitter	1.80	19 May 1995 (age 31)
6	(Netherlands) Nova Marring	Outside Hitter	1.86	6 September 2001 (age 24)
7	(United States) Erika Pritchard	Opposite	1.92	19 October 1999 (age 26)
8	(Italy) Linda Magnani	Libero	1.57	20 November 2007 (age 18)
9	(Italy) Safa Allaoui	Setter	1.85	1 February 2006 (age 20)
10	(Italy) Anna Bardaro	Libero	1.77	29 April 2005 (age 21)
11	(Italy) Agnese Cecconello	Middle Blocker	1.90	6 November 1999 (age 26)
12	(Slovenia) Maša Pucelj	Outside Hitter	1.88	24 January 2006 (age 20)
13	(Italy) Noemi Signorile (c)	Setter	1.83	15 February 1990 (age 36)
18	(Italy) Bintu Diop	Opposite	1.94	2 March 2002 (age 24)

2024–2025 Team
Number	Player	Position	Height (m)	Birth date
~~1~~	(Italy) ~~Alessia Bisegna~~ (Note: Alessia Bisegna left the team on 20 December 2024.)	~~Middle Blocker~~	~~1.83~~	~~9 April 2003 (age 23)~~
2	(Italy) Alice Turco	Setter	1.78	4 February 2000 (age 26)
3	(Italy) Valentina Colombo	Middle Blocker	1.85	12 December 2003 (age 22)
4	(Colombia) Margarita Martínez	Outside Hitter	1.80	19 May 1995 (age 31)
5	(Netherlands) Tessa Polder	Middle Blocker	1.89	10 October 1997 (age 28)
6	(Italy) Agnese Cecconello	Middle Blocker	1.90	6 November 1999 (age 26)
7	(Italy) Sara Panetoni	Libero	1.74	6 May 2000 (age 26)
8	(United States) Anna Dodson (Note: Anna Dodson joined the team on 18 December 2024.)	Middle Blocker	1.96	7 May 2001 (age 25)
9	(Italy) Rebecca Scialanca	Libero	1.65	29 May 2005 (age 21)
10	(Serbia) Ana Bjelica	Opposite	1.91	3 April 1992 (age 34)
~~11~~	(Sweden) ~~Alexandra Lazić~~ (Note: Alexandra Lazić left the team on 15 January 2025.)	~~Outside Hitter~~	~~1.88~~	~~24 September 1994 (age 31)~~
12	(Greece) Efrosyni Bakodímou	Outside Hitter	1.81	25 January 2000 (age 26)
13	(Italy) Noemi Signorile (c)	Setter	1.83	15 February 1990 (age 36)
14	(Germany) Margareta Kozuch (Note: Margareta Kozuch joined the team on 31 January 2025.)	Opposite	1.86	30 October 1986 (age 39)
15	(Brazil) Mariana Brambilla (Note: Mariana Brambilla joined the team on 15 January 2025.)	Outside Hitter	1.81	19 March 2000 (age 26)
~~18~~	(Italy) ~~Letizia Camera~~ (Note: Letizia Camera left the team on 3 March 2025.)	~~Setter~~	~~1.75~~	~~1 October 1992 (age 33)~~
24	(Russia) Anastasiia Kapralova	Outside Hitter	1.84	24 April 2004 (age 22)
94	(Cuba) Dayami Sánchez	Opposite	1.90	14 March 1994 (age 32)

2023–2024 Team
Number	Player	Position	Height (m)	Birth date
2	(Italy) Francesca Scola	Setter	1.83	15 September 2001 (age 24)
4	(Italy) Saly Thior	Middle Blocker	1.79	29 December 2004 (age 21)
5	(Italy) Alice Tanase	Outside Hitter	1.83	25 May 2000 (age 26)
6	(Italy) Federica Ferrario	Libero	1.62	31 May 2001 (age 25)
7	(France) Amandha Sylves	Middle Blocker	1.96	29 December 2000 (age 25)
8	(Germany) Lena Stigrot	Outside Hitter	1.82	20 December 1994 (age 31)
9	(Italy) Anna Adelusi	Opposite	1.86	10 June 2003 (age 23)
10	(United States) Madison Kubik	Outside Hitter	1.91	8 January 2001 (age 25)
11	(Netherlands) Anneclaire Ter Brugge (Note: Anneclaire Ter Brugge joined the team on 1 March 2024.)	Opposite	1.86	20 February 2002 (age 24)
12	(Italy) Terry Enweonwu	Opposite	1.85	12 May 2000 (age 26)
13	(Italy) Noemi Signorile (c)	Setter	1.83	15 February 1990 (age 36)
14	(United States) Anna Hall	Middle Blocker	1.85	8 July 1999 (age 27)
15	(Italy) Serena Scognamillo	Libero	1.70	24 February 2001 (age 25)
17	(Sweden) Anna Haak	Outside Hitter	1.79	19 September 1996 (age 29)
21	(Italy) Beatrice Molinaro	Middle Blocker	1.90	15 June 1995 (age 31)

2022–2023 Team
Number	Player	Position	Height (m)	Birth date
1	(Russia) Sofya Kuznetsova	Outside Hitter	1.82	31 October 1999 (age 26)
3	(United States) Danielle Drews	Outside Hitter	1.83	2 February 1999 (age 27)
4	(Netherlands) Kim Klein Lankhorst	Setter	1.76	5 July 2002 (age 24)
6	(Italy) Agnese Cecconello	Middle Blocker	1.90	6 November 1999 (age 26)
7	(Italy) Lara Caravello	Libero	1.76	4 May 1994 (age 32)
8	(Italy) Camilla Basso	Middle Blocker	1.81	25 March 2006 (age 20)
9	(Italy) Beatrice Agrifoglio	Setter	1.78	1 January 1994 (age 32)
10	(Hungary) Gréta Szakmáry	Outside Hitter	1.86	31 December 1991 (age 34)
11	(France) Lucille Gicquel	Opposite	1.89	13 November 1997 (age 28)
12	(Italy) Francesca Magazza	Outside Hitter	1.75	12 March 2002 (age 24)
13	(Italy) Noemi Signorile (c)	Setter	1.83	15 February 1990 (age 36)
14	(United States) Anna Hall	Middle Blocker	1.85	8 July 1999 (age 27)
16	(Italy) Sara Caruso	Middle Blocker	1.93	5 February 2001 (age 25)
18	(Italy) Binto Diop	Opposite	1.94	2 March 2002 (age 24)
20	(Italy) Alice Gay	Libero	1.65	24 January 2002 (age 24)

2021–2022 Team
Number	Player	Position	Height (m)	Birth date
1	(Russia) Sofya Kuznetsova	Outside Hitter	1.82	31 October 1999 (age 26)
2	(Italy) Alice Degradi	Outside Hitter	1.81	10 April 1996 (age 30)
3	(Italy) Beatrice Battistino	Outside Hitter	1.80	23 August 2004 (age 21)
4	(Italy) Federica Squarcini	Middle Blocker	1.83	24 September 2000 (age 25)
5	(Italy) Ilaria Spirito	Libero	1.75	20 February 1994 (age 32)
6	(Italy) Gaia Giovannini	Outside Hitter	1.82	17 December 2001 (age 24)
7	(Italy) Elisa Zanette	Opposite	1.93	17 February 1996 (age 30)
9	(Italy) Beatrice Agrifoglio	Setter	1.78	1 January 1994 (age 32)
11	(France) Lucille Gicquel	Opposite	1.89	13 November 1997 (age 28)
13	(Italy) Noemi Signorile (c)	Setter	1.83	15 February 1990 (age 36)
16	(Italy) Sara Caruso	Middle Blocker	1.93	5 February 2001 (age 25)
18	(Netherlands) Marrit Jasper	Outside Hitter	1.80	28 February 1996 (age 30)
20	(Italy) Alice Gay	Libero	1.65	24 January 2002 (age 24)
22	(Italy) Federica Stufi	Middle Blocker	1.85	22 March 1988 (age 38)

2020–2021 Team
Number	Player	Position	Height (m)	Birth date
1	(Albania) Erblira Bici	Opposite	1.85	27 June 1995 (age 31)
2	(Italy) Alice Degradi	Outside Hitter	1.81	10 April 1996 (age 30)
3	(Dominican Republic) Massiel Matos (Note: Massiel Matos joined the team at the end of January 2021.)	Outside Hitter	1.84	16 April 1998 (age 28)
4	(Italy) Beatrice Battistino	Outside Hitter	1.80	23 August 2004 (age 21)
5	(Italy) Alice Turco	Setter	1.78	4 February 2000 (age 26)
6	(Italy) Gaia Giovannini	Outside Hitter	1.82	17 December 2001 (age 24)
8	(Italy) Sonia Candi	Middle Blocker	1.87	8 November 1993 (age 32)
~~9~~	(Greece) ~~Olga Strantzali~~ (Note: Olga Strantzali left the team on 7 January 2021.)	~~Outside Hitter~~	~~1.85~~	~~12 January 1996 (age 30)~~
12	(Italy) Francesca Fava	Middle Blocker	1.82	20 April 1998 (age 28)
13	(Italy) Noemi Signorile (c)	Setter	1.83	15 February 1990 (age 36)
14	(Serbia) Milka Stijepić	Opposite	1.82	30 August 1997 (age 28)
15	(Italy) Giorgia Zannoni	Libero	1.71	11 February 1998 (age 28)
16	(Cyprus) Katerina Zakchaiou	Middle Blocker	1.92	26 July 1998 (age 27)
19	(Romania) Adelina Budăi-Ungureanu	Outside Hitter	1.87	29 July 2000 (age 25)
20	(Italy) Alice Gay	Libero	1.65	24 January 2002 (age 24)

2019–2020 Team
Number	Player	Position	Height (m)	Birth date
1	(Italy) Carlotta Cambi	Setter	1.76	28 May 1996 (age 30)
3	(Argentina) Yamila Nizetich (c)	Outside Hitter	1.83	27 January 1989 (age 37)
3	(Italy) Alice Gay	Libero	1.65	24 January 2002 (age 24)
6	(Austria) Srna Marković	Outside Hitter	1.84	6 June 1996 (age 30)
7	(Italy) Laura Frigo	Middle Blocker	1.85	26 October 1990 (age 35)
8	(Italy) Sonia Candi	Middle Blocker	1.87	8 November 1993 (age 32)
9	(Italy) Beatrice Agrifoglio	Setter	1.78	1 January 1994 (age 32)
10	(Belgium) Lise Van Hecke	Opposite	1.92	1 July 1992 (age 34)
11	(Italy) Gloria Baldi	Opposite	1.85	31 May 1993 (age 33)
14	(United States) Madison Rigdon	Outside Hitter	1.85	3 December 1995 (age 30)
15	(Italy) Giorgia Zannoni	Libero	1.71	11 February 1998 (age 28)
18	(Italy) Marina Zambelli	Middle Blocker	1.87	1 January 1990 (age 36)
19	(Romania) Adelina Budăi-Ungureanu	Outside Hitter	1.87	29 July 2000 (age 25)

2018–2019 Team
Number	Player	Position	Height (m)	Birth date
1	(Italy) Alessandra Baiocco	Libero	1.80	24 January 1996 (age 30)
2	(Cuba) Wilma Salas	Outside Hitter	1.88	9 March 1991 (age 35)
6	(Austria) Srna Marković	Outside Hitter	1.84	6 June 1996 (age 30)
8	(Italy) Áurea Cruz (c)	Outside Hitter	1.83	10 January 1982 (age 44)
9	(Poland) Anna Kaczmar	Setter	1.80	26 September 1985 (age 40)
10	(Belgium) Lise Van Hecke	Opposite	1.92	1 July 1992 (age 34)
11	(Italy) Sara Menghi	Middle Blocker	1.83	18 May 1983 (age 43)
12	(Italy) Francesca Bosio	Setter	1.80	7 August 1997 (age 28)
15	(Portugal) Júlia Kavalenka	Opposite	1.91	2 March 1999 (age 27)
16	(Italy) Jole Ruzzini	Libero	1.62	25 February 1984 (age 42)
18	(Italy) Marina Zambelli	Middle Blocker	1.87	1 January 1990 (age 36)
19	(Italy) Floriana Bertone	Middle Blocker	2.02	19 November 1992 (age 33)
23	(Italy) Giulia Mancini	Middle Blocker	1.83	23 May 1998 (age 28)

== Head coaches ==
Period	Head coach
2015–2017	(Italy) Andrea Ebana
2017–2017	(Italy) Maurizio Conti
2017–2018	(Italy) François Salvagni
2018–2022	(Italy) Andrea Pistola
2022–2022	(Italy) Luciano Pedullà
2022–2023	(Italy) Emanuele Zanini
2023–2024	(Italy) Massimo Bellano
2024–2024	(Italy) Stefano Micoli
2024–2025	(Italy) Lorenzo Pintus
2025–2026	(Italy) François Salvagni
2026–	(Italy) Fabio Tisci
