= Miroslava Kijaková =

Slovak volleyball player

Personal information
- Nationality: Slovak
- Born: 5 May 1988 (age 38); Bardejov, Czechoslovakia
- Height: 1.80 m (5 ft 11 in)
- Weight: 69 kg (152 lb)
- Spike: 305 cm (120 in)
- Block: 295 cm (116 in)

Volleyball information
- Position: Outside-spiker
- Current club: (Israel) Hapoel Kfar Saba

Career
Years	Teams
2019–current	Hapoel Kfar Saba

National team
2014–present	Slovakia

Miroslava Kijaková (born 5 May 1988) is a Slovak female volleyball player. She is part of the Slovakia women's national volleyball team. She competed at the 2019 Women's European Volleyball Championship.

== Clubs ==
- (Slovakia) VK Vranov nad Topľou (2003–2006)
- (Slovakia) TU Košice (2006–2008)
- (Slovakia) VK Spišská Nová Ves (2008–2010)
- (Poland) Ostrowiec Świętokrzyski (2010–2011)
- (Poland) Radom, Politechnika (2011–2012)
- (Poland) AGH Galeco Wisła Kraków (2012–2013)
- (Romania) CSM Volei Alba Blaj (2013–2014)
- (Switzerland) VC Kanti Schaffhausen (2014–2015)
- (Greece) AO Thiras (2015–2016)
- (Italy) Trentino Rosa (2016–2017)
- (Italy) Due Principati Baronissi (2017–2018)
- (Spain) CV Haris (2018–2018)
- (Cyprus) Anorthosis Famagusta (2018–2019)
- (Israel) Hapoel Kfar Saba (2019–2020)
- (Taiwan) CMFC, Chinese (2020–2021)
