= Trentino Rosa =

Italian women's volleyball club (2008-2022)

Delta Despar Trentino
- Full name: Trentino Rosa Volley
- Founded: 2008
- Dissolved: 2022
- Ground: PalaSanbapolis; Trento, Italy (Capacity: 500)

Uniforms
Home	Away

Trentino Rosa was an Italian women's volleyball club based in Pergine Valsugana. The club's activities ceased in 2022 when it sold its rights to play in Serie A2 to Trentino Volley.

== Previous names ==
Due to sponsorship, the club has competed under the following names:

- La Trentina Diatec Trentino (2010–2011)
- Delta Informatica Trentino (2014–2020)
- Delta Despar Trentino (2020–2022)

== History ==
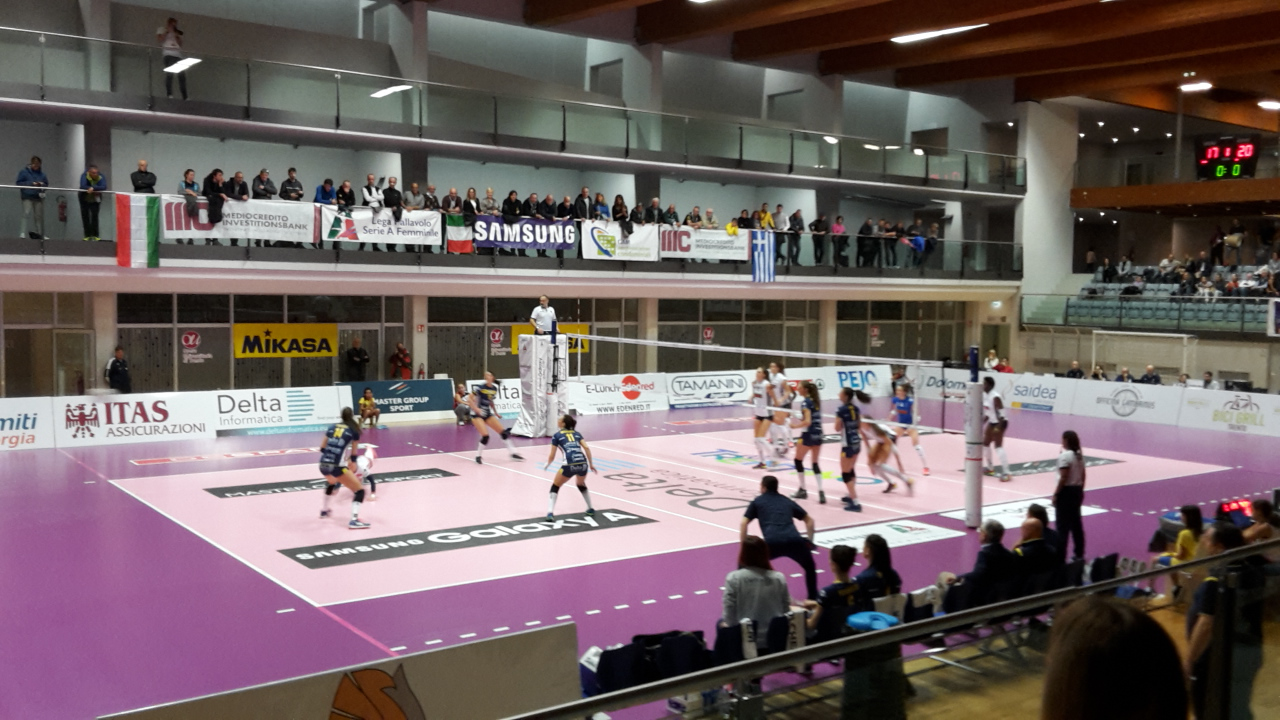
Trentino Rosa in the season 2017-2018

The club was established in 2008, when its founder Roberto Postal decided to take the first team of Mattarello's club Polisportiva Torrefranca to a more focused path and bring together the best players in the region. After received the first team rights, Roberto Postal created Trentino Rosa which was based in Mattarello.

The club started in the Serie B1 (third division) and in 2009 it started a collaboration with Trentino Volley which enhanced the team culminating with a promotion to Serie A2 at the end of the 2010–11 season. Due to financial problems the club was forced to renounce the promotion and its rights to play the Serie A2. The club relocates from Mattarello to Pergine Valsugana and restarted in the 2012–13 from Serie B1 with the sponsorship of Delta Informatica reaching promotion to Serie A2 in the following season. In 2015–16 the club lost the promotion playoff final to Saugella Team Monza, missing a promotion to Serie A1.

In the 2019–20 season, the team won the Coppa Italia Serie A2 and also led the regular Serie A2 when the season was canceled due to COVID-19. The club applied for repechage to Serie A1 which was approved by the Lega Volley Femminile on 30 July 2020. In its first season in Serie A1, 2020–21, Trentino Rosa finished 8th in the regular season and advanced to the playoffs where it lost to Il Bisonte Firenze. In the 2021–22 season the team finished 14th and last in the regular season and was relegated back to Serie A2. In June 2022 Trentino Volley acquired the rights to play in Serie A2 from Trentino Rosa and the club was dissolved.

== Team ==
2021–2022 Team
Number	Player	Position	Height (m)	Birth date
1	(Italy) Vittoria Piani	Opposite	1.87	12 February 1998 (age 28)
2	(United States) August Raskie	Setter	1.83	13 December 1996 (age 29)
3	(Argentina) Yamila Nizetich	Outside Hitter	1.83	27 January 1989 (age 37)
4	(Spain) Jessica Rivero	Outside Hitter	1.81	15 March 1995 (age 31)
5	(Italy) Ilenia Moro	Libero	1.78	5 February 1999 (age 27)
6	(Italy) Chiara Mason	Outside Hitter	1.83	11 July 2000 (age 25)
7	(Italy) Geraldina Quiligotti	Libero	1.67	16 October 1994 (age 31)
8	(Italy) Michela Rucli	Middle blocker	1.85	1 May 1996 (age 30)
10	(Italy) Martina Stocco	Setter	1.90	27 January 2000 (age 26)
12	(Italy) Eleonora Furlan	Middle blocker	1.88	10 March 1995 (age 31)
14	(Italy) Irene Botarelli	Opposite	1.88	18 June 1996 (age 29)
15	(Italy) Beatrice Berti	Middle blocker	1.93	12 January 1996 (age 30)

2020–2021 Team
Number	Player	Position	Height (m)	Birth date
1	(Italy) Vittoria Piani	Opposite	1.87	12 February 1998 (age 28)
2	(Italy) Benedetta Marcone	Outside Hitter	1.80	17 May 1993 (age 32)
4	(Italy) Francesca Trevisan	Outside Hitter	1.80	22 September 1995 (age 30)
5	(Italy) Ilenia Moro	Libero	1.78	5 February 1999 (age 27)
6	(Italy) Silvia Fondriest	Middle blocker	1.88	29 December 1988 (age 37)
7	(Italy) Maria Luisa Cumino	Setter	1.77	22 April 1992 (age 34)
8	(Italy) Maria Irene Ricci	Setter	1.81	17 February 1996 (age 30)
9	(Italy) Sofia D'Odorico	Outside Hitter	1.86	6 January 1997 (age 29)
11	(Italy) Valeria Pizzolato	Middle blocker	1.82	20 May 1999 (age 26)
12	(Italy) Eleonora Furlan	Middle blocker	1.88	10 March 1995 (age 31)
13	(Italy) Giulia Melli	Outside hitter	1.85	8 January 1998 (age 28)
17	(Italy) Elena Bisio	Opposite	1.83	4 June 2000 (age 25)

2019–2020 Team
Number	Player	Position	Height (m)	Birth date
1	(Italy) Vittoria Piani	Opposite	1.87	12 February 1998 (age 28)
2	(Italy) Francesca Cosi	Middle blocker	1.89	27 March 2000 (age 26)
4	(Italy) Barbora Kosekova	Setter	1.79	22 November 1994 (age 31)
5	(Italy) Ilenia Moro	Libero	1.78	5 February 1999 (age 27)
6	(Italy) Silvia Fondriest	Middle blocker	1.88	29 December 1988 (age 37)
7	(Italy) Sofia D'Odorico	Outside Hitter	1.86	6 January 1997 (age 29)
9	(Italy) Valentina Barbolini	Outside Hitter	1.86	17 May 1993 (age 32)
10	(Italy) Elisa Moncada	Setter	1.75	14 November 1987 (age 38)
12	(Italy) Eleonora Furlan	Middle blocker	1.88	10 March 1995 (age 31)
13	(Italy) Giulia Melli	Outside hitter	1.85	8 January 1998 (age 28)
15	(Italy) Vittoria Vianello	Libero	1.70	22 December 2000 (age 25)
16	(Italy) Diana Giometti	Outside hitter	1.80	15 August 1996 (age 29)
17	(Italy) Virginia Berasi	Setter	1.70	17 February 1994 (age 32)

2018–2019 Team
Number	Player	Position	Height (m)	Birth date
1	(Italy) Roberta Carraro	Setter	1.81	17 November 1998 (age 27)
2	(Italy) Gloria Baldi	Opposite	1.85	31 May 1993 (age 32)
3	(Italy) Chiara Mason	Outside Hitter	1.83	11 July 2000 (age 25)
5	(Italy) Ilenia Moro	Libero	1.78	5 February 1999 (age 27)
6	(Italy) Silvia Fondriest	Middle blocker	1.88	29 December 1988 (age 37)
8	(Italy) Alessia Mazzon	Middle blocker	1.84	17 August 1998 (age 27)
9	(Italy) Giorgia Mazzon	Opposite	1.85	17 August 1998 (age 27)
10	(Italy) Elisa Moncada	Setter	1.75	14 November 1987 (age 38)
11	(Italy) Sofia Tosi	Opposite	1.84	22 April 1997 (age 29)
12	(Italy) Eleonora Furlan	Middle blocker	1.88	10 March 1995 (age 31)
14	(Italy) Alessia Fiesoli	Outside hitter	1.85	25 May 1994 (age 31)
15	(Italy) Vittoria Vianello	Libero	1.70	22 December 2000 (age 25)
18	(United States) Deja McClendon	Outside hitter	1.85	27 June 1992 (age 33)

2017–2018 Team
Number	Player	Position	Height (m)	Birth date
1	(Italy) Roberta Carraro	Setter	1.81	17 November 1998 (age 27)
5	(Italy) Francesca Michieletto	Outside hitter	1.82	10 September 1997 (age 28)
6	(Italy) Silvia Fondriest	Middle blocker	1.88	29 December 1988 (age 37)
7	(Italy) Ilenia Moro	Outside hitter	1.78	5 February 1999 (age 27)
8	(Italy) Rebeka Fucka	Middle blocker	1.87	18 May 1999 (age 26)
9	(Greece) Eleni Kiosi	Opposite	1.85	27 February 1985 (age 41)
10	(Italy) Carolina Zardo	Libero	1.68	16 November 1992 (age 33)
11	(Italy) Elisa Moncada	Setter	1.75	14 November 1987 (age 38)
12	(Hungary) Bernadett Dékány	Outside hitter	1.86	30 June 1992 (age 33)
13	(Italy) Ilaria Antonucci	Opposite	1.83	26 June 1987 (age 38)
14	(Italy) Alessia Fiesoli	Outside hitter	1.85	25 May 1994 (age 31)
18	(Italy) Gaia Moretto	Middle blocker	1.92	18 September 1994 (age 31)

2016–2017 Team
Number	Player	Position	Height (m)	Birth date
3	(Greece) Maria Nomikou	Outside hitter	1.90	30 March 1993 (age 33)
5	(Italy) Francesca Michieletto	Outside hitter	1.82	10 September 1997 (age 28)
6	(Italy) Silvia Fondriest	Middle blocker	1.88	29 December 1988 (age 37)
7	(Italy) Ramona Aricò	Opposite	1.87	30 October 1985 (age 40)
8	(Italy) Martina Bogatec	Middle blocker	1.85	8 November 1991 (age 34)
9	(Slovakia) Miroslava Kijaková	Outside hitter	1.80	5 May 1988 (age 37)
10	(Italy) Carolina Zardo	Libero	1.68	16 November 1992 (age 33)
11	(Italy) Elisa Moncada	Setter	1.75	14 November 1987 (age 38)
12	(Italy) Ludovica Montesi	Outside hitter	1.77	16 December 1997 (age 28)
13	(Italy) Ilaria Antonucci	Opposite	1.83	26 June 1987 (age 38)
14	(Italy) Laura Bortoli	Setter	1.80	9 January 1996 (age 30)
15	(Italy) Sofia Rebora	Middle blocker	1.80	23 February 1993 (age 33)
17	(Italy) Cristina Coppi	Outside hitter	1.82	13 September 1994 (age 31)
