= Noemi Signorile =

Italian volleyball player (born 1990)

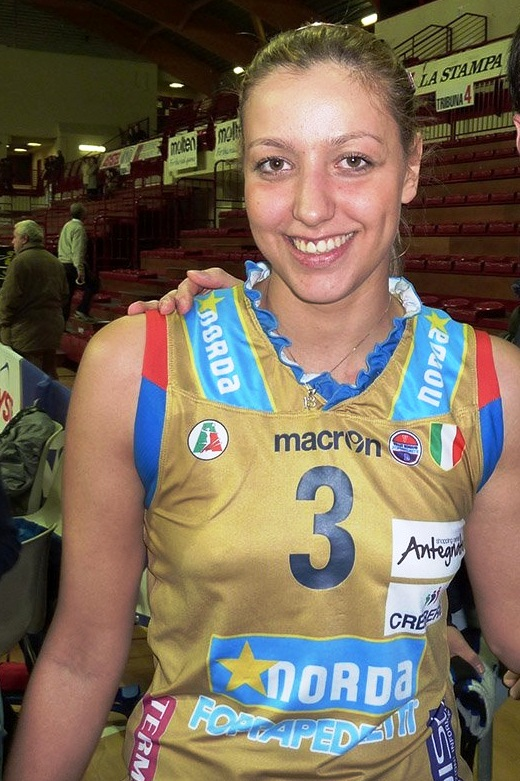

Personal information
- Full name: Noemi Signorile
- Nationality: Italian
- Born: February 15, 1990 (age 36); Turin, Italy
- Height: 1.82 m (5 ft 11 1/2 in)
- Weight: 74 kg (163 lb)
- Spike: 284 cm (112 in)
- Block: 265 cm (104 in)

Volleyball information
- Position: Setter
- Current club: (Italy) Cuneo Granda Volley
- Number: 13
Honours
Women's volleyball
Representing Italy
FIVB Volleyball Women's World Cup
Gold medal – first place	2011 Japan	Team

Noemi Signorile (born 15 February 1990) is an Italian professional volleyball player who played with her national team at the 2014 World Championship.

== Career ==
Signorile played with her national team at the 2014 World Championship. There her team ended up in fourth place after losing 2–3 to Brazil the bronze medal match.

== Clubs ==
- (Italy) Chieri Volley (2005–2006)
- (Italy) Club Italia (2006–2008)
- (Italy) Esperia Cremona (2008–2009)
- (Italy) Verona Volley (2009–2010)
- (Italy) Volley Bergamo (2010–2012)
- (Italy) Robursport Volley Pesaro (2012–2013)
- (Italy) Pallavolo Ornavasso (2013–2014)
- (Italy) AGIL Volley (2014–2016)
- (Italy) UYBA Volley Busto Arsizio (2016–2017)
- (Romania) CSM București (2017–2018)
- (France) RC Cannes (2018–2020)
- (Italy) Cuneo Granda Volley (2020–)

== Awards ==
=== Clubs ===
- 2010 FIVB Club World Championship – Bronze medal, with Volley Bergamo
- 2010–11 Italian Cup – Runner-Up, with Volley Bergamo
- 2010–11 Italian Championship – Champions, with Volley Bergamo
- 2011 Italian Super Cup – Champions, with Volley Bergamo
- 2014–15 Italian Cup – Champions, with AGIL Volley
- 2014–15 Italian Championship – Runner-Up, with AGIL Volley
- 2015 Italian Super Cup – Runner-Up, with AGIL Volley
- 2016–17 CEV Cup – Runner-Up, with Busto Arsizio
- 2017–18 Romanian Cup – Champions, with CSM București
- 2017–18 Romanian Championship – Champions, with CSM București
- 2018–19 French Championship – Champions, with RC Cannes
- 2019 French Super Cup – Champions, with RC Cannes

=== National team ===
==== Junior team ====
- 2007 U18 European Championships – Bronze Medal
- 2008 U20 European Championships – Gold Medal

==== Senior team ====
- 2011 FIVB World Cup – Gold Medal
