= Lise Van Hecke =

Belgian volleyball player

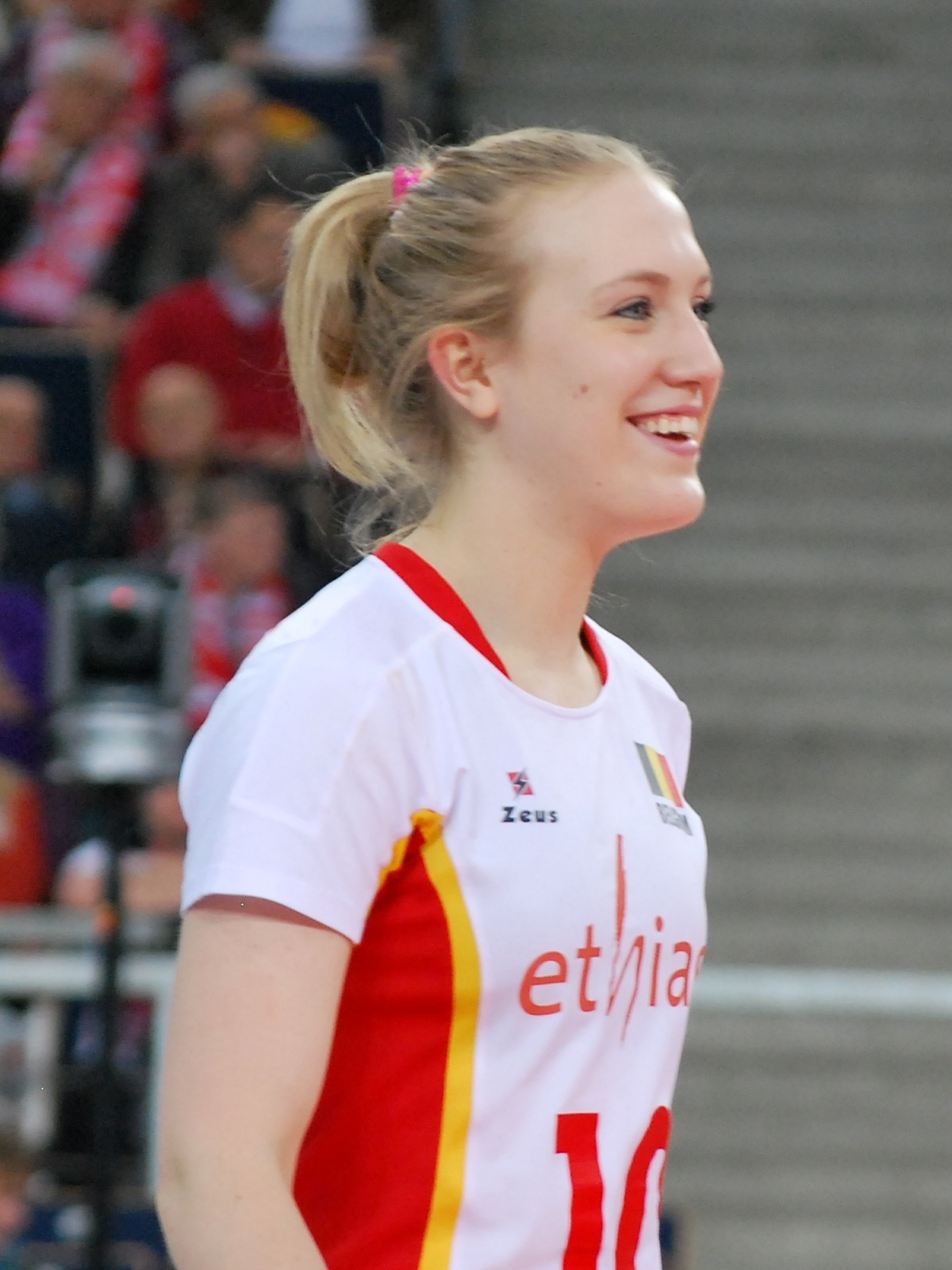

Personal information
- Nationality: Belgium
- Born: 1 July 1992 (age 34); Sint-Niklaas, Belgium
- Height: 1.92 m (6 ft 4 in)
- Weight: 70 kg (154 lb)
- Spike: 299 cm (118 in)
- Block: 281 cm (111 in)

Volleyball information
- Position: Opposite spiker
- Number: 10

Career
Years	Teams
2008–2011; 2011–2013; 2013–2015; 2015–2016; 2016-2017; 2017-2018; 2018-2019; 2020-2021; 2021-2022; 2022-2023; 2023-	(Belgium) Asterix Kieldrecht (Italy) Tiboni Urbino Volley (Italy) River Piacenza (Brazil) Vôlei Nestlé Osasco (Turkey) Beşiktaş (Italy) Volley Pesaro (Italy) Cuneo Granda Volley (Italy) Vero Volley Monza
Honours
Women's volleyball
Representing Belgium
European Championships
Bronze medal – third place	2013 Germany	Team

Lise Van Hecke (born 1 July 1992) is a Belgian female volleyball player. She was a member of the Belgium women's national volleyball team that won a historic bronze medal at the 2013 Women's European Volleyball Championship. She was part of the Belgian national team at the 2014 FIVB Volleyball Women's World Championship in Italy.

Although van Heck never officially announced her retirement from the Belgium women's national volleyball team, she was one of the many players that started turning down invitations for the team. The reason became clear in December 2021 when Belgian national TV broadcaster VRT Canvas aired a documentary "The Price of the Winner" with testimony of Van Hecke's former teammates Freya Aelbrecht, Valérie Courtois and Hélène Rousseaux decrying a toxic environment under headcoach Gert Vande Broek. After the program aired, Van Hecke, contacted by several newspapers, confirmed the stories of her former teammates.

== Clubs ==
- (Belgium) Asterix Kieldrecht (2008–2011)
- (Italy) Tiboni Urbino Volley (2011–2013)
- (Italy) River Piacenza (2013–2015)
- (Brazil) Vôlei Nestlé Osasco (2015–2016)
- (Turkey) Beşiktaş (2016–2017)
- (Italy) Volley Pesaro (2017–2018)
- (Italy) Cuneo Granda Volley (2018–2019)
- (Italy) Vero Volley Monza (2020–2021)
- (Japan) Hisamitsu Springs (2022–2023)
- (Japan) Toyota Auto Body Queenseis (2023-)
