= María Martínez (volleyball) =

Colombian volleyball player (born 1995)

María Margarita Martínez

Personal information
- Nationality: Colombian
- Born: 19 May 1995 (age 31)
- Height: 178 cm (5 ft 10 in)
- Weight: 74 kg (163 lb)
- Spike: 290 cm (114 in)
- Block: 285 cm (112 in)

Career
Years	Teams
2015	Liga Vallecaucana

National team
2015	Colombia
Honours
Women's volleyball
Representing Colombia
Pan American Games
Silver medal – second place	2019 Lima	Team
South American Championship
Silver medal – second place	2019 Cajamarca

María Margarita Martínez (born 19 May 1995) is a Colombian volleyball player. She is part of the Colombia women's national volleyball team. On club level she played for Liga Vallecaucana in 2015.
