= Volleyball Casalmaggiore =

Italian women's volleyball club

- Full name: VBC Cremonese
- Founded: 2008
- Ground: PalaRadi, Cremona, Italy (Capacity: 2,918)
- Chairman: Giovanni Ghini
- Head coach: Davide Baraldi
- League: FIPAV Women's Serie A2
- Website: Club home page

Uniforms
Home	Away

Volleyball Casalmaggiore, also known as VBC Cremonese, is an Italian women's volleyball club based in Casalmaggiore. The team currently plays in the Serie A2, Italy's second highest professional league.

== Previous names ==
Due to sponsorship, the club have competed under the following names:

- VBC Pallavolo Rosa (2008–2009)
- VBC Pomì (2009–2010)
- Pomì Casalmaggiore (2010–2019)
- VBC Èpiù Casalmaggiore (2020–2021)
- VBC Trasporti Pesanti Casalmaggiore (2022–2024)
- Volleyball Casalmaggiore (2024–2025)
- Èpiù Casalmaggiore (2025–2026)
- Caldaie Melgari VBC Cremonese (2026–)

== History ==
The club was founded in 2008 by the acquisition of a Serie B2 licence from Pallavolo Zevio. The club was named VBC Pallavolo Rosa, VBC is the acronym for Volley Ball Casalmaggiore. As the club progressed through the national leagues, the home venue was changed to comply with league regulations and accommodate a larger number of supporters. From the Palazzetto dello Sport Baslenga in Casalmaggiore, the club first moved to PalaFarina in Viadana and then to PalaRadi in Cremona. The first promotion happened in 2010 to Serie B1, one season later promotion to Serie A2 was achieved and in 2013 it reached the Serie A1.

Already in its second season playing in Serie A1 (2014–15), Volleyball Casalmaggiore won the league title by defeating AGIL Volley in the play-off finals. The success continued the following season when the club won both the 2015 Italian Super Cup and the 2015–16 CEV Champions League.

In 2024, Volleyball Casalmaggiore lost its main sponsor and for financial reasons the club decided to sell the rights to play in Serie A1 to Cuneo Granda Volley. For the 2024–25 season, Volleyball Casalmaggiore instead acquired the rights to play in Serie A2 from G.S. Fo.Co.L. Volley Legnano. In June 2026, the club changed its brand name to VBC Cremonese.

== Team ==
2026–2027 Team
Number	Player	Position	Height (m)	Birth date
~~1~~	(Italy) ~~Ludovica Franzoso~~ (Note: Ludovica Franzoso left the team on 13 October 2026.)	~~Libero~~	~~1.70~~	~~14 January 2003 (age 23)~~
3	(Italy) Alessia Populini	Outside Hitter	1.81	10 September 2000 (age 26)
4	(Canada) Natasha Calkins	Opposite	1.86	15 July 1996 (age 30)
5	(Italy) Layla Viti	Outside Hitter	1.86	27 May 2008 (age 18)
6	(Italy) Irene Mescoli	Outside Hitter	1.85	10 July 2006 (age 20)
7	(Italy) Ilaria Menon	Middle Blocker	1.85	15 October 2005 (age 20)
8	(Italy) Alice Bernardeschi	Setter	1.83	28 April 2004 (age 22)
9	(Italy) Arianna Gambini	Libero	1.76	14 April 2005 (age 21)
10	(Italy) Chiara Muzi	Opposite	1.85	23 October 1998 (age 27)
11	(Italy) Vittoria Prandi	Setter	1.80	4 November 1994 (age 31)
13	(Italy) Sara Tajè	Middle Blocker	1.87	3 December 1998 (age 27)
17	(Italy) Sara Loda	Outside Hitter	1.78	22 August 1990 (age 36)
18	(Italy) Betsy Nwokoye	Middle Blocker	2.02	18 July 2005 (age 21)
19	(Italy) Miranda Zanella	Middle Blocker	1.88	19 March 2008 (age 18)

== Honours ==
=== National competitions ===
- National League: 1

2014–15

- Italian Super Cup: 1

2015

=== International competitions ===
- CEV Champions League: 1

2015–16
