= 2025 FIVB Women's Volleyball Nations League squads =

This article shows the roster of all the participating teams at the 2025 FIVB Women's Volleyball Nations League. Each team names a full list of up to 30 players, but only 12 to 14 players can be used in a week, chosen from the full list.

== Belgium ==
The following was Belgium's roster at the 2025 Women's Volleyball Nations League.

Head coach: (Belgium) Kris Vansnick

- 1 Saar Bertels OH
- 2 Elise Van Sas S
- 3 Britt Herbots OH
- 4 Nathalie Lemmens MB
- 5 Tea Radovic OH
- 6 Helena Gilson OH
- 7 Anna Koulberg MB
- 8 Lara Nagels S
- 9 Nel Demeyer OH
- 10 Pauline Martin O
- 11 Anke Waelkens MB
- 12 Charlotte Krenicky S
- 13 Marlies Janssens MB
- 15 Charline Humblet MB
- 16 Noor Debouck L
- 17 Kaat Cos OH
- 18 Britt Rampelberg L
- 19 Silke Van Avermaet MB
- 20 Britt Fransen MB
- 21 Manon Stragier OH
- 22 Liese Verhelst O
- 23 Yana Wouters MB
- 24 Dominika Strumilo OH
- 25 Eline Van Elsen OH
- 27 Annelore Engels S
- 28 Mila Vlahovic O
- 29 Pauline Luyten OH
- 30 Jasmine Debout L
- 31 Sarah Hauben MB
- 32 Flore Maes MB

== Brazil ==
The following was Brazil's roster at the 2025 Women's Volleyball Nations League.

Head coach: (Brazil) José Roberto Guimarães

- 1 Lanna Machado MB
- 2 Diana Duarte MB
- 3 Macris Carneiro S
- 4 Lorena Viezel MB
- 5 Aline Segato Maestri OH
- 6 Karoline Tormena OH
- 7 Rosamaria Montibeller O
- 8 Júlia Kudiess MB
- 9 Roberta Ratzke S
- 10 Gabriela Guimarães OH
- 11 Luzia Nezzo MB
- 12 Ana Cristina de Souza OH
- 13 Paulina de Souza L
- 14 Érica Motta Lima L
- 15 Helena Wenk Hoengen OH
- 16 Kisy Nascimento O
- 17 Júlia Bergmann OH
- 18 Jheovana Sebastião O
- 19 Tainara Santos O
- 20 Giovana Gasparini S
- 21 Ariane Teixeira O
- 22 Laís Vasques L
- 23 Sabrina Machado O
- 24 Kenya Malachias S
- 25 Marina Sioto S
- 26 Vivian Lima Jorge S
- 27 Valquíria Dullius MB
- 28 Mayhara da Silva MB
- 29 Lyara Medeiros S
- 30 Marcelle Mattos da Silva L

== Bulgaria ==
The following was Bulgaria's roster at the 2025 Women's Volleyball Nations League.

Head coach: (Bulgaria) Antonina Zetova

- 1 Iveta Stanchulova OH
- 2 Nasya Dimitrova MB
- 3 Lora Slavcheva S
- 4 Mariya Krivoshiyska MB
- 5 Maria Yordanova OH
- 6 Margarita Guncheva S
- 7 Lora Kitipova S
- 8 Aleksandra Georgieva OH
- 10 Miroslava Paskova OH
- 11 Hristina Hristova Vuchkova MB
- 13 Mila Pashkuleva L
- 14 Borislava Saykova MB
- 15 Zhana Todorova L
- 16 Elitsa Vasileva Atanasijević OH
- 17 Radostina Marinova O
- 18 Darina Naneva MB
- 19 Aleksandra Milanova OH
- 20 Iva Dudova O
- 21 Galina Karabasheva L
- 23 Mikaela Stoyanova O
- 25 Dariya Ivanova OH
- 27 Aleksandra Saykova MB
- 28 Merelin Nikolova O
- 29 Kristina Guncheva S
- 30 Mira Todorova MB
- 31 Emileta Racheva OH
- 32 Kalina Veneva OH
- 33 Kaya Nikolova MB
- 34 Dimana Ivanova S
- 35 Viktoria Ninova L

== Canada ==
The following was Canada's roster at the 2025 Women's Volleyball Nations League.

Head coach: (Italy) Giovanni Guidetti

- 1 Katerina Georgiadis L
- 2 Delaney Watson L
- 3 Kiera Van Ryk O
- 4 Vicky Savard OH
- 5 Julia Murmann L
- 6 Jazmine White MB
- 7 Layne Van Buskirk MB
- 11 Andrea Mitrovic OH
- 12 Raeven Chase MB
- 13 Brie O'Reilly S
- 14 Hilary Howe OH
- 15 Shainah Joseph O
- 16 Abagayle Guezen OH
- 17 Kacey Jost OH
- 18 Anna Smrek O
- 19 Emily Maglio MB
- 20 Lucy Borowski O
- 21 Taylor de Boer OH
- 22 Averie Allard S
- 23 Emma Boyd MB
- 25 Sydney Grills O
- 26 Quinn Pelland S
- 27 Nyadholi Thokbuom MB
- 28 Raya Surinx OH
- 30 Madyson Saris OH
- 32 Thana Fayad OH
- 34 Gabrielle Attieh OH
- 35 Isabella Noble S
- 37 Jessica Andrews MB
- 41 Lauren Attieh OH

== China ==
The following was China's roster at the 2025 Women's Volleyball Nations League.

Head coach: (China) Zhao Yong

- 1 Wu Mengjie OH
- 2 Zhuang Yushan OH
- 3 Tang Xin OH
- 4 Zou Jiaqi S
- 5 Yin Xiaolan S
- 6 Gong Xiangyu O
- 7 Wang Yuanyuan MB
- 8 Wan Ziyue MB
- 9 Shan Linqian MB
- 10 Yang Shuming O
- 11 Fan Boning O
- 12 Li Yingying OH
- 13 Dong Yuhan OH
- 14 Huang Yuexin OH
- 15 Chen Houyu MB
- 16 Wang Aoqian MB
- 17 Ni Feifan L
- 18 Wang Mengjie L
- 19 Zheng Xingyi L
- 20 Zhong Hui OH
- 21 Gao Yi MB
- 22 Zhou Yetong O
- 23 Zhang Zixuan S
- 24 Xu Xiaoting S

== Czech Republic ==
The following was Czech Republic's roster at the 2025 Women's Volleyball Nations League.

Head coach: (Greece) Ioannis Athanasopoulos

- 1 Ema Kneiflová MB
- 2 Eva Hodanová O
- 3 Elen Jedličková MB
- 4 Silvie Pavlová MB
- 5 Eva Svobodová OH
- 6 Helena Grozer OH
- 7 Magdalena Bukovská OH
- 8 Ela Koulisiani MB
- 9 Daniela Digrinová L
- 10 Kateřina Valková S
- 11 Veronika Dostálová L
- 12 Lucie Janská MB
- 13 Denisa Pavlíková OH
- 14 Lucie Kolářová OH
- 15 Magdaléna Jehlářová MB
- 16 Michaela Mlejnková OH
- 17 Klára Dítě OH
- 18 Joséfina Smolková OH
- 19 Kateřina Pelikánová S
- 20 Květa Grabovská S
- 21 Caroline Formánková O
- 22 Gabriela Orvošová O
- 23 Anna Pragerová S
- 24 Anna Semanová O
- 25 Monika Brancuská O
- 26 Lucie Blažková MB
- 27 Barbora Chaloupková L
- 28 Bára Rejmanová OH
- 29 Jana Fixová O

== Dominican Republic ==
The following was Dominican Republic's roster at the 2025 Women's Volleyball Nations League.

Head coach: (Brazil) Marcos Kwiek

- 1 Cándida Arias MB
- 2 Yaneirys Rodríguez L
- 3 Florangel Terrero MB
- 4 Vielka Peralta OH
- 5 Brenda Castillo L
- 6 Ariana Rodríguez S
- 7 Niverka Marte S
- 8 Alondra Tapia O
- 9 Angélica Hinojosa MB
- 10 Flormarie Heredia OH
- 11 Geraldine González MB
- 12 Yokaty Pérez S
- 13 Massiel Matos OH
- 14 Yanlis Féliz O
- 15 Madeline Guillén OH
- 16 Yonkaira Peña OH
- 17 Ailyn Liberato S
- 18 Camila de la Rosa S
- 19 Selanny Puente MB
- 20 Brayelin Martínez OH
- 21 Jineiry Martínez MB
- 22 Samaret Caraballo OH
- 23 Gaila González O
- 24 Natalia Martínez OH
- 25 Larysmer Martínez L
- 26 Iliana Rodríguez L

== France ==
The following was France's roster at the 2025 Women's Volleyball Nations League.

Head coach: (Spain) César Hernández

- 1 Héléna Cazaute OH
- 2 Nawelle Chouikh-Barbez OH
- 3 Amandine Giardino L
- 4 Lauralee Blanc S
- 6 Marina Pezelj OH
- 7 Iman Ndiaye O
- 9 Nina Stojiljković S
- 10 Fatoumata Fanguedou MB
- 11 Lucille Gicquel O
- 12 Cyrielle Depie O
- 13 Guewe Diouf OH
- 15 Amandha Sylves MB
- 18 Ève-Yorène Mathi S
- 21 Éva Elouga MB
- 35 Énora Danard-Selosse S
- 41 Marie Andriamaherizo MB
- 49 Victoria Foucher O
- 53 Maëva Schalk OH
- 54 Aurélia Ébatombo O
- 57 Chloé Mayer MB
- 63 Émilie Respaut S
- 68 Manon Jaegy L
- 75 Auriane Biemel L
- 78 Camille Massuel MB
- 83 Lila Girgenti O
- 88 Amélie Rotar O
- 91 Halimatou Bah OH
- 92 Naomi Ngolongolo MB
- 98 Sabine Haewegene OH
- 99 Juliette Gélin L

== Germany ==
The following was Germany's roster at the 2025 Women's Volleyball Nations League.

Head coach: (Italy) Giulio Bregoli

- 1 Vanessa Agbortabi OH
- 2 Pia Kästner S
- 3 Annie Cesar L
- 4 Anna Pogany L
- 5 Corina Glaab S
- 6 Antonia Stautz OH
- 7 Maria Tabacuks OH
- 8 Hannah Kohn S
- 9 Lina Alsmeier OH
- 10 Lena Stigrot OH
- 11 Pia Timmer OH
- 12 Hanna Orthmann OH
- 13 Emilia Weske O
- 14 Marie Schölzel MB
- 15 Romy Jatzko OH
- 16 Anastasia Cekulaev MB
- 17 Mia Kirchhoff O
- 18 Leana Grozer OH
- 19 Marie Hänle O
- 20 Lena Kindermann O
- 21 Camilla Weitzel MB
- 22 Monique Strubbe MB
- 23 Sarah Straube S
- 24 Patricia Nestler L
- 25 Celine Jebens O
- 26 Emilia Jordan S
- 30 Elena Kömmling OH
- 35 Luisa van Clewe MB
- 36 Lea Ambrosius MB
- 37 Lara-Marie Schaefer L

== Italy ==
The following was Italy's roster at the 2025 Women's Volleyball Nations League.

Head coach: (Argentina) (Italy) Julio Velasco

- 1 Anna Gray MB
- 2 Alice Degradi OH
- 3 Carlotta Cambi S
- 4 Rebecca Piva OH
- 5 Federica Squarcini MB
- 6 Monica De Gennaro L
- 7 Eleonora Fersino L
- 8 Alessia Orro S
- 9 Jennifer Boldini S
- 10 Benedetta Sartori MB
- 11 Anna Danesi MB
- 12 Giorgia Frosini O
- 14 Linda Nwakalor MB
- 15 Sara Panetoni L
- 16 Stella Nervini OH
- 17 Myriam Sylla OH
- 18 Paola Egonu O
- 19 Sarah Fahr MB
- 20 Chidera Blessing Eze S
- 21 Loveth Omoruyi OH
- 22 Gaia Giovannini OH
- 23 Ilenia Moro L
- 24 Ekaterina Antropova O
- 26 Martina Armini L
- 29 Alice Nardo OH
- 31 Alice Tanase OH
- 32 Adhuoljok Malual O
- 34 Rachele Morello S
- 35 Matilde Munarini MB
- 37 Merit Adigwe O

== Japan ==
The following was Japan's roster at the 2025 Women's Volleyball Nations League.

Head coach: (Turkey) Ferhat Akbaş

- 1 Koyomi Iwasaki S
- 2 Ayaka Araki MB
- 3 Haruyo Shimamura MB
- 4 Mayu Ishikawa OH
- 5 Miwako Osanai OH
- 6 Nanami Seki S
- 7 Tamaki Matsui S
- 8 Manami Kojima L
- 10 Ai Kurogo OH
- 11 Nichika Yamada MB
- 12 Satomi Fukudome L
- 13 Yukiko Wada OH
- 14 Fuyumi Hawi Okumu Oba OH
- 15 Airi Miyabe MB
- 16 Asuka Hamamatsu MB
- 17 Maki Yamaguchi MB
- 18 Hitomi Shiode S
- 19 Miiku Iwasawa L
- 20 Hiroyo Yamanaka MB
- 21 Minami Nishimura L
- 22 Tsukasa Nakagawa S
- 23 Haruna Kawabata L
- 24 Rui Nonaka OH
- 26 Yoshino Sato OH
- 27 Nanami Asano MB
- 28 Megumi Fukazawa OH
- 30 Ayane Kitamado OH
- 33 Miku Akimoto OH
- 34 Kokomi Kawamata OH
- 35 Mana Nishizaki L

== Netherlands ==
The following was Netherlands's roster at the 2025 Women's Volleyball Nations League.

Head coach: (Germany) Felix Koslowski

- 2 Marije ten Brinke MB
- 3 Hester Jasper L
- 4 Celeste Plak O
- 5 Jolien Knollema OH
- 8 Suus Gerritsen MB
- 9 Pippa Molenaar L
- 10 Sarah van Aalen S
- 11 Hyke Lyklema S
- 12 Britt Bongaerts S
- 13 Nicole van de Vosse O
- 16 Indy Baijens MB
- 17 Iris Vos OH
- 18 Marrit Jasper OH
- 19 Nika Daalderop OH
- 20 Helena Kok OH
- 21 Britte Stuut MB
- 22 Sanne Konijnenberg S
- 23 Eline Timmerman MB
- 24 Susan Schut OH
- 25 Florien Reesink L
- 26 Elles Dambrink O
- 27 Yfke Jelsma O
- 28 Jette Kuipers OH
- 29 Roos Wessels MB
- 30 Laura Jansen OH
- 32 Marit Zander S
- 33 Danique Hamming L
- 34 Laurine Geerdes O
- 35 Lette Wiegerinck MB
- 36 Pip Kok OH

== Poland ==
The following was Poland's roster at the 2025 Women's Volleyball Nations League.

Head coach: (Italy) Stefano Lavarini

- 1 Aleksandra Gryka MB
- 2 Julia Nowicka S
- 3 Magdalena Stysiak O
- 4 Marlena Kowalewska S
- 5 Agnieszka Korneluk MB
- 6 Anna Obiała MB
- 7 Karolina Drużkowska OH
- 8 Julita Piasecka OH
- 9 Natalia Murek OH
- 11 Martyna Łukasik OH
- 12 Aleksandra Szczygłowska L
- 13 Dominika Pierzchała MB
- 14 Julia Szczurowska O
- 15 Martyna Czyrniańska OH
- 16 Sonia Stefanik MB
- 17 Malwina Smarzek O
- 18 Justyna Łysiak L
- 19 Weronika Centka-Tietianiec MB
- 21 Alicja Grabka S
- 22 Julia Orzoł OH
- 23 Adriana Adamek L
- 24 Paulina Damaske OH
- 25 Klaudia Łyduch L
- 26 Katarzyna Wenerska S
- 30 Olivia Różański OH
- 31 Aleksandra Rasińska O
- 44 Agata Milewska MB
- 65 Martyna Borowczak OH
- 95 Magdalena Jurczyk MB

== Serbia ==
The following was Serbia's roster at the 2025 Women's Volleyball Nations League.

Head coach: (Serbia) Branko Kovačević, (Serbia) Zoran Terzić (Note: Kovačević was the head coach during week 1; that role was filled by Terzić for the rest of the tournament.)

- 2 Katarina Dangubić OH
- 3 Minja Osmajić MB
- 6 Jovana Kocić MB
- 7 Sara Ranković S
- 8 Slađana Mirković S
- 11 Hena Kurtagić MB
- 12 Teodora Pušić L
- 13 Nevena Sajić OH
- 14 Maja Aleksić MB
- 15 Aleksandra Uzelac OH
- 16 Aleksandra Jegdić L
- 17 Stefana Pakić L
- 18 Tijana Bošković O
- 19 Bojana Milenković OH
- 20 Jovana Zelenović O
- 21 Ana Malešević MB
- 23 Mila Đorđević S
- 24 Ljubica Milojević MB
- 25 Nina Čajić OH
- 26 Maša Kirov MB
- 27 Vanja Bukilić O
- 28 Marija Miljević S
- 29 Ksenija Tomić OH
- 30 Rada Perović S
- 31 Tara Taubner O
- 32 Bojana Gočanin L
- 34 Branka Tica OH
- 35 Mina Mijatović OH
- 40 Vanja Ivanović OH
- 41 Nataša Čikuc-Deans MB

== South Korea ==
The following was South Korea's roster at the 2025 Women's Volleyball Nations League.

Head coach: (Puerto Rico) Fernando Morales

- 1 Kim Da-eun O
- 2 Lee Ju-ah MB
- 3 Kim Da-in S
- 4 Han Da-hye L
- 5 Lee Jua OH
- 6 Lee Go-eun S
- 7 Kim Da-eun S
- 8 Kim Yeong-yeon L
- 9 Na Hyun-soo O
- 10 Park Sa-rang S
- 11 Yuk Seo-young OH
- 12 Lee Da-hyeon MB
- 13 Kim Se-been MB
- 14 Jeong Yun-ju OH
- 15 Lee Seon-woo O
- 16 Jeong Ji-yun OH
- 17 Jung Ho-young MB
- 18 Kwon Min-ji OH
- 19 Lee Han-bi OH
- 20 Yu Ga-ram L
- 21 Kim Ji-won S
- 22 Moon Jung-won L
- 23 Shin Eun-ji O
- 24 Kim Chae-won L
- 25 Park Eun-seo O
- 26 Park Eun-jin MB
- 33 Choi Jeong-min MB
- 47 Han Su-jin L
- 71 Moon Ji-yun O
- 97 Kang So-hwi OH

== Thailand ==
The following was Thailand's roster at the 2025 Women's Volleyball Nations League.

Head coach: (Thailand) Kiattipong Radchatagriengkai

- 1 Kalyarat Khamwong L
- 2 Piyanut Pannoy L
- 3 Pornpun Guedpard S
- 4 Donphon Sinpho OH
- 5 Thatdao Nuekjang MB
- 6 Warisara Seetaloed OH
- 7 Natthawan Phatthaisong O
- 8 Waruni Kanram MB
- 9 Jidapa Nahuanong L
- 10 Kanchana Sisaikaeo OH
- 11 Sasipaporn Janthawisut OH
- 12 Hattaya Bamrungsuk MB
- 13 Kanokporn Sangthong S
- 14 Kuttika Kaewpin OH
- 15 Natthanicha Jaisaen S
- 16 Pimpichaya Kokram O
- 17 Nannaphat Moonjakham O
- 18 Ajcharaporn Kongyot OH
- 19 Chatchu-on Moksri OH
- 20 Nattharika Wasan MB
- 21 Thanacha Sooksod O
- 22 Nichakorn Wansuk L
- 23 Natthimar Kubkaew O
- 24 Kanyarat Kunmuang MB
- 26 Nutchanat Homphithak OH
- 27 Supawadee Panwilai OH
- 28 Sasithorn Jetta MB
- 29 Wimonrat Thanaphan MB
- 33 Natnicha Saelao S
- 68 Wiranyupa Inchan O

== Turkey ==
The following was Turkey's roster at the 2025 Women's Volleyball Nations League.

Head coach: (Italy) Daniele Santarelli

- 1 Gizem Örge L
- 2 Simge Şebnem Aköz L
- 3 Cansu Özbay S
- 4 Melissa Vargas O
- 5 Ayça Aykaç L
- 6 Saliha Şahin OH
- 7 Hande Baladın OH
- 8 Sinead Jack Kısal MB
- 9 Meliha Diken OH
- 10 Ayçin Akyol MB
- 11 Derya Cebecioğlu OH
- 12 Elif Şahin S
- 13 Dilay Özdemir S
- 15 Deniz Uyanık MB
- 16 Berka Buse Özden MB
- 17 Sıla Çalışkan S
- 18 Zehra Güneş MB
- 19 Aslı Kalaç MB
- 20 Yaprak Erkek OH
- 21 Ayşe Çürük O
- 22 İlkin Aydın OH
- 23 Eylül Akarçeşme L
- 25 Bahar Akbay MB
- 28 Buse Ünal S
- 29 Defne Başyolcu O
- 41 Alexia Căruțașu O
- 55 Ege Melisa Bükmen OH
- 77 Tutku Burcu Yüzgenç O
- 88 Yasemin Güveli MB
- 99 Ebrar Karakurt OH

== United States ==
The following was United States's roster at the 2025 Women's Volleyball Nations League.

Head coach: (United States) Erik Sullivan

- 2 Jordyn Poulter S
- 3 Avery Skinner OH
- 5 Alexandra Frantti OH
- 6 Morgan Hentz L
- 7 Lexi Rodriguez L
- 8 Brionne Butler MB
- 9 Madisen Skinner OH
- 10 Jenna Gray S
- 11 Taylor Mims O
- 13 Amber Igiede MB
- 14 Annamarie Dodson MB
- 15 Rachel Fairbanks S
- 16 Dana Rettke MB
- 17 Zoe Fleck L
- 18 Asjia O'Neal MB
- 19 Khalia Lanier OH
- 20 Danielle Cuttino O
- 21 Veronica Jones-Perry OH
- 22 Sarah Franklin OH
- 23 Lauren Briseno L
- 24 Olivia Babcock O
- 25 Tia Jimerson MB
- 27 Ella Powell S
- 28 Logan Lednicky O
- 29 Molly McCage MB
- 30 McKenzie Adams OH
- 32 Saige Kaahaaina-Torres S
- 33 Logan Eggleston OH
- 34 Stephanie Samedy O
- 43 Serena Gray MB

== See also ==
- 2025 FIVB Men's Volleyball Nations League squads
- 2025 FIVB Women's Volleyball World Championship squads
- 2025 FIVB Men's Volleyball World Championship squads
