= 2026 FIVB Women's Volleyball Nations League squads =

This article shows the roster of all the participating teams at the 2026 FIVB Women's Volleyball Nations League. Each team names a full list of up to 30 players, but only 12 to 14 players can be used in a week, chosen from the full list.

== Belgium ==
The following was Belgium's roster at the 2026 Women's Volleyball Nations League.

Head coach: (Belgium) Kris Vansnick

- 1 Saar Bertels OH
- 2 Elise Van Sas S
- 3 Britt Herbots OH
- 4 Nathalie Lemmens MB
- 5 Tea Radovic OH
- 6 Helena Gilson OH
- 7 Anna Koulberg MB
- 8 Lara Nagels S
- 9 Nel Demeyer OH
- 10 Pauline Martin O
- 12 Charlotte Krenicky S
- 15 Jutta Van De Vyver S
- 16 Noor Debouck L
- 17 Yana Wouters MB
- 18 Britt Rampelberg L
- 19 Silke Van Avermaet MB
- 20 Britt Fransen MB
- 21 Janne Deleu OH
- 22 Liese Verhelst O
- 23 Pauline Luyten OH
- 24 Flore Maes MB
- 25 Eline Van Elsen OH
- 26 Sarah Hauben MB
- 27 Romane Neufkens S
- 28 Jasmine Debout L
- 29 Annelore Engels S
- 30 Lune Hoste OH
- 31 Ella Joosen OH
- 32 Ayiana Hall O
- 33 Emma Vanderschommen L

== Brazil ==
The following was Brazil's roster at the 2026 Women's Volleyball Nations League.

Head coach: (Brazil) José Roberto Guimarães

- 1 Bruna Costa S
- 2 Diana Duarte MB
- 3 Macris Carneiro S
- 4 Lorena Viezel MB
- 5 Natália Araújo L
- 6 Nyeme Costa L
- 7 Rosamaria Montibeller O
- 8 Júlia Kudiess MB
- 9 Roberta Ratzke S
- 10 Gabriela Guimarães OH
- 11 Luzia Nezzo MB
- 12 Sabrina Machado O
- 13 Vivan Lima S
- 14 Ana Cristina de Souza OH
- 15 Helena Wenk Hoengen OH
- 16 Kisy Nascimento O
- 17 Júlia Bergmann OH
- 18 Jheovana Sebastião O
- 19 Tainara Santos O
- 20 Maiara Basso OH
- 21 Karina Souza OH
- 22 Marcelle Arruda L
- 23 Drussyla Costa OH
- 24 Érica Motta Lima L
- 25 Jaqueline Schmitz O
- 26 Larissa Besen MB
- 27 Lanna Machado MB
- 28 Lívia Santos MB
- 29 Paulina de Souza L
- 30 Kenya Malachias S

== Bulgaria ==
The following was Bulgaria's roster at the 2026 Women's Volleyball Nations League.

Head coach: (Italy) Marcello Abbondanza

- 1 Denitsa Angelova MB
- 2 Gabriela Zhekova OH
- 3 Lora Slavcheva S
- 4 Venesa Radeva MB
- 5 Maria Koleva OH
- 6 Miroslava Paskova OH
- 7 Alexandra Kitipova OH
- 8 Dimana Ivanova S
- 9 Elena Becheva OH
- 10 Elena Kolarova MB
- 11 Maria Zlatanova OH
- 12 Maria-Magdalena Nedyalkova L
- 13 Mila Pashkuleva L
- 14 Borislava Saykova MB
- 15 Zhana Todorova L
- 16 Iva Dudova O
- 18 Darina Naneva MB
- 19 Aleksandra Milanova OH
- 20 Boryana Angelova MB
- 21 Monika Krasteva OH
- 23 Mikaela Stoyanova O
- 26 Tsvetelina Ilieva OH
- 28 Merelin Nikolova O
- 32 Kalina Veneva OH
- 33 Kaya Nikolova MB
- 35 Viktoria Ninova L
- 37 Viktoria Koeva OH
- 38 Stefani Dyankova S
- 40 Ivanina Malinova MB
- 66 Margarita Guncheva S

== Canada ==
The following was Canada's roster at the 2026 Women's Volleyball Nations League.

Head coach: (Italy) Giovanni Guidetti

- 1 Katerina Georgiadis L
- 2 Delaney Watson L
- 3 Kiera Van Ryk O
- 4 Vicky Savard OH
- 6 Jazmine White MB
- 9 Alexa Gray OH
- 10 Courtney Baker S
- 11 Andrea Mitrovic OH
- 13 Brie Fransen S
- 14 Hilary Johnson OH
- 15 Emoni Bush OH
- 16 Abagayle Guezen OH
- 17 Kacey Jost L
- 18 Anna Smrek O
- 19 Emily Maglio MB
- 20 Lucy Borowski O
- 21 Veronica Dickson MB
- 22 Olivia Andulajevic L
- 23 Emma Boyd MB
- 26 Quinn Pelland S
- 27 Nyadholi Thokbuom MB
- 28 Raya Surinx OH
- 29 Hannah Duchesneau OH
- 30 Madyson Saris OH
- 32 Thana Fayad OH
- 35 Isabella Noble S
- 37 Jessica Andrews MB
- 39 Justine Kolody S
- 42 Logan King O
- 43 Aimee Lemire OH

== China ==
The following was China's roster at the 2026 Women's Volleyball Nations League.

Head coach: (China) Zhao Yong

- 1 Wu Mengjie OH
- 2 Zhuang Yushan OH
- 3 Tang Xin OH
- 4 Zhang Zixuan S
- 5 Diao Linyu S
- 6 Gong Xiangyu O
- 7 Wang Yuanyuan MB
- 8 Chen Houyu MB
- 9 Wang Aoqian MB
- 10 Yang Shuming O
- 11 Li Chenxuan OH
- 12 Li Yingying OH
- 13 Dong Yuhan OH
- 14 Xie Shengyu S
- 15 Jin Jiabao MB
- 16 Guo Zhongnan MB
- 17 Ni Feifan L
- 18 Wang Mengjie L
- 19 Zhu Xingchen OH
- 20 Ji Yuxiao O
- 21 Gao Yi MB
- 22 Zhou Yetong O
- 23 Wang Yizhu OH
- 24 Xu Xiaoting S
- 25 Yang Hanyu MB
- 26 Wang Wenhan MB
- 27 Fan Boning OH
- 28 Wan Ziyu MB
- 29 Yin Xiaolan S
- 30 Zheng Xinyi L

== Czech Republic ==
The following was Czech Republic's roster at the 2026 Women's Volleyball Nations League.

Head coach: (Greece) Ioannis Athanasopoulos

- 1 Ema Kneiflová MB
- 2 Anna Kalinová S
- 3 Jana Fixová O
- 4 Silvie Pavlová MB
- 5 Eva Svobodová OH
- 6 Helena Grozer OH
- 7 Antonie Kelnárová OH
- 8 Ela Koulisiani MB
- 9 Daniela Digrinová L
- 10 Kateřina Valková S
- 11 Veronika Dostálová L
- 12 Justýna Nováková OH
- 13 Denisa Pavlíková OH
- 14 Lucie Kolářová L
- 15 Magdaléna Jehlářová MB
- 16 Michaela Mlejnková OH
- 17 Magdalena Bukovská OH
- 18 Pavla Šmídová S
- 19 Kateřina Pelikánová S
- 20 Květa Grabovská S
- 21 Anna Pragerová S
- 22 Gabriela Orvošová O
- 23 Petra Indrová OH
- 24 Lucie Janská MB
- 25 Monika Brancuská O
- 27 Barbora Chaloupková L
- 28 Bára Rejmanová OH
- 29 Joséfina Smolková OH

== Dominican Republic ==
The following was Dominican Republic's roster at the 2026 Women's Volleyball Nations League.

Head coach: (Brazil) Marcos Kwiek

- 2 Yaneirys Rodríguez L
- 4 Vielka Peralta OH
- 5 Brenda Castillo L
- 6 Ariana Rodríguez S
- 7 Niverka Marte S
- 8 Alondra Tapia O
- 9 Angelica Hinojosa MB
- 10 Flormarie Heredia OH
- 11 Geraldine González MB
- 12 Yokaty Pérez S
- 13 Massiel Matos OH
- 14 Yanlis Féliz O
- 15 Madeline Guillén OH
- 16 Yonkaira Peña Isabel OH
- 17 Crismeily Paniagua S
- 18 Camila de la Rosa S
- 19 Florangel Terrero MB
- 20 Brayelin Martínez OH
- 21 Jineiry Martínez MB
- 22 Samaret Caraballo OH
- 23 Gaila González O
- 24 Natalia Martínez OH
- 25 Larysmer Martínez L
- 27 Selanny Puente MB
- 28 Katielle Alonzo O
- 29 Kirssy Fernández L
- 30 Yalyn Filpo MB
- 31 Rayni Mondesi O
- 32 Ailyn Liberato S

== France ==
The following was France's roster at the 2026 Women's Volleyball Nations League.

Head coach: (Spain) César Hernández

- 1 Héléna Cazaute OH
- 2 Nawelle Chouikh-Barbez OH
- 4 Lilou Ratahiry OH
- 5 Auriane Biemel L
- 6 Charlotte Cuette OH
- 7 Iman Ndiaye O
- 8 Maéva Schalk OH
- 9 Nina Stojiljković S
- 10 Fatoumata Fanguedou MB
- 12 Naomi Ngolongolo MB
- 15 Amandha Sylves MB
- 16 Juliette Fidon OH
- 17 Lauralee Blanc S
- 18 Ève-Yorène Mathi S
- 19 Cyrielle Depie O
- 20 Judith Brunier-Balandras MB
- 21 Éva Elouga MB
- 25 Jade Cholet OH
- 27 Rita Sebiti MB
- 29 Léna Chameaux S
- 35 Énora Danard-Selosse S
- 41 Maëlys Agnèse L
- 59 Jade Defraeye MB
- 68 Manon Jaegy L
- 77 Fétia-Héré Rovira O
- 78 Camille Massuel MB
- 83 Émilie Respaut S
- 88 Amélie Rotar OH
- 91 Halimatou Bah OH
- 99 Juliette Gelin L

== Germany ==
The following was Germany's roster at the 2026 Women's Volleyball Nations League.

Head coach: (Italy) Giulio Bregoli

- 1 Patricia Nestler L
- 3 Annie Cesar L
- 5 Corina Glaab S
- 6 Antonia Stautz OH
- 7 Maria Tabacuks OH
- 8 Hannah Kohn S
- 9 Lina Alsmeier OH
- 11 Pia Timmer OH
- 12 Hanna Orthmann OH
- 13 Emilia Weske O
- 14 Marie Schölzel MB
- 15 Romy Jatzko OH
- 16 Anastasia Cekulaev MB
- 17 Isabel Martin OH
- 18 Leana Grozer OH
- 19 Emma Sambale L
- 20 Lena Kindermann O
- 21 Camilla Weitzel MB
- 22 Monique Strubbe MB
- 23 Sarah Straube S
- 24 Laura Berger MB
- 25 Mette Pfeffer MB
- 26 Emilia Jordan S
- 27 Amelie Strothoff OH
- 29 Lotte Goertz L
- 31 Mia Kirchhoff O
- 32 Celine Jebens O
- 33 Lena Schultze OH
- 34 Franziska Heil MB
- 35 Luisa van Clewe MB

== Italy ==
The following was Italy's roster at the 2026 Women's Volleyball Nations League.

Head coach: (Argentina) (Italy) Julio Velasco

- 2 Denise Meli MB
- 3 Carlotta Cambi S
- 4 Alice Tanase OH
- 5 Ilaria Spirito L
- 6 Dalila Marchesini MB
- 7 Eleonora Fersino L
- 8 Alessia Orro S
- 9 Yasmina Akrari MB
- 10 Ilenia Moro L
- 11 Anna Danesi MB
- 12 Giorgia Frosini O
- 14 Linda Nwakalor MB
- 15 Merit Adigwe O
- 16 Stella Nervini OH
- 17 Myriam Sylla OH
- 18 Paola Egonu O
- 19 Sarah Fahr MB
- 20 Chidera Eze S
- 21 Loveth Omoruyi OH
- 22 Gaia Giovannini OH
- 24 Ekaterina Antropova OH
- 25 Linda Manfredini MB
- 27 Binto Diop O
- 28 Asia Bonelli S
- 29 Francesca Scola S
- 30 Katja Eckl MB
- 31 Josephine Obossa O
- 32 Federica Pelloni L
- 33 Alessia Bolzonetti OH
- 34 Alice Nardo OH

== Japan ==
The following was Japan's roster at the 2026 Women's Volleyball Nations League.

Head coach: (Turkey) Ferhat Akbaş

- 1 Yukiko Wada OH
- 2 Ayaka Araki MB
- 3 Haruyo Shimamura MB
- 4 Mayu Ishikawa OH
- 5 Yoshino Sato OH
- 6 Nanami Seki S
- 7 Erika Sakae S
- 8 Manami Kojima L
- 9 Miiku Iwasawa L
- 10 Tsukasa Nakagawa S
- 11 Nichika Yamada MB
- 12 Satomi Fukudome L
- 13 Maki Yamaguchi MB
- 14 Hitomi Shiode S
- 15 Airi Miyabe MB
- 16 Hinata Shigihara OH
- 17 Miyu Kawazoe OH
- 18 Ameze Miyabe OH
- 19 Mana Nishizaki L
- 21 Ai Hirota OH
- 22 Ayane Kitamado OH
- 23 Miina Inoue MB
- 24 Chisato Hanaoka S
- 26 Miku Akimoto OH
- 29 Moeka Kinoe MB
- 30 Mikoto Shima OH
- 31 Tamaki Matsui S
- 32 Minami Nishimura L

== Netherlands ==
The following was Netherlands's roster at the 2025 Women's Volleyball Nations League.

Head coach: (Germany) Felix Koslowski

- 2 Marije ten Brinke MB
- 3 Hester Jasper L
- 5 Jolien Knollema OH
- 6 Nova Marring OH
- 8 Suus Gerritsen MB
- 9 Pippa Molenaar L
- 10 Sarah van Aalen S
- 11 Laura Jansen OH
- 12 Britt Bongaerts S
- 14 Nicole van de Vosse O
- 16 Indy Baijens MB
- 17 Iris Vos OH
- 18 Marrit Jasper OH
- 19 Nika Daalderop OH
- 20 Helena Kok OH
- 21 Britte Stuut MB
- 22 Sanne Konijnenberg S
- 23 Eline Timmerman MB
- 24 Fleur Savelkoel OH
- 25 Florien Reesink L
- 26 Elles Dambrink O
- 27 Yfke Jelsma O
- 28 Jette Kuipers OH
- 29 Roos Wessels MB
- 30 Pleun van der Pijl OH
- 31 Susan Dambrink MB
- 32 Marit Zander S
- 33 Luna Strikwerda S
- 34 Saar Meijer L
- 35 Pip Kok OH

== Poland ==
The following was Poland's roster at the 2026 Women's Volleyball Nations League.

Head coach: (Italy) Stefano Lavarini

- 1 Julia Szczurowska O
- 2 Marta Orzyłowska MB
- 3 Magdalena Stysiak O
- 4 Nadia Siuda S
- 5 Aleksandra Rasińska O
- 6 Anna Obiała MB
- 7 Natasza Ornoch OH
- 8 Julita Piasecka OH
- 9 Natalia Murek OH
- 10 Klaudia Łyduch L
- 11 Martyna Łukasik OH
- 12 Aleksandra Szczygłowska L
- 14 Monika Lampkowska OH
- 15 Martyna Czyrniańska OH
- 16 Sonia Stefanik MB
- 18 Justyna Łysiak L
- 19 Julia Orzoł OH
- 20 Rozalia Moszyńska MB
- 21 Alicja Grabka S
- 22 Weronika Szlagowska OH
- 23 Gabriela Makarowska-Kulej S
- 24 Paulina Damaske OH
- 26 Katarzyna Wenerska S
- 28 Oliwia Sieradzka O
- 31 Natalia Kecher MB
- 32 Maja Koput MB
- 61 Natalia Dróżdż MB
- 77 Karolina Pancewicz L
- 95 Magdalena Jurczyk MB
- 98 Julia Bińczycka S

== Serbia ==
The following was Serbia's roster at the 2026 Women's Volleyball Nations League.

Head coach: (Serbia) Zoran Terzić

- 1 Vanja Ivanović OH
- 3 Minja Osmajić MB
- 4 Milica Medved L
- 5 Mina Popović MB
- 7 Jelena Delić MB
- 8 Slađana Mirković S
- 9 Rada Perović S
- 10 Maja Ognjenović S
- 11 Hena Kurtagić MB
- 13 Anja Zubić OP
- 14 Maja Aleksić MB
- 15 Aleksandra Uzelac OH
- 16 Aleksandra Jegdić L
- 17 Stefana Pakić L
- 18 Tijana Bošković O
- 21 Ana Malešević MB
- 24 Ljubica Milojević MB
- 25 Nina Čajić OH
- 26 Maša Kirov MB
- 27 Vanja Bukilić O
- 28 Marija Miljević S
- 29 Ana Jakšić S
- 30 Nađa Antonović OH
- 31 Jovana Cvetković OH
- 32 Bojana Gočanin L
- 33 Tara Taubner O
- 34 Branka Tica OH
- 35 Mina Mijatović OH
- 41 Nataša Čikuc-Deans MB
- 42 Ana Mihajlović OH

== Thailand ==
The following was Thailand's roster at the 2026 Women's Volleyball Nations League.

Head coach: (Thailand) Kiattipong Radchatagriengkai

- 2 Piyanut Pannoy L
- 3 Pornpun Guedpard S
- 4 Kanyarat Khunmuang MB
- 5 Thatdao Nuekjang MB
- 6 Warisara Seetaloed OH
- 7 Papatchaya Phontham O
- 8 Waruni Kanram MB
- 9 Kalyarat Khamwong L
- 10 Nannaphat Moonjakham O
- 11 Sasipaporn Janthawisut OH
- 12 Hattaya Bamrungsuk MB
- 13 Kanokporn Sangthong S
- 14 Kuttika Kaewpin OH
- 15 Natthanicha Jaisaen S
- 16 Pimpichaya Kokram O
- 17 Chuleeporn Ritwisat MB
- 18 Ajcharaporn Kongyot OH
- 19 Chatchu-on Moksri OH
- 20 Supawadee Phunwilai O
- 21 Thipsuda Bualai MB
- 22 Nirarach Srikuta OH
- 23 Nattharika Wasan MB
- 24 Sasithorn Jatta MB
- 26 Kantima Aekpatcha OH
- 27 Kanchana Sisaikaeo OH
- 28 Serah Ankomah S
- 29 Wimonrat Thanapan MB
- 30 Jidapa Nahuanong L
- 33 Natnicha Saelao S
- 41 Kaewkalaya Kamulthala MB

== Turkey ==
The following was Turkey's roster at the 2026 Women's Volleyball Nations League.

Head coach: (Italy) Daniele Santarelli

- 1 Gizem Örge L
- 3 Cansu Özbay S
- 4 Melissa Vargas O
- 5 Melis Yılmaz L
- 6 Saliha Şahin OH
- 7 Hande Baladın OH
- 8 Sinead Jack-Kısal MB
- 10 Eylül Yatgın L
- 12 Elif Şahin S
- 13 Dilay Özdemir S
- 15 Deniz Uyanık MB
- 16 Berka Buse Özden MB
- 17 Tutku Burcu Yüzgenç O
- 18 Zehra Güneş MB
- 19 Aslı Kalaç MB
- 20 Yaprak Erkek OH
- 21 Ayşe Çürük O
- 22 İlkin Aydın OH
- 23 Liza Safronova OH
- 27 Ezel Balık MB
- 28 Buse Ünal S
- 33 Merve Izbilir L
- 34 Beren Yeşilırmak O
- 44 Karmen Aksoy MB
- 51 Arelya Karasoy S
- 57 Merve Atlıer MB
- 77 Aylin Uysalcan OH
- 88 Yasemin Güveli MB
- 91 Defne Başyolcu O
- 99 Ebrar Karakurt OH

== Ukraine ==
The following was Ukraine's roster at the 2026 Women's Volleyball Nations League.

Head coach: (Poland) Jakub Głuszak

- 1 Oleksandra Milenko OH
- 2 Diana Meliushkyna MB
- 3 Kateryna Zhylinska MB
- 4 Alika Lutsenko L
- 6 Andriana Pavlyk OH
- 7 Switłana Dorsman MB
- 8 Polina Herasymchuk MB
- 9 Stanislava Parfonova S
- 10 Valeriia Nudha OH
- 11 Viktoriia Danchak O
- 13 Marta Fedyk OH
- 14 Daria Sharhorodska S
- 16 Kira Lisova O
- 17 Olena Napalkova S
- 18 Mariia Kaplanska OH
- 19 Anna Artyshuk O
- 20 Anastasiia Maievska MB
- 21 Kima Zharkova MB
- 22 Arina Boiko L
- 23 Yuliia Dymar OH
- 24 Anna Kharchynska O
- 25 Diana Holod S
- 26 Uliana Kotar MB
- 27 Oleksandra Kutniakova L
- 28 Dariia Kaplanska OH
- 29 Mariia Rybolovlieva MB
- 30 Oleksandra Molchanova S
- 32 Maryna Fedchuk O
- 33 Valeriia Yakusheva OH
- 34 Kateryna Huseinova S

== United States ==
The following was United States's roster at the 2026 Women's Volleyball Nations League.

Head coach: (United States) Erik Sullivan

- 1 Micha Hancock S
- 2 Jordyn Poulter S
- 3 Avery Skinner OH
- 5 Kendall Kipp O
- 6 Morgan Hentz L
- 7 Asjia O'Neal MB
- 8 Lexi Rodriguez L
- 9 Madisen Skinner O
- 10 Simone Lee-Wank OH
- 11 Saige Ka'aha'aina-Torres S
- 12 Jordan Thompson O
- 14 Anna Hall MB
- 16 Dana Rettke MB
- 17 Kamerynn Miner S
- 18 Elena Scott L
- 19 Elena Oglivie L
- 20 Rachel Fairbanks S
- 21 Claire Hoffman OH
- 22 Sarah Franklin OH
- 24 Chiaka Ogbogu MB
- 25 Kara Hallock OH
- 26 Anna Dodson MB
- 27 Madison Kubik-Banks OH
- 29 Molly McCage MB
- 33 Logan Eggleston OH
- 34 Stephanie Samedy O
- 35 Olivia Babcock O
- 44 Torrey Stafford OH
- 77 Samantha Francis MB
- 99 Caitlin Baird OH

== See also ==
- 2026 FIVB Men's Volleyball Nations League squads
