= Ezel Balık =

Turkish volleyball player (born 2009)

Personal information
- Born: 20 October 2009 (age 17); Tepebaşı, Eskişehir, Turkey
- Height: 1.95 m (6 ft 5 in)
- Weight: 80 kg (176 lb)
- Spike: 325 cm (128 in)
- Block: 315 cm (124 in)

Volleyball information
- Position: Middle blocker
- Current club: Eczacıbaşı Dynavit

Career
Years
- 2023–26
- 2023–26
- 2024–26
- 2025–
Teams
- Eczacıbaşı U16
- Eczacıbaşı U18
- Eczacıbaşı II
- Eczacıbaşı Dynavit

National team
- 2024
- 2025
- 2026-
- Turkey youth
- Turkey U21
- Turkey
Honours
Women's volleyball
Representing Turkey
FIVB Nations League
Gold medal – first place	2026 Macau	Team
Women's U21 Balkan Championship
Gold medal – first place	2025 Tirana	Team

Ezel Balık (born 20 October 2009) is a Turkish volleyball player. She is 195 cm (6 ft 5 in) tall at 80 kg (180 lb) and plays in the middle blocker position. She is right-handed, has 325 cm (128 in) spike height and 315 cm (124 in) block height. She plays for Eczacıbaşı Dynavit. Balık played first in the girls' youth national team in 2022, and debuted in the women's national team in 2026.

== Club career ==
Balık started her volleyboll playing career entering Eczacıbaşı SK in 2023. She played for the U16, U18 and reserve teams of Eczacıbaşı Volleyball before she was included in the senior women's team in May 2026 for the 2026–27 Turkish Women's Volleyball League season.

With the youth teams of Eczacıbaşı Volleyball, she won many medals, so gold medals in the Istanbul Women' U16 Super League (2023–24, 2024–25, 2025–26), Istanbul Women' U18 Super League (2024–25), Turkish Women's U16 Championship (2023–24, 2024–25), Turkish Women's Volleyball Second League ( 2024–25) and the silver medal in the Turkish Women's U18 Championship ( 2024–25).

== International career ==
Balık was part of the girls' youth national team at the 2024 FIVB Volleyball Girls' U17 World Championship in Lima, Peru, which her team finished seventh.

With the national U21 team, she captured the gold medal at the 2025 Women's U21 Balkan Volleyball Championship in Tirana, Albania

She was included in the Turkey women's national volleyball team to play at the 2026 FIVB Women's Volleyball Nations League in Brasília, Brazil.

== Personal life ==
Ezel Balık was born in Tepebaşı, Eskişehir on 20 October 2009.

== Honours ==
=== Club ===
Eczacıbaşı Volleyball

Turkish Women's Volleyball Second League
(gold) (1): 2024–25

Turkish Women's U18 Championship
(silver) (1): 2024–25

Turkish Women's U16 Championship
(gold) (2): 2023–24, 2024–25
Istanbul Women' U18 Super League
(gold) (1): 2024–25

Istanbul Women' U16 Super League
(gold) (3): 2023–24, 2024–25, 2025–26

=== International ===
Turkey U21
(gold) (1): 2025 Women's U21 Balkan Volleyball Championship
