= Kuzeyboru GSK =

Women's volleyball club in Turkey

- Full name: Kuzeyboru Gençlik ve Spor Kulübü
- Short name: Kuzeyboru
- Founded: 10 October 2017; 8 years ago
- Ground: Aksaray Atatürk Sports Hall
- Manager: (Italy) Lorenzo Pintus
- League: Turkish Women's Volleyball League
- 2025–26: 9th
- Website: kuzeyboruspor.com

Uniforms
| Home | Away |

Kuzeyboru GSK (Turkish: Kuzeyboru Gençlik ve Spor Kulübü), shortly Kuzeyboru, is a Turkish women's volleyball club based in Aksaray. It was founded on 10 October 2017, and is owned by the same-named pipe producer. The team compete in the top-level Turkish Women's Volleyball League.

== History ==
Kuzeyboru GSK was established by the founding members of the pipe producing company Kuzeyboru Inc. in Central Anatolian city Aksaray on 10 October 2017.

The team finished their first season, the 2017–18 in the Turkish Women's Volleyball Regional League, as champion, and was promoted to the Turkish Women's Volleyball Second League. In the 2018–19 Second League season, they became runner-up, and was promoted to the Turkish Women's Volleyball First League. The team, consisting of 13 Turkish, one Croatioan and one Bosnian and Herzegovinan, completed Group B of the 2019–20 Fitst League season in second place. They were promoted to the topflight Turkish Women's Volleyball League, nicknamed the "Sultans League" although the play-off matches were cancelled due to COVID-19 pandemic in Turkey. In the 2020–21 Sultans League season, one American and one Canadian player joined the team. In the 2021–22 Sultans League season, one Uktainian and one German player of national teams were transferred to strengthen the squad. For the 2022–23 Sultans League season, national team players from Azerbaijan, Belarus, Bulgaria and Brazil joined the team. In the 2023–24 Sultans League season, there were as foreign players one from Dominican Republic, one from Bosnia and Herzegovina and one from the US in addition to eleven domestic players.

Following promotion to the Sultans League, the team participated every season at the Turkish Women's Volleyball Cup. The team competed at the 2024–25 Women's CEV Cup, advanced to the play-offs, and placed 9th after losing the Golden set game in the play-offs.

In July 2025, Kuzeyboru Club acquired the rights of the Ankara-based volleyball club ALS Halk to play in the Turkish Women's Volleyball First League, and established its second team, Kuzeyboru II, to compete in the First League offering a great opportunity for young players.

== Arena ==
Kuzeyboru play their home matches at Aksaray Atatürk Sports Hall.

== League standing history ==
| Season | League | Rank |
|---|---|---|
| 2017–18 | Regional | 1st place, gold medalist(s) |
| 2018–19 | Second | 2nd place, silver medalist(s) |
| 2019–20 | First | (bronze) (^{1}) |
| 2020–21 | Sultans | 11th |
| 2021–22 | Sultans | 8th |
| 2022–23 | Sultans | 10th |
| 2023–24 | Sultans | 5th |
| 2024–25 | Sultans | 7th |
| 2025–26 | Sultans | 9th |

Legend:

- (^{1}): Season could not be completed due to COVID-19 pandemic in Turkey.

== Team roster 2026–27 ==
- Head coach: (Italy) Lorenzo Pintus

| No. | Player | Date of Birth | Height (m) | Position | Country |
|---|---|---|---|---|---|
| 1 | Julia Szczurowska | 29 July 2001 (age 25) | 1.91 | Opposite hitter | Poland |
| 2 | Buse Kayacan Sonsırma | 15 July 1992 (age 34) | 1.76 | Libero | Turkey |
| 4 | Tuğba Şenoğlu İvegin | 2 February 1998 (age 28) | 1.84 | Outside hitter | Turkey |
| 5 | Ergül Avcı Eroğlu | 24 July 1987 (age 39) | 1.90 | Middle blocker | Turkey |
| 7 | Yaren Işık | 2 March 2002 (age 24) | 1.86 | Middle blocker | Turkey |
| 10 | Tutku Burcu Yüzgenç | 16 January 1999 (age 27) | 1.92 | Opposite hitter | Turkey |
| 11 | Gamze Kılıç | 20 December 1993 (age 32) | 1.79 | Setter | Turkey |
| 12 | Wilmarie Rivera | 14 February 1997 (age 29) | 1.78 | Setter | Puerto Rico |
| 15 | Martyna Czyrniańska | 13 October 2003 (age 22) | 1.93 | Outside hitter | Poland |
| 17 | Margarita Kurilo | 21 June 1993 (age 33) | 1.85 | Outside hitter | Russia |
| 18 | Mayany de Souza | 24 November 1996 (age 29) | 1.87 | Middle blocker | Brazil |
| 21 | Ayşe Çürük | 4 October 2001 (age 24) | 1.84 | Outside hitter | Turkey |
| 23 | Gülce Güçtekin | 10 October 2002 (age 23) | 1.65 | Libero | Turkey |

== Former notable players ==
Brazil

- Ana Beatriz Corrêa

Bulgaria

- Nasya Dimitrova

Croatia

- Matea Ikić

Dominican Republic

- Gaila González

Germany

- Ivana Vanjak

Poland

- Malwina Smarzek

Russia

- Anna Lazareva

Serbia

- Sara Lozo

Turkey

- Merve Atlıer
- Ege Melisa Bükmen
- Ceren Nur Domaç
- Dilek Kınık Ekşi
- Büşra Güneş
- Büşra Kılıçlı
- Güldeniz Önal

Ukraine

- Olesia Rykhliuk

United States

- Sarah Wilhite Parsons

Vietnam

- Trần Thị Thanh Thúy
