= Ayşe Çürük =

Turkish volleyball player (born 2001)

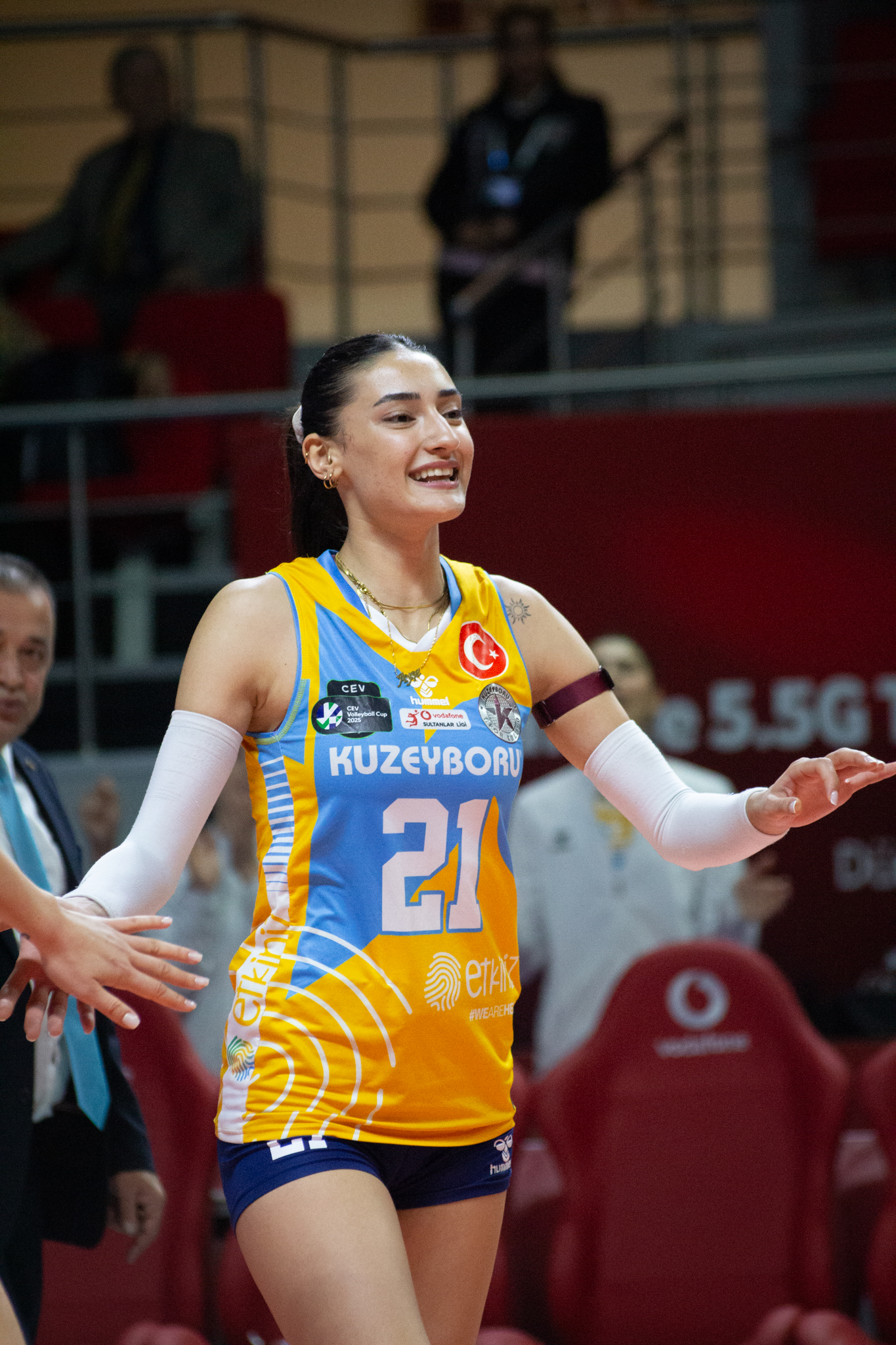
- Ayşe Çürük of Kuzeyboru (2025)

Personal information
- Born: 4 October 2001 (age 25); Turkey
- Height: 1.87 m (6 ft 1 1/2 in)
- Weight: 65 kg (143 lb)
- Spike: 298 cm (117 in)
- Block: 297 cm (117 in)

Volleyball information
- Position: Outside hitter
- Current club: (Turkey) Kuzeyboru
- Number: 14

Career
Years	Teams
2015–2018	(Turkey) Mersin Üniversiyesi
2018–2019	(Turkey) TVF Sport High School
2019–2020	(Turkey) Türk Hava Yolları
2019–2020	(Turkey) Edremit Bld.
2020–2021	(Turkey) İstanbul Büyükşehir Bld.
2021–2023	(Turkey) Muratpaşa Bld. Açı Koleji
2023–2024	(Turkey) Aydın Büyükşehir Bld.
2024–	(Turkey) Kuzeyboru

National team
2025–	Turkey
Honours
Women's volleyball
Representing Turkey
FIVB Nations League
Gold medal – first place	2026 Macau	Team
Islamic Solidarity Games
Gold medal – first place	2025 Rıyadh	Team

Ayşe Çürük (born 4 October 2001) is a Turkish professional volleyball player. She plays in the outside hitter position. Currently, she plays for Kuzeyboru, and is a member of the Turkey women's national volleyball team.

== Personal life ==
Ayşe Çürük was born on 4 October 2001.

== Club career ==
She is 1.87 m (6 ft 1 1/2 in) tall, and plays in the outside hitter position. She draws attention especially with her effective dunks in offense and her agility in defense.

Çürük started her career at an early age at Mersin Üniversitesi in 2015. After playing three season, she moved to Ankara, and entered TVF Sport High School, the vocational school of the Turkish Volleyball Federation, and played in the school team in the 2018–19 season. Following graduation, she joined Türk Hava Yolları in the 2019–20 season, and played also for Edremit Bld. After one season at İstanbul Büyükşehir Bld., she transferred to Muratpaşa Bld. Açı Koleji, where she played from 2021 to 2023. In the 2023–24 season, she was with Aydın Büyükşehir Bld. In 2024, she transferred to the Aksaray-based club Kuzeyboru. With Kuzeyboru, she took part at the 2024–25 Women's CEV Cup.

== International career ==
Çürük was selected to the Turkey women's national volleyball team to play at the 2025 FIVB Women's Volleyball Nations League.

She was part of the Turkey team, which became champion at the 2025 Islamic Solidarity Games in Riyadh, Saudi Arabia.

== Honours ==
Turkey
(gold) 2025 Islamic Solidarity Games
