= Tutku Burcu Yüzgenç =

Turkish volleyball player (born 1999)

Personal information
- Born: 15 January 1999 (age 27) Ankara, Turkey
- Height: 192 cm (6 ft 4 in)
- Weight: 70 kg (154 lb)
- Spike: 310 cm (122 in)
- Block: 300 cm (118 in)

Volleyball information
- Position: Opposite hitter
- Current club: Kuzeyboru

Career
- Years: Team
- 2015–2019; 2019; 2019–2021; 2021–2022; 2022–2024; 2024–2025; 2025–2026; 2026–: Halkbank Ankara; PTT Spor; Karayolları; Fenerbahçe; Palmberg Schwerin; Pink Spiders; AEK Athens; Kuzeyboru
Honours
Women's volleyball
Representing Turkey
FIVB Nations League
Gold medal – first place	2026 Macau	Team
Mediterranean Games
Silver medal – second place	2022 Oran	Team

Tutku Burcu Yüzgenç (born 15 January 1999) is a Turkish professional volleyball player. She plays in the opposite hitter position for Kuzeyboru, and is a member of the Turkey women's national volleyball team.

== Club career ==
Yüzgenç started her voleyball playing career in the Gazi Üniversitesi Sports Club in her hometown. At the age of sixteen only, she was included in the A team of Halkbank Ankara, where she played four seasons. In the next two seasons, she was in Ankara with PTT Spor and Karayolları. In April 2021, she transferred to Fenerbahçe. In June 2022, she moved to Germany, and played two seasons for Palmberg Schwerin. In 2024, she went to South Korea, and signed with Pink Spiders, which finished the 2024–25 season as champion. In June 2025, she moved to Greece to play for AEK Athens. After one season, she returned home, and joined the Aksaray-based club Kuzeyboru.

She plays in the opposite hitter position, and is 192 cm (6 ft 3 1/2 in) tall at 70 kg (150 lb). She has 310 cm (120 in) spike and 300 cm (120 in) block height.

== International career ==
With the Turkey women's U18 team, Yüzgenç became champion at the 2015 European Youth Summer Olympic Festival in Tbilisi, Georgia.

In 2016, she played at the CEV Women's U19 Volleyball European Championship in Slovakia, and took the bronze medal as captain of the Turkey women's U19 team.

She was part of the Turkey women's national volleyball team, which won the silver medal at the 2022 Mediterranean Games in Oran, Algeria. She was included in the broad squad of the national team for participation at the 2025 FIVB Women's Volleyball Nations League.

== Personal life ==
Tutku Burcu Yüzgenç was born in Ankara, Turkey, on 15 January 1999.

,== Honours ==

=== Club ===
PTT Spor

Turkish Women's Volleyball First League
(gold) (1): 2018–19

Fenerbahçe

Turkish Women's Volleyball League
(silver) (1): 2021–22

Turkish Women's Volleyball Cup
(silver) (1): 2021–22

FIVB Women's Volleyball Club World Championship
(bronze) (1): 2021

CEV Women's Champions League
(bronze) (1): 2021–22

Palmberg Schwerin

German Women's Volleyball League
(silver) (1): 2023/2024
(bronze) (1): 2022/2023

German Women's Volleyball Cup
(gold) (1): 2022/2023

German Women's Volleyball Super Cup
(silver) (1): 2023/2024

Pink Spiders

South Korean V-League
(gold) (1): 2024–25

AEK Athens

Balkan Women's Volleyball Club Cup
(gold) (1): 2025–26

=== International ===
Turkey U18

European Youth Summer Olympic Festival
(gold) (1): 2015

Turkey U19

CEV Women's U19 Volleyball European Championship
(bronze) (1): 2016

Turkey

Mediterranean Games
(silver) (1): 2022

=== Individual ===
Best Opposite hitter (1)

2016 Balkan Women's U16 Volleyball Championship Cup (Turkey U16)

Best Outside hitter (1)

2015 Girls' Youth European Volleyball Championship (Turkey U18)
