= Dilek Kınık =

Turkish volleyball player (born 1995)

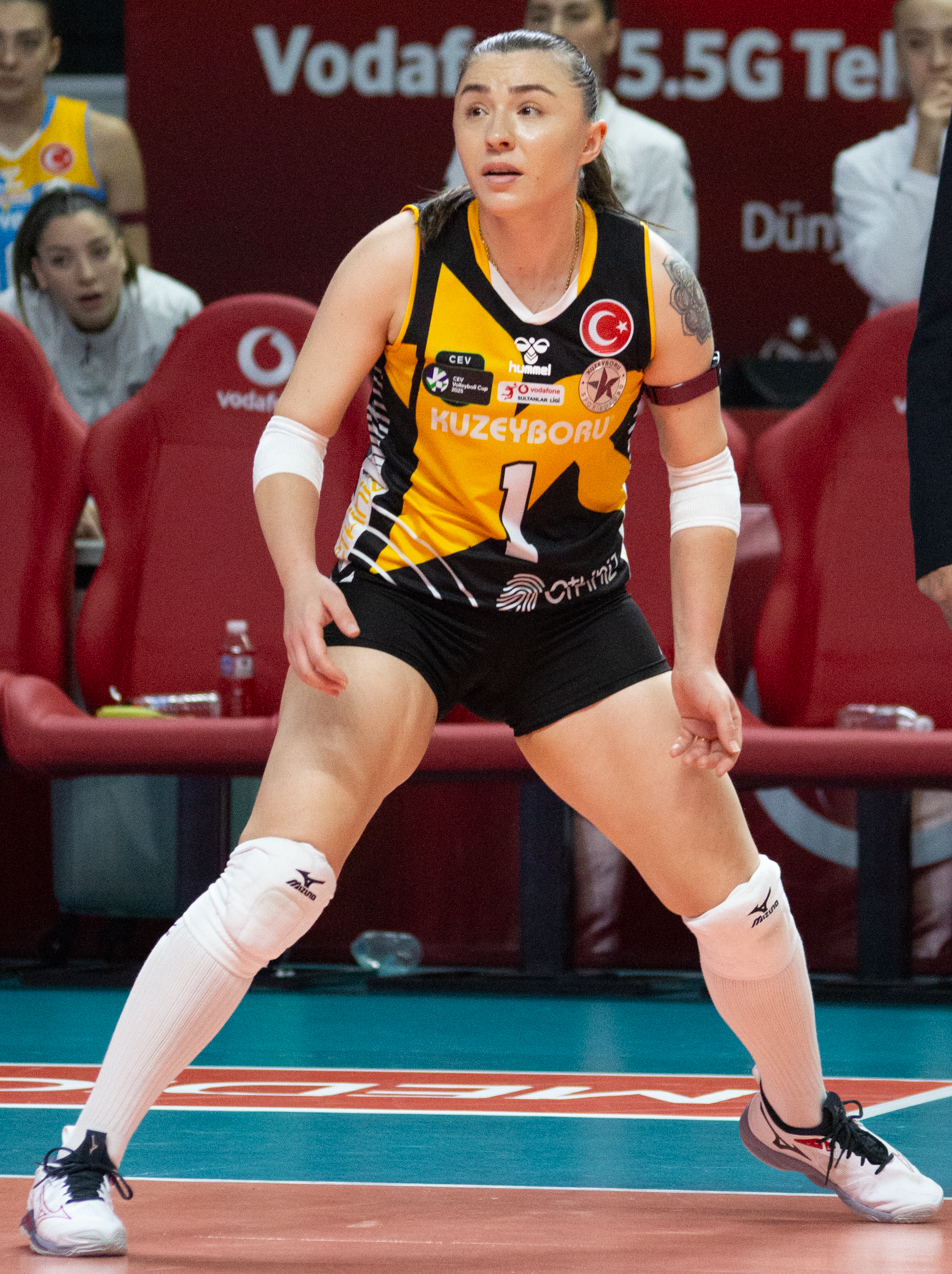

Personal information
- Born: 1995 (age 30–31)
- Height: 1.68 m (5 ft 6 in)

Volleyball information
- Position: Libero
- Current club: Kuzeyboru
- Number: 1

Dilek Kınık (born 1995 in Ankara, Turkey) is a Turkish female volleyball player. She is 168 cm (5.51 ft) tall and plays as a libero. She plays for Vakıfbank Spor Kulübü and wears the number 1.

== Clubs ==
- (Turkey) VakıfBank Güneş Sigorta Türk Telekom (2010- )

== Awards ==
=== Clubs ===
- 2012-13 Turkish Cup - Champion, with Vakıfbank Spor Kulübü
- 2012–13 CEV Champions League - Champion, with Vakıfbank Spor Kulübü
- 2012-13 Turkish Women's Volleyball League - Champion, with Vakıfbank Spor Kulübü

== See also ==
- Turkish women in sports
