= Berka Buse Özden =

Turkish volleyball player (born 2004)

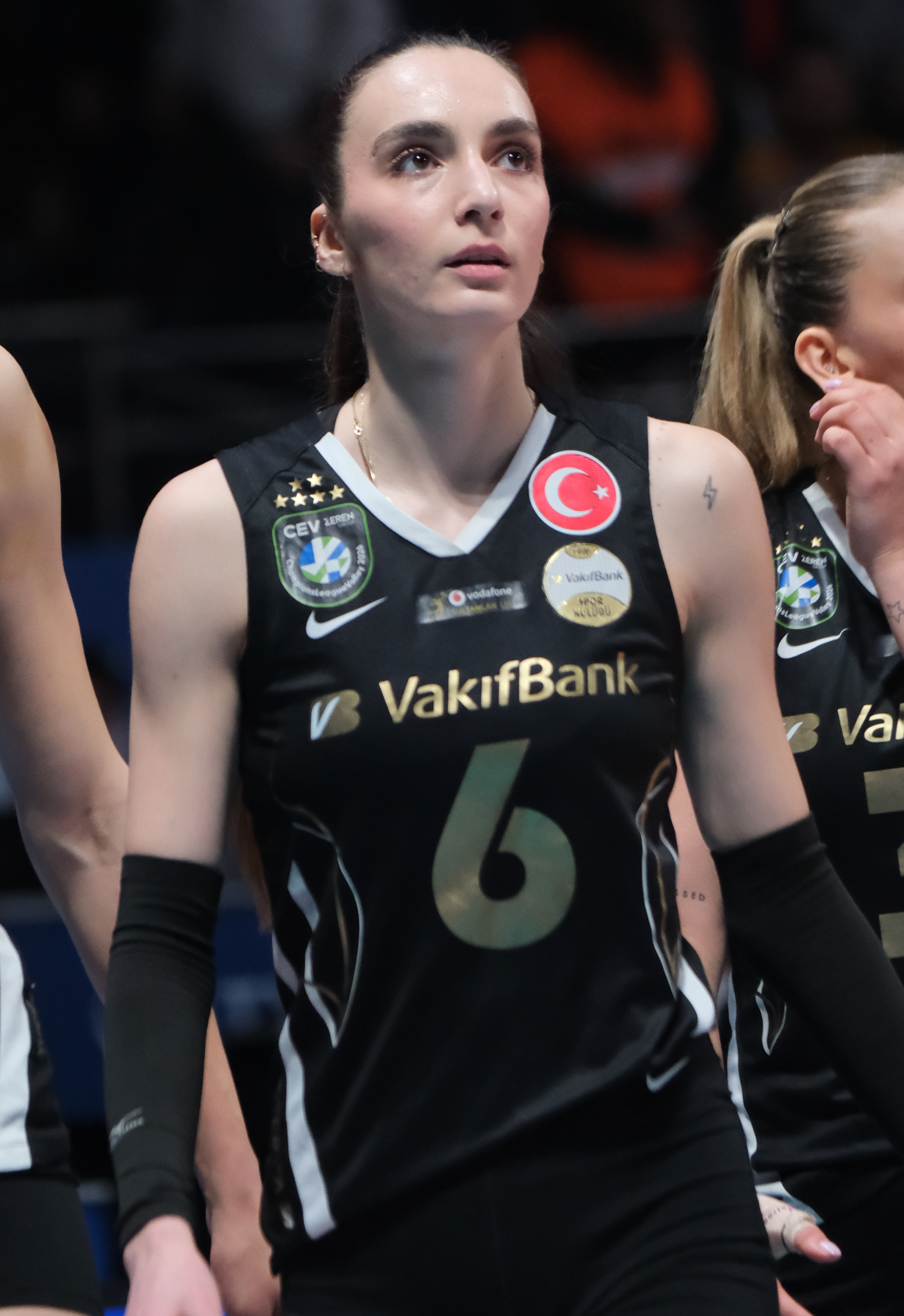

Personal information
- Born: 16 April 2004 (age 22); Turkey
- Height: 1.85 m (6 ft 1 in)

Volleyball information
- Position: Middle blocker
- Current club: (Turkey) VakıfBank Istanbul

Career
| Years | Teams |
|---|---|
| –2018 | (Turkey) Nilüfer Bld. |
| 2018–2020 | (Turkey) VakıfBank Istanbul U18 |
| 2020–2023 | (Turkey) VakıfBank Istanbul |
| 2023–2024 | (Turkey) Karayolları |
| 2024–2025 | (Turkey) → Aydın Büyükşehir Bld. |
| 2025– | (Turkey) VakıfBank Istanbul |

National team
| 2022 | Turkey U18 |
| 2025– | Turkey |
Honours
Women's volleyball
Representing Turkey
FIVB Nations League
| Gold medal – first place | 2026 Macau | Team |
Mediterranean Games
| Gold medal – first place | 2026 Taranto | Team |
Islamic Solidarity Games
| Gold medal – first place | 2025 Rıyadh | Team |

Berka Buse Özden (born 16 April 2004) is a Turkish professional volleyball player. She plays in the middle blocker position. Currently, she plays for VakıfBank Istanbul and is a member of the Turkey women's national volleyball team.

== Personal life ==
Berka Buse Özden was born on 16 April 2004.

== Club career ==
She is 1.85 m (6 ft 1 in) tall, and plays in the middle blocker position.

Özden started her career very early at Nilüfer Bld. in Bursa. In 2018, she transferred to the U18 team of VakıfBank Istanbul, where she played two years before she was promoted to the main team in the 2020–21 Turkish Women's Volleyball League season. After three years, she joined Karayolları, and played one season only. In the 2024–25 Turkish League season, she was loaned out to Aydın Büyükşehir Bld.. In 2025, it was announced that she returns to her former club Vakıfbank Istanbul.

== International career ==
She was part of the Turkey U19 team at the 2022 Women's U19 Volleyball European Championship in Skopje, North Macedonia.

With the Turkey girls' U18 team, she took part at the 2022 European Youth Summer Olympic Festival in Banská Bystrica, Slovakia, where she won the silver medal.

Özden was selected to the Turkey women's national volleyball team to play at the 2025 FIVB Women's Volleyball Nations League. She was part of the Turkey team, which became champion at the 2025 Islamic Solidarity Games in Riyadh, Saudi Arabia.

She captured gold medal at the 2026 FIVB Volleyball Nations League in Macau, China, and at the 2026 Mediterranean Games in Taranto, Italy.

== Honours ==
Turkey U18
(silver) 2022 European Youth Summer Olympic Festival

Turkey
(gold) 2025 Islamic Solidarity Games
(gold) 2026 FIVB Women's Volleyball Nations League
(gold) 2026 Mediterranean Games
