= Eylül Akarçeşme =

Turkish volleyball player (born 1999)

Eylül Akarçeşme Yatgın
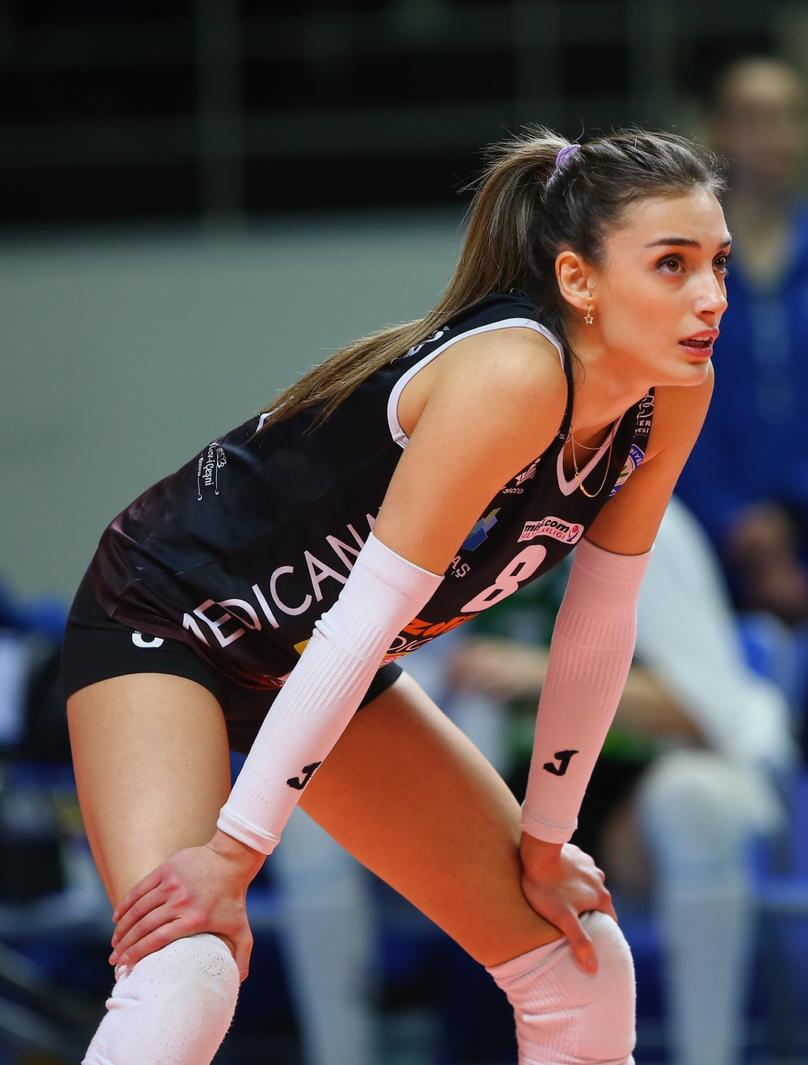
- Eylül Akarçeşme of Nilüfer Bld. (2024)

Personal information
- Full name: Eylül Akarçeşme Yatgın
- Born: Eylül Akarçeşme; 1 October 1999 (age 27); Ankara, Turkey
- Height: 1.70 m (5 ft 7 in)
- Weight: 53 kg (117 lb)
- Spike: 285 cm (112 in)
- Block: 270 cm (110 in)

Volleyball information
- Position: Libero
- Current club: VakıfBank

Career
Years	Teams
2016–2019	(Turkey) Halkbank Ankara
2019–2020	(Turkey) Çan Gençlik Kale
2020–2022	(Turkey) Aydın Büyükşehir Bld.
2022–2024	(Turkey) Nilüfer Nilüfer Bld.
2024–2026	(Turkey) Galatasaray
2026–	(Turkey) VakıfBank

National team
2025–	Turkey
Honours
Women's volleyball
Representing Turkey
FIVB World Championship
Silver medal – second place	2025 Thailand	Team
FIVB Nations League
Gold medal – first place	2026 Macau	Team
European Championship
Gold medal – first place	2026 Azerbaijan/Czech Republic/Sweden/Turkey	Team

Eylül Akarçeşme Yatgın (born Eylül Akarçeşme; 1 October 1999) is a Turkish professional volleyball player. She is 1.70 m (5 ft 7 in) tall at 53 kg (117 lb) and plays in the libero position. Currently, she plays for VakıfBank and is a member of the Turkey women's national volleyball team.

== Personal life ==
Eylül Akarçeşme was born in Ankara, Turkey on 1 October 1999. In 2024, she married the national volleyball player Oğulcan Yatgın (born 28 April 1997).

== Club career ==
Akarçeşme started her career in her hometown at Halkbank Ankara in the 2016–17 season. After three years, she transferred to Çan Gençlik Kale in Çanakkale for the 2019–20 season, where she was one year only.

In May 2020, she signed a contract with Aydın Büyükşehir Bld.. In May the next year, it was announced that her contract was extended for two years.

In April 2022, she moved to Bursa to join Nilüfer Bld..

On 17 May 2024, she signed a one-year contract with Galatasaray in Istanbul. She signed a new one-year contract with Galatasaray on 21 January 2025.

== International career ==
In 2025, she was admitted to the Turkey women's national volleyball team to play at the 2025 FIVB Women's Volleyball Nations League. She debuted in the league's second match against Thailand on 6 June 2025.

== Honours ==
=== Clubs ===
- 2024–25 BVA Cup Champion, with Galatasaray
- 2025–26 CEV Cup Champion, with Galatasaray

== External ==
- Eylül Yatgın at FIVB.com
- Eylül Yatgın at the European Volleyball Confederation
- Eylül Yatgın at Volleybox
- Eylül Yatgın at InterSportStats
