= Deniz Uyanık =

Turkish volleyball player (born 2001)

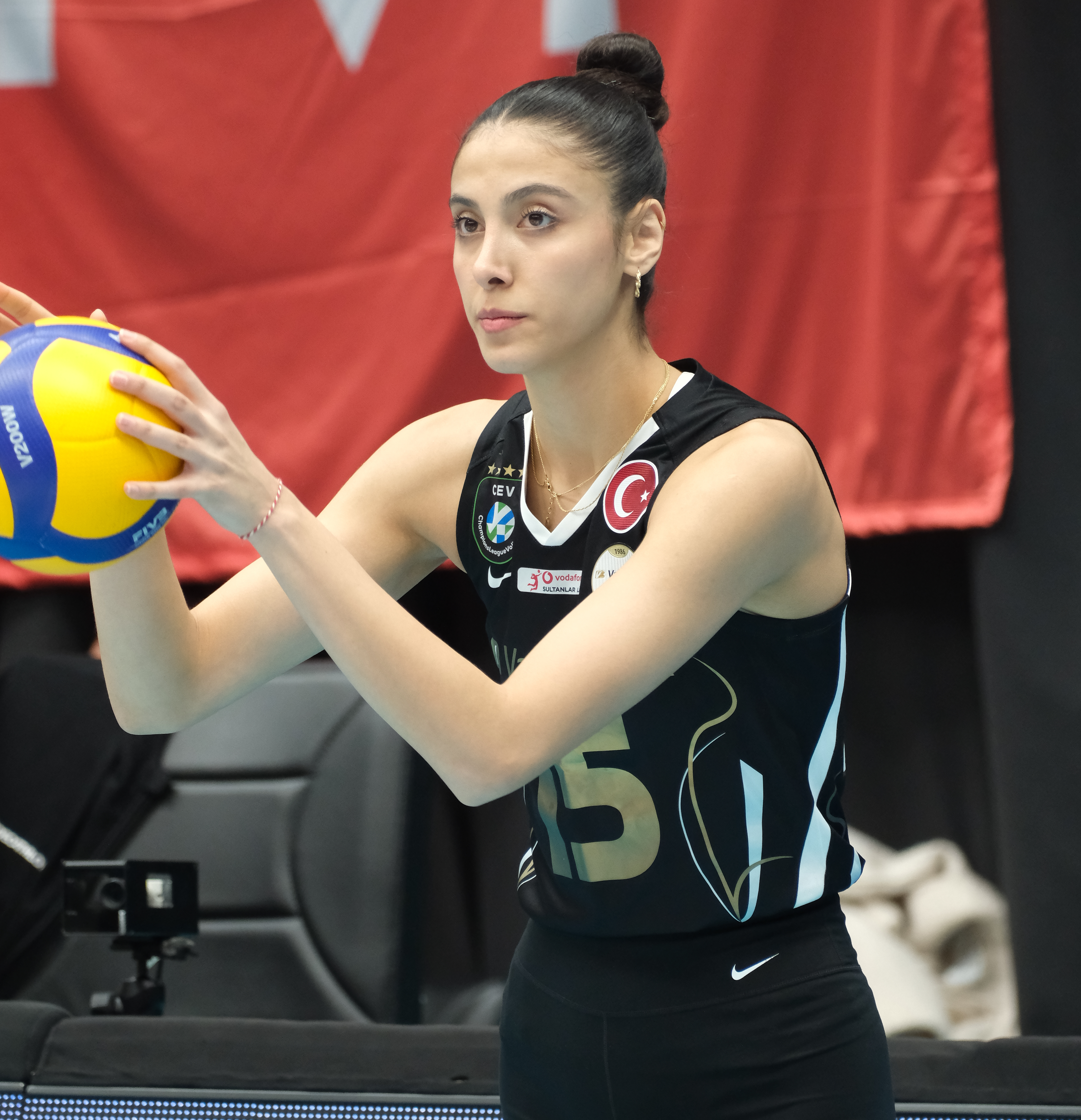
- Deniz Uyanık of Vakıfbank Istanbul (2025)

Personal information
- Born: 25 June 2001 (age 25); Turkey
- Height: 1.95 m (6 ft 5 in)
- Block: 310 cm (120 in)

Volleyball information
- Position: Middle Blocker
- Current club: (Turkey) Vakıfbank Istanbul
- Number: 15

Career
Years	Teams
2018–2021	(Turkey) Beylikdüzü
2021–2022	(Turkey) Edremit Bld. Altınoluk
2022–2024	(Turkey) Nilüfer Bld.
2024–	(Turkey) Vakıfbank Istanbul

National team
2025–	Turkey
Honours
Women's volleyball
Representing Turkey
FIVB Nations League
Gold medal – first place	2026 Macau	Team
European Championship
Gold medal – first place	2026 Azerbaijan/Czech Republic/Sweden/Turkey	Team
Islamic Solidarity Games
Gold medal – first place	2025 Rıyadh	Team

Deniz Uyanık (born 25 June 2001) is a Turkish professional volleyball player. She plays in the middle blocker position. Currently, she plays for Vakıfbank Istanbul and is a member of the Turkey women's national volleyball team.

== Personal life ==
Deniz Uyanık was born on 25 June 2001.

== Club career ==
She is 1.95 m (6 ft 5 in) tall, and plays in the middle blocker position.

Uyanık started her career at Beylikdüzü SC in Istanbul, and played from 2018 to 2021. She then transferred to Edremit Bld. Altınoluk., where she played in the 2021–22 season. After two seasons with Nilüfer Bld. in Bursa, she joined Vakıfbank Istanbul in the 2024–25Turkish League season. She won with her team the champions title. At the 2024–25 CEV Women's Champions League Final Four, her team lost the third-place match to Italian Numia Vero Volley Milano.

== International career ==
After playing in the Turkey women's junior team, she was selected to the Turkey women's national volleyball team to play at the 2025 FIVB Women's Volleyball Nations League. She debuted in the match against France on 3 June 2025, and became top scorer of her team with 16 points.

She was the captain of the national team, which became champion at the 2025 Islamic Solidarity Games in Riyadh, Saudi Arabia.

== Honours ==
=== Club ===
Turkish Women's Volleyball League
(gold) 2024–25 (Vakıfbank Istanbul)

=== Intetnational ===
Turkey
(gold) 2025 Islamic Solidarity Games
