= Maki Yamaguchi =

Japanese volleyball player

Personal information
- Nationality: Japanese
- Born: 13 March 1999 (age 27) Yokohama, Kanagawa, Japan
- Height: 175 cm (5 ft 9 in)

Volleyball information
- Position: Middle blocker
- Current club: KUROBE Aqua Fairies

Career
- Years: Team
- 2021–2022: Route Inn Hotels Brilliant Aries
- 2022–: KUROBE Aqua Fairies

National team
- Years: Team
- 2025–: Japan
Honours
Women's volleyball
Representing Japan
Asian Games
Silver medal – second place	2026 Aichi–Nagoya	Team

Maki Yamaguchi (Japanese: 山口 真季, born 13 March 1999) is a Japanese professional volleyball player who plays as a middle blocker for KUROBE Aqua Fairies in Japan's SV.League and the Japan women's national volleyball team. She previously played for Route Inn Hotels Brilliant Aries and attended Kokushikan University. She was part of the Japanese team that won the silver medal in women's volleyball at the 2026 Asian Games.

== Early life and education ==
Yamaguchi was born in Yokohama, Kanagawa Prefecture, Japan. She began playing volleyball in the third grade of elementary school after a friend invited her to join a team. Her mother also played volleyball recreationally. Yamaguchi attended Yamato Minami High School before enrolling at Kokushikan University, where she continued playing volleyball.

== Club career ==
=== Route Inn Hotels Brilliant Aries ===
Yamaguchi joined Route Inn Hotels Brilliant Aries as a designated player during the 2020–21 season while completing her university studies. She competed in the V.League Division 2 women's competition and continued with the club after graduating from Kokushikan University in 2021.

=== KUROBE Aqua Fairies ===
In June 2022, Yamaguchi joined KUROBE Aqua Fairies, a club competing in Japan's top-level women's volleyball league. She made her debut in the top division during the 2022–23 season. Playing as a middle blocker, she contributed through attacking plays at the net and blocking.

Yamaguchi continued with KUROBE as the domestic competition transitioned to the SV.League. During the 2024–25 regular season, she appeared in 37 matches and scored 253 attack points, 103 block points and 11 service aces, for a total of 367 points.

In the 2025–26 SV.League regular season, Yamaguchi appeared in 43 matches and recorded 223 attack points, 136 block points and 21 service aces, finishing with 380 points. Her 136 block points accounted for a substantial part of her season total.

In a February 2025 interview with Sportiva, Yamaguchi discussed her approach to blocking and described the satisfaction she gained from stopping attacks by taller opponents. She also discussed how watching the volleyball-themed manga and anime series Haikyu!! had influenced her interest in blocking techniques.

== International career ==
Yamaguchi was selected for Japan's registered women's national-team roster in April 2025. In 2026, she competed for Japan in international tournaments, including the 2026 FIVB Volleyball Women's Nations League and the 2026 Asian Women's Volleyball Championship. She played as a middle blocker and contributed through attacks and blocks.

Yamaguchi represented Japan in the women's volleyball tournament at the 2026 Asian Games in Aichi–Nagoya, Japan. She was listed as a middle blocker in Japan's official squad. Japan advanced to the final and won the silver medal after finishing runner-up to China.
