= Julia Szczurowska =

Polish volleyball player (born 2001)

Personal information
- Born: 29 July 2001 (age 25) Olsztyn, Poland
- Height: 190 cm (6 ft 3 in)
- Weight: 72 kg (159 lb)
- Spike: 315 cm (124 in)
- Block: 291 cm (115 in)

Volleyball information
- Position: Opposite hitter
- Current club: Kuzeyboru
- Number: 1

Career
- Years: Team
- 2015–2016l; 2015–2018; 2016–2017; 2017–2018; 2017–2018; 2018–2020; 2019–2021; 2021–2022; 2022–2024; 2023–2024; 2024–2025; 2024–2026; 2026–: Impel Wrocław U23; Impel Wrocław U20; SMS PZPS Szczyrk; #VolleyWrocław; Impel Wrocław U18; Cannes; Energa MKS Kalisz; Grot Budowlani Łódź; KGHM #VolleyWrocław; Béziers Volley; Nilüfer Bld.; Beşiktaş; Kuzeyboru
Honours
Women's volleyball
Representing Poland

Julia Szczurowska (born 29 July 2001) is a Polish professional volleyball player. She plays in the opposite hitter position for Kuzeyboru in the Turkish Women's Volleyball League. She is a member of the Poland women's national volleyball team.

== Club career ==
=== Early years ===
Szczurowska started volleyball playing career inspired by her professional volleyball player father while watching him in club matches. She started to play in the Wrocław-based club MKS MOS Wieliczka. She then joined Impel Wrocław playing in its all age groups. At the age of sixteen, she was signed as the firsit player of the senior women's team of her club, which was formed in 2017 to play in the topflight Polish Women's Volleyball League. Still a junior, she competed in the final tournaments of the Polish Championships with older teammates, and won the silver medal. With the cadets and junior teammates, she took the bronze medal. She was named the "Best Attacker" in both tournaments. Three match weeks after she debuted in th Polish Women's Volleyball League, she was named the youngest MVP.

=== France ===
Following a successful season at home, she moved to France and transferred to RC Cannes in the 2018-19 season, which her team finished the local league as champion. Due to an injury, she had to terminate her two-year contract, and returned home.

=== Poland ===
While still a junior, became the national champion in her age group with Energa MKS Kalisz. The season, she spent at Grot Budowlani Łódź. She scored a total of 158 points, including 134 on offense, 10 on serves, and 14 on blocks. During the quarterfinals of the Polish Women's Volleyball Cup, she sustained a knee injury, which limited her role on the team. After rehabilitation, she returned to Lower Silesia, and rejoined her initial club, then named #VolleyWrocław. She scored 347 points in 19 matches. As the team could not advance to the quarterfinals of the league, she requested an early termination of her contract, which was approved.

=== France ===
In 2023, she went to France again, and signed a deal with Béziers Volley to replace an injured player. While her team was on track to play in the play-offs, she terminated her contract before the end of the season.

=== Turkey ===
In April 2024, she moved to Turkey and joined the Bursa-based club Nilüfer Bld. to play in th next season of the highest-level Turkish Women's Volleyball League. End January 2024, she transferred to Beşiktaş from Istanbul signing a one and half-year contract to play in the remaining part of the season and the next season. In May 2026, she joined Kuzeyboru in Aksaray to play in the 2026–27 Turkish Women's Volleyball League.

== International career ==
Szczurowska played for the national women's U18 team at the 2017 FIVB Volleyball Girls' U18 World Championship in Argentina.

As part of the national women's U21 team, she won the bronze medal at the 2022 Women's U19 Volleyball European Championship in Skopje, North Macedonia.

She was called up to the national women's team for participation at the 2025 FIVB Women's Volleyball Nations League. In May 2026, she debuted in the national team's starting lineup in a match against Turkey at the AIA Aequilibrium Cup Women Elite. she played as the 2026 FIVB Women's Volleyball Nations League.

== Personal life ==
Julia Szczurowska was born in Olsztyn, Poland on 29 July 2001. Her father, Wojciech Szczurowski, was a former volleyball player.

== Honours ==
=== Individual ===
Best Opposite Hitter' (3)

Polish Women's U18 Championship 2015–16,
Polish Women's U20 Championship 2015–16,
Memoriał Michała Cichego 2023–24,
