= Anna Smrek =

Canadian volleyball player

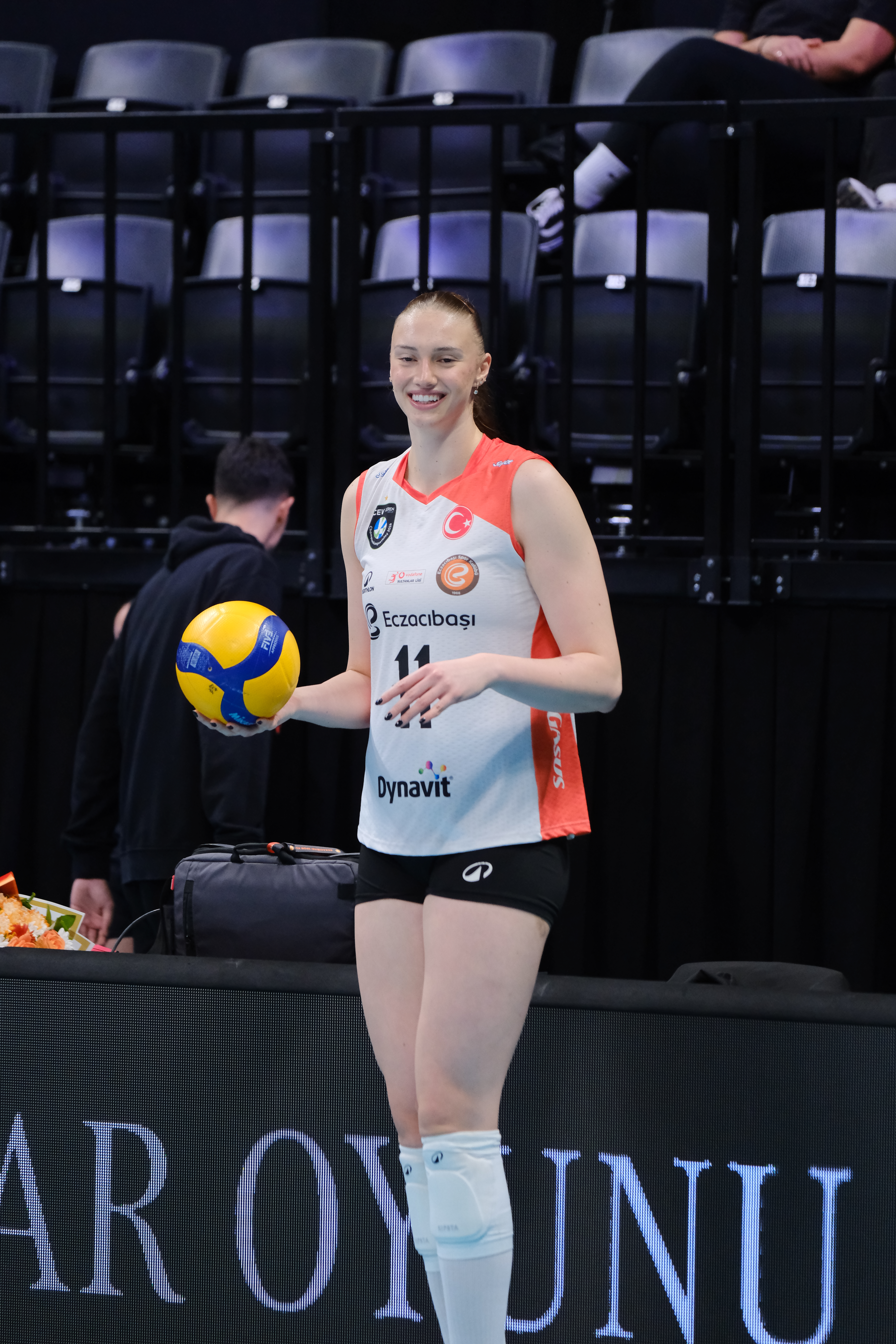
- Smrek in 2026

Personal information
- Born: October 11, 2003 (age 23); Welland, Ontario, Canada
- Height: 205 cm (6 ft 9 in)
- Education: Wisconsin

Volleyball information
- Position: Opposite
- Current club: (China) Beijing BAIC Motor
- Number: 11

Career
Years	Teams
2020–2024	(United States) Wisconsin
2025–2025	(Italy) Vero Volley Milano
2025	(Turkey) Aras Kargo Spor Kulübü
2025–2026	(Turkey) Eczacıbaşı Dynavit
2026–present	(China) Beijing BAIC Motor

National team
2025–present	Canada

Anna Smrek (born October 11, 2003) is a Canadian professional volleyball player for Beijing Arctic Ocean in the Chinese Women's Volleyball League.

== Early life ==
Smrek is a native of Welland, Ontario and attended Notre Dame College School. She played volleyball for the Canadian Youth National team from 2018 to 2020.

== College career ==
Smrek was heavily recruited in high school and committed to the Wisconsin Badgers while in the 10th grade. She joined the team in 2020. In 2021, she was a pivotal member of the team which won the national championship and was named the tournament's Most Outstanding Player. In 2023, she was named an AVCA Second-Team All-American.

== International career ==
=== Club ===
Following her time at Wisconsin, Smrek was drafted by the Orlando Valkyries of the Pro Volleyball Federation. However, Smrek decided to pursue overseas opportunities and signed with Vero Volley Milano in Italy in January 2025. She then signed with the Turkish club Aras Kargo Spor Kulübü in August 2025. In December 2025, she signed with the prominent Turkish club, Eczacıbaşı Dynavit. In June 2026, Smrek reportedly transferred to Beijing Arctic Ocean.

=== National team ===
Smrek represented Canada in the 2025 FIVB Women's Volleyball Nations League.

== Personal life ==
Her father, Mike Smrek, is a former NBA player who won two championships with the Los Angeles Lakers.
