= Jazmine White =

Canadian volleyball player (born 1993)

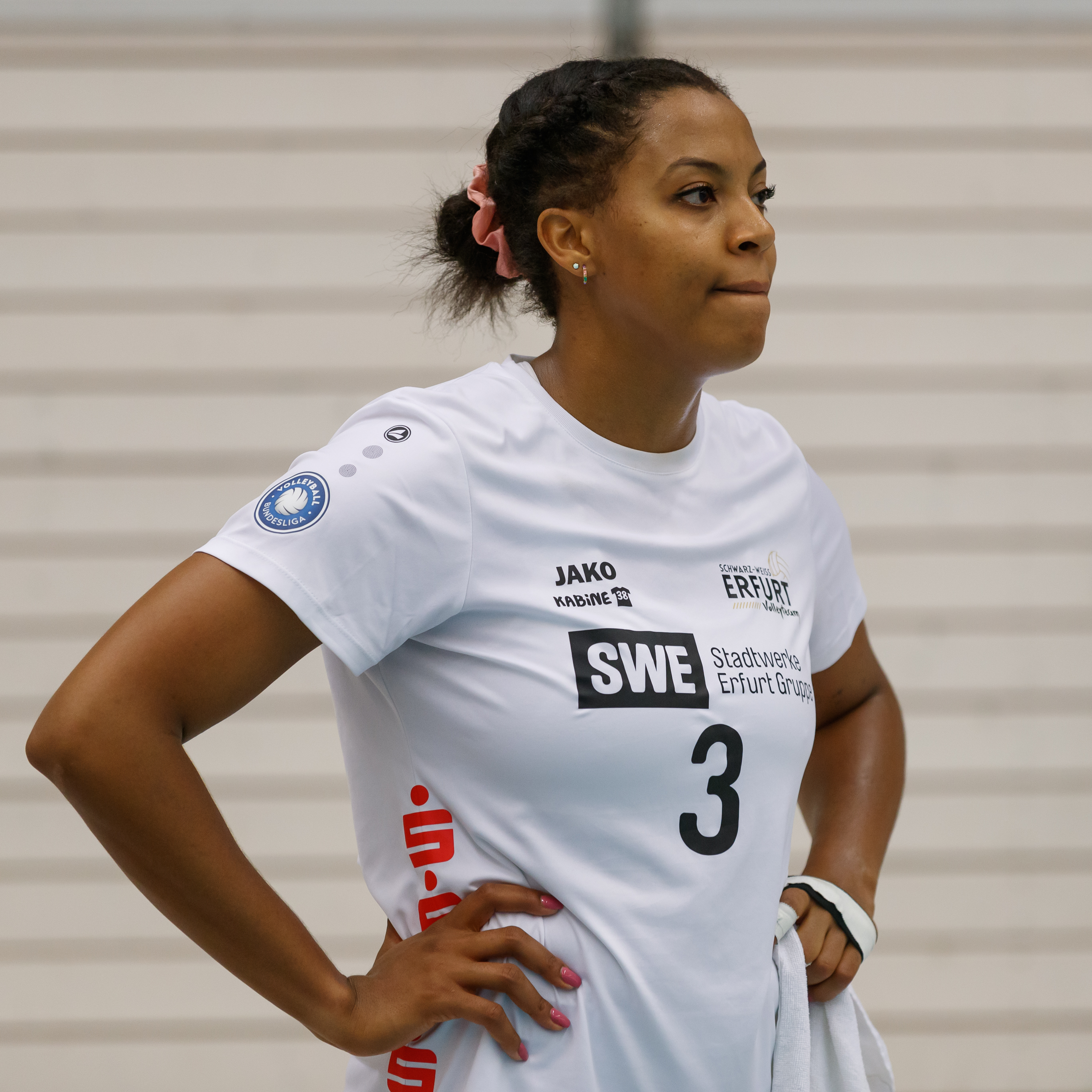

Personal information
- Nationality: Canadian
- Born: December 14, 1993 (age 32) Oshawa, Ontario, Canada
- Education: Michigan State Spartans
- Height: 6 ft 2 in (1.87 m)

Volleyball information
- Position: Middle blocker
- Current club: (United States) LOVB Houston
- Number: 6 (LOVB Houston)

Career
- Years: Team
- 2015–2017: Woman
- 2017–2018: Sm'Aesch Pfeffingen
- 2018–2019: Nyíregyháza
- 2019–2020: Sm'Aesch Pfeffingen
- 2020–2021: Vilsbiburg
- 2021–2022: Erfurt
- 2022–2024: Schweriner
- 2024–2025: Levallois Paris
- 2026–: LOVB Houston

National team
- Years: Team
- 2019–: Canada
Medal record
NORCECA Championship
Gold medal – first place	2026 Santo Domingo
Bronze medal – third place	2021 Guadalajara
Bronze medal – third place	2023 Quebec City

Jazmine White (born December 14, 1993) is a Canadian volleyball player who plays as a middle blocker for LOVB Houston and the Canada national team.

== Youth and college career ==
White grown up in Canadian high school tournaments with R. S. McLaughlin, after which she then moved to the United States to participate in the NCAA Division I event, where from 2011 to 2014, she played with Michigan State.

== Club career ==
In the 2015–16 season, White began her professional career in Finland, taking part in the Finnish Women's Volleyball League with Woman, where she played for two years. In the 2017–18 championship, she played in the Swiss Women's Volleyball League with Sm'Aesch Pfeffingen, while in the following season, she played for Nemzeti Bajnokság I with Fatum Nyíregyháza, winning the Hungarian Cup. Then in the 2019–20 season, she was once again a member of Sm'Aesch Pfeffingen.

White arrived in the German Women's Volleyball League in the 2020–21 season, playing for Vilsbiburg, remaining in the league in the following season with Erfurt, while in the 2022–23 season, she moved to Schweriner, where she spent two years and won a German Cup. In the 2024–25 season, she played in the French Ligue A with Levallois Paris, winning the national title, and later participated in LOVB Pro 2026 with LOVB Houston.

== International career ==
In 2019, White made her debut for the Canada national team during the XVIII Pan American Games, going on to win the bronze medal at the NORCECA Champions Cup of the same year. She then won another bronze at the 2021 NORCECA Championship, which she repeated in the 2023 edition. She then won the gold medal 2026 edition.

== Honours ==
=== Clubs ===
- 2024–25 French Championship – Champion, with Levallois Paris
- 2022–23 German Cup – Champion, with Schweriner
- 2018–2019 Hungarian Cup - Champions, with Nyíregyháza

=== National team ===
- 2026 2026 NORCECA Championship
- 2019 NORCECA Champions Cup
- 2021 2021 NORCECA Championship
- 2023 2023 NORCECA Championship
