= Miiku Iwasawa =

Japanese volleyball player (born 1999)

Personal information
- Full name: Miiku Iwasawa
- Nationality: Japanese
- Born: 13 October 1999 (age 27); Machida City, Tokyo, Japan
- Height: 1.62 m (5 ft 4 in)
- Weight: 58 kg (128 lb)
- Spike: 270 cm (106 in)
- Block: 265 cm (104 in)

Volleyball information
- Position: Libero
- Current club: (Japan) Saitama Ageo Medics
- Number: 19 (national); 12 (club)

Career
Years	Teams
2015–2018; 2018–present	(Japan) Shimokitazawa Seitoku High School (Japan) Saitama Ageo Medics

National team
2017–	Japan
Honours
Women's volleyball
Representing Japan
Asian Championship
Bronze medal – third place	2023 Nakhon Ratchasima	Team
U20 World Championship
Bronze medal – third place	2017 Mexico	Team

Miiku Iwasawa (岩澤 実育, Iwasawa Miiku; born 13 October 1999) is a Japanese professional volleyball player. She plays in the SV.League for Saitama Ageo Medics.

== Career ==
=== Early Years ===
In her second and final year of high school, she won the All Japan High School Championship.

In 2017, Iwasawa was selected to represent Japan at FIVB Volleyball Women's U21 World Championship in Mexico where the team finished with Bronze medal.

=== Professional Years ===
In March 2018, Saitama Ageo Medics announced that she would join the team. As Akane Yamagishi was the regular libero on the team, she was unable to secure a regular starting position and mainly came on as a subtitute receiver.

In the 2022-23 season, she made her starting member debut in the V.League Division 1 opening match against NEC Red Rockets. The team won the match in straight-sets victory. She also played as the starting libero in the second match against NEC, making a series of excellent receives and contributing to the team's winning streak. She also received the VOM (V.League of the Match) award.

In 2023, she was selected as a member of Japan women's national volleyball team for the first time.

In 2025, she was selected for the VNL first week's round in Canada. She was registered as an outside hitter rather than libero because she was a substitute receiver. On June 8 the same year, she made her national team debut as a libero in the match against the Dominican Republic in the same round. She supported the team with tenacious defense and contributed to the team's straight-sets victory.

== Award ==
=== Individual ===
- 2017 U20 World Championship - Best Digger

=== High School Team ===
- 2015-16 All Japan High School Championship - - Champion, with Shimokitazawa Seitoku High School
- 2016-17 All Japan High School Championship - - Champion, with Shimokitazawa Seitoku High School
- 2017-18 All Japan High School Championship - - Bronze Medal, with Shimokitazawa Seitoku High School

=== Club Team ===
- 2019-20 V.League Division 1 Women's - - Bronze Medal, with Saitama Ageo Medics
- 2022-23 Kurowashiki All Japan Volleyball Tournament - - Runner-up, with Saitama Ageo Medics
- 2023-24 V.League Division 1 Women's - - Bronze Medal, with Saitama Ageo Medics
- 2025-26 Empress' Cup All Japan Volleyball Championship - - Bronze Medal, with Saitama Ageo Medics

=== National Team ===
- (Mexico) 2017 FIVB Volleyball Women's U20 World Championship - - Bronze Medal
- (Thailand) 2023 Asian Women's Volleyball Championship - - Bronze Medal
