= Martyna Czyrniańska =

Polish volleyball player

Personal information
- Born: 13 October 2003 (age 23) Krynica-Zdrój
- Height: 191 cm (6 ft 3 in)

Volleyball information
- Position: Outside hitter
- Current club: Kuzeyboru
- Number: 15

Career
- Years: Team
- 2020–2023: Chemik Police
- 2023–2024: Eczacibasi
- 2024-2025: Bahçelievler Belediyespor
- 2025–: Kuzeyboru
Honours
Women's volleyball
Representing Poland
FIVB Nations League
Bronze medal – third place	2023 Arlington	Team
Bronze medal – third place	2024 Bangkok	Team
Bronze medal – third place	2025 Łódź	Team

Martyna Czyrniańska (born 13 October 2003 in Krynica-Zdrój) is a Polish volleyball player who plays as an outside hitter. She is a member of the Poland women's national volleyball team.

== Career ==
Czyrniańska began her career at UKS Dwójka Krynica, where her first coach was Krzysztof Poprawa. In 2017, she joined the Polish Volleyball Federation's School of Sports Mastery in Szczyrk. She played for the junior teams of Elite Volley Kraków until 2019 and Energa MKS SMS Kalisz from 2019. In 2020, she won the Polish Junior Championships and the Polish Cadet Championships with Kalisz. She also competed in the I Liga with SMS PZPS Szczyrk during the 2019/2020 and 2020/2021 seasons.

From June 2021 to the end of the 2022/23 season she played for Chemik Police, winning the Polish Championship in the 2021/2022 season. In 2022, she was named Discovery of the 2021/2022 Tauron League season during the 20th Anniversary Gala of the Polish Volleyball League. For the 2023/2024 season, she joined Eczacıbaşı Dynavit. Starting in the 2024/2025 season, she will play for Bahçelievler Belediyespor.

In April 2021 Czyrniańska was called up to the senior Polish national team, making her debut on 29 April 2021 in a friendly match against the Czech Republic. That year, she participated in the Nations League, where Poland finished 11th. She made her Nations League debut on 7 June 2021 in a match against the Netherlands. She also competed in the Junior World Championships, where the team finished 6th, and in the European Championships where Poland finished 5th.

Her older brother Patryk also plays professional volleyball, as does her sister-in-law Adrianna Rybak-Czyrniańska.

== Club achievements ==
=== Junior ===
Polish Cadet Championships:

- 2020

Polish Junior Championships:

- 2020

=== Senior ===
Polish League:

- 2022

Polish Cup:

- 2023

Club World Championships:

- 2023

Turkish League:

- 2024

== National team achievements ==
Nations League:

- 2023, 2024

== Individual awards ==
- 2020: Best Attacker of the Polish Cadet Championships
- 2020: MVP of the final match of the Polish Junior Championships
