= Diana Duarte =

Brazilian volleyball player

Personal information
- Full name: Diana Duarte Alecrim
- Nationality: Brazilian
- Born: 22 February 1999 (age 27)
- Height: 194 cm (6 ft 4 in)
- Spike: 310 cm (122 in)
- Block: 306 cm (120 in)

Volleyball information
- Position: Middle Blocker
- Current club: Sesi Volei Bauru
- Number: 2

Career
Years	Teams
2019-2023	Barueri
2023–2025	THY S.K
2025-	Sesi Volei Bauru
Honours
Women's volleyball
Representing Brazil
Olympic Games
Bronze medal – third place	2024 Paris	Team
FIVB World Championship
Bronze medal – third place	2025 Thailand	Team
FIVB Nations League
Silver medal – second place	2025 Łódź
Silver medal – second place	2026 Macau
South American Championship
Gold medal – first place	2023 Recife
Gold medal – first place	2026 Rio de Janeiro

Diana Duarte Alecrim (born 22 February 1999) is a Brazilian volleyball player. She represented Brazil at the 2024 Summer Olympics winning a bronze medal .
