= Kanokporn Sangthong =

Thai volleyball player (born 2005)

Personal information
- Full name: Kanokporn Sangthong
- Nickname: Noei
- Born: March 28, 2005 (age 21)
- Height: 170 cm (5 ft 7 in)
- Weight: 65 kg (143 lb)
- Spike: 280 cm (110 in)
- Block: 275 cm (108 in)

Volleyball information
- Position: Setter
- Current club: (Thailand) Supreme Chonburi
- Number: 13, 9

National team
2024	Thailand

Kanokporn Sangthong (Thai: กนกพร แสงทอง; born March 28, 2005) is a Thai volleyball player who plays for Supereme Chonburi. She made her debut at VNL in 2024.

== Career ==
She played for Thailand's U19 Women's Volleyball Team in 2023 FIVB Volleyball Girls' U19 World Championship and finished at 6th place.

After Pornpun Guedpard injured at FIVB Women's Volleyball Nations League in 2024, Kanokporn was called in for replacement as a setter.

== Clubs ==
- (Thailand) Supreme Chonburi (2023-)
