= 2026 FIVB Women's Volleyball Nations League =

世界女排聯賽澳門2026 (Chinese); Shìjiè Nǔpái Liánsài Àomén 2026

Tournament details
- Host country: China
- City: Macau (final round)
- Dates: 3 June – 26 July
- Teams: 18 (from 4 confederations)
- Venue: 10 (in 10 host cities)

Final positions
- Champions: Turkey (2nd title)
- Runners-up: Brazil
- Third place: Italy
- Fourth place: China
- Relegated: Bulgaria

Tournament awards
- MVP: (Turkey) Melissa Vargas
- Best Scorer: (Canada) Kiera Van Ryk
- Best Attacker: (Canada) Kiera Van Ryk
- Best Blocker: (Brazil) Júlia Kudiess
- Best Server: (Italy) Ekaterina Antropova
- Best Setter: (Ukraine) Daria Sharhorodska
- Best Digger: (France) Juliette Gelin
- Best Receiver: (Serbia) Bojana Gočanin

Tournament statistics
- Matches played: 116
- Attendance: 428,221 (3,692 per match)

The 2026 FIVB Women's Volleyball Nations League was the eighth edition of the FIVB Women's Volleyball Nations League, an annual women's international volleyball tournament. It was held from 3 June to 26 July 2026, with the final round took place at the Macau East Asian Games Dome in Macau, China.

Following the results of the 2025 Nations League, South Korea were relegated and replaced by Ukraine as the highest-ranked non-VNL team in the FIVB World Rankings.

Turkey won their second VNL title by defeating Brazil 3–1 in the final, with Melissa Vargas earning MVP honors after scoring 33 points in the gold medal match. Brazil finished as the tournament runner-up for the fifth time, while Italy claimed the bronze medal with a 3–1 victory over hosts China in the third-place play-off.

== Host selection ==
In January 2026, the FIVB announced China as the host for the Women's Volleyball Nations League (VNL) Finals. Macau was selected to stage the event, marking the first time in 15 years—since the 2011 FIVB Volleyball World Grand Prix—that the city will host the women's finals.

== Teams ==
=== Qualification ===
The tournament features 18 national teams. Following the 2025 season, South Korea were excluded after finishing last among the teams and replaced by Ukraine, who earned the right as the highest-ranked non-VNL team in the FIVB World Rankings.

List of 2026 VNL participating teams
Country	Confederation	Previous appearances			Best performance
Country	Confederation	Total	First	Last	Best performance
Belgium	CEV	5	2018	2025	7th place (2019)
Brazil	CSV	7	2018	2025	Runners-up (2019, 2021, 2022, 2025)
Bulgaria	CEV	5	2019	2025	13th place (2023, 2025)
Canada	NORCECA	5	2021	2025	6th place (2024)
China	AVC	7	2018	2025	Runners-up (2023)
Czech Republic	CEV	1	2025		11th place (2025)
Dominican Republic	NORCECA	7	2018	2025	6th place (2021)
France	CEV	2	2024	2025	9th place (2025)
Germany	CEV	7	2018	2025	7th place (2025)
Italy	CEV	7	2018	2025	Champions (2022, 2024, 2025)
Japan	AVC	7	2018	2025	Runners-up (2024)
Netherlands	CEV	7	2018	2025	5th place (2018)
Poland	CEV	7	2018	2025	3rd place (2023, 2024, 2025)
Serbia	CEV	7	2018	2025	3rd place (2022)
Thailand	AVC	7	2018	2025	8th place (2022, 2024)
Turkey	CEV	7	2018	2025	Champions (2023)
Ukraine	CEV	0	Debut		—N/a
United States	NORCECA	7	2018	2025	Champions (2018, 2019, 2021)

=== Squads ===
Each participating national team submitted a final 30-player roster published via the VNL competition website. For each competition week of the tournament, teams select a match-day lineup consisting of 12 to 14 players from their registered 30-player squad.

== Format ==
=== Preliminary round ===
The format of play is generally the same as in the 2022 edition. Each week, six teams will compete during the pool phase. Each team plays 12 matches during the pool stage. During three weeks, each team plays four times in a table that is set up by an algorithm, with all teams playing 12 times in total at the end of the first phase. The eight best teams advance to the quarter-finals, while the last-placed team loses its place to the highest FIVB-ranked team that did not compete this year. The only country that has already qualified for this phase is China for hosting the finals and if it does not finish the first phase among the top eight, the top seven will qualify with the Chinese team being ranked 8th.

=== Final round ===
The VNL Finals will see the top eight teams moving directly to the knockout phase, which will consist of eight matches in total: four quarterfinals, two semi-finals, and the bronze and gold medal matches.

Final 8 direct elimination formula:

- The first ranked team will play a quarterfinal match against the eighth ranked team, the second ranked team will play a quarterfinal match against the seventh ranked team, the third ranked team will play a quarterfinal match against the sixth ranked team, and the fourth ranked team will play a quarterfinal match against the fifth ranked team.
- The national team of the hosting territory of the event will have a guaranteed berth for the Final round. If the host nation team do not finish in the top eight in the Preliminary round, they will replace the eighth place team and play as the eighth seed.

== Pool composition ==
The overview of pools was released on 28 January 2026.

Week 1
Pool 1 Canada	Pool 2 Brazil	Pool 3 China
Canada; United States; France; Japan; Ukraine; Germany	Brazil; Italy; Netherlands; Turkey; Dominican Republic; Bulgaria	China; Serbia; Belgium; Poland; Thailand; Czech Republic
Week 2
Pool 4 Turkey	Pool 5 Philippines	Pool 6 Thailand
Turkey; Brazil; France; Belgium; Germany; China	Japan; Italy; United States; Serbia; Dominican Republic; Czech Republic	Thailand; Ukraine; Bulgaria; Canada; Netherlands; Poland
Week 3
Pool 7 Serbia	Pool 8 Hong Kong, China	Pool 9 Japan
Serbia; Bulgaria; Czech Republic; France; Netherlands; Germany	China; Italy; Ukraine; Canada; Belgium; Dominican Republic	Japan; Brazil; Poland; Turkey; United States; Thailand

== Venues ==
=== Preliminary round ===
Week 1
Pool 1	Pool 2	Pool 3
Quebec City, Canada	Brasília, Brazil	Nanjing, China
Centre Vidéotron	Nilson Nelson Gymnasium	Nanjing Olympic Youth Sports Park Gymnasium
Capacity: 18,800	Capacity: 11,105	Capacity: 21,000
Week 2
Pool 4	Pool 5	Pool 6
Ankara, Turkey	Pasig, Philippines	Bangkok, Thailand
Ankara Arena	PhilSports Arena	Indoor Stadium Huamark
Capacity: 10,400	Capacity: 10,000	Capacity: 8,000
Week 3
Pool 7	Pool 8	Pool 9
Belgrade, Serbia	Hong Kong, China	Osaka, Japan
Belgrade Arena	Kai Tak Arena	Asue Arena Osaka
Capacity: 18,386	Capacity: 10,000	Capacity: 10,000

=== Final round ===
All matches
Macau, China
Macau East Asian Games Dome
Capacity: 9,000
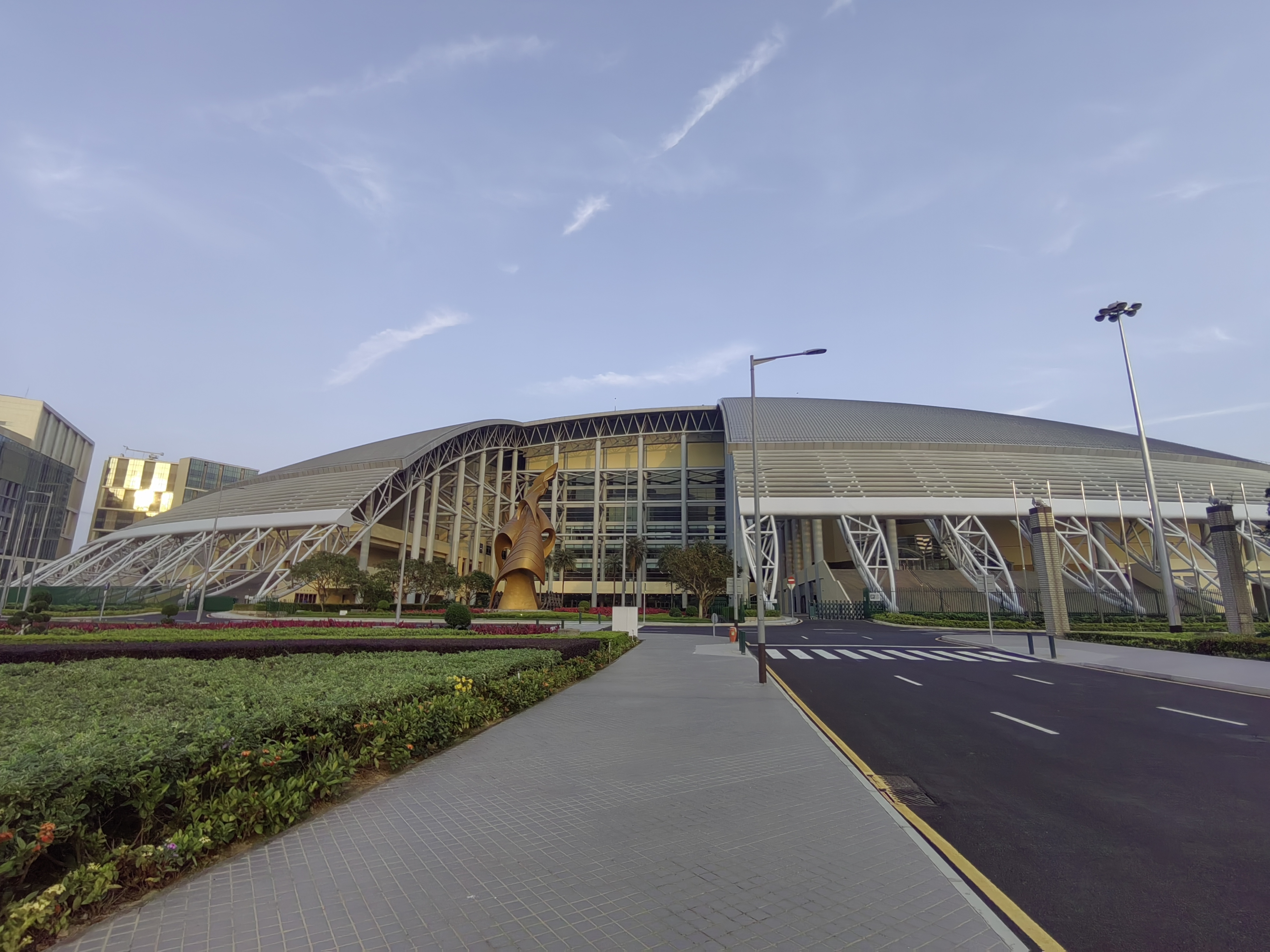

== Competition schedule ==
●	Preliminary round	●	Final round

Week 1 3–7 Jun	Week 2 17–21 Jun	Week 3 8–12 Jul	Week 4 22–26 Jul
36 matches	36 matches	36 matches	8 matches

== Pool standing procedure ==
1. Total number of victories (matches won, matches lost)
2. In the event of a tie, the following first tiebreaker will apply, with the teams ranked by the most points gained per match as follows:
  - Match won 3–0 or 3–1: 3 points for the winner, 0 points for the loser
  - Match won 3–2: 2 points for the winner, 1 point for the loser
  - Match forfeited: 3 points for the winner, 0 points (0–25, 0–25, 0–25) for the loser
3. If teams are still tied after examining the number of victories and points gained, the FIVB will examine the results in order to break the tie in the following order:
  - Sets quotient: if two or more teams are tied on the number of points gained, they will be ranked by the quotient resulting from the division of the number of all sets won by the number of all sets lost.
  - Points quotient: if the tie persists based on the sets quotient, the teams will be ranked by the quotient resulting from the division of all points scored by the total of points lost during all sets.
  - If the tie persists based on the points quotient, the tie will be broken based on the team that won the match between the tied teams during the Round Robin Phase. When the tie in points quotient is between three or more teams, these teams will be ranked taking into consideration only the matches involving the teams in question.

== Preliminary round ==
=== Ranking ===
Pos	Team	Pld	W	L	Pts	SW	SL	SR	SPW	SPL	SPR	Qualification or relegation
1	United States	12	10	2	29	32	11	2.909	1025	862	1.189	Final round
2	Italy	12	10	2	28	32	14	2.286	1063	929	1.144	Final round
3	Brazil	12	9	3	26	29	18	1.611	1083	983	1.102	Final round
4	Turkey	12	9	3	25	30	19	1.579	1109	1036	1.070	Final round
5	Canada	12	8	4	24	30	21	1.429	1148	1140	1.007	Final round
6	Japan	12	8	4	21	27	21	1.286	1103	1047	1.053	Final round
7	Netherlands	12	7	5	21	24	15	1.600	889	859	1.035	Final round
8	Poland	12	7	5	20	28	23	1.217	1127	1084	1.040	
9	China (Note: Qualified as finals' host)	12	6	6	19	26	23	1.130	1072	1056	1.015	Final round
10	Czech Republic	12	6	6	16	19	23	0.826	914	914	1.000	
11	Serbia	12	5	7	20	26	21	1.238	1040	1009	1.031	
12	Germany	12	5	7	17	21	25	0.840	1011	1014	0.997	
13	Belgium	12	4	8	10	17	32	0.531	1000	1085	0.922	
14	Thailand	12	3	9	12	17	28	0.607	956	1018	0.939	
15	Dominican Republic	12	3	9	11	17	31	0.548	977	1094	0.893	
16	Ukraine	12	3	9	10	18	31	0.581	993	1099	0.904	
17	France	12	3	9	10	17	32	0.531	1000	1131	0.884	
18	Bulgaria	12	2	10	5	10	32	0.313	849	999	0.850	Excluded from the Nations League

Source: VNL 2026 – Women's standings

=== Week 1 ===
==== Pool 1 ====
- All times are Eastern Daylight Time (UTC−04:00).

Date	Time		Score		Set 1	Set 2	Set 3	Set 4	Set 5	Total	Attd	Report
3 Jun	11:00	Ukraine	0–3	United States	16–25	17–25	23–25			56–75	5,000	P2 Boxscore
3 Jun	16:30	France	1–3	Japan	25–23	12–25	22–25	13–25		72–98	1,826	P2 Boxscore
3 Jun	20:00	Canada	1–3	Germany	26–28	25–22	18–25	18–25		87–100	2,528	P2 Boxscore
4 Jun	16:30	Ukraine	3–2	Germany	25–21	30–28	14–25	19–25	15–13	103–112	2,165	P2 Boxscore
4 Jun	20:00	Canada	3–0	United States	25–22	25–22	30–28			80–72	3,646	P2 Boxscore
5 Jun	16:30	Ukraine	1–3	Japan	20–25	25–16	16–25	20–25		81–91	3,417	P2 Boxscore
5 Jun	20:30	France	2–3	United States	21–25	25–23	25–27	25–23	11–15	107–113	3,864	P2 Boxscore
6 Jun	16:30	Canada	3–1	France	21–25	25–20	25–19	28–26		99–90	10,483	P2 Boxscore
6 Jun	20:00	Germany	0–3	Japan	20–25	15–25	24–26			59–76	5,606	P2 Boxscore
7 Jun	11:00	Ukraine	2–3	France	25–18	25–15	20–25	19–25	10–15	99–98	3,554	P2 Boxscore
7 Jun	14:30	United States	3–0	Germany	25–22	25–15	25–12			75–49	5,269	P2 Boxscore
7 Jun	18:00	Canada	2–3	Japan	27–29	20–25	25–23	30–28	12–15	114–120	7,172	P2 Boxscore

==== Pool 2 ====
- All times are Brasília Time (UTC−03:00).

Date	Time		Score		Set 1	Set 2	Set 3	Set 4	Set 5	Total	Attd	Report
3 Jun	13:00	Dominican Republic	2–3	Turkey	25–17	20–25	16–25	25–23	11–15	97–105	791	P2 Boxscore
3 Jun	16:30	Italy	3–0	Bulgaria	25–22	25–16	27–25			77–63	2,401	P2 Boxscore
3 Jun	20:00	Brazil	3–1	Netherlands	25–17	25–15	25–27	25–23		100–82	6,896	P2 Boxscore
4 Jun	16:30	Turkey	0–3	Netherlands	23–25	17–25	18–25			58–75	2,776	P2 Boxscore
4 Jun	20:00	Brazil	3–1	Dominican Republic	23–25	25–18	25–11	25–15		98–69	8,956	P2 Boxscore
5 Jun	16:30	Dominican Republic	0–3	Bulgaria	19–25	19–25	13–25			51–75	2,121	P2 Boxscore
5 Jun	20:00	Netherlands	0–3	Italy	22–25	18–25	22–25			62–75	4,085	P2 Boxscore
6 Jun	11:00	Brazil	3–0	Bulgaria	25–23	25–17	25–13			75–53	9,139	P2 Boxscore
6 Jun	15:30	Italy	3–1	Turkey	25–16	26–28	25–19	25–15		101–78	3,200	P2 Boxscore
7 Jun	11:00	Dominican Republic	0–3	Netherlands	20–25	19–25	17–25			56–75	3,227	P2 Boxscore
7 Jun	14:30	Brazil	3–2	Italy	25–15	25–22	22–25	24–26	15–12	111–100	9,802	P2 Boxscore
7 Jun	18:00	Bulgaria	1–3	Turkey	12–25	9–25	25–22	18–25		64–97	620	P2 Boxscore

==== Pool 3 ====
- All times are China Standard Time (UTC+08:00).

Date	Time		Score		Set 1	Set 2	Set 3	Set 4	Set 5	Total	Attd	Report
3 Jun	11:30	Belgium	2–3	Poland	20–25	25–22	23–25	25–18	13–15	106–105	394	P2 Boxscore
3 Jun	15:00	Thailand	0–3	Serbia	24–26	22–25	19–25			65–76	498	P2 Boxscore
3 Jun	19:30	China	0–3	Czech Republic	20–25	20–25	24–26			64–76	2,654	P2 Boxscore
4 Jun	15:00	Czech Republic	0–3	Poland	22–25	22–25	20–25			64–75	365	P2 Boxscore
4 Jun	19:30	China	3–2	Thailand	25–14	24–26	25–19	23–25	15–7	112–91	2,456	P2 Boxscore
5 Jun	15:00	Belgium	0–3	Czech Republic	20–25	22–25	15–25			57–75	390	P2 Boxscore
5 Jun	19:30	Serbia	2–3	Poland	25–17	19–25	18–25	25–22	15–17	102–106	829	P2 Boxscore
6 Jun	15:00	Thailand	2–3	Belgium	25–20	25–22	23–25	22–25	14–16	109–108	990	P2 Boxscore
6 Jun	19:30	China	3–0	Serbia	25–21	25–21	25–21			75–63	17,816	P2 Boxscore
7 Jun	11:30	Thailand	0–3	Czech Republic	14–25	19–25	11–25			44–75	544	P2 Boxscore
7 Jun	15:00	Belgium	3–2	Serbia	25–20	25–22	21–25	20–25	15–12	106–104	957	P2 Boxscore
7 Jun	19:00	China	3–1	Poland	16–25	25–18	25–23	26–24		92–90	10,276	P2 Boxscore

=== Week 2 ===
==== Pool 4 ====
- All times are Turkish Time (UTC+03:00).

Date	Time		Score		Set 1	Set 2	Set 3	Set 4	Set 5	Total	Attd	Report
17 Jun	12:30	Germany	2–3	China	27–25	23–25	25–18	20–25	6–15	101–108	374	P2 Boxscore
17 Jun	16:00	France	0–3	Brazil	22–25	19–25	15–25			56–75	837	P2 Boxscore
17 Jun	19:30	Turkey	3–0	Belgium	25–14	25–13	25–23			75–50	9,337	P2 Boxscore
18 Jun	16:00	Belgium	2–3	Brazil	20–25	25–22	25–23	22–25	13–15	105–110	824	P2 Boxscore
18 Jun	19:30	Turkey	3–0	France	25–17	25–23	25–20			75–60	9,813	P2 Boxscore
19 Jun	16:00	France	0–3	China	18–25	17–25	19–25			54–75	854	P2 Boxscore
19 Jun	19:30	Belgium	0–3	Germany	20–25	19–25	21–25			60–75	1,598	P2 Boxscore
20 Jun	16:00	China	1–3	Brazil	24–26	18–25	25–19	15–25		82–95	1,880	P2 Boxscore
20 Jun	19:30	Turkey	3–2	Germany	18–25	24–26	25–19	25–22	15–13	107–105	9,416	P2 Boxscore
21 Jun	12:30	Belgium	3–2	France	25–17	20–25	21–25	25–18	15–8	106–93	387	P2 Boxscore
21 Jun	16:00	Germany	3–2	Brazil	26–24	28–26	15–25	19–25	16–14	104–114	1,238	P2 Boxscore
21 Jun	19:30	Turkey	3–2	China	25–21	26–28	23–25	25–16	15–12	114–102	11,254	P2 Boxscore

==== Pool 5 ====
- All times are Philippine Standard Time (UTC+08:00).

Date	Time		Score		Set 1	Set 2	Set 3	Set 4	Set 5	Total	Attd	Report
17 Jun	12:00	Dominican Republic	0–3	United States	20–25	19–25	12–25			51–75	625	P2 Boxscore
17 Jun	16:00	Czech Republic	0–3	Italy	18–25	21–25	22–25			61–75	1,285	P2 Boxscore
17 Jun	20:00	Japan	3–2	Serbia	20–25	26–24	18–25	32–30	15–7	111–111	1,732	P2 Boxscore
18 Jun	16:00	Czech Republic	0–3	United States	17–25	12–25	16–25			45–75	340	P2 Boxscore
18 Jun	20:00	Serbia	2–3	Italy	14–25	15–25	25–18	25–21	12–15	91–104	1,167	P2 Boxscore
19 Jun	16:00	Dominican Republic	0–3	Serbia	19–25	23–25	18–25			60–75	733	P2 Boxscore
19 Jun	20:00	Japan	3–0	Czech Republic	25–15	25–23	27–25			77–63	1,659	P2 Boxscore
20 Jun	16:00	United States	3–0	Italy	27–25	25–20	25–16			77–61	2,572	P2 Boxscore
20 Jun	20:00	Japan	1–3	Dominican Republic	25–17	20–25	26–28	23–25		94–95	3,180	P2 Boxscore
21 Jun	12:00	Serbia	1–3	United States	22–25	25–18	16–25	20–25		83–93	1,423	P2 Boxscore
21 Jun	16:00	Czech Republic	3–2	Dominican Republic	17–25	24–26	25–18	31–29	15–10	112–108	3,305	P2 Boxscore
21 Jun	20:00	Japan	0–3	Italy	21–25	23–25	18–25			62–75	4,774	P2 Boxscore

==== Pool 6 ====
- All times are Thailand Standard Time (UTC+07:00).

Date	Time		Score		Set 1	Set 2	Set 3	Set 4	Set 5	Total	Attd	Report
17 Jun	13:00	Canada	3–1	Netherlands	20–25	25–19	25–17	25–20		95–81	887	P2 Boxscore
17 Jun	17:00	Bulgaria	0–3	Poland	12–25	22–25	23–25			57–75	1,860	P2 Boxscore
17 Jun	20:30	Thailand	2–3	Ukraine	23–25	25–19	26–28	25–22	10–15	109–109	5,248	P2 Boxscore
18 Jun	17:00	Ukraine	1–3	Poland	21–25	13–25	25–22	23–25		82–97	1,366	P2 Boxscore
18 Jun	20:30	Thailand	3–0	Bulgaria	25–22	25–20	25–17			75–59	5,248	P2 Boxscore
19 Jun	17:00	Ukraine	0–3	Netherlands	22–25	17–25	20–25			59–75	502	P2 Boxscore
19 Jun	20:30	Bulgaria	1–3	Canada	17–25	25–23	23–25	26–28		91–101	791	P2 Boxscore
20 Jun	17:00	Netherlands	1–3	Poland	17–25	17–25	25–14	23–25		82–89	4,859	P2 Boxscore
20 Jun	20:30	Thailand	3–1	Canada	25–21	22–25	25–18	25–20		97–84	5,574	P2 Boxscore
21 Jun	13:00	Bulgaria	3–2	Ukraine	25–22	19–25	21–25	25–15	17–15	107–102	867	P2 Boxscore
21 Jun	17:00	Canada	3–2	Poland	25–23	21–25	25–16	11–25	15–13	97–102	5,184	P2 Boxscore
21 Jun	20:30	Thailand	0–3	Netherlands	23–25	22–25	15–25			60–75	5,856	P2 Boxscore

=== Week 3 ===
==== Pool 7 ====
- All times are Central European Summer Time (UTC+02:00).

Date	Time		Score		Set 1	Set 2	Set 3	Set 4	Set 5	Total	Attd	Report
8 Jul	13:00	France	0–3	Netherlands	22–25	18–25	23–25			63–75	185	P2 Boxscore
8 Jul	16:30	Czech Republic	1–3	Germany	25–22	15–25	22–25	17–25		79–97	390	P2 Boxscore
8 Jul	20:00	Serbia	3–0	Bulgaria	25–16	25–19	27–25			77–60	3,450	P2 Boxscore
9 Jul	16:30	Czech Republic	0–3	Netherlands	21–25	21–25	18–25			60–75	485	P2 Boxscore
9 Jul	20:00	Serbia	2–3	France	25–20	25–22	22–25	23–25	13–15	108–107	4,150	P2 Boxscore
10 Jul	16:30	Bulgaria	1–3	Czech Republic	25–16	12–25	19–25	14–25		70–91	185	P2 Boxscore
10 Jul	20:00	Germany	0–3	Netherlands	23–25	23–25	23–25			69–75	229	P2 Boxscore
11 Jul	16:30	Bulgaria	1–3	France	25–23	20–25	28–30	22–25		95–103	485	P2 Boxscore
11 Jul	20:00	Serbia	3–0	Germany	25–20	25–22	25–23			75–65	4,650	P2 Boxscore
12 Jul	13:00	France	2–3	Czech Republic	12–25	25–21	25–22	17–25	18–20	97–113	260	P2 Boxscore
12 Jul	16:30	Bulgaria	0–3	Germany	20–25	20–25	15–25			55–75	512	P2 Boxscore
12 Jul	20:00	Serbia	3–0	Netherlands	25–23	25–19	25–15			75–57	5,035	P2 Boxscore

==== Pool 8 ====
- All times are Hong Kong Time (UTC+08:00).

Date	Time		Score		Set 1	Set 2	Set 3	Set 4	Set 5	Total	Attd	Report
8 Jul	11:30	Belgium	3–2	Dominican Republic	25–19	25–20	14–25	24–26	15–12	103–102	1,550	P2 Boxscore
8 Jul	17:00	Ukraine	1–3	Italy	15–25	25–23	10–25	21–25		71–98	4,986	P2 Boxscore
8 Jul	20:30	China	2–3	Canada	25–19	17–25	22–25	25–23	11–15	100–107	8,966	P2 Boxscore
9 Jul	17:00	Belgium	1–3	Canada	25–10	21–25	17–25	25–27		88–87	3,667	P2 Boxscore
9 Jul	20:30	China	3–0	Ukraine	25–18	25–22	25–20			75–60	6,883	P2 Boxscore
10 Jul	17:00	Ukraine	2–3	Dominican Republic	17–25	16–25	25–22	25–19	13–15	96–106	2,876	P2 Boxscore
10 Jul	20:30	Belgium	0–3	Italy	20–25	16–25	19–25			55–75	4,758	P2 Boxscore
11 Jul	16:30	Canada	2–3	Italy	25–22	29–27	23–25	23–25	5–15	105–114	6,748	P2 Boxscore
11 Jul	20:00	China	1–3	Dominican Republic	22–25	25–21	23–25	24–26		94–97	8,372	P2 Boxscore
12 Jul	11:00	Belgium	0–3	Ukraine	23–25	20–25	13–25			56–75	3,372	P2 Boxscore
12 Jul	16:30	Canada	3–1	Dominican Republic	25–20	17–25	25–22	25–18		92–85	7,926	P2 Boxscore
12 Jul	20:00	China	2–3	Italy	19–25	25–21	25–22	12–25	12–15	93–108	9,583	P2 Boxscore

==== Pool 9 ====
- All times are Japan Standard Time (UTC+09:00).

Date	Time		Score		Set 1	Set 2	Set 3	Set 4	Set 5	Total	Attd	Report
8 Jul	12:00	Turkey	3–1	Poland	27–25	20–25	25–19	25–19		97–88	2,674	P2 Boxscore
8 Jul	15:30	Thailand	0–3	United States	21–25	18–25	20–25			59–75	3,053	P2 Boxscore
8 Jul	19:20	Japan	1–3	Brazil	20–25	25–19	19–25	23–25		87–94	7,145	P2 Boxscore
9 Jul	13:00	United States	2–3	Poland	25–20	20–25	23–25	25–18	12–15	105–103	1,395	P2 Boxscore
9 Jul	19:20	Japan	3–1	Thailand	25–15	25–21	22–25	25–22		97–83	7,338	P2 Boxscore
10 Jul	13:00	United States	3–2	Turkey	22–25	25–23	27–29	25–21	15–8	114–106	2,193	P2 Boxscore
10 Jul	19:20	Poland	1–3	Brazil	20–25	25–23	23–25	26–28		94–101	3,474	P2 Boxscore
11 Jul	15:30	Thailand	3–0	Brazil	25–15	25–16	25–17			75–48	2,885	P2 Boxscore
11 Jul	19:20	Japan	1–3	Turkey	22–25	25–22	22–25	22–25		91–97	7,262	P2 Boxscore
12 Jul	12:00	United States	3–0	Brazil	26–24	25–22	25–16			76–62	5,032	P2 Boxscore
12 Jul	15:30	Thailand	1–3	Turkey	27–25	21–25	19–25	22–25		89–100	5,798	P2 Boxscore
12 Jul	19:20	Japan	3–2	Poland	20–25	14–25	25–19	25–21	15–13	99–103	7,107	P2 Boxscore

== Final round ==
- All times are Macau Standard Time (UTC+08:00).

Quarter-finals
23 July
United States	2
China	3
23 July
Turkey	3
Canada	1
22 July
Brazil	3
Japan	1
22 July
Italy	3
Netherlands	0

Semi-finals
25 July
China	0
Turkey	3
25 July
Brazil	3
Italy	2

Final
26 July
Turkey	3
Brazil	1
Third place match
26 July
China	1
Italy	3

=== Quarter-finals ===
Date	Time		Score		Set 1	Set 2	Set 3	Set 4	Set 5	Total	Attd	Report
22 Jul	16:00	Italy	3–0	Netherlands	25–21	25–16	25–16			75–53	1,800	P2 Boxscore
22 Jul	19:30	Brazil	3–1	Japan	24–26	25–22	25–16	25–20		99–84	3,600	P2 Boxscore
23 Jul	16:00	Turkey	3–1	Canada	22–25	25–21	25–21	25–17		97–84	2,000	P2 Boxscore
23 Jul	19:30	United States	2–3	China	25–15	23–25	20–25	25–17	13–15	106–97	4,400	P2 Boxscore

=== Semi-finals ===
Date	Time		Score		Set 1	Set 2	Set 3	Set 4	Set 5	Total	Attd	Report
25 Jul	16:00	Brazil	3–2	Italy	21–25	25–21	26–24	21–25	15–12	108–107	3,500	P2 Boxscore
25 Jul	19:30	China	0–3	Turkey	21–25	15–25	20–25			56–75	4,700	P2 Boxscore

=== Third place match ===
Date	Time		Score		Set 1	Set 2	Set 3	Set 4	Set 5	Total	Attd	Report
26 Jul	15:30	China	1–3	Italy	16–25	25–23	22–25	13–25		76–98	3,600	P2 Boxscore

=== Final ===
Date	Time		Score		Set 1	Set 2	Set 3	Set 4	Set 5	Total	Attd	Report
26 Jul	19:30	Turkey	3–1	Brazil	23–25	25–23	26–24	25–21		99–93	4,000	P2 Boxscore

== Final standing ==
Rank	Team
1st place, gold medalist(s)	Turkey
2nd place, silver medalist(s)	Brazil
3rd place, bronze medalist(s)	Italy
4	China
5	United States
6	Canada
7	Japan
8	Netherlands
9	Poland
10	Czech Republic
11	Serbia
12	Germany
13	Belgium
14	Thailand
15	Dominican Republic
16	Ukraine
17	France
18	Bulgaria

2026 Women's VNL champions

Turkey
Second title

14–woman roster
Gizem Örge (c), Cansu Özbay, Melissa Vargas, Saliha Şahin, Hande Baladın, Sinead Jack, Eylül Akarçeşme, Elif Şahin, Deniz Uyanık, Berka Buse Özden, Zehra Güneş, Yaprak Erkek, İlkin Aydın, Defne Başyolcu
Head coach
Daniele Santarelli

== Awards ==
According to the competition regulations, individual prize money totaling $100,000 would be awarded. A total of $70,000 was distributed among the statistical leaders of the preliminary phase ($10,000 per category), while a $30,000 prize was allocated for the MVP, selected from the gold medal match participants via a combined voting process between fans and designated volleyball experts.

Canada's Kiera Van Ryk was the only player selected in two statistical categories, leading both total points scored and total attack points. Ukraine and France each earned their first individual VNL preliminary awards through Daria Sharhorodska and Juliette Gelin, respectively.

- Most valuable player
  (Turkey) Melissa Vargas
- Best scorer
  (Canada) Kiera Van Ryk
- Best attacker
  (Canada) Kiera Van Ryk
- Best blocker
  (Brazil) Júlia Kudiess
- Best server
  (Italy) Ekaterina Antropova
- Best setter
  (Ukraine) Daria Sharhorodska
- Best digger
  (France) Juliette Gelin
- Best receiver
  (Serbia) Bojana Gočanin

== Statistics leaders ==
=== Preliminary round ===
Statistics leaders correct at the end of preliminary round.

Best Scorers (Note: Best scorers determined by scored points from spike, block and serve.)
	Player	Attacks	Blocks	Serves	Total
1	(Canada) Kiera Van Ryk	226	21	24	271
2	(Belgium) Pauline Martin	214	12	7	233
3	(China) Zhuang Yushan	188	25	5	218
3	(Japan) Yukiko Wada	205	6	7	218
5	(Turkey) Melissa Vargas	189	7	14	210

Best Attackers (Note: Best attackers determined by successful spikes.)
	Player	Spikes	Faults	Shots	%	Total
1	(Canada) Kiera Van Ryk	226	93	196	43.88	515
2	(Belgium) Pauline Martin	214	72	252	39.78	538
3	(Japan) Yukiko Wada	205	45	203	45.25	453
4	(Turkey) Melissa Vargas	189	36	127	53.69	352
5	(China) Zhuang Yushan	188	68	240	37.90	496

Best Blockers (Note: Best blockers determined by the stuff blocks, faults and rebounds.)
	Player	Blocks	Faults	Rebounds	Total
1	(Brazil) Júlia Kudiess	42	56	73	171
2	(Canada) Emily Maglio	40	64	93	197
3	(Czech Republic) Magdaléna Jehlářová	39	55	75	169
4	(Czech Republic) Ela Koulisiani	37	62	56	155
5	(Poland) Maja Koput	35	51	65	151

Best Servers (Note: Best servers determined by aces, faults and hits.)
	Player	Aces	Faults	Hits	Total
1	(Italy) Ekaterina Antropova	36	27	140	203
2	(Canada) Kiera Van Ryk	24	55	106	185
3	(France) Iman Ndiaye	14	33	68	115
3	(Turkey) Melissa Vargas	14	32	92	138
5	(Poland) Julia Szczurowska	13	15	36	64
5	(Ukraine) Daria Sharhorodska	13	13	131	157

Best Setters (Note: Best setters determined by running setts, faults and still sets.)
	Player	Running	Faults	Still	Total
1	(Ukraine) Daria Sharhorodska	410	4	770	1184
2	(Serbia) Slađana Mirković	407	5	731	1143
3	(Germany) Sarah Straube	351	6	711	1068
4	(Canada) Brie Fransen	348	7	693	1048
5	(China) Zhang Zixuan	330	3	624	957

Best Diggers (Note: Best diggers determined by successful digs, faults and receptions.)
	Player	Digs	Faults	Receptions	Total
1	(France) Juliette Gelin	203	59	69	331
2	(Italy) Eleonora Fersino	184	43	61	288
3	(Poland) Aleksandra Szczygłowska	177	47	51	275
4	(Germany) Annie Cesar	148	33	49	230
5	(Serbia) Bojana Gočanin	143	46	46	235

Best Receivers (Note: Best receivers determined by efficient receptions, faults and serve receptions.)
	Player	Excellents	Faults	Serve	Total
1	(Serbia) Bojana Gočanin	115	12	195	322
2	(Ukraine) Oleksandra Milenko	105	14	191	310
3	(Thailand) Sasipaporn Janthawisut	85	5	230	320
3	(China) Zhuang Yushan	85	15	189	289
5	(Japan) Mayu Ishikawa	83	12	215	310

=== Final round ===
Statistics leaders correct at the end of final round.

Best Scorers
	Player	Attacks	Blocks	Serves	Total
1	(Turkey) Melissa Vargas	71	4	8	83
2	(Brazil) Ana Cristina de Souza	67	6	5	78
3	(Brazil) Julia Bergmann	45	6	3	54
4	(Italy) Ekatarina Antropova	37	5	8	50
5	(China) Zhuang Yushan	39	3	4	46

Best Attackers
	Player	Spikes	Faults	Shots	%	Total
1	(Turkey) Melissa Vargas	71	13	52	52.21	136
2	(Brazil) Ana Cristina de Souza	67	24	61	44.08	152
3	(Brazil) Julia Bergmann	45	19	64	35.16	128
4	(Brazil) Rosamaria Montibeller	41	13	44	41.84	98
5	(China) Zhuang Yushan	39	11	59	35.78	109
5	(Turkey) Hande Baladın	39	10	24	53.42	73

Best Blockers
	Player	Blocks	Faults	Rebounds	Total
1	(Brazil) Luzia Nezzo	10	11	22	43
2	(China) Wang Yuanyuan	8	7	9	24
2	(Turkey) Zehra Güneş	8	13	23	44
2	(Brazil) Diana Duarte	8	18	17	43
3	(Turkey) Elif Şahin	6	4	11	21
3	(Brazil) Ana Cristina de Souza	6	12	9	27
3	(Brazil) Julia Bergmann	6	4	6	16
3	(Italy) Sarah Fahr	6	16	16	38

Best Servers
	Player	Aces	Faults	Hits	Total
1	(Turkey) Melissa Vargas	8	10	32	50
1	(Italy) Ekatarina Antropova	8	9	37	54
2	(Brazil) Ana Cristina de Souza	5	5	39	49
3	(China) Zhuang Yushan	4	4	24	32
3	(Canada) Kiera Van Ryk	4	6	8	18
3	(Brazil) Luzia Nezzo	4	4	24	32

Best Setters
	Player	Running	Faults	Still	Total
1	(Turkey) Elif Şahin	88	1	206	295
2	(China) Diao Linyu	69	0	125	194
3	(Italy) Alessia Orro	65	1	209	275
4	(Brazil) Roberta Ratzke	63	0	228	293
5	(Japan) Nanami Seki	46	0	68	114

Best Diggers
	Player	Digs	Faults	Receptions	Total
1	(China) Wang Mengjie	42	14	16	72
1	(Brazil) Marcelle Arruda	42	10	12	64
2	(Italy) Eleonora Fersino	40	10	20	70
3	(Turkey) Melissa Vargas	35	6	5	46
4	(Turkey) Gizem Örge	34	9	20	63
4	(Brazil) Roberta Ratzke	34	13	13	60
5	(Brazil) Ana Cristina de Souza	31	7	12	60

Best Receivers
	Player	Excellents	Faults	Serve	Total
1	(Brazil) Julia Bergmann	28	3	78	109
2	(Turkey) Hande Baladın	20	8	49	77
3	(Turkey) İlkin Aydın	19	2	53	74
4	(Brazil) Ana Cristina de Souza	18	9	70	97
5	(China) Zhuang Yushan	17	4	49	70

== See also ==
- 2026 FIVB Men's Volleyball Nations League
- 2026 FIVB Volleyball Girls' U17 World Championship
