= 2026–27 Galatasaray S.K. (women's volleyball) season =

Women's volleyball season

Galatasaray Daikin
2026–27 season
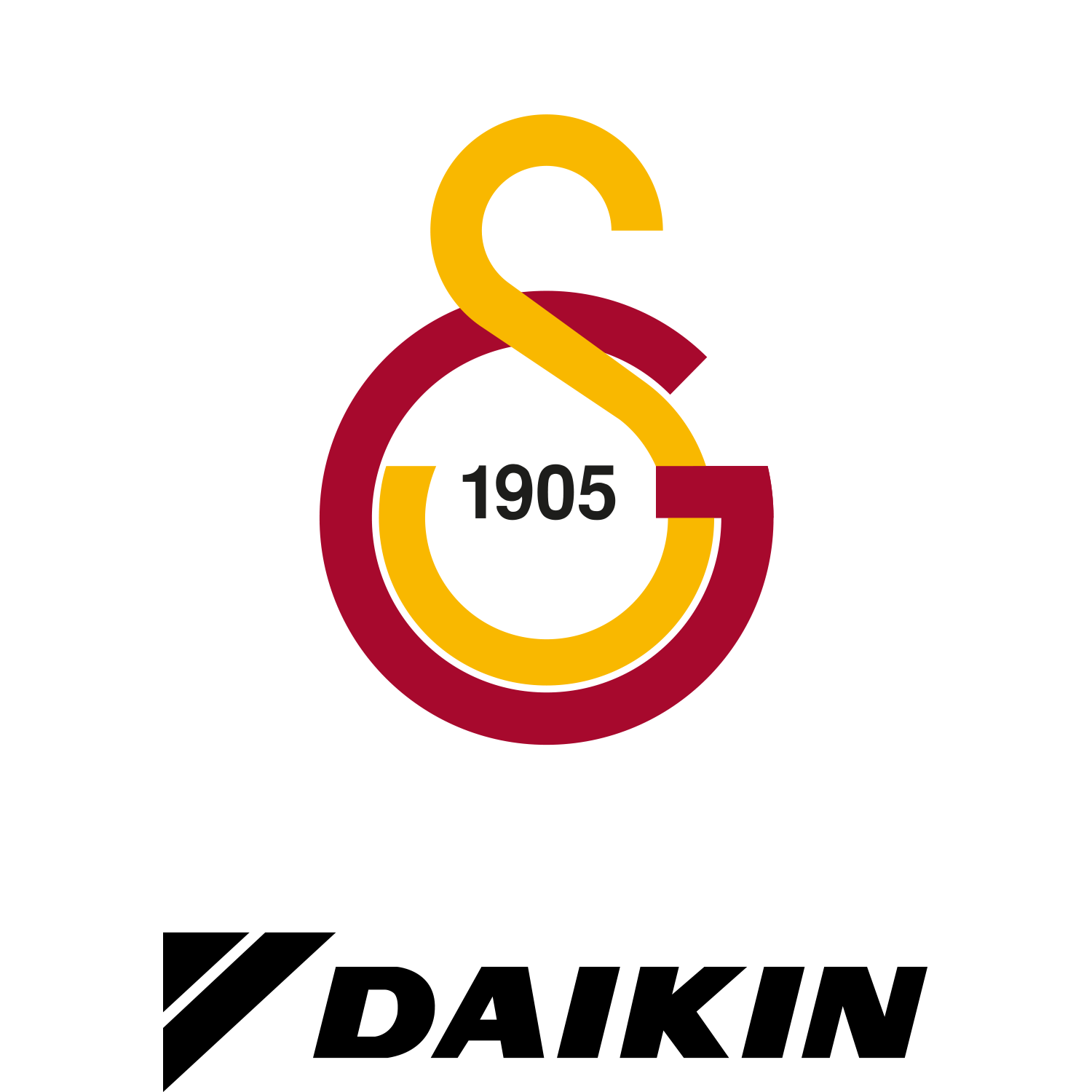
- President: Dursun Özbek
- Head coach: Alberto Bigarelli
- Arena: TVF Burhan Felek Sport Hall
- Turkish Women's Volleyball League: Regular season
- CEV Women's Champions League: Pre-season
- Turkish Women's Volleyball Cup: Pre-season

Galatasaray women volleyball squad in October 2026 against İlbank

It is the 2026–27 season of the Women's Volleyball team of Galatasaray Sports Club.

== Season overview ==
=== Pre-season ===
On 7 July, It has been announced that Neşve Büyükbayram, who served as the Women's Volleyball Team Manager, has parted ways with the club.

On 15 July, Gizem Giraygil Varol has been appointed as the Women's Volleyball Team Manager.

On 13 August, Vodafone Sultans League 2026–27 Volleyball Season Fixtures Have Been Drawn.

On 23 August, Canberk Tekmen has been appointed as the assistant coach of the Galatasaray Women's Volleyball Team.

On 31 August, Ahmet Akgümüş has been appointed as the statistics coach for the Galatasaray Women's Volleyball Team.

=== November ===
On 7 November, Onur Çarıkçı has been appointed as the assistant coach of the Galatasaray Women's Volleyball Team.

== Sponsorship and kit manufacturers ==
- Supplier: Puma
- Name sponsor: Daikin
- Main sponsor: Daikin
- Back sponsor: 1905 GSYİAD
- Sleeve sponsor: —
- Lateral sponsor: Madeş Mobilya
- Short sponsor: Ceysin İnşaat
- Socks sponsor: —

== Technical Staff ==
As of 7 November 2026

Name	Job
(Turkey) Neslihan Turan	Administrative Manager of Volleyball Teams
(Turkey) Mustafa Yurdaer Kobal	Assistant Administrative Manager
(Turkey) Gizem Giraygil Varol	Women's Volleyball Team Manager
(Italy) Alberto Bigarelli	Head Coach
(Turkey) Emre Türkileri	Assistant Coach
(Turkey) Canberk Tekmen	Assistant Coach
(Greece) Ioannis Paraschidis	Assistant Coach / Conditioner
(Turkey) Egemen Ekmen	Assistant Coach
(Turkey) Onur Çarıkçı	Assistant Coach
(Turkey) Ahmet Akgümüş	Statistics Coach
(Spain) Marta Gutiérrez Pérez	Physiotherapist
(Turkey) Murat Beder	Masseur
(Turkey) Özkan Arslan	Outfitter

=== Staff changes ===
Change	Date	Staff member	Staff position	Ref.
Out	7 July 2026	(Turkey) Neşve Büyükbayram	Team Manager	
In	15 July 2026	(Turkey) Gizem Giraygil Varol	Team Manager	
Out	August 2026	(Turkey) Oğulcan Akbal	Statistics Coach	
In	August 2026	(Turkey) Canberk Tekmen	Assistant Coach	
In	August 2026	(Turkey) Egemen Ekmen	Assistant Coach	
In	31 August 2026	(Turkey) Ahmet Akgümüş	Statistics Coach	
Out	9 September 2026	(Turkey) Dinçer Kaya	Physiotherapist	
In	9 September 2026	(Spain) Marta Gutiérrez Pérez	Physiotherapist	
In	7 November 2026	(Turkey) Onur Çarıkçı	Assistant Coach	

== Team roster ==
As of 30 September 2026

No.	Player	Position	Date of Birth	Height (m)	Country
1	Gizem Çerağ Düzeltir	Libero	15 April 1996 (age 30)	1.70	Turkey
2	İlkin Aydın (c)	Outside Hitter	5 January 2000 (age 26)	1.83	Turkey
3	Eylül Karadaş	Setter	3 September 2001 (age 25)	1.78	Turkey
4	Ege Melisa Bükmen	Outside Hitter	24 February 2004 (age 22)	1.81	Turkey
5	Ayça Aykaç	Libero	27 February 1996 (age 30)	1.75	Turkey
7	Wang Yuanyuan	Middle-blocker	14 July 1997 (age 29)	1.96	China
8	Yasemin Güveli	Middle-blocker	5 January 1999 (age 27)	1.90	Turkey
10	Merve Tanyel	Outside Hitter	6 February 1996 (age 30)	1.77	Turkey
12	Britt Bongaerts	Setter	3 November 1996 (age 30)	1.85	Netherlands
13	Janset Cemre Erkul	Middle-blocker	12 January 1997 (age 29)	1.86	Turkey
14	Alexia Căruțașu	Opposite	10 June 2003 (age 23)	1.88	Romania / Turkey
17	Myriam Sylla	Outside Hitter	8 January 1995 (age 31)	1.84	Italy
22	Vita Akimova	Opposite	16 July 2002 (age 24)	1.97	Russia
28	İlayda Uçak	Middle-blocker	28 November 2002 (age 23)	1.88	Turkey
35	Ezgi Akın	Middle-blocker	19 December 2007 (age 18)	1.86	Turkey

== Transfers ==
=== New contracts ===
Date	Player	Contract length	Source
1 August 2026	(China) Wang Yuanyuan	1-year	
4 August 2026	(Turkey) Yasemin Güveli	1-year	

=== Transfers in ===
Date	Player	Transferred from	Type	Fee	Source
17 July 2026	(Turkey) Ayça Aykaç	(Turkey) VakıfBank	1-year + 1-year	Free	
19 July 2026	(Russia) Vita Akimova	(Italy) Numia Vero Volley Milano	1-year	Free	
21 July 2026	(Turkey) Janset Cemre Erkul	(Turkey) Zeren Spor Kulübü	1-year	Free	
23 July 2026	(Turkey) Ege Melisa Bükmen	(Turkey) Kuzeyboru	1-year	Free	
28 July 2026	(Turkey) Eylül Karadaş	(Turkey) Zeren Spor Kulübü	1-year	Free	
9 August 2026	(Turkey) Gizem Çerağ Düzeltir	(Turkey) Aydın Büyükşehir Belediyespor	1-year	Free	
10 August 2026	(Turkey) İlayda Uçak	(Turkey) Göztepe SK	1-year	Free	
12 August 2026	(Turkey) Merve Tanyel	(Turkey) İlbank	1-year	Free	
30 September 2026	(Turkey) Ezgi Akın	(Turkey) Galatasaray ll	1-year	Free	

=== Transfers out ===
Date	Player	Transferred to	Fee	Source
5 June 2026	(Turkey) Ayçin Akyol	(Turkey) Zeren Spor Kulübü	End of contract	
5 June 2026	(Turkey) Aslı Tecimer	(Turkey) Bahçelievler Belediyespor	End of contract	
6 June 2026	(United States) Ali Frantti	(Turkey) İlbank	End of contract	
6 June 2026	(Turkey) Eylül Akarçeşme	(Turkey) VakıfBank	End of contract	
7 June 2026	(Belgium) Kaja Grobelna	(Italy) Igor Gorgonzola Novara	End of contract	
7 June 2026	(Netherlands) Eline Timmerman	(Greece) Panathinaikos	End of contract	
7 June 2026	(Turkey) Büşra Güneş	(Turkey) Türk Hava Yolları Spor Kulübü	End of contract	
7 June 2026	(Turkey) İrem Nur Özsoy	(Turkey) Aydın Büyükşehir Belediyespor	End of contract	
7 June 2026	(Turkey) Naz Aydemir	(Turkey) VakıfBank	End of contract	

== Pre-season and friendlies ==
Date	Time		Score		Set 1	Set 2	Set 3	Set 4	Set 5	Total	Report
8 September 2026	–	Galatasaray Daikin (Turkey)	–	(Turkey) Kuzeyboru	–	–	–	–	–	0–0	Report
12 September 2026	–	Galatasaray Daikin (Turkey)	–	(Turkey) Kuzeyboru	–	–	–	–	–	0–0	Report
17 September 2026	–	Galatasaray Daikin (Turkey)	–	(Romania) C.S.O. Voluntari 2005	–	–	–	–	–	0–0	Report
18 September 2026	–	Galatasaray Daikin (Turkey)	–	(Romania) C.S.O. Voluntari 2005	–	–	–	–	–	0–0	Report
20 September 2026	–	Galatasaray Daikin (Turkey)	–	(Greece) Panionios Betsson	–	–	–	–	–	0–0	Report
23 September 2026	–	Galatasaray Daikin (Turkey)	–	(Turkey) Nilüfer Belediyespor Eker	–	–	–	–	–	0–0	Report
29 September 2026	–	PAOK (Greece)	–	(Turkey) Galatasaray Daikin	–	–	–	–	–	0–0	Report
30 September 2026	–	Panionios Betsson (Greece)	–	(Turkey) Galatasaray Daikin	–	–	–	–	–	0–0	Report

== Competitions ==
=== Turkish Women's Volleyball League ===
==== Regular season (1st Half) ====
- All times are Europe Time (UTC+03:00).

Date	Time		Score		Set 1	Set 2	Set 3	Set 4	Set 5	Total	Report
4 October 2026	19:00	Türk Hava Yolları	3–2	Galatasaray Daikin	23–25	19–25	25–23	25–22	15–13	107–108	Report 1 Report 2
11 October 2026	13:00	Galatasaray Daikin	3–1	Nilüfer Belediyespor Eker	25–21	25–15	17–25	25–20	–	92–81	Report 1 Report 2
14 October 2026	16:00	Aras Kargo Spor Kulübü	3–2	Galatasaray Daikin	22–25	16–25	25–18	25–20	15–9	103–97	Report 1 Report 2
18 October 2026	19:00	Galatasaray Daikin	3–1	İlbank	21–25	25–21	25–23	25–15	–	96–84	Report 1 Report 2
25 October 2026	14:00	VakıfBank	3–0	Galatasaray Daikin	25–20	25–20	25–22	–	–	75–62	Report 1 Report 2
1 November 2026	19:00	Galatasaray Daikin	0–3	Fenerbahçe Medicana	22–25	18–25	18–25	–	–	58–75	Report 1 Report 2
4 November 2026	16:30	Manisa Büyükşehir Belediyespor Kulübü	0–3	Galatasaray Daikin	29–31	22–25	25–27	–	–	76–83	Report 1 Report 2
8 November 2026	14:00	Galatasaray Daikin	3–1	Beşiktaş	25–20	17–25	25–17	25–18	–	92–80	Report 1 Report 2
15 November 2026	16:00	Göztepe SK	1–3	Galatasaray Daikin	25–22	22–25	18–25	24–26	–	89–98	Report 1 Report 2
22 November 2026	13:00	Galatasaray Daikin	3–1	Zeren Spor Kulübü	26–24	25–20	20–25	25–14	–	96–83	Report 1 Report 2
29 November 2026	18:00	Eczacıbaşı Peron İstanbul	–	Galatasaray Daikin	–	–	–	–	–	0–0	Report
6 December 2026	16:00	Galatasaray Daikin	–	Kuzeyboru	–	–	–	–	–	0–0	Report
12 December 2026	13:00	Galatasaray Daikin	–	Afyon Belediye Yüntaş Spor Kulübü	–	–	–	–	–	0–0	Report

==== Regular season (2nd Half) ====
- All times are Europe Time (UTC+03:00).

Date	Time		Score		Set 1	Set 2	Set 3	Set 4	Set 5	Total	Report
–	–	Galatasaray Daikin	–	Türk Hava Yolları	–	–	–	–	–	0–0	
–	–	Nilüfer Belediyespor Eker	–	Galatasaray Daikin	–	–	–	–	–	0–0	
–	–	Galatasaray Daikin	–	Aras Kargo Spor Kulübü	–	–	–	–	–	0–0	
–	–	İlbank	–	Galatasaray Daikin	–	–	–	–	–	0–0	
–	–	Galatasaray Daikin	–	VakıfBank	–	–	–	–	–	0–0	
–	–	Fenerbahçe Medicana	–	Galatasaray Daikin	–	–	–	–	–	0–0	
–	–	Galatasaray Daikin	–	Manisa Büyükşehir Belediyespor Kulübü	–	–	–	–	–	0–0	
–	–	Beşiktaş	–	Galatasaray Daikin	–	–	–	–	–	0–0	
–	–	Galatasaray Daikin	–	Göztepe SK	–	–	–	–	–	0–0	
–	–	Zeren Spor Kulübü	–	Galatasaray Daikin	–	–	–	–	–	0–0	
–	–	Galatasaray Daikin	–	Eczacıbaşı Peron İstanbul	–	–	–	–	–	0–0	
–	–	Kuzeyboru	–	Galatasaray Daikin	–	–	–	–	–	0–0	
–	–	Afyon Belediye Yüntaş Spor Kulübü	–	Galatasaray Daikin	–	–	–	–	–	0–0	

=== Turkish Women's Volleyball Cup ===
==== Quarterfinals ====
- All times are Europe Time (UTC+03:00).

Date	Time		Score		Set 1	Set 2	Set 3	Set 4	Set 5	Total	Report
19 November 2026	19:00	Zeren Spor Kulübü	0–3	Galatasaray Daikin	23–25	14–25	18–25	–	–	55–75	Report 1 Report 2

=== CEV Women's Champions League ===
==== League round ====
===== Pool E =====
Pos	Team	Pld	W	L	Pts	SW	SL	SR	SPW	SPL	SPR
1	(Poland) PGE Budowlani Łódź	0	0	0	0	0	0	—	0	0	—
2	(Germany) VfB Suhl Thüringen	0	0	0	0	0	0	—	0	0	—
3	(Romania) C.S.O. Voluntari 2005	0	0	0	0	0	0	—	0	0	—
4	(Turkey) Galatasaray Daikin Istanbul	0	0	0	0	0	0	—	0	0	—

First match(es) will be played: 25 November 2026. Source: CEV

===== Matches =====
- All times are Europe Time (UTC+03:00).

Date	Time		Score		Set 1	Set 2	Set 3	Set 4	Set 5	Total	Report
25 November 2026	–	PGE Budowlani Łódź (Poland)	–	(Turkey) Galatasaray Daikin	–	–	–	–	–	0–0	Report
3 December 2026	–	Galatasaray Daikin (Turkey)	–	(Germany) VfB Suhl Thüringen	–	–	–	–	–	0–0	Report
15 December 2026	–	Galatasaray Daikin (Turkey)	–	(Romania) C.S.O. Voluntari 2005	–	–	–	–	–	0–0	Report
13 January 2027	–	VfB Suhl Thüringen (Germany)	–	(Turkey) Galatasaray Daikin	–	–	–	–	–	0–0	Report
28 January 2027	–	Galatasaray Daikin (Turkey)	–	(Poland) PGE Budowlani Łódź	–	–	–	–	–	0–0	Report
3 February 2027	–	C.S.O. Voluntari 2005 (Romania)	–	(Turkey) Galatasaray Daikin	–	–	–	–	–	0–0	Report

== See also ==
- Commons:Category:2026–27 Galatasaray (women's volleyball)
