= 2025–26 Galatasaray S.K. (women's volleyball) season =

Women's volleyball season

Galatasaray Daikin
2025–26 season
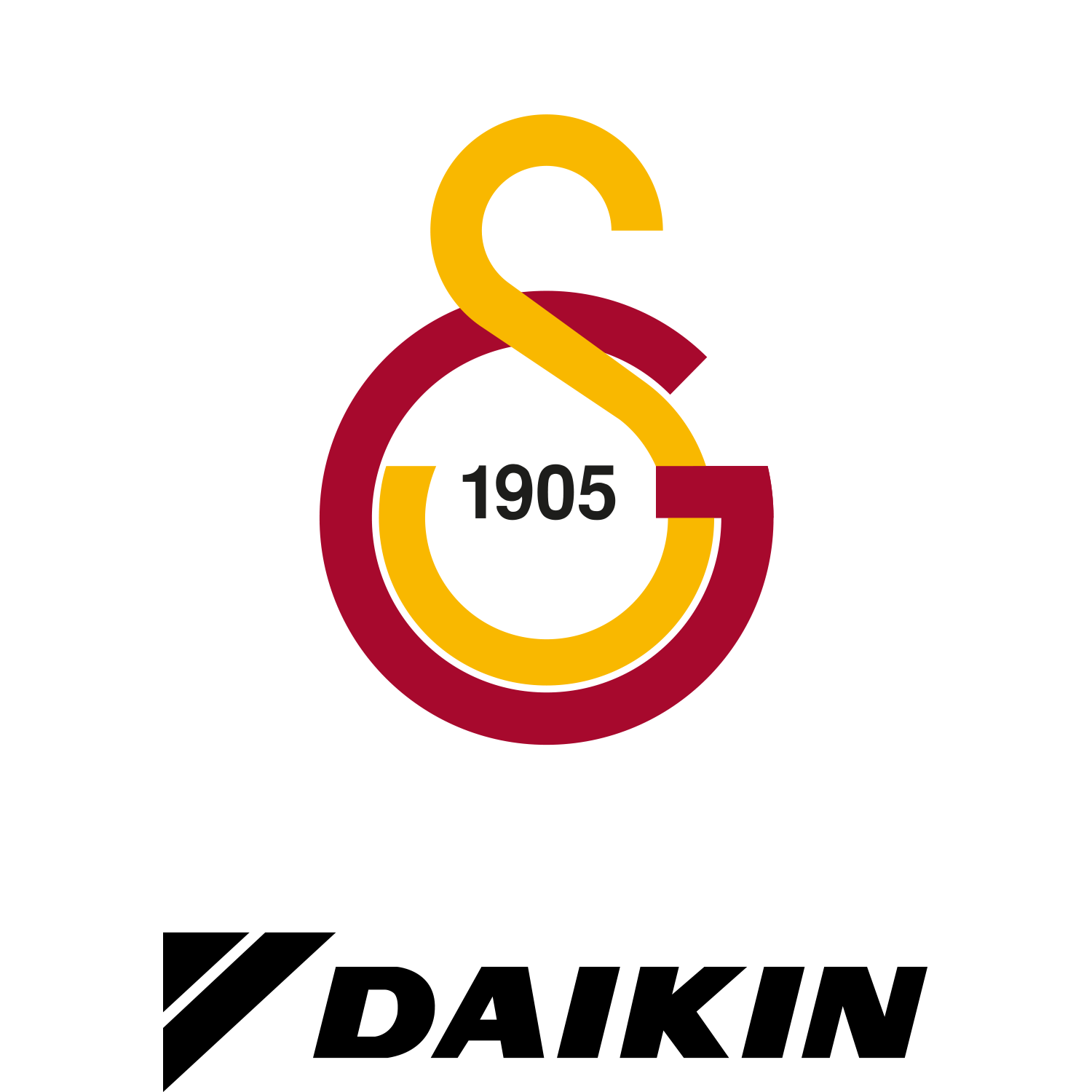
- President: Dursun Özbek
- Head coach: Massimo Barbolini (until 20 February 2026); Alberto Bigarelli (from 20 February 2026)
- Arena: TVF Burhan Felek Sport Hall
- Turkish Women's Volleyball League: 5th seed
- Playoffs: 5th
- Turkish Women's Volleyball Cup: Semifinals
- Women's CEV Cup: Winners

It is the 2025–26 season of the Women's Volleyball team of Galatasaray Sports Club.

== Season overview ==
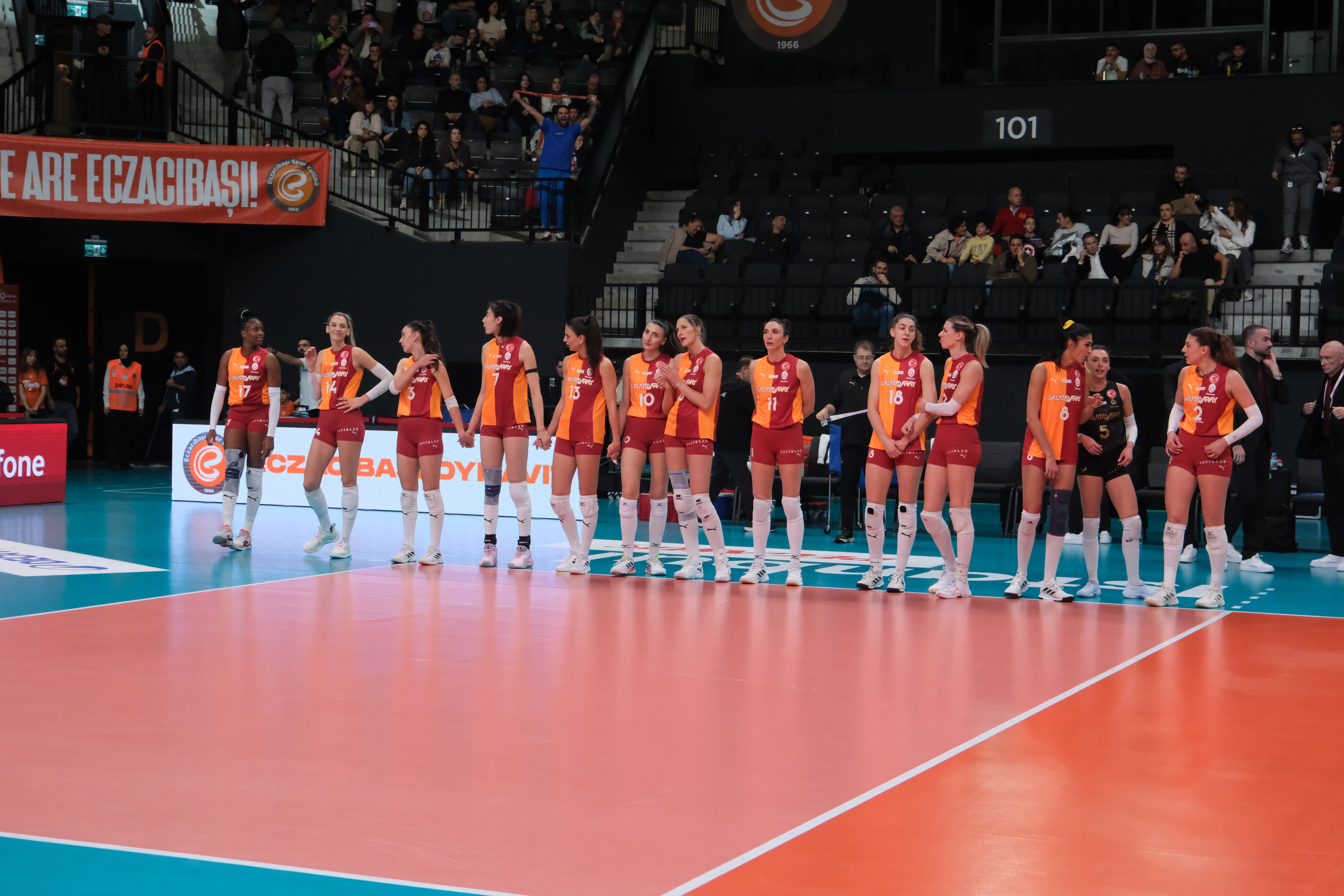
Galatasaray team (December 2025)

=== Pre-season ===
On 29 May, It was announced that a 2-year contract was signed with head coach Massimo Barbolini.

Galatasaray, who will compete in the CEV Cup, will face Portuguese representative FC Porto in the first round.

On 20 August, Vodafone Sultans League 2025–26 Volleyball Season Fixtures Have Been Drawn.

=== April ===
On 1 April, Galatasaray Daikin Women's Volleyball Team defeated Italy's Reale Mutua Fenera Chieri '76 3-2 in the first leg of the CEV Cup final.

On 8 April, Galatasaray Daikin Women's Volleyball Team became champions of the CEV Cup by defeating Italy's Reale Mutua Fenera Chieri '76 3-1 in the return match, after winning the first leg 3-2.

== Sponsorship and kit manufacturers ==
- Supplier: Puma
- Name sponsor: Daikin
- Main sponsor: Daikin
- Back sponsor: TikTak
- Sleeve sponsor: —
- Lateral sponsor: Akın Holding
- Short sponsor: Tacirler
- Socks sponsor: —

== Technical Staff ==
As of 21 February 2026

Name	Job
(Turkey) Neslihan Turan	Administrative Manager
(Turkey) Mustafa Yurdaer Kobal	Assistant Administrative Manager
(Turkey) Neşve Büyükbayram	Team Manager
(Italy) Alberto Bigarelli	Head Coach
(Turkey) Emre Türkileri	Assistant Coach
(Greece) Ioannis Paraschidis	Assistant Coach / Conditioner
(Turkey) Oğulcan Akbal	Statistics Coach
(Turkey) Dinçer Kaya	Physiotherapist
(Turkey) Murat Beder	Masseur
(Turkey) Defne Heybeli	Media Officer
(Turkey) Özkan Arslan	Outfitter

=== Staff changes ===
Change	Date	Staff member	Staff position	Ref.
In	20 June 2025	(Italy) Alberto Bigarelli	Assistant Coach	
Out	30 June 2025	(Turkey) Adnan Mert Paşaoğlu	Assistant Coach	
Out	20 February 2026	(Italy) Massimo Barbolini	Head Coach	
In	20 February 2026	(Italy) Alberto Bigarelli	Head Coach	

== Team roster ==
As of 24 February 2026

No.	Player	Position	Date of Birth	Height (m)	Country
1	Ali Frantti	Outside Hitter	3 March 1996 (age 30)	1.85	United States
2	İlkin Aydın (c)	Outside Hitter	5 January 2000 (age 26)	1.83	Turkey
3	Aslı Tecimer	Outside Hitter	12 May 2000 (age 26)	1.80	Turkey
4	İrem Nur Özsoy	Libero	13 June 2003 (age 23)	1.70	Turkey
5	Eylül Akarçeşme	Libero	1 October 1999 (age 27)	1.70	Turkey
7	Wang Yuanyuan	Middle-blocker	14 July 1997 (age 29)	1.96	China
8	Yasemin Güveli	Middle-blocker	5 January 1999 (age 27)	1.90	Turkey
9	Eline Timmerman	Middle-blocker	30 December 1998 (age 27)	1.92	Netherlands
10	Ayçin Akyol	Middle-blocker	15 June 1999 (age 27)	1.88	Turkey
11	Naz Aydemir	Setter	14 August 1990 (age 36)	1.86	Turkey
12	Britt Bongaerts	Setter	3 November 1996 (age 29)	1.85	Netherlands
13	Büşra Güneş	Middle-blocker	8 August 1997 (age 29)	1.90	Turkey
14	Alexia Căruțașu	Opposite	10 June 2003 (age 23)	1.88	Romania / Turkey
15	Kaja Grobelna	Opposite	4 January 1995 (age 31)	1.88	Belgium
17	Myriam Sylla	Outside Hitter	8 January 1995 (age 31)	1.84	Italy

== Transfers ==
=== New contracts ===
Date	Player	Contract length	Source
12 June 2025	(Turkey) Yasemin Güveli	1-year	
1 July 2025	(Turkey) İrem Nur Özsoy	1-year	
15 August 2025	(Netherlands) Eline Timmerman	1-year	
30 January 2026	(Turkey) İlkin Aydın	2-year	
2 February 2026	(Romania) (Turkey) Alexia Căruțașu	1-year + 1-year	

=== Transfers in ===
Date	Player	Transferred from	Fee	Source
12 June 2025	(Turkey) Naz Aydemir	(Turkey) Eczacıbaşı Dynavit	Free	
26 June 2025	(Belgium) Kaja Grobelna	(Japan) Queenseis Kariya	Free	
2 July 2025	(Turkey) Aslı Tecimer	(Turkey) İBB Spor Kulübü	Free	
3 July 2025	(Turkey) Büşra Güneş	(Turkey) Aras Kargo	Free	
4 July 2025	(United States) Ali Frantti	(Turkey) VakıfBank	Free	
11 August 2025	(Italy) Myriam Sylla	(Italy) Numia Vero Volley Milano	Free	
22 November 2025	(China) Wang Yuanyuan	(China) Tianjin Bohai Bank	Free	

=== Transfers out ===
Date	Player	Transferred to	Fee	Source
5 May 2025	(Georgia (country)) Ana Kalandadze	(Turkey) Aras Kargo	End of contract	
5 May 2025	(Turkey) Aslıhan Kılıç	(Turkey) Aras Kargo	End of contract	
5 May 2025	(Turkey) Bihter Dumanoğlu	(Turkey) Papara Göztepe	End of contract	
5 May 2025	(Turkey) Ceylan Arısan	(Turkey) Bahçelievler Belediye Spor Kulübü	End of contract	
6 May 2025	(Turkey) Sude Hacımustafaoğlu	(Turkey) Papara Göztepe	End of contract	
6 May 2025	(Serbia) Katarina Lazović	(Turkey) VakıfBank	End of contract	
6 May 2025	(Turkey) Yasemin Özel	(Turkey) Beşiktaş	End of contract	
23 February 2026	(Poland) Martyna Łukasik	(Italy) Imoco Volley	Contract termination	

=== Loans in ===
Date	Player	From	Fee	Source
30 June 2025	(Poland) Martyna Łukasik	(Italy) Imoco Volley	Undisclosed	

=== Loans out ===
Date	Player	Transferred to	Fee	Until	Source
17 August 2025	(Turkey) Melisa Sazalan	(Turkey) Bodrum Belediyesi Bodrumspor	Undisclosed	End of season	

== Pre-season and friendlies ==
Date	Time		Score		Set 1	Set 2	Set 3	Set 4	Set 5	Total	Report
3 September 2025	–	Galatasaray Daikin	2–2	İstanbul Büyükşehir Belediyespor	25–19	26–28	25–23	24–26	–	100–96	Report 1 Report 2
10 September 2025	15:30	Galatasaray Daikin	2–1	Beşiktaş	20–25	25–23	25–23	–	–	70–71	Report 1 Report 2
18 September 2025	–	Galatasaray Daikin	3–1	Tianjin Bohai Bank	25–17	25–20	18–25	26–24	–	94–86	Report 1 Report 2
30 September 2025	18:00	Eurotek Laica UYBA	3–0	Galatasaray Daikin	25–15	25–22	25–22	–	–	75–59	Report 1 Report 2
1 October 2025	21:00	Igor Gorgonzola Novara	3–0	Galatasaray Daikin	25–9	25–18	27–25	–	–	77–52	Report 1 Report 2
4 October 2025	–	Galatasaray Daikin	3–1	VakıfBank Spor Kulübü	–	–	–	–	–	0–0	Report 1 Report 2
5 October 2025	–	Eczacıbaşı Dynavit	2–2	Galatasaray Daikin	–	–	–	–	–	0–0	Report

== Competitions ==
=== Turkish Women's Volleyball League ===
==== Regular season (1st Half) ====
- All times are Europe Time (UTC+03:00).

Date	Time		Score		Set 1	Set 2	Set 3	Set 4	Set 5	Total	Report
12 October 2025	18:30	Galatasaray Daikin	3–0	Aydın Büyükşehir Belediyespor	25–16	26–24	25–23	–	–	76–63	Report 1 Report 2
18 October 2025	18:00	Kuzeyboru	0–3	Galatasaray Daikin	16–25	14–25	28–30	–	–	58–80	Report 1 Report 2
21 October 2025	18:30	Galatasaray Daikin	3–0	İlbank Spor Kulübü	25–12	25–16	25–16	–	–	75–44	Report 1 Report 2
26 October 2025	18:00	VakıfBank Spor Kulübü	3–0	Galatasaray Daikin	26–24	25–19	25–17	–	–	76–60	Report 1 Report 2
16 November 2025	17:00	Galatasaray Daikin	3–0	Bahçelievler Belediye Spor Kulübü	25–22	25–15	25–19	–	–	75–56	Report 1 Report 2
20 November 2025	19:30	Fenerbahçe Medicana	3–2	Galatasaray Daikin	27–25	22–25	25–23	25–27	15–11	114–111	Report 1 Report 2
23 November 2025	17:00	Galatasaray Daikin	3–0	Nilüfer Belediyespor Eker	25–16	25–23	25–16	–	–	75–55	Report 1 Report 2
30 November 2025	16:00	Aras Kargo	1–3	Galatasaray Daikin	25–23	21–25	19–25	13–25	–	78–98	Report 1 Report 2
7 December 2025	17:00	Galatasaray Daikin	3–1	Türk Hava Yolları	23–25	25–22	25–13	25–15	–	98–75	Report 1 Report 2
11 December 2025	18:00	Zeren Spor	3–2	Galatasaray Daikin	19–25	25–18	17–25	25–11	15–10	101–89	Report 1 Report 2
14 December 2025	19:00	Galatasaray Daikin	3–0	Beşiktaş	25–20	25–20	25–11	–	–	75–51	Report 1 Report 2
17 December 2025	18:00	Eczacıbaşı Dynavit	3–0	Galatasaray Daikin	25–23	25–17	25–21	–	–	75–61	Report 1 Report 2
21 December 2025	17:00	Göztepe Spor Kulübü	1–3	Galatasaray Daikin	20–25	17–25	25–22	21–25	–	83–97	Report 1 Report 2

==== Regular season (2nd Half) ====
- All times are Europe Time (UTC+03:00).

Date	Time		Score		Set 1	Set 2	Set 3	Set 4	Set 5	Total	Report
3 January 2026	15:00	Aydın Büyükşehir Belediyespor	0–3	Galatasaray Daikin	19–25	23–25	11–25	–	–	53–75	Report 1 Report 2
10 January 2026	19:00	Galatasaray Daikin	3–1	Kuzeyboru	25–19	25–14	22–25	25–20	–	97–78	Report 1 Report 2
17 January 2026	14:00	İlbank Spor Kulübü	0–3	Galatasaray Daikin	11–25	15–25	15–25	–	–	41–75	Report 1 Report 2
21 January 2026	17:00	Galatasaray Daikin	0–3	VakıfBank Spor Kulübü	17–25	18–25	15–25	–	–	50–75	Report 1 Report 2
24 January 2026	16:00	Bahçelievler Belediye Spor Kulübü	0–3	Galatasaray Daikin	17–25	18–25	21–25	–	–	56–75	Report 1 Report 2
1 February 2026	17:00	Galatasaray Daikin	0–3	Fenerbahçe Medicana	19–25	13–25	23–25	–	–	55–75	Report 1 Report 2
7 February 2026	18:00	Nilüfer Belediyespor Eker	3–0	Galatasaray Daikin	28–26	25–16	27–25	–	–	80–67	Report 1 Report 2
10 February 2026	19:00	Galatasaray Daikin	3–1	Aras Kargo	20–25	25–19	25–21	25–14	–	95–79	Report 1 Report 2
14 February 2026	19:00	Türk Hava Yolları	2–3	Galatasaray Daikin	25–23	22–25	25–16	19–25	12–15	103–104	Report 1 Report 2
21 February 2026	14:00	Galatasaray Daikin	3–1	Zeren Spor	25–14	25–18	22–25	25–22	–	97–79	Report 1 Report 2
28 February 2026	13:00	Beşiktaş	2–3	Galatasaray Daikin	15–25	25–22	22–25	25–23	8–15	95–110	Report 1 Report 2
7 March 2026	20:00	Galatasaray Daikin	2–3	Eczacıbaşı Dynavit	23–25	25–22	25–23	18–25	9–15	100–110	Report 1 Report 2
14 March 2026	13:00	Galatasaray Daikin	0–3	Göztepe Spor Kulübü	21–25	20–25	20–25	–	–	61–75	Report 1 Report 2

==== Playoffs ====
===== 5–8th place =====
- All times are Europe Time (UTC+03:00).

Date	Time		Score		Set 1	Set 2	Set 3	Set 4	Set 5	Total	Report
28 March 2026	15:00	Türk Hava Yolları	0–3	Galatasaray Daikin	21–25	17–25	11–25	–	–	49–75	Report 1 Report 2
12 April 2026	13:00	Galatasaray Daikin	3–2	Türk Hava Yolları	25–20	21–25	21–25	25–15	15–9	107–94	Report 1 Report 2

===== 5–6th place =====
- All times are Europe Time (UTC+03:00).

Date	Time		Score		Set 1	Set 2	Set 3	Set 4	Set 5	Total	Report
17 April 2026	19:00	Aras Kargo	1–3	Galatasaray Daikin	20–25	25–20	19–25	21–25	–	85–95	Report 1 Report 2
20 April 2026	14:00	Galatasaray Daikin	3–1	Aras Kargo	26–24	19–25	25–21	25–14	–	95–84	Report 1 Report 2

=== Turkish Women's Volleyball Cup ===
==== Quarterfinals ====
- All times are Europe Time (UTC+03:00).

Date	Time		Score		Set 1	Set 2	Set 3	Set 4	Set 5	Total	Report
4 March 2026	20:00	Galatasaray Daikin	3–0	Kuzeyboru	26–24	25–23	25–22	–	–	76–69	Report 1 Report 2

==== Semifinals ====
- All times are Europe Time (UTC+03:00).

Date	Time		Score		Set 1	Set 2	Set 3	Set 4	Set 5	Total	Report
24 March 2026	15:00	VakıfBank Spor Kulübü	3–0	Galatasaray Daikin	25–19	25–20	25–16	–	–	75–55	Report 1 Report 2

=== CEV Cup ===
==== 16th finals ====
- All times are Europe Time (UTC+03:00).

Date	Time		Score		Set 1	Set 2	Set 3	Set 4	Set 5	Total	Report
26 November 2025	23:00	FC Porto (Portugal)	1–3	(Turkey) Galatasaray Daikin	25–22	19–25	21–25	23–25	–	88–97	P2; Report 1 Report 2
3 December 2025	19:30	Galatasaray Daikin (Turkey)	3–0	(Portugal) FC Porto	25–17	25–17	25–17	–	–	75–51	P2; Report 1 Report 2

==== 8th finals ====
- All times are Europe Time (UTC+03:00).

Date	Time		Score		Set 1	Set 2	Set 3	Set 4	Set 5	Total	Report
7 January 2026	22:00	Darta Bevo Roeselare (Belgium)	0–3	(Turkey) Galatasaray Daikin	15–25	22–25	14–25	–	–	51–75	P2; Report 1 Report 2
14 January 2026	19:30	Galatasaray Daikin (Turkey)	3–1	(Belgium) Darta Bevo Roeselare	25–16	24–26	25–21	25–17	–	99–80	P2; Report 1 Report 2

==== Playoffs ====
- All times are Europe Time (UTC+03:00).

Date	Time		Score		Set 1	Set 2	Set 3	Set 4	Set 5	Total	Report
27 January 2026	19:30	Galatasaray Daikin (Turkey)	3–1	(Germany) Allianz MTV Stuttgart	25–12	21–25	25–16	25–10	–	96–63	P2; Report 1 Report 2
4 February 2026	21:30	Allianz MTV Stuttgart (Germany)	2–3	(Turkey) Galatasaray Daikin	25–23	25–23	21–25	23–25	11–15	105–111	P2; Report 1 Report 2

==== Quarterfinals ====
- All times are Europe Time (UTC+03:00).

Date	Time		Score		Set 1	Set 2	Set 3	Set 4	Set 5	Total	Report
17 February 2026	22:00	Levallois Paris Saint Cloud (France)	2–3	(Turkey) Galatasaray Daikin	26–24	19–25	25–13	18–25	9–15	97–102	Report 1 Report 2
25 February 2026	20:00	Galatasaray Daikin (Turkey)	3–1	(France) Levallois Paris Saint Cloud	22–25	25–21	25–22	25–17	–	97–85	Report 1 Report 2

==== Semifinals ====
- All times are Europe Time (UTC+03:00).

Date	Time		Score		Set 1	Set 2	Set 3	Set 4	Set 5	Total	Report
11 March 2026	20:30	Galatasaray Daikin (Turkey)	3–0	(Romania) C.S.O. Voluntari 2005	25–14	25–15	25–19	–	–	75–48	Report 1 Report 2
18 March 2026	20:00	C.S.O. Voluntari 2005 (Romania)	0–3	(Turkey) Galatasaray Daikin	13–25	10–25	8–25	–	–	31–75	Report 1 Report 2

==== Finals ====
- All times are Europe Time (UTC+03:00).

Date	Time		Score		Set 1	Set 2	Set 3	Set 4	Set 5	Total	Report
1 April 2026	21:00	Reale Mutua Fenera Chieri '76 (Italy)	2–3	(Turkey) Galatasaray Daikin	18–25	25–20	18–25	25–18	18–20	104–108	Report 1 Report 2
8 April 2026	20:00	Galatasaray Daikin (Turkey)	3–1	(Italy) Reale Mutua Fenera Chieri '76	25–27	25–22	25–18	25–18	–	100–85	Report 1 Report 2

== See also ==
- Commons:Category:2025–26 Galatasaray (women's volleyball)
