= İdil (name) =

İdil is a feminine Turkish given name and a feminine Somali given name. İdil means “pure and sincere love”. Another meaning the name carries is Volga in Turkic languages, referring to the river in Europe and the name of a district in Turkey.

In Somali, Idil means "complete" in the context of perfection. Contrary to popular belief, The Turkish and Somali forms of the name do not share the same root.

People named İdil or Idil include:

- İdil Naz Başcan (born 1999), Turkish volleyball player
- İdil Biret (born 1941), Turkish concert pianist
- İdil Fırat (born 1972), Turkish actress
- Idil Ibrahim is a Somali-American independent film director, producer, actress, writer.
- İdil Üner (born 1971), German-Turkish actress

== See also ==
- İdil, district of Şırnak Province
