= Turkish Women's Volleyball Championship =

- Sport: Volleyball
- Founded: 1956
- Folded: 1983
- Country: Turkey
- Last champion: Eczacıbaşı VitrA (11 titles)
- Most titles: Eczacıbaşı VitrA (11 titles)
- Website: tvf.org.tr

The Turkish Women's Volleyball Championship (Turkish: Türkiye Kadınlar Voleybol Şampiyonası) is a defunct volleyball league competition in Turkish volleyball, run by the Turkish Volleyball Federation from 1956 to 1983.

== Champions ==
Season	Champion	Runners-up	Third	Fourth	Date and place
1956	Fenerbahçe	İÜSBK	Modaspor	Gazi Eğitim Enstitüsü	İstanbul, 3-5/18 February 1956
1957	Fenerbahçe	TED Kolejliler	İÜSBK	-	İstanbul, 16–17 February 1957
1958	Fenerbahçe	TED Kolejliler	Galatasaray	Gazi Eğitim Enstitüsü	Ankara, 11–13 April 1958
1959	Fenerbahçe	Galatasaray	Ankara Demirspor	Gazi Eğitim Enstitüsü	İstanbul, 9–11 April 1959
1960	Fenerbahçe	Galatasaray	Ankara Demirspor	Rasimpaşa	Ankara, 6–8 May 1960
1961	Galatasaray	Fenerbahçe	Ankara Demirspor	TED Kolejliler	Ankara, 23–26 March 1961
1962	Galatasaray	Rasimpaşa	Fenerbahçe	TED Kolejliler	Ankara, 26 Nisan-1 May 1962
1963	Galatasaray	Ankara Demirspor	TED Kolejliler	Konya İstasyon	Adana, 5–7 April 1963
1964	Galatasaray	Rasimpaşa	TED Kolejliler	Ankara Demirspor	İzmir, 19–23 March 1964
1965	-	Rasimpaşa	Galatasaray	Ankara Demirspor	Manisa, 19–25 April 1965
1966	Galatasaray	Rasimpaşa	TED Kolejliler	Ankara Demirspor	İstanbul, 30 March-4 April 1966
1967	Rasimpaşa	Galatasaray	TED Kolejliler	Ankara Demirspor	Ankara, 29 March-3 April 1967
1968	Fenerbahçe	TED Kolejliler	SSK	Galatasaray	İstanbul, 19–23 April 1968
1969	Fenerbahçe	TED Kolejliler	Galatasaray	Ankara Demirspor	Ankara, 15–19 May 1969
1970	TED Kolejliler	Gençlerbirliği	Eczacıbaşı	Ankara Demirspor	İstanbul 16–19 May 1970
1971	Gençlerbirliği	TED Kolejliler	Eczacıbaşı	Fenerbahçe	Manisa, 19–22 May 1971
1972	Fenerbahçe	Eczacıbaşı	Ankara Demirspor	TED Kolejliler	Kütahya, 27 April-1 May 1972
1973	Eczacıbaşı	Fenerbahçe	Mülkiye	TED Kolejliler	Adapazarı, 14–18 March 1973
1974	Eczacıbaşı	Galatasaray	Fenerbahçe	Mülkiye	Bursa, 13–17 March 1974
1975	Eczacıbaşı	Fenerbahçe	Galatasaray	Mülkiye	Ankara, 23–27 May 1975
1976	Eczacıbaşı	Galatasaray	Mülkiye	TED Kolejliler	Ankara, 21–25 April 1976
1977	Eczacıbaşı	Galatasaray	Fenerbahçe	Mülkiye	İstanbul, 2–6 May 1977
1978	Eczacıbaşı	Galatasaray	Vinylex	TED Kolejliler	Adapazarı, 2–6 February 1978
1979	Eczacıbaşı	Büyükdere Boronkay	Galatasaray	TED Kolejliler	Ankara, 22–28 February 1979
1980	Eczacıbaşı	Arçelik	Eskişehir Bentspor	TED Kolejliler	İstanbul, 2–4 May 1980
1981	Eczacıbaşı	Arçelik	Ankara DSİ	Galatasaray	İstanbul, 11–15 March 1981
1982	Eczacıbaşı	Arçelik	Profilo	Galatasaray	İstanbul, 19–26 June 1982
1983	Eczacıbaşı	Arçelik	Ankara Pazarları	Galatasaray	İstanbul, 15–19 February 1983

== All champions ==
Team	Winner	Runners-up
Eczacıbaşı	11	1
Fenerbahçe	8	3
Galatasaray	5	7
TED Kolejliler	1	5
Rasimpaşa	1	4
Gençlerbirliği	1	1
