= Ayçin Akyol =

Turkish volleyball player (born 1999)

Personal information
- Nationality: Turkey
- Born: 15 June 1999 (age 27)
- Hometown: Ankara
- Height: 188 cm (6 ft 2 in)
- Weight: 72 kg (159 lb)
- Spike: 305 cm (120 in)
- Block: 298 cm (117 in)

Volleyball information
- Position: Middle-blocker
- Current club: Zeren Spor Kulübü

Career
Years	Teams
2018–2022	(Turkey) Karayolları Spor Kulübü
2021	(Turkey) → Sigorta Shop Kalecik
2022–2026	(Turkey) Galatasaray
2026–	(Turkey) Zeren Spor Kulübü

National team
Turkey
Honours
Women's volleyball
Representing Turkey
Islamic Solidarity Games
Gold medal – first place	2021 Konya	Team

Ayçin Akyol (born 15 June 1999 in Ankara) is a Turkish volleyball player.

== Career ==
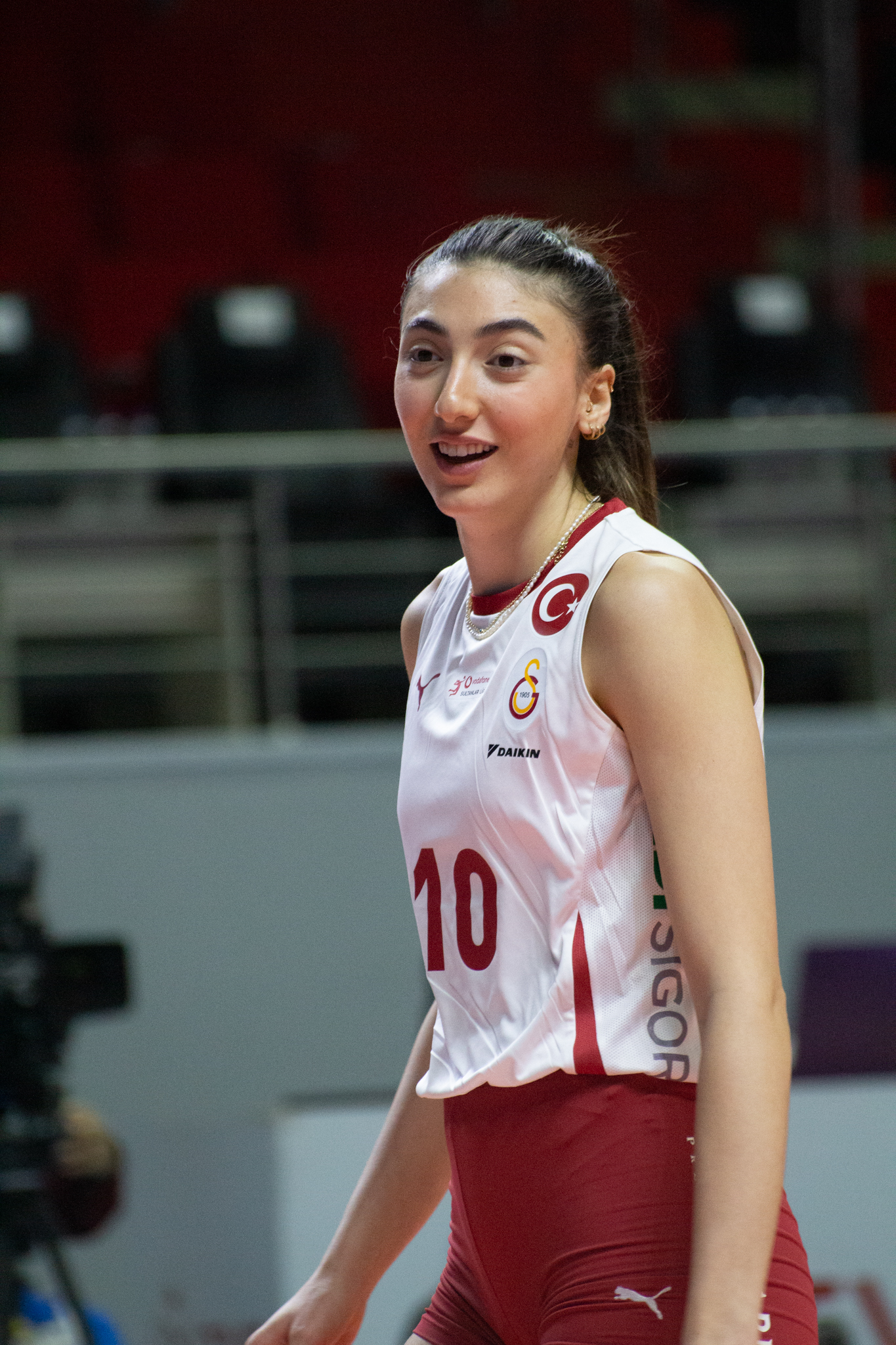
Ayçin Akyol in 2024

On 17 August 2022, she signed a 2-year contract with the Galatasaray HDI Sigorta.

She signed a new 2-year contract with Galatasaray on 26 January 2024.

Akyol left Galatasaray in 2026 and has signed to Zeren S.K in Ankara for the 2026/2027 professional season.

== Honours ==
=== Clubs ===
- 2023–24 BVA Cup Champion, with Galatasaray
- 2024–25 BVA Cup Champion, with Galatasaray
- 2025–26 CEV Cup Champion, with Galatasaray
