= Brankica Mihajlović =

Serbian volleyball player (born 1991)

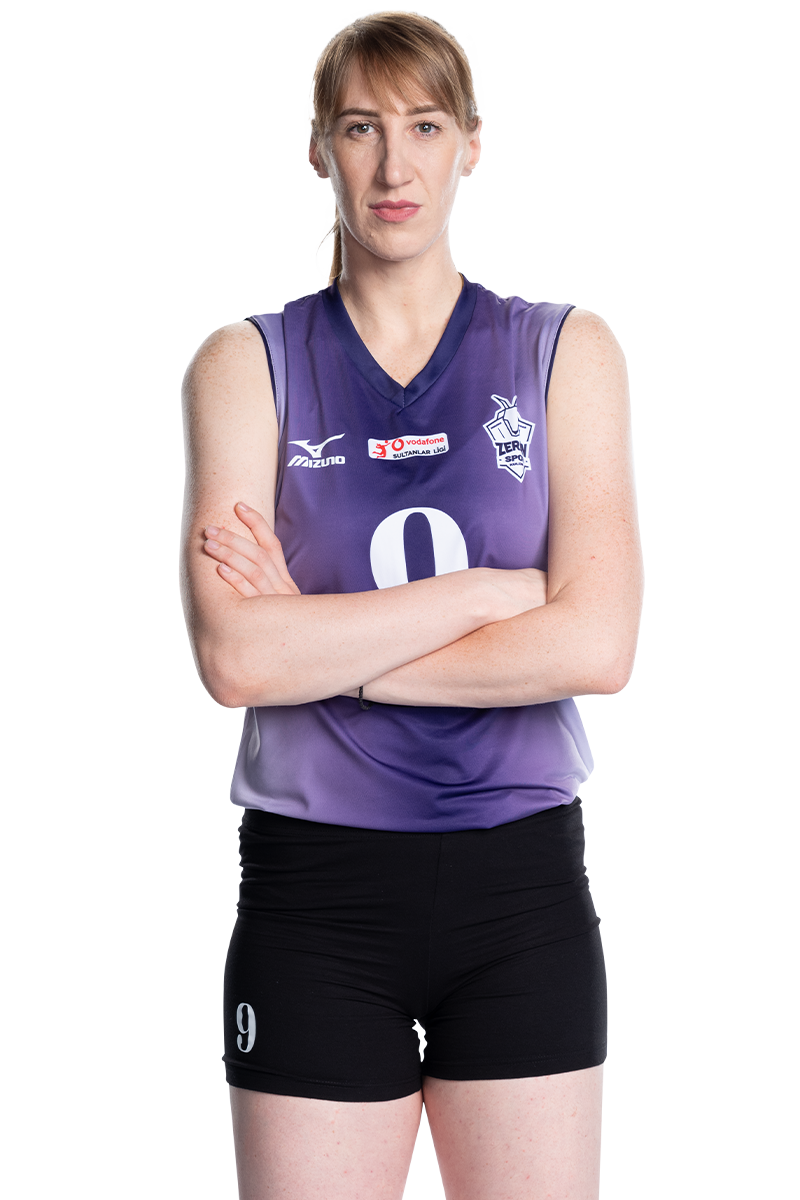
- Mihajlović in 2024

Personal information
- Nationality: Serbia
- Born: 13 April 1991 (age 35); Brčko, SR Bosnia and Herzegovina, Yugoslavia
- Height: 1.90 m (6 ft 3 in)
- Weight: 64 kg (141 lb)
- Spike: 302 cm (119 in)
- Block: 290 cm (114 in)

Volleyball information
- Position: Opposite hitter
- Current club: Zeren
- Number: 9

Career
| Years | Teams |
|---|---|
| 2006–2009; 2009–2011; 2011–2012; 2012–2013; 2013–2014; 2014; 2014–2015; 2015–2016; 2016–2017; 2017–2019; 2019–2021; 2021–2022; 2022–2023; 2023–2024; 2024–2024; 2024– | VC Jedinstvo Brčko; Voléro Zürich; Hyundai Hillstate; RC Cannes; Rio de Janeiro Vôlei Clube; Voléro Zürich; Hisamitsu Springs; Fenerbahçe Grundig; Tianjin Bridgestone; JT Marvelous; Fenerbahçe; Pallavolo Monza; Leningradka Saint Petersburg; Liaoning Tengda; Volero Le Cannet; Zeren |

National team
| Serbia |
Honours
Women's volleyball
Representing Serbia
Olympic Games
| Silver medal – second place | 2016 Rio de Janeiro | Team |
| Bronze medal – third place | 2020 Tokyo | Team |
FIVB World Championship
| Gold medal – first place | 2018 Japan | Team |
| Gold medal – first place | 2022 Netherlands/Poland | Team |
FIVB Nations League
| Bronze medal – third place | 2022 Ankara | Team |
European Championship
| Gold medal – first place | 2017 Azerbaijan/Georgia |
| Gold medal – first place | 2019 Turkey |
| Bronze medal – third place | 2015 Netherlands/Belgium |
World Cup
| Silver medal – second place | 2015 Japan |
FIVB World Grand Prix
| Bronze medal – third place | 2013 Sapporo |
| Bronze medal – third place | 2017 Nanjing |
European Games
| Bronze medal – third place | 2015 Baku | Team |
European League
| Bronze medal – third place | 2012 Karlovy Vary |

Brankica Mihajlović (Serbian Cyrillic: Бранкица Михајловић; born 13 April 1991) is a Serbian professional volleyball player. She plays for the Serbia women's national volleyball team where she won a silver medal at the 2016 Summer Olympics. She also competed in the 2012 Summer Olympics and the 2017 Women's European Volleyball Championship. In 2019, she returned to the Turkish club Fenerbahçe after a 3-year break. She is 1.90 m (6 ft 3 in) tall.

== Career ==
Mihajlović won the silver medal at the 2013 Club World Championship playing with Unilever Vôlei.

On 28 November 2014 Hisamitsu Springs announced she was joining the team. With this club, she played the 2015 FIVB Club World Championship.

== Awards ==
=== Individual ===
- 2013 World Grand Prix "Best outside spiker"
- 2015 World Cup "Best outside spiker"
- 2016 Olympic Games "Best outside spiker"
- 2017 Yeltsin Cup "Most valuable player"
- 2017 European Championship "Best outside spiker"
- 2017-2018 Japanese V.League "Excellent Player"
- 2018-2019 Japanese V.League "Best outside hitter"
- 2019 European Championship "Best outside spiker"

=== Clubs ===
- 2013 Club World Championship - Runner-up, with Unilever Vôlei
- 2013/14 Brazilian Volleyball Superliga - winner, with Unilever Vôlei
- 2014/15 Turkish Super Cup - winner, with Fenerbahçe Grundig
- 2016/17 Chinese Volleyball League - The third
- 2017/2018 Japanese National Championship - Runner-up, with JT Marvelous
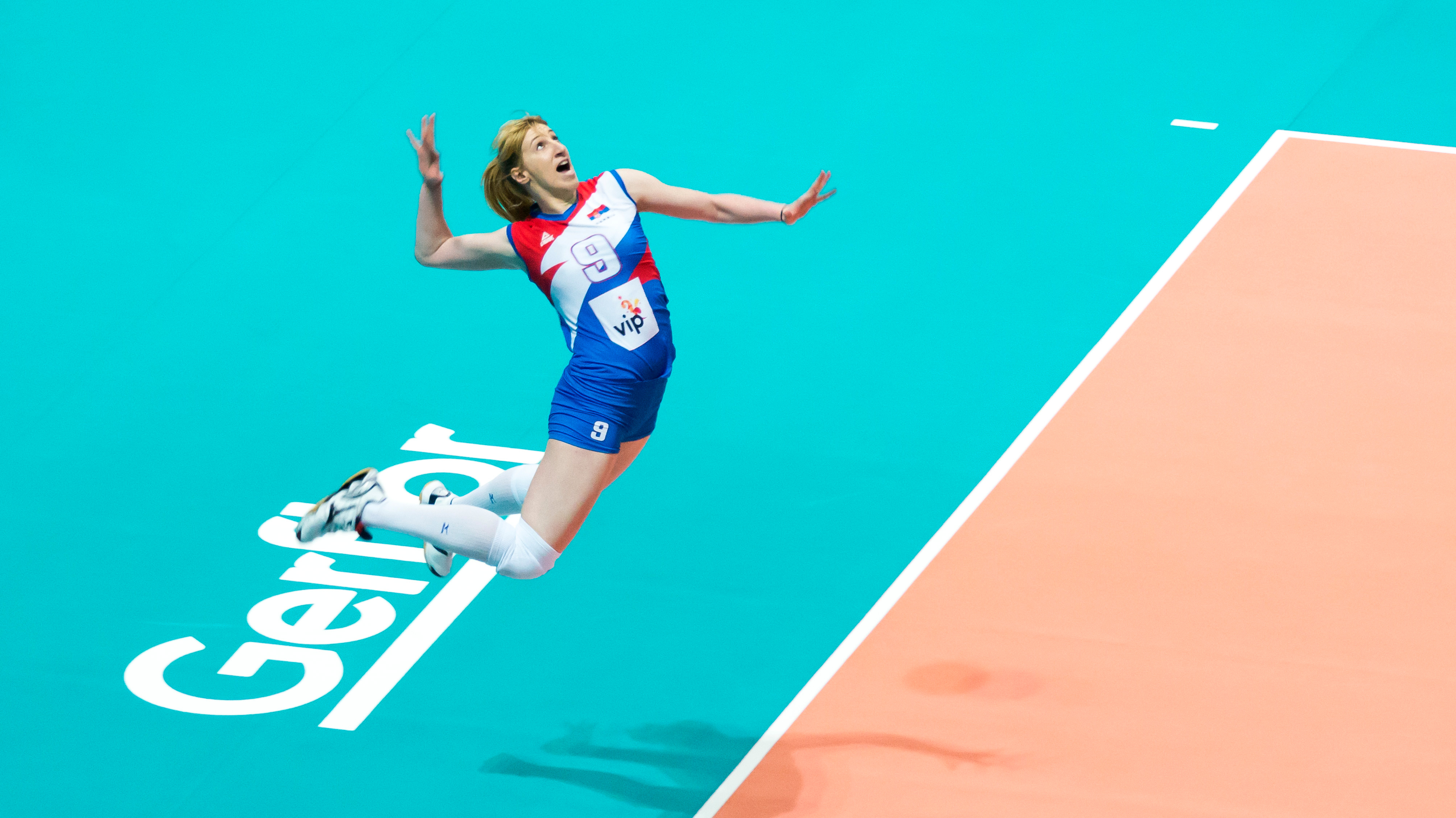
Brankica Mihajlović at jump serve

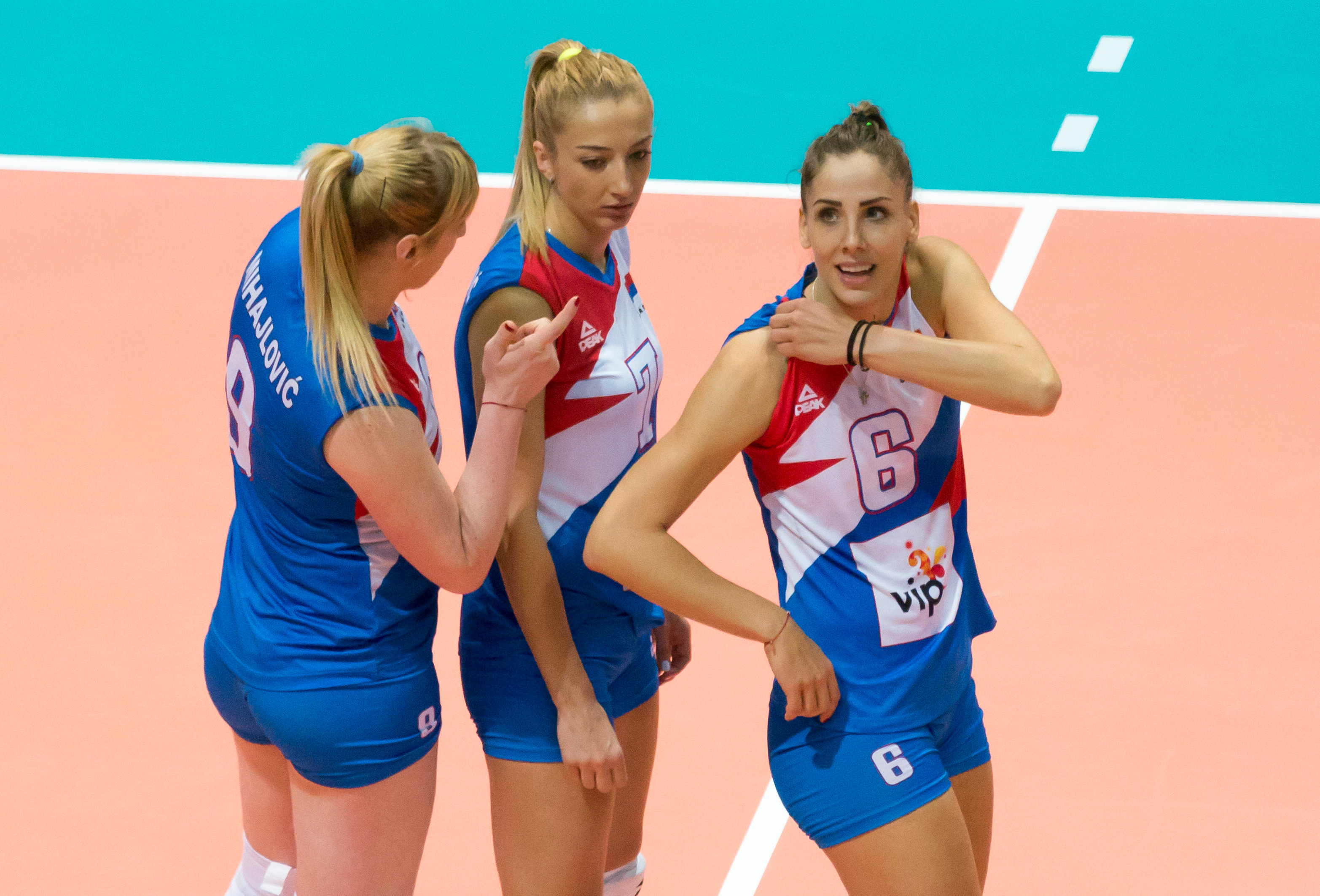
Brankica Mihajlović with Ana Antonijević and Tijana Malešević
