= Massimo Barbolini =

Italian volleyball coach (born 1964)

- Barbolini in 2025

Personal information
- Nationality: Italian
- Born: 29 August 1964 (age 62); Modena, Italy

Volleyball information
- Position: Head coach
- Current club: Italy (W) (AC)

Career
Years	Teams
1985–1989; 1989–1990; 1990–1992; 1992–1993; 1993–1996; 1996–1997; 1997–2007; 2006–2012; 2009–2010; 2012–2015; 2013–2015; 2015–2016; 2016–2017; 2017–2020; 2020–2024; 2024– 2025; 2025–2026	Panini Modena (AC); Sanyo Agrigento; Carimonte Modena; Marconi Volley; Matera; Canottieri Aniene; Sirio Perugia; Italy (W); Club Italia; Galatasaray (W); Turkey (W); Volleyball Casalmaggiore; Eczacıbaşı; AGIL Volley; Pallavolo Scandicci; Italy (W) (AC); LOVB Houston; Galatasaray (W)

Massimo Barbolini (born 29 August 1964) is an Italian volleyball coach. He is coach of Italy (W), and Galatasaray (W).

Coaching Italy women's national volleyball team, he has won the 2007 and 2009 Women's European Volleyball Championship.

== Career ==
Born in Modena, as a boy he played volleyball as setter but was forced to retired from volleyball due to a serious injury when he was 20 years old.

== Coaching career (club) ==
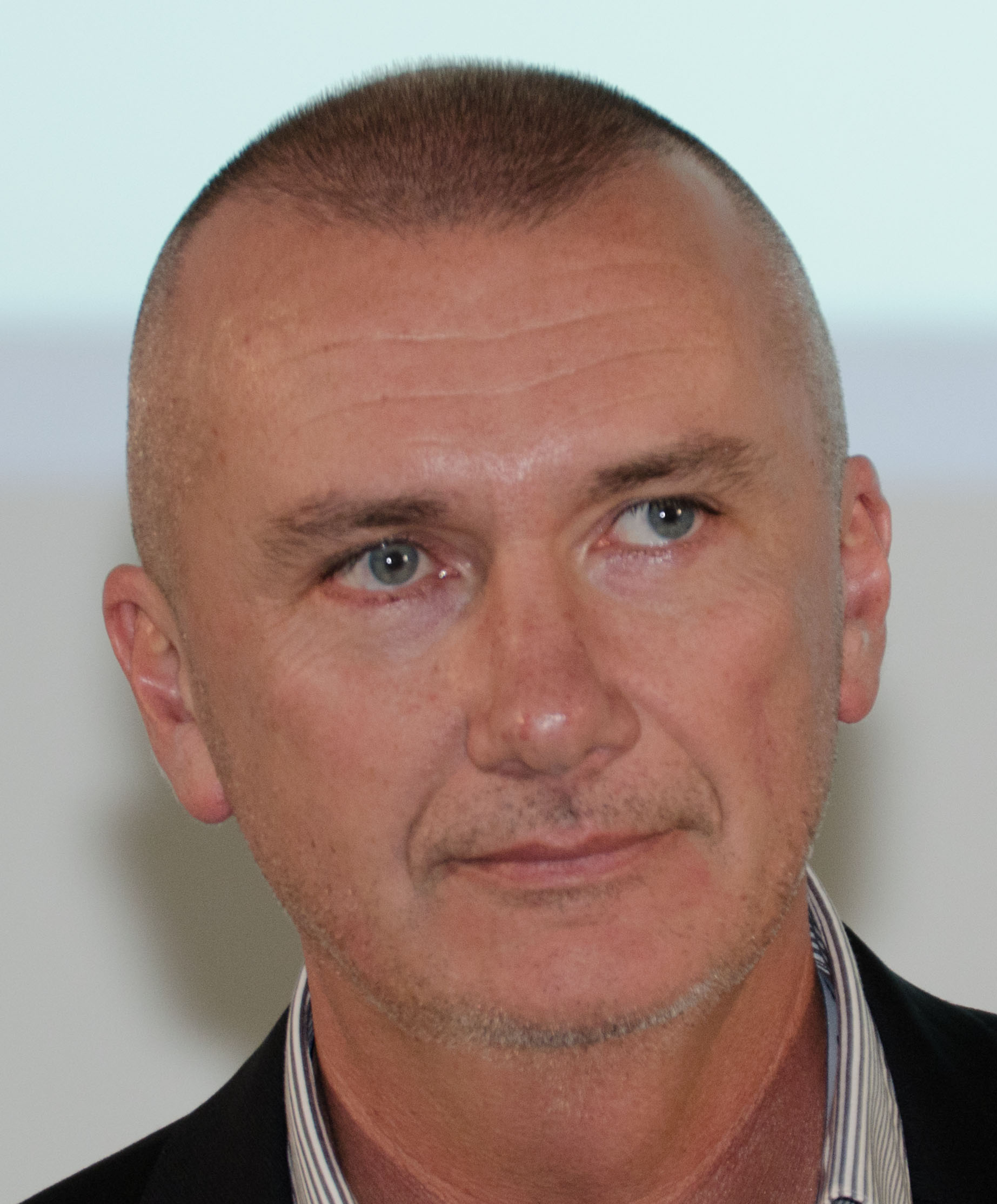
Barbolini in 2012

He soon become assistant coach of Julio Velasco at Panini Modena then in 1989 he was named coach of Sanyo Agrigento. With the Sicilian team he reached the Italian serie A1 (first division) then he trained Modena Volley.

In 1993 he was named coach of Latte Rugiada Matera, his first assignment in woman volleyball. With that team he won two Italian championship and two Italy Cup a European Supercup and a European Champions League.

After a year with Gierre Roma, he was named coach of Despar Sirio of Perugia. With the Deapar Sirio, which he trained from 1997/1998 to 2006/2007, he won 3 Italian championship (2003, 2005 and 2007), a European Champions League (2006) and a European Cup Winner's Cup, two CEV Cups, as well as 4 Italy Cup (1999, 2003, 2005, 2007).

=== Galatasaray ===
It was announced by the club that he became the Head Coach of Galatasaray (W) on 27 May 2025.

29 May 2025, signed a 2–year contract with Galatasaray.

On February 20, 2026, it was announced that Barbolini and the club had parted ways by mutual agreement.

Immediately after Barbolini's departure, 35-year-old assistant coach Alberto Bigarelli, who had limited previous head coaching experience, took over the team. Under Bigarelli's leadership, Galatasaray achieved the club's greatest European success to date by winning the CEV Volleyball Cup 2026 title, defeating Italy's Reale Mutua Fenera Chieri '76 3–1 in the final on 8 April 2026 in Istanbul.

== Coaching career (national team) ==
In the August 2006, after the firing of Marco Bonitta from Italy women's national volleyball team, Barbolini led the team in the World Championship to the 4th place.

In summer 2007 the Italy women's national volleyball team arrived third at Grand Prix and won its first European Championship. In November 2007 Barbolini's team also won the 2007 Volleyball World Cup. At 2008 summer olympics the Italian team managed by Barbolini was defeated by the USA at the quarter-final match.

In 2009 he led the Italian woman volleyball national team to the victory at European championship.

In 2011 he led the Italian national team to the victory of 2011 FIVB Women's Volleyball World Cup

== References and sources ==
- Despar Sirio website
- September 2007 Edition of monthly magazine Pallavolo Supervolley
