= İlayda Uçak =

(footballer, born 2002)

Personal information
- Born: İlayda Uçak; November 28, 2002 (age 23) Turkey
- Height: 1.88 m (6 ft 2 in)
- Weight: 73 kg (161 lb)
- Spike: 319 cm (126 in)
- Block: 294 cm (116 in)

Volleyball information
- Position: Middle-blocker
- Current club: Galatasaray
- Number: 28

Career
- Years: Team
- –2017: Arkas Spor
- 2017–2020: VakıfBank II
- 2020–2021: Sistem9 Yeşilyurt Spor Kulübü
- 2021–2022: PTT Spor Kulübü
- 2022–2023: Nilüfer Belediyespor
- 2023–2024: Aydın Büyükşehir Belediyespor
- 2024–2026: Göztepe SK
- 2026–: Galatasaray

National team
- Years: Team
- 2017: Turkey U18
- 2020: Turkey U20

İlayda Uçak (born November 28, 2002) is a Turkish professional volleyball player. She is 1.88 m (6 ft 2 in) tall at 73 kg (161 lb) and plays in the Middle-blocker position.

== Club career ==
On August 10, 2026, she signed with Galatasaray of the Turkish Sultanlar Ligi.
