= Vita Akimova =

(footballer, born 2002)

- Akimova in 2026

Personal information
- Full name: Vita Vladislavovna Akimova
- Born: Vita Akimova; July 16, 2002 (age 24) Noyabrsk, Russia
- Height: 1.97 m (6 ft 5 1/2 in)
- Weight: 81 kg (179 lb)
- Spike: 312 cm (123 in)
- Block: 301 cm (119 in)

Volleyball information
- Position: Opposite
- Current club: Galatasaray
- Number: 22

Career
- Years: Team
- 2018–2020: Dinamo-UOR U20
- 2017–2020: Dynamo-Academiya-RBM U20
- 2019–2021: Dinamo-Ak Bars
- 2021: Sparta Nizhny Novgorod
- 2021–2022: VK Dinamo-Metar
- 2022–2023: Volero Le Cannet
- 2023–2025: Igor Gorgonzola Novara
- 2025–2026: Vero Volley Milano
- 2026–: Galatasaray

National team
- Years: Team
- 2017: Russia U16
- 2018–2019: Russia U17
- 2019–2020: Russia U19
- 2021–: Russia U20

Vita Vladislavovna Akimova (born July 16, 2002) is a Russian professional volleyball player. She is 1.97 m (6 ft 5 1/2 in) tall at 81 kg (179 lb) and plays in the Opposite position.

== Club career ==
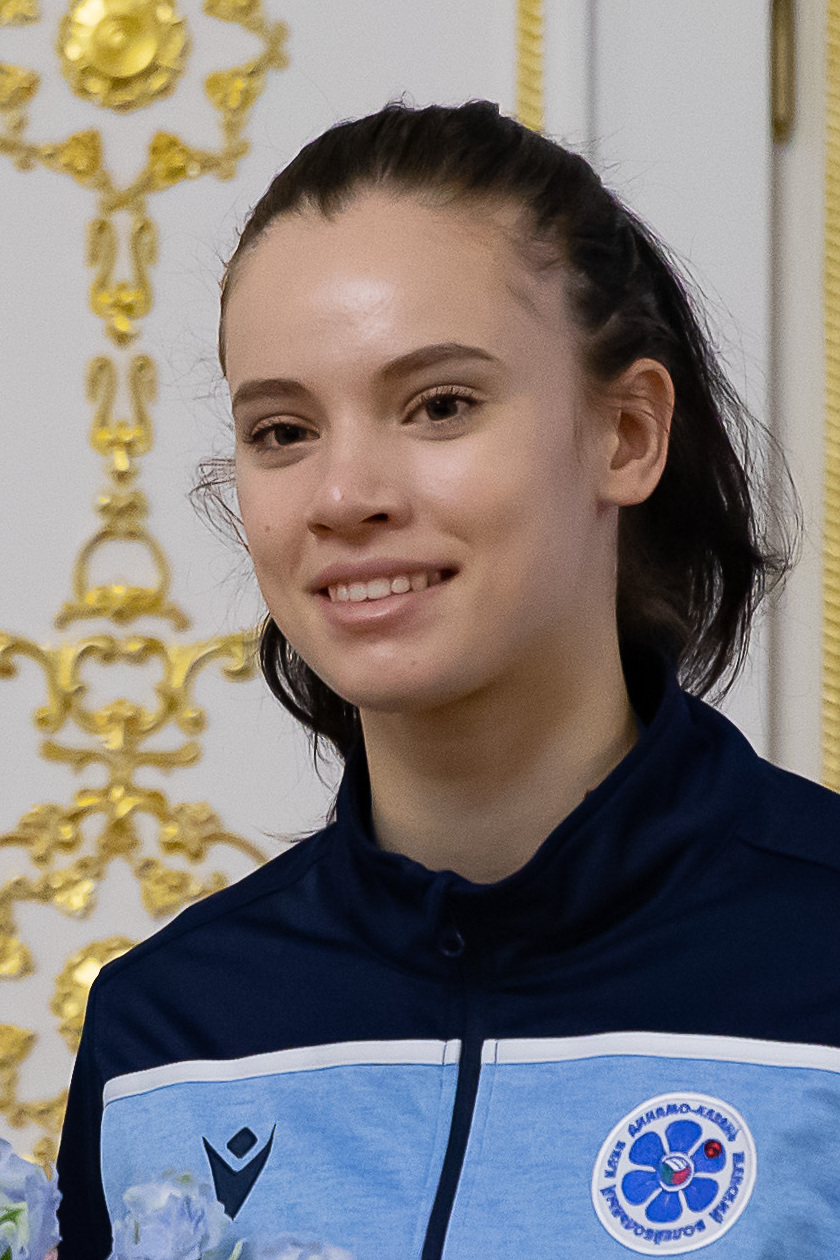

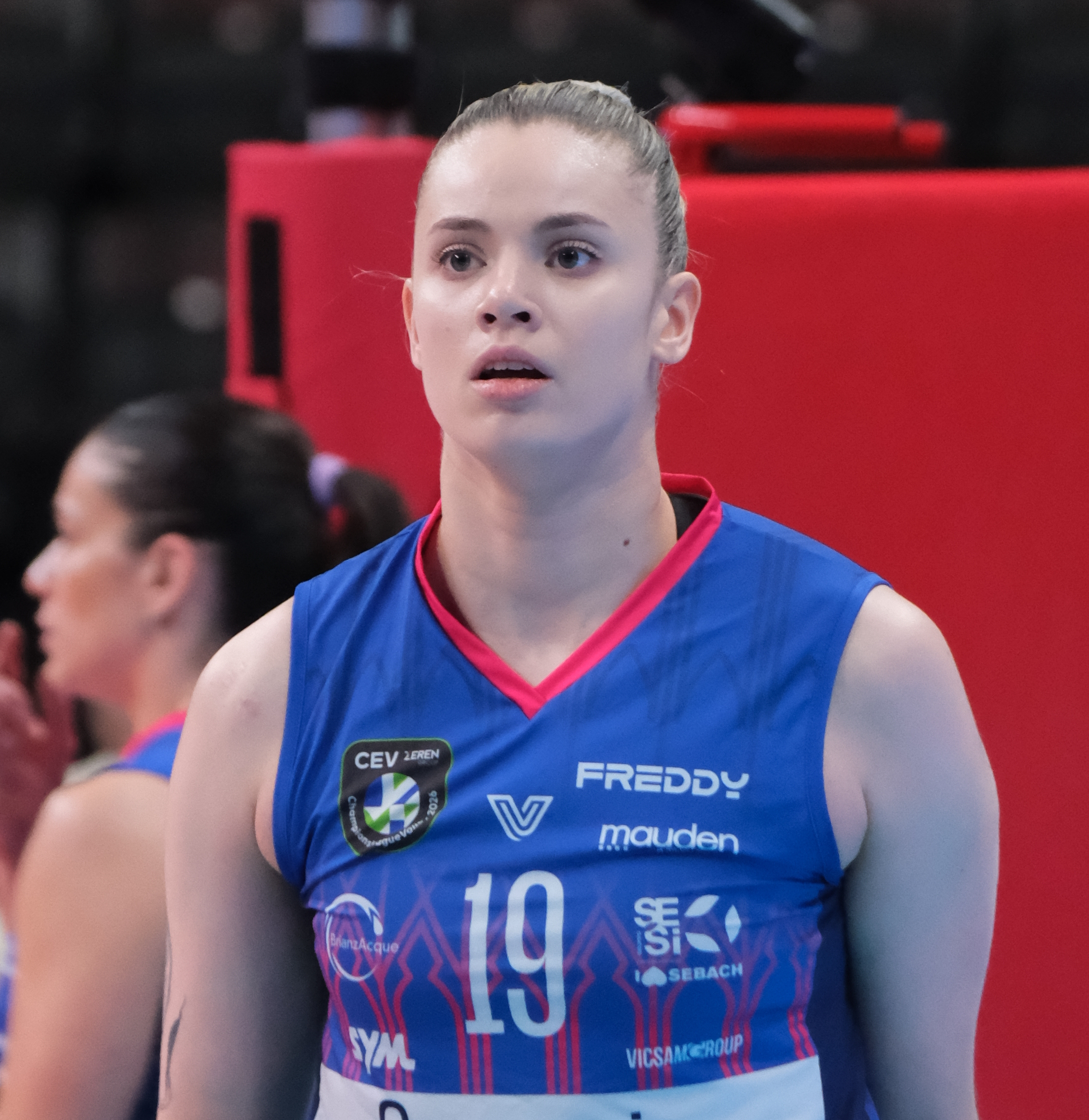
Akimova in 2026

On July 19, 2026, she signed with Galatasaray of the Turkish Sultanlar Ligi.
