= Ezgi Akın =

(footballer, born 2002)

- Akın of Galatasaray (2026)

Personal information
- Born: Ezgi Akın; December 19, 2007 (age 18) Turkey
- Height: 1.86 m (6 ft 1 in)
- Weight: 75 kg (165 lb)

Volleyball information
- Position: Middle-blocker
- Current club: Galatasaray
- Number: 35

Career
- Years: Team
- 2021–2024: Fenerbahçe U16
- 2024–: Galatasaray U18
- 2025–: Galatasaray ll
- 2026–: Galatasaray

National team
- Years: Team
- –: (Turkey)

Ezgi Akın (born December 19, 2007) is a Turkish professional volleyball player. She is 1.86 m (6 ft 1 in) tall at 75 kg (165 lb) and plays in the Middle-blocker position.

== Club career ==
On September 30, 2026, she signed a one-year contract with Galatasaray.
