= Eylül Karadaş =

(footballer, born 2001)

Personal information
- Born: Eylül Karadaş; September 3, 2001 (age 25); Turkey
- Height: 1.78 m (5 ft 10 in)
- Weight: 67 kg (148 lb)
- Spike: 280 cm (110 in)
- Block: 274 cm (108 in)

Volleyball information
- Position: Setter
- Current club: Galatasaray
- Number: 3

Career
Years	Teams
2015–2017	İlbank U16
2017–2022	İlbank
2022–2023	Karayolları SK
2023–2025	İlbank
2025–2026	Zeren SK
2026–	Galatasaray

National team
Turkey

Eylül Karadaş (born September 3, 2001) is a Turkish professional volleyball player. She is 1.78 m (5 ft 10 in) tall at 67 kg (148 lb) and plays in the Setter position.

== Club career ==
On July 28, 2026, she signed with Galatasaray of the Turkish Sultanlar Ligi.
