= Janset Cemre Erkul =

(footballer, born 1997)

Personal information
- Born: Janset Cemre Erkul; January 12, 1997 (age 29) Bursa, Turkey
- Height: 1.86 m (6 ft 1 in)
- Weight: 65 kg (143 lb)
- Spike: 305 cm (120 in)
- Block: 300 cm (120 in)

Volleyball information
- Position: Middle-blocker
- Current club: Galatasaray
- Number: 13

Career
- Years: Team
- 2013–2014: Eczacıbaşı U18
- 2014–2016: İlbank
- 2016–2017: Nilüfer Belediyespor
- 2017–2018: Çanakkale Belediyespor
- 2018–2019: Beşiktaş JK
- 2019–2020: PTT Spor Kulübü
- 2020–2021: Aydın Büyükşehir Belediyespor
- 2021–2022: Türk Hava Yolları
- 2022–2023: PTT Spor Kulübü
- 2023–2025: Kuzeyboru GSK
- 2025–2026: Zeren SK
- 2026–: Galatasaray

National team
- Years: Team
- Turkey

Janset Cemre Erkul (born January 12, 1997) is a Turkish professional volleyball player. She is 1.86 m (6 ft 1 in) tall at 65 kg (143 lb) and plays in the Middle-blocker position.

== Club career ==
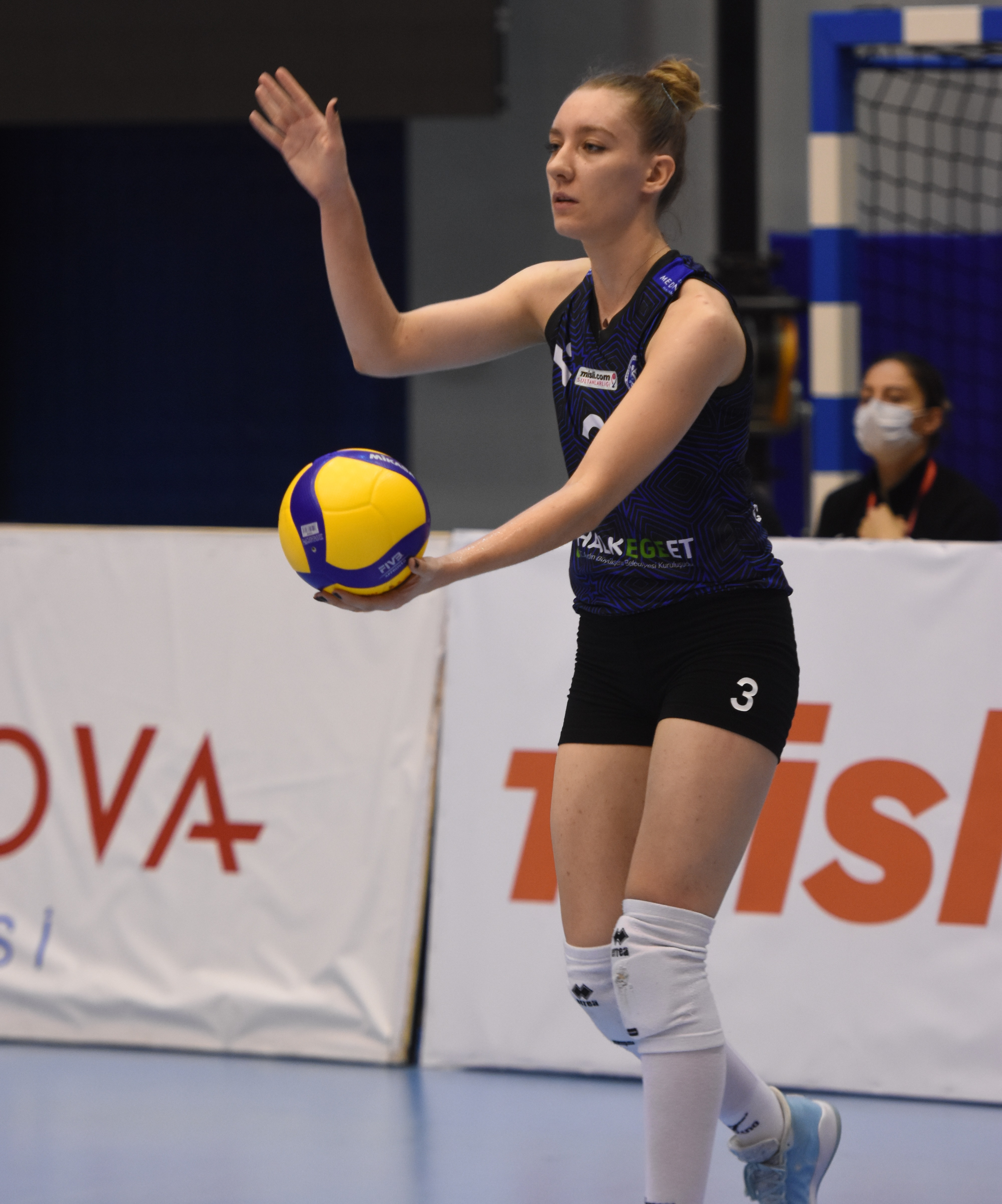

On July 21, 2026, she signed with Galatasaray of the Turkish Sultanlar Ligi.
