= Merve Tanyel =

(footballer, born 1996)

- Tanyel in 2026

Personal information
- Born: Merve Tanyel; February 6, 1996 (age 30) Istanbul, Turkey
- Height: 1.77 m (5 ft 9 1/2 in)
- Weight: 61 kg (134 lb)
- Spike: 300 cm (120 in)
- Block: 290 cm (110 in)

Volleyball information
- Position: Outside Hitter
- Current club: Galatasaray
- Number: 10

Career
- Years: Team
- 2008–2013: Fenerbahçe U18
- 2013–2014: VakıfBank U18
- 2014–2018: San Diego Toreros
- 2018–2019: Fenerbahçe Opet
- 2019–2020: Beylikdüzü Voleybol İhtisas
- 2020: Merinos SK
- 2020–2024: PTT Spor
- 2024–2025: Bahçelievler Belediyespor
- 2025–2026: İlbank
- 2026–: Galatasaray

National team
- Years: Team
- Turkey

Merve Tanyel (born February 6, 1996) is a Turkish professional volleyball player. She is 1.77 m (5 ft 9 1/2 in) tall at 61 kg (134 lb) and plays in the Outside Hitter position.

== Club career ==
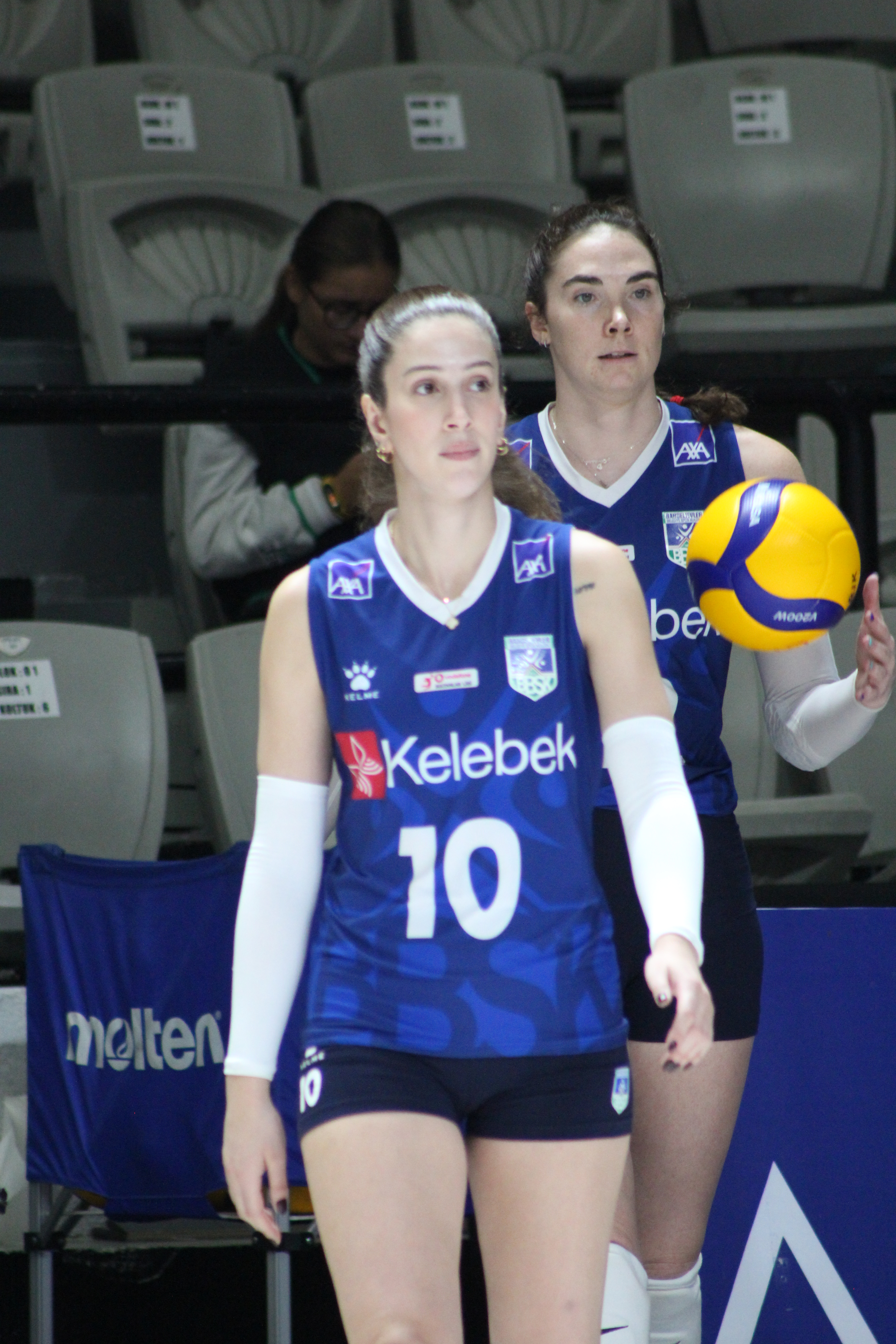
Tanyel in 2024

On August 12, 2026, she signed with Galatasaray of the Turkish Sultanlar Ligi.
