= Gizem Çerağ Düzeltir =

(footballer, born 1996)

Çerağ Düzeltir

Personal information
- Born: Gizem Çerağ Düzeltir; April 15, 1996 (age 30); Turkey
- Height: 1.70 m (5 ft 7 in)
- Weight: 67 kg (148 lb)
- Spike: 275 cm (108 in)
- Block: 220 cm (87 in)

Volleyball information
- Position: Libero
- Current club: Galatasaray
- Number: 1

Career
Years	Teams
2013–2014	MKE Ankaragücü
2014–2015	Rota Koleji SK
2015–2016	Samsun Büyükşehir Belediyesi
2016–2017	Samsun Anakent
2017–2018	Rota Koleji SK
2018–2019	Salihli Belediyespor
2019–2021	Sarıyer Belediyesi
2021	Mert Grup Sigorta
2021–2022	Muratpaşa Belediyespor
2022–2023	Bolu Belediyespor
2023–2026	Aydın Büyükşehir Belediyespor
2026–	Galatasaray

National team
Turkey

Gizem Çerağ Düzeltir (born April 15, 1996) is a Turkish professional volleyball player. She is 1.70 m (5 ft 7 in) tall at 67 kg (148 lb) and plays in the Libero position.

== Club career ==
On August 9, 2026, she signed with Galatasaray of the Turkish Sultanlar Ligi.
