= Galatasaray S.K. (women's volleyball) =

Turkish volleyball team

Galatasaray SK
- 2026–27 season
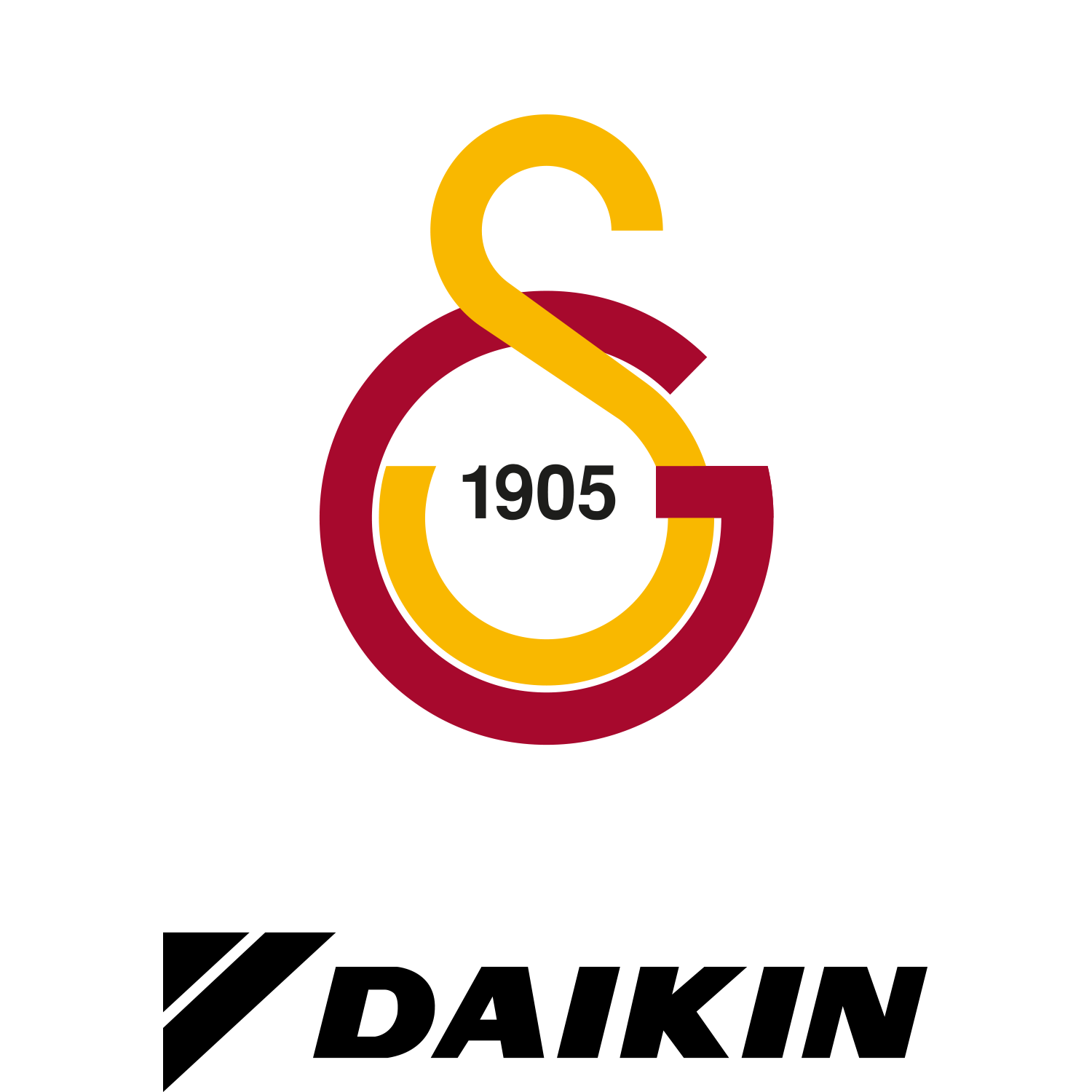
- Full name: Galatasaray
- Short name: Galatasaray
- Founded: 1922
- Ground: TVF Burhan Felek Sport Hall (Capacity: 7,000)
- Chairman: (Turkey) Dursun Özbek
- Manager: (Italy) Alberto Bigarelli
- Captain: (Turkey) İlkin Aydın
- League: Sultanlar Ligi
- 2025–26: Regular season: 5th Play-offs: 5th
- Website: Club home page
- Championships: 5 Turkish Championships (all pre-1984)

Galatasaray Daikin is the professional women's volleyball section of Galatasaray SK, a major sports club in Istanbul, Turkey. Galatasaray play their matches in the 7000-seat arena TVF Burhan Felek Sport Hall.

== Previous names ==
| Period | Previous names |
|---|---|
| 1922–2010 | Galatasaray |
| 2010–2011 | Galatasaray Medical Park |
| 2011–2012 | Galatasaray |
| 2012–2016 | Galatasaray Daikin |
| 2016–2019 | Galatasaray |
| 2019–2023 | Galatasaray HDI Sigorta |
| 2023–present | Galatasaray Daikin |

== History ==
=== Early history ===
Galatasaray's women's volleyball branch was established in 1922. The team won the Istanbul Women's Volleyball League seven times and the Turkish Women's Volleyball Championship five times. However, the team does not have a Sultans League championship.

=== 1980 era ===
As a result of Galatasaray (men's volleyball team) becoming the champion in the league in the 1986–1987 season, the volleyball branch managers of the period formed an ambitious team for the women's volleyball team and entered the 1987–1988 season. They finished second.

=== 2000 era ===
In the following years, with the establishment of more clubs, the team could not be as successful in volleyball as before. Due to the economic crisis, the team was closed for a year while they were in the Sultans League in the 2003–2004 season. However, after four seasons, this time three weeks before the end of the league, they were defeated by TED Ankara College 3-0 and relegated to the 1st league in the 2006-2007 season for the first time in their history and were promoted to the Sultans League again the following season. The women's volleyball team, which has had to compete in the 1st league twice, has become a team that plays for the championship in the league again and consistently participates in the European cups every year, as a result of the efforts of the administrations coming after this process to raise the branch.

The team, which came in 3rd place in the CEV Women's Challenge Cup in the 2009-2010 season, changed their name to Galatasaray Medical Park Women's Volleyball Team as a result of the name sponsorship made with Medical Park in the 2010-2011 season and continued their struggle in the league. However, the paths parted with Medical Park after one season. In the next season, the team that competed as the Galatasaray women's volleyball team played in the final with Italy's Unendo Yamamay Busto Arsizio team in the Women's CEV Cup for the first time in their history, and won the second place in the final by losing in the gold set. At the end of the same season, the team that participated in the CEV Women's Champions League by receiving a wild card, advanced to the next round as a result of the group matches they played, and were entitled to organize the final four in the CEV Women's Champions League.

=== 2010 era ===
Having signed a name sponsorship agreement with Daikin at the beginning of the 2012-2013 season, the team hosted the final four of the CEV Women's Champions League as Galatasaray DaikinwWomen's volleyball team, and finished the tournament in 4th place.

In the 2014–2015 season, Galatasaray Daikin women's volleyball team said goodbye to Europe by losing to their rival in the semi-finals of the Women's CEV Cup, then lost to VakıfBank 3-2 in the Turkish Super Cup and said goodbye to the cup in the semi-finals. In the league, the team finished the regular season in 4th place and matched with their rival Nilüfer Belediyespor in the quarter finals. By defeating their opponent 2-0 in the quarter-finals and finishing in 4th place in the play-off final stage, the team qualified to compete in the Women's CEV Cup next season.

Contrary to previous seasons, the team started the 2015–2016 season with an infrastructure-weighted squad, surprising all authorities, and continued on their way in the league and Europe with full reins, winning all 10 matches until the final match in the Women's CEV Cup and matched with the Russian representative Dinamo Krasnodar in the final. Having won the first match of the series 3-2 at home, the team lost the second match in Russia 3-0 and had to say goodbye for the second time in the last match of a final leg in this cup. In the league, the team that was among the top four teams completed the group in the last place and won the right to compete in the Women's CEV Cup for the next season.

Starting from the 2016–2017 season, the team parted ways with their sponsor, Daikin, and decided to continue their struggle as the Galatasaray women's volleyball team.

Completing the league in 4th place in the 2016-2017 season, the team lost to their arch-rival Fenerbahçe in the play-off series. They completed the play-offs in 2nd place and earned the right to compete in the CEV Women's Champions League for the next season. They said goodbye to the cup after losing 3-2 to Bursa Büyükşehir Belediyesi in the Turkish Women's Volleyball Cup. In the Women's CEV Cup, they lost to Dynamo Kazan in the semi-finals by 3-0 in both matches and said goodbye to the tournament.

Finishing the league in 3rd place in the regular season in the 2017-2018 season, the team finished the play-offs in 4th place. In the Cup, they lost 3-1 to Eczacıbaşı VitrA in the semi-finals and said goodbye to the organization. In the CEV Women's Champions League, the team reached the final four and finished the season in the last place in the finals of four.

In the 2018-2019 season, the team, which finished the league and play-offs in 4th place, said goodbye to the cup and also to the semi-finals. In Europe, they finished the season by saying goodbye to the Women's CEV Cup with the golden set in the quarter-finals.

Before the 2019-2020 season, the team agreed with HDI Sigorta to be the name sponsor and started the season as Galatasaray HDI Sigorta Women's Volleyball Team. Galatasaray HDI Sigorta women's volleyball team finished the league in 4th place in the regular season in 2019–2020. However, after the decision by Turkish Volleyball Federation on May 11, 2020 due to the COVID-19 pandemic, the league, whose play-off stage was not played, was registered with this ranking, and the champion or the relegated team was not determined in the season. Cup Volley to be played due to the pandemic has also been canceled for the 2019-2020 season. In Europe, the team that competed in the Women's CEV Cup said goodbye to the cup in the last 16 rounds before the pandemic.

=== 2020 era ===
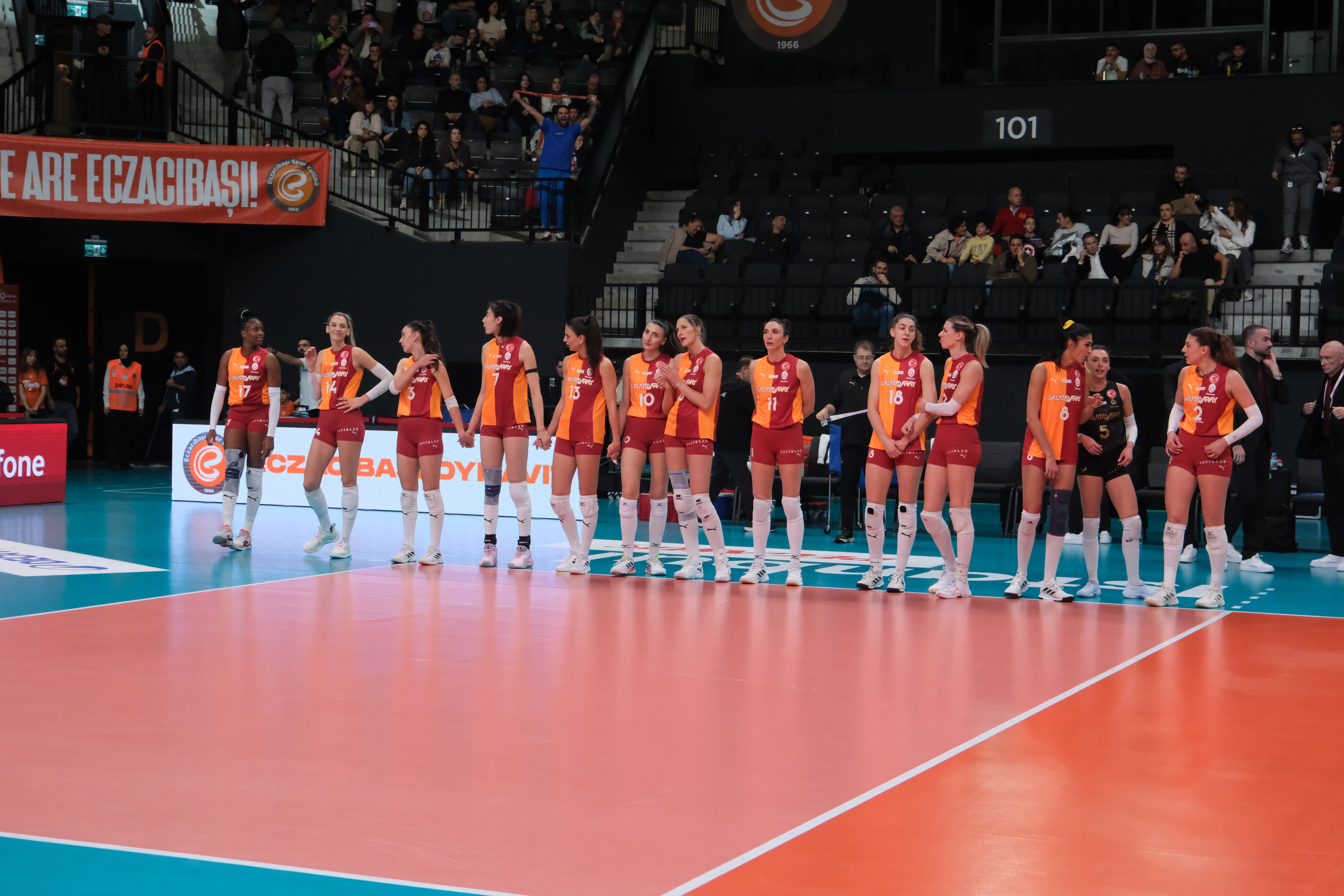
Galatasaray team (December 2025)

In the 2020-2021 season, they completed the Sultans League in 6th place at the end of the regular season matches, and as a result of the 5th & 8th play-off matches they played, they completed the season in 7th place and could not participate in the European Cups after many years. As a result of the Cup Volley matches they played, they lost to her opponent VakıfBank 3-0 in the semi-finals and said goodbye to the cup. They achieved her greatest success in the season by playing the final of the Women's CEV Cup for the third time in their history, however, as in the previous finals, they lost to their rival Saugella Monza, lost the cup as a result of a final, and came 2nd. Galatasaray Daikin defeated Reale Mutua Fenera Chieri '76 in both matches and became the 2025–2026 CEV Cup Champion.

== Honours ==
=== European competitions ===
- CEV Cup
  - Winners (1): 2025–26
  - Runners-up (3): 2011–12, 2015–16, 2020–21
- CEV Challenge Cup
  - Third place (2): 1996–97, 2009–10

=== Domestic competitions ===
- Turkish Women's Volleyball League
  - Runners-up (1): 2016–17
  - Third place (3): 2014–15, 2015–16, 2017–18
- Turkish Women's Volleyball Championship (defunct)
  - Winners (5): 1961, 1962, 1963, 1964, 1966
  - Runners-up (7): 1959, 1960, 1967, 1974, 1976, 1977, 1978
  - Third place (5): 1958, 1965, 1969, 1975, 1979
- Turkish Cup
  - Runners-up (1): 2011–12
  - Third place (1): 2012–13
- Turkish Super Cup
  - Runners-up (1): 2011–12

=== Regional competitions ===
- Istanbul League (defunct)
  - Winners (7): 1959–60, 1961–62, 1962–63, 1963–64, 1964–65, 1965–66, 1977–78
  - Runners-up (9): 1956–57, 1957–58, 1958–59, 1960–61, 1966–67, 1967–68, 1968–69, 1975–76, 1976–77
  - Third place (9): 1969–70, 1970–71, 1971–72, 1972–73, 1973–74, 1974–75, 1978–79, 1979–80, 1980–81

== Technical staff ==
As of 31 August 2026

| Name | Job |
|---|---|
| (Turkey) Neslihan Turan | Administrative Manager of Volleyball Teams |
| (Turkey) Mustafa Yurdaer Kobal | Assistant Administrative Manager |
| (Turkey) Gizem Giraygil Varol | Women's Volleyball Team Manager |
| (Italy) Alberto Bigarelli | Head Coach |
| (Turkey) Emre Türkileri | Assistant Coach |
| (Turkey) Canberk Tekmen | Assistant Coach |
| (Greece) Ioannis Paraschidis | Assistant Coach / Conditioner |
| (Turkey) Egemen Ekmen | Assistant Coach |
| (Turkey) Ahmet Akgümüş | Statistics Coach |
| (Turkey) Dinçer Kaya | Physiotherapist |
| (Spain) Marta Gutiérrez Pérez | Physiotherapist |
| (Turkey) Murat Beder | Masseur |
| (Turkey) Özkan Arslan | Outfitter |

== Team roster ==
As of 30 September 2026

| No. | Player | Position | Date of Birth | Height (m) | Country |
|---|---|---|---|---|---|
| 1 | Gizem Çerağ Düzeltir | Libero | 15 April 1996 (age 30) | 1.70 | Turkey |
| 2 | İlkin Aydın (c) | Outside Hitter | 5 January 2000 (age 26) | 1.83 | Turkey |
| 3 | Eylül Karadaş | Setter | 3 September 2001 (age 25) | 1.78 | Turkey |
| 4 | Ege Melisa Bükmen | Outside Hitter | 24 February 2004 (age 22) | 1.81 | Turkey |
| 5 | Ayça Aykaç | Libero | 27 February 1996 (age 30) | 1.75 | Turkey |
| 7 | Wang Yuanyuan | Middle-blocker | 14 July 1997 (age 29) | 1.96 | China |
| 8 | Yasemin Güveli | Middle-blocker | 5 January 1999 (age 27) | 1.90 | Turkey |
| 10 | Merve Tanyel | Outside Hitter | 6 February 1996 (age 30) | 1.77 | Turkey |
| 12 | Britt Bongaerts | Setter | 3 November 1996 (age 29) | 1.85 | Netherlands |
| 13 | Janset Cemre Erkul | Middle-blocker | 12 January 1997 (age 29) | 1.86 | Turkey |
| 14 | Alexia Căruțașu | Opposite | 10 June 2003 (age 23) | 1.88 | Romania / Turkey |
| 17 | Myriam Sylla | Outside Hitter | 8 January 1995 (age 31) | 1.84 | Italy |
| 22 | Vita Akimova | Opposite | 16 July 2002 (age 24) | 1.97 | Russia |
| 28 | İlayda Uçak | Middle-blocker | 28 November 2002 (age 23) | 1.88 | Turkey |
| 35 | Ezgi Akın | Middle-blocker | 19 December 2007 (age 18) | 1.86 | Turkey |

== Season by season ==
| Season | League | Pos. | Turkish Cup | Turkish Super Cup | European competitions | | Worldwide competitions | |
|---|---|---|---|---|---|---|---|---|
| 2012–13 | TWVL | 3rd | 3rd | RU | CEV Champions League | 4th | Top Volley International | 3rd |
| 2013–14 | TWVL | 4th | Semi finals | Not qualified | CEV Champions League | 8th | | |
| 2014–15 | TWVL | 4th | Semi finals | Not qualified | CEV Cup | SF | Top Volley International | 4th |
| 2015–16 | TWVL | 4th | Not held | Not qualified | CEV Cup | RU | Not qualified | |
| 2016–17 | TWVL | 2nd | Quarter finals | Not held | CEV Cup | SF | Not qualified | |
| 2017–18 | TWVL | 4th | Semi finals | Not qualified | CEV Champions League | 4th | Not qualified | |
| 2018–19 | TWVL | 4th | Semi finals | Not qualified | CEV Cup | QF | Not qualified | |
| 2019–20 | cancelled due to COVID-19 pandemic | | | | CEV Cup | | Not qualified | |
| 2020–21 | TWVL | 7th | Semi finals | Not qualified | CEV Cup | RU | Not qualified | |
| 2021–22 | TWVL | 5th | Quarter finals | Not qualified | | | Not qualified | |
| 2022–23 | TWVL | 6th | Quarter finals | Not qualified | CEV Cup | 16th finals | Not qualified | |
| 2023–24 | TWVL | 6th | Group stage | Not qualified | CEV Challenge Cup | 8th finals | Not qualified | |
| 2024–25 | TWVL | 4th | Quarter finals | Not qualified | CEV Challenge Cup | SF | Not qualified | |
| 2025–26 | TWVL | | | | | | | |

== Notable players ==
Criteria

To appear in this section a player must have either:

- Played at least one season for the club.
- Set a club record or won an individual award while at the club.
- Played at least one official international match for their national team at any time.
- To perform very successfully during period in the club or at later/previous stages of his career.

Belgium

- Charlotte Leys

Brazil

- Elizabeth Hintemann
- Erika Coimbra
- Valeska Menezes

Bulgaria

- Dobriana Rabadžieva
- Emiliya Pachova
- Hristina Ruseva
- Penka Natova

Canada

- Stacey Gordon

China

- Hu Wen Yue

Croatia

- Marina Miletić
- Vesna Jelic

Cuba

- Rosir Calderón

Greece

- Anthí Vasilantonáki

Italy

- Caterina Bosetti
- Eleonora Lo Bianco
- Nadia Centoni
- Simona Gioli

Japan

- Saori Kimura
- Yuko Sano

Peru

- Patricia Soto

Puerto Rico

- Karina Ocasio

Russia

- Irina Ilchenko
- Marina Pankova
- Tatiana Kosheleva

Serbia

- Brižitka Molnar
- Ivana Đerisilo
- Nataša Krsmanović
- Slađana Erić

Sweden

- Malin Ericsson

Turkey

- Ayça Naz İhtiyaroğlu
- Aslı Kalaç
- Bihter Dumanoğlu
- Cansu Çetin
- Deniz Hakyemez
- İdil Naz Başcan
- Dilara Bilge
- Derya Çayırgan
- Ebru Elhan
- Elif Ağca
- Ezgi Güç
- Gizem Güreşen
- Güldeniz Önal
- Gamze Alikaya
- Hande Baladın
- Hazal Selin Arifoğlu
- Meryem Boz
- Merve Dalbeler
- Zeynep Sude Demirel
- Sude Hacımustafaoğlu
- Natalia Hanikoğlu
- Neriman Özsoy
- Neslihan Keskin
- Nilay Karaağaç
- Nilay Konar
- Nihan Güneyligil
- Neslihan Demir
- Özlem Özçelik
- Bahanur Şahin Gökalp
- Özgenur Yurtdagülen
- Seray Altay
- Su Zent
- Selime İlyasoğlu
- Sinem Barut

Ukraine

- Olga Petrashko
- Olesia Rykhliuk
- Youlia Kovtun

United States

- Cursty Jackson
- Ogonna Nnamani
- Ruth Burdine
- Sherridan Atkinson

Players written in italic still play for the club.

== Former coaches ==
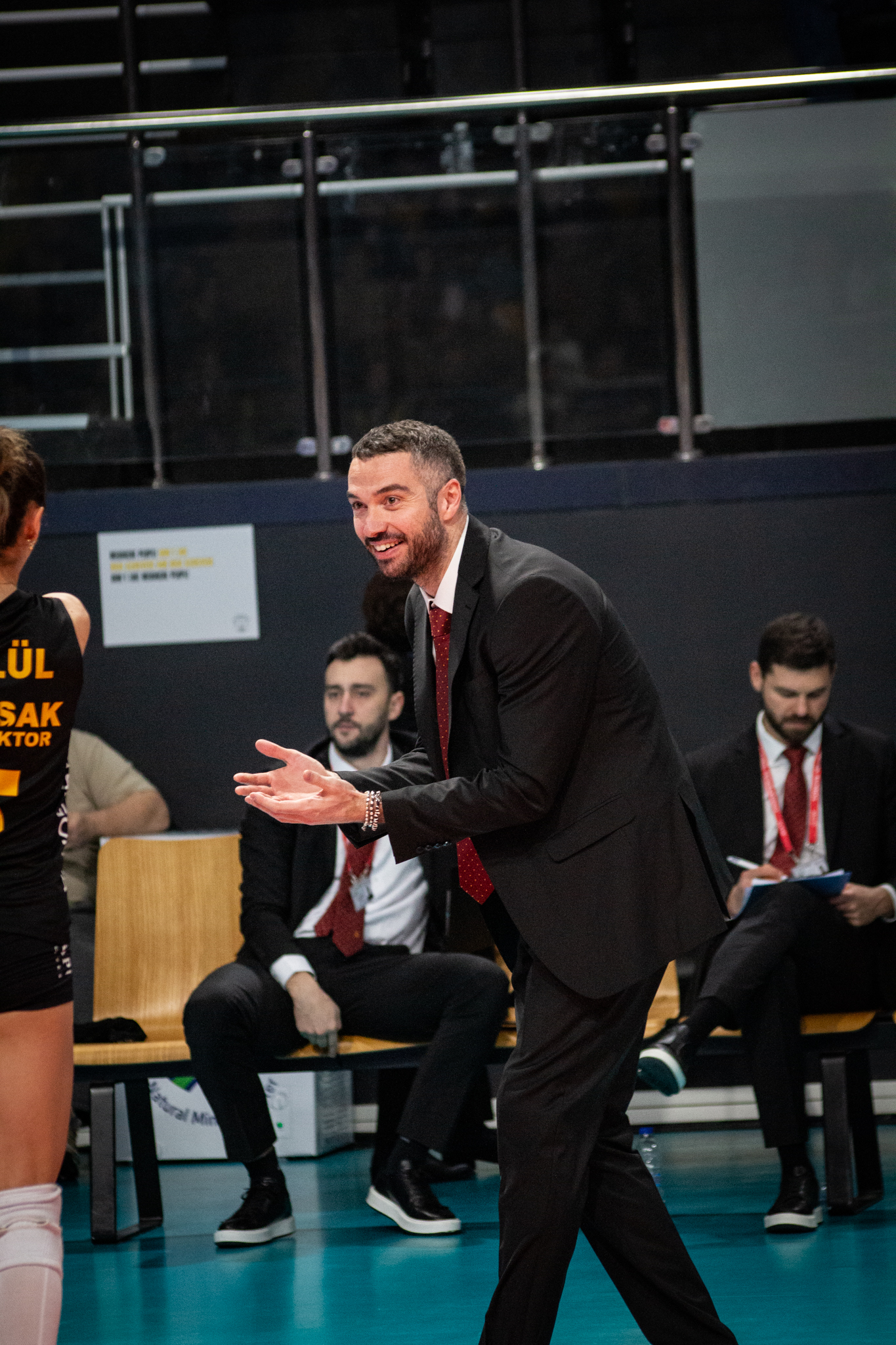
Alberto Bigarelli, the current coach

| Dates | Name |
|---|---|
| 1958–1967 | (Turkey) Oral Yılmaz |
| 1989–1993 | (Turkey) Mehmet Bedestenlioğlu |
| 1993–1996 | (Turkey) Cengiz Göllü |
| 1996–1999 | (Turkey) Mehmet Bedestenlioğlu |
| 1999–2000 | (Cuba) Eugenio George Lafita |
| 2000–2002 | (Turkey) Gökhan Edman |
| 2004–2007 | (Turkey) Gökhan Rahman Çokşen |
| 2007–2008 | (Turkey) Ahmet Reşat Arığ |
| 2008 | (Turkey) Mehmet Bedestenlioğlu |
| 2008–2011 | (Turkey) Gökhan Edman |
| 2011–2012 | (Serbia) Dragan Nešić |
| 2012–2015 | (Italy) Massimo Barbolini |
| 2015–2023 | (Turkey) Ataman Güneyligil |
| 2023–2024 | (Spain) Guillermo Naranjo Hernández |
| 2024–2025 | (Italy) Alberto Bigarelli |
| 2025–2026 | (Italy) Massimo Barbolini |
| 2026–present | (Italy) Alberto Bigarelli |

== Team captains ==
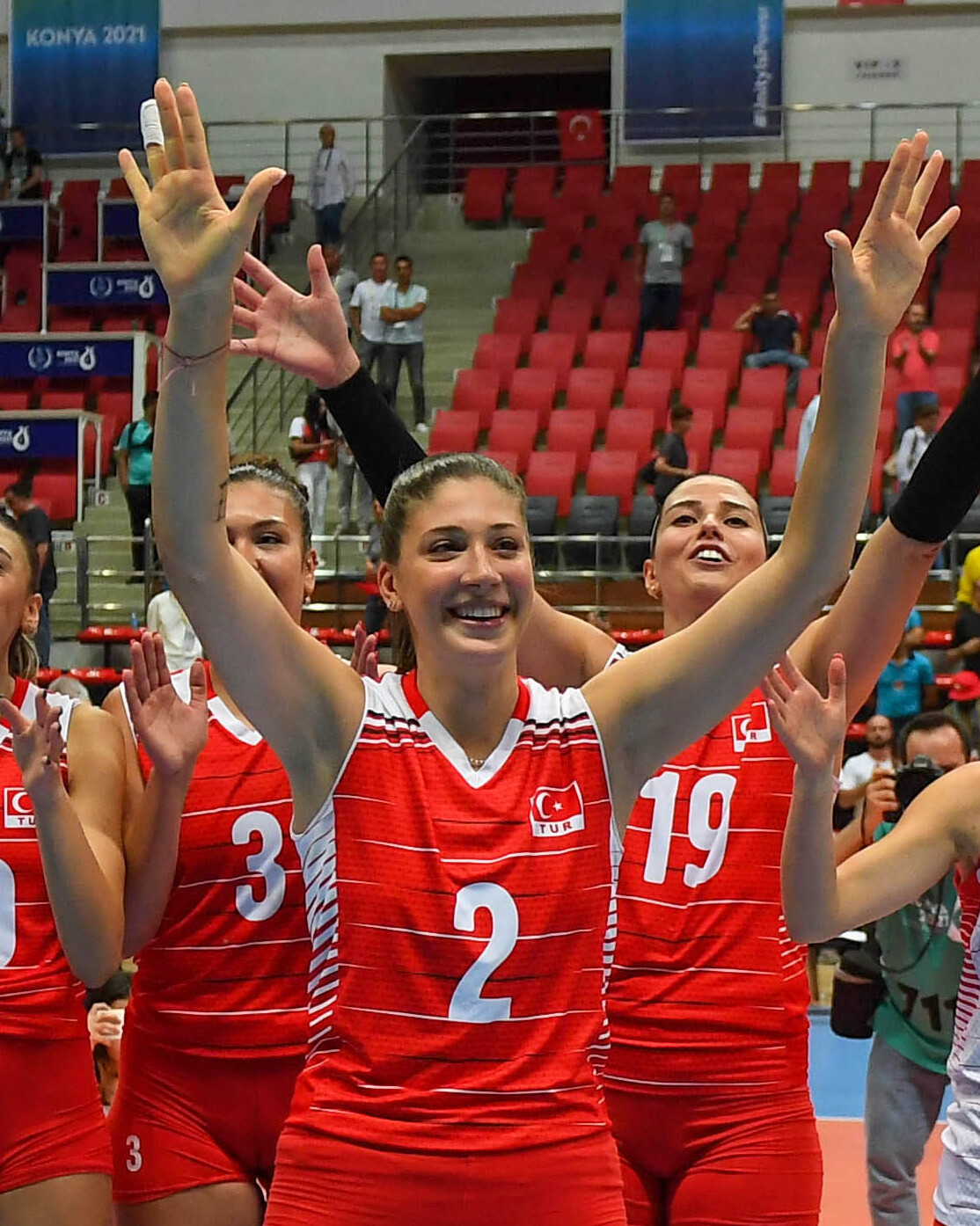
İlkin Aydın, the current captain

| Dates | Name |
|---|---|
| 2020–2023 | (Turkey) Gizem Güreşen |
| 2023 | (Turkey) Gamze Alikaya |
| 2023–2024 | (Turkey) Bihter Dumanoğlu |
| 2024–present | (Turkey) İlkin Aydın |

== Home halls ==
This is a list of the home halls where the senior team played in the recent years.

| # | Hall | Period |
|---|---|---|
| 1 | TVF Burhan Felek Sport Hall | 1985–present |

== See also ==
- Galatasaray S.K. (men's volleyball)
- Turkey women's national volleyball team
