= Britt Bongaerts =

Dutch female volleyball player

- Bongaerts in 2025

Personal information
- Nationality: Dutch
- Born: 3 November 1996 (age 29); Roermond, Netherlands
- Height: 1.85 m (6 ft 1 in)
- Weight: 68 kg (150 lb)
- Spike: 296 cm (117 in)
- Block: 284 cm (112 in)

Volleyball information
- Current club: Galatasaray
- Number: 12

Career
Years	Teams
2013–2014	Talent Team Papendal
2014–2015	Team Eurosped
2015–2016	Ladies in Black Aachen
2016–2017	USC Münster
2017–2018	Ladies in Black Aachen
2018–2020	SSC Palmberg Schwerin
2020–2021	ŁKS Commercecon Łódź
2021–2022	Bartoccini Fortinfissi Perugia
2022–2024	Allianz MTV Stuttgart
2024–	Galatasaray

National team
2016–	Netherlands
Honours
European Championship
Bronze medal – third place	2023 Belgium/Estonia/Germany/Italy

Britt Bongaerts (born 3 November 1996) is a Dutch volleyball player.

== Club career ==
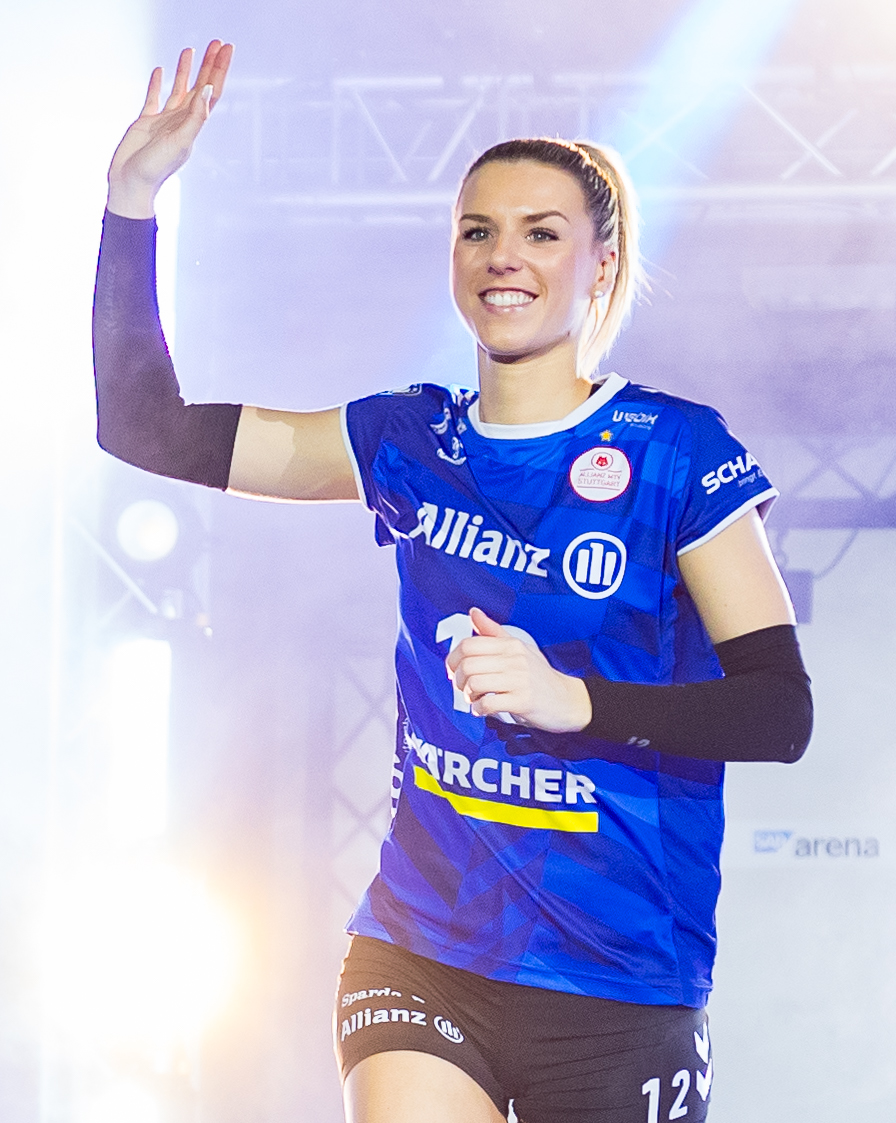
Bongaerts in 2024

On club level she played for Eurosped TVT in 2014.

=== Galatasaray ===
On 19 June 2024, Galatasaray signed a 1+1-year deal with Dutch setter Bongaerts.

== International career ==
Bongaerts is part of the Netherlands women's national volleyball team.

She competed in the 2014 FIVB Volleyball World Grand Prix and the 2024 Summer Olympics.

== Honours ==
=== Clubs ===
- 2024–25 BVA Cup Champion, with Galatasaray
- 2025–26 CEV Cup Champion, with Galatasaray
