= Zeren SK =

Turkish women's volleyball club

Zeren Spor Kulübü
- Founded: 2022; 4 years ago
- Ground: Başkent Volleyball Hall, Ankara (Capacity: 7,600-8,000)
- Chairman: Mustafa Yiğit Zeren
- Head coach: (Serbia) Stevan Ljubičić
- Captain: Şeyma Ercan
- League: Sultanlar League
- 2024–25: 5th
- Website: zerensk.com

Uniforms
Home	Away

Zeren SK (Turkish: Zeren Spor Kulübü) is a Turkish professional women's volleyball club based in Ankara that plays in the top-level Sultanlar League.

== History ==
Zeren SK was founded as a women's volleyball club by businessman Mustafa Yiğit Zeren, who acts as the club chairman, in Ankara, Turkey in 2022. It is suppoted by the Zeren Investment Inc. The club colors are purple and white.

In the 2025–26 season the team play under the Serbian head coach Stevan Ljubičić, in the top-level Sultanlar League. They were included into the 2025–26 CEV Women's Champions League, which was sponsored by the Zeren Group of Companies, with a wild card as the fourth Turkish club. The team played in the Pool D.

The Zeren 2 team play in the second-tier Turkish Women's Volleyball First League.

== Arena ==
Zeren play their home matches at Başkent Volleyball Hall, and Zeren 2 at Selim Sırrı Tarcan Sport Hall .

== Current squad ==
2025-26 season:

Head coach: (Serbia) Stevan Ljubičić.

No.	Pos.	Player	Date of birth and age	Height (m)
2	L	(Turkey) Özlem Güven	1 October 1997 (age 28)	1.65
3	S	(Turkey) Eylül Karadaş	3 September 2001 (age 25)	1.78
5	OH	(Turkey) Şeyma Ercan	5 July 1994 (age 32)	1.87
7	OP	(Russia) Anna Lazareva	31 January 1997 (age 29)	1.90
8	MB	(Serbia) Maja Aleksić	6 June 1997 (age 29)	1.88
9	OP	(Serbia) Brankica Mihajlović	13 April 1991 (age 35)	1.90
10	MB	(Turkey) Beyza Arıcı	27 July 1995 (age 31)	1.92
12	S	(Russia) Svetlana Gatina	21 May 2003 (age 23)	1.90
13	MB	(Turkey) Janset Cemre Erkul	12 January 1997 (age 29)	1.86
14	L	(Turkey) Ceren Önal	3 February 1991 (age 35)	1.71
15	OH	(Serbia) Aleksandra Uzelac	27 July 2004 (age 22)	1.88
16	OH	(Turkey) Saliha Şahin	5 November 1998 (age 27)	1.86
23	S	(Italy) Ofelia Malinov	29 February 1996 (age 30)	1.84

== Former notable players ==
Serbia

- Brankica Mihajlović

Turkey

- Kübra Akman
- İdil Naz Başcan
- Fatma Beyaz
- Yeter Yalçın
- Beren Yeşilırmak
