= Wang Yuanyuan (volleyball) =

Chinese volleyball player she plays for Galatasaray, one of the Sultans League teams

Personal information
- Nationality: Chinese
- Born: 14 July 1997 (age 29)
- Height: 1.96 m (6 ft 5 in)
- Weight: 75 kg (165 lb)
- Spike: 323 cm (127 in)
- Block: 312 cm (123 in)

Volleyball information
- Position: Middle-blocker
- Current club: (Turkey) Galatasaray
- Number: 7

Career
Years	Teams
2009–2015	(China) Tianjin Bohai Bank (Youth)
2015–2025	(China) Tianjin Bohai Bank
2025–present	(Turkey) Galatasaray

National team
2016–present	China
Honours
Women's volleyball
Representing China
FIVB World Cup
Gold medal – first place	2019 Japan	Team
FIVB Nations League
Silver medal – second place	2023 Arlington	Team
Bronze medal – third place	2019 Nanjing	Team
Asian Games
Gold medal – first place	2022 Hangzhou	Team
AVC Continental Championship
Silver medal – second place	2026 Tianjin	Team
AVC Cup
Gold medal – first place	2016 Vinh Phuc	Team

Wang Yuanyuan (born 14 July 1997) is a Chinese volleyball player. On club level, she plays for Galatasaray.

== Club career ==
On November 22, 2025, she signed with Galatasaray of the Turkish Sultanlar Ligi.

On August 1, 2026, she signed a new one-year contract with Galatasaray.

== International career ==
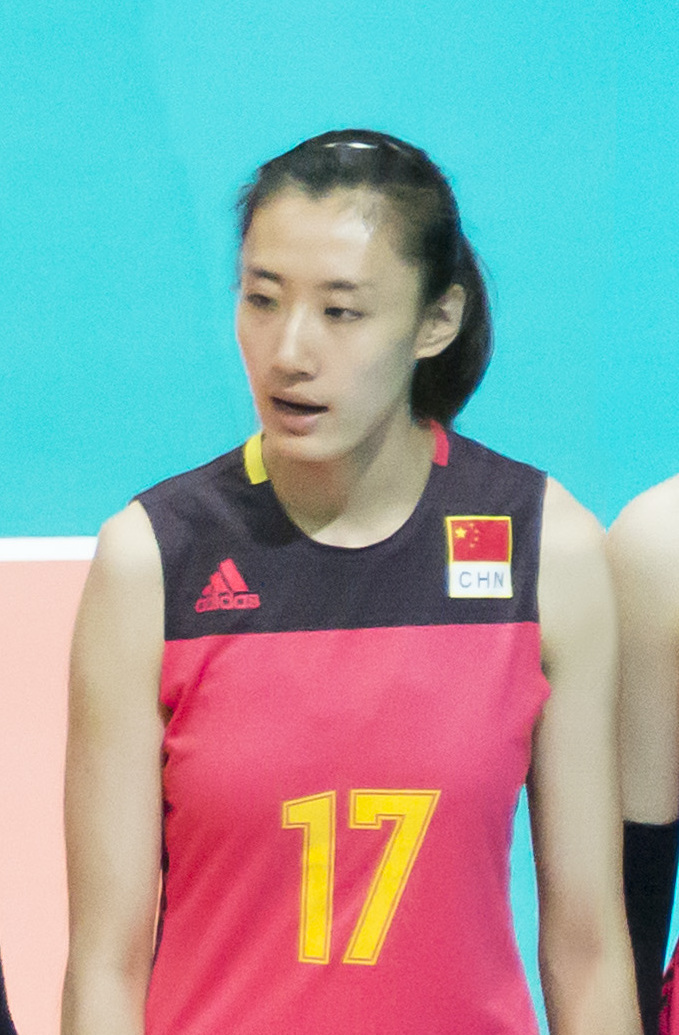

She represented China at the 2020 and 2024 Summer Olympics.

== Awards ==
=== Individuals ===
- 2026 AVC Continental Championship – "Best Middle Blocker"

=== Clubs ===
- 2025–26 CEV Cup Champion, with Galatasaray
