= Alberto Bigarelli =

Italian volleyball coach (born 1990)

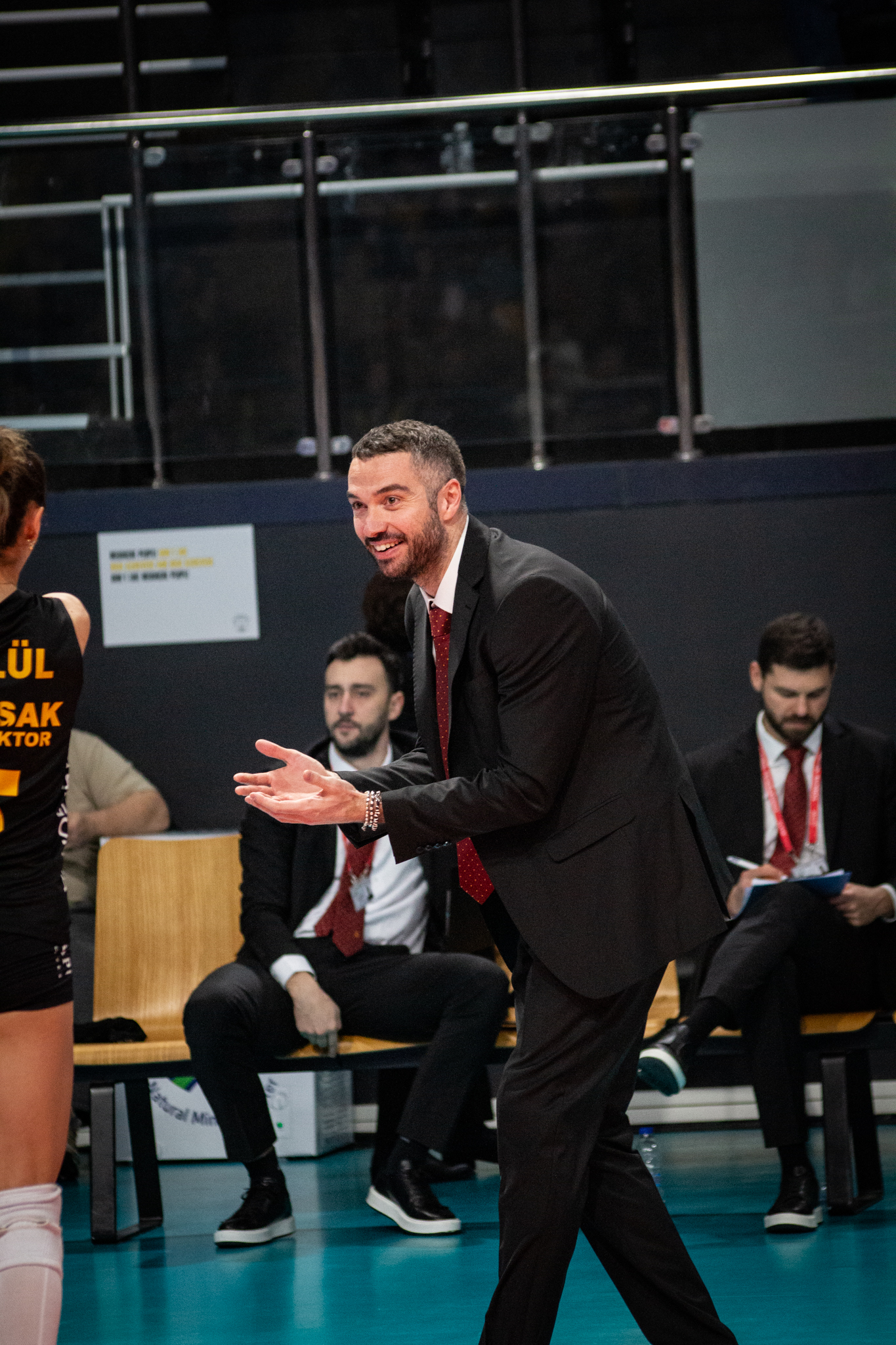

Personal information
- Full name: Alberto Bigarelli
- Born: 5 June 1990 (age 36); Italy
- Height: 1.92 m (6 ft 4 in)

Coaching information
- Current team: Galatasaray
Previous teams coached
Years	Teams
2022–2023; 2023; 2023–2024; 2024; 2024–2025; 2025–2026; 2026–	Reale Mutua Fenera Chieri (AC); Volley Bergamo 1991 (AC); Volley Bergamo 1991; CSM București; Galatasaray; Galatasaray (AC); Galatasaray

Volleyball information
- Position: Outside Hitter

Career
Years	Teams
2011–2012; 2012–2013; 2013–2014; 2014–2015; 2016–2017; 2017–2019; 2019–2020	Edilesse Conad Reggio Emilia; Reima Crema; Correggio Volley; CIS Reti TLC Hydra Latina; Borghi Castelfranco Emilia; Gabbiano Top Team Mantova; MoMa Anderlini Modena

Alberto Bigarelli (born 5 June 1990) is an Italian volleyball coach.

== Career ==
Bigarelli started his professional career as a volleyball player. Playing as a spiker, Bigarelli stood out with his discipline and technical skills in the game. After ending his playing career, he continued her journey in the volleyball world by joining the technical teams.

== Coaching career ==
After his playing career, Bigarelli worked as an assistant coach at prestigious clubs in Italy such as Reale Mutua Fenera Chieri '76 and Volley Bergamo 1991. In the 2023–24 season, he served as head coach at Volley Bergamo 1991 and made a name for himself with his performance there.

=== Galatasaray ===
Galatasaray has reached an agreement with Bigarelli for the 2024–25 season. Announced as the head coach of the Galatasaray Women's Volleyball Team on December 31, 2024, Bigarelli is expected to play an important role in the yellow-red club achieving its goals with the experience he has gained despite his young age.

In the statement made by the Galatasaray club on June 20, 2025, it was stated that Bigarelli will serve as an assistant coach until the end of the 2025–26 season.

In the 2025–26 season, Bigarelli served as head coach for Galatasaray Daikin Istanbul. He played a key role in the team's victory in the CEV Volleyball Cup 2026, their first European title. Galatasaray defeated Italy's Reale Mutua Fenera Chieri '76 3–1 in the final played on 8 April 2026 in Istanbul (set scores: 25–27, 25–22, 25–18, 25–18).
