= FIVB Women's Volleyball Nations League statistics =

This article gives the summarized final standings of each FIVB Women's Volleyball Nations League tournament, an annual competition involving national women's volleyball teams.

After the sixth edition in 2024, United States won three golds (2018, 2019, 2021), Italy won two gold medals (2022, 2024), Turkey also won gold (2023), silver (2018) and bronze (2021), Brazil won three silvers (2019, 2021, 2022), China won silver (2023) and two bronze (2018, 2019), Japan won one silver medal (2024), Poland won two bronze medal (2023, 2024) and Serbia won bronze medal (2022).

== Results summary ==
=== 2018 FIVB Women's Volleyball Nations League statistics ===
==== Squads ====
The 16 national teams involved in the tournament were required to register a squad of 21 players, which every week's 14-player roster must be selected from. Each country must declare its 14-player roster two days before the start of each week's round-robin competition.

==== Preliminary round ====
Pos	Team	Pld	W	L	Pts	SW	SL	SR	SPW	SPL	SPR	Qualification or relegation
1	United States	15	13	2	40	42	8	5.250	1227	997	1.231	Final round
2	Serbia	15	12	3	37	41	15	2.733	1324	1141	1.160	Final round
3	Brazil	15	12	3	35	40	20	2.000	1376	1229	1.120	Final round
4	Netherlands	15	12	3	34	39	18	2.167	1327	1176	1.128	Final round
5	Turkey	15	11	4	35	40	19	2.105	1351	1244	1.086	Final round
6	Italy	15	10	5	29	34	22	1.545	1230	1136	1.083	
7	Russia	15	8	7	23	26	29	0.897	1194	1198	0.997	
8	Poland	15	8	7	22	29	29	1.000	1298	1211	1.072	
9	China (Note: Qualified as hosts)	15	7	8	22	29	27	1.074	1237	1178	1.050	Final round
10	Japan	15	7	8	20	27	31	0.871	1209	1273	0.950	
11	Germany	15	5	10	15	23	35	0.657	1220	1315	0.928	
12	South Korea	15	5	10	14	16	34	0.471	1022	1141	0.896	
13	Belgium	15	4	11	12	18	36	0.500	1115	1250	0.892	
14	Dominican Republic	15	3	12	12	17	37	0.459	1072	1245	0.861	
15	Thailand	15	2	13	7	17	41	0.415	1218	1355	0.899	
16	Argentina	15	1	14	3	5	42	0.119	830	1161	0.715	Excluded from 2019 Nations League

Source: VNL 2018 standings

==== Final round 2018 ====
Pos	Team	Pld	W	L	Pts	SW	SL	SR	SPW	SPL	SPR	Result
1st place, gold medalist(s)	United States	4	4	0	10	12	5	2.400	383	348	1.101	Champions
2nd place, silver medalist(s)	Turkey	4	2	2	7	10	8	1.250	374	382	0.979	Runners up
3rd place, bronze medalist(s)	China	4	2	2	6	7	7	1.000	320	316	1.013	Third place
4	Brazil	4	2	2	6	6	6	1.000	280	270	1.037	Fourth place
5	Netherlands	2	0	2	0	1	6	0.167	142	170	0.835	Eliminated in pool play
5	Serbia	2	0	2	1	2	6	0.333	171	184	0.929	Eliminated in pool play

==== Final four ====
Semifinals
30 June
Brazil	0
Turkey	3
30 June
China	1
United States	3

final
1 July
Turkey	2
United States	3
3rd place match
1 July
China	3
Brazil	0

=== 2019 FIVB Women's Volleyball Nations League statistics ===
==== Squads ====
The 16 national teams involved in the tournament were required to register a squad of 25 players, which every week's 14-player roster must be selected from. Each country must declare its 14-player roster two days before the start of each week's round-robin competition.

==== Preliminary round ====
Pos	Team	Pld	W	L	Pts	SW	SL	SR	SPW	SPL	SPR	Qualification or relegation
1	China (Note: Qualified as hosts)	15	12	3	35	37	12	3.083	1153	973	1.185	Final round
2	United States	15	12	3	35	39	17	2.294	1283	1137	1.128	Final round
3	Brazil	15	11	4	35	40	16	2.500	1318	1150	1.146	Final round
4	Italy	15	11	4	34	39	21	1.857	1375	1233	1.115	Final round
5	Turkey	15	11	4	32	36	18	2.000	1259	1109	1.135	Final round
6	Poland	15	9	6	26	33	29	1.138	1360	1354	1.004	Final round
7	Belgium	15	8	7	22	28	29	0.966	1208	1260	0.959	
8	Dominican Republic	15	8	7	21	31	33	0.939	1422	1437	0.990	
9	Japan	15	7	8	22	27	27	1.000	1225	1213	1.010	
10	Germany	15	7	8	21	24	29	0.828	1169	1180	0.991	
11	Netherlands	15	6	9	20	27	30	0.900	1206	1259	0.958	
12	Thailand	15	5	10	16	17	33	0.515	1046	1170	0.894	
13	Serbia	15	5	10	15	20	33	0.606	1132	1210	0.936	
14	Russia	15	3	12	10	16	38	0.421	1112	1283	0.867	
15	South Korea	15	3	12	9	16	37	0.432	1092	1222	0.894	
16	Bulgaria	15	2	13	7	13	41	0.317	1126	1296	0.869	Excluded from 2020 Nations League

Source: VNL 2019 standings

==== Final round 2019 ====
Pos	Team	Pld	W	L	Pts	SW	SL	SR	SPW	SPL	SPR	Result
1st place, gold medalist(s)	United States	4	4	0	11	12	5	2.400	389	335	1.161	Champions
2nd place, silver medalist(s)	Brazil	4	2	2	6	9	8	1.125	366	350	1.046	Runners up
3rd place, bronze medalist(s)	China	4	2	2	6	8	8	1.000	353	357	0.989	Third place
4	Turkey	4	2	2	6	7	7	1.000	304	315	0.965	Fourth place
5	Poland	2	0	2	1	3	6	0.500	180	206	0.874	Eliminated in pool play
6	Italy	2	0	2	0	1	6	0.167	143	172	0.831	Eliminated in pool play

==== Final four ====
Semifinals
6 July
Turkey	0
Brazil	3
6 July
United States	3
China	1

Final
7 July
Brazil	2
United States	3
3rd place match
7 July
Turkey	1
China	3

=== 2021 FIVB Women's Volleyball Nations League statistics ===
==== Squads ====
The 16 teams compete in a round-robin format. The teams play 3 matches each week and compete five weeks long, for 120 matches. The top four teams after the preliminary round compete in the final round.

==== Preliminary round ====
Pos	Team	Pld	W	L	Pts	SW	SL	SR	SPW	SPL	SPR	Qualification
1	United States	15	14	1	42	42	7	6.000	1199	931	1.288	Final round
2	Brazil	15	13	2	40	42	10	4.200	1251	954	1.311	Final round
3	Japan	15	12	3	33	36	18	2.000	1150	1026	1.121	Final round
4	Turkey	15	11	4	30	37	21	1.762	1304	1237	1.054	Final round
5	China	15	10	5	30	35	21	1.667	1254	1152	1.089	
6	Dominican Republic	15	9	6	29	34	25	1.360	1319	1281	1.030	
7	Netherlands	15	9	6	25	30	26	1.154	1265	1219	1.038	
8	Russia	15	8	7	24	30	26	1.154	1210	1180	1.025	
9	Belgium	15	8	7	19	27	34	0.794	1282	1333	0.962	
10	Germany	15	5	10	16	22	32	0.688	1055	1129	0.934	
11	Poland	15	5	10	15	24	36	0.667	1309	1335	0.981	
12	Italy (H)	15	4	11	16	24	35	0.686	1282	1347	0.952	
13	Serbia	15	4	11	14	19	36	0.528	1115	1274	0.875	
14	Canada	15	3	12	11	17	39	0.436	1094	1309	0.836	
15	South Korea	15	3	12	10	16	40	0.400	1157	1298	0.891	
16	Thailand	15	2	13	6	11	40	0.275	983	1224	0.803	

Source: VNL 2021 standings
(H) Host

==== Final round 2021 ====
Pos	Team	Pld	W	L	Pts	SW	SL	SR	SPW	SPL	SPR	Result
1st place, gold medalist(s)	United States	2	2	0	6	6	1	6.000	176	159	1.107	Champions
2nd place, silver medalist(s)	Brazil	2	1	1	3	4	4	1.000	199	186	1.070	Runners up
3rd place, bronze medalist(s)	Turkey	2	1	1	3	3	3	1.000	139	127	1.094	Third place
4	Japan	2	0	2	0	1	6	0.167	137	179	0.765	Fourth place

Source: VNL 2021 final standings

==== Final four ====
Semi-finals
24 June
Brazil	3
Japan	1
24 June
United States	3
Turkey	0

Final
25 June
Brazil	1
United States	3
Third place match
25 June
Japan	0
Turkey	3

=== 2022 FIVB Women's Volleyball Nations League statistics ===
==== Preliminary round ====
In the 2022 tournament, the format of play was changed. The new format will see 16 women's teams competing in pools of 8 teams during the pool phase. Eight teams will then move into the final knockout phase of the competition.

Pos	Team	Pld	W	L	Pts	SW	SL	SR	SPW	SPL	SPR	Qualification or relegation
1	United States	12	11	1	32	33	7	4.714	961	810	1.186	Final round
2	Brazil	12	10	2	29	31	12	2.583	997	898	1.110	Final round
3	Italy	12	10	2	29	31	13	2.385	1021	888	1.150	Final round
4	China	12	8	4	26	29	17	1.706	1046	923	1.133	Final round
5	Japan	12	8	4	25	30	16	1.875	1042	931	1.119	Final round
6	Serbia	12	8	4	23	27	20	1.350	1042	1044	0.998	Final round
7	Turkey (Note: Qualified as hosts)	12	7	5	23	28	18	1.556	1060	966	1.097	Final round
8	Thailand	12	5	7	15	22	25	0.880	994	1049	0.948	Final round
9	Dominican Republic	12	5	7	14	19	27	0.704	926	1039	0.891	
10	Germany	12	4	8	14	20	27	0.741	1045	1057	0.989	
11	Netherlands	12	4	8	14	20	28	0.714	1010	1047	0.965	
12	Canada	12	4	8	12	17	26	0.654	961	989	0.972	
13	Poland	12	4	8	12	18	29	0.621	1005	1049	0.958	
14	Bulgaria	12	4	8	12	14	27	0.519	867	914	0.949	
15	Belgium	12	4	8	8	18	32	0.563	1034	1130	0.915	2022 Challenger Cup
16	South Korea	12	0	12	0	3	36	0.083	701	978	0.717	

Source: VNL 2022 standings

==== Final round 2022 ====
The VNL Finals will see the seven strongest teams along with the finals host country Turkey moving directly to the knockout phase which will consist of eight matches in total: four quarterfinals, two semi-finals and the bronze and gold medal matches.

Pos	Team	Pld	W	L	Pts	SW	SL	SR	SPW	SPL	SPR	Result
1st place, gold medalist(s)	Italy	3	3	0	9	9	1	9.000	252	222	1.135	Champions
2nd place, silver medalist(s)	Brazil	3	2	1	6	6	5	1.200	259	253	1.024	Runners up
3rd place, bronze medalist(s)	Serbia	3	2	1	5	7	5	1.400	273	269	1.015	Third place
4	Turkey	3	1	2	3	3	7	0.429	230	235	0.979	Fourth place
5	United States	1	0	1	1	2	3	0.667	113	109	1.037	Eliminated in quarterfinals
6	China	1	0	1	0	1	3	0.333	89	99	0.899	Eliminated in quarterfinals
7	Japan	1	0	1	0	1	3	0.333	92	102	0.902	Eliminated in quarterfinals
8	Thailand	1	0	1	0	1	3	0.333	79	98	0.806	Eliminated in quarterfinals

Source: VNL 2022 final standings

==== Final eighth ====
Quarter-finals
14 July
Turkey	3
Thailand	1
14 July
Italy	3
China	1
13 July
United States	2
Serbia	3
13 July
Brazil	3
Japan	1

Semi-finals
16 July
Turkey	0
Italy	3
16 July
Serbia	1
Brazil	3

Final
17 July
Italy	3
Brazil	0
Third place match
17 July
Turkey	0
Serbia	3

=== 2023 FIVB Women's Volleyball Nations League statistics ===
==== Squads ====
Source:

==== Preliminary round ====
Pos	Team	Pld	W	L	Pts	SW	SL	SR	SPW	SPL	SPR	Qualification or relegation
1	Poland	12	10	2	29	32	13	2.462	1069	962	1.111	Final round
2	United States (Note: Qualified as hosts)	12	10	2	28	34	16	2.125	1099	1004	1.095	Final round
3	Turkey	12	9	3	29	31	11	2.818	1008	850	1.186	Final round
4	Brazil	12	8	4	24	28	18	1.556	1065	987	1.079	Final round
5	China	12	8	4	24	29	19	1.526	1089	993	1.097	Final round
6	Italy	12	8	4	21	29	23	1.261	1129	1106	1.021	Final round
7	Japan	12	7	5	21	27	20	1.350	1058	969	1.092	Final round
8	Germany	12	7	5	20	26	23	1.130	1077	1069	1.007	Final round
9	Serbia	12	6	6	19	27	27	1.000	1154	1121	1.029	
10	Canada	12	6	6	18	24	24	1.000	1031	1044	0.988	
11	Dominican Republic	12	6	6	14	25	28	0.893	1151	1119	1.029	
12	Netherlands	12	5	7	18	23	22	1.045	1023	997	1.026	
13	Bulgaria	12	2	10	9	14	31	0.452	853	1013	0.842	
14	Thailand	12	2	10	8	11	30	0.367	837	981	0.853	
15	Croatia	12	2	10	6	8	30	0.267	734	910	0.807	2023 Challenger Cup
16	South Korea	12	0	12	0	3	36	0.083	730	982	0.743	

Source: VNL 2023 Preliminary Phase

==== Final round 2023 ====
The VNL Finals will see the seven strongest teams along with the finals host country United States moving directly to the knockout phase which will consist of eight matches in total: four quarterfinals, two semi-finals and the bronze and gold medal matches.

Pos	Team	Pld	W	L	Pts	SW	SL	SR	SPW	SPL	SPR	Result
1st place, gold medalist(s)	Turkey	3	3	0	9	9	2	4.500	273	221	1.235	Champions
2nd place, silver medalist(s)	China	3	2	1	6	7	4	1.750	252	250	1.008	Runners up
3rd place, bronze medalist(s)	Poland	3	2	1	5	6	6	1.000	262	256	1.023	Third place
4	United States	3	1	2	4	6	7	0.857	278	289	0.962	Fourth place
5	Brazil	1	0	1	0	1	3	0.333	89	95	0.937	Eliminated in quarterfinals
6	Italy	1	0	1	0	0	3	0.000	53	75	0.707	Eliminated in quarterfinals
7	Japan	1	0	1	0	1	3	0.333	87	93	0.935	Eliminated in quarterfinals
8	Germany	1	0	1	0	1	3	0.333	82	97	0.845	Eliminated in quarterfinals

Source: VNL 2023 final standings

==== Final eighth ====
Quarter-finals
12 July
Poland	3
Germany	1
13 July
Brazil	1
China	3
12 July
United States	3
Japan	1
13 July
Turkey	3
Italy	0

Semi-finals
15 July
Poland	0
China	3
15 July
United States	1
Turkey	3

Final
16 July
China	1
Turkey	3
Third place match
16 July
Poland	3
United States	2

=== 2024 FIVB Women's Volleyball Nations League statistics ===
==== Squads ====
Source:

==== Preliminary round ====
Pos	Team	Pld	W	L	Pts	SW	SL	SR	SPW	SPL	SPR	Qualification
1	Brazil	12	12	0	34	36	9	4.000	1075	873	1.231	Final round
2	Italy	12	10	2	31	32	10	3.200	1010	812	1.244	Final round
3	Poland	12	10	2	30	31	8	3.875	942	838	1.124	Final round
4	China	12	9	3	26	29	14	2.071	1000	886	1.129	Final round
5	Japan	12	8	4	25	28	16	1.750	1011	909	1.112	Final round
6	Turkey	12	8	4	25	29	18	1.611	1060	977	1.085	Final round
7	United States	12	7	5	22	27	17	1.588	1018	944	1.078	Final round
8	Netherlands	12	7	5	21	24	18	1.333	965	903	1.069	
9	Canada	12	7	5	20	24	19	1.263	975	945	1.032	
10	Dominican Republic	12	3	9	10	15	29	0.517	956	1029	0.929	
11	Serbia	12	3	9	9	16	29	0.552	968	1058	0.915	
12	Germany	12	3	9	9	14	28	0.500	907	974	0.931	
13	Thailand (Note: Qualified as host)	12	3	9	7	12	32	0.375	878	1031	0.852	Final round
14	France	12	2	10	8	10	32	0.313	827	993	0.833	
15	South Korea	12	2	10	6	8	33	0.242	751	970	0.774	
16	Bulgaria	12	2	10	5	11	34	0.324	863	1064	0.811	

Source: VNL 2024 – Women's standings

==== Final round 2024 ====
The VNL Finals will see the seven strongest teams along with the finals host country Thailand moving directly to the knockout phase which will consist of eight matches in total: four quarterfinals, two semi-finals and the bronze and gold medal matches.

Pos	Team	Pld	W	L	Pts	SW	SL	SR	SPW	SPL	SPR	Result
1st place, gold medalist(s)	Italy	3	3	0	9	9	1	9.000	246	191	1.288	Champions
2nd place, silver medalist(s)	Japan	3	2	1	5	7	5	1.400	262	267	0.981	Runners up
3rd place, bronze medalist(s)	Poland	3	2	1	4	6	7	0.857	261	282	0.926	Third place
4	Brazil	3	1	2	5	7	6	1.167	286	282	1.014	Fourth place
5	China	1	0	1	0	0	3	0.000	64	75	0.853	Eliminated in quarterfinals
6	Turkey	1	0	1	1	2	3	0.667	103	104	0.990	Eliminated in quarterfinals
7	United States	1	0	1	0	0	3	0.000	65	75	0.867	Eliminated in quarterfinals
8	Thailand	1	0	1	0	0	3	0.000	64	75	0.853	Eliminated in quarterfinals

Source: VNL 2024 final standings

==== Final eighth ====
Quarter-finals
20 June
Thailand	0
Brazil	3
20 June
China	0
Japan	3
21 June
Italy	3
United States	0
21 June
Poland	3
Turkey	2

Semi-finals
22 June
Brazil	2
Japan	3
22 June
Italy	3
Poland	0

Final
23 June
Japan	1
Italy	3
Third place match
23 June
Brazil	2
Poland	3

=== 2025 FIVB Women's Volleyball Nations League statistics ===
==== Squads ====
Source:

==== Preliminary round ====
The format of play is generally the same as in the 2022 edition. However, the current format has the 18 women's teams competing in pools of 6 teams during the pool phase. Each team play 12 matches during the pool stage. Eight teams will then move into the final knockout phase of the competition.

Pos	Team	Pld	W	L	Pts	SW	SL	SR	SPW	SPL	SPR	Qualification or relegation
1	Italy	12	12	0	33	36	7	5.143	1037	822	1.262	Final round
2	Brazil	12	11	1	31	33	11	3.000	1051	906	1.160	Final round
3	Japan	12	9	3	27	30	12	2.500	966	858	1.126	Final round
4	Poland (Note: Qualified as finals' host)	12	9	3	27	31	15	2.067	1067	957	1.115	Final round
5	China	12	9	3	24	30	20	1.500	1142	1059	1.078	Final round
6	Turkey	12	8	4	23	28	17	1.647	1025	927	1.106	Final round
7	Germany	12	7	5	23	29	22	1.318	1110	1092	1.016	Final round
8	United States	12	7	5	20	26	23	1.130	1084	1085	0.999	Final round
9	France	12	5	7	17	23	25	0.920	1010	1042	0.969	
10	Netherlands	12	5	7	15	19	27	0.704	972	1029	0.945	
11	Czech Republic	12	5	7	14	21	26	0.808	1032	1046	0.987	
12	Dominican Republic	12	5	7	13	20	27	0.741	1028	1071	0.960	
13	Bulgaria	12	4	8	11	19	31	0.613	1001	1142	0.877	
14	Belgium	12	4	8	11	15	29	0.517	931	1029	0.905	
15	Serbia	12	3	9	14	21	28	0.750	1043	1068	0.977	
16	Canada	12	3	9	10	19	33	0.576	1099	1157	0.950	
17	Thailand	12	1	11	6	11	34	0.324	948	1059	0.895	
18	South Korea	12	1	11	5	11	35	0.314	877	1074	0.817	Excluded from the Nations League

Source: VNL 2025 – Women's standings

==== Final round 2025 ====
The VNL Finals will see the seven strongest teams along with the finals host country Poland moving directly to the knockout phase which will consist of eight matches in total: four quarterfinals, two semi-finals and the bronze and gold medal matches.

Pos	Team	Pld	W	L	Pts	SW	SL	SR	SPW	SPL	SPR	Result
1st place, gold medalist(s)	Italy	3	3	0	9	9	1	9.000	250	204	1.225	Champions
2nd place, silver medalist(s)	Brazil	3	2	1	5	7	5	1.400	270	251	1.076	Runners up
3rd place, bronze medalist(s)	Poland	3	2	1	5	6	6	1.000	248	256	0.969	Third place
4	Japan	3	1	2	3	6	8	0.750	280	306	0.915	Fourth place
5	China	1	0	1	1	2	3	0.667	101	101	1.000	Eliminated in quarterfinals
6	Turkey	1	0	1	1	2	3	0.667	100	103	0.971	Eliminated in quarterfinals
7	Germany	1	0	1	0	0	3	0.000	57	76	0.750	Eliminated in quarterfinals
8	United States	1	0	1	0	0	3	0.000	69	78	0.885	Eliminated in quarterfinals

Source: VNL 2025 final standings

==== Final eighth ====
Quarter-finals
23 July
Italy	3
United States	0
23 July
Poland	3
China	2
24 July
Brazil	3
Germany	0
24 July
Japan	3
Turkey	2

Semi-finals
26 July
Italy	3
Poland	0
26 July
Brazil	3
Japan	2

Final
27 July
Italy	3
Brazil	1
Third place match
27 July
Poland	3
Japan	1

=== 2026 FIVB Women's Volleyball Nations League statistics ===
==== Preliminary round ====
The current format has the 18 women's teams competing in pools of 6 teams during the pool phase. Each team play 12 matches during the pool stage. Eight teams will then move into the final knockout phase of the competition.

Pos	Team	Pld	W	L	Pts	SW	SL	SR	SPW	SPL	SPR	Qualification or relegation
1	United States	12	10	2	29	32	11	2.909	1025	862	1.189	Final round
2	Italy	12	10	2	28	32	14	2.286	1063	929	1.144	Final round
3	Brazil	12	9	3	26	29	18	1.611	1083	983	1.102	Final round
4	Turkey	12	9	3	25	30	19	1.579	1109	1036	1.070	Final round
5	Canada	12	8	4	24	30	21	1.429	1148	1140	1.007	Final round
6	Japan	12	8	4	21	27	21	1.286	1103	1047	1.053	Final round
7	Netherlands	12	7	5	21	24	15	1.600	889	859	1.035	Final round
8	Poland	12	7	5	20	28	23	1.217	1127	1084	1.040	
9	China (Note: Qualified as finals' host)	12	6	6	19	26	23	1.130	1072	1056	1.015	Final round
10	Czech Republic	12	6	6	16	19	23	0.826	914	914	1.000	
11	Serbia	12	5	7	20	26	21	1.238	1040	1009	1.031	
12	Germany	12	5	7	17	21	25	0.840	1011	1014	0.997	
13	Belgium	12	4	8	10	17	32	0.531	1000	1085	0.922	
14	Thailand	12	3	9	12	17	28	0.607	956	1018	0.939	
15	Dominican Republic	12	3	9	11	17	31	0.548	977	1094	0.893	
16	Ukraine	12	3	9	10	18	31	0.581	993	1099	0.904	
17	France	12	3	9	10	17	32	0.531	1000	1131	0.884	
18	Bulgaria	12	2	10	5	10	32	0.313	849	999	0.850	Excluded from the Nations League

Source: VNL 2026 – Women's standings

==== Final round 2026 ====
The VNL Finals will see the seven strongest teams along with the finals host country China moving directly to the knockout phase which will consist of eight matches in total: four quarterfinals, two semi-finals and the bronze and gold medal matches.

Pos	Team	Pld	W	L	Pts	SW	SL	SR	SPW	SPL	SPR	Result
1st place, gold medalist(s)	Turkey	15	12	3	34	39	21	1.857	1380	1269	1.087	Champions
2nd place, silver medalist(s)	Brazil	15	11	4	31	36	24	1.500	1383	1273	1.086	Runners up
3rd place, bronze medalist(s)	Italy	15	12	3	35	40	18	2.222	1343	1166	1.152	Third place
4	China (H)	15	7	8	21	30	31	0.968	1301	1335	0.975	Fourth place
5	United States	13	10	3	30	34	14	2.429	1131	959	1.179	Eliminated in quarterfinals
6	Canada	13	8	5	24	31	24	1.292	1232	1237	0.996	Eliminated in quarterfinals
7	Japan	13	8	5	21	28	24	1.167	1187	1146	1.036	Eliminated in quarterfinals
8	Netherlands	13	7	6	21	24	18	1.333	942	934	1.009	Eliminated in quarterfinals

Source: VNL 2026 live center
(H) Host

==== Final eighth ====
Quarter-finals
23 July
United States	2
China	3
23 July
Turkey	3
Canada	1
22 July
Brazil	3
Japan	1
22 July
Italy	3
Netherlands	0

Semi-finals
25 July
China	0
Turkey	3
25 July
Brazil	3
Italy	2

Final
26 July
Turkey	3
Brazil	1
Third place match
26 July
China	1
Italy	3

== Tournament statistics ==
Edition	Played	Attendance	Preliminary round Sets	Final round Sets	Total Sets	Preliminary round Points	Final round Points	Total Points	Final Match	Attendance in Final
2018	130	399,149 (3,070 per match)	443	38	481 (3.7 per match)	19,250	1,670	20,920 (161 per match)	Turkey 2–3 United States	3,500
2019	130	399,575 (3,074 per match)	443	40	483 (3.7 per match)	19,486	1,735	21,221 (163 per match)	Brazil 2–3 United States	6,000
2021	124	0 (0 per match)	446	14	460 (3.71 per match)	19,229	651	19,880 (160 per match)	Brazil 1–3 United States	0
2022	104	256,881 (2,470 per match)	360	30	390 (3.75 per match)	15,712	1,387	17,099 (164 per match)	Italy 3–0 Brazil	7,002
2023	104	344,618 (3,314 per match)	371	31	402 (3.87 per match)	16,107	1,376	17,483 (168 per match)	China 1–3 Turkey	5,838
2024	104	371,655 (3,574 per match)	346	31	377 (3.63 per match)	15,206	1,351	16,557 (159 per match)	Japan 1–3 Italy	6,033
2025	116	459,150 (3,958 per match)	422	32	454 (3.91 per match)	18,423	1,375	19,798 (171 per match)	Italy 3–1 Brazil	7,837
2026	116	428,221 (3,692 per match)	420	32	452 (3.89 per match)	18,359	1,407	19,766 (170 per match)	Turkey 3–1 Brazil	4,000
Total	928	2,659,249 (2,866 per match)	3,251	248	3,499 (3.77 per match)	141,772	10,952	152,724 (164.6 per match)	24 medals (8 editions completed)	40,210 (5,744 per final)

(**) Table is current through the end of 2026 Nations League.

== Medals summary ==
Rank	Nation	Gold	Silver	Bronze	Total
1	Italy	3	0	1	4
2	United States	3	0	0	3
3	Turkey	2	1	1	4
4	Brazil	0	5	0	5
5	China	0	1	2	3
6	Japan	0	1	0	1
7	Poland	0	0	3	3
8	Serbia	0	0	1	1
Totals (8 entries)		8	8	8	24

=== Volleyball Nations League (2018–present) ===
Years	VNL Hosts	Gold	Silver	Bronze
2018	(China) Nanjing	United States	Turkey	China
2019	(China) Nanjing	United States	Brazil	China
2021	(Italy) Rimini	United States	Brazil	Turkey
2022	(Turkey) Ankara	Italy	Brazil	Serbia
2023	(United States) Arlington	Turkey	China	Poland
2024	(Thailand) Bangkok	Italy	Japan	Poland
2025	(Poland) Łódź	Italy	Brazil	Poland
2026	Macau	Turkey	Brazil	Italy

== Team participations ==
=== Appearance ===
Team	League Round			Final Round		
Team	App.	First	Last	App.	First	Last
Argentina	1	2018	2018	–	–	–
Belgium	6	2018	2026	–	–	–
Brazil	8	2018	2026	8	2018	2026
Bulgaria	6	2019	2026	–	–	–
Canada	6	2021	2026	1	2026	2026
China	8	2018	2026	7	2018	2026
Croatia	1	2023	2023	–	–	–
Czech Republic	2	2025	2026	–	–	–
Dominican Republic	8	2018	2026	–	–	–
France	3	2024	2026	–	–	–
Germany	8	2018	2026	2	2023	2025
Italy	8	2018	2026	6	2019	2026
Japan	8	2018	2026	6	2021	2026
Netherlands	8	2018	2026	2	2018	2026
Poland	8	2018	2026	4	2019	2025
Russia	3	2018	2021	–	–	–
Serbia	8	2018	2026	2	2018	2022
South Korea	7	2018	2025	–	–	–
Thailand	8	2018	2026	2	2022	2024
Turkey	8	2018	2026	8	2018	2026
Ukraine	1	2026	2026	–	–	–
United States	8	2018	2026	8	2018	2026
Table current through the end of the 2026 edition.

=== Rankings ===
==== 2018–2024 ====
Rank	VNL 2018
1st place, gold medalist(s)	United States
2nd place, silver medalist(s)	Turkey
3rd place, bronze medalist(s)	China
4	Brazil
5	Netherlands
5	Serbia
7	Italy
8	Russia
9	Poland
10	Japan
11	Germany
12	South Korea
13	Belgium
14	Dominican Republic
15	Thailand
16	Argentina

Rank	VNL 2019
1st place, gold medalist(s)	United States
2nd place, silver medalist(s)	Brazil
3rd place, bronze medalist(s)	China
4	Turkey
5	Poland
6	Italy
7	Belgium
8	Dominican Republic
9	Japan
10	Germany
11	Netherlands
12	Thailand
13	Serbia
14	Russia
15	South Korea
16	Bulgaria

Rank	VNL 2021
1st place, gold medalist(s)	United States
2nd place, silver medalist(s)	Brazil
3rd place, bronze medalist(s)	Turkey
4	Japan
5	China
6	Dominican Republic
7	Netherlands
8	Russia
9	Belgium
10	Germany
11	Poland
12	Italy
13	Serbia
14	Canada
15	South Korea
16	Thailand

Rank	VNL 2022
1st place, gold medalist(s)	Italy
2nd place, silver medalist(s)	Brazil
3rd place, bronze medalist(s)	Serbia
4	Turkey
5	United States
6	China
7	Japan
8	Thailand
9	Dominican Republic
10	Germany
11	Netherlands
12	Canada
13	Poland
14	Bulgaria
15	Belgium
16	South Korea

Rank	VNL 2023
1st place, gold medalist(s)	Turkey
2nd place, silver medalist(s)	China
3rd place, bronze medalist(s)	Poland
4	United States
5	Brazil
6	Italy
7	Japan
8	Germany
9	Serbia
10	Canada
11	Dominican Republic
12	Netherlands
13	Bulgaria
14	Thailand
15	Croatia
16	South Korea

Rank	VNL 2024
1st place, gold medalist(s)	Italy
2nd place, silver medalist(s)	Japan
3rd place, bronze medalist(s)	Poland
4	Brazil
5	China
6	Turkey
7	United States
8	Thailand
9	Netherlands
10	Canada
11	Dominican Republic
12	Serbia
13	Germany
14	France
15	South Korea
16	Bulgaria

==== 2025–present ====
Rank	VNL 2025
1st place, gold medalist(s)	Italy
2nd place, silver medalist(s)	Brazil
3rd place, bronze medalist(s)	Poland
4	Japan
5	China
6	Turkey
7	Germany
8	United States
9	France
10	Netherlands
11	Czech Republic
12	Dominican Republic
13	Bulgaria
14	Belgium
15	Serbia
16	Canada
17	Thailand
18	South Korea

Rank	VNL 2026
1st place, gold medalist(s)	Turkey
2nd place, silver medalist(s)	Brazil
3rd place, bronze medalist(s)	Italy
4	China
5	United States
6	Canada
7	Japan
8	Netherlands
9	Poland
10	Czech Republic
11	Serbia
12	Germany
13	Belgium
14	Thailand
15	Dominican Republic
16	Ukraine
17	France
18	Bulgaria

=== Team performances by season ===
Legend

- 1st – Champions
- 2nd – Runners-up
- 3rd – Third place
- 4th – Fourth place
- – No movement for challenger teams
- ▲ – Promoted to the next year's VNL
- ▼ – Relegated for the challenger teams (2018–2024)/Relegated from the VNL (2025–present)

Team	2018 (16)			2019 (16)			2021 (16)			2022 (16)			2023 (16)			2024 (16)			2025 (18)		2026 (18)	
Team	G	FR	RK	G	FR	RK	G	FR	RK	G	FR	RK	G	FR	RK	G	FR	RK	FR	RK	FR	RK
Argentina	CH ▼	P	16	VCC			VCC (canceled)			did not participate						VCC			did not participate			
Belgium	CH	P	13	CH	P	7	CH	P	9	CH ▼	P	15	did not participate			VCC			P	14	P	13
Brazil	C	F	4	C	F	2	C	F	2	C	F	2	C	F	5	C	F	4	F	2	F	2
Bulgaria	VCC ▲			CH ▼	P	16	VCC (canceled)			CH	P	14	CH	P	13	CH	P	16	F	13	P	18 ▼
Canada	did not participate			VCC ▲			CH	P	14	CH	P	12	CH	P	10	CH	P	10	P	16	F	6
China	C	F	3	C	F	3	C	P	5	C	F	6	C	F	2	C	F	5	F	5	F	4
Croatia	did not participate			VCC			VCC (canceled)			VCC ▲			CH ▼	P	15	did not participate						
Czech Republic	did not participate			VCC			VCC (canceled)			VCC			did not participate			VCC ▲			P	11	P	10
Dominican Republic	CH	P	14	CH	P	8	CH	P	6	CH	P	9	CH	P	11	CH	P	11	P	12	P	15
France	did not participate						VCC (canceled)			VCC			VCC ▲			CH	P	14	P	9	P	17
Germany	C	P	11	C	P	10	C	P	10	C	P	10	C	F	8	C	P	13	F	7	P	12
Italy	C	P	7	C	F	5	C	P	12	C	F	1	C	F	6	C	F	1	F	1	F	3
Japan	C	P	10	C	P	9	C	F	4	C	F	7	C	F	7	C	F	2	F	4	F	7
Netherlands	C	F	5	C	P	11	C	P	7	C	P	11	C	P	12	C	P	9	P	10	F	8
Poland	CH	P	9	CH	F	5	CH	P	11	CH	P	13	CH	F	3	CH	F	3	F	3	P	9
Russia	C	P	8	C	P	14	C	P	8	Excluded (Note: Russian athletes were banned from competing following the 2022 Russian invasion of Ukraine.)												
Serbia	C	F	5	C	P	13	C	P	13	C	F	3	C	P	9	C	P	12	P	15	P	11
South Korea	C	P	12	C	P	15	C	P	15	C	P	16	C	P	16	C	P	15	P	18 ▼	did not participate	
Thailand	C	P	15	C	P	12	C	P	16	C	F	8	C	P	14	C	F	8	P	17	P	14
Turkey	C	F	2	C	F	4	C	F	3	C	F	4	C	F	1	C	F	6	F	6	F	1
Ukraine	did not participate												VCC			did not participate					P	16
United States	C	F	1	C	F	1	C	F	1	C	F	5	C	F	4	C	F	7	F	8	F	5
Table current through the end of the 2026 edition.

=== Debut of national teams ===
Year	Debutants	Total
2018	Argentina, Brazil, Belgium, China, Dominican Republic, Germany, Italy, Japan, Netherlands, Poland, Russia, Serbia, South Korea, Thailand, Turkey, United States	16
2019	Bulgaria	1
2021	Canada	1
2022	None	0
2023	Croatia	1
2024	France	1
2025	Czech Republic	1
2026	Ukraine	1
2027	Slovenia	1

=== By top four finishes ===
Rank	Nation	Number of appearances	Years in semifinals
1	Brazil	7	(2018, 2019, 2021, 2022, 2024, 2025, 2026)
2	Turkey	6	(2018, 2019, 2021, 2022, 2023, 2026)
3	United States	4	(2018, 2019, 2021, 2023)
3	Italy	4	(2022, 2024, 2025, 2026)
3	China	4	(2018, 2019, 2023, 2026)
6	Japan	3	(2021, 2024, 2025)
6	Poland	3	(2023, 2024, 2025)
8	Serbia	1	(2022)

== Statistics leaders ==
=== Preliminary round ===
Best Scorers (Note: (Best scorers determined by scored points from spike, block and serve).)
Year	Player	Spikes	Blocks	Serves	Total
2018	(Poland) Malwina Smarzek	306	42	13	361
2019	(Poland) Malwina Smarzek	376	34	11	421
2021	(Belgium) Britt Herbots	314	12	11	337
2022	(Belgium) Britt Herbots	231	12	6	249
2023	(Poland) Magdalena Stysiak	258	33	7	298
2024	(Turkey) Melissa Vargas	246	25	22	293
2025	(France) Iman Ndiaye	190	20	23	233
2026	(Canada) Kiera Van Ryk	226	21	24	271

Best Attackers (Note: (Best attackers determined by successful spikes).)
Year	Player	Spikes	Faults	Shots	Total
2018	(Serbia) Tijana Bošković	206	80	132	418
2019	(United States) Andrea Drews	205	68	153	426
2021	(Belgium) Britt Herbots	314	88	370	772
2022	(Belgium) Britt Herbots	282	83	400	765
2023	(China) Li Yingying	262	66	198	526
2024	(Turkey) Melissa Vargas	162	44	110	316
2025	(China) Wu Mengjie	204	56	193	453
2026	(Canada) Kiera Van Ryk	226	93	196	515

Best Blockers (Note: (Best blockers determined by the stuff blocks, faults and rebounds).)
Year	Player	Blocks	Faults	Rebounds	Total
2018	(Poland) Agnieszka Korneluk	52	85	123	260
2019	(Serbia) Maja Aleksić	47	64	85	196
2021	(Turkey) Eda Erdem	46	62	89	197
2022	(Brazil) Ana Carolina da Silva	52	56	50	158
2023	(Poland) Agnieszka Korneluk (2)	48	75	77	200
2024	(Serbia) Hena Kurtagić	33	39	57	129
2025	(Brazil) Júlia Kudiess	52	38	46	136
2026	(Brazil) Júlia Kudiess (2)	42	56	73	171

Best Servers (Note: (Best servers determined by aces, faults and hits).)
Year	Player	Aces	Faults	Hits	Total
2018	(Poland) Marlena Kowalewska	24	24	226	274
2019	(Belgium) Marlies Janssens	24	31	135	190
2021	(Belgium) Marlies Janssens	23	20	139	182
2022	(Canada) Kiera Van Ryk	20	50	78	148
2023	(Bulgaria) Maria Yordanova	19	21	115	155
2024	(Germany) Camilla Weitzel	16	12	101	129
2025	(France) Iman Ndiaye	23	38	109	170
2026	(Italy) Ekaterina Antropova	33	24	129	186

Best Setters (Note: (Best setters determined by running setts, faults and still sets).)
Year	Player	Running	Faults	Still	Total
2018	(Belgium) Ilka Van de Vyver	924	18	507	1449
2019	(Thailand) Nootsara Tomkom	337	9	796	1142
2021	(Netherlands) Britt Bongaerts	352	6	1207	1565
2022	(Thailand) Pornpun Guedpard	475	9	694	1178
2023	(China) Diao Linyu	322	12	958	1292
2024	(China) Diao Linyu	219	6	553	778
2025	(China) Zhang Zixuan	372	10	936	1318
2026	(Ukraine) Daria Sharhorodska	410	4	770	1184

Best Diggers (Note: (Best diggers determined by successful digs, faults and receptions).)
Year	Player	Digs	Faults	Receptions	Total
2018	(Netherlands) Maret Balkestein-Grothues	122	6	68	196
2019	(Germany) Lenka Dürr	186	48	67	301
2021	(Dominican Republic) Brenda Castillo	250	62	29	341
2022	(Poland) Maria Stenzel	176	27	17	220
2023	(Bulgaria) Mila Pashkuleva	176	41	19	236
2024	(Canada) Kiera Van Ryk	113	34	13	160
2025	(France) Juliette Gelin	180	52	63	295
2026	(France) Juliette Gelin	203	59	69	331

Best Receivers (Note: (Best receivers determined by efficient receptions, faults and serve receptions).)
Year	Player	Excellents	Faults	Serve	Total
2018	(United States) Kim Hill	61	9	163	233
2019	(Brazil) Gabriela Guimarães	167	21	283	471
2021	(Japan) Mayu Ishikawa	151	14	143	308
2022	(Germany) Anna Pogany	162	11	104	277
2023	(China) Yunlu Wang	89	23	211	323
2024	(Germany) Lena Stigrot	66	17	177	260
2025	(Germany) Lina Alsmeier	106	23	238	367
2026	(Serbia) Bojana Gočanin	115	12	195	322

=== Final Round ===
Best Scorers
Year	Player	Spikes	Blocks	Serves	Total
2018	(China) Zhu Ting	77	6	3	86
2019	(China) Liu Yanhan	70	5	5	80
2021	(Turkey) Ebrar Karakurt	38	7	1	46
2022	(Italy) Paola Egonu	72	6	5	83
2023	(Turkey) Melissa Vargas	55	5	5	65
2024	(Italy) Paola Egonu (2x)	59	8	2	69
2025	(Brazil) Gabriela Guimarães	44	7	1	52
2026	(Turkey) Melissa Vargas	71	4	8	83

Best Attackers
Year	Player	Spikes	Faults	Shots	Total
2018	(Brazil) Gabriela Guimarães	50	20	34	104
2019	(United States) Andrea Drews	69	18	45	132
2021	(Turkey) Ebrar Karakurt	38	7	28	73
2022	(Italy) Paola Egonu	72	23	58	153
2023	(Turkey) Melissa Vargas	55	12	42	109
2024	(Italy) Paola Egonu	59	5	51	115
2025	(Japan) Mayu Ishikawa	46	23	60	129
2026	(Turkey) Melissa Vargas	71	13	52	136

Best Blockers
Year	Player	Blocks	Faults	Rebounds	Total
2018	(Brazil) Adenízia da Silva	13	21	12	46
2019	(Poland) Agnieszka Kąkolewska	8	14	14	36
2021	(Brazil) Ana Carolina da Silva	10	7	9	26
2022	(Brazil) Ana Carolina da Silva	11	22	27	60
2023	(Turkey) Zehra Güneş	14	12	18	44
2024	(Brazil) Ana Carolina da Silva	17	23	22	62
2025	(Poland) Agnieszka Korneluk	17	10	18	45
2026	(Brazil) Luzia Nezzo	10	11	22	43

Best Servers
Year	Player	Aces	Faults	Hits	Total
2018	(United States) Jordan Larson	8	5	53	66
2019	(United States) Michelle Bartsch-Hackley	8	5	33	46
2021	(Japan) Sarina Koga	3	0	22	25
2022	(Turkey) Eda Erdem	5	3	28	36
2023	(Turkey) Melissa Vargas	5	4	39	48
2024	(Poland) Agnieszka Korneluk	6	5	34	45
2025	(Italy) Paola Egonu	4	8	14	26
2026	(Turkey) Melissa Vargas	8	10	32	50
2026	(Italy) Ekatarina Antropova	8	9	37	54

Best Setters
Year	Player	Running	Faults	Still	Total
2018	(Brazil) Roberta Ratzke	297	4	4	305
2019	(United States) Lauren Carlini	91	4	276	371
2021	(Brazil) Macris Carneiro	55	3	156	214
2022	(Brazil) Macris Carneiro	68	3	192	263
2023	(China) Diao Linyu	71	1	161	233
2024	(Poland) Joanna Wołosz	51	0	205	256
2025	(Japan) Nanami Seki	143	1	212	356
2026	(Turkey) Elif Şahin	88	1	206	295

Best Diggers
Year	Player	Digs	Faults	Receptions	Total
2018	(China) Zhu Ting	37	0	20	57
2019	(Turkey) Simge Şebnem Aköz	52	10	13	75
2021	(Japan) Ai Kurogo	28	5	3	36
2022	(Italy) Monica De Gennaro	37	9	8	54
2023	(Turkey) Gizem Örge	46	14	6	66
2024	(Brazil) Nyeme Costa	47	12	8	67
2025	(Italy) Monica De Gennaro	40	10	17	67
2026	(China) Wang Mengjie	42	14	16	72
2026	(Brazil) Marcelle Arruda	42	10	12	64

Best Receivers
Year	Player	Excellents	Faults	Serve	Total
2018	(Brazil) Gabriela Guimarães	25	0	42	67
2019	(Brazil) Gabriela Guimarães	30	1	46	77
2021	(United States) Michelle Bartsch-Hackley	34	1	42	77
2022	(Italy) Caterina Bosetti	36	3	33	72
2023	(Poland) Martyna Łukasik	22	6	58	86
2024	(Brazil) Gabriela Guimarães	36	2	47	85
2025	(Japan) Yoshino Sato	32	2	71	105
2026	(Brazil) Júlia Bergmann	28	3	78	109

== Team awards ==
=== Fair play award ===
Year	Team
(China) 2018	Not awarded
(China) 2019	Not awarded
(Italy) 2021	Not awarded
(Turkey) 2022	Not awarded
(United States) 2023	United States
(Thailand) 2024	Dominican Republic
(Poland) 2025	Not awarded
(Macau) 2026	Not awarded

== Individual awards ==
=== VNL Dream Team ===
Year	MVP	Middle Blockers		Setter	Outside Spikers		Opposite Spiker	Libero
(China) 2018	(United States) Michelle Bartsch-Hackley	(United States) TeTori Dixon	(Turkey) Eda Erdem Dündar	(Turkey) Cansu Özbay	(United States) Michelle Bartsch-Hackley	(China) Zhu Ting	(Brazil) Tandara Caixeta	(Brazil) Suelen Pinto
(China) 2019	(United States) Andrea Drews	(Brazil) Ana Beatriz Corrêa	(United States) Haleigh Washington	(Brazil) Macris Carneiro	(Brazil) Gabriela Guimarães	(China) Liu Yanhan	(Turkey) Ebrar Karakurt	(United States) Megan Courtney
(Italy) 2021	(United States) Michelle Bartsch-Hackley (2)	(Turkey) Eda Erdem Dündar (2)	(Brazil) Carol Gattaz	(United States) Jordyn Poulter	(United States) Michelle Bartsch-Hackley (2)	(Brazil) Gabriela Guimarães (2)	(Brazil) Tandara Caixeta (2)	(United States) Justine Wong-Orantes
(Turkey) 2022	(Italy) Paola Egonu	(Serbia) Jovana Stevanović	(Brazil) Ana Carolina da Silva	(Italy) Alessia Orro	(Italy) Caterina Bosetti	(Brazil) Gabriela Guimarães (3)	(Italy) Paola Egonu	(Italy) Monica De Gennaro
(United States) 2023	(Turkey) Melissa Vargas	(Turkey) Zehra Güneş	(China) Yuan Xinyue	(China) Diao Linyu	(China) Li Yingying	(Poland) Martyna Łukasik	(Turkey) Melissa Vargas	(Turkey) Gizem Örge
(Thailand) 2024	(Italy) Paola Egonu (2)	(Poland) Agnieszka Korneluk	(Italy) Sarah Luisa Fahr	(Italy) Alessia Orro (2)	(Japan) Sarina Koga	(Italy) Myriam Sylla	(Italy) Paola Egonu (2)	(Japan) Manami Kojima
(Poland) 2025	(Italy) Monica De Gennaro	(Poland) Agnieszka Korneluk (2)	(Brazil) Júlia Kudiess	(Italy) Alessia Orro (3)	(Italy) Myriam Sylla (2)	(Brazil) Gabriela Guimarães (4)	(Italy) Paola Egonu (3)	(Italy) Monica De Gennaro (2)
(Macau) 2026	(Turkey) Melissa Vargas	—N/a	(Brazil) Júlia Kudiess (2)	(Ukraine) Daria Sharhorodska	(Italy) Ekaterina Antropova	—N/a	(Canada) Kiera Van Ryk	(France) Juliette Gelin (Serbia) Bojana Gočanin

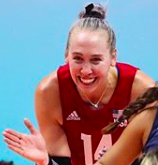
Michelle Bartsch-Hackley was the 2018 and 2021 FIVB Nations League Most Valuable Player

== All-time team records ==
Rank	Teams^{‡}	Played	Wins	Losses	Points	Set wins	Set lost	Set ratio	Points wins	Points lost	Points ratio	Final round	VNL Best results
1	Brazil	128	98	30	290	326	157	2.076	11265	9957	1.131	8	(silver) (2019, 2021, 2022, 2025, 2026)
2	United States	122	95	27	281	315	136	2.316	10475	9260	1.131	8	(gold) (2018, 2019, 2021)
3	Turkey	126	86	40	261	304	176	1.727	10970	10066	1.090	8	(gold) (2023, 2026)
4	Italy	120	86	34	255	293	161	1.820	10371	9374	1.106	6	(gold) (2022, 2024, 2025)
5	China	122	76	46	227	273	189	1.444	10401	9697	1.073	7	(silver) (2023)
6	Japan	116	69	47	202	249	189	1.317	9706	9272	1.047	6	(silver) (2024)
7	Poland	116	68	48	196	247	207	1.193	10128	9790	1.035	4	(bronze) (2023, 2024, 2025)
8	Netherlands	108	55	53	168	207	193	1.073	8852	8734	1.014	2	5th (2018)
9	Serbia	110	48	62	157	206	220	0.936	9262	9378	0.988	2	(bronze) (2022)
10	Germany (▲1)	107	43	64	135	180	227	0.793	8733	9003	0.970	2	7th (2025)
11	Dominican Republic (▼1)	105	42	63	124	178	237	0.751	8851	9315	0.950		6th (2021)
12	Belgium	81	32	49	82	123	192	0.641	6570	7087	0.927		7th (2019)
13	Canada	76	31	45	95	132	165	0.800	6392	6681	0.957	1	6th (2026)
14	Thailand	107	23	84	77	119	269	0.442	8003	9060	0.883	2	8th (2022, 2024)
15	Russia (Note: Russian athletes were banned from competing following the 2022 Russian invasion of Ukraine.)	45	19	26	57	72	93	0.774	3516	3661	0.960		8th (2018, 2021)
16	Bulgaria	75	16	59	49	81	196	0.413	5559	6428	0.865		13th (2023, 2025)
17	South Korea	93	14	79	44	73	251	0.291	6330	7665	0.826		12th (2018)
18	Czech Republic (▲1)	24	11	13	30	40	49	0.816	1946	1960	0.993		10th (2026)
19	France (▼1)	36	10	26	35	50	89	0.562	2837	3166	0.896		9th (2025)
20	Ukraine	12	3	9	10	18	31	0.581	993	1099	0.904		16th (2026)
21	Croatia (▼1)	12	2	10	6	8	30	0.267	734	910	0.807		15th (2023)
22	Argentina (▼1)	15	1	14	3	5	42	0.119	830	1161	0.715		16th (2018)
	Slovenia												debut (2027)
Total	22 teams	928 matches				3,499 sets (3.77 pg)			152,724 points (164.6 pg)			12 teams FR	24 medals

- ^{‡} Change since previous year rankings.
- Table current through the end of the 2026 Nations League.

=== Standing procedure ===
1. Total number of victories (matches won, matches lost)
2. In the event of a tie, the following first tiebreaker will apply: The teams will be ranked by the most points gained per match as follows:
  - Match won 3–0 or 3–1: 3 points for the winner, 0 points for the loser
  - Match won 3–2: 2 points for the winner, 1 point for the loser
  - Match forfeited: 3 points for the winner, 0 points (0–25, 0–25, 0–25) for the loser
3. If teams are still tied after examining the number of victories and points gained, then the FIVB will examine the results in order to break the tie in the following order:
  - Sets quotient: if two or more teams are tied on the number of points gained, they will be ranked by the quotient resulting from the division of the number of all sets won by the number of all sets lost.
  - Points quotient: if the tie persists based on the sets quotient, the teams will be ranked by the quotient resulting from the division of all points scored by the total of points lost during all sets.
  - If the tie persists based on the points quotient, the tie will be broken based on the team that won the match of the Round Robin Phase between the tied teams. When the tie in points quotient is between three or more teams, these teams ranked taking into consideration only the matches involving the teams in question.

== See also ==
- FIVB Men's Volleyball Nations League statistics
- FIVB Men's Volleyball Nations League
- Volleyball records and statistics
- Major achievements in volleyball by nation
- List of indoor volleyball world medalists
