= 2024 FIVB Women's Volleyball Nations League =

วอลเลย์บอลหญิง เนชันส์ ลีก 2024 (Thai); Won-lēi-bɔɔn yǐng Nē-chan Līk 2024

Tournament details
- Host country: Thailand
- City: Bangkok (final round)
- Dates: 14 May – 23 June 2024
- Teams: 16 (from 4 confederations)
- Venue: 7 (in 7 host cities)

Final positions
- Champions: Italy (2nd title)
- Runners-up: Japan
- Third place: Poland
- Fourth place: Brazil

Tournament awards
- MVP: (Italy) Paola Egonu
- Best Setter: (Italy) Alessia Orro
- Best OH: (Japan) Sarina Koga; (Italy) Myriam Sylla
- Best MB: (Poland) Agnieszka Korneluk; (Italy) Sarah Luisa Fahr
- Best OPP: (Italy) Paola Egonu
- Best Libero: (Japan) Manami Kojima

Tournament statistics
- Matches played: 104
- Attendance: 371,655 (3,574 per match)

The 2024 FIVB Women's Volleyball Nations League was the sixth edition of the FIVB Women's Volleyball Nations League, an annual women's international volleyball tournament. It was held between May and June 2024, and the final round took place at the Indoor Stadium Huamark in Bangkok, Thailand.

Following the results of the 2023 Nations League and the 2023 Challenger Cup, Croatia were replaced by debutants France in this edition.

Italy claimed their second VNL title after defeating Japan in the final. Japan took the silver medal, which was their best result in this tournament. Poland retained the bronze medal after defeating Brazil in the 3rd place match. Paola Egonu of Italy named as the MVP of the tournament.

== Teams ==
=== Qualification ===
Sixteen teams qualified for the competition. Eleven of them qualified as core teams which cannot face relegation. Other five teams were selected as challenger teams which could be relegated from the tournament. France replaced Croatia after winning the 2023 Challenger Cup. In a change of format for the next edition, none of current teams will be relegated and from the year 2025 onwards, the competition will consist from 18 teams. The two extra spots will be from the team that wins the 2024 Challenger Cup and the best FIVB ranked team who are not in this year event.

Country	Confederation	Designation	Previous appearances			Previous best performance
Country	Confederation	Designation	Total	First	Last	Previous best performance
Brazil	CSV	Core team	5	2018	2023	Runners-up (2019, 2021, 2022)
Bulgaria	CEV	Challenger team	3	2019	2023	13th place (2023)
Canada	NORCECA	Challenger team	3	2021	2023	10th place (2023)
China	AVC	Core team	5	2018	2023	Runners-up (2023)
Dominican Republic	NORCECA	Challenger team	5	2018	2023	6th place (2021)
France	CEV	Challenger team	0	None		Debut
Germany	CEV	Core team	5	2018	2023	8th place (2023)
Italy	CEV	Core team	5	2018	2023	Champions (2022)
Japan	AVC	Core team	5	2018	2023	4th place (2021)
Netherlands	CEV	Core team	5	2018	2023	5th place (2018)
Poland	CEV	Challenger team	5	2018	2023	3rd place (2023)
Serbia	CEV	Core team	5	2018	2023	3rd place (2022)
South Korea	AVC	Core team	5	2018	2023	12th place (2018)
Thailand	AVC	Core team	5	2018	2023	8th place (2022)
Turkey	CEV	Core team	5	2018	2023	Champions (2023)
United States	NORCECA	Core team	5	2018	2023	Champions (2018, 2019, 2021)

== Format ==
=== Preliminary round ===
The format of play is the same as edition 2022's. The new format will see 16 women's teams competing in pools of 8 teams during the pool phase. The participating teams were ranked from 1st to 16th in the FIVB world rankings after the end of the last edition, and each team will play a total of 12 matches during the preliminary round over 3 weeks, against equally strong opponents – 3 matches against teams ranked 1st to 4th, 3 matches against teams ranked 5th to 8th, 3 matches against teams ranked 9th to 12th, and 3 matches against teams ranked 13th to 16th. The eight best teams will then move into the final knockout phase of the competition. However, this rule is only applied if the finals host country advances as part of this group. In this does not happen, the 7 best teams advance.

=== Final round ===
The VNL Finals will see the top eight teams moving directly to the knockout phase which will consist of eight matches in total: four quarterfinals, two semi-finals and the bronze and gold medal matches.

Final 8 direct elimination formula:

- The first ranked team will play a quarterfinal match against the eighth ranked team, the second ranked team will play a quarterfinal match against the seventh ranked team, the third ranked team will play a quarterfinal match against the sixth ranked team, the fourth ranked team will play a quarterfinal match against the fifth ranked team.
- The national team of the hosting territory of the event will have a guaranteed berth for the Final round. If the host nation does not finish in the top eight in Preliminary round, they will replace the eighth place team and play as the eighth seed.

== Pool composition ==
The overview of pools was released on 8 December 2023.

Week 1		Week 2		Week 3	
Pool 1 Turkey	Pool 2 Brazil	Pool 3 Macau, China	Pool 4 United States	Pool 5 Hong Kong, China	Pool 6 Japan
Turkey; Italy; Poland; Japan; Germany; Netherlands; Bulgaria; France	Brazil; United States; Serbia; China; Canada; Dominican Republic; Thailand; South Korea	China; Italy; Brazil; Japan; Dominican Republic; Netherlands; Thailand; France	United States; Turkey; Poland; Serbia; Germany; Canada; Bulgaria; South Korea	China; Turkey; Brazil; Poland; Dominican Republic; Germany; Thailand; Bulgaria	Japan; United States; Italy; Serbia; Netherlands; Canada; France; South Korea

== Venues ==
=== Preliminary round ===
Week 1
Pool 1	Pool 2
Antalya, Turkey	Rio de Janeiro, Brazil
Antalya Sports Hall	Ginásio do Maracanãzinho
Capacity: 10,000	Capacity: 11,800
Week 2
Pool 3	Pool 4
Macau, China	Arlington, Texas, United States
Galaxy Arena	College Park Center
Capacity: 16,000	Capacity: 7,000
Week 3
Pool 5	Pool 6
Hong Kong, China	Fukuoka, Japan
Hong Kong Coliseum	West Japan General Exhibition Center
Capacity: 12,500	Capacity: 7,900

=== Final round ===
All matches
Bangkok, Thailand
Indoor Stadium Huamark
Capacity: 8,000
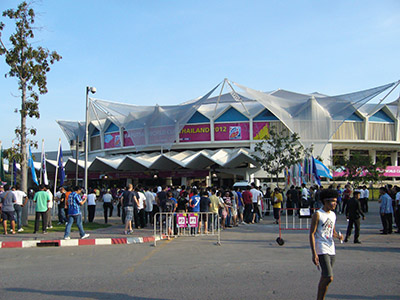

== Competition schedule ==
●	Preliminary round	●	Final round

Week 1 14–19 May	Week 2 28 May–2 Jun	Week 3 11–16 Jun	Week 4 20–23 Jun
32 matches	32 matches	32 matches	8 matches

== Pool standing procedure ==
1. Total number of victories (matches won, matches lost)
2. In the event of a tie, the following first tiebreaker will apply: The teams will be ranked by the most points gained per match as follows:
  - Match won 3–0 or 3–1: 3 points for the winner, 0 points for the loser
  - Match won 3–2: 2 points for the winner, 1 point for the loser
  - Match forfeited: 3 points for the winner, 0 points (0–25, 0–25, 0–25) for the loser
3. If teams are still tied after examining the number of victories and points gained, then the FIVB will examine the results in order to break the tie in the following order:
  - Sets quotient: if two or more teams are tied on the number of points gained, they will be ranked by the quotient resulting from the division of the number of all sets won by the number of all sets lost.
  - Points quotient: if the tie persists based on the sets quotient, the teams will be ranked by the quotient resulting from the division of all points scored by the total of points lost during all sets.
  - If the tie persists based on the points quotient, the tie will be broken based on the team that won the match of the Round Robin Phase between the tied teams. When the tie in points quotient is between three or more teams, these teams ranked taking into consideration only the matches involving the teams in question.

== Preliminary round ==
=== Ranking ===
Pos	Team	Pld	W	L	Pts	SW	SL	SR	SPW	SPL	SPR	Qualification
1	Brazil	12	12	0	34	36	9	4.000	1075	873	1.231	Final round
2	Italy	12	10	2	31	32	10	3.200	1010	812	1.244	Final round
3	Poland	12	10	2	30	31	8	3.875	942	838	1.124	Final round
4	China	12	9	3	26	29	14	2.071	1000	886	1.129	Final round
5	Japan	12	8	4	25	28	16	1.750	1011	909	1.112	Final round
6	Turkey	12	8	4	25	29	18	1.611	1060	977	1.085	Final round
7	United States	12	7	5	22	27	17	1.588	1018	944	1.078	Final round
8	Netherlands	12	7	5	21	24	18	1.333	965	903	1.069	
9	Canada	12	7	5	20	24	19	1.263	975	945	1.032	
10	Dominican Republic	12	3	9	10	15	29	0.517	956	1029	0.929	
11	Serbia	12	3	9	9	16	29	0.552	968	1058	0.915	
12	Germany	12	3	9	9	14	28	0.500	907	974	0.931	
13	Thailand (Note: Qualified as host)	12	3	9	7	12	32	0.375	878	1031	0.852	Final round
14	France	12	2	10	8	10	32	0.313	827	993	0.833	
15	South Korea	12	2	10	6	8	33	0.242	751	970	0.774	
16	Bulgaria	12	2	10	5	11	34	0.324	863	1064	0.811	

Source: VNL 2024 – Women's standings

=== Week 1 ===
==== Pool 1 ====
- All times are Turkey Standard Time (UTC+03:00).

Date	Time		Score		Set 1	Set 2	Set 3	Set 4	Set 5	Total	Report
14 May	17:00	Bulgaria	0–3	Netherlands	14–25	20–25	22–25			56–75	P2 Report
14 May	20:00	Italy	0–3	Poland	26–28	23–25	21–25			70–78	P2 Report
15 May	17:00	France	0–3	Germany	22–25	14–25	22–25			58–75	P2 Report
15 May	20:00	Japan	3–2	Turkey	25–23	25–21	23–25	20–25	15–11	108–105	P2 Report
16 May	14:00	Germany	1–3	Italy	16–25	16–25	25–21	22–25		79–96	P2 Report
16 May	17:00	Bulgaria	0–3	Japan	13–25	15–25	15–25			43–75	P2 Report
16 May	20:00	Netherlands	1–3	Turkey	14–25	25–23	23–25	18–25		80–98	P2 Report
17 May	14:00	Japan	3–0	Germany	25–21	25–15	25–22			75–58	P2 Report
17 May	17:00	France	0–3	Poland	20–25	16–25	17–25			53–75	P2 Report
17 May	20:00	Italy	3–0	Bulgaria	25–11	25–22	25–19			75–52	P2 Report
18 May	14:00	Poland	3–0	Netherlands	25–20	26–24	25–18			76–62	P2 Report
18 May	17:00	France	3–1	Bulgaria	19–25	25–21	25–11	29–27		98–84	P2 Report
18 May	20:00	Italy	3–1	Turkey	25–27	25–21	25–21	25–19		100–88	P2 Report
19 May	14:00	Germany	1–3	Netherlands	21–25	25–21	23–25	20–25		89–96	P2 Report
19 May	17:00	Poland	3–0	Japan	26–24	25–20	25–23			76–67	P2 Report
19 May	20:00	France	0–3	Turkey	19–25	16–25	19–25			54–75	P2 Report

==== Pool 2 ====
- All times are Brasília Time (UTC−03:00).

Date	Time		Score		Set 1	Set 2	Set 3	Set 4	Set 5	Total	Report
14 May	17:30	China	3–0	South Korea	25–15	25–16	25–14			75–45	P2 Report
14 May	21:00	Brazil	3–1	Canada	26–24	23–25	26–24	25–12		100–85	P2 Report
15 May	17:30	United States	3–1	Thailand	25–22	19–25	25–12	25–18		94–77	P2 Report
15 May	21:00	Serbia	1–3	Dominican Republic	18–25	17–25	25–21	20–25		80–96	P2 Report
16 May	14:00	Brazil	3–0	South Korea	25–15	25–19	25–17			75–51	P2 Report
16 May	17:30	China	3–1	United States	23–25	25–23	25–22	25–19		98–89	P2 Report
16 May	21:00	Dominican Republic	0–3	Canada	20–25	21–25	22–25			63–75	P2 Report
17 May	14:00	Serbia	3–0	Thailand	25–13	29–27	25–19			79–59	P2 Report
17 May	17:30	China	1–3	Canada	22–25	25–20	23–25	22–25		92–95	P2 Report
17 May	21:00	Brazil	3–1	United States	25–22	25–16	18–25	25–19		93–82	P2 Report
18 May	14:00	Serbia	1–3	China	25–21	15–25	18–25	18–25		76–96	P2 Report
18 May	17:30	South Korea	0–3	Dominican Republic	13–25	19–25	20–25			52–75	P2 Report
18 May	21:00	Thailand	1–3	Canada	21–25	13–25	25–20	17–25		76–95	P2 Report
19 May	10:00	Brazil	3–0	Serbia	25–15	25–19	25–19			75–53	P2 Report
19 May	14:00	United States	3–0	Dominican Republic	25–23	25–20	25–18			75–61	P2 Report
19 May	17:30	Thailand	1–3	South Korea	19–25	25–23	16–25	18–25		78–98	P2 Report

=== Week 2 ===
==== Pool 3 ====
- All times are Macau Standard Time (UTC+08:00).

Date	Time		Score		Set 1	Set 2	Set 3	Set 4	Set 5	Total	Report
28 May	16:00	Thailand	3–1	Dominican Republic	25–22	20–25	25–17	26–24		96–88	P2 Report
28 May	19:30	Brazil	3–2	Japan	24–26	26–24	19–25	25–20	15–11	109–106	P2 Report
29 May	16:00	Italy	3–0	France	25–15	25–14	25–14			75–43	P2 Report
29 May	19:30	Netherlands	1–3	China	25–21	23–25	23–25	21–25		92–96	P2 Report
30 May	12:30	Dominican Republic	0–3	Italy	12–25	19–25	21–25			52–75	P2 Report
30 May	16:00	France	0–3	Japan	14–25	18–25	15–25			47–75	P2 Report
30 May	19:30	Brazil	3–1	Netherlands	25–17	20–25	25–20	25–18		95–80	P2 Report
31 May	12:30	France	2–3	Thailand	23–25	21–25	25–23	25–20	7–15	101–108	P2 Report
31 May	16:00	Netherlands	3–1	Dominican Republic	25–17	23–25	25–21	25–17		98–80	P2 Report
31 May	19:30	Japan	3–1	China	25–22	19–25	25–18	25–17		94–82	P2 Report
1 Jun	12:30	Brazil	3–2	Italy	26–24	25–27	18–25	25–19	15–10	109–105	P2 Report
1 Jun	16:00	Dominican Republic	1–3	Japan	20–25	25–23	24–26	23–25		92–99	P2 Report
1 Jun	19:30	Thailand	0–3	China	23–25	17–25	18–25			58–75	P2 Report
2 Jun	12:30	France	0–3	Netherlands	17–25	10–25	21–25			48–75	P2 Report
2 Jun	16:00	Brazil	3–0	Thailand	25–22	25–14	25–17			75–53	P2 Report
2 Jun	19:30	Italy	3–0	China	25–23	25–19	25–16			75–58	P2 Report

==== Pool 4 ====
- All times are Central Daylight Time (UTC−05:00).

Date	Time		Score		Set 1	Set 2	Set 3	Set 4	Set 5	Total	Report
28 May	16:00	Poland	3–1	Serbia	25–16	23–25	25–18	25–22		98–81	P2 Report
28 May	19:30	Canada	1–3	United States	22–25	17–25	25–23	20–25		84–98	P2 Report
29 May	11:00	South Korea	2–3	Bulgaria	23–25	25–20	26–24	21–25	13–15	108–109	P2 Report
29 May	14:30	Germany	1–3	Turkey	25–20	20–25	9–25	24–26		78–96	P2 Report
30 May	12:30	South Korea	0–3	Poland	20–25	20–25	10–25			50–75	P2 Report
30 May	16:00	Canada	3–0	Germany	25–20	25–15	25–22			75–57	P2 Report
30 May	19:30	Serbia	1–3	Turkey	18–25	31–33	25–21	21–25		95–104	P2 Report
31 May	13:00	Germany	0–3	Poland	23–25	20–25	21–25			64–75	P2 Report
31 May	16:30	Serbia	3–1	Canada	25–22	21–25	26–24	25–20		97–91	P2 Report
31 May	20:00	Bulgaria	0–3	United States	17–25	22–25	22–25			61–75	P2 Report
1 Jun	13:00	South Korea	0–3	Turkey	20–25	15–25	20–25			55–75	P2 Report
1 Jun	16:30	Poland	3–1	United States	29–27	25–22	20–25	25–23		99–97	P2 Report
1 Jun	20:00	Serbia	3–1	Bulgaria	18–25	25–21	25–17	25–16		93–79	P2 Report
2 Jun	11:30	South Korea	0–3	Canada	15–25	12–25	18–25			45–75	P2 Report
2 Jun	15:00	United States	2–3	Turkey	25–21	20–25	21–25	25–12	12–15	103–98	P2 Report
2 Jun	18:30	Bulgaria	1–3	Germany	19–25	25–21	21–25	11–25		76–96	P2 Report

=== Week 3 ===
==== Pool 5 ====
- All times are Hong Kong Time (UTC+08:00).

Date	Time		Score		Set 1	Set 2	Set 3	Set 4	Set 5	Total	Report
11 Jun	17:00	Germany	1–3	Dominican Republic	24–26	25–21	21–25	21–25		91–97	P2 Report
11 Jun	20:30	Bulgaria	0–3	China	15–25	12–25	17–25			44–75	P2 Report
12 Jun	17:00	Turkey	3–0	Thailand	25–17	25–17	25–17			75–51	P2 Report
12 Jun	20:30	Brazil	3–1	Poland	22–25	25–17	25–17	25–16		97–75	P2 Report
13 Jun	13:30	Bulgaria	2–3	Thailand	23–25	25–22	18–25	25–22	10–15	101–109	P2 Report
13 Jun	17:00	Germany	1–3	Brazil	20–25	22–25	25–21	24–26		91–97	P2 Report
13 Jun	20:30	Dominican Republic	1–3	Turkey	25–17	15–25	17–25	18–25		75–92	P2 Report
14 Jun	13:30	Bulgaria	0–3	Brazil	11–25	11–25	23–25			45–75	P2 Report
14 Jun	17:00	Dominican Republic	0–3	Poland	31–33	20–25	16–25			67–83	P2 Report
14 Jun	20:30	China	3–0	Germany	25–19	25–17	25–18			75–54	P2 Report
15 Jun	13:30	Dominican Republic	2–3	Bulgaria	26–24	23–25	22–25	26–24	13–15	110–113	P2 Report
15 Jun	17:00	Poland	3–0	Thailand	25–15	25–23	25–17			75–55	P2 Report
15 Jun	20:30	China	3–2	Turkey	21–25	17–25	25–21	25–23	15–13	103–107	P2 Report
16 Jun	13:30	Germany	3–0	Thailand	25–17	25–21	25–20			75–58	P2 Report
16 Jun	17:00	Turkey	0–3	Brazil	14–25	14–25	19–25			47–75	P2 Report
16 Jun	20:30	China	3–0	Poland	25–23	25–15	25–19			75–57	P2 Report

==== Pool 6 ====
- All times are Japan Standard Time (UTC+09:00).

Date	Time		Score		Set 1	Set 2	Set 3	Set 4	Set 5	Total	Report
11 Jun	15:30	United States	3–0	France	25–15	26–24	25–20			76–59	P2 Report
11 Jun	19:20	Italy	3–0	Canada	25–16	25–15	25–14			75–45	P2 Report
12 Jun	15:30	Netherlands	3–1	Serbia	25–20	25–21	18–25	25–12		93–78	P2 Report
12 Jun	19:20	South Korea	0–3	Japan	16–25	16–25	23–25			55–75	P2 Report
13 Jun	12:00	Netherlands	0–3	United States	21–25	20–25	22–25			63–75	P2 Report
13 Jun	15:30	France	2–3	South Korea	23–25	25–21	25–17	22–25	13–15	108–103	P2 Report
13 Jun	19:20	Japan	2–3	Canada	25–23	25–22	20–25	21–25	14–16	105–111	P2 Report
14 Jun	12:00	Serbia	1–3	France	22–25	25–22	23–25	21–25		91–97	P2 Report
14 Jun	15:30	Canada	0–3	Netherlands	24–26	16–25	23–25			63–76	P2 Report
14 Jun	19:30	Italy	3–0	South Korea	25–16	25–11	25–13			75–40	P2 Report
15 Jun	12:00	Canada	3–0	France	25–14	25–18	31–29			81–61	P2 Report
15 Jun	15:30	Italy	3–1	United States	25–17	19–25	25–15	25–21		94–78	P2 Report
15 Jun	19:20	Japan	3–0	Serbia	25–22	25–18	25–15			75–55	P2 Report
16 Jun	11:30	Netherlands	3–0	South Korea	25–21	25–11	25–17			75–49	P2 Report
16 Jun	15:00	Serbia	1–3	Italy	20–25	25–20	23–25	22–25		90–95	P2 Report
16 Jun	18:45	Japan	0–3	United States	15–25	18–25	24–26			57–76	P2 Report

== Final round ==
- All times are Thailand Standard Time (UTC+07:00).

Quarter-finals
20 June
Thailand	0
Brazil	3
20 June
China	0
Japan	3
21 June
Italy	3
United States	0
21 June
Poland	3
Turkey	2

Semi-finals
22 June
Brazil	2
Japan	3
22 June
Italy	3
Poland	0

Final
23 June
Japan	1
Italy	3
Third place match
23 June
Brazil	2
Poland	3

=== Quarter-finals ===
Date	Time		Score		Set 1	Set 2	Set 3	Set 4	Set 5	Total	Report
20 Jun	17:00	China	0–3	Japan	21–25	21–25	22–25			64–75	P2 Report
20 Jun	20:30	Thailand	0–3	Brazil	21–25	20–25	23–25			64–75	P2 Report
21 Jun	17:00	Italy	3–0	United States	25–21	25–21	25–23			75–65	P2 Report
21 Jun	20:30	Poland	3–2	Turkey	20–25	25–22	25–20	19–25	15–11	104–103	P2 Report

=== Semi-finals ===
Date	Time		Score		Set 1	Set 2	Set 3	Set 4	Set 5	Total	Report
22 Jun	17:00	Italy	3–0	Poland	25–18	25–17	25–12			75–47	P2 Report
22 Jun	20:30	Brazil	2–3	Japan	24–26	25–20	21–25	25–22	12–15	107–108	P2 Report

=== Third place match ===
Date	Time		Score		Set 1	Set 2	Set 3	Set 4	Set 5	Total	Report
23 Jun	17:00	Brazil	2–3	Poland	21–25	28–26	21–25	25–19	9–15	104–110	P2 Report

=== Final ===
Date	Time		Score		Set 1	Set 2	Set 3	Set 4	Set 5	Total	Report
23 Jun	20:30	Japan	1–3	Italy	17–25	17–25	25–21	20–25		79–96	P2 Report

== Final standing ==
Rank	Team
1st place, gold medalist(s)	Italy
2nd place, silver medalist(s)	Japan
3rd place, bronze medalist(s)	Poland
4	Brazil
5	China
6	Turkey
7	United States
8	Thailand
9	Netherlands
10	Canada
11	Dominican Republic
12	Serbia
13	Germany
14	France
15	South Korea
16	Bulgaria

Source: VNL 2024 final standings

2024 Women's VNL champions

Italy
Second title

14–woman roster
Marina Lubian, Alice Degradi, Carlotta Cambi, Ilaria Spirito, Monica De Gennaro, Alessia Orro, Caterina Bosetti, Anna Danesi (c), Sara Bonifacio, Myriam Sylla, Paola Egonu, Sarah Luisa Fahr, Ekaterina Antropova, Gaia Giovannini
Head coach
Julio Velasco

== Awards ==
- Most valuable player
  (Italy) Paola Egonu
- Best setter
  (Italy) Alessia Orro
- Best outside spikers
  (Japan) Sarina Koga
  (Italy) Myriam Sylla
- Best middle blocker
  (Poland) Agnieszka Korneluk
  (Italy) Sarah Luisa Fahr
- Best opposite spiker
  (Italy) Paola Egonu
- Best libero
  (Japan) Manami Kojima
- Fair play team award
  Dominican Republic

== Statistics leaders ==
=== Preliminary round ===
Statistics leaders correct at the end of preliminary round.

Best Scorers (Note: Best scorers determined by scored points from spike, block and serve.)
	Player	Attacks	Blocks	Serves	Total
1	(Turkey) Melissa Vargas	246	25	22	293
2	(Japan) Sarina Koga	252	7	13	272
3	(Brazil) Gabriela Guimarães	224	13	12	249
4	(Canada) Kiera Van Ryk	212	12	12	236
5	(Poland) Magdalena Stysiak	194	26	8	228

Best Attackers (Note: Best attackers determined by successful spikes.)
	Player	Spikes	Faults	Shots	%	Total
1	(Turkey) Melissa Vargas	162	44	110	51.27	316
2	(Japan) Sarina Koga	159	32	197	40.98	388
3	(Canada) Kiera Van Ryk	148	71	135	41.81	354
4	(China) Li Yingying	147	36	133	46.52	316
5	(Canada) Alexa Gray	137	41	178	38.48	356

Best Blockers (Note: Best blockers determined by the stuff blocks, faults and rebounds.)
	Player	Blocks	Faults	Rebounds	Avg	Total
1	(Serbia) Hena Kurtagić	33	39	57	4.12	129
2	(Brazil) Ana Carolina da Silva	25	16	28	2.50	69
3	(Canada) Emily Maglio	23	43	58	2.56	124
4	(Italy) Anna Danesi	21	24	35	2.33	80
4	(China) Wang Yuanyuan	21	25	52	2.33	98

Best Servers (Note: Best servers determined by aces, faults and hits.)
	Player	Aces	Faults	Hits	Avg	Total
1	(Germany) Camilla Weitzel	16	12	101	1.78	129
2	(Turkey) Melissa Vargas	12	13	77	1.50	102
3	(Thailand) Chatchu-on Moksri	11	18	81	1.38	110
3	(Italy) Paola Egonu	11	10	32	2.20	53
3	(Bulgaria) Merelin Nikolova	11	11	41	2.20	43

Best Setters (Note: Best setters determined by running setts, faults and still sets.)
	Player	Running	Faults	Still	Avg	Total
1	(China) Diao Linyu	219	6	553	24.33	778
2	(Germany) Pia Kästner	215	9	484	26.88	708
3	(South Korea) Kim Da-in	210	9	488	23.33	707
4	(Japan) Koyomi Iwasaki	205	9	604	22.78	818
5	(Canada) Brie King	195	9	670	21.67	874

Best Diggers (Note: Best diggers determined by successful digs, faults and receptions.)
	Player	Digs	Faults	Receptions	Avg	Total
1	(Canada) Kiera Van Ryk	113	34	13	12.56	160
2	(China) Wang Mengjie	106	35	14	11.78	155
3	(Japan) Kotona Hayashi	102	25	14	11.33	141
4	(Japan) Sarina Koga	101	15	14	11.22	130
5	(Germany) Anna Pogany	100	39	16	11.11	155

Best Receivers (Note: Best receivers determined by efficient receptions, faults and serve receptions.)
	Player	Excellents	Faults	Serve	%	Total
1	(Germany) Lena Stigrot	66	17	177	7.33	260
1	(Thailand) Chatchu-on Moksri	66	12	151	8.25	229
3	(Japan) Kotona Hayashi	63	8	92	7.00	163
4	(Germany) Lina Alsmeier	61	18	169	6.78	248
5	(Poland) Martyna Łukasik	50	12	121	5.00	183

=== Final round ===
Statistics leaders correct at the end of final round.

Best Scorers
	Player	Attacks	Blocks	Serves	Total
1	(Italy) Paola Egonu	59	8	2	69
2	(Brazil) Gabriela Guimarães	55	2	2	59
3	(Japan) Sarina Koga	55	0	2	57
4	(Poland) Magdalena Stysiak	39	7	2	48
5	(Poland) Martyna Łukasik	38	4	2	44

Best Attackers
	Player	Spikes	Faults	Shots	%	Total
1	(Italy) Paola Egonu	59	5	51	51.30	115
2	(Japan) Sarina Koga	55	16	79	36.67	150
2	(Brazil) Gabriela Guimarães	55	15	66	40.44	136
4	(Poland) Magdalena Stysiak	39	29	41	35.78	109
5	(Poland) Martyna Łukasik	38	19	33	42.22	90

Best Blockers
	Player	Blocks	Faults	Rebounds	Avg	Total
1	(Brazil) Ana Carolina da Silva	17	23	22	5.67	62
2	(Poland) Agnieszka Korneluk	12	16	16	4.00	44
3	(Brazil) Thaísa Menezes	10	13	19	3.33	42
4	(Italy) Paola Egonu	8	9	12	2.67	29
4	(Italy) Sarah Fahr	8	21	30	2.67	59

Best Servers
	Player	Aces	Faults	Hits	Avg	Total
1	(Poland) Agnieszka Korneluk	6	5	34	2.00	45
2	(Japan) Koyomi Iwasaki	3	3	41	1.00	47
2	(Japan) Nichika Yamada	3	3	44	1.00	50
2	(Brazil) Ana Carolina da Silva	3	5	37	1.00	45
2	(Turkey) Melissa Vargas	3	3	15	3.00	21

Best Setters
	Player	Running	Faults	Still	Avg	Total
1	(Poland) Joanna Wołosz	51	0	295	17.00	205
2	(Japan) Koyomi Iwasaki	39	2	292	13.00	333
3	(Brazil) Macris Carneiro	34	1	119	11.33	154
3	(Italy) Alessia Orro	34	0	185	11.33	219
5	(Brazil) Roberta Ratzke	32	1	165	10.67	198

Best Diggers
	Player	Digs	Faults	Receptions	Avg	Total
1	(Brazil) Nyeme Costa	47	12	8	15.67	67
2	(Italy) Monica De Gennaro	44	7	2	14.67	53
3	(Japan) Sarina Koga	36	9	6	12.00	51
4	(Italy) Alessia Orro	35	6	3	11.67	44
5	(Japan) Koyomi Iwasaki	33	6	2	11.00	41
5	(Poland) Aleksandra Szczygłowska	33	11	7	11.00	51

Best Receivers
	Player	Excellents	Faults	Serve	%	Total
1	(Brazil) Gabriela Guimarães	36	2	47	42.35	85
2	(Poland) Martyna Łukasik	22	4	67	23.66	93
3	(Japan) Sarina Koga	19	1	47	28.36	67
4	(Japan) Mayu Ishikawa	18	5	57	22.50	80
5	(Brazil) Júlia Bergmann	17	3	52	23.61	72

== See also ==
- 2024 FIVB Women's Volleyball Challenger Cup
- 2024 FIVB Volleyball Girls' U17 World Championship
- Volleyball at the 2024 Summer Olympics
