= Maria Stenzel =

Polish volleyball player (born 1996)

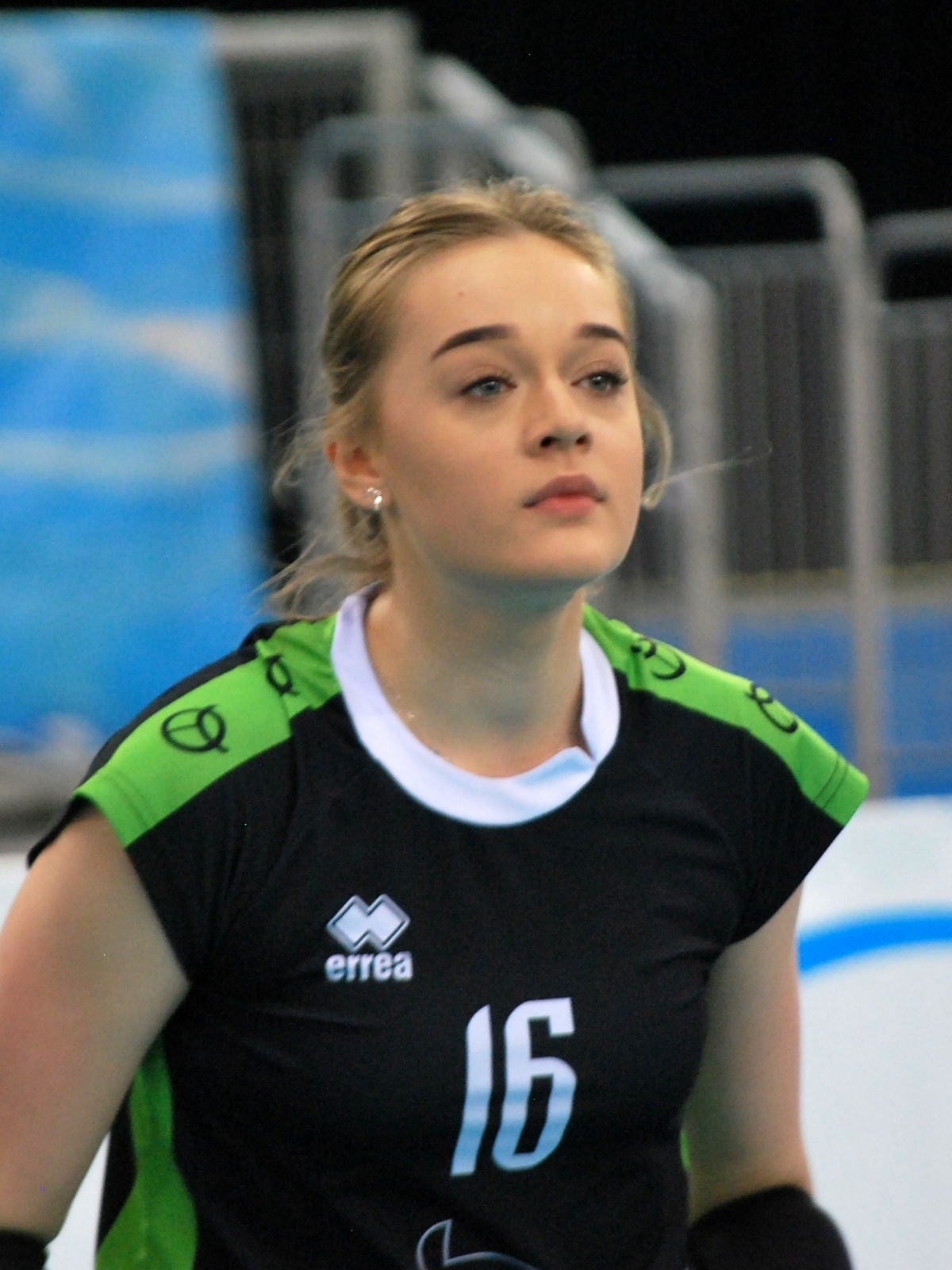

Personal information
- Nationality: Polish
- Born: 25 November 1998 (age 27); Kościan, Poland
- Height: 168 cm (5 ft 6 in)
- Weight: 63 kg (139 lb)
- Spike: 278 cm (109 in)
- Block: 262 cm (103 in)

Volleyball information
- Position: Libero
- Number: 1 (national team)

Career
Years	Teams
2018-	Grot Budowlani Łódź

National team
2015-	Poland
Honours
Women's volleyball
Representing Poland
FIVB Nations League
Bronze medal – third place	2023 Arlington	Team
Bronze medal – third place	2024 Bangkok	Team

Maria Stenzel (born 25 November 1998) is a Polish volleyball player. She is part of the Poland women's national volleyball team.

She participated in the 2015 FIVB Volleyball Girls' U18 World Championship, 2017 FIVB Volleyball Women's U20 World Championship, and 2018 FIVB Volleyball Women's Nations League. On club level she played for Grot Budowlani Łódź.
