= Gizem Örge =

Turkish volleyball player (born 1993)

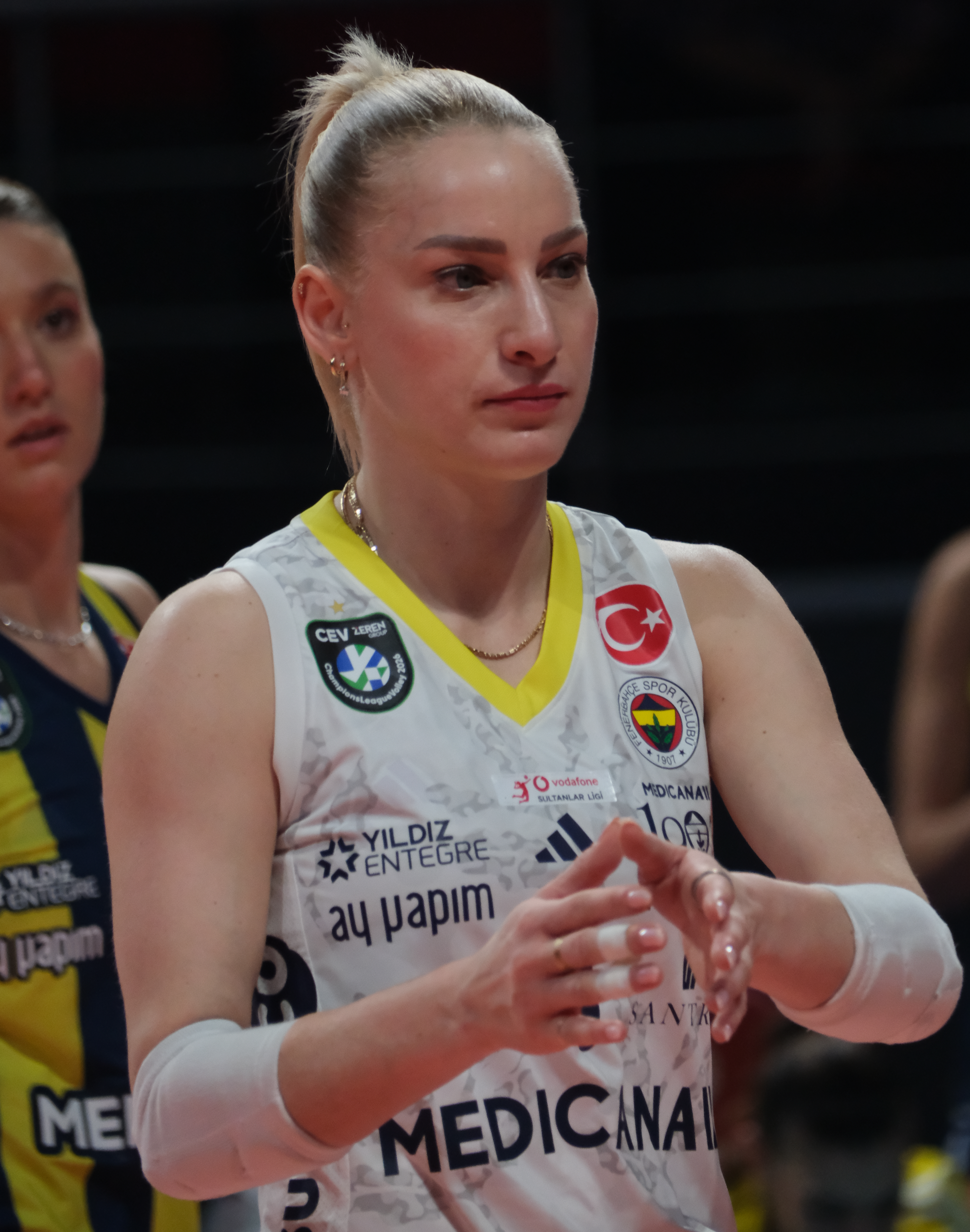
- Örge in 2026

Personal information
- Nationality: Turkish
- Born: 26 April 1993 (age 33) Ankara, Turkey
- Height: 1.70 m (5 ft 7 in)
- Weight: 59 kg (130 lb)
- Spike: 270 cm (106 in)
- Block: 260 cm (102 in)

Volleyball information
- Position: Libero
- Current club: Fenerbahçe
- Number: 1

Career
- Years: Team
- 2006–2008; 2008–2012; 2012–2021; 2021–: Ankara Eczacı Spor; Nilüfer Belediyespor; Vakıfbank; Fenerbahçe

National team
- Years: Team
- Turkey
Honours
Women's volleyball
Representing Turkey
FIVB World Championship
Silver medal – second place	2025 Thailand	Team
FIVB Nations League
Gold medal – first place	2023 Arlington	Team
Gold medal – first place	2026 Macau	Team
Silver medal – second place	2018 Nanjing	Team
European Championship
Gold medal – first place	2023 Belgium/Italy/Estonia/Germany	Team
Gold medal – first place	2026 Azerbaijan/Czech Republic/Sweden/Turkey	Team
Bronze medal – third place	2017 Azerbaijan/Georgia	Team
European League
Gold medal – first place	2014 Germany/Turkey	Team
U23 World Championship
Silver medal – second place	2015 Ankara	Team

Gizem Örge (Turkish pronunciation: [ɟizɛm œɾ̞ˈɟɛ]; born 26 April 1993) is a Turkish volleyball player. Currently, she plays in the Turkish Women's Volleyball League for Fenerbahçe as libero. She was part of the Turkey women's national volleyball team, which became champion at the 2014 Women's European Volleyball League. She was also part of the Turkish national team that won the 2023 FIVB Women's Volleyball Nations League and the 2023 Women's European Volleyball Championship. At the 2023 Nations League, Örge was named Best Libero of the tournament.

== Personal life ==
Örge is a student of physical education and sports at Marmara University. On 31 July 2017, she married actor Cavit Çetin Güner and they divorced 23 September 2019.

== Career ==
=== Clubs ===
She began her sports career in her hometown Ankara. After obtaining her license, she played in the girls' team of Ankara Eczacı Spor that became runner-up in the Turkish Championship. Then, she was admitted to the women's team, and enjoyed her team's promotion to the Turkish Women's Volleyball Second League. Örge initially played as an outside hitter before switching to the libero position during her youth career. She later recalled that the opportunity to represent Turkey at youth level influenced her decision to specialize as a libero. At the age of 15, she moved from Ankara to Bursa to continue her development with Nilüfer Belediyespor, where she gained regular first-team experience over the following four seasons.

Still a high school student, Örge transferred to Nilüfer Belediyespor in Bursa in the 2008–09 season. After her transfer to Vakıfbank, she was loaned out to Nilüfer Belediyespor.

In the 2013–14 season, she joined Vakıfbank team, and successfully replaced the team's injured libero Gizem Güreşen Karadayı. She won the champion title in the 2013–14 Turkish Women's Volleyball League season with Vakıfbank, and became runner-up in the 2013–14 CEV Women's Champions League. During her eight seasons with VakıfBank, Örge won three FIVB Women's Club World Championship titles, two CEV Women's Champions League titles, five Turkish League championships, three Turkish Cups and three Turkish Super Cups. She also received several individual distinctions as a libero during this period, including awards in domestic and international competitions.

In the 2021–22 season, she transferred to Fenerbahçe. With Fenerbahçe, Örge won consecutive Turkish Women's Volleyball League titles in the 2022–23 and 2023–24 seasons. In April 2024, she helped the club defeat Eczacıbaşı in the league final series and was named Best Libero of the 2023–24 Sultanlar Ligi season. Fenerbahçe also completed the 2023–24 season with the Turkish Cup title.

In May 2024, Fenerbahçe announced an extension of Örge's contract covering the 2024–25 and 2025–26 seasons.

=== National team ===
She was member of the Turkey women's national volleyball team, which won the 2014 Women's European Volleyball League.

== Awards ==
=== National team ===
- 2014 Women's European Volleyball League - Gold medal
- 2015 FIVB Volleyball Women's U23 World Championship - Silver medal
- 2017 European Championship – Bronze medal
- 2018 Nations League - Silver medal
- 2023 Nations League - Gold medal
- 2023 European Championship – Gold medal
- 2025 FIVB World Championship Silver medal
- 2026 Nations League - Gold medal
- 2026 European Championship - Gold medal

=== Clubs ===
- 2013–14 Turkish Women's Volleyball League - Champion, with Vakıfbank
- 2013–14 CEV Women's Champions League - Runner-up, with Vakıfbank
- 2013–14 Turkish Cup – Champion, with Vakıfbank
- 2014–15 Turkish Cup – Runner-up, with Vakıfbank
- 2015–16 CEV Women's Champions League - Runner-up, with Vakıfbank
- 2016–17 CEV Women's Champions League - Champion, with Vakıfbank
- 2016–17 Turkish Cup – Runner-up, with Vakıfbank
- 2017 Club World Championship - Champion, with Vakıfbank
- 2017–18 CEV Women's Champions League - Champion, with Vakıfbank
- 2017–18 Turkish Cup – Champion, with Vakıfbank
- 2018 Club World Championship - Champion, with Vakıfbank
- 2020–21 CEV Women's Champions League - Runner-up, with Vakıfbank
- 2020–21 Turkish Cup – Champion, with Vakıfbank
- 2020–21 Turkish Women's Volleyball League – Champion, with Vakıfbank
- 2021–22 Turkish Women's Volleyball League – Runner-up, with Fenerbahçe
- 2021–22 Turkish Cup – Runner-up, with Fenerbahçe
- 2022 Turkish Super Cup - Champion, with Fenerbahçe
- 2022–23 Turkish Cup – Runner-up, with Fenerbahçe
- 2022–23 Turkish Volleyball League Champion, with Fenerbahçe Opet
- 2023–24 Turkish Volleyball Cup Champion, with Fenerbahçe Opet
- 2023–24 Turkish Volleyball League Champion, with Fenerbahçe Opet
- 2024 Turkish Super Cup - Champion, with Fenerbahçe Medicana
- 2024–25 Turkish Volleyball Cup Champion, with Fenerbahçe Medicana
- 2025 Turkish Super Cup - Champion, with Fenerbahçe Medicana

=== Individual ===
- 2015 U23 World Championship "Best Libero"
- 2017-18 CEV Champions League "Best Libero"
- 2018 Club World Championship "Best Libero"
- 2023 FIVB Nations League - "Best Libero"
- 2023 FIVB Women's Volleyball Nations League – "Best Liberor"
- 2026 FIVB Women's Volleyball Nations League – "Best Liberor"

== See also ==
- Turkish women in sports

Awards
Preceded by (Italy) Monica De Gennaro	Best Libero of CEV Champions League; 2017-2018	Succeeded by Not awarded
Preceded by (Serbia) Silvija Popović	Best Libero of FIVB Club World Championship; 2018	Succeeded by (Turkey) Simge Şebnem Aköz
Preceded by (Italy) Monica De Gennaro	Best Libero of FIVB Nations League; 2023	Succeeded by (Japan) Manami Kojima
Preceded by (Italy) Monica De Gennaro	Best Libero of European Volleyball Championship; 2023; 2026	Succeeded by TBD
