= Martyna Łukasik =

Polish volleyball player (born 1999)

Personal information
- Nationality: Polish
- Born: 26 November 1999 (age 26) Gdańsk, Poland
- Height: 189 cm (6 ft 2 in)
- Weight: 75 kg (165 lb)
- Spike: 315 cm (124 in)
- Block: 288 cm (113 in)

Volleyball information
- Position: Outside Hitter
- Number: 18 (club); 11 (national team)

Career
- Years: Team
- 2016–2017: (Poland) Trefl Sopot
- 2017–2018: (Poland) Trefl Proxima Kraków
- 2018–2024: (Poland) Chemik Police
- 2024–: (Italy) Imoco Volley
- 2025–2026: (Turkey) → Galatasaray

National team
- Years: Team
- 2017–: Poland
Medal record
Volleyball
| Bronze medal – third place | 2023 Arlington | Team |
| Bronze medal – third place | 2024 Bangkok | Team |
| Bronze medal – third place | 2025 Łódź | Team |

Martyna Łukasik (born 26 November 1999) is a Polish volleyball player and part of the Poland women's national volleyball team.

== Club career ==
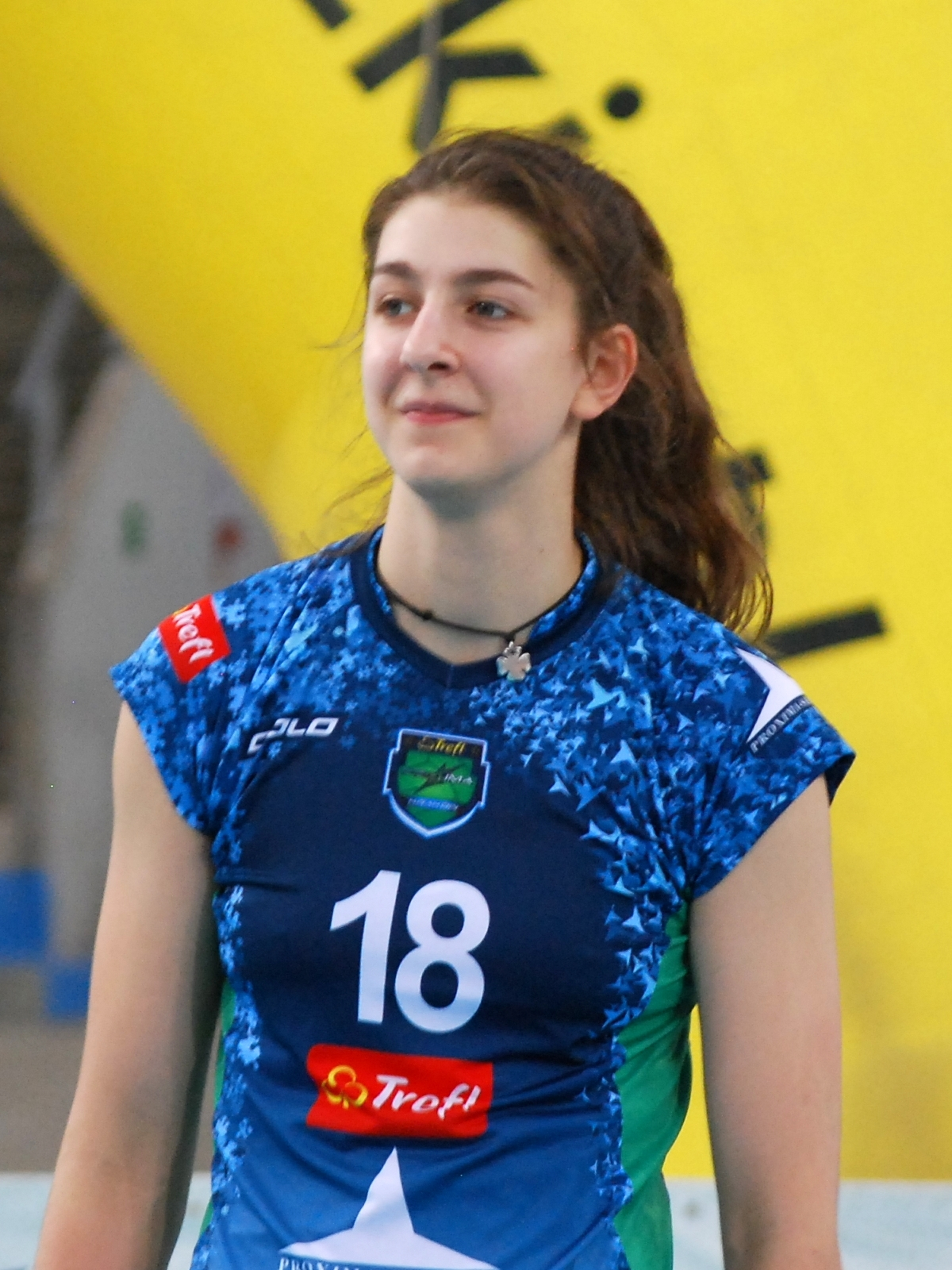
Łukasik in 2017

Łukasik made her debut in volleyball with Gedania Gdańsk U20 in 2012. She started her senior career with Atom Trefl Sopot in 2016/2017 season, moving to Trefl Proxima Kraków for the 2017/18 season. She played for KPS Chemik Police afterward from 2018 to 2024. There she and her team won numerous tournaments, namely the Polish Cup and Polish Super Cup. Łukasik started her career off as an Opposite Spiker but soon changed to Outside Hitter by 2021. Łukasik won MVP tournament award in 2023/24 Polish Super Cup, MVP in 2018/19 Polish Cup, a best Outside Hitter award and best Opposite award playing in Poland.

She left the Tauron Liga in the 2024/25 season, signing with Italian team Imoco Volley, a valued member of the team helping them win the FIVB Volleyball Women's Club World Championship, Women's CEV Champions League, Serie A1, Italian Cup and Italian Super Cup.

On June 30, 2025, she signed a 1-year loan contract with Galatasaray, one of the Sultanlar Ligi teams. On February 23, 2026, Galatasaray and Łukasik announced that they had parted ways by mutual agreement.

On July 3, 2026, Łukasik signed with Japanese SV League team Saga Hisamitsu Springs. But due to a shoulder injury sustained in national team season, the contract was cancelled by mutual agreement.

== International career ==
Łukasik participated in the 2017 FIVB Volleyball Women's U20 World Championship, 2018 Montreux Volley Masters and 2018 FIVB Volleyball Women's Nations League.

Łukasik is the 2023 FIVB Nations League "Best Outside Spiker".

== Personal life ==
Her older sister Justyna also plays volleyball.

== Awards and individual honors ==
=== Club ===
- 2024 Club World Championship – Champion, with Imoco Volley Conegliano
- 2024–25 CEV Champions League – Champion, with Imoco Volley
