= 2023 FIVB Women's Volleyball Nations League =

Tournament details
- Host country: United States
- City: Arlington, Texas (final round)
- Dates: 30 May – 16 July
- Teams: 16 (from 4 confederations)
- Venue: 7 (in 7 host cities)

Final positions
- Champions: Turkey (1st title)
- Runners-up: China
- Third place: Poland
- Fourth place: United States
- Relegated: Croatia

Tournament awards
- MVP: (Turkey) Melissa Vargas
- Best Setter: (China) Diao Linyu
- Best OH: (China) Li Yingying; (Poland) Martyna Łukasik
- Best MB: (Turkey) Zehra Güneş; (China) Yuan Xinyue
- Best OPP: (Turkey) Melissa Vargas
- Best Libero: (Turkey) Gizem Örge

Tournament statistics
- Matches played: 104
- Attendance: 344,618 (3,314 per match)

The 2023 FIVB Women's Volleyball Nations League was the fifth edition of the FIVB Women's Volleyball Nations League, an annual Women's international volleyball tournament. It was held between May and July 2023, and the final round took place at the College Park Center in Arlington, Texas, United States.

Following the results of 2022 Nations League and 2022 Challenger Cup, Belgium were replaced by debutants Croatia in this edition.

Turkey claimed their first VNL title after defeating China in the final. China took the silver medal, which was their best result in this tournament. Poland won their first medal of the tournament, claiming the bronze after defeating finals hosts the United States in the third place match. Melissa Vargas of Turkey named as the MVP of the tournament.

== Teams ==
=== Qualification ===
Sixteen teams qualified for the competition. Eleven of them qualified as core teams which cannot face relegation. Five other teams were selected as challenger teams which could be relegated from the tournament. Croatia replaced Belgium after winning the 2022 Challenger Cup.

Country	Confederation	Designation	Previous appearances			Previous best performance
Country	Confederation	Designation	Total	First	Last	Previous best performance
Brazil	CSV	Core team	4	2018	2022	Runners-up (2019, 2021, 2022)
Bulgaria	CEV	Challenger team	2	2019	2022	14th place (2022)
Canada	NORCECA	Challenger team	2	2021	2022	12th place (2022)
China	AVC	Core team	4	2018	2022	3rd place (2018, 2019)
Croatia	CEV	Challenger team	0	None		Debut
Dominican Republic	NORCECA	Challenger team	4	2018	2022	6th place (2021)
Germany	CEV	Core team	4	2018	2022	10th place (2019, 2021, 2022)
Italy	CEV	Core team	4	2018	2022	Champions (2022)
Japan	AVC	Core team	4	2018	2022	4th place (2021)
Netherlands	CEV	Core team	4	2018	2022	5th place (2018)
Poland	CEV	Challenger team	4	2018	2022	5th place (2019)
Serbia	CEV	Core team	4	2018	2022	3rd place (2022)
South Korea	AVC	Core team	4	2018	2022	12th place (2018)
Thailand	AVC	Core team	4	2018	2022	8th place (2022)
Turkey	CEV	Core team	4	2018	2022	Runners-up (2018)
United States	NORCECA	Core team	4	2018	2022	Champions (2018, 2019, 2021)

== Format ==
=== Preliminary round ===
The format of play is the same as edition 2022. The new format will see 16 women's teams competing in pools of 8 teams during the pool phase. Each team plays 12 matches during the pool stage. Eight teams will then move into the final knockout phase of the competition.

=== Final round ===
The VNL Finals will see the top eight teams moving directly to the knockout phase which will consist of eight matches in total: four quarterfinals, two semi-finals and the bronze and gold medal matches.

Final 8 direct elimination formula:

- The first ranked team will play a quarterfinal match against the eighth ranked team, the second ranked team will play a quarterfinal match against the seventh ranked team, the third ranked team will play a quarterfinal match against the sixth ranked team, the fourth ranked team will play a quarterfinal match against the fifth ranked team.
- The national team of the hosting territory of the event will have a guaranteed berth for the Final round. If the host nation does not finish in the top eight in Preliminary round, they will replace the eighth place team and play as the eighth seed.

== Pool composition ==
The overview of pools was released on 11 November 2022.

Week 1		Week 2		Week 3	
Pool 1 Turkey	Pool 2 Japan	Pool 3 Hong Kong, China	Pool 4 Brazil	Pool 5 South Korea	Pool 6 Thailand
Turkey; Canada; Italy; Poland; South Korea; Serbia; Thailand; United States	Japan; Brazil; Bulgaria; China; Croatia; Dominican Republic; Germany; Netherlands	China; Bulgaria; Canada; Dominican Republic; Italy; Netherlands; Poland; Turkey	Brazil; Croatia; Germany; Japan; South Korea; Serbia; Thailand; United States	South Korea; Bulgaria; China; Dominican Republic; Germany; Poland; Serbia; United States	Thailand; Brazil; Canada; Croatia; Italy; Japan; Netherlands; Turkey

== Venues ==
=== Preliminary round ===
Week 1
Pool 1	Pool 2
Antalya, Turkey	Nagoya, Japan
Antalya Sports Hall	Nippon Gaishi Hall
Capacity: 10,000	Capacity: 10,000
Week 2
Pool 3	Pool 4
Hong Kong, China	Brasília, Brazil
Hong Kong Coliseum	Nilson Nelson Gymnasium
Capacity: 12,500	Capacity: 11,105
Week 3
Pool 5	Pool 6
Suwon, South Korea	Bangkok, Thailand
Chilbo Gymnasium	Indoor Stadium Huamark
Capacity: 4,407	Capacity: 8,000

=== Final round ===
All matches
Arlington, Texas, USA
College Park Center
Capacity: 7,000
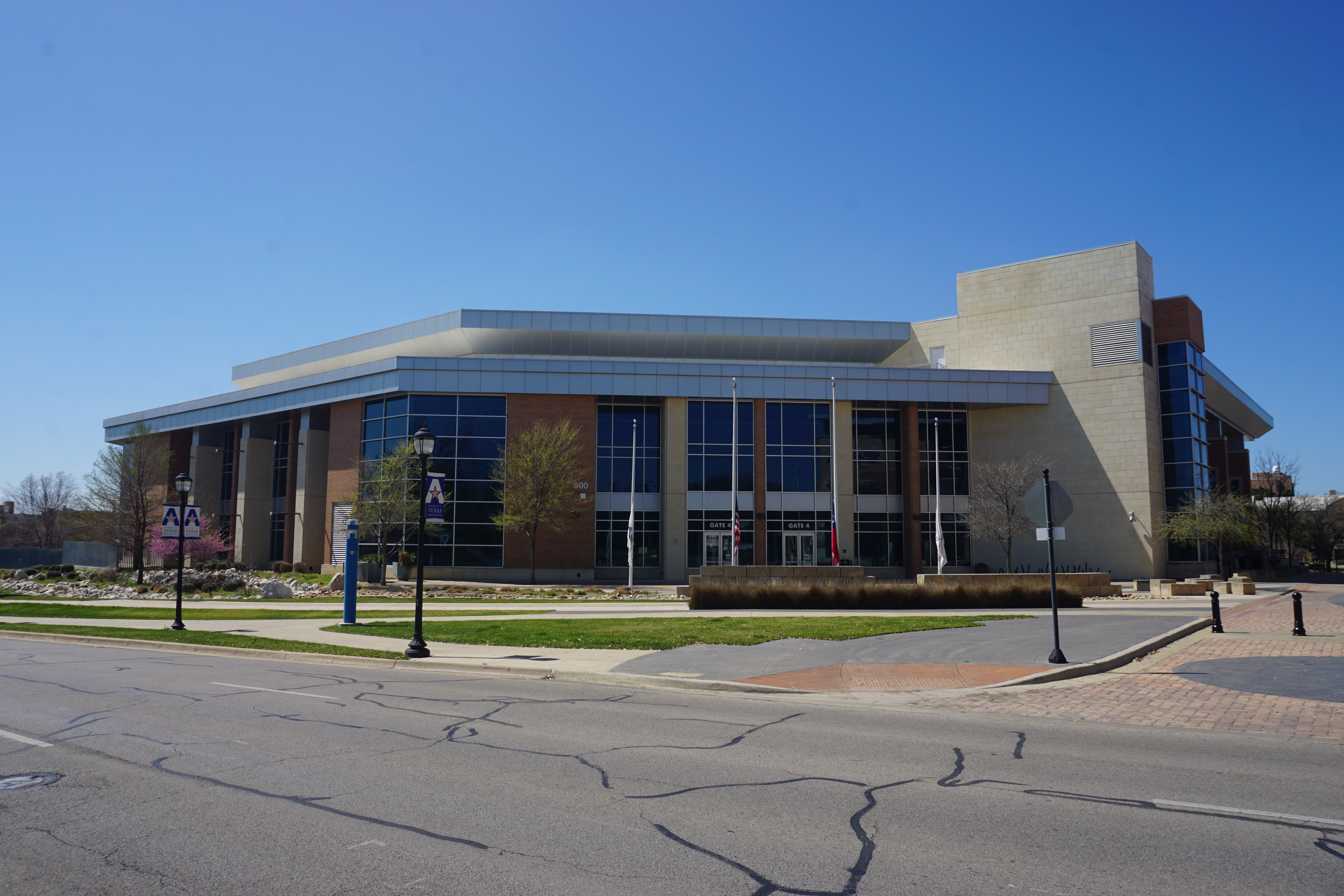

== Competition schedule ==
●	Preliminary round	●	Final round

Week 1 30 May – 4 Jun	Week 2 13–18 Jun	Week 3 27 Jun – 2 Jul	Week 4 12–16 Jul
32 matches	32 matches	32 matches	8 matches

== Pool standing procedure ==
Advancement out of pool play is decided by the following:

- Total number of victories (matches won, matches lost)

In the event of a tie, the following first tiebreaker will apply:

- The teams will be ranked by the most points gained per match as follows:
  - Match won 3–0 or 3–1: 3 points for the winner, 0 points for the loser
  - Match won 3–2: 2 points for the winner, 1 point for the loser
  - Match forfeited: 3 points for the winner, 0 points (0–25, 0–25, 0–25) for the loser
- If teams are still tied after examining the number of victories and points gained, then the FIVB will examine the results in order to break the tie in the following order:
1. Sets quotient: if two or more teams are tied on the number of points gained, they will be ranked by the quotient resulting from the division of the number of all sets won by the number of all sets lost.
2. Points quotient: if the tie persists based on the sets quotient, the teams will be ranked by the quotient resulting from the division of all points scored by the total of points lost during all sets.
3. If the tie persists based on the points quotient, the tie will be broken based on the team that won the match of the Round Robin Phase between the tied teams. When the tie in points quotient is between three or more teams, these teams ranked taking into consideration only the matches involving the teams in question.

== Preliminary round ==
=== Ranking ===
Pos	Team	Pld	W	L	Pts	SW	SL	SR	SPW	SPL	SPR	Qualification or relegation
1	Poland	12	10	2	29	32	13	2.462	1069	962	1.111	Final round
2	United States (Note: Qualified as hosts)	12	10	2	28	34	16	2.125	1099	1004	1.095	Final round
3	Turkey	12	9	3	29	31	11	2.818	1008	850	1.186	Final round
4	Brazil	12	8	4	24	28	18	1.556	1065	987	1.079	Final round
5	China	12	8	4	24	29	19	1.526	1089	993	1.097	Final round
6	Italy	12	8	4	21	29	23	1.261	1129	1106	1.021	Final round
7	Japan	12	7	5	21	27	20	1.350	1058	969	1.092	Final round
8	Germany	12	7	5	20	26	23	1.130	1077	1069	1.007	Final round
9	Serbia	12	6	6	19	27	27	1.000	1154	1121	1.029	
10	Canada	12	6	6	18	24	24	1.000	1031	1044	0.988	
11	Dominican Republic	12	6	6	14	25	28	0.893	1151	1119	1.029	
12	Netherlands	12	5	7	18	23	22	1.045	1023	997	1.026	
13	Bulgaria	12	2	10	9	14	31	0.452	853	1013	0.842	
14	Thailand	12	2	10	8	11	30	0.367	837	981	0.853	
15	Croatia	12	2	10	6	8	30	0.267	734	910	0.807	2023 Challenger Cup
16	South Korea	12	0	12	0	3	36	0.083	730	982	0.743	

Source: VNL 2023 Preliminary Phase

=== Week 1 ===
==== Pool 1 ====
- All times are Further-eastern European Time (UTC+03:00).

Date	Time		Score		Set 1	Set 2	Set 3	Set 4	Set 5	Total	Report
30 May	17:00	Italy	3–2	Thailand	24–26	25–17	27–29	30–28	15–11	121–111	P2 Report
30 May	20:15	Poland	3–2	Canada	20–25	25–23	20–25	25–23	15–13	105–109	P2 Report
31 May	17:00	Serbia	2–3	United States	20–25	25–19	25–21	21–25	12–15	103–105	P2 Report
31 May	20:00	South Korea	0–3	Turkey	14–25	17–25	24–26			55–76	P2 Report
1 Jun	14:00	Canada	0–3	Thailand	17–25	24–26	21–25			62–76	P2 Report
1 Jun	17:00	Poland	3–1	Italy	21–25	25–20	25–14	25–18		96–77	P2 Report
1 Jun	20:00	Turkey	3–1	Serbia	24–26	25–17	25–15	25–21		99–79	P2 Report
2 Jun	14:00	Thailand	0–3	Poland	20–25	16–25	15–25			51–75	P2 Report
2 Jun	17:00	Canada	3–0	South Korea	25–17	25–16	25–18			75–51	P2 Report
2 Jun	20:00	United States	3–2	Italy	25–16	14–25	22–25	25–20	15–9	101–95	P2 Report
3 Jun	14:00	Poland	3–0	Serbia	25–18	25–22	30–28			80–68	P2 Report
3 Jun	17:00	United States	3–0	South Korea	25–16	27–25	25–11			77–52	P2 Report
3 Jun	20:00	Turkey	3–0	Italy	25–19	26–24	25–19			76–62	P2 Report
4 Jun	14:00	Thailand	3–0	South Korea	25–17	28–26	25–21			78–64	P2 Report
4 Jun	17:00	Canada	3–2	Serbia	18–25	28–26	25–23	18–25	15–12	104–111	P2 Report
4 Jun	20:00	United States	3–2	Turkey	25–22	25–22	22–25	11–25	15–9	98–103	P2 Report

==== Pool 2 ====
- All times are Japan Standard Time (UTC+09:00).

Date	Time		Score		Set 1	Set 2	Set 3	Set 4	Set 5	Total	Report
30 May	16:10	Germany	3–1	Netherlands	25–21	25–22	20–25	25–22		95–90	P2 Report
30 May	19:40	Japan	3–1	Dominican Republic	25–23	25–18	22–25	25–15		97–81	P2 Report
31 May	15:00	Croatia	0–3	Bulgaria	12–25	17–25	19–25			48–75	P2 Report
31 May	18:00	China	3–2	Brazil	25–23	22–25	25–20	20–25	15–12	107–105	P2 Report
1 Jun	12:00	Croatia	0–3	Germany	18–25	23–25	23–25			64–75	P2 Report
1 Jun	15:00	Bulgaria	2–3	Dominican Republic	25–22	16–25	25–16	14–25	11–15	91–103	P2 Report
1 Jun	18:00	Brazil	3–0	Netherlands	25–23	25–23	25–21			75–67	P2 Report
2 Jun	13:10	China	3–0	Germany	25–19	25–20	25–22			75–61	P2 Report
2 Jun	16:10	Dominican Republic	3–2	Netherlands	25–18	22–25	25–18	21–25	15–11	108–97	P2 Report
2 Jun	19:40	Croatia	0–3	Japan	17–25	19–25	20–25			56–75	P2 Report
3 Jun	12:40	Brazil	3–1	Dominican Republic	27–25	20–25	25–21	27–25		99–96	P2 Report
3 Jun	15:40	China	3–1	Netherlands	27–25	23–25	25–22	25–20		100–92	P2 Report
3 Jun	19:10	Bulgaria	0–3	Japan	20–25	17–25	19–25			56–75	P2 Report
4 Jun	12:40	Croatia	0–3	Brazil	24–26	18–25	8–25			50–76	P2 Report
4 Jun	15:40	Germany	3–2	Bulgaria	18–25	25–20	23–25	26–24	15–10	107–104	P2 Report
4 Jun	19:10	Japan	0–3	China	18–25	25–27	25–27			68–79	P2 Report

=== Week 2 ===
==== Pool 3 ====
- All times are Hong Kong Time (UTC+08:00).

Date	Time		Score		Set 1	Set 2	Set 3	Set 4	Set 5	Total	Report
13 Jun	17:00	Dominican Republic	1–3	Poland	23–25	28–30	25–23	17–25		93–103	P2 Report
13 Jun	20:30	China	3–0	Canada	25–14	25–18	29–27			79–59	P2 Report
14 Jun	17:00	Italy	3–0	Bulgaria	25–17	25–19	25–23			75–59	P2 Report
14 Jun	20:30	Netherlands	0–3	Turkey	29–31	21–25	15–25			65–81	P2 Report
15 Jun	13:30	Bulgaria	0–3	Canada	15–25	13–25	15–25			43–75	P2 Report
15 Jun	17:00	Poland	3–0	Turkey	25–22	25–20	30–28			80–70	P2 Report
15 Jun	20:30	Dominican Republic	2–3	Italy	16–25	25–16	25–21	22–25	10–15	98–102	P2 Report
16 Jun	13:30	Turkey	3–0	Canada	25–15	25–22	25–20			75–57	P2 Report
16 Jun	17:00	Poland	0–3	Netherlands	22–25	21–25	26–28			69–78	P2 Report
16 Jun	20:30	Bulgaria	1–3	China	25–20	7–25	10–25	15–25		57–95	P2 Report
17 Jun	13:30	Dominican Republic	3–2	Canada	22–25	25–13	25–17	23–25	15–10	110–90	P2 Report
17 Jun	17:00	Netherlands	2–3	Italy	25–22	22–25	20–25	25–18	17–19	109–109	P2 Report
17 Jun	20:30	Poland	3–0	China	25–20	25–23	25–22			75–65	P2 Report
18 Jun	13:30	Bulgaria	0–3	Netherlands	24–26	17–25	17–25			58–76	P2 Report
18 Jun	17:00	Dominican Republic	1–3	Turkey	23–25	19–25	25–23	20–25		87–98	P2 Report
18 Jun	20:30	Italy	3–2	China	23–25	25–23	18–25	25–22	15–12	106–107	P2 Report

==== Pool 4 ====
- All times are Brazil Time (UTC−03:00).

Date	Time		Score		Set 1	Set 2	Set 3	Set 4	Set 5	Total	Report
13 Jun	17:30	Croatia	1–3	United States	25–17	22–25	18–25	15–25		80–92	P2 Report
13 Jun	21:00	Japan	2–3	Serbia	25–16	20–25	25–16	20–25	10–15	100–97	P2 Report
14 Jun	17:30	Germany	3–1	Thailand	25–20	25–13	19–25	25–23		94–81	P2 Report
14 Jun	21:00	Brazil	3–0	South Korea	31–29	25–16	25–16			81–61	P2 Report
15 Jun	14:00	Thailand	0–3	United States	21–25	18–25	16–25			55–75	P2 Report
15 Jun	17:30	Japan	3–0	South Korea	25–18	25–13	25–19			75–50	P2 Report
15 Jun	21:00	Brazil	3–2	Serbia	23–25	25–22	21–25	25–12	15–11	109–95	P2 Report
16 Jun	14:00	Japan	2–3	Germany	23–25	25–14	22–25	25–20	8–15	103–99	P2 Report
16 Jun	17:30	South Korea	0–3	Croatia	23–25	21–25	14–25			58–75	P2 Report
16 Jun	21:00	Serbia	3–2	Thailand	24–26	22–25	25–17	25–12	16–14	112–94	P2 Report
17 Jun	14:00	Brazil	3–1	Germany	25–22	25–18	22–25	25–17		97–82	P2 Report
17 Jun	17:30	Japan	3–2	United States	23–25	25–23	25–19	23–25	15–6	111–98	P2 Report
17 Jun	21:00	Serbia	3–1	Croatia	25–16	25–11	23–25	25–17		98–69	P2 Report
18 Jun	10:00	Brazil	0–3	United States	22–25	19–25	22–25			63–75	P2 Report
18 Jun	14:00	Thailand	0–3	Croatia	17–25	21–25	20–25			58–75	P2 Report
18 Jun	17:30	Germany	3–1	South Korea	25–19	25–17	25–27	25–12		100–75	P2 Report

=== Week 3 ===
==== Pool 5 ====
- All times are Korea Standard Time (UTC+09:00).

Date	Time		Score		Set 1	Set 2	Set 3	Set 4	Set 5	Total	Report
27 Jun	15:30	Germany	3–1	Dominican Republic	25–19	25–18	18–25	25–21		93–83	P2 Report
27 Jun	19:00	Bulgaria	3–1	South Korea	25–22	25–18	24–26	25–15		99–81	P2 Report
28 Jun	15:30	United States	3–2	Poland	17–25	25–15	27–25	28–30	16–14	113–109	P2 Report
28 Jun	19:00	China	1–3	Serbia	13–25	25–17	23–25	20–25		81–92	P2 Report
29 Jun	12:00	Poland	3–2	Germany	15–25	25–19	25–19	19–25	17–15	101–103	P2 Report
29 Jun	15:30	United States	3–0	Bulgaria	25–15	25–17	25–17			75–49	P2 Report
29 Jun	19:30	Dominican Republic	3–0	South Korea	25–18	25–18	25–16			75–52	P2 Report
30 Jun	12:00	Bulgaria	1–3	Poland	28–26	19–25	16–25	15–25		78–101	P2 Report
30 Jun	15:30	Germany	1–3	Serbia	17–25	25–23	16–25	28–30		86–103	P2 Report
30 Jun	19:00	China	2–3	Dominican Republic	25–20	20–25	25–22	20–25	13–15	103–107	P2 Report
1 Jul	10:30	Serbia	2–3	Dominican Republic	25–22	15–25	25–23	19–25	10–15	94–110	P2 Report
1 Jul	14:00	South Korea	1–3	China	13–25	21–25	25–21	15–25		74–96	P2 Report
1 Jul	17:30	Germany	1–3	United States	22–25	25–18	22–25	13–25		82–93	P2 Report
2 Jul	10:30	Serbia	3–2	Bulgaria	20–25	25–16	25–14	17–25	15–4	102–84	P2 Report
2 Jul	14:00	Poland	3–0	South Korea	25–23	25–18	25–16			75–57	P2 Report
2 Jul	17:30	China	3–2	United States	18–25	25–19	19–25	25–20	15–8	102–97	P2 Report

==== Pool 6 ====
- All times are Thailand Standard Time (UTC+07:00).

Date	Time		Score		Set 1	Set 2	Set 3	Set 4	Set 5	Total	Report
27 Jun	17:00	Croatia	0–3	Canada	21–25	21–25	26–28			68–78	P2 Report
27 Jun	20:30	Thailand	0–3	Netherlands	26–28	18–25	20–25			64–78	P2 Report
28 Jun	17:00	Japan	3–2	Turkey	25–23	25–23	21–25	16–25	15–9	102–105	P2 Report
28 Jun	20:30	Brazil	3–2	Italy	26–28	25–20	19–25	25–21	15–10	110–104	P2 Report
29 Jun	13:00	Croatia	0–3	Netherlands	20–25	11–25	15–25			46–75	P2 Report
29 Jun	17:00	Brazil	2–3	Canada	30–28	22–25	23–25	25–21	15–17	115–116	P2 Report
29 Jun	20:30	Thailand	0–3	Turkey	15–25	15–25	20–25			50–75	P2 Report
30 Jun	13:00	Canada	2–3	Italy	25–22	23–25	14–25	26–24	10–15	98–111	P2 Report
30 Jun	17:00	Netherlands	3–1	Japan	25–22	25–17	21–25	25–20		96–84	P2 Report
30 Jun	20:30	Brazil	0–3	Turkey	22–25	16–25	22–25			60–75	P2 Report
1 Jul	13:00	Italy	3–0	Croatia	25–14	25–17	25–17			75–48	P2 Report
1 Jul	17:00	Netherlands	2–3	Canada	27–25	16–25	25–18	23–25	9–15	100–108	P2 Report
1 Jul	20:30	Thailand	0–3	Japan	18–25	22–25	20–25			60–75	P2 Report
2 Jul	13:00	Croatia	0–3	Turkey	14–25	23–25	18–25			55–75	P2 Report
2 Jul	17:00	Italy	3–1	Japan	25–23	25–23	17–25	25–22		92–93	P2 Report
2 Jul	20:30	Thailand	0–3	Brazil	20–25	16–25	23–25			59–75	P2 Report

== Final round ==
- All times are Central Daylight Time (UTC−05:00).

Quarter-finals
12 July
Poland	3
Germany	1
13 July
Brazil	1
China	3
12 July
United States	3
Japan	1
13 July
Turkey	3
Italy	0

Semi-finals
15 July
Poland	0
China	3
15 July
United States	1
Turkey	3

Final
16 July
China	1
Turkey	3
Third place match
16 July
Poland	3
United States	2

=== Quarter-finals ===
Date	Time		Score		Set 1	Set 2	Set 3	Set 4	Set 5	Total	Report
12 Jul	16:00	Poland	3–1	Germany	25–12	21–25	25–21	26–24		97–82	P2 Report
12 Jul	19:30	United States	3–1	Japan	25–23	25–21	18–25	25–18		93–87	P2 Report
13 Jul	10:30	Brazil	1–3	China	21–25	20–25	25–20	23–25		89–95	P2 Report
13 Jul	14:00	Turkey	3–0	Italy	25–20	25–15	25–18			75–53	P2 Report

=== Semi-finals ===
Date	Time		Score		Set 1	Set 2	Set 3	Set 4	Set 5	Total	Report
15 Jul	16:00	Poland	0–3	China	18–25	23–25	23–25			64–75	P2 Report
15 Jul	19:30	United States	1–3	Turkey	21–25	14–25	26–24	25–27		86–101	P2 Report

=== Third place match ===
Date	Time		Score		Set 1	Set 2	Set 3	Set 4	Set 5	Total	Report
16 Jul	14:00	Poland	3–2	United States	25–15	16–25	25–19	18–25	17–15	101–99	P2 Report

=== Final ===
Date	Time		Score		Set 1	Set 2	Set 3	Set 4	Set 5	Total	Report
16 Jul	17:30	China	1–3	Turkey	22–25	25–22	19–25	16–25		82–97	P2 Report

== Final standing ==
Rank	Team
1st place, gold medalist(s)	Turkey
2nd place, silver medalist(s)	China
3rd place, bronze medalist(s)	Poland
4	United States
5	Brazil
6	Italy
7	Japan
8	Germany
9	Serbia
10	Canada
11	Dominican Republic
12	Netherlands
13	Bulgaria
14	Thailand
15	Croatia
16	South Korea

Source: VNL 2023 final standings

2023 Women's VNL champions

Turkey
First title

14–woman roster
Gizem Örge, Simge Aköz, Cansu Özbay, Melissa Vargas, Ayça Aykaç, Hande Baladın, Derya Cebecioğlu, Elif Şahin, Eda Erdem (c), Saliha Şahin, Zehra Güneş, Aslı Kalaç, İlkin Aydın, Ebrar Karakurt
Head coach
Daniele Santarelli

== Awards ==
- Most valuable player
  (Turkey) Melissa Vargas
- Best setter
  (China) Diao Linyu
- Best outside spikers
  (China) Li Yingying
  (Poland) Martyna Łukasik
- Best middle blockers
  (Turkey) Zehra Güneş
  (China) Yuan Xinyue
- Best opposite spiker
  (Turkey) Melissa Vargas
- Best libero
  (Turkey) Gizem Örge

== Statistics leaders ==
=== Preliminary round ===
Statistics leaders correct as of Week 3 of preliminary round.

Best Scorers (Note: Best scorers determined by scored points from spike, block and serve.)
	Player	Attacks	Blocks	Serves	Total
1	(Poland) Magdalena Stysiak	206	32	4	242
2	(China) Li Yingying	214	13	13	240
3	(Dominican Republic) Gaila González	197	28	14	239
4	(Italy) Sylvia Nwakalor	202	31	3	236
5	(Canada) Alexa Gray	208	13	10	231

Best Attackers (Note: Best attackers determined by successful spikes.)
	Player	Spikes	Faults	Shots	%	Total
1	(China) Li Yingying	214	54	153	50.83	421
2	(Canada) Alexa Gray	208	67	241	40.31	516
3	(Poland) Magdalena Stysiak	206	71	171	45.98	448
4	(Italy) Sylvia Nwakalor	202	69	171	45.70	442
5	(Dominican Republic) Gaila González	197	85	184	42.27	466

Best Blockers (Note: Best blockers determined by the stuff blocks, faults and rebounds.)
	Player	Blocks	Faults	Rebounds	Avg	Total
1	(Poland) Agnieszka Korneluk	43	60	67	3.58	170
2	(Bulgaria) Mira Todorova	39	35	45	3.36	119
3	(Dominican Republic) Jineiry Martinez	35	45	82	2.92	162
4	(Canada) Emily Maglio	35	49	75	2.92	159
5	(Germany) Camilla Weitzel	34	55	84	2.83	173

Best Servers (Note: Best servers determined by aces, faults and hits.)
	Player	Aces	Faults	Hits	Avg	Total
1	(Bulgaria) Maria Yordanova	19	21	115	1.58	155
2	(Japan) Sarina Koga	17	19	149	1.42	185
3	(Germany) Camilla Weitzel	16	18	151	1.33	185
4	(Germany) Hanna Orthmann	15	36	84	1.25	135
5	(Dominican Republic) Gaila González	14	35	150	1.17	199

Best Setters (Note: Best setters determined by running setts, faults and still sets.)
	Player	Running	Faults	Still	Avg	Total
1	(Canada) Brie King	266	16	944	22.17	1226
2	(Germany) Pia Kästner	264	6	858	22.00	1128
3	(China) Diao Linyu	251	11	797	20.92	1059
4	(Japan) Nanami Seki	220	7	730	18.33	957
5	(Italy) Francesca Bosio	205	4	1022	17.08	1229

Best Diggers (Note: Best diggers determined by successful digs, faults and receptions.)
	Player	Digs	Faults	Receptions	Avg	Total
1	(Bulgaria) Mila Pashkuleva	176	41	19	14.67	236
2	(Croatia) Izabela Štimac	160	38	21	13.33	219
3	(Germany) Anna Pogany	158	58	29	13.17	245
4	(Japan) Minami Nishimura	151	39	17	12.58	207
5	(Serbia) Teodora Pusic	144	49	28	12.00	221

Best Receivers (Note: Best receivers determined by efficient receptions, faults and serve receptions.)
	Player	Excellents	Faults	Serve	%	Total
1	(Thailand) Chatchu-on Moksri	82	18	225	25.23	325
2	(Croatia) Izabela Štimac	80	19	128	35.24	227
3	(China) Li Yingying	76	13	131	34.55	220
4	(Germany) Lina Alsmeier	75	15	138	32.89	228
5	(China) Wang Yunlu	73	15	172	28.08	260

=== Final round ===
Statistics leaders correct as of final round.

Best Scorers
	Player	Attacks	Blocks	Serves	Total
1	(Turkey) Melissa Vargas	55	5	5	65
2	(Poland) Magdalena Stysiak	52	1	3	56
3	(China) Li Yingying	48	2	1	51
4	(Poland) Martyna Łukasik	35	1	2	38
5	(United States) Andrea Drews	32	3	2	37

Best Attackers
	Player	Spikes	Faults	Shots	%	Total
1	(Turkey) Melissa Vargas	55	12	42	50.46	109
2	(Poland) Magdalena Stysiak	52	22	51	41.60	125
3	(China) Li Yingying	48	12	45	45.71	105
4	(Poland) Martyna Łukasik	35	7	38	43.75	80
5	(United States) Andrea Drews	32	22	38	34.78	92

Best Blockers
	Player	Blocks	Faults	Rebounds	Avg	Total
1	(Turkey) Zehra Güneş	14	12	18	4.67	44
2	(Turkey) Eda Erdem	12	17	21	4.00	50
3	(China) Yuan Xinyue	10	14	15	3.33	39
4	(Poland) Joanna Pacak	8	2	6	2.67	16
5	(United States) Chiaka Ogbogu	8	10	19	2.67	37

Best Servers
	Player	Aces	Faults	Hits	Avg	Total
1	(Turkey) Melissa Vargas	5	4	39	1.67	48
2	(Poland) Agnieszka Korneluk	3	7	26	1.00	36
3	(Poland) Magdalena Stysiak	3	8	30	1.00	41
4	(United States) Micha Hancock	3	4	34	1.00	41
5	(Turkey) Ebrar Karakurt	3	3	41	1.00	47

Best Setters
	Player	Running	Faults	Still	Avg	Total
1	(China) Diao Linyu	71	1	161	23.67	233
2	(Poland) Katarzyna Wenerska	42	2	225	14.00	269
3	(United States) Micha Hancock	37	5	231	12.33	273
4	(Brazil) Macris Carneiro	36	0	72	36.00	108
5	(Germany) Pia Kästner	33	3	89	26.40	125

Best Diggers
	Player	Digs	Faults	Receptions	Avg	Total
1	(Turkey) Gizem Örge	46	14	6	15.33	66
2	(Poland) Maria Stenzel	40	10	2	13.33	52
3	(United States) Justine Wong-Orantes	39	19	4	13.00	62
4	(Poland) Magdalena Stysiak	35	4	2	11.67	41
5	(China) Wang Mengjie	38	8	5	10.00	43

Best Receivers
	Player	Excellents	Faults	Serve	%	Total
1	(Poland) Martyna Łukasik	22	6	58	25.58	86
2	(Poland) Maria Stenzel	21	1	37	35.59	59
3	(Germany) Lena Stigrot	16	0	23	41.03	39
4	(China) Wang Yunlu	16	8	39	25.40	63
5	(United States) Kelsey Robinson	14	1	33	29.17	48

== See also ==
- 2023 FIVB Volleyball Women's Challenger Cup
