= Diao Linyu =

Chinese volleyball player (born 1994)

Personal information
- Nationality: Chinese
- Born: 29 March 1994 (age 32); Huaian, Jiangsu
- Height: 1.82 m (6 ft 0 in)
- Weight: 69 kg (152 lb)
- Spike: 309 cm (122 in)
- Block: 303 cm (119 in)

Volleyball information
- Position: Setter
- Current club: Jiangsu Zenith Steel
- Number: 3 (NT) 6 (Club)

Career
Years	Teams
2013 - present	Jiangsu Zenith Steel

National team
2017 - present	China
Honours
World Grand Champions Cup
Gold medal – first place	2017 Japan	Team
Nations League
Silver medal – second place	2023 Arlington	Team
Bronze medal – third place	2018 Nanjing	Team
Bronze medal – third place	2019 Nanjing	Team
Asian Games
Gold medal – first place	2018 Jakarta-Palembang
Gold medal – first place	2022 Hangzhou	Team
Montreux Volley Masters
Bronze medal – third place	2017 Switzerland	Team

Diao Linyu (Chinese: 刁琳宇; born 29 March 1994) is a Chinese indoor volleyball player. She is a member of China women's national volleyball team. She participated at the 2017 Volleyball World Grand Prix, 2018 Montreux Volley Masters, 2019 Montreux Volley Masters, and 2018 Asian Games.

On club level, she plays for Jiangsu Zenith Steel.

== Awards ==
=== Individuals ===
- 2016-17 Chinese Volleyball League "Best Setter"
- 2020-21 Chinese Volleyball League "Best Setter"
- 2023 FIVB Volleyball Women's Nations League "Best Setter"

=== National team ===
- 2017 World Grand Champions Cup - Gold Medal
- 2018 Asian Games - Gold Medal
- 2023 Volleyball Nations League - Silver Medal
- 2022 Asian Games: - Gold medal
