= Pia Kästner =

German volleyball player (born 1998)

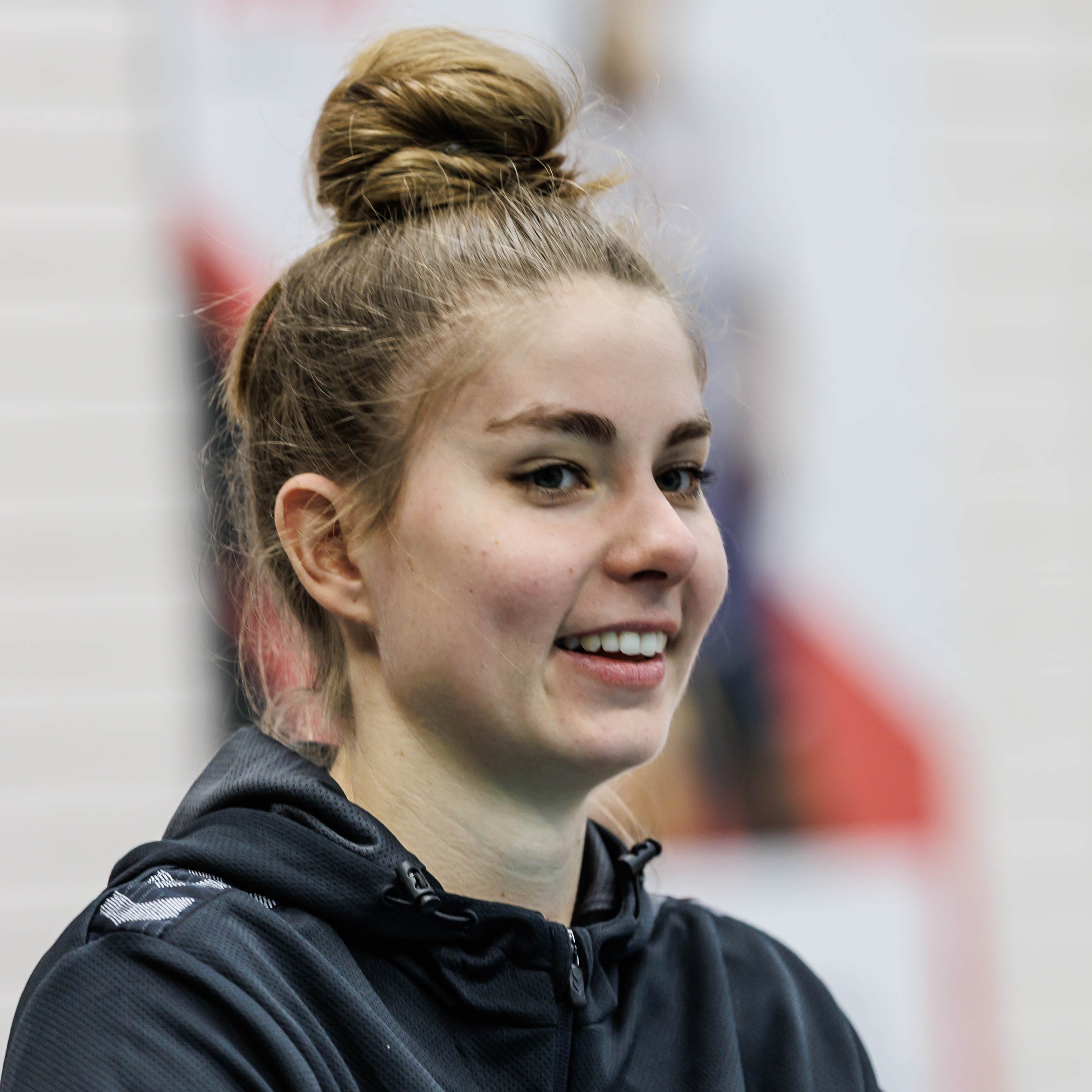
- Kästner in 2025

Personal information
- Nationality: German
- Born: 29 June 1998 (age 28); Eisenhüttenstadt, Germany
- Height: 1.82 m (5 ft 11 1/2 in)
- Weight: 68 kg (150 lb)
- Spike: 297 cm (117 in)
- Block: 286 cm (113 in)

Volleyball information
- Current club: (Germany) SSC Palmberg Schwerin
- Number: 2

Career
Years
2013 - 2017
2017 - 2021 2021 - 2022
2022 - current
Teams
(Germany) VCO Berlin
(Germany) Allianz MTV Stuttgart (France) ASPTT Mulhouse
(Germany) SSC Palmberg Schwerin
Honours
Women's volleyball
Representing Germany

Pia Kästner (born 29 June 1998 in Eisenhüttenstadt) is a German volleyball player. She participated in the 2018 FIVB Volleyball Women's Nations League.

== Career ==
Pia Kästner played in her youth league at Eisenhüttenstadt and later at SC Potsdam. From 2013 to 2017, she played with the junior team of VC Olympia Berlin in the second and first Bundesliga, as well as in the junior national team, with them in 2015 at the 2015 FIVB Volleyball Girls' U18 World Championship in Peru, and at the 2016 UEFA European Under-19 Championship in Hungary. In 2017, she played for Allianz MTV Stuttgart.
