= 2022 FIVB Women's Volleyball Nations League squads =

This article shows the roster of all participating teams at the 2022 FIVB Women's Volleyball Nations League.

== Belgium ==
The following is Belgium's roster in the 2022 Women's Nations League.

Head Coach: (Belgium) Gert Vande Broek

- 2 Elise Van Sas S
- 3 Britt Herbots OH
- 4 Nathalie Lemmens MB
- 5 Jodie Guilliams OH
- 6 Helena Gilson OH
- 7 Celine Van Gestel OH
- 8 Grobelna Kaja OP
- 9 Nel Demeyer L
- 10 Pauline Martin OP
- 11 Stien Goris OH
- 12 Charlotte Krenicky S
- 13 Marlies Janssens MB
- 14 Laura Meynckens OP
- 15 Jutta Van de Vyver S
- 16 Laure Flament OH
- 18 Britt Rampelberg L
- 19 Silke Van Avermaet MB
- 20 Marie Lambrix L
- 21 Manon Stragier OH
- 22 Anna Koulberg MB
- 24 Sara De Donder S
- 27 Yana Wouters MB
- 28 Lara Nagels S
- 29 Lena Versteynen OP
- 30 Britt Ruysschaert OH

== Brazil ==
The following is Brazil's roster in the 2022 Women's Nations League.

Head Coach: (Brazil) Zé Roberto

- 1 Milka Silva MB
- 2 Diana Duarte MB
- 3 Júlia Kudiess MB
- 4 Ana Carolina da Silva MB
- 5 Priscila Daroit OH
- 6 Nyeme Costa L
- 7 Rosamaria Montibeller OH
- 8 Macris Carneiro S
- 9 Roberta Ratzke S
- 10 Gabriela Guimarães OH
- 11 Karina Barbosa OH
- 12 Ana Cristina de Souza OH
- 13 Kasiely Clemente OH
- 14 Natália Araujo L
- 15 Lorena Viezel MB
- 16 Kisy Nascimento OP
- 17 Júlia Bergmann OH
- 18 Mayany de Souza MB
- 19 Tainara Santos OH
- 20 Lorrayna da Silva OP
- 21 Kenya Malachias S
- 22 Claúdia Bueno S
- 23 Bruna Honório OP
- 24 Lorenne Teixeira OP
- 25 Laís Vasques L

== Bulgaria ==
The following is Bulgaria's roster in the 2022 Women's Nations League.

Head Coach: (Italy) Lorenzo Micelli

- 1 Gergana Dimitrova OH
- 2 Nasya Dimitrova MB
- 3 Polina Neykova S
- 4 Eva Yaneva OH
- 5 Maria Yordanova OP
- 6 Miroslava Paskova OH
- 7 Lora Kitipova S
- 8 Petya Barakova S
- 9 Borislava Saykova MB
- 10 Mira Todorova MB
- 11 Hristina Vuchkova MB
- 12 Dima Usheva MB
- 13 Galina Karabasheva L
- 15 Zhana Todorova L
- 16 Elitsa Vasileva OH
- 17 Radostina Marinova OP
- 18 Silvana Chausheva OH
- 19 Aleksandra Milanova OH
- 20 Vangeliya Rachkovska OH
- 21 Monika Krasteva OH
- 24 Lora Slavcheva S
- 26 Mirela Shahpazova S
- 27 Iva Dudova OP
- 28 Mariya Krivoshiyska MB
- 29 Ralitsa Vasileva OP

== Canada ==
The following is the Canada's roster in the 2022 Women's Nations League.

Head coach: (Canada) Shannon Winzer

- 1 Allyssah Fitterer MB
- 2 Melissa Langegger OH
- 3 Kiera Van Ryk OH
- 4 Vicky Savard OH
- 5 Julia Murmann L
- 6 Jazmine White MB
- 7 Claire Cossarini MB
- 8 Alicia Ogoms MB
- 9 Alexa Gray OH
- 10 Courtney Baker S
- 11 Andrea Mitrovic OH
- 12 Jennifer Cross MB
- 13 Brie King S
- 14 Hilary Howe OH
- 15 Shainah Joseph OP
- 16 Caroline Livingston OH
- 17 Katerina Georgiadis L
- 18 Kim Robitaille S
- 19 Emily Maglio MB
- 20 Arielle Palermo L
- 21 Avery Heppell MB
- 22 Kennedy Snape L
- 23 Laura Madill S
- 24 Natasha Calkins OP
- 25 Sydney Grills OP

== China ==
The following is the China's roster in the 2022 Women's Nations League.

Head Coach: (China) Cai Bin

- 1 Yuan Xinyue MB
- 3 Diao Linyu S
- 4 Yang Hanyu MB
- 5 Gao Yi MB
- 6 Gong Xiangyu OP
- 7 Wang Yuanyuan MB
- 8 Jin Ye OH
- 10 Wang Yunlu OH
- 11 Wang Yizhu OH
- 12 Li Yingying OH
- 13 Cai Yaqian S
- 14 Zheng Yixin MB
- 15 Wang Weiyi L
- 16 Ding Xia S
- 17 Ni Feifan L
- 18 Miao Yiwen OP
- 19 Chen Peiyan OP
- 20 Wu Mengjie OH
- 21 Wang Yifan OH
- 22 Xu Jianan L
- 23 Wang Mengjie L
- 24 Zhong Hu OH
- 25 Du Qingqing OP
- 26 Wang Wenhan MB

== Dominican Republic ==
The following is the Dominican Republic's roster in the 2022 Women's Nations League.

Head coach: (Brazil) Marcos Kwiek

- 2 Yaneirys Rodriguez L
- 3 Esthefany Rabit MB
- 4 Vielka Peralta OH
- 5 Brenda Castillo L
- 6 Camil Domínguez S
- 7 Niverka Marte S
- 9 Angélica Hinojosa MB
- 12 Yokaty Pérez S
- 13 Massiel Matos OH
- 15 Madeline Paredes OH
- 16 Yonkaira Peña OH
- 17 Gina Mambrú OP
- 18 Bethania de la Cruz OH
- 19 Cándida Arias MB
- 20 Brayelin Martínez OH
- 21 Jineiry Martínez MB
- 22 Samaret Caraballo OH
- 23 Gaila González OP
- 24 Geraldine González MB
- 25 Larysmer Martínez L

== Germany ==
The following is the Germany's roster in the 2022 Women's Nations League.

Head coach: (Belgium) Vital Heynen

- 1 Linda Bock L
- 2 Pia Kästner S
- 4 Pogany Anna L
- 5 Corina Glaab S
- 6 Jennifer Janiska OH
- 7 Ivana Vanjak OH
- 9 Lina Alsmeier OH
- 10 Lena Stigrot OH
- 12 Hanna Orthmann OH
- 13 Saskia Hippe OP
- 14 Marie Schölzel MB
- 15 Elisa Lohmann L
- 16 Lea Ambrosius MB
- 19 Sophie Dreblow L
- 21 Camilla Weitzel MB
- 22 Monique Strubbe MB
- 23 Sarah Straube S
- 24 Anastasia Cekulaev MB
- 25 Vanessa Agbortabi OH
- 28 Annie Cesar L
- 29 Pia Leweling OH
- 30 Pia Fernau S
- 35 Luisa Van Clewe MB
- 38 Meghan Barthel S
- 44 Laura Emonts OH

== Italy ==
The following is Italy's roster in the 2022 Women's Nations League.

Head Coach: (Italy) Davide Mazzanti

- 1 Marina Lubian MB
- 2 Francesca Bosio S
- 3 Alessia Gennari OH
- 4 Sara Bonifacio MB
- 5 Ofelia Malinov S
- 6 Monica De Gennaro L
- 7 Eleonora Fersino L
- 8 Alessia Orro S
- 9 Caterina Bosetti OH
- 10 Cristina Chirichella MB
- 11 Anna Danesi MB
- 12 Anastasia Guerra OH
- 13 Ilaria Battistoni S
- 14 Elena Pietrini OH
- 15 Sylvia Nwakalor OP
- 16 Sofia D'Odorico OH
- 17 Miriam Sylla OH
- 18 Paola Ogechi Egonu OP
- 19 Federica Squarcini MB
- 20 Sara Panetoni L
- 21 Alice Degradi OH
- 22 Ruth Enweonwu OP
- 23 Elena Perinelli OH
- 24 Alessia Mazzaro MB
- 25 Loveth Omoruyi OH

== Japan ==
The following is the Japan's roster in the 2022 Women's Nations League.

Head Coach: (Japan) Masayoshi Manabe

- 1 Akane Yamagishi L
- 2 Mami Uchiseto OH
- 3 Sarina Koga OH
- 4 Mayu Ishikawa OH
- 5 Haruyo Shimamura MB
- 8 Haruka Miyashita S
- 9 Manami Kojima L
- 10 Arisa Inoue OH
- 14 Fuyumi Hawi Okumu Oba OH
- 15 Kotona Hayashi OH
- 19 Nichika Yamada MB
- 23 Mami Yokota MB
- 24 Tamaki Matsui S
- 25 Erina Ogawa MB
- 26 Airi Miyabe OH
- 28 Asuka Hamamatsu MB
- 30 Nanami Seki S
- 37 Ameze Miyabe OH
- 38 Yoshino Sato OH

== Netherlands ==
The following is Netherlands' roster in the 2022 Women's Nations League.

Head Coach: (Netherlands) Avital Selinger

- 1 Kirsten Knip L
- 2 Fleur Savelkoel OH
- 3 Marieke van der Mark OP
- 4 Celeste Plak OP
- 5 Jolien Knollema OH
- 7 Juliët Lohuis MB
- 8 Demi Korevaar MB
- 9 Myrthe Schoot L
- 10 Sarah Van Aalen S
- 11 Anne Buijs OH
- 12 Bongaerts Britt S
- 13 Jolijn de Haan OP
- 14 Laura Dijkema S
- 16 Indy Baijens MB
- 17 Iris Vos OH
- 18 Jasper Marrit OH
- 19 Nika Daalderop OH
- 20 Tessa Polder MB
- 21 Britte Stuut MB
- 23 Eline Timmerman MB
- 24 Laura de Zwart MB
- 25 Florien Reesink L
- 26 Elles Dambrink OH
- 27 Iris Scholten OP
- 29 Famke Boonstra OH

== Poland ==
The following is the Poland's roster in the 2022 Women's Nations League.

Head coach: (Italy) Stefano Lavarini

- 1 Maria Stenzel L
- 2 Anna Stencel MB
- 3 Klaudia Alagierska MB
- 5 Agnieszka Kąkolewska MB
- 6 Kamila Witkowska MB
- 7 Martyna Łazowska S
- 8 Zuzanna Górecka OH
- 9 Magdalena Stysiak OP
- 10 Monika Fedusio OH
- 11 Martyna Łukasik OH
- 12 Aleksandra Szczygłowska L
- 14 Joanna Wołosz S
- 15 Martyna Czyrniańska OH
- 16 Justyna Łysiak L
- 17 Julita Piasecka OH
- 18 Aleksandra Gryka MB
- 19 Iga Wasilewska MB
- 21 Alicja Grabka S
- 22 Weronika Szlagowska OH
- 23 Karolina Drużkowska OP
- 24 Paulina Damaske OH
- 25 Weronika Sobiczewska OP
- 26 Katarzyna Wenerska S
- 30 Olivia Różański OH
- 96 Magdalena Jurczyk MB

== Serbia ==
The following is Serbia's roster in the 2022 Women's Nations League.

Head coach: (Italy) Daniele Santarelli

- 1 Bianka Buša OH
- 2 Katarina Lazović OH
- 3 Sara Carić OP
- 4 Bojana Živković S
- 5 Mina Popović MB
- 7 Ana Jakšić S
- 8 Slađana Mirković S
- 9 Brankica Mihajlović OH
- 12 Teodora Pušić L
- 13 Ana Bjelica OP
- 14 Maja Aleksić MB
- 15 Jovana Stevanović MB
- 17 Tijana Milojević L
- 19 Bojana Milenković OH
- 20 Jovana Zelenović OP
- 21 Jovana Kocić MB
- 22 Sara Lozo OP
- 23 Mila Đorđević S
- 25 Božica Marković MB
- 26 Vanja Savić OP
- 28 Jelena Delić MB
- 31 Sanja Djurdjević L
- 33 Jovana Cvetković OH
- 34 Jovana Mirosavljević OH
- 35 Mina Mijatović OH

== South Korea ==
The following is the South Korea's roster in the 2022 Women's Nations League.

Head Coach: (Spain) Cesar Hernández González

- 1 Yoo Seo-yeun OH
- 2 Kim Ha-kyung S
- 3 Yeum Hye-seon S
- 4 Han Da-hye L
- 5 Noh Ran L
- 6 Lee Seon-woo OH
- 7 Kang So-hwi OH
- 8 Jung Ho-young MB
- 9 Lee Ju-ah MB
- 10 Go Ye-rim OH
- 11 Park Hye-min OH
- 12 Lee Da-hyeon MB
- 13 Park Jeong-ah OH
- 14 Jeong Ji-yun OH
- 15 Hwang Min-kyung OH
- 16 Lee Han-bi OH
- 17 Park Hae-jin S
- 18 Choi Jeong-min MB
- 19 Kim Hee-jin OP
- 20 Han Su-jin L
- 21 Kim Chae-yeon MB
- 22 An Hye-jin S
- 23 Park Eun-jin MB
- 24 Na Hyun-soo OP
- 25 Moon Myoung-hwa MB

== Thailand ==
The following is Thailand's roster in the 2022 Women's Nations League.

Head coach: (Thailand) Danai Sriwatcharamethakul

- 1 Wipawee Srithong OH
- 2 Piyanut Pannoy L
- 3 Pornpun Guedpard S
- 4 Thatdao Nuekjang MB
- 6 Kannika Thipachot OH
- 7 Hathairat Jarat MB
- 8 Watchareeya Nuanjam MB
- 9 Jarasporn Bundasak MB
- 10 Pattiya Juangjan OH
- 11 Khatthalee Pinsuwan OH
- 12 Hattaya Bamrungsuk MB
- 13 Natthanicha Jaisaen S
- 14 Sutadta Chuewulim OH
- 15 Kaewkalaya Kamulthala MB
- 16 Pimpichaya Kokram OP
- 17 Tichaya Boonlert S
- 18 Ajcharaporn Kongyot OH
- 19 Chatchu-on Moksri OH
- 20 Supattra Pairoj L
- 21 Thanacha Sooksod OP
- 22 Nuttaporn Sanitklang L
- 23 Sirima Manakij S
- 24 Tichakorn Boonlert MB
- 25 Sasipapron Janthawisut OH
- 36 Donphon Sinpho OH

== Turkey ==
The following is the Türkiye's roster in the 2022 Women's Nations League.

Head coach: (Italy) Giovanni Guidetti

- 1 Beyza Arıcı MB
- 2 Simge Şebnem Aköz L
- 3 Cansu Özbay S
- 4 Tuğba Şenoğlu OH
- 5 Bahar Akbay MB
- 6 Saliha Şahin OH
- 7 Hande Baladın OH
- 8 Buse Ünal S
- 9 Meliha İsmailoğlu OH
- 10 Ayça Aykaç L
- 11 Derya Cebecioğlu OH
- 12 Elif Şahin S
- 13 Meryem Boz OP
- 14 Eda Erdem Dündar MB
- 17 Sıla Çalışkan S
- 18 Zehra Güneş MB
- 19 Ceren Kapucu OP
- 20 Aylin Acar L
- 21 Buse Kayacan L
- 22 İlkin Aydın OH
- 23 Yaprak Erkek OH
- 28 Yasemin Yıldırım MB
- 44 Ayçin Akyol MB
- 77 Tutku Burcu Yüzgenç OP
- 99 Ebrar Karakurt OP

== United States ==
The following is USA's roster in the 2022 Women's Nations League.

Head coach: (United States) Karch Kiraly

- 1 Micha Hancock S
- 2 Jordyn Poulter S
- 3 Kathryn Plummer OH
- 4 Justine Wong-Orantes L
- 5 Morgan Hentz L
- 6 Tori Dixon MB
- 7 Lauren Carlini S
- 8 Hannah Tapp MB
- 9 Madison Kingdon OH
- 10 Brionne Butler MB
- 11 Andrea Drews OP
- 12 Jordan Thompson OP
- 13 Sarah Wilhite Parsons OH
- 15 Haleigh Washington MB
- 16 Dana Rettke MB
- 17 Dani Drews OH
- 18 Kara Bajema OH
- 19 Jenna Gray S
- 20 Danielle Cuttino OP
- 22 Kendall White L
- 23 Kelsey Robinson OH
- 24 Chiaka Ogbogu MB
- 30 Ali Frantti OH
- 31 Anna Stevenson MB
- 33 Nia Reed OP

== See also ==
- 2022 FIVB Men's Volleyball Nations League squads
- 2022 FIVB Volleyball Women's Challenger Cup squads
