= 2024 FIVB Women's Volleyball Nations League squads =

This article shows the roster of all the participating teams at the 2024 FIVB Women's Volleyball Nations League.

== Brazil ==
The following was Brazil's roster at the 2024 Women's Volleyball Nations League.

Head coach: (Brazil) José Roberto Guimarães

- 1 Nyeme Costa L
- 2 Diana Duarte MB
- 3 Macris Carneiro S
- 4 Giovana Gasparini S
- 5 Priscila Daroit OH
- 6 Thaísa Menezes MB
- 7 Rosamaria Montibeller OH
- 8 Júlia Kudiess MB
- 9 Roberta Ratzke S
- 10 Gabriela Guimarães OH
- 11 Maiara Basso MB
- 12 Ana Cristina de Souza OH
- 13 Sabrina Machado OP
- 14 Natália Araujo L
- 15 Ana Carolina da Silva MB
- 16 Kisy Nascimento OP
- 17 Júlia Bergmann OH
- 19 Tainara Santos OH
- 20 Lais Vasquez L
- 21 Natália Pereira OH
- 22 Maira Claro OH
- 23 Carol Gattaz MB
- 24 Lorenne Teixiera OP
- 25 Adenízia da Silva MB
- 26 Luzia Nezzo MB
- 27 Lorrayna Marys OP
- 28 Helena Wenk OH
- 29 Cláudia da Silva S
- 30 Dani Lins S

== Bulgaria ==
The following was Bulgaria's roster at the 2024 Women's Volleyball Nations League.

Head coach: (Italy) Lorenzo Micelli

- 1 Emileta Racheva OH
- 2 Viktoria Ninova L
- 3 Viktoria Koeva OH
- 4 Ani Bozdeva OH
- 5 Maria Yordanova OH
- 6 Miroslava Paskova OH
- 7 Simona Nikolova OP
- 8 Petya Barakova S
- 9 Elena Becheva OH
- 10 Vangeliya Rachkovska OH
- 11 Mariya Krivoshiyska MB
- 12 Iva Dudova OP
- 13 Mila Pashkuleva L
- 14 Borislava Saykova MB
- 15 Zhana Todorova L
- 16 Mirela Shahpazova S
- 18 Ivanina Malinova MB
- 19 Aleksandra Milanova OH
- 20 Elena Kolarova MB
- 21 Monika Krasteva OH
- 22 Yoana Dokova L
- 23 Mikaela Stoyanova OP
- 24 Margarita Guncheva S
- 25 Dariya Ivanova OH
- 26 Tsvetelina Ilieva OH
- 27 Aleksandra Saykova MB
- 28 Merelin Nikolova OP
- 29 Kaya Nikolova MB
- 30 Boryana Angelova MB
- 31 Nikol Milanova S

== Canada ==
The following was Canada's roster at the 2024 Women's Volleyball Nations League.

Head coach: (Canada) Shannon Winzer

- 1 Katerina Georgiadis L
- 3 Kiera Van Ryk OH
- 4 Vicky Savard OH
- 5 Julia Murmann L
- 6 Jazmine White MB
- 7 Layne Van Buskirk MB
- 8 Alicia Ogoms MB
- 9 Alexa Gray OH
- 10 Courtney Baker S
- 11 Andrea Mitrovic OH
- 12 Jennifer Cross MB
- 13 Brie King S
- 14 Hilary Howe OH
- 15 Shainah Joseph OP
- 17 Jost Kacey L
- 18 Kim Robitaille S
- 19 Emily Maglio MB
- 20 Lucy Borowski OP
- 21 Avery Heppell MB
- 22 Averie Allard S
- 24 Emoni Bush OP
- 26 Quinn Pelland S
- 27 Nyadholi Thokbuom MB
- 28 Raya Surinx OH
- 29 Kaylee Plouffe MB
- 30 Madyson Saris OH
- 31 Jasmine Rivest OH
- 32 Thana Fayad OH
- 34 Gabrielle Attieh OH
- 35 Isabella Noble S

== China ==
The following was China's roster at the 2024 Women's Volleyball Nations League.

Head coach: (China) Cai Bin

- 1 Yuan Xinyue MB
- 2 Zhu Ting OH
- 3 Diao Linyu S
- 4 Yang Hanyu MB
- 5 Gao Yi MB
- 6 Gong Xiangyu OP
- 7 Wang Yuanyuan MB
- 8 Xu Xiaoting S
- 9 Zhang Changning OH
- 10 Wang Yunlu OH
- 11 Zhong Hui OH
- 12 Li Yingying OH
- 14 Zheng Yixin MB
- 15 Xu Jianan L
- 16 Ding Xia S
- 17 Ni Feifan L
- 18 Wang Mengjie L
- 19 Wang Yizhu OH
- 20 Duan Mengke OP
- 21 Wu Mengjie OH
- 22 Zhuang Yushan OH
- 23 Wang Wenhan MB
- 24 Zeng Jieya MB
- 25 Zhou Yetong OP
- 26 Wang Yifan OH
- 27 Xie Shengyu S

== Dominican Republic ==
The following was Dominican Republic's roster at the 2024 Women's Volleyball Nations League.

Head coach: (Brazil) Marcos Kwiek

- 1 Cándida Arias MB
- 2 Yaneirys Rodriguez L
- 3 Lisvel Elisa Eve MB
- 4 Vielka Peralta OH
- 5 Brenda Castillo L
- 6 Ariana Rodríguez OP
- 7 Niverka Marte S
- 8 Alondra Tapia OP
- 9 Angélica Hinojosa MB
- 10 Natalia Martinez OH
- 11 Geraldine González MB
- 12 Yokaty Pérez S
- 15 Madeline Guillén OH
- 16 Yonkaira Peña OH
- 18 Bethania de la Cruz OH
- 20 Brayelin Martínez OH
- 21 Jineiry Martínez MB
- 22 Samaret Caraballo OH
- 23 Gaila González OP
- 25 Larysmer Martínez L
- 26 Flormarie Heredia OH
- 27 Iliana Rodríguez L
- 28 Yanlis Felix OP
- 29 Florangel Terrero MB
- 30 Ailyn Liberato S

== France ==
The following was France's roster at the 2024 Women's Volleyball Nations League.

Head coach: (Belgium) Émile Rousseaux

- 1 Héléna Cazaute (c) OH
- 2 Nawelle Chouikh-Barbez OH
- 3 Amandine Giardino L
- 4 Christina Bauer MB
- 5 Hope Rakotozafy L
- 7 Iman Ndiaye OP
- 8 Manon Bernard L
- 9 Nina Stojiljković S
- 10 Fatoumata Fangedou MB
- 11 Lucille Gicquel OP
- 12 Isaline Sager-Weider MB
- 14 Clémence Garcia MB
- 15 Amandha Marine Sylves MB
- 17 Alexandra Dascalu OP
- 19 Julie Oliveira Souza OP
- 21 Eva Elouga MB
- 23 Léandra Olinga-Andela MB
- 27 Mahé Mauriat S
- 29 Lena Chameaux S
- 34 Lisa Arbos OH
- 35 Enora Danard-Selosse S
- 53 Maëva Schalk OP
- 57 Chloe Mayer MB
- 63 Émilie Respaut S
- 75 Guewe Diouf OH
- 86 Jade Cholet OP
- 88 Amélie Rotar OP
- 91 Halimatou Bah OH
- 98 Sabine Haewegene OH
- 99 Juliette Gelin L

== Germany ==
The following was Germany's roster at the 2024 Women's Volleyball Nations League.

Head coach: (Germany) Alexander Waibl

- 1 Vanessa Agbortabi OH
- 2 Pia Kästner S
- 3 Annie Cesar L
- 4 Pogany Anna L
- 5 Corina Glaab S
- 6 Antonia Stautz OH
- 8 Kimberly Drewniok OP
- 9 Lina Alsmeier OH
- 10 Lena Stigrot OH
- 11 Pia Timmer OH
- 13 Emilia Weske OP
- 14 Marie Schölzel MB
- 15 Romy-Aylin Jatzko OH
- 16 Anastasia Cekulaev MB
- 17 Margareta Kozuch OH
- 18 Leana Grozer OH
- 19 Marie Hänle OP
- 20 Lena Kindermann OP
- 21 Camilla Weitzel MB
- 22 Monique Strubbe MB
- 23 Sarah Straube S
- 25 Rica Maase OP
- 26 Annegret Hölzig OH
- 30 Elena Kömmling OH
- 31 Lena Große Scharmann OP
- 32 Pia Fernau S
- 35 Luisa van Clewe MB
- 39 Lena Linke MB
- 43 Hannah Elisabeth Kohn S
- 46 Patricia Nestler U

== Italy ==
The following was Italy's roster at the 2024 Women's Volleyball Nations League.

Head coach: (Argentina) (Italy) Julio Velasco

- 1 Marina Lubian MB
- 2 Alice Degradi OH
- 3 Carlotta Cambi S
- 4 Francesca Bosio S
- 5 Ilaria Spirito L
- 6 Monica De Gennaro L
- 7 Eleonora Fersino L
- 8 Alessia Orro S
- 9 Caterina Bosetti OH
- 10 Linda Nkiruka Nwakalor MB
- 11 Anna Danesi MB
- 12 Alessia Mazzaro MB
- 13 Sara Bonifacio MB
- 14 Elena Pietrini OH
- 15 Sylvia Nwakalor OP
- 16 Stella Nervini OH
- 17 Miriam Sylla OH
- 18 Paola Ogechi Egonu OP
- 19 Sarah Fahr MB
- 20 Rebecca Piva OH
- 21 Oghosasere Loveth Omoruyi OH
- 23 Giulia Gennari S
- 24 Ekaterina Antropova OP
- 25 Yasmina Akrari MB
- 26 Martina Bracchi OH
- 27 Gaia Giovannini OH
- 28 Emma Graziani MB
- 29 Ilenia Moro L
- 30 Benedetta Maria Sartori MB

== Japan ==
The following was Japan's roster at the 2024 Women's Volleyball Nations League.

Head coach: (Japan) Masayoshi Manabe

- 1 Koyomi Iwasaki S
- 2 Kotona Hayashi OH
- 3 Sarina Koga OH
- 4 Mayu Ishikawa OH
- 5 Akane Yamagishi L
- 6 Nanami Seki S
- 7 Aya Watanabe MB
- 8 Manami Kojima L
- 9 Mizuki Tanaka OH
- 10 Arisa Inoue OH
- 11 Nichika Yamada MB
- 12 Satomi Fukudome L
- 13 Tamaki Matsui S
- 14 Fuyumi Hawi Okumu Oba OH
- 15 Airi Miyabe MB
- 16 Ai Kurogo OH
- 20 Ayaka Araki MB
- 21 Yukiko Wada OH

== Netherlands ==
The following was the Netherlands' roster at the 2024 Women's Volleyball Nations League.

Head coach: (Germany) Felix Koslowski

- 1 Kirsten Knip L
- 2 Fleur Savelkoel OH
- 3 Hester Jasper L
- 4 Celeste Plak OP
- 5 Jolien Knollema OH
- 6 Susan Schut OH
- 7 Juliët Lohuis MB
- 9 Pippa Molenaar L
- 10 Sarah Van Aalen S
- 11 Anne Buijs OH
- 12 Britt Bongaerts S
- 13 Nicole Van De Vosse OP
- 14 Laura Dijkema S
- 16 Indy Baijens MB
- 17 Iris Vos OH
- 18 Marrit Jasper OH
- 19 Nika Daalderop OH
- 21 Britte Stuut MB
- 22 Romy Brokking L
- 23 Eline Timmerman MB
- 24 Sanne Konijnenberg S
- 25 Florien Reesink L
- 26 Elles Dambrink OP
- 27 Iris Scholten OP
- 28 Hyke Lyklema S
- 29 Suus Gerritsen MB
- 30 Helena Kok OH
- 31 Laura Overwater MB
- 32 Marije Ten Brinke MB
- 33 Nova Marring OH

== Poland ==
The following was Poland's roster at the 2024 Women's Volleyball Nations League.

Head coach: (Italy) Stefano Lavarini

- 1 Maria Stenzel L
- 2 Aleksandra Rasinska OP
- 3 Klaudia Alagierska MB
- 4 Marlena Kowalewska S
- 5 Agnieszka Korneluk MB
- 6 Kamila Witkowska MB
- 7 Monika Gałkowska OP
- 8 Zuzanna Gorecka OH
- 9 Magdalena Stysiak OP
- 10 Monika Fedusio OH
- 11 Martyna Łukasik OH
- 12 Aleksandra Szczygłowska L
- 13 Paulina Maj-Erwardt L
- 14 Joanna Wołosz S
- 15 Martyna Czyrniańska OH
- 16 Justyna Lysiak L
- 17 Malwina Smarzek OP
- 18 Aleksandra Gryka MB
- 19 Weronika Centka MB
- 23 Dominika Pierzchała MB
- 24 Paulina Damaske OH
- 26 Katarzyna Wenerska S
- 27 Joanna Pacak MB
- 28 Julita Piasecka OH
- 30 Olivia Różański OH
- 41 Natalia Mędrzyk OH
- 62 Julia Nowicka S
- 81 Aleksandra Dudek OH
- 95 Magdalena Jurczyk MB
- 98 Julia Binczycka S

== Serbia ==
The following was Serbia's roster at the 2024 Women's Volleyball Nations League.

Head coach: (Italy) Giovanni Guidetti

- 2 Katarina Lazović OH
- 3 Minja Osmajic MB
- 6 Stefana Pakić L
- 7 Sara Rankovic S
- 7 Slađana Mirković S
- 9 Aleksandra Uzelac OH
- 10 Maja Ognjenović S
- 11 Hena Kurtagić MB
- 12 Teodora Pušić L
- 13 Ana Bjelica OP
- 16 Aleksandra Jegdić L
- 19 Bojana Milenković OH
- 20 Jovana Zelenovic OP
- 21 Ana Malešević MB
- 22 Sara Lozo OP
- 23 Milica Vidačić OP
- 24 Milica Medved L
- 25 Iva Šućurović MB
- 26 Masa Kirov MB
- 27 Vanja Bukilić OP
- 28 Marija Miljević S
- 29 Simona Mateska OH
- 30 Rada Perović S
- 31 Tara Taubner OP
- 32 Bojana Gocanin L
- 33 Jovana Cvetkovic OH
- 34 Branca Tica OH
- 35 Mina Mijatović OH
- 40 Vanja Ivanović OH
- 41 Natasa Čikuc-Deans MB

== South Korea ==
The following was South Korea's roster at the 2024 Women's Volleyball Nations League.

Head coach: (Puerto Rico) Fernando Morales

- 1 Lee So-young OH
- 2 Moon Jung-won L
- 3 Kim Da-in S
- 4 Han Da-hye L
- 5 Kim Chae-won L
- 6 Park Eun-jin MB
- 7 Kim Ji-won S
- 8 Kim Yeong-yeon L
- 9 Lee Ju-ah MB
- 10 Kang So-hwi OH
- 11 Choi Jeong-min MB
- 12 Lee Da-hyeon MB
- 13 Park Jeong-ah OH
- 14 Kim Se-been MB
- 15 Lee Seon-woo OP
- 16 Jeong Ji-yun OH
- 17 Jung Ho-young MB
- 18 Kim Dae-un OP
- 19 Pyo Seung-ju OH
- 20 Park Sa-rang S
- 21 Yuk Seo-young OP
- 22 Park Su-yeon OH
- 23 Lee Won-jeong S
- 24 Park Hye-jin S
- 25 Hwang Min-kyoung OH
- 26 Lee Han-bi OH
- 27 Bae Yoo-na MB
- 30 Yeum Hye-seon S
- 47 Han Su-jin L
- 71 Moon Ji-yun OP

== Thailand ==
The following was Thailand's roster at the 2024 Women's Volleyball Nations League.

Head coach: (Thailand) Nataphon Srisamutnak

- 1 Wipawee Srithong OH
- 2 Piyanut Pannoy L
- 3 Pornpun Guedpard S
- 4 Donphon Sinpho S
- 5 Thatdao Nuekjang MB
- 9 Jidapa Nahuanong L
- 11 Sasipapron Janthawisut OH
- 12 Hattaya Bamrungsuk MB
- 13 Kanokporn Sangthong S
- 15 Natthanicha Jaisaen S
- 16 Pimpichaya Kokram OP
- 18 Ajcharaporn Kongyot OH
- 19 Chatchu-on Moksri OH
- 20 Supattra Pairoj L
- 21 Thanacha Sooksod OP
- 23 Kuttika Kaewpin OH
- 24 Tichakorn Boonlert MB
- 29 Wimonrat Thanapan MB
- 99 Jarasporn Bundasak MB

== Turkey ==
The following was Turkey's roster at the 2024 Women's Volleyball Nations League.

Head coach: (Italy) Daniele Santarelli

- 1 Gizem Örge L
- 2 Simge Şebnem Aköz L
- 3 Cansu Özbay S
- 4 Melissa Vargas OP
- 5 Ayça Aykaç OH
- 6 Dilay Özdemir S
- 7 Hande Baladın OH
- 8 Yasemin Güveli MB
- 9 Meliha Diken OH
- 10 Tuğba Şenoğlu İvegin OH
- 11 Derya Cebecioğlu OH
- 12 Elif Şahin S
- 13 Aygun Bengisu MB
- 14 Eda Erdem Dündar MB
- 15 Deniz Uyanik MB
- 16 Saliha Şahin OH
- 18 Zehra Güneş MB
- 19 Aslı Kalaç MB
- 21 Beyza Arıcı MB
- 22 İlkin Aydın OH
- 23 Idil Naz Bascan OH
- 24 Melis Yılmaz L
- 25 Bahar Akbay MB
- 27 Tutku Burcu Yuzgenc OP
- 29 Defne Basyolcu OP
- 41 Alexia Căruțașu OP
- 44 Bianka Ilayda Mumcular OH
- 66 Kübra Akman MB
- 77 Sila Caliskan S
- 99 Ebrar Karakurt OP

== United States ==
The following was the United States' roster at the 2024 Women's Volleyball Nations League.

Head coach: (United States) Karch Kiraly

- 1 Micha Hancock S
- 2 Jordyn Poulter S
- 3 Avery Skinner OH
- 4 Justine Wong-Orantes L
- 5 Alexandra Frantti OH
- 6 Morgan Hentz L
- 7 Lauren Carlini S
- 8 Brionne Butler MB
- 9 Madisen Skinner OH
- 10 Jordan Larson OH
- 11 Andrea Drews OP
- 12 Jordan Thompson OP
- 13 Sarah Wilhite OH
- 14 Anna Hall MB
- 15 Haleigh Washington MB
- 16 Dana Rettke MB
- 17 Zoe Fleck L
- 18 Asjia O'Neal MB
- 19 Jenna Gray S
- 20 Danielle Cuttino OP
- 22 Kathryn Plummer OH
- 23 Kelsey Robinson Cook OH
- 24 Chiaka Ogbogu MB
- 26 Kendall White L
- 28 Ashley Evans S
- 29 Khalia Lanier OH
- 32 Kendall Kipp OP
- 37 Kayla Haneline MB
- 39 Taylor Mims OP
- 43 Serena Gray MB

== See also ==
- 2024 FIVB Men's Volleyball Nations League squads
- 2024 Summer Olympics men's team rosters
- 2024 Summer Olympics women's team rosters
