= Former Volleyball Casalmaggiore squads =

This article shows past squads from the Italian professional volleyball team Volleyball Casalmaggiore from the Serie A League.

== 2025–26 ==
2025–2026 Team
Number	Player	Position	Height (m)	Birth date
2	(Italy) Melissa Mattioli	Middle Blocker	2.02	19 August 2006 (age 20)
4	(Italy) Chiara Costagli (c)	Outside Hitter	1.88	17 July 1998 (age 28)
5	(Italy) Sofia Nosella	Outside Hitter	1.78	22 August 2006 (age 20)
7	(Italy) Martina Morandi	Libero	1.75	16 January 2002 (age 24)
8	(Puerto Rico) Valeria Vázquez Gómez	Outside Hitter	1.85	28 January 2001 (age 25)
9	(Italy) Giulia Neri	Setter	1.87	27 July 2001 (age 25)
10	(Italy) Alice Stafoggia	Outside Hitter	1.84	30 March 2002 (age 24)
~~11~~	(Portugal) ~~Júlia Kavalenka~~ (Note: Júlia Kavalenka left the team on 15 December 2025.)	~~Opposite~~	~~1.91~~	~~2 March 1999 (age 27)~~
11	(Croatia) Beta Dumančić (Note: Beta Dumančić joined the team on 25 December 2025.)	Middle Blocker	1.89	26 March 1991 (age 35)
12	(Italy) Melissa Marku	Middle Blocker	1.90	18 August 2004 (age 22)
13	(Italy) Laura Pasquino	Setter	1.81	9 January 2002 (age 24)
15	(Italy) Giorgia Faraone	Libero	1.68	6 July 1994 (age 32)
17	(Italy) Alexandra Ravarini	Opposite	1.84	8 July 2005 (age 21)
18	(Italy) Betsy Nwokoye	Middle Blocker	2.02	18 July 2005 (age 21)
22	(Italy) Rachele Rastelli (Note: Rachele Rastelli joined the team on 10 January 2026.)	Opposite	1.92	22 June 1999 (age 27)
88	(Slovakia) Linda Kovalčíková	Outside Hitter	1.80	1 August 2008 (age 18)

== 2024–25 ==
2024–2025 Team
Number	Player	Position	Height (m)	Birth date
1	(Italy) Sofia Nosella	Outside Hitter	1.78	22 August 2006 (age 20)
4	(Italy) Chiara Costagli	Outside Hitter	1.88	17 July 1998 (age 28)
5	(Italy) Martina Cantoni	Setter	1.85	21 October 2006 (age 19)
7	(Italy) Melissa Marku	Middle Blocker	1.90	18 August 2004 (age 22)
9	(Italy) Lucrezia Perletti	Middle Blocker	1.81	12 March 2005 (age 21)
10	(Italy) Giulia Pincerato (c)	Setter	1.82	16 March 1987 (age 39)
~~11~~	(Croatia) ~~Mika Grbavica~~ (Note: Mika Grbavica left the team on 20 November 2024.)	~~Outside Hitter~~	~~1.91~~	~~8 December 2001 (age 24)~~
12	(Colombia) Ivonee Montaño	Opposite	1.88	12 November 1995 (age 30)
13	(Italy) Alessandra Ribechi	Libero	1.68	29 May 2006 (age 20)
14	(Italy) Irene Bovolo (Note: Irene Bovolo joined the team on 11 December 2024.)	Outside Hitter	1.82	15 July 2002 (age 24)
15	(Italy) Giorgia Faraone	Libero	1.68	6 July 1994 (age 32)
16	(Italy) Francesca Dalla Rosa	Outside Hitter	1.78	4 May 1998 (age 28)
18	(Italy) Betsy Nwokoye	Middle Blocker	2.02	18 July 2005 (age 21)

== 2023–24 ==
2023–2024 Team
Number	Player	Position	Height (m)	Birth date
3	(Italy) Elena Perinelli (c)	Outside Hitter	1.81	27 June 1995 (age 31)
4	(Italy) Giorgia Avenia	Setter	1.80	4 April 1994 (age 32)
5	(Italy) Valentina Colombo	Middle Blocker	1.85	12 December 2003 (age 22)
7	(Netherlands) Juliët Lohuis	Middle Blocker	1.90	10 September 1996 (age 30)
~~9~~	(Italy) ~~Laura Melandri~~ (Note: Laura Melandri left the team on 23 October 2023.)	~~Middle Blocker~~	~~1.86~~	~~31 January 1995 (age 31)~~
10	(Italy) Linda Manfredini	Middle Blocker	1.86	14 May 2006 (age 20)
11	(Italy) Chiara De Bortoli	Libero	1.76	28 July 1997 (age 29)
12	(United States) Micha Hancock	Setter	1.80	10 November 1992 (age 33)
~~14~~	(United States) ~~Breana Edwards~~ (Note: Breana Edwards left the team on 19 March 2024.)	~~Outside Hitter~~	~~1.92~~	~~23 March 2000 (age 26)~~
15	(Italy) Giorgia Faraone	Libero	1.68	6 July 1994 (age 32)
16	(Italy) Josephine Obossa	Opposite	1.83	20 May 1999 (age 27)
17	(Poland) Malwina Smarzek	Opposite	1.91	3 June 1996 (age 30)
18	(Italy) Emma Cagnin	Outside Hitter	1.86	26 June 2002 (age 24)
~~21~~	(Venezuela) ~~Roslandy Acosta~~ (Note: Roslandy Acosta left the team on 29 November 2023.)	~~Outside Hitter~~	~~1.90~~	~~25 February 1992 (age 34)~~
22	(United States) Simone Lee (Note: Simone Lee joined the team in December 2023.)	Outside Hitter	1.88	7 September 1996 (age 30)

== 2022–23 ==
2022–2023 Team
Number	Player	Position	Height (m)	Birth date
1	(United States) Lauren Carlini	Setter	1.85	28 February 1995 (age 31)
2	(Italy) Francesca Scola	Setter	1.83	15 September 2001 (age 25)
3	(Italy) Elena Perinelli	Outside Hitter	1.81	27 June 1995 (age 31)
4	(Italy) Rebecca Piva	Outside Hitter	1.86	1 May 2001 (age 25)
5	(United States) Alexandra Frantti	Outside Hitter	1.85	3 March 1996 (age 30)
7	(Netherlands) Juliët Lohuis	Middle Blocker	1.90	10 September 1996 (age 30)
8	(United States) Courtney Buzzerio (Note: Courtney Buzzerio joined the team on 26 January 2023.)	Opposite	1.96	9 April 2000 (age 26)
9	(Italy) Laura Melandri	Middle Blocker	1.86	31 January 1995 (age 31)
10	(Italy) Adhuoljok Malual	Opposite	1.90	14 November 2000 (age 25)
11	(Italy) Chiara De Bortoli	Libero	1.76	28 July 1997 (age 29)
~~12~~	(Brazil) ~~Ellen Braga~~ (Note: Ellen Braga left the team on 13 January 2023.)	~~Outside Hitter~~	~~1.81~~	~~12 June 1991 (age 35)~~
14	(Bulgaria) Emiliya Dimitrova (c)	Opposite	1.87	26 December 1991 (age 34)
16	(Italy) Linda Mangani	Outside Hitter	1.84	16 February 2000 (age 26)
18	(Italy) Benedetta Sartori	Middle Blocker	1.87	14 April 2001 (age 25)

== 2021–22 ==
2021–2022 Team
Number	Player	Position	Height (m)	Birth date
1	(Italy) Martina Ferrara	Libero	1.68	28 January 1999 (age 27)
2	(Brazil) Ellen Braga	Outside Hitter	1.81	12 June 1991 (age 35)
3	(Italy) Marta Bechis (c)	Setter	1.80	4 September 1989 (age 37)
6	(Italy) Linda Mangani	Outside Hitter	1.84	16 February 2000 (age 26)
7	(Italy) Luna Veronica Carocci	Libero	1.74	10 July 1988 (age 38)
8	(Italy) Ludovica Guidi	Middle Blocker	1.86	17 December 1992 (age 33)
9	(United States) M'kaela White	Middle Blocker	1.93	5 January 1998 (age 28)
10	(Italy) Adhuoljok Malual	Opposite	1.90	14 November 2000 (age 25)
11	(Russia) Yana Shcherban	Outside Hitter	1.85	6 September 1989 (age 37)
13	(Hungary) Kinga Szűcs	Outside Hitter	1.80	8 June 1993 (age 33)
~~16~~	(Azerbaijan) ~~Katerina Zhidkova~~ (Note: Katerina Zhidkova left the team on 8 November 2021.)	~~Opposite~~	~~1.87~~	~~28 September 1989 (age 37)~~
17	(Italy) Erica Di Maulo	Outside Hitter	1.81	19 September 1997 (age 29)
18	(Italy) Marina Zambelli	Middle Blocker	1.87	1 January 1990 (age 36)
71	(Azerbaijan) Polina Rahimova	Opposite	1.98	5 June 1990 (age 36)

== 2020–21 ==
2020–2021 Team
Number	Player	Position	Height (m)	Birth date
2	(Italy) Federica Stufi (c)	Middle Blocker	1.85	22 March 1988 (age 38)
3	(United States) Carli Lloyd	Setter	1.80	6 August 1989 (age 37)
4	(Italy) Laura Partenio	Outside Hitter	1.83	29 December 1991 (age 34)
5	(Italy) Imma Sirressi	Libero	1.75	19 May 1990 (age 36)
6	(Italy) Francesca Bonciani	Setter	1.78	25 May 1992 (age 34)
7	(Brazil) Rosamaria Montibeller	Opposite	1.86	9 April 1994 (age 32)
8	(Italy) Marianna Maggipinto	Libero	1.64	5 January 1996 (age 30)
9	(Italy) Laura Melandri	Middle Blocker	1.86	31 January 1995 (age 31)
10	(Czech Republic) Tereza Vanžurová	Opposite	1.86	4 April 1991 (age 35)
11	(Italy) Michela Ciarrocchi	Middle Blocker	1.84	16 December 1999 (age 26)
14	(Brazil) Ananda Marinho	Setter	1.77	2 May 1989 (age 37)
15	(United States) Kara Bajema	Outside Hitter	1.88	24 March 1998 (age 28)
~~16~~	(Bulgaria) ~~Elitsa Vasileva~~ (Note: Elitsa Vasileva left the team on 27 November 2020.)	~~Outside Hitter~~	~~1.94~~	~~13 May 1990 (age 36)~~
18	(Italy) Dayana Kosareva	Outside Hitter	1.86	24 August 1999 (age 27)

== 2019–20 ==
2019–2020 Team
Number	Player	Position	Height (m)	Birth date
1	(Serbia) Mina Popović	Middle Blocker	1.87	16 September 1994 (age 32)
2	(Italy) Federica Stufi	Middle Blocker	1.85	22 March 1988 (age 38)
3	(Italy) Letizia Camera	Setter	1.75	1 October 1992 (age 34)
4	(Croatia) Lara Vukasović	Opposite	1.97	10 November 1994 (age 31)
5	(Italy) Ilaria Spirito	Libero	1.75	20 February 1994 (age 32)
7	(Italy) Alessia Fiesoli	Outside Hitter	1.85	25 May 1994 (age 32)
8	(Italy) Marianna Maggipinto	Libero	1.64	5 January 1996 (age 30)
9	(Italy) Caterina Bosetti (c)	Outside Hitter	1.80	2 February 1994 (age 32)
12	(Slovenia) Lana Ščuka	Outside Hitter	1.83	6 October 1996 (age 29)
14	(Cuba) Kenia Carcaces	Outside Hitter	1.89	23 January 1986 (age 40)
16	(Italy) Tiziana Veglia	Middle Blocker	1.86	13 September 1992 (age 34)
17	(Serbia) Ana Antonijević	Setter	1.85	26 August 1987 (age 39)
20	(United States) Danielle Cuttino	Opposite	1.94	22 June 1996 (age 30)

== 2018–19 ==
2018–2019 Team
Number	Player	Position	Height (m)	Birth date
3	(Poland) Katarzyna Skorupa (Note: Katarzyna Skorupa joined the team on 31 January 2019.)	Setter	1.84	16 September 1984 (age 42)
4	(Italy) Giulia Mio Bertolo	Middle Blocker	1.87	24 May 1995 (age 31)
5	(Italy) Ilaria Spirito	Libero	1.75	20 February 1994 (age 32)
6	(Italy) Silvia Lussana	Libero	1.69	30 October 1988 (age 37)
7	(Italy) Francesca Marcon	Outside Hitter	1.80	9 July 1983 (age 43)
8	(Canada) Alexa Gray	Outside Hitter	1.85	7 August 1994 (age 32)
9	(Italy) Caterina Bosetti	Outside Hitter	1.80	2 February 1994 (age 32)
10	(Serbia) Danica Radenković	Setter	1.85	9 October 1992 (age 33)
13	(Italy) Valentina Arrighetti (c)	Middle Blocker	1.89	26 January 1985 (age 41)
14	(Cuba) Kenia Carcaces	Outside Hitter	1.89	23 January 1986 (age 40)
15	(Poland) Agnieszka Korneluk	Middle Blocker	1.98	17 October 1994 (age 31)
16	(Italy) Giulia Pincerato	Setter	1.82	16 March 1987 (age 39)
~~17~~	(Azerbaijan) ~~Polina Rahimova~~ (Note: Polina Rahimova left the team on 26 January 2019.)	~~Opposite~~	~~1.98~~	~~5 June 1990 (age 36)~~
20	(United States) Danielle Cuttino	Opposite	1.94	22 June 1996 (age 30)

== 2017–18 ==
2017–2018 Team
Number	Player	Position	Height (m)	Birth date
1	(Dominican Republic) Brayelin Martinez	Outside Hitter	2.01	11 September 1996 (age 30)
~~2~~	(Canada) ~~Megan Cyr~~ (Note: Megan Cyr left the team on 12 December 2017.)	~~Setter~~	~~1.82~~	~~1 June 1990 (age 36)~~
3	(Italy) Francesca Napodano	Libero	1.75	17 January 1999 (age 27)
5	(Italy) Imma Sirressi	Libero	1.75	19 May 1990 (age 36)
6	(Netherlands) Maret Grothues (Note: Maret Grothues joined the team on 2 January 2018.)	Outside Hitter	1.80	16 September 1988 (age 38)
7	(Italy) Martina Guiggi	Middle Blocker	1.88	1 May 1984 (age 42)
~~8~~	(China) ~~Chunlei Zeng~~ (Note: Chunlei Zeng left the team on 28 November 2017.)	~~Opposite~~	~~1.89~~	~~3 November 1989 (age 36)~~
~~9~~	(Canada) ~~Sarah Pavan~~ (Note: Sarah Pavan left the team on 3 January 2018.)	~~Opposite~~	~~1.96~~	~~16 August 1986 (age 40)~~
10	(Croatia) Ana Starčević	Outside Hitter	1.80	24 March 1986 (age 40)
11	(United States) Andrea Drews (Note: Andrea Drews joined the team on 3 January 2018.)	Opposite	1.91	25 December 1993 (age 32)
12	(Italy) Anastasia Guerra	Outside Hitter	1.86	15 October 1996 (age 29)
13	(Italy) Valentina Zago	Opposite	1.87	21 February 1990 (age 36)
14	(Italy) Eleonora Lo Bianco	Setter	1.71	22 December 1979 (age 46)
15	(Serbia) Jovana Stevanović (c)	Middle Blocker	1.91	30 June 1992 (age 34)
17	(Italy) Giulia Rondon	Setter	1.90	16 October 1987 (age 38)
18	(Italy) Marina Zambelli	Middle Blocker	1.87	1 January 1990 (age 36)

== 2016–17 ==
2016–2017 Team
Number	Player	Position	Height (m)	Weight (kg)	Birth date
1	(Italy) Lucia Bacchi	Outside Hitter	1.81	69	4 January 1981 (age 45)
2	(Colombia) Lorena Zuleta (Note: Lorena Zuleta joined the team on 9 January 2017.)	Middle Blocker	1.92	70	16 January 1981 (age 45)
3	(United States) Carli Lloyd	Setter	1.80	75	6 August 1989 (age 37)
4	(Croatia) Klara Perić	Setter	1.84	71	30 March 1998 (age 28)
5	(Italy) Imma Sirressi	Libero	1.75	62	19 May 1990 (age 36)
6	(Romania) Carmen Țurlea	Opposite	1.85	69	18 November 1975 (age 50)
8	(United States) Lauren Gibbemeyer	Middle Blocker	1.87	71	8 September 1989 (age 37)
9	(Italy) Lucia Bosetti	Outside Hitter	1.75	61	9 July 1989 (age 37)
10	(Italy) Giulia Gibertini	Libero	1.72	57	30 September 1984 (age 42)
12	(Italy) Anastasia Guerra	Outside Hitter	1.86	72	15 October 1996 (age 29)
13	(Croatia) Samanta Fabris	Opposite	1.89	86	8 February 1992 (age 34)
15	(Serbia) Jovana Stevanović	Middle Blocker	1.91	70	30 June 1992 (age 34)
16	(Italy) Valentina Tirozzi	Outside Hitter	1.83	72	26 March 1986 (age 40)
~~18~~	(Croatia) ~~Tamara Sušić~~ (Note: Tamara Sušić left the team on 20 January 2017.)	~~Middle Blocker~~	~~1.92~~		~~28 November 1990 (age 35)~~

== 2015–16 ==
2015–2016 Team
Number	Player	Position	Height (m)	Weight (kg)	Birth date
1	(Italy) Lucia Bacchi	Outside Hitter	1.81	69	4 January 1981 (age 45)
3	(United States) Carli Lloyd	Setter	1.80	75	6 August 1989 (age 37)
5	(Italy) Imma Sirressi	Libero	1.75	62	19 May 1990 (age 36)
6	(Italy) Giada Cecchetto	Libero	1.63	54	6 June 1991 (age 35)
7	(Italy) Marianna Ferrara	Outside Hitter	1.78	67	29 October 1996 (age 29)
8	(United States) Lauren Gibbemeyer	Middle Blocker	1.87	71	8 September 1989 (age 37)
10	(Italy) Carlotta Cambi	Setter	1.76	70	28 May 1996 (age 30)
12	(Italy) Francesca Piccinini	Outside Hitter	1.85	62	10 January 1979 (age 47)
13	(Italy) Rossella Olivotto	Middle Blocker	1.84	65	27 April 1991 (age 35)
14	(Germany) Margareta Kozuch	Opposite	1.87	70	30 October 1986 (age 39)
15	(Serbia) Jovana Stevanović	Middle Blocker	1.91	70	30 June 1992 (age 34)
16	(Italy) Valentina Tirozzi	Outside Hitter	1.83	72	26 March 1986 (age 40)
17	(Czech Republic) Tereza Rossi	Opposite	1.92	78	3 December 1982 (age 43)

== 2014–15 ==
2014–2015 Team
Number	Player	Position	Height (m)	Weight (kg)	Birth date
1	(Italy) Serena Ortolani	Opposite	1.87	67	7 January 1987 (age 39)
3	(Poland) Katarzyna Skorupa	Setter	1.83	73	16 September 1984 (age 42)
4	(Italy) Marika Bianchini	Opposite	1.78	68	23 April 1993 (age 33)
5	(Italy) Imma Sirressi	Libero	1.75	62	19 May 1990 (age 36)
6	(Italy) Alessia Gennari	Outside Hitter	1.84	68	3 November 1991 (age 34)
7	(Italy) Geraldina Quiligotti	Libero	1.67	58	16 October 1994 (age 31)
8	(United States) Lauren Gibbemeyer	Middle Blocker	1.87	71	8 September 1989 (age 37)
9	(Italy) Beatrice Agrifoglio	Setter	1.78	66	1 January 1994 (age 32)
10	(Belarus) Vera Klimovich	Middle Blocker	1.85	74	29 April 1988 (age 38)
~~13~~	(Italy) ~~Valentina Zago~~ (Note: Valentina Zago left the team on 13 January 2015.)	~~Opposite~~	~~1.86~~	~~77~~	~~21 February 1990 (age 36)~~
15	(Serbia) Jovana Stevanović	Middle Blocker	1.91	70	30 June 1992 (age 34)
16	(Italy) Valentina Tirozzi	Outside Hitter	1.83	72	26 March 1986 (age 40)

== 2013–14 ==
2013–2014 Team
Number	Player	Position	Height (m)	Weight (kg)	Birth date
1	(Italy) Lucia Bacchi	Outside Hitter	1.81	69	4 January 1981 (age 45)
2	(Italy) Taismary Agüero (Note: Taismary Agüero joined the team on 5 February 2014.)	Opposite	1.77	68	5 March 1977 (age 49)
3	(Italy) Rossella Olivotto	Middle Blocker	1.84	65	27 April 1991 (age 35)
5	(Italy) Imma Sirressi	Libero	1.75	62	19 May 1990 (age 36)
6	(Italy) Alessia Gennari	Outside Hitter	1.84	68	3 November 1991 (age 34)
7	(Italy) Geraldina Quiligotti	Libero	1.67	58	16 October 1994 (age 31)
8	(Uruguay) Florencia Aguirre	Middle Blocker	1.93	71	14 May 1989 (age 37)
9	(Italy) Beatrice Agrifoglio	Setter	1.78	66	1 January 1994 (age 32)
11	(Slovenia) Tina Lipicer	Outside Hitter	1.81	67	19 June 1981 (age 45)
12	(Italy) Letizia Camera	Setter	1.75	63	1 October 1992 (age 34)
13	(Italy) Valentina Zago	Opposite	1.86	77	21 February 1990 (age 36)
15	(Serbia) Jovana Stevanović	Middle Blocker	1.91	70	30 June 1992 (age 34)
16	(Italy) Giuliana Grazietti	Middle Blocker	1.96	76	21 April 1993 (age 33)
