= Volleyball at the 2024 Summer Olympics – Women's team rosters =

This article shows the roster of all participating teams for the women's indoor volleyball tournament at the 2024 Summer Olympics.

== Pool A ==
=== China ===
The roster was announced on 29 June 2024.

Head coach: Cai Bin

- 1 Yuan Xinyue (c) MB
- 2 Zhu Ting OH
- 3 Diao Linyu S
- 5 Gao Yi MB
- 6 Gong Xiangyu OP
- 7 Wang Yuanyuan MB
- 9 Zhang Changning OH
- 12 Li Yingying OH
- 14 Zheng Yixin OP
- 16 Ding Xia S
- 18 Wang Mengjie L
- 21 Wu Mengjie OH

=== France ===
The roster was announced on 8 July 2024.

Head coach: (Belgium) Émile Rousseaux

- 1 Héléna Cazaute (c) OH
- 3 Amandine GiardinoL
- 4 Christina Bauer MB
- 7 Iman Ndiaye OP
- 9 Nina Stojiljković S
- 11 Lucille Gicquel OP
- 15 Amandha Marine Sylves MB
- 23 Léandra Olinga-Andela MB
- 63 Émilie Respaut S
- 88 Amélie Rotar OH
- 91 Halimatou Bah OH
- 99 Juliette Gelin L

=== Serbia ===
The roster was announced on 9 July 2024.

Head coach: (Italy) Giovanni Guidetti

- 1 Bianka Buša OH
- 2 Katarina Lazović OH
- 4 Bojana Drča S
- 5 Mina Popović MB
- 9 Aleksandra Uzelac OH
- 10 Maja Ognjenović (c) S
- 14 Maja Aleksić MB
- 15 Jovana Stevanović MB
- 17 Silvija Popović L
- 18 Tijana Bošković OP
- 19 Bojana Milenković OH
- 22 Sara Lozo OP

=== United States ===
The roster was announced on 5 June 2024.

Head coach: Karch Kiraly

- 2 Jordyn Poulter S
- 3 Avery Skinner OH
- 4 Justine Wong-Orantes L
- 7 Lauren Carlini S
- 10 Jordan Larson (c) OH
- 11 Annie Drews OP
- 12 Jordan Thompson OP
- 15 Haleigh Washington MB
- 16 Dana Rettke MB
- 22 Kathryn Plummer OH
- 23 Kelsey Robinson Cook OH
- 24 Chiaka Ogbogu MB

== Pool B ==
=== Brazil ===
The roster was announced on 4 July 2024.

Head coach: Zé Roberto

- 1 Nyeme Costa L
- 2 Diana Duarte MB
- 3 Macris Carneiro S
- 6 Thaísa Menezes MB
- 7 Rosamaria Montibeller OH
- 9 Roberta Ratzke S
- 10 Gabriela Guimarães (c) OH
- 12 Ana Cristina de Souza OH
- 15 Ana Carolina da Silva MB
- 17 Júlia Bergmann OH
- 19 Tainara Santos OP
- 24 Lorenne Teixeira OP

=== Japan ===
The roster was announced on 1 July 2024.

Head coach: Masayoshi Manabe

- 1 Koyomi Iwasaki S
- 2 Kotona Hayashi OH
- 3 Sarina Koga (c) OH
- 4 Mayu Ishikawa OH
- 6 Nanami Seki S
- 8 Manami Kojima L
- 10 Arisa Inoue OH
- 11 Nichika Yamada MB
- 12 Satomi Fukudome L
- 15 Airi Miyabe MB
- 20 Ayaka Araki MB
- 21 Yukiko Wada OH

=== Kenya ===
The roster was announced on 9 July 2024.

Head coach: Japheth Munala

- 1 Esther Mutinda S
- 2 Veronica Oluoch OH
- 3 Pamella Owino OP
- 4 Leonida Kasaya OH
- 6 Belinda Barasa MB
- 7 Emmaculate Misoki S
- 8 Trizah Atuka (c) MB
- 11 Loise Simiyu OP
- 13 Juliana Namutira OH
- 15 Lorine Kaei MB
- 16 Agripina Kundu L
- 19 Edith Mukuvilani MB

=== Poland ===
The roster was announced on 6 July 2024.

Head coach: (Italy) Stefano Lavarini

- 1 Maria Stenzel L
- 3 Klaudia Alagierska MB
- 5 Agnieszka Korneluk MB
- 9 Magdalena Stysiak OP
- 11 Martyna Łukasik OH
- 12 Aleksandra Szczygłowska L
- 14 Joanna Wołosz (c) S
- 15 Martyna Czyrniańska OH
- 17 Malwina Smarzek OP
- 26 Katarzyna Wenerska S
- 41 Natalia Mędrzyk OH
- 95 Magdalena Jurczyk MB

== Pool C ==
=== Dominican Republic ===
The roster was announced on 8 July 2024.

On July 26, Lisvel Elisa Eve was suspended from the tournament after admitting to take a medication that contained furosemide. She was then replaced by the alternate player, Geraldine González.

Head coach: (Brazil) Marcos Kwiek

- 1 Cándida Arias MB
- 5 Brenda Castillo L
- 6 Ariana Rodríguez S
- 7 Niverka Marte (c) S
- 8 Alondra Tapia OP
- 11 Geraldine González MB
- 15 Madeline Guillén OH
- 16 Yonkaira Peña OH
- 18 Bethania de la Cruz OH
- 20 Brayelin Martínez OH
- 21 Jineiry Martínez MB
- 23 Gaila González OP

=== Italy ===
The roster was announced on 8 July 2024.

Head coach: (Argentina) (Italy) Julio Velasco

- 1 Marina Lubian MB
- 3 Carlotta Cambi S
- 6 Monica De Gennaro L
- 8 Alessia Orro S
- 9 Caterina Bosetti OH
- 11 Anna Danesi (c) MB
- 17 Myriam Sylla OH
- 18 Paola Egonu OP
- 19 Sarah Fahr MB
- 21 Loveth Omoruyi OH
- 24 Ekaterina Antropova OP
- 27 Gaia Giovannini OH

=== Netherlands ===
The roster was announced on 6 July 2024.

Head coach: (Germany) Felix Koslowski

- 4 Celeste Plak OP
- 5 Jolien Knollema OH
- 7 Juliët Lohuis MB
- 10 Sarah van Aalen S
- 11 Anne Buijs OH
- 12 Britt Bongaerts S
- 16 Indy Baijens MB
- 18 Marrit Jasper OH
- 19 Nika Daalderop (c) OH
- 23 Eline Timmerman MB
- 25 Florien Reesink L
- 26 Elles Dambrink OP

=== Turkey ===
The roster was announced on 8 July 2024.

Head coach: (Italy) Daniele Santarelli

- 1 Gizem Örge L
- 3 Cansu Özbay S
- 4 Melissa Vargas OP
- 7 Hande Baladın OH
- 9 Meliha Diken OH
- 11 Derya Cebecioğlu OH
- 12 Elif Şahin S
- 14 Eda Erdem Dündar (c) MB
- 18 Zehra Güneş MB
- 19 Aslı Kalaç MB
- 22 İlkin Aydın OH
- 99 Ebrar Karakurt OH

== See also ==
- Volleyball at the 2024 Summer Olympics – Men's team rosters
