= Chieri '76 Volleyball =

Italian volleyball club

Chieri '76
- Full name: Chieri ’76 Volleyball
- Founded: 2009
- Ground: PalaMaddalene, Chieri, Italy (Capacity: 1,200)
- Chairman: Filippo Vergnano
- Head coach: Nicola Negro
- League: FIPAV Women's Serie A1
- Website: Club home page

Uniforms
Home	Away

Chieri ’76 Volleyball is an Italian professional women's volleyball club based in Chieri and currently playing in the Serie A1.

== Previous names ==
Due to sponsorship, the club have competed under the following names:

- Chieri '76 Carol's (2009–2010)
- Familia Habimat Chieri (2010–2012)
- Fenera Chieri (2013–2018)
- Reale Mutua Fenera Chieri (2018–present)

== History ==
As part of the In Alto Chieri association, the club was officially established on 14 May 2009 and named after Chieri Volley (also known as Pallavolo Chieri and Chieri Torino). The origins of In Alto Chieri dates back from the late 1990s, when Chieri Volley, the traditional professional women's volleyball club of the town and InVolley, another local volleyball club, started a project on which Chieri focused on the professional team and InVolley on the youth teams. Soon after more local clubs joined in and the In Alto Chieri association was established in 2004. When the association acquired a Serie B2 licence and assets from Carol's Volley in 2009, the club was formed and named Chieri '76 Carol's. The debut came in the 2009–10 Serie B2 and in the following season the club was promoted to Serie B1. At the end of the 2014–15 season, after four seasons in Serie B1, the club received a place in Serie A2 due to withdraw from other clubs.

On 28 September 2015, the club changed its name to Chieri ’76 Volleyball and due to sponsorship it is also known as Fenera Chieri. On 8 June 2016, the In Alto Chieri association becomes the In alto col Chieri ’76 consortium, with the club being one of its seven members which are all located in the South and South East of Turin. The consortium is designed to strength women's volleyball in the region by offering a channel where players can be developed from young age up to professional level locally.

In 2018, Chieri ’76 won the Serie A2 playoffs and got promoted to Serie A1 for the 2018–19 season. In 2023, Chieri ’76 was the CEV Challenge Cup champions and the following season, the club won the 2023–24 CEV Cup.

== Team ==
2026–2027 Team
Number	Player	Position	Height (m)	Birth date
3	(Italy) Alessia Regoni	Libero	1.71	20 March 2006 (age 20)
5	(Italy) Ilaria Spirito (c)	Libero	1.75	20 February 1994 (age 32)
6	(United States) Reagan Cooper	Outside Hitter	1.85	4 November 2000 (age 26)
7	(Italy) Katja Eckl	Middle Blocker	1.88	6 May 2003 (age 23)
~~8~~	(Netherlands) ~~Britte Stuut~~ (Note: Britte Stuut left the team on 25 October 2026.)	~~Middle Blocker~~	~~1.98~~	~~11 January 2003 (age 23)~~
9	(Italy) Marina Lubian	Middle Blocker	1.92	11 April 2000 (age 26)
10	(Netherlands) Sarah Van Aalen	Setter	1.82	21 January 2000 (age 26)
11	(Italy) Stella Nervini	Outside Hitter	1.84	10 September 2003 (age 23)
12	(Italy) Marina Giacomello	Opposite	1.90	1 April 2004 (age 22)
13	(Hungary) Anett Németh	Opposite	1.88	13 December 1999 (age 26)
15	(Germany) Corina Glaab	Setter	1.78	25 May 2000 (age 26)
17	(Italy) Anna Gray	Middle Blocker	1.87	15 November 1996 (age 30)
18	(Italy) Yasmina Akrari	Middle Blocker	1.85	31 August 1993 (age 33)
21	(Canada) Abagayle Guezen	Outside Hitter	1.90	28 September 2005 (age 21)
33	(United States) Logan Eggleston	Outside Hitter	1.85	13 November 2000 (age 26)

2025–2026 Team
Number	Player	Position	Height (m)	Birth date
1	(Croatia) Karla Antunović	Setter	1.83	27 March 2002 (age 24)
2	(Italy) Alice Degradi	Outside Hitter	1.81	10 April 1996 (age 30)
4	(Switzerland) Laura Dervisaj-Künzler	Outside Hitter	1.89	25 December 1996 (age 29)
5	(Italy) Ilaria Spirito (c)	Libero	1.75	20 February 1994 (age 32)
7	(Italy) Sofia Ferrarini	Middle Blocker	1.85	2 June 2001 (age 25)
8	(Italy) Carola Bonafede	Libero	1.75	16 January 2007 (age 19)
9	(Italy) Sara Alberti	Middle Blocker	1.85	3 January 1993 (age 33)
10	(Netherlands) Sarah Van Aalen	Setter	1.82	21 January 2000 (age 26)
11	(Italy) Stella Nervini	Outside Hitter	1.84	10 September 2003 (age 23)
12	(France) Halimatou Bah	Outside Hitter	1.87	21 December 2003 (age 22)
13	(Hungary) Anett Németh	Opposite	1.88	13 December 1999 (age 26)
14	(Germany) Anastasia Cekulaev	Middle Blocker	1.91	1 July 2003 (age 23)
15	(Netherlands) Elles Dambrink	Opposite	1.87	22 June 2003 (age 23)
17	(Italy) Anna Gray	Middle Blocker	1.87	15 November 1996 (age 30)
~~23~~	(Italy) ~~Silvia Lotti~~ (Note: Silvia Lotti left the team on 9 December 2025.)	~~Outside Hitter~~	~~1.85~~	~~17 June 1992 (age 34)~~

2024–2025 Team
Number	Player	Position	Height (m)	Birth date
2	(Argentina) Martina Bednarek (Note: Martina Bednarek joined the team on 23 December 2024.)	Outside Hitter	1.87	21 July 2006 (age 20)
5	(Italy) Ilaria Spirito (c)	Libero	1.75	20 February 1994 (age 32)
6	(United States) Avery Skinner	Outside Hitter	1.86	25 April 1999 (age 27)
7	(Russia) Anastasia Lyashko	Middle Blocker	1.98	17 February 2005 (age 21)
9	(Italy) Sara Alberti	Middle Blocker	1.85	3 January 1993 (age 33)
10	(Netherlands) Sarah Van Aalen	Setter	1.82	21 January 2000 (age 26)
11	(Greece) Martha Anthouli	Opposite	2.02	13 August 2002 (age 24)
12	(Netherlands) Anne Buijs	Outside Hitter	1.91	2 December 1991 (age 34)
13	(France) Lucille Gicquel	Opposite	1.89	13 November 1997 (age 29)
14	(Italy) Elena Rolando	Libero	1.65	16 July 1999 (age 27)
15	(Italy) Federica Carletti	Outside Hitter	1.84	14 March 2000 (age 26)
16	(Cyprus) Katerina Zakchaiou	Middle Blocker	1.92	26 July 1998 (age 28)
17	(Italy) Anna Gray	Middle Blocker	1.87	15 November 1996 (age 30)
21	(Italy) Loveth Omoruyi	Outside Hitter	1.84	25 August 2002 (age 24)
22	(Italy) Gaia Guiducci	Setter	1.78	9 March 2002 (age 24)

2023–2024 Team
Number	Player	Position	Height (m)	Birth date
3	(Italy) Elena Rolando	Libero	1.65	16 July 1999 (age 27)
4	(Italy) Rachele Morello	Setter	1.82	7 November 2000 (age 26)
5	(Italy) Ilaria Spirito	Libero	1.75	20 February 1994 (age 32)
6	(United States) Avery Skinner	Outside Hitter	1.86	25 April 1999 (age 27)
~~7~~	(Italy) ~~Valeria Papa~~ (Note: Valeria Papa left the team on 26 January 2024.)	~~Outside Hitter~~	~~1.83~~	~~9 September 1989 (age 37)~~
7	(Germany) Romy Jatzko (Note: Romy Jatzko joined the team on 2 February 2024.)	Outside Hitter	1.87	26 January 2000 (age 26)
8	(Belgium) Kaja Grobelna (c)	Opposite	1.88	4 January 1995 (age 31)
9	(United States) Madison Kingdon Rishel	Outside Hitter	1.85	20 April 1993 (age 33)
11	(Greece) Martha Anthouli	Opposite	2.02	13 August 2002 (age 24)
12	(Italy) Anna Gray	Middle Blocker	1.87	15 November 1996 (age 30)
14	(Italy) Fatim Kone	Middle Blocker	1.82	25 October 2000 (age 26)
15	(Italy) Loveth Omoruyi	Outside Hitter	1.84	25 August 2002 (age 24)
16	(Cyprus) Katerina Zakchaiou	Middle Blocker	1.92	26 July 1998 (age 28)
17	(Germany) Camilla Weitzel	Middle Blocker	1.95	11 June 2000 (age 26)
23	(Italy) Ofelia Malinov	Setter	1.85	29 February 1996 (age 30)

2022–2023 Team
Number	Player	Position	Height (m)	Birth date
1	(France) Héléna Cazaute	Outside Hitter	1.84	17 December 1997 (age 28)
2	(Italy) Rachele Morello	Setter	1.82	7 November 2000 (age 26)
3	(Poland) Olivia Różański	Outside Hitter	1.85	5 June 1997 (age 29)
4	(Italy) Francesca Bosio	Setter	1.80	7 August 1997 (age 29)
5	(Italy) Ilaria Spirito	Libero	1.75	20 February 1994 (age 32)
6	(Italy) Alessia Fini	Libero	1.70	3 August 2004 (age 22)
7	(Italy) Stella Nervini	Outside Hitter	1.84	10 September 2003 (age 23)
8	(Belgium) Kaja Grobelna (c)	Opposite	1.88	4 January 1995 (age 31)
9	(Italy) Francesca Villani	Outside Hitter	1.87	30 May 1995 (age 31)
10	(United States) Brionne Butler	Middle Blocker	1.94	29 January 1999 (age 27)
11	(Switzerland) Maja Storck	Opposite	1.83	8 October 1998 (age 28)
12	(Italy) Alessia Mazzaro	Middle Blocker	1.85	19 September 1998 (age 28)
14	(Italy) Fatim Kone	Middle Blocker	1.82	25 October 2000 (age 26)
~~16~~	~~Marie-France Garreau Djé~~ (Note: Marie-France Garreau Djé left the team on 31 December 2022.)	~~Middle Blocker~~	~~1.81~~	~~4 October 1992 (age 34)~~
17	(Germany) Camilla Weitzel	Middle Blocker	1.95	11 June 2000 (age 26)

2021–2022 Team
Number	Player	Position	Height (m)	Birth date
1	(United States) Rhamat Alhassan	Middle Blocker	1.95	7 September 1996 (age 30)
2	(France) Héléna Cazaute	Outside Hitter	1.84	17 December 1997 (age 28)
3	(Italy) Elena Perinelli (c)	Outside Hitter	1.81	27 June 1995 (age 31)
4	(Italy) Francesca Bosio	Setter	1.80	7 August 1997 (age 29)
5	(United States) Alexandra Frantti	Outside Hitter	1.85	3 March 1996 (age 30)
6	(Italy) Anna Piovesan	Outside Hitter	1.86	27 March 2004 (age 22)
7	(Italy) Asia Bonelli	Setter	1.81	4 September 2000 (age 26)
8	(Belgium) Kaja Grobelna	Opposite	1.88	4 January 1995 (age 31)
9	(Italy) Francesca Villani	Outside Hitter	1.87	30 May 1995 (age 31)
10	(Italy) Chiara De Bortoli	Libero	1.76	28 July 1997 (age 29)
12	(Italy) Alessia Mazzaro	Middle Blocker	1.85	19 September 1998 (age 28)
14	(Turkey) Yağmur Karaoğlu	Opposite	1.93	21 August 2001 (age 25)
15	(Italy) Martina Armini	Libero	1.75	19 September 2002 (age 24)
17	(Germany) Camilla Weitzel	Middle Blocker	1.95	11 June 2000 (age 26)
18	(Italy) Francesca Guarena	Middle Blocker	1.93	9 October 2003 (age 23)

2020–2021 Team
Number	Player	Position	Height (m)	Birth date
1	(United States) Rhamat Alhassan	Middle Blocker	1.95	7 September 1996 (age 30)
3	(Italy) Elena Perinelli (c)	Outside Hitter	1.81	27 June 1995 (age 31)
4	(Italy) Francesca Bosio	Setter	1.80	7 August 1997 (age 29)
5	(United States) Alexandra Frantti	Outside Hitter	1.85	3 March 1996 (age 30)
6	(Argentina) Victoria Mayer	Setter	1.80	19 June 2001 (age 25)
7	(Italy) Giulia Gibertini	Libero	1.72	30 September 1984 (age 42)
8	(Belgium) Kaja Grobelna	Opposite	1.88	4 January 1995 (age 31)
9	(Italy) Francesca Villani	Outside Hitter	1.87	30 May 1995 (age 31)
10	(Italy) Chiara De Bortoli	Libero	1.76	28 July 1997 (age 29)
11	(Estonia) Kertu Laak	Opposite	1.88	21 February 1998 (age 28)
12	(Italy) Alessia Mazzaro	Middle Blocker	1.85	19 September 1998 (age 28)
18	(Italy) Marina Zambelli	Middle Blocker	1.87	1 January 1990 (age 36)
21	(Netherlands) Annick Meijers	Outside Hitter	1.88	23 March 2000 (age 26)

2019–2020 Team
Number	Player	Position	Height (m)	Birth date
1	(United States) Jordyn Poulter	Setter	1.88	31 July 1997 (age 29)
3	(Italy) Elena Perinelli	Outside Hitter	1.81	27 June 1995 (age 31)
4	(Italy) Francesca Bosio	Setter	1.80	7 August 1997 (age 29)
5	(United States) Amber Rolfzen	Middle Blocker	1.91	25 August 1994 (age 32)
6	(Italy) Alessia Lanzini	Libero	1.65	28 August 1981 (age 45)
7	(Puerto Rico) Stephanie Enright (c)	Outside Hitter	1.79	15 December 1990 (age 35)
8	(Belgium) Kaja Grobelna	Opposite	1.88	4 January 1995 (age 31)
10	(Italy) Chiara De Bortoli	Libero	1.76	28 July 1997 (age 29)
11	(Estonia) Kertu Laak	Opposite	1.88	21 February 1998 (age 28)
12	(Italy) Anastasia Guerra	Outside Hitter	1.86	15 October 1996 (age 30)
18	(Italy) Yasmina Akrari	Middle Blocker	1.85	31 August 1993 (age 33)
19	(Italy) Alessia Mazzaro	Middle Blocker	1.85	19 September 1998 (age 28)
21	(Netherlands) Annick Meijers	Outside Hitter	1.88	23 March 2000 (age 26)

2018–2019 Team
Number	Player	Position	Height (m)	Birth date
1	(Italy) Giulia Bresciani	Libero	1.65	27 September 1992 (age 34)
2	(United States) Jordyn Poulter (Note: Jordyn Poulter joined the team in January 2019.)	Setter	1.88	31 July 1997 (age 29)
3	(Italy) Elena Perinelli	Outside Hitter	1.81	27 June 1995 (age 31)
5	(Italy) Giorgia Caforio	Libero	1.68	16 September 1994 (age 32)
6	(Croatia) Barbara Đapić	Opposite	1.94	11 March 1995 (age 31)
7	(Croatia) Ana Starčević (Note: Ana Starčević joined the team in early February 2019.)	Outside Hitter	1.80	24 March 1986 (age 40)
~~8~~	(Italy) ~~Chiara Scacchetti~~ (Note: Chiara Scacchetti left the team on 20 January 2019.)	~~Setter~~	~~1.80~~	~~10 December 1995 (age 30)~~
~~9~~	(Azerbaijan) ~~Odina Aliyeva~~ (Note: Odina Aliyeva left the team on 1 February 2019.)	~~Outside Hitter~~	~~1.86~~	~~25 May 1990 (age 36)~~
10	(Cuba) Giselle Silva	Opposite	1.90	29 October 1991 (age 35)
11	(Italy) Elisa Tonello	Outside Hitter	1.76	22 April 2000 (age 26)
12	(Italy) Giulia Angelina	Outside Hitter	1.92	26 February 1997 (age 29)
13	(United States) Samantha Middleborn	Middle Blocker	1.88	10 November 1990 (age 36)
16	(Belarus) Anzhelika Barysevic	Middle Blocker	1.92	20 July 1995 (age 31)
17	(Italy) Sara De Lellis (c)	Setter	1.81	14 November 1986 (age 40)
18	(Italy) Yasmina Akrari	Middle Blocker	1.85	31 August 1993 (age 33)

== Head coaches ==
Period	Head coach
2010–2016	(Italy) Massimiliano Gallo
2016–2017	(Italy) Ettore Guidetti
2017–2017	(Italy) Ivana Druetti
2017–2019	(Italy) Luca Secchi
2019–2019	(Italy) Marco Sinibaldi
2019–2025	(Italy) Giulio Bregoli
2025–	(Italy) Nicola Negro

== Honours ==
=== International competitions ===
- CEV Cup: 1

2023–24

- CEV Challenge Cup: 1

2022–23

== Venue ==
The club play its home matches at the PalaMaddalene in Chieri. The venue has a 1,200 spectators capacity.
