= Radostina Marinova =

Bulgarian volleyball player (born 1998)

Radostina Marinova (born 2 October 1998) is a Bulgarian volleyball player who plays as an outside hitter and an opposite for the Bulgaria women's national volleyball team.

== Career ==
She participated with Bulgaria's national team at the 2019 FIVB Volleyball Women's Nations League, 2022 FIVB Volleyball Women's Nations League, and the 2022 FIVB Volleyball Women's World Championship.

She played for California State University, Long Beach. At club level, she plays for Saint-Cloud Paris Stade Français.
