= Ilaria Spirito =

Italian volleyball player (born 1994)

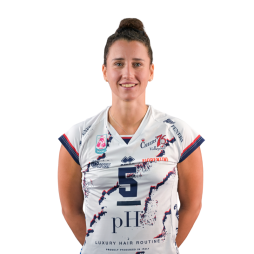
- Spirito with Chieri '76

Personal information
- Born: 20 February 1994 (age 32); Albisola Superiore, Liguria, Italy
- Height: 1.74 m (5 ft 9 in)

Volleyball information
- Position: Libero
- Current club: Chieri '76
- Number: 5

Career
Years
- 2008–2009
- 2009–2010
- 2010–2014
- 2014–2016
- 2016–2017
- 2017–2018
- 2018–2020
- 2020–2021
- 2021–2022
- 2022–
Teams
- Albisola
- Lanterna Genova
- Busto Arsizio
- Club Italia
- Busto Arsizio
- UYBA
- Casalmaggiore
- Club Roma
- Cuneo Granda
- Chieri '76

National team
Italy
Honours
Women's volleyball
Representing Italy
Olympic Games
Gold medal – first place	2024 Paris	Team
FIVB Nations League
Gold medal – first place	2024 Bangkok	Team
Bronze medal – third place	2026 Macau	Team
European Championship
Silver medal – second place	2026 Azerbaijan-Czechia-Sweden-Turkey	Team

Ilaria Spirito (born 20 February 1994) is an Italian volleyball player who plays for Chieri '76 as libero with jersey number 5.

== Career ==
=== Clubs ===
Spirito's career began in 2008 in Albisola, in Serie C, while in the following year she played for Lanterna Volley Genova, in Serie B1. In the 2010–11 season she was signed by Busto Arsizio with whom she played in the Serie B2 championship and then, from the 2012–13 season, in Serie B1. In this period of time she still obtained some sporadic call-ups to the team that plays in Serie A1, where she entered permanently from the 2013–14 season.

For the 2014–15 season, Spirito was part of the team of Club Italia, in Serie A2, where she remained for two years. In the 2016–17 season she returned to the club Busto Arsizio, where she remained for two years, during which it was renamed UYBA.

In the 2018–19 season, Spirito moved to Casalmaggiore, still in Serie A1, and then signed with Club Roma for the 2020–21 season, in Serie A2, with whom she was promoted to the top division, where, in the following championship, she participated with Cuneo Granda. In the 2022–23 season she moved to Chieri '76, still in the top division, with whom she won the WEVZA Cup, the Challenge Cup and, in the following season, the CEV Cup.

=== National team ===
With the under 19 national team, Spirito won the bronze medal at the 2012 Women's Junior European Volleyball Championship.

In 2015, Spirito received her first call-ups to the senior national team, with whom she won gold at the Volleyball Nations League in 2024.

== Awards ==
=== National team ===
- 2024 Nations League – Gold medal
- 2024 Olympic Games – Gold medal

=== Clubs ===
- 2022 WEVZA Cup – Champion, with Chieri '76
- 2022–23 Challenge Cup – Champion, with Chieri '76
- 2023–24 Women's CEV Cup – Champion, with Chieri '76
