= Olivia Różański =

Polish volleyball player (born 1997)

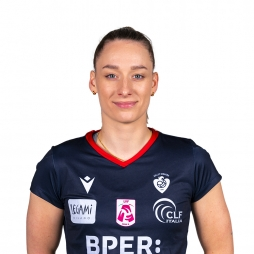
- Różański in 2023

Personal information
- Nationality: Polish
- Born: 5 June 1997 (age 29) Albi, France
- Height: 185 cm (73 in)
- Weight: 74 kg (163 lb)
- Spike: 315 cm (124 in)
- Block: 300 cm (118 in)

Volleyball information
- Position: Outside Hitter
- Number: 10 (club)

Career
- Years: Team
- Albi-USSP (youth)
- 2014–2017: JKS SMS Jastrzębie (youth)
- 2014–2017: SMS PZPS Szczyrk (youth)
- 2017–2020: BKS Bielsko-Biała
- 2020–2022: Legionovia Legionowo
- 2022–2023: Chieri 76
- 2023–2024: Volley Bergamo 1991
- 2024–2025: Beşiktaş JK
- 2025–: Gunma Green Wings

National team
- Years: Team
- 2015: Poland B
- 2018–: Poland
Medal record
Volleyball
Bronze medal – third place	2023 Arlington	Team
Bronze medal – third place	2024 Bangkok	Team

Olivia Różański (born 5 June 1997) is a French-born Polish professional indoor volleyball player who plays as an Outside Hitter. She has won bronze medal at the 2023 FIVB Volleyball Women's Nations League with the Poland women's national volleyball team and she is the daughter of the former volleyball player Jarosława Różańska.

== Career ==
=== Club ===
==== Youth ====
She started her career at hometown club Albi-USSP.

After moving to Poland from France aged 17, she played for JKS SMS Jastrzębie, whilst simultaneously attending and representing SMS PZPS Szczyrk sports academy.

==== Professional ====
She began her professional career at BKS Bielsko-Biała before spending two seasons (2020-2021 and 2021–2022) at Legionovia Legionowo.

For the 2022-2023 she signed for Serie A1 team Chieri 76.

=== International ===
She made her debut for Poland's B team in 2015, who represented the country in 2015 Women's European Volleyball League.

She participated in the 2018 FIVB Volleyball Women's Nations League.

== Honours ==
Volley Masters Montreux:

- Gold medal: 2019
