= Immacolata Sirressi =

Italian volleyball player (born 1990)

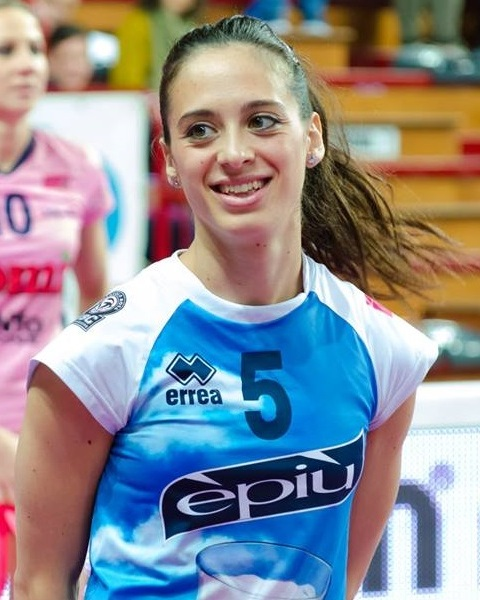
- Sirressi with Casalmaggiore in 2015

Personal information
- Nationality: Italian
- Born: 19 May 1990 (age 36); Santeramo in Colle, Italy
- Height: 175 cm (5 ft 9 in)
- Weight: 62 kg (137 lb)
- Spike: 284 cm (112 in)
- Block: 260 cm (102 in)

Volleyball information
- Position: Libero

Career
Years	Teams
2009	Duck Farm Chieri Torino

National team
2009	Italy

Immacolata "Imma" Sirressi (born 19 May 1990 in Santeramo in Colle) is an Italian female volleyball player.

== Career ==
She was part of the Italy women's national volleyball team. On club level she played for Duck Farm Chieri Torino in 2009. She was selected to play the Italian League All-Star game in 2017.
