= Camilla Weitzel =

German volleyball player

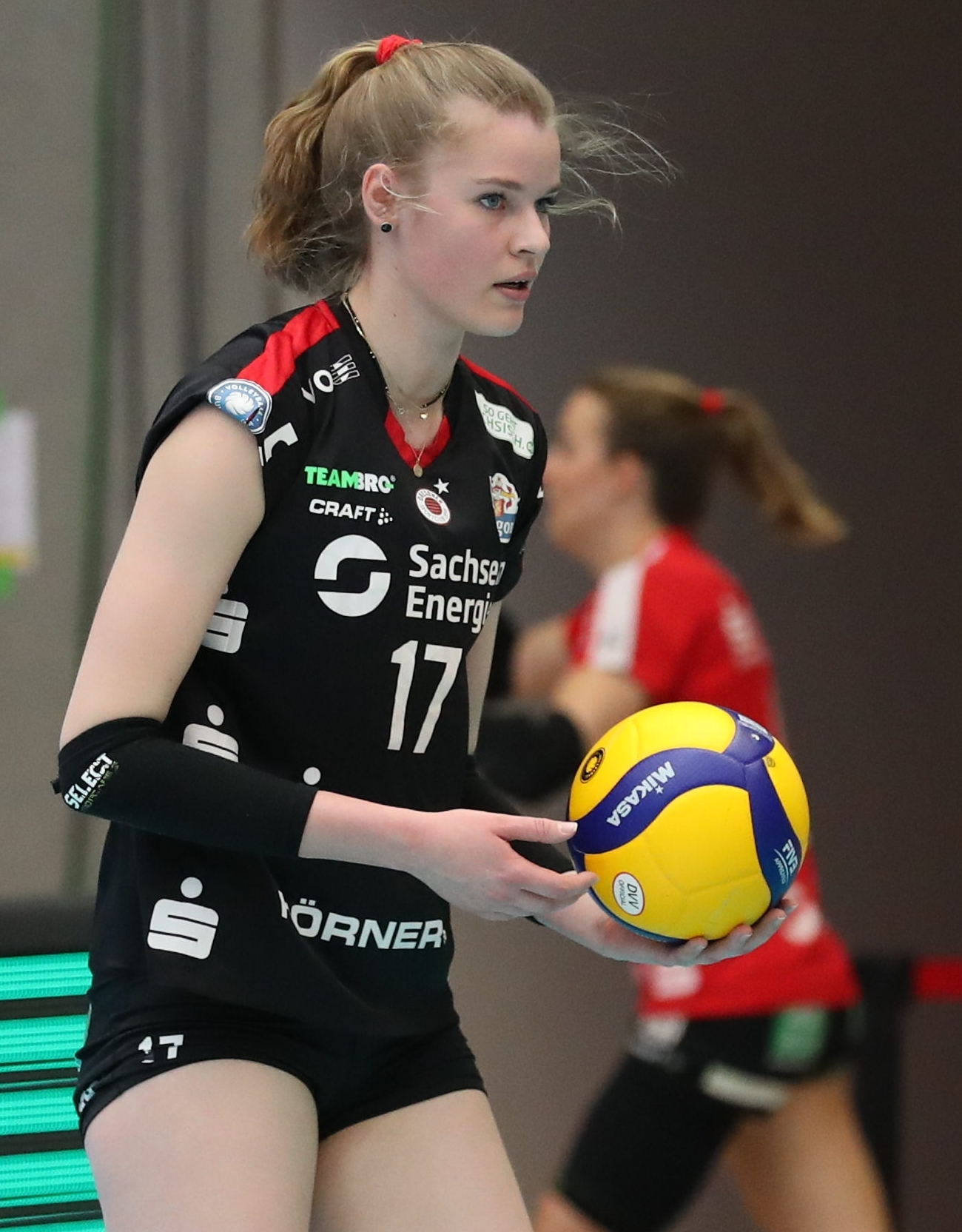

Personal information
- Nationality: German
- Born: 11 June 2000 (age 26); Hamburg, Germany
- Height: 1.95 m (6 ft 5 in)
- Weight: 75 kg (165 lb)
- Spike: 305 cm (120 in)
- Block: 297 cm (117 in)

Volleyball information
- Position: Middle Blocker
- Current club: (Turkey) Eczacıbaşı
- Number: 21

Career
Years	Teams
2014-2018	VC Olympia Dresden
2018-2021	Dresdner SC 1898
2021-2024	Chieri '76 Volleyball
2024-2025	Megavolley
2025-2026	Savino del bene Scandicci
2026-	Eczacıbaşı

Camilla Weitzel (born 11 June 2000 Hamburg) is a German volleyball player. She plays as a middle blocker for the Germany women's national volleyball team.

== Career ==
In 2013 she moved to Dresden to train in the youth program of Olympia Dresden. She made her league debut on 28 October 2017, and also won the German Cup during that season. In 2021, she moved to the Italian league, with Reale Mutua Fenera Chieri, where she won the 2022 Western European Volleyball Zonal Association Cup, and 2022-2023 Challenge Cup.

She competed at the 2016 European U19 Championship, 2019 Women's European Volleyball Championship, 2019 FIVB Volleyball Women's Nations League, 2021 Women's European Volleyball Championship, 2021 FIVB Volleyball Women's Nations League, 2022 FIVB Volleyball Women's Nations League, 2022 FIVB Volleyball Women's World Championship.

== Awards ==
=== Clubs ===
- 2025 FIVB Club World Championship – Gold medal, with Savino del Bene Scandicci
