= Kaja Grobelna =

Belgian volleyball player

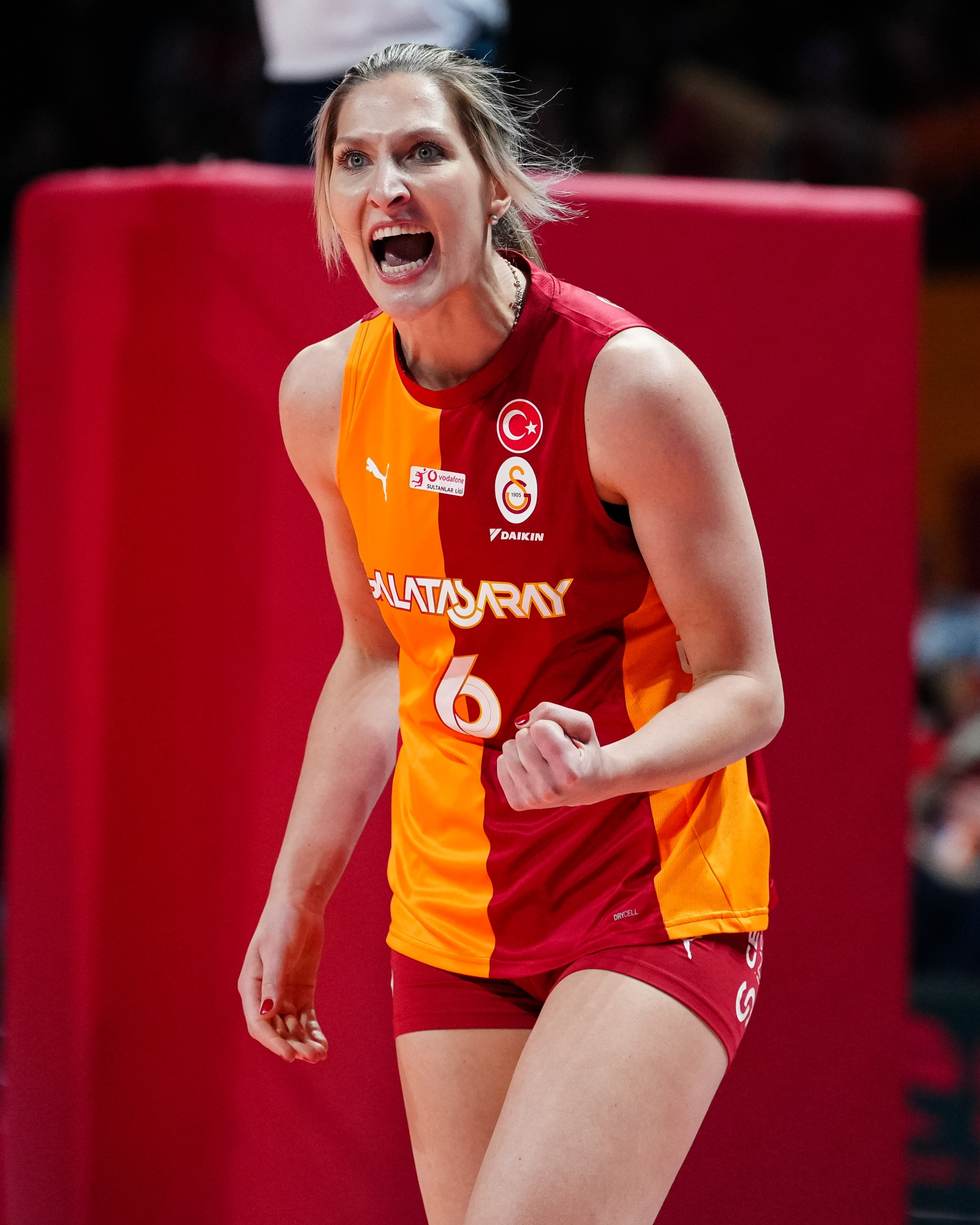
- Kaja Grobelna, 2026

Personal information
- Nationality: Belgian
- Born: 4 January 1995 (age 31); Radom
- Height: 188 cm (74 in)
- Weight: 72 kg (159 lb)
- Spike: 320 cm (126 in)
- Block: 295 cm (116 in)

Volleyball information
- Position: Opposite
- Current club: Igor Gorgonzola Novara

Career
Years	Teams
2012–2015; 2015–2016; 2016–2018; 2018–2019; 2019–2024; 2024–2025; 2025–2026; 2026–	(Belgium) Asterix Kieldrecht (Germany) Allianz MTV Stuttgart (Poland) Budowlani Łódź (Italy) Unet E-Work Busto Arsizio (Italy) Chieri '76 Volleyball (Japan) Queenseis Kariya (Turkey) Galatasaray (Italy) Igor Gorgonzola Novara

National team
2013–	Belgium

Kaja Grobelna (born 4 January 1995 in Radom) is a Belgian volleyball player of Polish origin, playing as an opposite spiker.

== Club career ==
Since the 2018/2019 season, she has played for Unet E-Work Busto Arsizio. Then played for the Chieri '76 Volleyball.

=== Queenseis Kariya ===
Now, she is currently playing for the Queenseis Kariya for the 2024/2025 season.

=== Galatasaray ===
On June 26, 2025, she signed with Galatasaray of the Turkish Sultanlar Ligi.

== International career ==
She played for the Belgium women's national volleyball team, at the 2017 FIVB Volleyball World Grand Prix.

== Sporting achievements ==
=== Clubs ===
Belgian Super Cup:

- 2012, 2014

Belgium Championship:

- 2014, 2015
- 2013

Belgian Cup:

- 2014, 2015

German Championship:

- 2016

Polish Championship:

- 2017
- 2018

Polish Super Cup:

- 2017

Polish Cup:

- 2018

CEV Cup:

- 2019, 2024, 2025–26

Challenge Cup:

- 2023

WEVZA Cup:

- 2022

Individual awards

- 2024: MVP CEV Cup, Best scorer CEV Cup
- 2018: Best opposite Polish Cup
- 2017: MVP of the League (TAURON Liga), Best server Polish Cup
- 2015: MVP Belgian Cup, Best spiker Belgian Cup

=== National team ===
European League:

- 2013
