= Marina Lubian =

Italian volleyball player

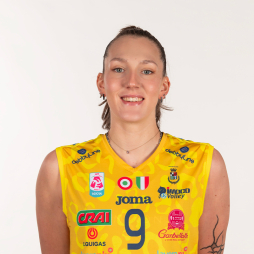
- Lubian with Imoco Volley in 2025

Personal information
- Born: 11 April 2000 (age 26)
- Height: 196 cm (6 ft 4 in Ft)

Volleyball information
- Position: Middle Blocker
- Current club: Chieri '76
- Number: 9

Career
Years	Teams
2015–2016	Lilliput Settimo Torinese
2016–2019	Club Italia
2019-2022	Savino Del Bene Scandicci
2022-2026	Imoco Volley Congeliano
2026–	Chieri '76
Honours
Representing Italy
Olympic Games
Gold medal – first place	2024 Paris	Team
FIVB Nations League
Gold medal – first place	2022 Ankara	Team
Gold medal – first place	2024 Bangkok	Team

Marina Lubian (born 11 April 2000) is an Italian volleyball player. She represented Italy at the 2024 Summer Olympics.

== Awards ==
=== Clubs ===
- 2024–25 CEV Champions League – Champion, with Imoco Volley
