= Nanami Seki =

Japanese volleyball player (born 1999)

Personal information
- Full name: Nanami Seki
- Nationality: Japanese
- Born: 12 June 1999 (age 27)
- Height: 1.71 m (5 ft 7 in)
- Weight: 60 kg (132 lb)
- Spike: 280 cm (110 in)

Volleyball information
- Position: Setter
- Current club: (Italy) UYBA Busto Arsizio
- Number: 6 (national), 5 (club)

Career
- Years: Team
- 2015–2018: (Japan) Kashiwai High School
- 2018–2024: (Japan) Toray Arrows
- 2024–2025: (Italy) Imoco Conegliano
- 2025–: (Italy) UYBA Busto Arsizio

National team
- Years: Team
- 2019–present: Japan
Honours
Women's volleyball
Representing Japan
AVC Continental Championship
Gold medal – first place	2019 Seoul	Team
Bronze medal – third place	2026 Tianjin	Team
FIVB Nations League
Silver medal – second place	2024 Bangkok	Team

Nanami Seki (関 菜々巳, Seki Nanami, born 12 June 1999) is a Japanese professional volleyball player in the setter position. She has been a part of the Japan women's national volleyball team since 2019.

== Career ==
Nanami was born in Funabashi, Chiba Prefecture and she has an older sister. She was inspired by her older sister to start playing volleyball in her second grade of elementary school.

Nanami decided to enroll at Kashiwai High School after watching the All Japan Volleyball High School Championship when she was in Junior High.

In 2016 she was selected to represent Japan at the 2016 Asian Women's U19 Volleyball Championship and placed second at the tournament.

From 2018 to 2024 she competed in V.League (Japan) as a player of Toray Arrows.

With her national team, she participated in the 2022 FIVB Volleyball Women's World Championship, 2022 FIVB Volleyball Women's Nations League, and 2023 FIVB Volleyball Women's Nations League.

== Awards and individual honors ==
=== Club ===
- 2024 Club World Championship – Champion, with Imoco Volley Conegliano
- 2024–25 CEV Champions League – Champion, with Imoco Volley Conegliano
