= Hawi Okumu Oba =

Japanese volleyball player (born 1998)

Personal information
- Full name: Fuyumi Hawi Okumu Oba
- Nationality: Japan
- Born: 27 June 1998 (age 28)
- Hometown: Fukuoka City
- Height: 177 cm (5 ft 10 in)
- Weight: 78 kg (172 lb)

Volleyball information
- Position: Opposite Hitter
- Current club: Saitama Ageo Medics

Career
Years	Teams
2017–2025	Astemo Rivale Ibaraki
2025–	Saitama Ageo Medics

National team
2022–	Japan

Fuyumi Hawi Okumu Oba (Japanese: オクム大庭 冬美ハウィ, romanized: Okumu Ōba Fuyumi Hawi; born 27 June 1998) is a Japanese volleyball player.

== Early life ==
Fuyumi Hawi Okumu Oba was born on June 27, 1998 to Kenyan volleyball coach Godfrey Okumu and Japanese volleyball player Kozue Oba. Hawi Okumu Oba attended Hakata Girls' High School. She has roots in Nairobi and Fukuoka City. (Note: Astemo Rivale Ibaraki reports Okumu Oba was born in Fukuoka City while the FIVB Player Database list her birthplace as Nairobi.)

== Club career ==
Okumu Oba joined the Astemo Rivale Ibaraki of the V.Premier League in 2017. She left Astemo by the end of the 2024–25 SV.League season.

She joined Saitama Ageo Medics in mid-2025.

== National team ==
Hawi Okumu Oba was supposed to debut for the Japan national team at the Philippines leg of the 2022 FIVB Women's Volleyball Nations League in June but was sidelined due to COVID-19. Okumu Oba eventually debuted for Japan at the 2022 Asian Women's Volleyball Cup She was called up to participate in a training camp in 2024.
