= Fleur Savelkoel =

Dutch volleyball player (born 1995)

Personal information
- Nationality: Dutch
- Born: 22 August 1995 (age 31); Deventer
- Height: 184 cm (72 in)
- Weight: 76 kg (168 lb)
- Spike: 312 cm (123 in)
- Block: 302 cm (119 in)
- Education: Rijksuniversiteit Groningen, University of Utrecht

Volleyball information
- Position: Position 4
- Current club: Sliedrecht Sport
- Number: 6

Career
Years	Teams
2015	New Nexus Apps/Lycurgus
2016	G.S.V.V. Donitas
2017, 2018, 2019, 2020	Sliedrecht Sport

National team
2015	Netherlands

Fleur Savelkoel (born 22 August 1995) is a Dutch volleyball player, active in the highest Dutch volleyball League since 2012.

On club level she played for New Nexus Apps/Lycurgus in 2015, GSVV Donitas in 2016, and is currently playing at three times national championship winner Sliedrecht Sport. With Sliedrecht Sport, she also reached the national cupfinals 4 times in a row, of which they won the last 3 editions. Besides that, Sliedrecht managed to win the ‘Supercup’ in 2017, 2018 and 2019.

With her current club, Savelkoel participated in European competitions in 2017 (Championsleague & CEV Cup), 2018 (Championsleague & CEV Cup) and 2019 (CEV Cup).
