= Katarzyna Wenerska =

Polish volleyball player (born 1993)

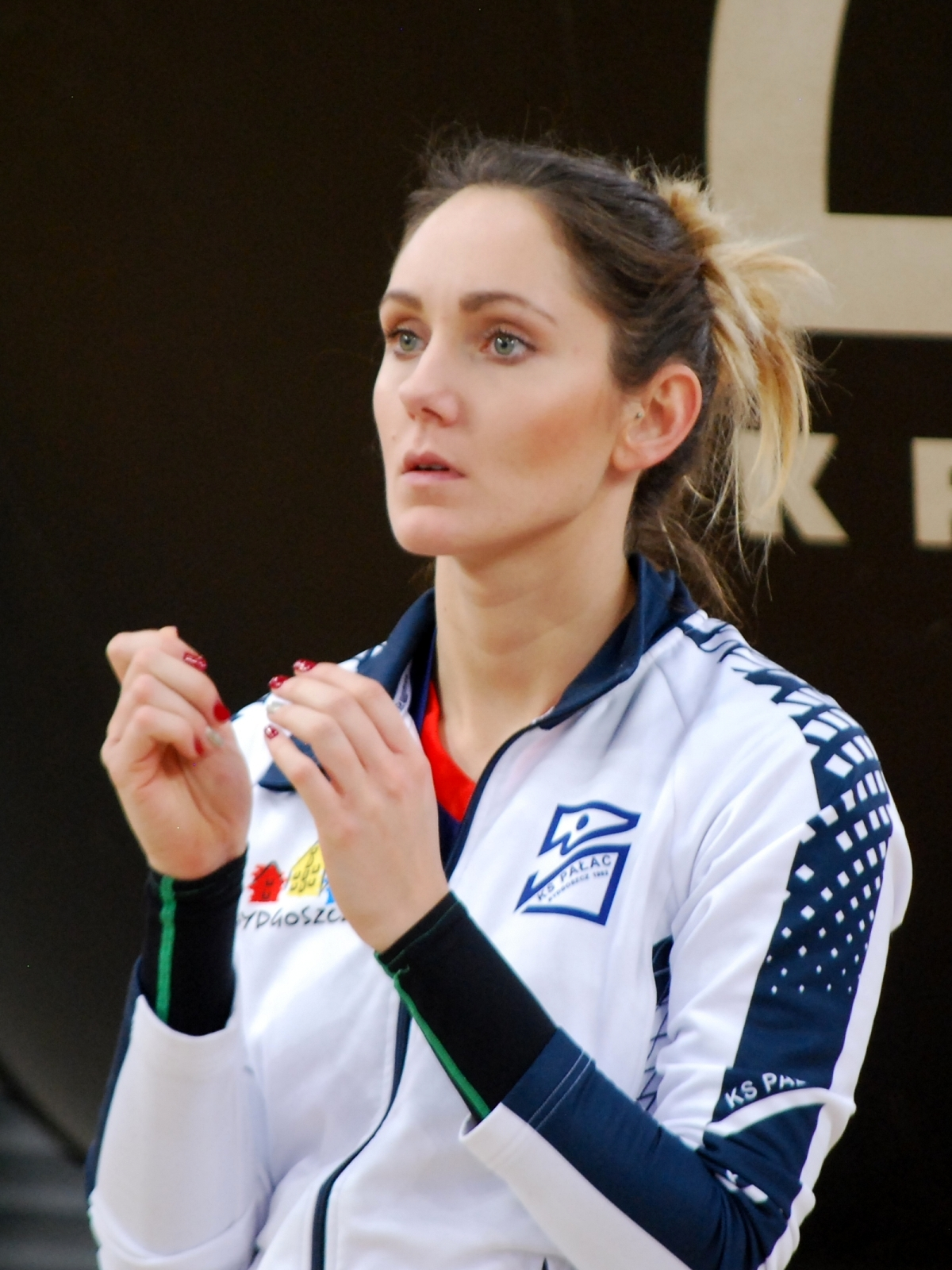
- Katarzyna Wenerska (2017)

Personal information
- Born: 9 March 1993 (age 33) Świecie
- Height: 180 cm (5 ft 11 in)

Sport
- Position: Setter
- Club: Developres Bella Dolina Rzeszów
Medal record
Women's Volleyball
Representing Poland
FIVB Nations League
Bronze medal – third place	2023 Arlington	Team
Bronze medal – third place	2024 Bangkok	Team
Bronze medal – third place	2025 Łódź	Team

Katarzyna Wenerska (born 9 March 1993 in Świecie) is a Polish volleyball player, representing her country as a setter.

== Career ==
She is a product of Joker Świecie. With this club, she won a bronze medal at the 2005 Polish Mini Volleyball Championships (three-player teams) and a gold medal at the 2006 Polish Mini Volleyball Championships (four-player teams). Since 2008, she has been playing in the newly formed senior team of Joker, achieving promotion to the II league in 2009 and to the I league (second-tier competition) in 2014. In the 2017/2018 season, she played for Pałac Bydgoszcz, competing in the top-tier competition. In 2018, she returned to Joker and won the I league with them in the 2018/2019 season. The team from Świecie, however, opted out of the play-off for promotion to the top tier.

In the 2019/2020 season, she won the I league again with Joker, and in the 2020/2021 season, she played with the Świecie team in the Tauron Liga (the team finished in 11th place). During the league season, she was named MVP of a match once (in January 2021 against Energa MKS Kalisz).

Since July 2021, she has been a player for KS DevelopRes Rzeszów. With this club, she won the Polish SuperCup in 2021.

In April 2021, she was called up to the extended Polish senior national team. In early June 2021, she was called up for the Nations League matches, replacing the injured Marta Krajewska. She made her national team debut in the Nations League on 12 June 2021, in a match against Brazil (the team finished in 11th place). She also participated in the European Championship that year (Poland finished in 5th place).
