= Kirsten Knip =

Dutch volleyball player (born 1992)

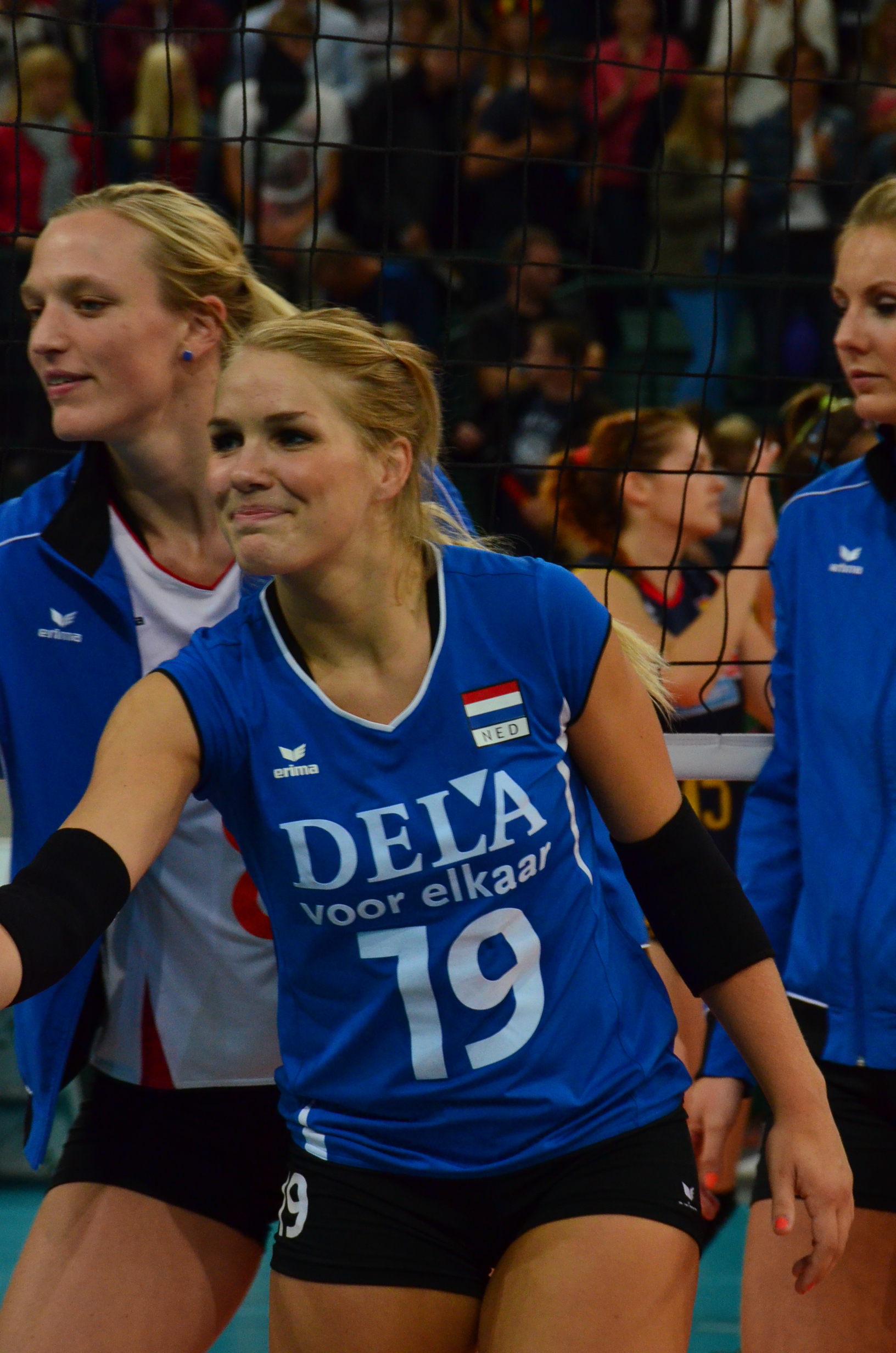

Personal information
- Nationality: Dutch
- Born: 14 January 1992 (age 34); Enkhuizen, Netherlands
- Height: 1.76 m (5 ft 9 in)
- Weight: 73 kg (161 lb)
- Spike: 281 cm (111 in)
- Block: 275 cm (108 in)

Volleyball information
- Position: Libero
- Current club: Ladies in Black Aachen
- Number: 1

National team
Netherlands
Honours
European Championship
Silver medal – second place	2017 Azerbaijan/Georgia
Bronze medal – third place	2023 Belgium/Estonia/Germany/Italy

Kirsten Knip (born 14 September 1992) is a Dutch volleyball player for Ladies in Black Aachen and the Dutch national team.

She participated at the 2017 Women's European Volleyball Championship. and 2019 FIVB Volleyball Women's Nations League.
