= Anastasia Guerra =

Italian volleyball player (born 1996)

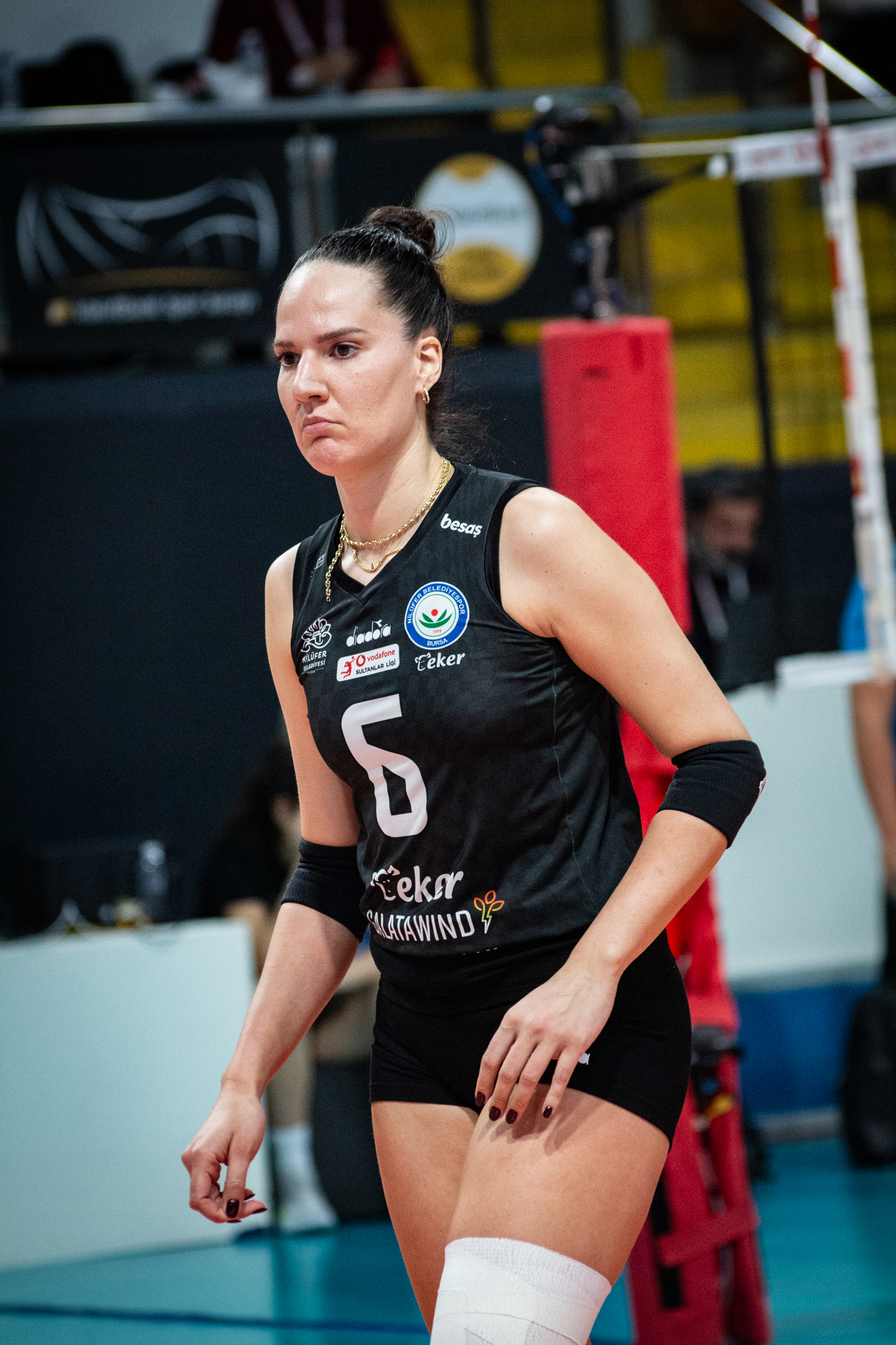
- Guerra in 2025

Personal information
- Nationality: Italian
- Born: 15 October 1996 (age 30)
- Height: 1.86 m (73 in)
- Weight: 74 kg (163 lb)
- Spike: 314 cm (124 in)
- Block: 301 cm (119 in)

Volleyball information
- Position: Outside hitter

Career
Years	Teams
2014–2016; 2016–2018; 2018; 2019; 2019–2020; 2020–2021; 2021–2023; 2023–2024; 2024; 2024; 2024–2025; 2025; 2025–2026	Club Italia; Pomi Casalmaggiore; Guhoa Life Shanghai; ASPTT Mulhuose; Chieri Volley; Azzurra Volley Firenze; Bartoccini Perugia; Muratpaşa Belediyespor; Volley Milano; Sarıyer Belediyespor; Nilüfer Belediyespor; Bahçelievler Belediyespor; Bandung BJB Tandamata

National team
2015–	Italy
Honours
U18 European Championship
Silver medal – second place	2013 Kladovo/Bar

Anastasia Guerra (born 15 October 1996) is an Italian volleyball player, playing as an opposite. She is part of the Italy women's national volleyball team.

She competed at the 2015 European Games in Baku. At club level she played for Club Italia in 2015.

== Sporting achievements ==
=== Awards ===
- 2013 Girls' Youth European Volleyball Championship - Most Valuable Player

=== Clubs ===
==== FIVB Club World Championship ====
- 2016 - with Pomi Casalmaggiore
