= Aleksandra Szczygłowska =

Polish volleyball player

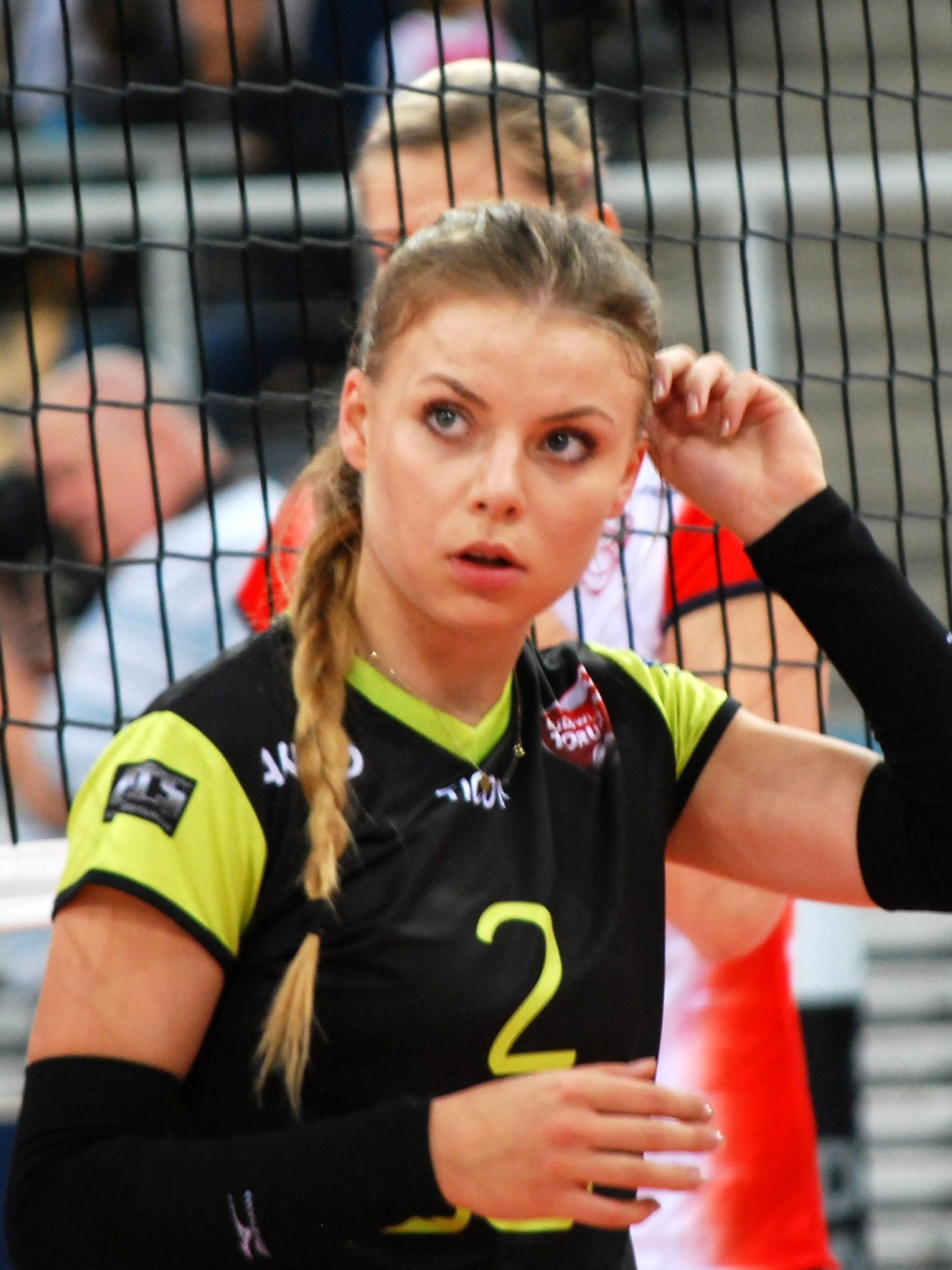

Personal information
- Nationality: Polish
- Born: 22 March 1998 (age 28); Elbląg
- Height: 5 ft 8 in (1.72 m)
- Weight: 128 lb (58 kg)
- Spike: 113 in (288 cm)
- Block: 109 in (278 cm)

Volleyball information
- Position: Libero
- Current club: (Poland) KS Developres Rzeszów
- Number: 12

Career
Years	Teams
-2017; 2017-2018; 2018-2020; 2020-2021; 2021-	(Poland) KS Orzeł Elbląg (Poland) Poli Budowlani Toruń (Poland) UNI Opole (Poland) BKS Bostik Bielsko-Biała (Poland) KS Developres Rzeszów
Honours
Women's volleyball
Representing Poland
FIVB Nations League
Bronze medal – third place	2024 Bangkok	Team
Bronze medal – third place	2025 Łódź	Team

Aleksandra Szczygłowska (born 22 March 1998) is a Polish volleyball player, playing in position libero.

== Sporting achievements ==
=== Clubs ===
Polish Supercup:

- 2021

Polish Cup:

- 2022

Polish Championship:

- 2022
