= Caterina Bosetti =

Italian professional volleyball player

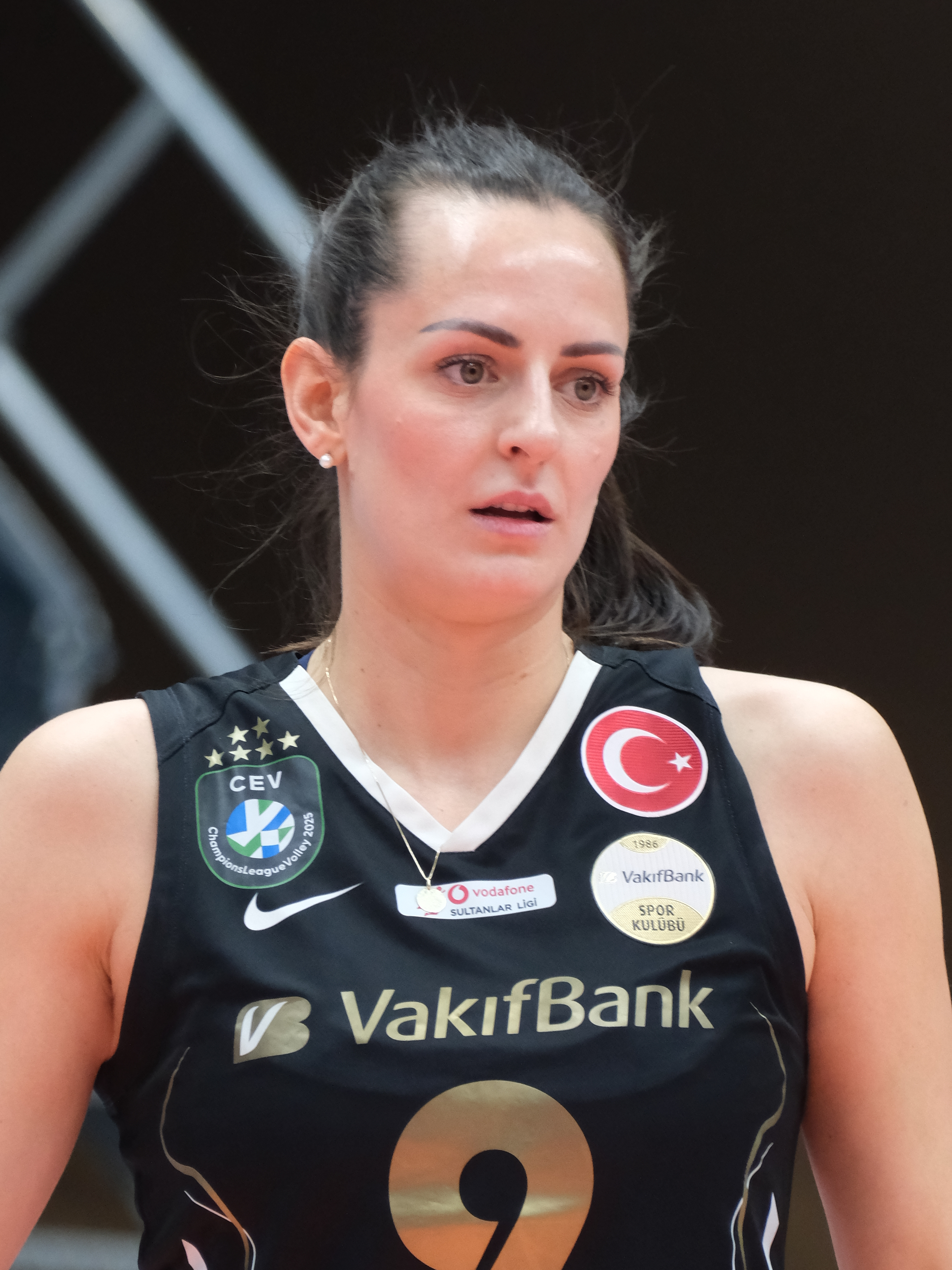
- Bosetti playing for VakıfBank Istanbul in 2025

Personal information
- Full name: Caterina Chiara Bosetti
- Born: 2 February 1994 (age 32); Tradate, Italy
- Height: 1.80 m (5 ft 11 in)
- Weight: 66 kg (146 lb)
- Spike: 315 cm (124 in)
- Block: 231 cm (91 in)

Volleyball information
- Position: Outside hitter
- Current club: Scandicci
- Number: 9

Career
Years	Teams
2007–2009	Amatori Atletica Orago
2009–2013	Villa Cortese
2013–2014	Molico Osasco
2014–2015	Galatasaray
2015–2016	Igor Gorgonzola Novara
2016–2018	River Volley Piacenza
2018–2020	E'PiùPomì Casalmaggiore
2020–2024	Igor Gorgonzola Novara
2024–2025	VakıfBank Istanbul
2025–2026	Scandicci

National team
2011–	Italy
Honours
Women's volleyball
Representing Italy
Olympic Games
Gold medal – first place	2024 Paris	Team
FIVB World Championship
Bronze medal – third place	2022 Poland/Netherlands	Team
World Cup
Gold medal – first place	2011 Japan
FIVB Nations League
Gold medal – first place	2022 Ankara	Team
Gold medal – first place	2024 Bangkok	Team
World Grand Prix
Silver medal – second place	2017 Nanjing
U20 World Championship
Gold medal – first place	2011 Perú

Caterina Chiara Bosetti (born 2 February 1994) is an Italian professional volleyball player who plays for Savino del Bene Scandicci and the Italian national team. She is an Olympic gold medallist.

== Personal life ==
The daughter of Giuseppe Bosetti, former coach of Italy's volleyball female national team, and Franca Bardelli, who played 93 times for the latter, she was born at Tradate. Her sister Lucia Bosetti is also a volleyball player.

== Career ==
In 2012, she competed at the Summer Olympics.

Bosetti won the silver medal in the 2014 FIVB Club World Championship after her club lost 0-3 to the Russian Dinamo Kazan in the championship match. She played with her national team at the 2014 World Championship. There her team ended up in fourth place after losing 2-3 to Brazil the bronze medal match. She was selected to play the Italian League All-Star game in 2017.

== Awards ==
=== Individuals ===
- 2011 FIVB U20 World Championship "MVP"
- 2011 FIVB U20 World Championship "Best spiker"
- 2017–18 Italian League "All-Star"
- 2022 FIVB Nations League "Best outside spiker"

=== Clubs ===
- 2010 Italian Cup – Champions, with Villa Cortese
- 2011 Italian Cup – Champions, with Villa Cortese
- 2012 Italian Supercup – Runner-up, with Villa Cortese
- 2013 Italian Cup – Runner-up, with Villa Cortese
- 2013 Paulista Championship – Champions, with Molico Osasco
- 2014 Brazilian Cup – Champions, with Molico Osasco
- 2014 South American Club Championship – Runner-up, with Molico Osasco
- 2014 FIVB Club World Championship – Runner-up, with Molico Osasco
- 2024 Wevza Cup Champions, with Igor Gorgonzola Novara
- 2024 Cev Challenge Cup, with Igor Gorgonzola Novara
- 2025 Turkish Championship - Champions, with VakıfBank Istanbul
- 2025 FIVB Club World Championship – Gold medal, with Savino del Bene Scandicci

Awards
Preceded by (United States) Michelle Bartsch-Hackley and (Brazil) Gabriela Guimarães	Best Outside Hitter of FIVB Nations League; 2022 (with (Brazil) Gabriela Guimarães)	Succeeded by Incumbent
