= Danielle Cuttino =

American volleyball player (born 1996)

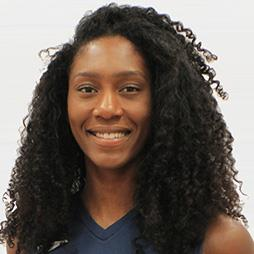
- Cuttino in 2019

Personal information
- Full name: Danielle Amina Cuttino
- Nationality: United States
- Born: June 22, 1996 (age 30)
- Home town: Indianapolis, Indiana, U.S.
- Education: Purdue
- Height: 194 cm (6 ft 4 in)
- Weight: 79 kg (174 lb)
- Spike: 325 cm (128 in)
- Block: 306 cm (120 in)

Volleyball information
- Position: Middle Blocker/Opposite
- Current club: (United States) LOVB Atlanta

Career
- Years: Team
- 2014–2017: (United States) Purdue
- 2018–2020: (Italy) Casalmaggiore
- 2020–2022: (Brazil) Minas
- 2022–2023: (Japan) Toyota Auto Body Queenseis
- 2023–2024: (Turkey) Galatasaray
- 2024–: (United States) LOVB Atlanta

National team
- Years: Team
- 2019–: United States
Medal record
Volleyball
Representing the United States
Pan-American Cup
Gold medal – first place	2019 Trujillo/Chiclayo
Bronze medal – third place	2021 Santo Domingo

Danielle Cuttino (born June 22, 1996) is an American volleyball player who plays as an opposite hitter for the United States women's national volleyball team and American professional team LOVB Atlanta.

== Early life ==
Cuttino is from Indianapolis, Indiana and attended high school at Ben Davis High School. She was a U.S. Junior National team member and was considered the tenth ranked recruit in her graduating class. She also played basketball in high school where she as an all-state honoree.

== Career ==
=== College ===
Cuttino played as an outside hitter before moving to middle blocker at Purdue. She was named on the Big Ten All-Freshman team in 2014 and was an AVCA First Team All-American as a senior in 2017.

=== Professional clubs ===
==== Galatasaray ====
She signed a 1-year contract with Galatasaray on June 20, 2023.

=== USA National Team ===
Cuttino joined the national team in 2019 and won a gold medal at the 2019 Women's Pan-American Volleyball Cup. She was the captain and won a bronze medal at the 2021 Women's Pan-American Volleyball Cup, with a team leading 15 points in the bronze medal match.

She was named to the roster for the 2022 National League tournament. She had 10 kills, two blocks and seven digs in a win against Bulgaria. In a win vs. China, she tallied eight points on seven kills and one block.

== Awards and honors ==
=== Clubs ===
- 2021–2022 South American Club Championships – Gold medal, with Minas
- 2021–2022 Superliga – Gold medal, with Minas
- 2021–2022 Mineiro Championship – Silver medal, with Minas
- 2021–2022 Brazilian Super Cup – Silver medal, with Minas
- 2021–2022 Brazilian Cup – Silver medal, with Minas
- 2020–2021 South American Club Championships – Silver medal, with Minas
- 2020–2021 Brazilian Cup – Gold medal, with Minas
- 2020–2021 Mineiro Championbship – Gold medal, with Minas
- 2020–2021 Troféu Super Vôlei – Bronze medal, with Minas
- 2020–2021 Superliga – Gold medal, with Minas

=== College ===
- AVCA First Team All-American (2017)
