= Ali Frantti =

American volleyball player (born 1996)

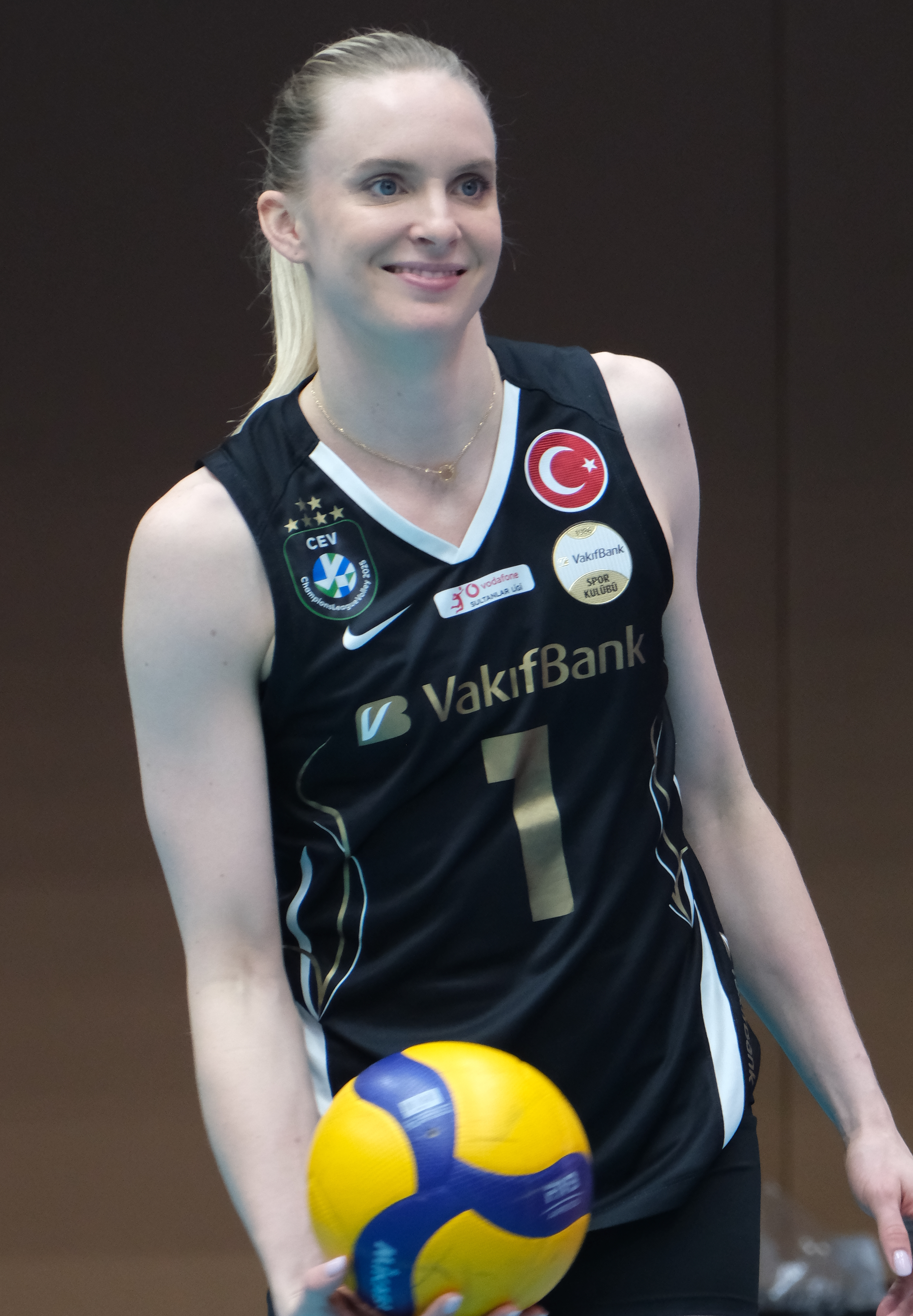
- Frantti playing for Vakıfbank Istanbul in 2025

Personal information
- Full name: Alexandra Annelise Frantti
- Nickname: Ali
- Nationality: United States
- Born: March 3, 1996 (age 30); Highland Park, Illinois, U.S.
- Hometown: Spring Grove, Illinois, U.S.
- Height: 6 ft 3 in (1.91 m)
- Weight: 163 lb (74 kg)
- Spike: 125 in (317 cm)
- Education: Penn State University

Volleyball information
- Position: Outside Hitter
- Current club: (Turkey) İlbank

Career
Years	Teams
2014–2017	(United States) Penn State
2017–2018	(Slovenia) Calcit Volley
2018–2019	(France) ASPTT Mulhouse
2019–2020	(Poland) KS DevelopRes Rzeszów
2020–2022	(Italy) Chieri
2022–2023	(Italy) Casalmaggiore
2023–2025	(Turkey) Vakıfbank Istanbul
2025–2026	(Turkey) Galatasaray
2026–	(Turkey) İlbank

National team
2022–present	United States

Alexandra Annelise Frantti (born March 3, 1996) is an American professional volleyball player who plays as an outside hitter for the Turkish Women's Volleyball League club İlbank.

== Early life ==
Alexandra Annelise Frantti was born in Highland Park, Illinois to parents Kelly and Dan Frantti. She grew up in Spring Grove, Illinois. She attended high school at Richmond Burton, where she played volleyball. She played club volleyball for Club Fusion and won back-to-back AAU titles, collecting MVP honors in 2012. She was the Illinois Gatorade Player of the Year in 2013 and committed to play volleyball at Penn State. She was the #2 nationally ranked recruit coming out of high school.

== Career ==
=== College ===
After leading the team in kills her freshman season, Frantti was named the AVCA National Freshman of the Year and a second team All-American after helping Penn State win its 7th NCAA title in 2014. At the beginning of her senior year in 2017, she surpassed the 1,000 career mark at Penn State.

=== Professional clubs ===
After spending two seasons with Chieri, Frantti signed with Casalmaggiore for the 2022–2023 season.

On July 4, 2025, she signed with Galatasaray of the Turkish Sultanlar Ligi.

=== U.S. National Team ===
In May 2022, Frantti made her national team debut when she was named to the 25-player roster for the 2022 FIVB Volleyball Nations League tournament. In her first match with the national team she had 15 kills, which led the team during the opening match win vs. Dominican Republic. She led all players in a win vs. Poland, with 15 kills and 3 blocks. A few days later, she had a dominating performance in a win vs. Thailand, finishing with 27 points on 24 kills, two blocks and one ace, and recorded 10 digs.

Frantti made her second major international competition just 3 months after her national team debut when she was named to the roster for the 2022 FIVB World Championship. In the preliminary pool round, she started several matches as an outside hitter, becoming the highest scorer on the floor for all three matches. In the opening match victory versus Kazakhstan, she posted a team high 14 points via 13 kills and 1 service ace. In the following match versus Canada, she followed up with another high scoring performance, leading all scorers with 15 points via 14 kills and a block. The next match saw opponent Bulgaria, which was another victory for the United States. Frantti again led in points for the third straight match, with 19 points via 17 kills, a block, and a service ace.

== Awards and honors ==
=== Clubs ===
==== Team ====
- 2017–2018 Slovenian League – Silver medal, with Calcit Volley
- 2017–2018 Slovenian Cup – Silver medal, with Calcit Volley
- 2018–2019 French Ligue A – Bronze medal, with ASPTT Mulhouse.
- 2018–2019 French Cup – Bronze medal, with ASPTT Mulhouse.
- 2019–2020 TAURON Liga Silver medal, with KS DevelopRes Rzeszów.
- 2019–2020 Trofeo McDonald's Imola Bronze medal, with KS DevelopRes Rzeszów.
- 2020–2021 Italian Cup Bronze medal, with Chieri
- 2021–2022 Italian Cup Bronze medal, with Chieri
- 2025–2026 CEV Cup Champion, with Galatasaray

==== Individual ====
- Polish Cup - Best Outside Hitter (2019–2020)
- French Ligue A - Best Outside Hitter (2018–2019)

=== College ===
- 2014 NCAA Division I Championship – Champions, with Penn State
- AVCA National Freshman of the Year (2014)
- AVCA Second Team All-American (2014)
- AVCA All-Northeast Region (2015, 2016, 2017)

== See also ==
- List of Pennsylvania State University Olympians
