= Milica Kubura =

Serbian volleyball player

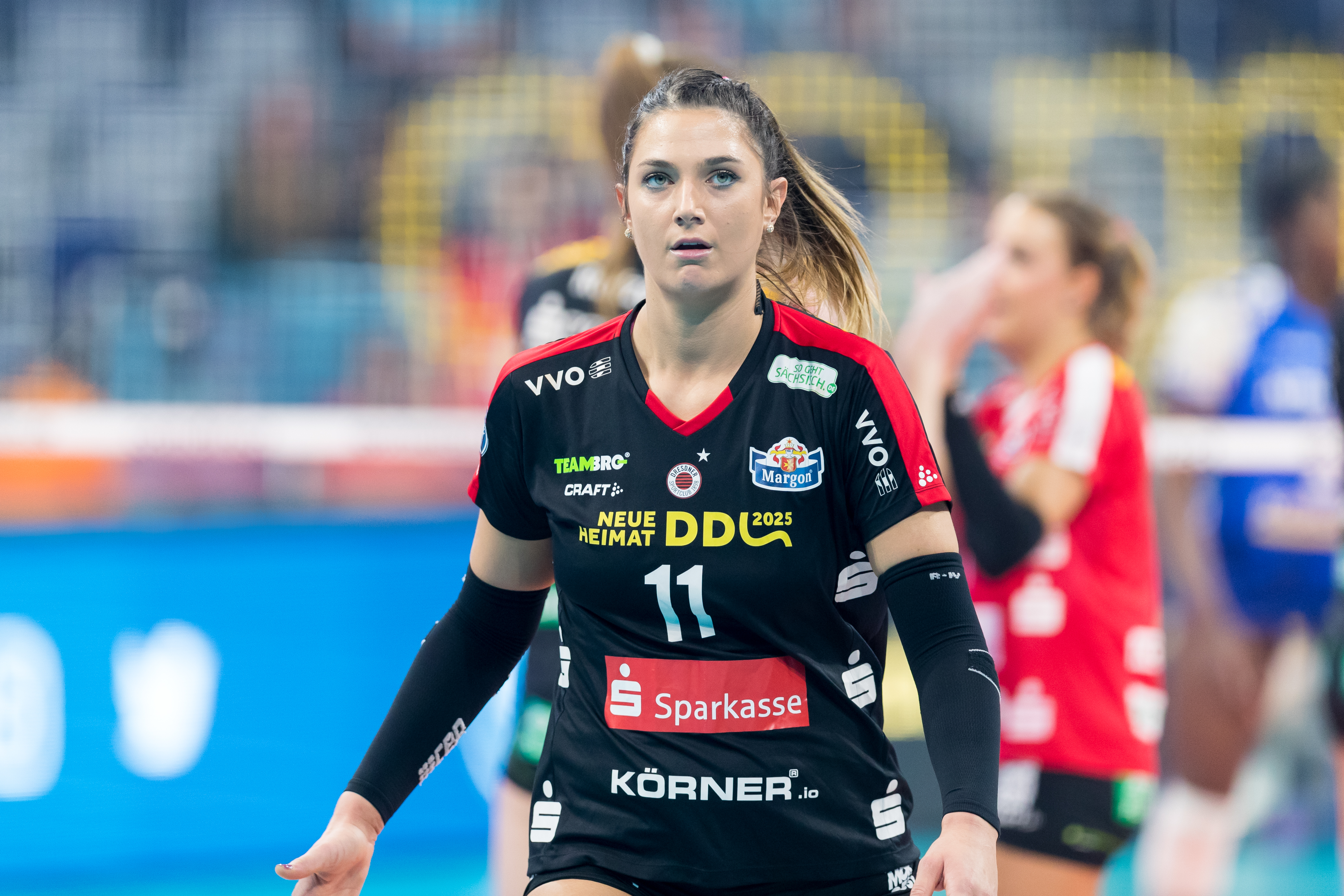
- Milica Kubura with Dresdner SC shirt

Personal information
- Nationality: Serbia – Greece
- Born: 20 March 1995 (age 31) Beograd, Serbia
- Height: 1.93 m (6 ft 4 in)
- Weight: 77 kg (170 lb)
- Spike: 307 cm (121 in)
- Block: 290 cm (114 in)

Volleyball information
- Position: Opposite
- Current club: Olympiacos SF Piraeus
- Number: 12 (Club)

Career
- Years: Team
- 2011–2013 2014–2018 2018–2019 2019–2020 2020–2021 2021–2022 2022–: (Serbia) Crvena Zvezda Belgrade (United States) Seminoles (Florida State University) (Serbia) Partizan Belgrade (Germany) Dresdner SC (Greece) PAOK Thessaloniki; Withdrawn (Greece) Olympiacos Piraeus

National team
- Years: Team
- Serbia
Medal record
Women's volleyball
Representing Serbia
Girls' U-18 World Championship
Bronze medal – third place	2011 Ankara, Turkey	Team
Women's U-20 European Championship
Silver medal – second place	2012 Ankara, Turkey	Team
- Updated on 5 May 2025

Milica Kubura (Serbian Cyrillic: Милица Кубура; born 20 March 1995) is a Serbian-Greek international volleyball player with the Serbian national team, who plays as an opposite spiker. On club level she plays for Olympiacos Piraeus.

== Career ==
Milica Kubura began her volleyball career, encouraged by her older sister, at Crvena Zvezda Belgrade, winning the Championship and the Serbian Cup twice (2011–12 and 2012–13). In 2014, she moved to the United States to study, where she played for Florida State University from 2014 to 2018. After completing her studies in the United States in 2018, she returned to Serbia, playing for Partizan Belgrade. In the 2019–20 season, Kubura moved to Germany, playing for Dresdner SC winning the German Cup.
In the summer of 2020, she was initially set to sign for VolAlto Caserta, but the Italian club did not receive approval to play in Serie A1, so Militsa Kubura went to Greece and played for PAOK Thessaloniki,

The following season, she remained out of competition, as she married a Greek man, became a mother and settled in Athens. In July 2022, she signed for Olympiacos Piraeus to fill the gap in the opposite position left by the departure of Saskia Hippe. With the Piraeus team, Milica Kubura won the Hellenic Cup in 2024, while the following season she achieved the greek treble, winning the Super Cup, the Cup and the Hellenic Championship as well.

== International career ==
Milica Kumbura first played for the Serbia U-18 national team in 2010, winning the bronze medal at the 2011 U-18 World Championship, and a year later, she won the silver medal at the 2012 European U-20 Championship. In 2019, she participated with the Serbian national team in the new competition of Nations League.

== Sporting achievements ==
=== National team ===
- 2011 U-18 World Championship Ankara, Turkey
- 2012 U-20 European Championship Ankara, Turkey

=== Clubs ===
==== National championships ====
- 2011/2012 Serbian Championship, with Crvena Zvezda Belgrade
- 2012/2013 Serbian Championship, with Crvena Zvezda Belgrade
- 2022/2023 Hellenic Championship, with Olympiacos Piraeus
- 2023/2024 Hellenic Championship, with Olympiacos Piraeus
- 2024/2025 Hellenic Championship, with Olympiacos Piraeus

==== National trophies ====
- 2011/2012 Serbian Cup, with Crvena Zvezda Belgrade
- 2012/2013 Serbian Cup, with Crvena Zvezda Belgrade
- 2019/2020 German Cup, with Dresdner SC
- 2020/2021 Hellenic Cup, with PAOK Thessaloniki
- 2023/2024 Hellenic Cup, with Olympiacos Piraeus
- 2024 Hellenic Super Cup, with Olympiacos Piraeus
- 2024/2025 Hellenic Cup, with Olympiacos Piraeus

=== Individuals ===
- 2024Hellenic Super Cup: MVP
- 2024/25 Hellenic Cup: MVP
- 2024/25 Hellenic Championship: MVP
