= Aleksandra Uzelac =

Serbian volleyball player

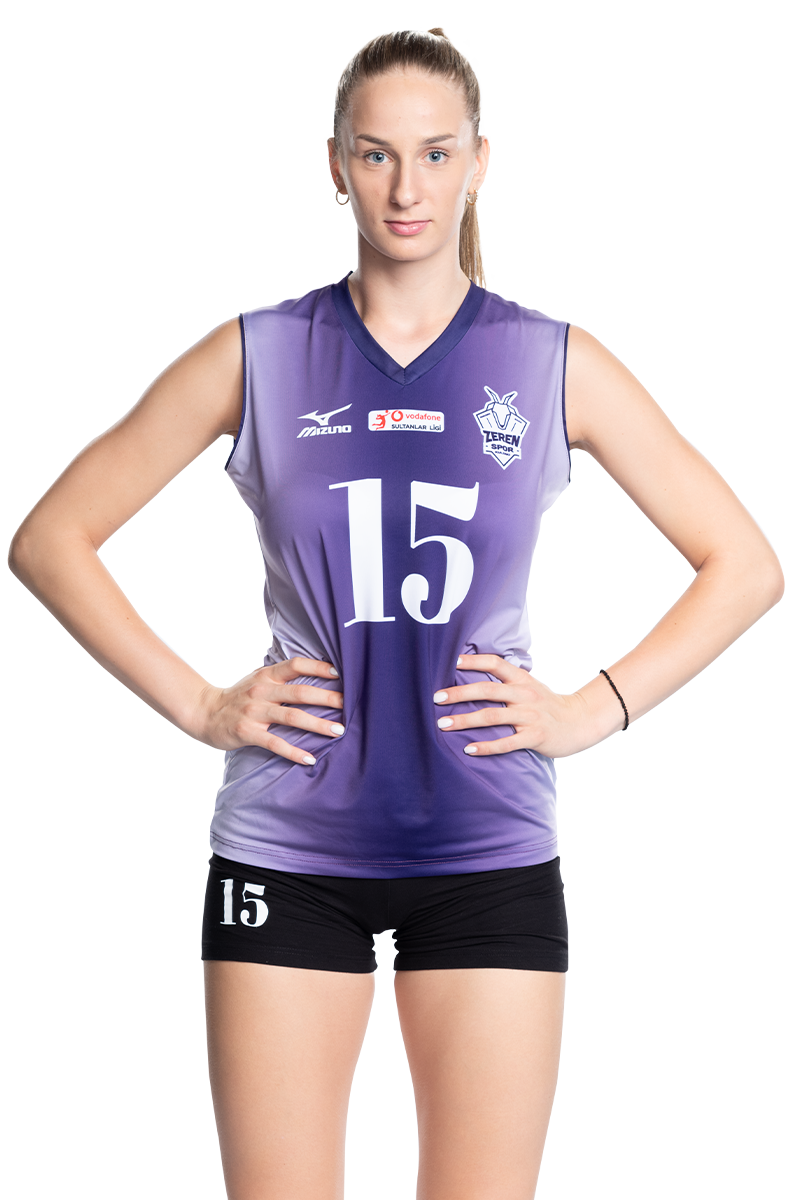

Personal information
- Born: 27 July 2004 (age 22) Zrenjanin, Serbia and Montenegro
- Height: 1.88 m (6 ft 2 in)
- Weight: 74 kg (163 lb)
- Spike: 315 cm (124 in)
- Block: 310 cm (120 in)

Volleyball information
- Position: Outside hitter
- Current club: (Turkey) Eczacıbaşı
- Number: 9 (national team), 15 (club)

Career
- Years: Team
- 2016–2020 2020–2023 2023–2024 2024–2026 2026-: OK Bagljaš 023; ŽOK Železničar; Fluminense; Zeren; Eczacıbaşı

National team
- Years: Team
- 2022–: Serbia
Honours
Women's volleyball
Representing Serbia
European Championship
Silver medal – second place	2023 Belgium/Estonia/Germany/Italy	Team
Bronze medal – third place	2026 Azerbaijan/Czech Republic/Sweden/Turkey
U21 World Championship
Silver medal – second place	2021 Rotterdam
Junior European Championship
Silver medal – second place	2020 Zenica
Silver medal – second place	2022 Skopje
Youth European Championship
Bronze medal – third place	2020 Podgorica

Aleksandra Uzelac (Serbian Cyrillic: Александра Узелац; born 27 July 2004) is a Serbian volleyball player who plays as outside hitter for Turkish League side Eczacıbaşı.

== International career ==
Uzelac is a member of the Serbia women's national volleyball team. In 2023 she participated at the 2023 Nations League.

Uzelac playing for Fluminense in Brazil was robbed twice in Rio de Janeiro in the space of ten days in February 2024.

Uzelac played for Ankara based Sports club Zeren for two seasons. She had a successful two seasons and competed in the 2026 Champions League and led Zeren to a historic fourth place finish in the turkish league.

In June 2026, Uzelac and Zeren parted ways after two seasons. She has signed with Eczacibasi for the 2026/2027 season.

== Personal life ==
As of 2026, Uzelac is in a relationship with Bulgarian volleyball player Simeon Nikolov.

== Awards ==
=== Club ===
OK Železničar

- Serbian Cup: 2021
- Serbian SuperCup: 2022

=== Individual ===
Club

- 2022 Serbian Cup – Best outside hitter
- 2022 Serbian SuperCup – MVP
- 2023 Serbian League – Best scorer
- 2023 Serbian League – Best server

National team

- 2022 Balkan Championships U19 – Best scorer
- 2022 Balkan Championships U19 – MVP
- 2022 Women's U19 European Championship – Best outside hitter
