= Darko Zakoč =

Serbian volleyball coach (born 1963)

Personal information
- Nationality: Serbian
- Born: 24 May 1963 (age 63); Titovo Užice, Serbia, Yugoslavia

Volleyball information
- Position: Head coach
- Current club: PAOK Thessaloniki

Career
Years
- 1992–1996
- 1996–1997
- 1996–2001
- 1997–2005
- 2005–2009
- 2009–2013
- 2010–2012
- 2013–2014
- 2014–2021
- 2021–2023
- 2023–
Teams
- OK Jedinstvo Užice
- Serbia
- City Moda Bari
- OK Jedinstvo Užice
- Postar 064 Belgrade
- C.S. Tomis Constanța
- Romania
- OK Partizan Vizura
- CSM Volei Alba Blaj
- ŽOK Partizan
- PAOK Thessaloniki

Darko Zakoč (born 24 May 1963) is a Serbian volleyball coach. He has been coaching Greek side PAOK Thessaloniki since 2023.

Zakoč coached the Serbia and Montenegro women's national team between 1996 and 2001. He was then manager of the Romanian women's national team from 2010 to 2012.

He was given the award of Cetățean de onoare ("Honorary Citizen") of the city of Blaj in 2017.

In May 2018, Darko Zakoč led CSM Volei Alba Blaj to runner-up finish at CEV Champions League finals.

== Honours ==
CSM Volei Alba Blaj

- Romanian Division: 2015, 2016, 2017

Partizan Vizura

- Serbian League: 2014

2004 Tomis Constanța

- Romanian Division: 2011, 2012

Poštar 064 Beograd

- Serbian League: 2006, 2007, 2008, 2009

Jedinstvo Užice

- Serbian League: 1994, 1995, 1996, 1997, 1998, 1999, 2000, 2001
