= 2015 FIVB Volleyball Girls' U18 World Championship squads =

This article shows the rosters of all participating teams at the Girls' U18 World Championship 2015 in Peru.

== Pool A ==
=== Peru ===
The following is the Peruvian roster in the 2015 FIVB Volleyball Girls' U18 World Championship.

Head coach: Walter Lung

No.	Name	Date of birth	Height	Weight	Spike	Block	2015 club
3	Katherine Regalado	11 March 1998	1.87 m (6 ft 2 in)	66 kg (146 lb)	291 cm (115 in)	284 cm (112 in)	(Peru) Alianza Lima
4	Nicole Abreu	27 March 1999	1.80 m (5 ft 11 in)	63 kg (139 lb)	285 cm (112 in)	270 cm (110 in)	(Peru) Universidad César Vallejo
5	Valentina Carrasco	20 July 1998	1.68 m (5 ft 6 in)	61 kg (134 lb)	253 cm (100 in)	270 cm (110 in)	(Peru) Universidad San Martin
6	Maricarmen Guerrero	17 January 1999	1.81 m (5 ft 11 in)	70 kg (150 lb)	290 cm (110 in)	280 cm (110 in)	(Peru) Túpac Amaru
7	Lucia Magallanes (C)	1 September 1998	1.77 m (5 ft 10 in)	70 kg (150 lb)	278 cm (109 in)	273 cm (107 in)	(Peru) Sporting Cristal
9	Xiomeli Valencia	20 May 1998	1.75 m (5 ft 9 in)	73 kg (161 lb)	280 cm (110 in)	296 cm (117 in)	(Peru) Túpac Amaru
10	Maria Castillo	6 March 1999	1.72 m (5 ft 8 in)	68 kg (150 lb)	268 cm (106 in)	274 cm (108 in)	(Peru) Túpac Amaru
11	Kiara Montes	13 January 2001	1.76 m (5 ft 9 in)	68 kg (150 lb)	282 cm (111 in)	293 cm (115 in)	(Peru) Sporting Cristal
12	Leslie Leyva	6 December 1998	1.75 m (5 ft 9 in)	72 kg (159 lb)	280 cm (110 in)	300 cm (120 in)	(Peru) Universidad San Martin
13	Claudia Palza	4 July 2001	1.79 m (5 ft 10 in)	71 kg (157 lb)	288 cm (113 in)	280 cm (110 in)	(Peru) Géminis
14	Diana De La Peña	7 June 1999	1.87 m (6 ft 2 in)	60 kg (130 lb)	294 cm (116 in)	295 cm (116 in)	(Peru) Géminis
15	Reyshel Zea	24 April 1998	1.77 m (5 ft 10 in)	63 kg (139 lb)	278 cm (109 in)	290 cm (110 in)	(Peru) Géminis

=== South Korea ===
The following is the Korean roster in the 2015 FIVB Volleyball Girls' U18 World Championship.

Head coach: Kim Dongyeol

No.	Name	Date of birth	Height	Weight	Spike	Block	2015 club
1	Woo Sumin	7 November 1998	1.77 m (5 ft 10 in)	66 kg (146 lb)	288 cm (113 in)	280 cm (110 in)	(South Korea) Sehwa girls' high school
2	Lee Miae	7 March 1998	1.72 m (5 ft 8 in)	74 kg (163 lb)	285 cm (112 in)	275 cm (108 in)	(South Korea) Gangneung girls' high school
3	An Hyejin	16 February 1998	1.75 m (5 ft 9 in)	60 kg (130 lb)	290 cm (110 in)	280 cm (110 in)	(South Korea) Gangneung girls' high school
6	Kim Chaerin	21 February 1998	1.66 m (5 ft 5 in)	62 kg (137 lb)	270 cm (110 in)	260 cm (100 in)	(South Korea) Wongok high school
7	Park Seyun	15 July 1998	1.77 m (5 ft 10 in)	68 kg (150 lb)	273 cm (107 in)	255 cm (100 in)	(South Korea) Joongang Girls' High School
9	Jeong Sunah	30 September 1998	1.85 m (6 ft 1 in)	68 kg (150 lb)	296 cm (117 in)	286 cm (113 in)	(South Korea) Mokpo commercial high school
10	Ko Minji (C)	27 April 1998	1.72 m (5 ft 8 in)	60 kg (130 lb)	283 cm (111 in)	277 cm (109 in)	(South Korea) Daegu girls' high school
13	Ha Hyorim	16 April 1998	1.71 m (5 ft 7 in)	62 kg (137 lb)	279 cm (110 in)	271 cm (107 in)	(South Korea) Wongok high school
14	Kim Juhyang	27 March 1999	1.82 m (6 ft 0 in)	59 kg (130 lb)	283 cm (111 in)	274 cm (108 in)	(South Korea) Gwangju PE high school
15	Lee Seonjeong	5 February 1998	1.82 m (6 ft 0 in)	73 kg (161 lb)	290 cm (110 in)	280 cm (110 in)	(South Korea) Sunmyung girls' high school
16	Lee Solah	11 August 1998	1.74 m (5 ft 9 in)	58 kg (128 lb)	285 cm (112 in)	280 cm (110 in)	(South Korea) Sehwa girls' high school
18	Yoo Seoyeun	12 January 1999	1.75 m (5 ft 9 in)	62 kg (137 lb)	285 cm (112 in)	276 cm (109 in)	(South Korea) Sunmyung girls' high school

=== Egypt ===
The following is the Egyptian roster in the 2015 FIVB Volleyball Girls' U18 World Championship.

Head Coach: Mohamed Abdeen

No.	Name	Date of birth	Height	Weight	Spike	Block	2015 club
1	Zeina Elelemy	1 January 2000	1.80 m (5 ft 11 in)	70 kg (150 lb)	0 cm (0 in)	0 cm (0 in)	(Egypt) Shooting Club
2	Reem Elmohandes	28 September 1999	1.75 m (5 ft 9 in)	67 kg (148 lb)	259 cm (102 in)	249 cm (98 in)	(Egypt) Al Ahly
4	Nada Meawad (C)	12 April 1998	1.80 m (5 ft 11 in)	71 kg (157 lb)	277 cm (109 in)	267 cm (105 in)	(Egypt) Al Shams
6	Mayar Mohamed	5 February 2000	1.86 m (6 ft 1 in)	78 kg (172 lb)	0 cm (0 in)	0 cm (0 in)	(Egypt) Al Ahly
7	Noura Moawad	12 April 1998	1.82 m (6 ft 0 in)	80 kg (180 lb)	0 cm (0 in)	0 cm (0 in)	(Egypt) Al Shams
8	Rana Elawa	1 January 1998	1.74 m (5 ft 9 in)	60 kg (130 lb)	0 cm (0 in)	0 cm (0 in)	(Egypt) Shooting Club
9	Hanya Elshebeny	6 June 1999	1.70 m (5 ft 7 in)	60 kg (130 lb)	0 cm (0 in)	0 cm (0 in)	(Egypt) Al Shams
11	Maya Ahmed	8 March 1998	1.78 m (5 ft 10 in)	66 kg (146 lb)	0 cm (0 in)	0 cm (0 in)	(Egypt) Al Ahly
13	Nourallah Amin	25 November 2000	1.86 m (6 ft 1 in)	70 kg (150 lb)	286 cm (113 in)	275 cm (108 in)	(Egypt) Al Ahly
15	Youmna Sabik	21 August 1998	1.63 m (5 ft 4 in)	51 kg (112 lb)	0 cm (0 in)	0 cm (0 in)	(Egypt) Al Shams
17	Salma Mahmoud	4 February 1999	1.75 m (5 ft 9 in)	56 kg (123 lb)	0 cm (0 in)	0 cm (0 in)	(Egypt) Al Ahly
20	Mariam Morsy	2 January 1999	1.87 m (6 ft 2 in)	83 kg (183 lb)	289 cm (114 in)	269 cm (106 in)	(Egypt) Al Ahly

=== Mexico ===
The following is the Mexican roster in the 2015 FIVB Volleyball Girls' U18 World Championship.

Head Coach: Ricardo Naranjo

No.	Name	Date of birth	Height	Weight	Spike	Block	2015 club
1	Luz Mendivil	19 March 1998	1.65 m (5 ft 5 in)	60 kg (130 lb)	200 cm (79 in)	210 cm (83 in)	(Mexico) Sinaola
3	Alejandra Salinas	4 April 1998	1.64 m (5 ft 5 in)	58 kg (128 lb)	255 cm (100 in)	235 cm (93 in)	(Mexico) Nuevo Leon
4	Yerania Gutierrez	13 January 1998	1.68 m (5 ft 6 in)	59 kg (130 lb)	213 cm (84 in)	199 cm (78 in)	(Mexico) Colima
5	Marla Arreola	18 July 1999	1.61 m (5 ft 3 in)	59 kg (130 lb)	250 cm (98 in)	230 cm (91 in)	(Mexico) Baja California
6	Karla Mireles	25 January 2000	1.78 m (5 ft 10 in)	60 kg (130 lb)	270 cm (110 in)	250 cm (98 in)	(Mexico) Nuevo Leon
8	Sirenia Gómez	24 May 1999	1.79 m (5 ft 10 in)	78 kg (172 lb)	282 cm (111 in)	271 cm (107 in)	(Mexico) Nuevo Leon
9	Kathya Garcia	6 March 1998	1.75 m (5 ft 9 in)	68 kg (150 lb)	286 cm (113 in)	275 cm (108 in)	(Mexico) Chihuahua
15	Karen Rivera	22 May 1999	1.63 m (5 ft 4 in)	56 kg (123 lb)	212 cm (83 in)	207 cm (81 in)	(Mexico) Chihuahua
16	Angela Muñoz	10 November 2000	1.78 m (5 ft 10 in)	50 kg (110 lb)	260 cm (100 in)	247 cm (97 in)	(Mexico) Nuevo Leon
17	Karina Flores (C)	16 August 1998	1.94 m (6 ft 4 in)	72 kg (159 lb)	293 cm (115 in)	288 cm (113 in)	(Mexico) Nuevo Leon
18	Alondra Amaro	9 June 1998	1.88 m (6 ft 2 in)	69 kg (152 lb)	275 cm (108 in)	250 cm (98 in)	(Mexico) Durango
20	Gabriela Pérez	17 May 1998	1.82 m (6 ft 0 in)	75 kg (165 lb)	284 cm (112 in)	279 cm (110 in)	(Mexico) D.F.

=== Chinese Taipei ===
The following is the Taiwanese roster in the 2015 FIVB Volleyball Girls' U18 World Championship.

Head Coach: Chin-Tu Kuang

No.	Name	Date of birth	Height	Weight	Spike	Block	2015 club
1	Chen Tzu Yun	9 April 1999	1.69 m (5 ft 7 in)	61 kg (134 lb)	285 cm (112 in)	276 cm (109 in)	Chinese Taipei
4	Huang Chen Yu (C)	25 February 1998	1.78 m (5 ft 10 in)	56 kg (123 lb)	300 cm (120 in)	290 cm (110 in)	Chinese Taipei
5	Pan Wo Ting	27 May 1999	1.72 m (5 ft 8 in)	56 kg (123 lb)	288 cm (113 in)	280 cm (110 in)	Chinese Taipei
6	Chang Jia Ling	29 September 1999	1.77 m (5 ft 10 in)	73 kg (161 lb)	300 cm (120 in)	292 cm (115 in)	Chinese Taipei
8	Liao Ying Chun	28 January 1999	1.74 m (5 ft 9 in)	59 kg (130 lb)	288 cm (113 in)	281 cm (111 in)	Chinese Taipei
9	Chen Jia Man	27 July 1999	1.67 m (5 ft 6 in)	57 kg (126 lb)	273 cm (107 in)	270 cm (110 in)	Chinese Taipei
10	Chen Yu Chieh	12 November 2000	1.72 m (5 ft 8 in)	55 kg (121 lb)	295 cm (116 in)	288 cm (113 in)	Chinese Taipei
12	Tsai Yi Hsuan	20 September 1998	1.76 m (5 ft 9 in)	71 kg (157 lb)	290 cm (110 in)	283 cm (111 in)	Chinese Taipei
13	Liu Kuei Ling	28 January 1998	1.60 m (5 ft 3 in)	56 kg (123 lb)	275 cm (108 in)	268 cm (106 in)	Chinese Taipei
14	Huang Man Ya	10 October 1999	1.78 m (5 ft 10 in)	56 kg (123 lb)	191 cm (75 in)	185 cm (73 in)	Chinese Taipei
15	Wei Pei Hsuan	22 December 1998	1.76 m (5 ft 9 in)	63 kg (139 lb)	300 cm (120 in)	292 cm (115 in)	Chinese Taipei
20	Huang Ching Hsuan	16 November 1998	1.80 m (5 ft 11 in)	64 kg (141 lb)	305 cm (120 in)	300 cm (120 in)	Chinese Taipei

== Pool B ==
=== Germany ===
The following is the German roster in the 2015 FIVB Volleyball Girls' U18 World Championship.

Head Coach: Jens Tietböhl

No.	Name	Date of birth	Height	Weight	Spike	Block	2015 club
1	Vanessa Agbortabi	4 December 1998	1.80 m (5 ft 11 in)	65 kg (143 lb)	298 cm (117 in)	283 cm (111 in)	(Germany) VCO Berlin
2	Pia Kästner	29 June 1998	1.82 m (6 ft 0 in)	68 kg (150 lb)	297 cm (117 in)	286 cm (113 in)	(Germany) VC Olympia Berlin
5	Sabrina Krause	18 December 1998	1.96 m (6 ft 5 in)	71 kg (157 lb)	307 cm (121 in)	295 cm (116 in)	(Germany) VCO Schwerin
6	Sophie Dreblow	9 July 1998	1.67 m (5 ft 6 in)	65 kg (143 lb)	270 cm (110 in)	260 cm (100 in)	(Germany) SC Potsdam
7	Pia Leweling (C)	4 January 1998	1.82 m (6 ft 0 in)	67 kg (148 lb)	295 cm (116 in)	282 cm (111 in)	(Germany) USC Münster
8	Sindy Lenz	3 October 1998	1.85 m (6 ft 1 in)	70 kg (150 lb)	300 cm (120 in)	288 cm (113 in)	(Germany) VCO Berlin
10	Esther Spöler	12 July 1998	1.84 m (6 ft 0 in)	70 kg (150 lb)	296 cm (117 in)	283 cm (111 in)	(Germany) RC Borken
11	Merle Weidt	20 July 1999	1.86 m (6 ft 1 in)	64 kg (141 lb)	297 cm (117 in)	286 cm (113 in)	(Germany) VCO Berlin
12	Hanna Orthmann	3 October 1998	1.85 m (6 ft 1 in)	69 kg (152 lb)	302 cm (119 in)	291 cm (115 in)	(Germany) USC Münster
13	Aisha Skinner	16 April 1999	1.83 m (6 ft 0 in)	64 kg (141 lb)	300 cm (120 in)	290 cm (110 in)	(Germany) VCO Berlin
14	Elisa Lohmann	22 July 1998	1.74 m (5 ft 9 in)	60 kg (130 lb)	290 cm (110 in)	278 cm (109 in)	(Germany) VCO Schwerin
18	Julika Hoffmann	25 May 1998	1.84 m (6 ft 0 in)	68 kg (150 lb)	297 cm (117 in)	286 cm (113 in)	(Germany) MTV Stuttgart

=== China ===
The following is the Chinese roster in the 2015 FIVB Volleyball Girls' U18 World Championship.

Head Coach: Shen Mang

No.	Name	Date of birth	Height	Weight	Spike	Block	2015 club
1	Li Yingying	19 February 2000	1.92 m (6 ft 4 in)	71 kg (157 lb)	302 cm (119 in)	294 cm (116 in)	(China) Tianjin
2	Liu Jiayuan	9 May 1998	1.81 m (5 ft 11 in)	80 kg (180 lb)	281 cm (111 in)	276 cm (109 in)	(China) Shandong
4	Qian Jingwen (C)	11 May 1998	1.86 m (6 ft 1 in)	70 kg (150 lb)	305 cm (120 in)	297 cm (117 in)	(China) Shandong
5	Jiang Jing	4 March 1998	1.74 m (5 ft 9 in)	80 kg (180 lb)	297 cm (117 in)	291 cm (115 in)	(China) Shanghai
6	Zhang Yuqian	18 August 1998	1.85 m (6 ft 1 in)	72 kg (159 lb)	302 cm (119 in)	294 cm (116 in)	(China) Shanghai
7	Xie Xing	28 November 1998	1.84 m (6 ft 0 in)	68 kg (150 lb)	271 cm (107 in)	265 cm (104 in)	(China) Jiangsu
9	Ouyang Qianqian	15 January 1998	1.85 m (6 ft 1 in)	70 kg (150 lb)	303 cm (119 in)	296 cm (117 in)	(China) Army
10	Zang Qianqian	14 August 1998	1.74 m (5 ft 9 in)	60 kg (130 lb)	271 cm (107 in)	265 cm (104 in)	(China) Jiangsu
11	Xu Jianan	2 April 1998	1.67 m (5 ft 6 in)	60 kg (130 lb)	301 cm (119 in)	293 cm (115 in)	(China) Liaoning
12	Wu Han	23 April 1998	1.83 m (6 ft 0 in)	64 kg (141 lb)	294 cm (116 in)	284 cm (112 in)	(China) Jiangsu
13	Gao Yi	22 July 1998	1.93 m (6 ft 4 in)	66 kg (146 lb)	304 cm (120 in)	298 cm (117 in)	(China) Army
15	Zhang Zihan	2 May 2000	1.84 m (6 ft 0 in)	75 kg (165 lb)	291 cm (115 in)	282 cm (111 in)	(China) Henan

=== Serbia ===
The following is the Serbian roster in the 2015 FIVB Volleyball Girls' U18 World Championship.

Head Coach: Jovo Caković

No.	Name	Date of birth	Height	Weight	Spike	Block	2015 club
2	Katarina Lazović (C)	12 September 1999	1.75 m (5 ft 9 in)	50 kg (110 lb)	280 cm (110 in)	275 cm (108 in)	(Serbia) Vizura Beograd
3	Ana Martinovic	7 March 1998	1.80 m (5 ft 11 in)	62 kg (137 lb)	280 cm (110 in)	275 cm (108 in)	(Serbia) Vizura Beograd
4	Ana Jakšić	10 March 1998	1.78 m (5 ft 10 in)	64 kg (141 lb)	285 cm (112 in)	280 cm (110 in)	(Serbia) Crvena Zvezda Beograd
5	Tijana Milojević	10 September 1998	1.71 m (5 ft 7 in)	53 kg (117 lb)	270 cm (110 in)	264 cm (104 in)	(Serbia) Crvena Zvezda Beograd
6	Ljubica Milojević	13 February 1999	1.90 m (6 ft 3 in)	70 kg (150 lb)	300 cm (120 in)	287 cm (113 in)	(Serbia) Kralj Beograd
7	Jovana Kocić	24 February 1998	1.85 m (6 ft 1 in)	64 kg (141 lb)	290 cm (110 in)	285 cm (112 in)	(Serbia) Vizura Beograd
8	Anastasija Sekulić	31 July 1999	1.80 m (5 ft 11 in)	58 kg (128 lb)	280 cm (110 in)	270 cm (110 in)	(Serbia) Crvena Zvezda Beograd
9	Tamara Radmilović	9 June 1999	1.84 m (6 ft 0 in)	64 kg (141 lb)	280 cm (110 in)	275 cm (108 in)	(Serbia) Crvena Zvezda Beograd
10	Anđela Veselinović	5 February 1999	1.73 m (5 ft 8 in)	55 kg (121 lb)	270 cm (110 in)	265 cm (104 in)	(Serbia) Vizura Beograd
11	Milica Tasic	24 December 1999	1.83 m (6 ft 0 in)	62 kg (137 lb)	285 cm (112 in)	280 cm (110 in)	(Serbia) Crvena Zvezda Beograd
14	Anja Asonja	4 October 1999	1.90 m (6 ft 3 in)	75 kg (165 lb)	290 cm (110 in)	285 cm (112 in)	(Serbia) Crvena Zvezda Beograd
18	Tijana Stojković	3 September 1999	1.84 m (6 ft 0 in)	58 kg (128 lb)	295 cm (116 in)	280 cm (110 in)	(Serbia) Dinamo Pancevo

=== Poland ===
The following is the Polish roster in the 2015 FIVB Volleyball Girls' U18 World Championship.

Head Coach: Andrzej Pec

No.	Name	Date of birth	Height	Weight	Spike	Block	2015 club
1	Oliwia Michalak	27 May 1998	1.90 m (6 ft 3 in)	89 kg (196 lb)	308 cm (121 in)	291 cm (115 in)	(Poland) MUKS Dargfil Tomaszow mazowieck
2	Julia Nowicka	21 October 1998	1.74 m (5 ft 9 in)	58 kg (128 lb)	295 cm (116 in)	278 cm (109 in)	(Poland) SPS Politechnika Czestochowska
4	Natalia Murek (C)	8 September 1999	1.80 m (5 ft 11 in)	73 kg (161 lb)	302 cm (119 in)	283 cm (111 in)	(Poland) SPS Politechnika Czestochowska
5	Adrianna Muszynska	22 March 1998	1.87 m (6 ft 2 in)	72 kg (159 lb)	310 cm (120 in)	298 cm (117 in)	(Poland) Volley Plock
6	Aleksandra Rasinka	6 November 1998	1.90 m (6 ft 3 in)	78 kg (172 lb)	310 cm (120 in)	289 cm (114 in)	(Poland) LTS Legionovia Legionowo
8	Weronika Sobiczewska	6 May 1999	1.83 m (6 ft 0 in)	60 kg (130 lb)	304 cm (120 in)	285 cm (112 in)	(Poland) UKS Osemka Siedlce
12	Paulina Swider	21 October 1999	1.84 m (6 ft 0 in)	69 kg (152 lb)	301 cm (119 in)	287 cm (113 in)	(Poland) UKS Sobieski Lublin
13	Martyna Swirad	1 May 1998	1.83 m (6 ft 0 in)	72 kg (159 lb)	301 cm (119 in)	287 cm (113 in)	(Poland) MKS San - Pajda Jaroslaw
14	Agata Michalewicz	28 April 1998	1.81 m (5 ft 11 in)	63 kg (139 lb)	293 cm (115 in)	278 cm (109 in)	(Poland) UKS Orzel Malbork
17	Monika Fedusio	6 November 1999	1.82 m (6 ft 0 in)	77 kg (170 lb)	299 cm (118 in)	282 cm (111 in)	(Poland) UKS Orzel Malbork
18	Justyna Lysiak	20 January 1999	1.68 m (5 ft 6 in)	51 kg (112 lb)	271 cm (107 in)	263 cm (104 in)	(Poland) UKS Jedynka Kluczbork
19	Maria Stenzel	25 November 1998	1.68 m (5 ft 6 in)	53 kg (117 lb)	273 cm (107 in)	261 cm (103 in)	(Poland) UKS ZSMS Poznan

=== Thailand ===
The following is the Thai roster in the 2015 FIVB Volleyball Girls' U18 World Championship.

Head Coach: Tanasak Ratanarasi

No.	Name	Date of birth	Height	Weight	Spike	Block	2015 club
1	Anisa Yotpinit	23 June 1998	1.64 m (5 ft 5 in)	58 kg (128 lb)	245 cm (96 in)	265 cm (104 in)	(Thailand) Sisaket VC
3	Wipawee Srithong	28 January 1999	1.74 m (5 ft 9 in)	64 kg (141 lb)	288 cm (113 in)	276 cm (109 in)	(Thailand) Supreme VC
7	Sumalee Yingsrisuk	11 December 1999	1.76 m (5 ft 9 in)	63 kg (139 lb)	287 cm (113 in)	273 cm (107 in)	(Thailand) Ayutthaya A.T.C.C
8	Tirawan Sang-Ob	26 April 1998	1.77 m (5 ft 10 in)	60 kg (130 lb)	285 cm (112 in)	275 cm (108 in)	(Thailand) Supreme VC
9	Chutimon Sagon	2 October 1998	1.71 m (5 ft 7 in)	53 kg (117 lb)	282 cm (111 in)	269 cm (106 in)	(Thailand) Sisaket VC
10	Thanacha Sooksod	26 May 2000	1.81 m (5 ft 11 in)	70 kg (150 lb)	283 cm (111 in)	275 cm (108 in)	(Thailand) Supreme VC
11	Napatsorn Amarinrat	12 June 1999	1.76 m (5 ft 9 in)	68 kg (150 lb)	280 cm (110 in)	272 cm (107 in)	(Thailand) Supreme VC
12	Kanjana Hookampang	12 April 1999	1.70 m (5 ft 7 in)	58 kg (128 lb)	291 cm (115 in)	279 cm (110 in)	(Thailand) Sisaket VC
13	Natthanicha Jaisaen (C)	21 May 1998	1.72 m (5 ft 8 in)	55 kg (121 lb)	283 cm (111 in)	276 cm (109 in)	(Thailand) Bangkok Glass VC
14	Kanittha Juangjan	16 January 1998	1.76 m (5 ft 9 in)	64 kg (141 lb)	315 cm (124 in)	290 cm (110 in)	(Thailand) Sisaket VC
16	Khwanrada Seedokboub	12 July 1999	1.76 m (5 ft 9 in)	65 kg (143 lb)	278 cm (109 in)	263 cm (104 in)	(Thailand) Supreme VC
17	Siriyakorn Aupradit	31 March 1998	1.82 m (6 ft 0 in)	69 kg (152 lb)	295 cm (116 in)	283 cm (111 in)	(Thailand) Thai-Danish-Nongrua VC

== Pool C ==
=== Russia ===
The following is the Russian roster in the 2015 FIVB Volleyball Girls' U18 World Championship.

Head Coach: Svetlana Safronova

No.	Name	Date of birth	Height	Weight	Spike	Block	2015 club
1	Angelina Lazarenko	13 April 1998	1.93 m (6 ft 4 in)	77 kg (170 lb)	317 cm (125 in)	302 cm (119 in)	(Russia) Luch
2	Ksenia Smirnova	24 April 1998	1.87 m (6 ft 2 in)	75 kg (165 lb)	299 cm (118 in)	287 cm (113 in)	(Russia) Luch
3	Inna Balyko	16 July 1998	1.83 m (6 ft 0 in)	68 kg (150 lb)	298 cm (117 in)	286 cm (113 in)	(Russia) Luch
5	Anastasia Stalnaya	1 June 1998	1.90 m (6 ft 3 in)	72 kg (159 lb)	306 cm (120 in)	298 cm (117 in)	(Russia) Luch
6	Elizaveta Kotova	31 May 1998	1.86 m (6 ft 1 in)	81 kg (179 lb)	303 cm (119 in)	289 cm (114 in)	(Russia) Luch
7	Maria Bogomolova	28 May 1998	1.85 m (6 ft 1 in)	63 kg (139 lb)	310 cm (120 in)	290 cm (110 in)	(Russia) Luch
9	Ksenia Pligunova	24 March 1998	1.81 m (5 ft 11 in)	69 kg (152 lb)	298 cm (117 in)	290 cm (110 in)	(Russia) Omichka
10	Angelina Emelina	10 June 1998	1.86 m (6 ft 1 in)	83 kg (183 lb)	298 cm (117 in)	290 cm (110 in)	(Russia) Luch
12	Daria Ryseva (C)	5 March 1998	1.75 m (5 ft 9 in)	69 kg (152 lb)	282 cm (111 in)	266 cm (105 in)	(Russia) Luch
13	Asiiat Shakhmirova	19 November 1998	1.77 m (5 ft 10 in)	63 kg (139 lb)	294 cm (116 in)	275 cm (108 in)	(Russia) Severyanka
16	Maria Vorobyeva	24 February 1998	1.83 m (6 ft 0 in)	71 kg (157 lb)	306 cm (120 in)	296 cm (117 in)	(Russia) Luch
19	Aleksandra Oganezova	12 May 1998	1.73 m (5 ft 8 in)	65 kg (143 lb)	287 cm (113 in)	266 cm (105 in)	(Russia) Zarechie

=== United States ===
The following is the American roster in the 2015 FIVB Volleyball Girls' U18 World Championship.

Head Coach: James Stone

No.	Name	Date of birth	Height	Weight	Spike	Block	2015 club
1	Brionne Butler	29 January 1999	1.90 m (6 ft 3 in)	70 kg (150 lb)	325 cm (128 in)	305 cm (120 in)	(United States) Texstar Volleyball Club
2	Tiffany Clark	18 February 1998	1.80 m (5 ft 11 in)	66 kg (146 lb)	295 cm (116 in)	274 cm (108 in)	(United States) Sports Performance
3	Paige Hammons	21 October 1998	1.88 m (6 ft 2 in)	54 kg (119 lb)	307 cm (121 in)	297 cm (117 in)	(United States) KIVA
6	Morgan Hentz	27 July 1998	1.75 m (5 ft 9 in)	66 kg (146 lb)	300 cm (120 in)	279 cm (110 in)	(United States) Northern Kentucky VB Club
7	Sydney Hilley	24 July 1998	1.80 m (5 ft 11 in)	68 kg (150 lb)	300 cm (120 in)	284 cm (112 in)	(United States) Minnesota Select
8	Khalia Lanier	19 September 1998	1.88 m (6 ft 2 in)	82 kg (181 lb)	307 cm (121 in)	295 cm (116 in)	(United States) Arizona Storm
9	Madison Lilley	15 April 1999	1.80 m (5 ft 11 in)	64 kg (141 lb)	305 cm (120 in)	292 cm (115 in)	(United States) KC Power
12	Regan Pittman	18 March 1998	1.93 m (6 ft 4 in)	84 kg (185 lb)	317 cm (125 in)	310 cm (120 in)	(United States) KC Power
13	Stephanie Samedy	27 September 1998	1.88 m (6 ft 2 in)	80 kg (180 lb)	320 cm (130 in)	290 cm (110 in)	(United States) Top Select Volleyball Academy
14	Kathryn Plummer (C)	16 October 1998	1.99 m (6 ft 6 in)	88 kg (194 lb)	314 cm (124 in)	300 cm (120 in)	(United States) Tstreet Volleyball Club
19	Ronika Stone	7 June 1998	1.88 m (6 ft 2 in)	77 kg (170 lb)	310 cm (120 in)	302 cm (119 in)	(United States) Vision Volleyball Club
20	Alexis Sun	19 September 1998	1.90 m (6 ft 3 in)	68 kg (150 lb)	317 cm (125 in)	307 cm (121 in)	(United States) Coast Volleyball Club

=== Belgium ===
The following is the Belgian roster in the 2015 FIVB Volleyball Girls' U18 World Championship.

Head Coach: Fien Callens

No.	Name	Date of birth	Height	Weight	Spike	Block	2015 club
1	Amber De Tant	22 March 1998	1.77 m (5 ft 10 in)	66 kg (146 lb)	303 cm (119 in)	280 cm (110 in)	(Belgium) Asterix Kieldrecht
2	Silke Van Avermaet	2 June 1999	1.93 m (6 ft 4 in)	71 kg (157 lb)	311 cm (122 in)	290 cm (110 in)	(Belgium) Asterix Kieldrecht
3	Charlotte Coppin (C)	1 December 1998	1.85 m (6 ft 1 in)	65 kg (143 lb)	300 cm (120 in)	283 cm (111 in)	(Belgium) TSV Vilvoorde
4	Britt Herbots	29 April 1999	1.81 m (5 ft 11 in)	60 kg (130 lb)	308 cm (121 in)	283 cm (111 in)	(Belgium) Asterix Kieldrecht
6	Laure Flament	18 June 1998	1.81 m (5 ft 11 in)	75 kg (165 lb)	298 cm (117 in)	273 cm (107 in)	(Belgium) VDK Gent Dames
8	Bieke Kindt	11 February 2000	1.88 m (6 ft 2 in)	70 kg (150 lb)	306 cm (120 in)	285 cm (112 in)	(Belgium) TSV Vilvoorde
9	Lisa Van Den Vonder	7 September 1998	1.82 m (6 ft 0 in)	65 kg (143 lb)	293 cm (115 in)	278 cm (109 in)	(Belgium) Asterix Kieldrecht
11	Manon Stragier	12 March 1999	1.83 m (6 ft 0 in)	68 kg (150 lb)	305 cm (120 in)	283 cm (111 in)	(Belgium) Asterix Kieldrecht
12	Hanne Coppens	7 May 1998	1.84 m (6 ft 0 in)	70 kg (150 lb)	303 cm (119 in)	288 cm (113 in)	(Belgium) TSV Vilvoorde
14	Anna Valkenborg	4 January 1998	1.74 m (5 ft 9 in)	58 kg (128 lb)	290 cm (110 in)	270 cm (110 in)	(Belgium) TSV Vilvoorde
16	Lotte De Quick	11 January 1998	1.72 m (5 ft 8 in)	53 kg (117 lb)	283 cm (111 in)	260 cm (100 in)	(Belgium) TSV Vilvoorde
17	Justine D'hondt	8 July 1999	1.77 m (5 ft 10 in)	60 kg (130 lb)	298 cm (117 in)	267 cm (105 in)	(Belgium) TSV Vilvoorde

=== Argentina ===
The following is the Argentinean roster in the 2015 FIVB Volleyball Girls' U18 World Championship.

Head Coach: Mauro Silvestre

No.	Name	Date of birth	Height	Weight	Spike	Block	2015 club
1	Valentina Gonzalez	23 February 1998	1.63 m (5 ft 4 in)	56 kg (123 lb)	271 cm (107 in)	260 cm (100 in)	(Argentina) 9 De Julio - Freyre
2	Candelaria Herrera	28 January 1999	1.82 m (6 ft 0 in)	71 kg (157 lb)	290 cm (110 in)	275 cm (108 in)	(Argentina) Universidad De San Juan
7	Azul Benítez (C)	5 February 1998	1.67 m (5 ft 6 in)	57 kg (126 lb)	272 cm (107 in)	263 cm (104 in)	(Argentina) Mar Chiquita
9	Anahi Tosi	10 July 1998	1.81 m (5 ft 11 in)	60 kg (130 lb)	290 cm (110 in)	272 cm (107 in)	(Argentina) 9 De Julio - Freyre
10	Candela Nota	1 March 1999	1.82 m (6 ft 0 in)	60 kg (130 lb)	280 cm (110 in)	271 cm (107 in)	(Argentina) Union San Guillermo
11	Maria Corbalan	7 November 1998	1.75 m (5 ft 9 in)	60 kg (130 lb)	283 cm (111 in)	275 cm (108 in)	(Argentina) Fundarte
12	Agostina Soria	9 October 1998	1.79 m (5 ft 10 in)	65 kg (143 lb)	279 cm (110 in)	271 cm (107 in)	(Argentina) Vélez Sársfield
13	Sabrina Germanier	7 June 1999	1.75 m (5 ft 9 in)	65 kg (143 lb)	276 cm (109 in)	269 cm (106 in)	(Argentina) Social Y Dep. San Jose
14	Agostina Beltramino	25 April 1999	1.80 m (5 ft 11 in)	65 kg (143 lb)	283 cm (111 in)	283 cm (111 in)	(Argentina) Provincial - Rosario
15	Daniela Nielson	19 February 1998	1.69 m (5 ft 7 in)	57 kg (126 lb)	278 cm (109 in)	266 cm (105 in)	(Argentina) Universidad De San Juan
16	Victoria Michel Tosi	1 July 1999	1.82 m (6 ft 0 in)	69 kg (152 lb)	283 cm (111 in)	273 cm (107 in)	(Argentina) Echague-Parana
18	Ariana Macies	12 March 1998	1.80 m (5 ft 11 in)	56 kg (123 lb)	277 cm (109 in)	263 cm (104 in)	(Argentina) Villa Dora

=== Dominican Republic ===
The following is the Dominican roster in the 2015 FIVB Volleyball Girls' U18 World Championship.

Head Coach: Alexandre Ceccato

No.	Name	Date of birth	Height	Weight	Spike	Block	2015 club
2	Madeline Guillen	4 June 2001	1.86 m (6 ft 1 in)	74 kg (163 lb)	273 cm (107 in)	242 cm (95 in)	(Dominican Republic) Malanga
4	Vielka Peralta	13 April 1999	1.76 m (5 ft 9 in)	56 kg (123 lb)	275 cm (108 in)	242 cm (95 in)	(Dominican Republic) Deportivo Nacional
5	Pamela Jorge	26 November 1998	1.68 m (5 ft 6 in)	65 kg (143 lb)	296 cm (117 in)	240 cm (94 in)	(Dominican Republic) Deportivo Nacional
6	Yemari Reyes	23 August 1998	1.60 m (5 ft 3 in)	68 kg (150 lb)	240 cm (94 in)	234 cm (92 in)	(Dominican Republic) Deportivo Nacional
8	Natalia Martínez	25 November 2000	1.86 m (6 ft 1 in)	71 kg (157 lb)	300 cm (120 in)	275 cm (108 in)	(Dominican Republic) Mirador
11	Gerleny Mercedes	16 January 1998	1.76 m (5 ft 9 in)	68 kg (150 lb)	268 cm (106 in)	238 cm (94 in)	(Dominican Republic) Club Deportivo Tesoro
12	Hennesys Lalane	10 April 2000	1.85 m (6 ft 1 in)	74 kg (163 lb)	270 cm (110 in)	238 cm (94 in)	(Dominican Republic) Deportivo Nacional
13	Massiel Matos	16 April 1998	1.84 m (6 ft 0 in)	66 kg (146 lb)	300 cm (120 in)	292 cm (115 in)	(Dominican Republic) Higuey
14	Yokaty Pérez (C)	6 August 1998	1.78 m (5 ft 10 in)	79 kg (174 lb)	291 cm (115 in)	257 cm (101 in)	(Dominican Republic) Los Cachorros
15	Gabriela Hernández	16 January 1998	1.86 m (6 ft 1 in)	66 kg (146 lb)	272 cm (107 in)	240 cm (94 in)	(Dominican Republic) Deportivo Nacional
16	Geraldine González	18 April 2002	1.93 m (6 ft 4 in)	71 kg (157 lb)	273 cm (107 in)	245 cm (96 in)	(Dominican Republic) Deportivo Nacional
19	Lisbeth Rosario	26 May 1999	1.80 m (5 ft 11 in)	73 kg (161 lb)	273 cm (107 in)	265 cm (104 in)	(Dominican Republic) Deportivo Nacional

== Pool D ==
=== Italy ===
The following is the Italian roster in the 2015 FIVB Volleyball Girls' U18 World Championship.

Head Coach: Marco Mencarelli

No.	Name	Date of birth	Height	Weight	Spike	Block	2015 club
1	Roberta Carraro	17 November 1998	1.81 m (5 ft 11 in)	68 kg (150 lb)	290 cm (110 in)	282 cm (111 in)	(Italy) AGS San Donà
5	Marina Lubian	11 April 2000	1.87 m (6 ft 2 in)	67 kg (148 lb)	304 cm (120 in)	288 cm (113 in)	(Italy) Lilliput Settimo Torinese
6	Giorgia Zannoni	11 February 1998	1.75 m (5 ft 9 in)	68 kg (150 lb)	284 cm (112 in)	270 cm (110 in)	(Italy) Club Italia
7	Alexandra Botezat	3 August 1998	1.97 m (6 ft 6 in)	75 kg (165 lb)	316 cm (124 in)	304 cm (120 in)	(Italy) Club Italia
8	Claudia Provaroni	14 May 1998	1.77 m (5 ft 10 in)	72 kg (159 lb)	298 cm (117 in)	282 cm (111 in)	(Italy) Volleyrò
10	Alice Pamio	15 January 1998	1.79 m (5 ft 10 in)	66 kg (146 lb)	302 cm (119 in)	278 cm (109 in)	(Italy) Volleyrò
11	Giulia Mancini	23 May 1998	1.83 m (6 ft 0 in)	68 kg (150 lb)	302 cm (119 in)	282 cm (111 in)	(Italy) Volleyrò
12	Alessia Mazzaro	19 September 1998	1.84 m (6 ft 0 in)	64 kg (141 lb)	302 cm (119 in)	284 cm (112 in)	(Italy) Vero Volley Monza
13	Giulia Melli	8 January 1998	1.84 m (6 ft 0 in)	70 kg (150 lb)	304 cm (120 in)	282 cm (111 in)	(Italy) Volleyrò
14	Paola Egonu	18 December 1998	1.93 m (6 ft 4 in)	78 kg (172 lb)	332 cm (131 in)	312 cm (123 in)	(Italy) Club Italia
19	Vittoria Piani (C)	12 February 1998	1.87 m (6 ft 2 in)	76 kg (168 lb)	316 cm (124 in)	296 cm (117 in)	(Italy) Club Italia
20	Alessia Orro	18 July 1998	1.83 m (6 ft 0 in)	74 kg (163 lb)	276 cm (109 in)	260 cm (100 in)	(Italy) Club Italia

=== Turkey ===
The following is the Turkish roster in the 2015 FIVB Volleyball Girls' U18 World Championship.

Head Coach: Mehmet Nuri Bedestenloglu

No.	Name	Date of birth	Height	Weight	Spike	Block	2015 club
1	Melisa Memis	27 January 1998	1.69 m (5 ft 7 in)	65 kg (143 lb)	270 cm (110 in)	265 cm (104 in)	(Turkey) Arma Yaşam
4	Gizem Misra Asçi	26 January 1998	1.78 m (5 ft 10 in)	65 kg (143 lb)	250 cm (98 in)	220 cm (87 in)	(Turkey) Eczacıbaşı
6	Saliha Şahin	2 February 1998	1.85 m (6 ft 1 in)	62 kg (137 lb)	282 cm (111 in)	275 cm (108 in)	(Turkey) Karayollari
7	Buket Gülübay	28 February 1999	1.83 m (6 ft 0 in)	68 kg (150 lb)	298 cm (117 in)	281 cm (111 in)	(Turkey) Vakıfbank
8	Yasemin Güveli	5 January 1999	1.87 m (6 ft 2 in)	68 kg (150 lb)	300 cm (120 in)	285 cm (112 in)	(Turkey) Eczacıbaşı
10	Selmin Karahan (C)	20 July 1998	1.80 m (5 ft 11 in)	70 kg (150 lb)	286 cm (113 in)	285 cm (112 in)	(Turkey) Eczacıbaşı
11	Ezgi Akyaldiz	25 May 1998	1.83 m (6 ft 0 in)	69 kg (152 lb)	290 cm (110 in)	285 cm (112 in)	(Turkey) Karşıyaka
14	Çağla Erdem	18 June 1998	1.86 m (6 ft 1 in)	74 kg (163 lb)	295 cm (116 in)	285 cm (112 in)	(Turkey) Yeşilyurt
16	Yasemin Özel	13 May 1998	1.84 m (6 ft 0 in)	76 kg (168 lb)	285 cm (112 in)	282 cm (111 in)	(Turkey) Karşıyaka
17	Tutku Burcu Yüzgenç	15 January 1999	1.88 m (6 ft 2 in)	61 kg (134 lb)	298 cm (117 in)	295 cm (116 in)	(Turkey) Vakıfbank
18	Zehra Güneş	7 July 1999	1.97 m (6 ft 6 in)	82 kg (181 lb)	309 cm (122 in)	292 cm (115 in)	(Turkey) Vakıfbank
20	Buse Melis Kara	30 August 1998	1.77 m (5 ft 10 in)	75 kg (165 lb)	286 cm (113 in)	271 cm (107 in)	(Turkey) Eczacıbaşı

=== Brazil ===
The following is the Brazilian roster in the 2015 FIVB Volleyball Girls' U18 World Championship.

Head Coach: Luizomar de Moura

No.	Name	Date of birth	Height	Weight	Spike	Block	2015 club
2	Diana Duarte	22 February 1999	1.94 m (6 ft 4 in)	69 kg (152 lb)	297 cm (117 in)	287 cm (113 in)	(Brazil) Barueri
3	Jackeline Moreno	30 December 1999	1.74 m (5 ft 9 in)	67 kg (148 lb)	286 cm (113 in)	271 cm (107 in)	(Brazil) Barueri
5	Cassia Rauber	2 May 1998	1.83 m (6 ft 0 in)	62 kg (137 lb)	285 cm (112 in)	272 cm (107 in)	(Brazil) Saudade
8	Amanda Sehn (C)	16 July 1998	1.80 m (5 ft 11 in)	64 kg (141 lb)	280 cm (110 in)	270 cm (110 in)	(Brazil) Estrela
9	Lorrayna Da Silva	19 June 1999	1.85 m (6 ft 1 in)	62 kg (137 lb)	306 cm (120 in)	286 cm (113 in)	(Brazil) Taubaté Vôlei
10	Beatriz Carvalho	18 December 1998	1.80 m (5 ft 11 in)	67 kg (148 lb)	292 cm (115 in)	276 cm (109 in)	(Brazil) Regina Mundi
11	Eduarda Cavatão	28 September 1998	1.92 m (6 ft 4 in)	90 kg (200 lb)	298 cm (117 in)	287 cm (113 in)	(Brazil) Sesi-SP
12	Karina Souza	30 November 1998	1.82 m (6 ft 0 in)	65 kg (143 lb)	294 cm (116 in)	276 cm (109 in)	(Brazil) Pinheiros
13	Ana Beatriz Franklin	19 January 1998	1.82 m (6 ft 0 in)	67 kg (148 lb)	286 cm (113 in)	272 cm (107 in)	(Brazil) Pinheiros
14	Giovana Viezel	21 July 1999	1.90 m (6 ft 3 in)	76 kg (168 lb)	309 cm (122 in)	290 cm (110 in)	(Brazil) São José
17	Gabriella Da Silva	10 March 1999	1.63 m (5 ft 4 in)	60 kg (130 lb)	296 cm (117 in)	254 cm (100 in)	(Brazil) Fluminense
20	Nyeme Costa	11 October 1998	1.75 m (5 ft 9 in)	79 kg (174 lb)	297 cm (117 in)	280 cm (110 in)	(Brazil) Bradesco

=== Japan ===
The following is the Japanese roster in the 2015 FIVB Volleyball Girls' U18 World Championship.

Head Coach: Daichi Saegusa

No.	Name	Date of birth	Height	Weight	Spike	Block	2015 club
2	Manami Mandai (C)	17 May 1998	1.69 m (5 ft 7 in)	58 kg (128 lb)	282 cm (111 in)	270 cm (110 in)	(Japan) Shujitsu HS
3	Ai Kurogo	14 June 1998	1.80 m (5 ft 11 in)	70 kg (150 lb)	302 cm (119 in)	290 cm (110 in)	(Japan) Shimokitazawa Seitoku H.S.
6	Kanoha Kagamihara	30 July 1998	1.60 m (5 ft 3 in)	62 kg (137 lb)	262 cm (103 in)	250 cm (98 in)	(Japan) Higashi-Kyusyu Ryukoku HS
7	Shuri Yamaguchi	2 September 1998	1.75 m (5 ft 9 in)	69 kg (152 lb)	292 cm (115 in)	280 cm (110 in)	(Japan) Shimokitazawa Seitoku HS
8	Shiori Aratani	22 September 1998	1.73 m (5 ft 8 in)	60 kg (130 lb)	295 cm (116 in)	290 cm (110 in)	(Japan) Kyoei Gakuen Senior HS
9	Miku Shimada	11 October 1998	1.74 m (5 ft 9 in)	62 kg (137 lb)	290 cm (110 in)	285 cm (112 in)	(Japan) Kinrankai HS
10	Miyuki Horie	12 October 1998	1.73 m (5 ft 8 in)	62 kg (137 lb)	293 cm (115 in)	280 cm (110 in)	(Japan) Shimokitazawa Seitoku HS
12	Haruka Sekiyama	21 December 1998	1.75 m (5 ft 9 in)	73 kg (161 lb)	292 cm (115 in)	284 cm (112 in)	(Japan) Hachioji Jissen HS
13	Nanami Seki	12 June 1999	1.71 m (5 ft 7 in)	58 kg (128 lb)	282 cm (111 in)	275 cm (108 in)	(Japan) Kashiwai HS
15	Ruriko Uesaka	7 September 1999	1.73 m (5 ft 8 in)	65 kg (143 lb)	287 cm (113 in)	280 cm (110 in)	(Japan) Fukui Senior HS
17	Kotona Hayashi	13 November 1999	1.71 m (5 ft 7 in)	56 kg (123 lb)	280 cm (110 in)	270 cm (110 in)	(Japan) Kinrankai HS
18	Miyu Nakagawa	8 January 2000	1.79 m (5 ft 10 in)	65 kg (143 lb)	293 cm (115 in)	280 cm (110 in)	(Japan) Higashi-Kyusyu Ryukoku HS

=== Cuba ===
The following is the Cuban roster in the 2015 FIVB Volleyball Girls' U18 World Championship.

Head Coach: Tomas Fernandez

No.	Name	Date of birth	Height	Weight	Spike	Block	2015 club
1	Dalila Palma	18 November 1999	1.82 m (6 ft 0 in)	62 kg (137 lb)	301 cm (119 in)	285 cm (112 in)	(Cuba) Cienfuegos
3	Elizabet Vicet	9 August 2000	1.73 m (5 ft 8 in)	63 kg (139 lb)	293 cm (115 in)	284 cm (112 in)	(Cuba) Matanzas
5	Maria Martinez	1 February 1999	1.82 m (6 ft 0 in)	70 kg (150 lb)	301 cm (119 in)	289 cm (114 in)	(Cuba) Pinar Del Río
7	Aidachi Aguero	19 March 1999	1.77 m (5 ft 10 in)	69 kg (152 lb)	304 cm (120 in)	295 cm (116 in)	(Cuba) Camaguey
8	Diaris Perez (C)	16 November 1998	1.82 m (6 ft 0 in)	75 kg (165 lb)	304 cm (120 in)	295 cm (116 in)	(Cuba) Havana
10	Kitania Medina	24 February 1999	1.86 m (6 ft 1 in)	77 kg (170 lb)	308 cm (121 in)	295 cm (116 in)	(Cuba) Havana
12	Ailama Cese	29 October 2000	1.88 m (6 ft 2 in)	58 kg (128 lb)	322 cm (127 in)	308 cm (121 in)	(Cuba) Mayabeque
13	Liset Herrera	6 December 1998	1.92 m (6 ft 4 in)	70 kg (150 lb)	311 cm (122 in)	300 cm (120 in)	(Cuba) Matanzas
14	Anaila Martinez	20 March 1999	1.84 m (6 ft 0 in)	70 kg (150 lb)	320 cm (130 in)	310 cm (120 in)	(Cuba) Villa Clara
15	Carmela Massip	17 January 1998	1.81 m (5 ft 11 in)	65 kg (143 lb)	304 cm (120 in)	295 cm (116 in)	(Cuba) Sancti Spiritus
16	Jessica Aguilera	25 May 1999	1.84 m (6 ft 0 in)	68 kg (150 lb)	311 cm (122 in)	302 cm (119 in)	(Cuba) Havana

== See also ==
- 2015 FIVB Volleyball Boys' U19 World Championship squads
