= 2023–24 CEV Women's Challenge Cup =

Volleyball club tournament

CEV Women's Challenge Cup
- 2023–24

Tournament information
- Sport: Volleyball
- Dates: October 2023–February 2024
- Teams: 51
- Website: Women's Challenge Cup

Final positions
- Champions: (Italy) Igor Gorgonzola Novara (2nd title)
- Runner-up: (France) Neptunes Nantes

The 2023–24 CEV Women's Challenge Cup was the 44th edition of the European Challenge Cup volleyball club tournament.

Igor Gorgonzola Novara won their second title after beating Neptunes Nantes in the final.

== Format ==
Qualification round (Home and away matches):

- 32nd finals

Main phase (Home and away matches):

- 16th finals → 8th finals → Quarter-finals

Final phase (Home and away matches):

- Semi-finals → Finals

Aggregate score is counted as follows: 3 points for 3–0 or 3–1 win, 2 points for 3–2 win, 1 point for 2–3 loss.
In case the teams are tied after two legs, a Golden Set is played immediately at the completion of the second leg.

== Qualified teams ==
(Austria) Kelag Wildcats Klagenfurt	(Austria) Oberbank Steelvolleys Linz/Steg	(Austria) TI-Volley Innbruck	(Austria) UVC Holding Graz
(Azerbaijan) Azerrail Baku	(Belgium) E.S. Charleroi Volley	(Belgium) Bevo Rekkenshop Roeselare	(Bosnia and Herzegovina) Bimal Jedinstvo Brčko
(Bulgaria) Levski Sofia	(Croatia) Dinamo Zagreb	(Croatia) Marina Kastela	(Croatia) Ribola Kastela
(Cyprus) Olympiada Neapolis Nicosia	(Czech Republic) VK Prostějov	(Czech Republic) PKV Olymp Praha	(Denmark) Holte IF
(Faroe Islands) SÍ Sørvágur	(Finland) Hämeenlinnan LR	(Finland) Pölkky Kuusamo	(France) Neptunes Nantes
(Germany) VC Wiesbaden	(Greece) AC PAOK Thessaloniki	(Greece) AEK Athens	(Greece) ASP Thetis Voula
(Greece) Panathinaikos AC Athens	(Greece) Olympiacos SFP Piraeus	(Hungary) Fatum-Nyíregyháza	(Italy) VBC TrasportiP Casalmaggiore
(Israel) Maccabi Haifa VC	(Latvia) Rigas VB Skola/Universitāte	(Lithuania) TK Kaunas VDU	(Netherlands) Djopzz Zwolle
(Netherlands) Friso Sneek	(Netherlands) Sliedrecht Sport	(North Macedonia) Rabotnicki Skopje	(Norway) Randaberg IL
(Poland) BKS Bostik Bielsko-Biała	(Portugal) Sporting CP Lisboa	(Portugal) Kairos Ponta Delgada	(Romania) CSM București
(Romania) CSM Lugoj	(Romania) CSO Voluntari 2005	(Serbia) Crvena Zvezda Beograd	(Serbia) ŽOK UB
(Serbia) Tent Obrenovac	(Slovakia) Hit UCM Trnava	(Slovakia) VK Pirane Brusno	(Slovenia) GEN-I Volley Nova Gorica
(Spain) Avarca de Menorca	(Spain) FPPRO Voley Andalucia	(Switzerland) Sm' Aesch	(Switzerland) Kanti Schaffhausen
(Turkey) Bursa Nilüfer Belediye	(Ukraine) SC Balta	(Turkey) Galatasaray Daikin (Note: Galatasaray Daikin qualified after winning the BVA Cup)	(Italy) Igor Gorgonzola Novara (Note: Igor Gorgonzola Novara qualified after winning the WEVZA Cup)

== Draw ==
The draw was held in Luxembourg on the 19 July 2023.

== 32nd finals ==
Team 1	Agg.	Team 2	1st leg	2nd leg	Golden Set
Bye	–	(Lithuania) TK Kaunas VDU	–	–	
Bye	–	(Greece) Olympiacos SFP Piraeus	–	–	
Bye	–	(Norway) Randaberg IL	–	–	
Igor Gorgonzola Novara (Italy)	6–0	(Italy) VBC TrasportiP Casalmaggiore	3–0	3–0	
Bye	–	(Israel) Maccabi Haifa VC	–	–	
Kelag Wildcats Klagenfurt (Austria)	2–4	(Serbia) ŽOK UB	3–2	0–3	
Bye	–	(Switzerland) Kanti Schaffhausen	–	–	
AEK Athens (Greece)	1–5	(Romania) CSO Voluntari 2005	2–3	0–3	
Bye	–	(Bulgaria) Levski Sofia	–	–	
Ribola Kastela (Croatia)	0–6	(Croatia) Dinamo Zagreb	0–3	0–3	
AC PAOK Thessaloniki (Greece)	5–1	(Cyprus) Olympiada Neapolis Nicosia	3–1	3–2	
Bye	–	(Czech Republic) VK Prostějov	–	–	
Bye	–	(Finland) Hämeenlinnan LR	–	–	
Galatasaray Daikin (Turkey)	6–0	(Portugal) Kairos Ponta Delgada	3–0	3–0	
Sliedrecht Sport (Netherlands)	1–5	(Belgium) Bevo Rekkenshop Roeselare	0–3	2–3	
Bye	–	(Germany) VC Wiesbaden	–	–	
Panathinaikos AC Athens (Greece)	6–0	(Netherlands) Djopzz Zwolle	3–1	3–1	
Bye	–	(Slovenia) GEN-I Volley Nova Gorica	–	–	
Bye	–	(Romania) CSM București	–	–	
FPPRO Voley Andalucia (Spain)	3–3	(Hungary) Fatum-Nyíregyháza	3–1	0–3	12–15
Azerrail Baku (Azerbaijan)	6–0	(Ukraine) SC Balta	3–0	3–0	
UVC Holding Graz (Austria)	0–6	(Spain) Avarca de Menorca	0–3	0–3	
Friso Sneek (Netherlands)	0–6	(Czech Republic) PKV Olymp Praha	0–3	1–3	
Pölkky Kuusamo (Finland)	0–6	(France) Neptunes Nantes	1–3	0–3	
Sporting CP Lisboa (Portugal)	6–0	(Denmark) Holte IF	3–0	3–1	
Tent Obrenovac (Serbia)	5–1	(Belgium) E.S. Charleroi Volley	3–0	3–2	
CSM Lugoj (Romania)	6–0	(North Macedonia) Rabotnicki Skopje	3–0	3–0	
Bye	–	(Switzerland) Sm' Aesch	–	–	
Oberbank Steelvolleys Linz/Steg (Austria)	6–0	(Slovakia) Hit UCM Trnava	3–0	3–0	
VK Pirane Brusno (Slovakia)	0–6	(Austria) TI-Volley Innbruck	0–3	0–3	
Bye	–	(Croatia) Marina Kastela	–	–	
ASP Thetis Voula (Greece)	1–5	(Turkey) Bursa Nilüfer Belediye	2–3	0–3	

=== Matches ===
Date	Time		Score		Set 1	Set 2	Set 3	Set 4	Set 5	Total	Report
First Leg
10 Oct	18:30	Rabotnicki Skopje (North Macedonia)	0–3	(Romania) CSM Lugoj	18–25	15–25	17–25			50–75	Report
10 Oct	20:00	Galatasaray Daikin (Turkey)	3–0	(Portugal) Kairos Ponta Delgada	25–17	25–11	25–20			75–48	Report
10 Oct	20:00	PKV Olymp Praha (Czech Republic)	3–0	(Netherlands) Friso Sneek	25–14	25–16	25–20			75–50	Report
11 Oct	17:00	Panathinaikos AC Athens (Greece)	3–1	(Netherlands) Djopzz Zwolle	28–26	21–25	25–18	25–16		99–85	Report
11 Oct	18:00	Ribola Kastela (Croatia)	0–3	(Croatia) Dinamo Zagreb	23–25	24–26	17–25			64–76	Report
11 Oct	18:00	AC PAOK Thessaloniki (Greece)	3–1	(Cyprus) Olympiada Neapolis Nicosia	25–21	16–25	25–16	25–23		91–85	Report
11 Oct	18:00	VK Pirane Brusno (Slovakia)	0–3	(Austria) TI-Volley Innbruck	20–25	24–26	13–25			57–76	Report
11 Oct	18:00	ASP Thetis Voula (Greece)	2–3	(Turkey) Bursa Nilüfer Belediye	25–21	15–25	27–25	13–25	9–15	89–111	Report
11 Oct	18:30	AEK (Greece)	2–3	(Romania) CSO Voluntari 2005	29–27	26–24	19–25	21–25	12–15	107–116	Report
11 Oct	18:30	Pölkky Kuusamo (Finland)	1–3	(France) Neptunes Nantes	16–25	25–22	14–25	17–25		72–97	Report
11 Oct	19:00	Kelag Wildcats Klagenfurt (Austria)	3–2	(Serbia) ŽOK UB	21–25	16–25	25–15	25–19	16–14	103–98	Report
11 Oct	19:30	Sporting CP Lisboa (Portugal)	3–0	(Denmark) Holte IF	25–16	27–25	25–21			77–62	Report
11 Oct	19:00	Oberbank Steelvolleys Linz/Steg (Austria)	3–0	(Slovakia) Hit UCM Trnava	25–17	25–18	25–19			75–54	Report
11 Oct	19:00	Tent Obrenovac (Serbia)	3–0	(Belgium) E.S. Charleroi Volley	25–16	25–20	25–22			75–58	Report
11 Oct	19:30	Sliedrecht Sport (Netherlands)	0–3	(Belgium) Bevo Rekkenshop Roeselare	15–25	17–25	16–25			48–75	Report
11 Oct	19:30	FPPRO Voley Andalucia (Spain)	3–1	(Hungary) Fatum-Nyíregyháza	25–15	19–25	25–15	25–22		94–77	Report
12 Oct	19:00	UVC Holding Graz (Austria)	0–3	(Spain) Avarca de Menorca	16–25	16–25	23–25			55–75	Report
12 Oct	20:00	Igor Gorgonzola Novara (Italy)	3–0	(Italy) VBC TrasportiP Casalmaggiore	25–21	25–22	25–16			75–59	Report
17 Oct	20:00	Azerrail Baku (Azerbaijan)	3–0	(Ukraine) SC Balta	25–18	25–18	25–18			75–54	Report
Second Leg
11 Oct	18:30	CSM Lugoj (Romania)	3–0	(North Macedonia) Rabotnicki Skopje	25–8	25–15	25–10			75–33	Report
11 Oct	20:00	Friso Sneek (Netherlands)	1–3	(Czech Republic) PKV Olymp Praha	18–25	28–26	18–25	21–25		85–101	Report
12 Oct	18:00	Bursa Nilüfer Belediye (Turkey)	3–0	(Greece) ASP Thetis Voula	25–22	25–21	25–19			75–62	Report
17 Oct	17:00	Hit UCM Trnava (Slovakia)	0–3	(Austria) Oberbank Steelvolleys Linz/Steg	14–25	18–25	14–25			46–75	Report
17 Oct	19:00	Holte IF (Denmark)	1–3	(Portugal) Sporting CP Lisboa	25–16	11–25	15–25	22–25		73–91	Report
17 Oct	20:00	Olympiada Neapolis Nicosia (Cyprus)	2–3	(Greece) AC PAOK Thessaloniki	25–20	25–23	16–25	22–25	13–15	101–108	Report
17 Oct	20:00	Neptunes Nantes (France)	3–0	(Finland) Pölkky Kuusamo	25–12	25–14	25–18			75–44	Report
17 Oct	20:00	Avarca de Menorca (Spain)	3–0	(Austria) UVC Holding Graz	31–29	25–16	25–22			81–67	Report
17 Oct	20:30	Bevo Rekkenshop Roeselare (Belgium)	3–2	(Netherlands) Sliedrecht Sport	23–25	28–30	25–22	25–20	15–11	116–108	Report
18 Oct	17:00	CSO Voluntari 2005 (Romania)	3–0	(Greece) AEK	25–21	25–20	25–18			75–59	Report
18 Oct	18:00	Fatum-Nyíregyháza (Hungary)	3–0	(Spain) FPPRO Voley Andalucia	25–22	25–23	25–22			75–67	Report
18 Oct	19:00	ŽOK UB (Serbia)	3–0	(Austria) Kelag Wildcats Klagenfurt	25–15	25–21	25–17			75–53	Report
18 Oct	19:00	TI-Volley Innbruck (Austria)	3–0	(Slovakia) VK Pirane Brusno	25–8	25–14	25–8			75–30	Report
18 Oct	20:00	SC Balta (Ukraine)	0–3	(Azerbaijan) Azerrail Baku	23–25	15–25	19–25			57–75	Report
18 Oct	20:00	Djopzz Zwolle (Netherlands)	1–3	(Greece) Panathinaikos AC Athens	24–26	23–25	25–21	18–25		90–97	Report
18 Oct	20:00	Dinamo Zagreb (Croatia)	3–0	(Croatia) Ribola Kastela	25–12	25–16	25–19			75–47	Report
18 Oct	20:30	Kairos Ponta Delgada (Portugal)	0–3	(Turkey) Galatasaray Daikin	19–25	18–25	17–25			54–75	Report
18 Oct	20:30	E.S. Charleroi Volley (Belgium)	2–3	(Serbia) Tent Obrenovac	13–25	31–29	20–25	25–17	11–15	100–111	Report
19 Oct	20:30	VBC TrasportiP Casalmaggiore (Italy)	0–3	(Italy) Igor Gorgonzola Novara	15–25	18–25	23–25			56–75	Report

== 16th finals ==
Team 1	Agg.	Team 2	1st leg	2nd leg	Golden Set
TK Kaunas (Lithuania)	0–6	(Greece) Olympiacos SFP	0–3	0–3	
Maccabi Haifa VC (Israel)	0–6	(Serbia) ŽOK UB	w/o	w/o	
CSM București (Romania)	6–0	(Hungary) Fatum-Nyíregyháza	3–1	3–0	
Marina Kastela (Croatia)	0–6	(Turkey) Bursa Nilüfer Belediye	0–3	0–3	
CSM Lugoj (Romania)	4–2	(Switzerland) Sm' Aesch	3–0	2–3	
Randaberg IL (Norway)	0–6	(Italy) Igor Gorgonzola Novara	0–3	0–3	
Levski Sofia (Bulgaria)	0–6	(Croatia) Dinamo Zagreb	0–3	0–3	
Hämeenlinnan LR (Finland)	0–6	(Turkey) Galatasaray Daikin	0–3	0–3	
Kanti Schaffhausen (Switzerland)	0–6	(Romania) CSO Voluntari 2005	0–3	1–3	
PKV Olymp Praha (Czech Republic)	0–6	(France) Neptunes Nantes	0–3	0–3	
Panathinaikos AC Athens (Greece)	6–0	(Slovenia) GEN-I Volley Nova Gorica	3–0	3–0	
Bevo Rekkenshop Roeselare (Belgium)	0–6	(Germany) VC Wiesbaden	1–3	0–3	
AC PAOK Thessaloniki (Greece)	6–0	(Czech Republic) VK Prostějov	3–0	3–1	
Azerrail Baku (Azerbaijan)	3–3	(Spain) Avarca de Menorca	3–1	0–3	11–15
Sporting CP Lisboa (Portugal)	0–6	(Serbia) Tent Obrenovac	1–3	0–3	
Oberbank Steelvolleys Linz/Steg (Austria)	3–3	(Austria) TI-Volley Innbruck	3–1	1–3	15–12

=== Matches ===
Date	Time		Score		Set 1	Set 2	Set 3	Set 4	Set 5	Total	Report
First Leg
7 Nov	19:00	TK Kaunas VDU (Lithuania)	0–3	(Greece) Olympiacos SFP Piraeus	18–25	21–25	18–25			57–75	Report
7 Nov	19:00	Maccabi Haifa VC (Israel)	0–3	(Serbia) ŽOK UB	–	–	–			0–0	Report
8 Nov	17:00	Panathinaikos AC Athens (Greece)	3–0	(Slovenia) GEN-I Volley Nova Gorica	25–19	25–18	25–18			75–55	Report
8 Nov	18:00	AC PAOK Thessaloniki (Greece)	3–0	(Czech Republic) VK Prostějov	25–19	27–25	25–19			77–63	Report
8 Nov	18:00	CSM București (Romania)	3–1	(Hungary) Fatum-Nyíregyháza	25–20	25–18	17–25	25–18		92–81	Report
8 Nov	18:00	PKV Olymp Praha (Czech Republic)	0–3	(France) Neptunes Nantes	20–25	21–25	21–25			62–75	Report
8 Nov	18:00	Marina Kastela (Croatia)	0–3	(Turkey) Bursa Nilüfer Belediye	15–25	18–25	11–25			44–75	Report
8 Nov	18:30	CSM Lugoj (Romania)	3–0	(Switzerland) Sm' Aesch	25–12	25–11	25–20			75–43	Report
8 Nov	18.30	Oberbank Steelvolleys Linz/Steg (Austria)	3–1	(Austria) TI-Volley Innbruck	27–25	25–20	24–26	25–18		101–89	Report
8 Nov	19.00	Randaberg IL (Norway)	0–3	(Italy) Igor Gorgonzola Novara	16–25	16–25	16–25			48–75	Report
8 Nov	19:00	Levski Sofia (Bulgaria)	0–3	(Croatia) Dinamo Zagreb	20–25	19–25	21–25			60–75	Report
8 Nov	20:00	Bevo Rekkenshop Roeselare (Belgium)	1–3	(Germany) VC Wiesbaden	22–25	25–15	23–25	16–25		86–90	Report
9 Nov	18:00	Sporting CP Lisboa (Portugal)	1–3	(Serbia) Tent Obrenovac	22–25	16–25	25–16	16–25		79–91	Report
9 Nov	18:30	Hämeenlinnan LR (Finland)	0–3	(Turkey) Galatasaray Daikin	14–25	18–25	13–25			45–75	Report
9 Nov	19:00	Azerrail Baku (Azerbaijan)	3–1	(Spain) Avarca de Menorca	23–25	25–15	25–19	25–23		98–82	Report
9 Nov	20:00	Kanti Schaffhausen (Switzerland)	0–3	(Romania) CSO Voluntari 2005	19–25	14–25	21–25			54–75	Report
Second Leg
14 Nov	19:30	Sm' Aesch (Switzerland)	3–2	(Romania) CSM Lugoj	12–25	18–25	25–19	25–14	15–14	95–97	Report
14 Nov	20:00	Neptunes Nantes (France)	3–0	(Czech Republic) PKV Olymp Praha	25–23	25–19	25–13			75–55	Report
15 Nov	17:00	CSO Voluntari 2005 (Romania)	3–1	(Switzerland) Kanti Schaffhausen	25–22	20–25	25–22	25–22		95–91	Report
15 Nov	18:00	GEN-I Volley Nova Gorica (Slovenia)	0–3	(Greece) Panathinaikos AC Athens	20–25	18–25	25–27			63–77	Report
15 Nov	18:00	Fatum-Nyíregyháza (Hungary)	0–3	(Romania) CSM București	17–25	11–25	18–25			46–75	Report
15 Nov	18:00	Bursa Nilüfer Belediye (Turkey)	3–0	(Croatia) Marina Kastela	25–16	25–15	25–15			75–46	Report
15 Nov	19:00	Olympiacos SFP Piraeus (Greece)	3–0	(Lithuania) TK Kaunas VDU	25–10	25–7	25–13			75–30	Report
15 Nov	19:00	Tent Obrenovac (Serbia)	3–0	(Portugal) Sporting CP Lisboa	25–16	25–12	25–23			75–51	Report
15 Nov	19:00	TI-Volley Innbruck (Austria)	3–1	(Austria) Oberbank Steelvolleys Linz/Steg	25–16	25–9	16–25	25–19		91–69	Report
15 Nov	19:30	VC Wiesbaden (Germany)	3–0	(Belgium) Bevo Rekkenshop Roeselare	25–21	25–19	25–14			75–54	Report
15 Nov	20:00	Igor Gorgonzola Novara (Italy)	3–0	(Norway) Randaberg IL	25–15	25–15	25–12			75–42	Report
15 Nov	20:00	Avarca de Menorca (Spain)	3–0	(Azerbaijan) Azerrail Baku	25–20	25–23	25–17			75–60	Report
16 Nov	18:00	VK Prostějov (Czech Republic)	1–3	(Greece) AC PAOK Thessaloniki	22–25	25–21	22–25	17–25		86–96	Report
16 Nov	20:00	Dinamo Zagreb (Croatia)	3–0	(Bulgaria) Levski Sofia	25–21	25–8	25–20			75–49	Report
16 Nov	20:00	Galatasaray Daikin (Turkey)	3–0	(Finland) Hämeenlinnan LR	25–14	25–15	25–14			75–43	Report
		ŽOK UB (Serbia)	3–0	(Israel) Maccabi Haifa VC	–	–	–			0–0	

== 8th finals ==
Team 1	Agg.	Team 2	1st leg	2nd leg	Golden Set
ŽOK UB (Serbia)	0–6	(Romania) CSO Voluntari 2005	1–3	0–3	
Olympiacos SFP (Greece)	1–5	(Italy) Igor Gorgonzola Novara	2–3	0–3	
Dinamo Zagreb (Croatia)	3–3	(Greece) AC PAOK Thessaloniki	0–3	3–0	6–15
Panathinaikos AC Athens (Greece)	3–3	(Romania) CSM București	3–1	0–3	15–12
Avarca de Menorca (Spain)	0–6	(France) Neptunes Nantes	0–3	1–3	
Galatasaray Daikin (Turkey)	3–3	(Germany) VC Wiesbaden	2–3	3–2	11–15
Tent Obrenovac (Serbia)	0–6	(Romania) CSM Lugoj	0–3	0–3	
Oberbank Steelvolleys Linz/Steg (Austria)	1–5	(Turkey) Bursa Nilüfer Belediye	2–3	0–3	

=== Matches ===
Date	Time		Score		Set 1	Set 2	Set 3	Set 4	Set 5	Total	Report
First Leg
28 Nov	18:00	Olympiacos SFP Piraeus (Greece)	2–3	(Italy) Igor Gorgonzola Novara	20–25	25–23	23–25	25–22	6–15	99–110	Report
28 Nov	19:00	ŽOK UB (Serbia)	1–3	(Romania) CSO Voluntari 2005	14–25	25–22	24–26	20–25		83–98	Report
28 Nov	19:00	Oberbank Steelvolleys Linz/Steg (Austria)	2–3	(Turkey) Bursa Nilüfer Belediye	35–33	18–25	13–25	25–22	11–15	102–120	Report
29 Nov	17:00	Panathinaikos AC Athens (Greece)	3–1	(Romania) CSM București	25–21	25–21	23–25	25–19		98–86	Report
29 Nov	20:00	Avarca de Menorca (Spain)	0–3	(France) Neptunes Nantes	16–25	26–28	13–25			55–78	Report
29 Nov	20:30	Dinamo Zagreb (Croatia)	0–3	(Greece) AC PAOK Thessaloniki	22–25	21–25	23–25			66–75	Report
30 Nov	19:00	Tent Obrenovac (Serbia)	0–3	(Romania) CSM Lugoj	27–29	17–25	24–26			68–80	Report
30 Nov	20:30	Galatasaray Daikin (Turkey)	2–3	(Germany) VC Wiesbaden	22–25	16–25	27–25	25–21	13–15	103–111	Report
Second Leg
5 Dec	18:00	AC PAOK Thessaloniki (Greece)	0–3	(Croatia) Dinamo Zagreb	19–25	19–25	19–25			57–75	Report
5 Dec	18:00	CSM București (Romania)	3–0	(Greece) Panathinaikos AC Athens	25–24	25–21	25–23			75–68	Report
5 Dec	20:00	Neptunes Nantes (France)	3–1	(Spain) Avarca de Menorca	25–17	25–17	17–25	25–23		92–82	Report
6 Dec	17:00	CSO Voluntari 2005 (Romania)	3–0	(Serbia) ŽOK UB	25–17	25–22	25–22			75–61	Report
6 Dec	18:00	Bursa Nilüfer Belediye (Turkey)	3–0	(Austria) Oberbank Steelvolleys Linz/Steg	25–17	25–18	25–19			75–54	Report
6 Dec	18:30	CSM Lugoj (Romania)	3–0	(Serbia) Tent Obrenovac	25–19	25–13	25–22			75–54	Report
6 Dec	19:30	VC Wiesbaden (Germany)	2–3	(Turkey) Galatasaray Daikin	20–25	25–22	25–21	18–25	14–16	102–109	Report
6 Dec	20:00	Igor Gorgonzola Novara (Italy)	3–0	(Greece) Olympiacos SFP Piraeus	25–13	25–19	29–27			79–59	Report

== Quarter-finals ==
Team 1	Agg.	Team 2	1st leg	2nd leg
Igor Gorgonzola Novara (Italy)	6–0	(Romania) CSO Voluntari 2005	3–1	3–0
AC PAOK Thessaloniki (Greece)	0–6	(Germany) VC Wiesbaden	0–3	0–3
Panathinaikos AC Athens (Greece)	0–6	(France) Neptunes Nantes	1–3	1–3
CSM Lugoj (Romania)	0–6	(Turkey) Bursa Nilüfer Belediye	1–3	0–3

=== Matches ===
Date	Time		Score		Set 1	Set 2	Set 3	Set 4	Set 5	Total	Report
First Leg
9 Jan	20:00	Igor Gorgonzola Novara (Italy)	3–1	(Romania) CSO Voluntari 2005	25–18	19–25	25–13	25–17		94–73	Report
10 Jan	18:30	CSM Lugoj (Romania)	1–3	(Turkey) Nilüfer Belediyespor	24–26	25–22	25–27	15–25		89–100	Report
10 Jan	23:59	Panathinaikos AC Athens (Greece)	1–3	(France) Neptunes Nantes	21–25	27–25	21–25	21–25		90–100	Report
11 Jan	19:00	AC PAOK Thessaloniki (Greece)	0–3	(Germany) VC Wiesbaden	18–25	22–25	14–25			54–75	Report
Second Leg
16 Jan	20:00	Neptunes Nantes (France)	3–1	(Greece) Panathinaikos AC Athens	25–27	25–23	25–21	25–14		100–85	Report
17 Jan	17:00	CSO Voluntari 2005 (Romania)	0–3	(Italy) Igor Gorgonzola Novara	17–25	18–25	20–25			55–75	Report
17 Jan	19:30	VC Wiesbaden (Germany)	3–0	(Greece) AC PAOK Thessaloniki	25–23	25–22	25–22			75–67	Report
18 Jan	18:00	Nilüfer Belediyespor (Turkey)	3–0	(Romania) CSM Lugoj	25–22	25–20	25–11			75–53	Report

== Semi-finals ==
Team 1	Agg.	Team 2	1st leg	2nd leg
Igor Gorgonzola Novara (Italy)	6–0	(Germany) VC Wiesbaden	3–1	3–1
Neptunes Nantes (France)	6–0	(Turkey) Bursa Nilüfer Belediye	3–0	3–0

=== Matches ===
Date	Time		Score		Set 1	Set 2	Set 3	Set 4	Set 5	Total	Report
First Leg
30 Jan	20:00	Neptunes Nantes (France)	3–0	(Turkey) Nilüfer Belediyespor	25–16	25–19	25–17			75–52	Report
1 Feb	20:00	Igor Gorgonzola Novara (Italy)	3–1	(Germany) VC Wiesbaden	21–25	30–28	25–17	25–23		101–93	Report
Second Leg
7 Feb	18:00	Nilüfer Belediyespor (Turkey)	0–3	(France) Neptunes Nantes	18–25	18–25	16–25			52–75	Report
7 Feb	19:30	VC Wiesbaden (Germany)	1–3	(Italy) Igor Gorgonzola Novara	23–25	25–22	21–25	21–25		90–97	Report

== Finals ==
Team 1	Agg.	Team 2	1st leg	2nd leg
Igor Gorgonzola Novara (Italy)	6–0	(France) Neptunes Nantes	3–0	3–1

=== Matches ===
Date	Time		Score		Set 1	Set 2	Set 3	Set 4	Set 5	Total	Report
First Leg
21 Feb	20:00	Igor Gorgonzola Novara (Italy)	3–0	(France) Neptunes Nantes	26–24	25–22	25–20			76–66	Report
Second Leg
28 Feb	20:00	Neptunes Nantes (France)	1–3	(Italy) Igor Gorgonzola Novara	25–23	16–25	20–25	19–25		80–98	Report

== See also ==
- 2023–24 CEV Champions League
- 2023–24 CEV Cup
- 2023–24 CEV Challenge Cup
- 2023–24 CEV Women's Champions League
- 2023–24 Women's CEV Cup
