= Slađana Erić =

Serbian volleyball player (born 1983)

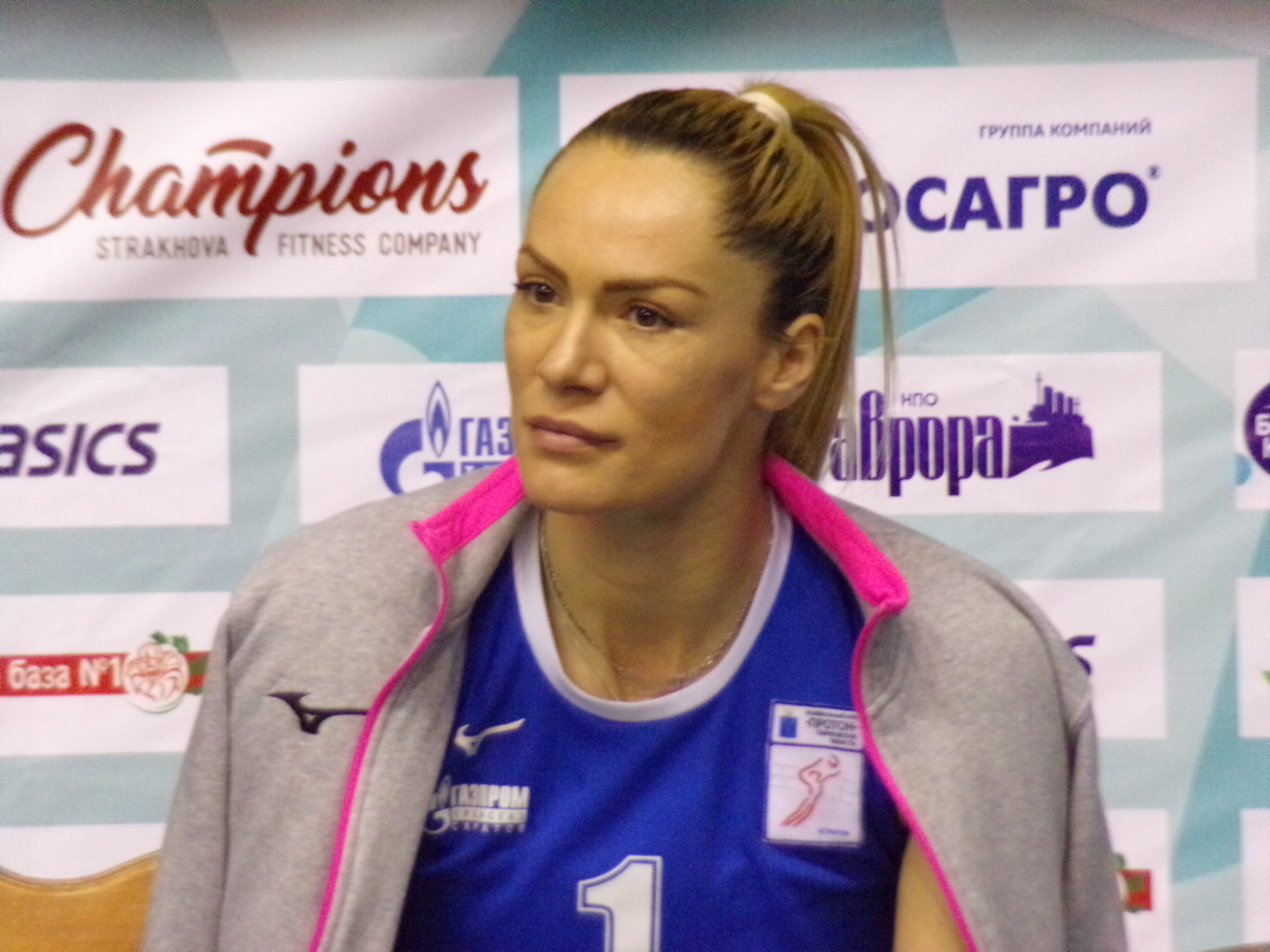

Personal information
- Full name: Slađana Erić
- Born: 29 July 1983; Tuzla, Yugoslavia
- Height: 1.83 m (6 ft 0 in)

Volleyball information
- Position: Middle Blocker
- Current club: ŽOK UB
- Number: 1

Career
Years	Teams
2000–2004; 2004–2005; 2005–2008; 2008–2010; 2010–2011; 2011; 2011–2012; 2012–2013; 2013–present	Red Star Belgrade; USSP Albi; VBC Volero Zurich; CAV Murcia 2005; Red Star Belgrade; Universal Modena; Galatasaray Medical Park; OK Kolubara; ŽOK Partizan Vizura

National team
2002–2005	Serbia women's national volleyball team

Slađana Erić (born 29 July 1983) is a Serbian volleyball player. She plays for ŽOK Partizan Vizura.

== Clubs ==
- OK Crvena Zvezda (Serbia) 2000–2004
- USSP Albi (France) 2004–2005
- VBC Voléro Zurich (Switzerland) 2005–2008
- CAV Murcia 2005 (Spain) 2008–2010
- OK Crvena Zvezda (Serbia) 2010–2011
- Universal Modena (Italy) 2011
- Galatasaray Medical Park (Turkey) 2011–2012
- OK Kolubara (Serbia) 2012–2013
- ŽOK Partizan Vizura (Serbia) 2013–2018
- Liu Jo Nordmeccanica Modena (Italy) 2018

== Awards ==
- Championship of Serbia
  - Winner: 2002, 2003, 2004. (OK Crvena Zvezda), 2014. (ŽOK Partizan Vizura)
- Serbian Cup
  - Winner: 2002. (OK Crvena Zvezda)
- Serbian Super Cup
  - Winner: 2013. (ŽOK Partizan Vizura)
- Switzerland Super CUP
  - Winner: 2006. (VBC Voléro Zurich)
- Championship of Switzerland
  - Winner: 2006, 2007, 2008. (VBC Voléro Zurich)
- Switzerland Cup
  - Winner: 2006, 2007, 2008. (VBC Voléro Zurich)
- Championship of Spain
  - Winner: 2009. (CAV Murcia 2005)
- Spanish Cup
  - Winner: 2009, 2010. (CAV Murcia 2005)
- Spanish Super Cup
  - Winner: 2009. (CAV Murcia 2005)
- Women's CEV Cup
  - Runner–up: 2012. (Galatasaray Medical Park)
