= Tijana Malešević =

Serbian volleyball player

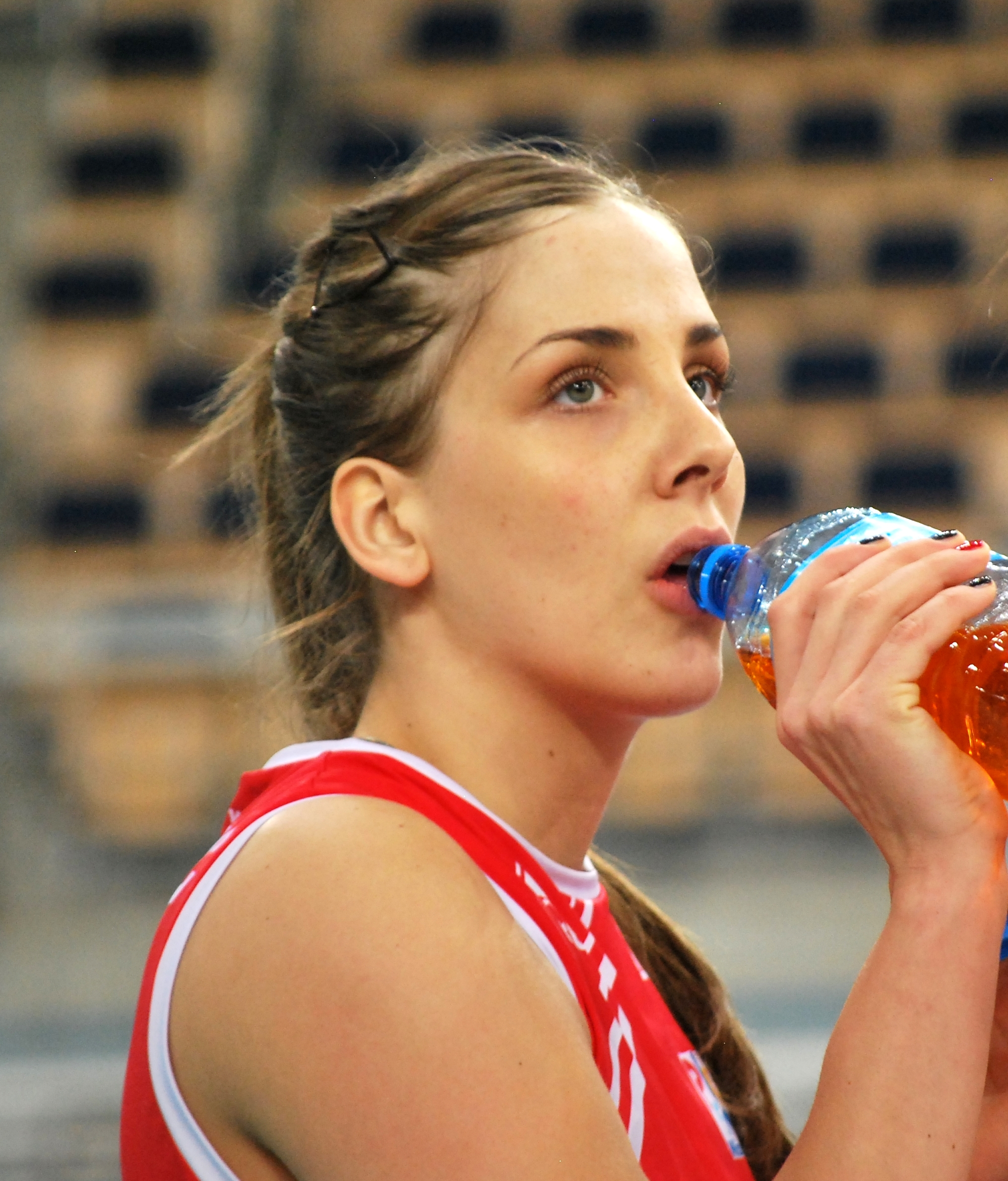
- Malešević in October 2012

Personal information
- Nationality: Serbian
- Born: 18 March 1991 (age 35) Titovo Užice, SR Serbia, SFR Yugoslavia
- Height: 1.85 m (6 ft 1 in)
- Weight: 78 kg (172 lb)
- Spike: 300 cm (118 in)
- Block: 286 cm (113 in)

Volleyball information
- Position: Wing spiker
- Current club: OK Crvena zvezda
- Number: 15

Career
- Years: Team
- 2005–2010: OK Jedinstvo Užice
- 2010–2012: Voléro Zürich
- 2012–2013: PTPS Piła
- 2013–2014: VK Prostějov
- 2014–2015: Sarıyer Belediyespor
- 2015–2016: AGIL Volley Novara
- 2016–2017: Vôlei Nestlé Osasco
- 2017–2018: Seramiksan Spor Kulübü
- 2018: CSM Volei Alba Blaj
- 2018–2019: OK Crvena zvezda
- 2019: Il Bisonte Firenze
- 2019: OK Crvena zvezda

National team
- Years: Team
- 2009-2018: Serbia
Honours
Volleyball
Olympic Games
Silver medal – second place	2016 Rio de Janeiro	Team
World Championship
Gold medal – first place	2018 Japan	Team
European Championship
Gold medal – first place	2011 Serbia/Italy
Gold medal – first place	2017 Azerbaijan/Georgia
Bronze medal – third place	2015 Netherlands/Belgium
World Cup
Silver medal – second place	2015 Japan
FIVB World Grand Prix
Bronze medal – third place	2011 Macau
Bronze medal – third place	2013 Sapporo
Bronze medal – third place	2017 Nanjing
European Games
Bronze medal – third place	2015 Baku	Team
European League
Gold medal – first place	2009 Kayseri
Gold medal – first place	2011 Istanbul
Bronze medal – third place	2012 Karlovy Vary

Tijana Malešević (Serbian Cyrillic: Тијана Малешевић; born 18 March 1991) is a Serbian volleyball player, who plays for OK Crvena zvezda, and was a member of the Serbia women's national volleyball team that won the gold medal at the 2011 European Championship in Serbia and Italy and 2017 Women's European Volleyball Championship in Azerbaijan and Georgia, and gold medal at the 2018 FIVB Volleyball Women's World Championship held in Japan.

She signed with the Turkish club Sarıyer Belediyespor for the 2014–15 season. On 18 December 2018 Tijana signed with Serbian powerhouse OK Crvena zvezda. On 25 January 2019 Tijana signed contract for second part of the 2018-19 season with Serie A1 member, Il Bisonte Firenze. At the start of the 2019/20 season, Tijana returned to Belgrade and OK Crvena zvezda. She is the sister of Serbian basketball player Nikola Malešević.

== Awards ==
=== Clubs ===
- 2016/17 Brazilian Superliga - Runner up, with Vôlei Nestlé
- 2017/18 CEV Champions League - Runner-Up, with CSM Volei Alba Blaj
