= OK Jedinstvo Užice =

- 2017–18
- Full name: Odbojkaški Klub Jedinstvo Užice
- Founded: 1969
- Ground: Veliki Park, Užice (Capacity: 2,200)
- Chairman: Milovan Bošković
- Head coach: Dragoljub Janić
- League: Prva Liga
- 2016–17: 11th in Super Liga (relegated to Prva Liga)

Uniforms
Home	Away

OK Jedinstvo Užice is a Serbian women's volleyball club based in Užice which currently plays in the Prva League (second highest professional league in Serbia). It has won the Serbian League and Cup on multiple occasions.

== Previous names ==
Due to sponsorship, the club have competed under the following names:

- Jedinstvo Užice (1968–1993)
- Jedinstvo Kuridža Užice (1993–1994)
- Jedinstvo Luna Užice (1994–1996)
- Jedinstvo Užice (1996–present)

== History ==
The club was established in Yugoslavia in 1969 and had its most successful period after the dissolution of Yugoslavia in the early 1990s, dominating the first decade of the new league created in 1992 for clubs in Serbia and Montenegro. During the period from 1992 to 2005, the club won the Serbian league nine times (including eight consecutive titles from 1994 to 2001) and the Serbian Cup eight times (five consecutive titles from 1996 to 2000).

Between 1997 and 2007, the club also played in European competitions, including five editions of the Champions Cup/League and four editions of the Top Teams/CEV Cup, reaching the final of the 2001–02 Top Teams Cup.

The club plays its home matches at the Veliki Park hall in Užice.

== Honours ==
=== National competitions ===
- Serbian League (FR Yugoslavia, Serbia & Montenegro): 9

1993–94, 1994–95, 1995–96, 1996–97, 1997–98, 1998–99, 1999–00, 2000–01, 2004–05

- Serbian Cup (FR Yugoslavia, Serbia & Montenegro): 8

1993, 1994, 1996, 1997, 1998, 1999, 2000, 2003

== Team ==
Season 2017–2018, as of December 2017.

Number	Player	Position	Height (m)	Weight (kg)	Birth date
1	(Serbia) Danica Popović	Opposite	1.79		1 January 1999 (age 27)
2	(Serbia) Anđela Nenadić	Middle blocker	1.78		27 June 1999 (age 26)
4	(Serbia) Sara Vojnić-Purčar	Outside hitter	1.87		16 January 1996 (age 30)
5	(Serbia) Katarina Dumanjić	Opposite	1.76		3 March 1999 (age 27)
7	(Serbia) Katarina Glišović	Outside hitter	1.77		18 March 1998 (age 28)
10	(Serbia) Marija Borčić	Setter	1.78		24 October 1999 (age 26)
12	(Serbia) Marija Tomašević	Middle blocker	1.80		8 December 1999 (age 26)
16	(Serbia) Andrea Kovačević	Outside hitter	1.79		19 July 1999 (age 26)
17	(Serbia) Kristina Stanković	Libero	1.70		29 October 1999 (age 26)
18	(Serbia) Anđela Jovanović	Opposite	1.81		5 April 2001 (age 25)
20	(Serbia) Marija Bogdanović	Middle blocker	1.75		1 January 2000 (age 26)

2016–2017 Team
Number	Player	Position	Height (m)	Birth date
2	(Serbia) Anđela Nenadić	Middle blocker	1.78	1999
3	(Serbia) Dubravka Kraković	Middle blocker	1.80	1998
4	(Serbia) Sara Vojnić-Purčar	Spiker	1.87	1996
5	(Serbia) Katarina Dumanjić	Opposite	1.76	1999
6	(Serbia) Tamara Dejanović	Libero	1.65	1998
7	(Serbia) Katarina Glišović	Spiker	1.77	1998
8	(Serbia) Bojana Stojković	Spiker	1.84	1985
9	(Serbia) Anica Kutlešić	Middle blocker	1.85	1996
10	(Serbia) Marija Borčić	Setter	1.78	1999
11	(Serbia) Aleksandra Brđović	Setter	1.77	1997
12	(Serbia) Marija Tomašević	Spiker	1.80	1999
13	(Serbia) Jelica Jovančićević	Middle blocker	1.84	1995
14	(Serbia) Milica Tošić	Opposite	1.89	1999
15	(Serbia) Milica Todorović	Libero	1.74	1990
16	(Serbia) Andrea Kovačević	Spiker	1.79	1999
17	(Serbia) Jelena Ristivojević	Middle blocker	1.89	1989
18	(Serbia) Anđela Jovanović	Opposite	1.81	2001
19	(Serbia) Ivana Vojinović	Opposite	1.84	1989
Coach: (Serbia) Dragoljub Janić

== Notable players ==
- (Serbia) Mira Golubović
- (Serbia) Vesna Čitaković
- (Serbia) Suzana Ćebić
- (Serbia) Ana Antonijević
- (Serbia) Jasna Majstorović
- (Serbia) Nataša Krsmanović
- (Serbia) Jovana Vesović
- (Serbia) Sanja Starović
- (Serbia) Tijana Malešević
- (Serbia) Vesna Tomašević
- (Serbia) Aleksandra Avramović
- (Serbia) Brankica Stevanović
- (Serbia) Ivana Ostojić
- (Serbia) Jelena Kostić
- (Serbia) Katarina Dimitrijević
- (Serbia) Svetlana Ilić
- (Serbia) Gordana Bošković
- (Serbia) Aleksandra Milosavljević
