= Marta Drpa =

Serbian professional volleyball player

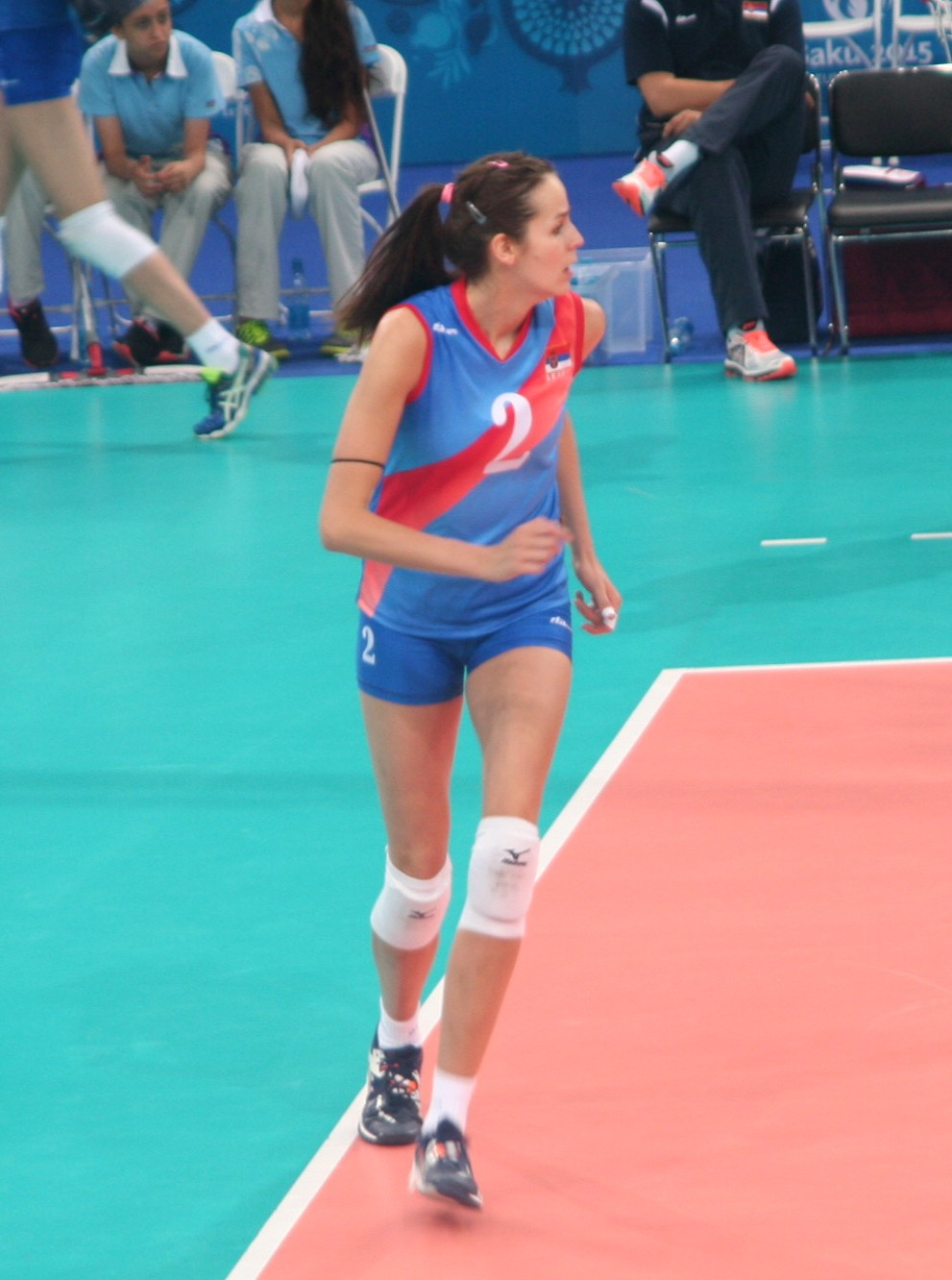
- Drpa at the 2018 PSL Grand Prix Conference

Personal information
- Nationality: Serbian
- Born: 20 April 1989 (age 37); Knin, SR Croatia, SFR Yugoslavia
- Hometown: Belgrade, Serbia
- Height: 1.92 m (6 ft 4 in)
- Weight: 75 kg (165 lb)
- Spike: 315 cm (124 in)
- Block: 305 cm (120 in)

Volleyball information
- Position: Opposite Hitter
- Current club: PAOK
- Number: 21

Career
Years	Teams
2005–2009; 2009–2010; 2013–2014; 2014–2015; 2015; 2015; 2016–2018; 2018; 2018–2019; 2019–2020; 2020–2023; 2023; 2023–2024; 2024–	Crvena Zvezda Beograd; Voléro Zürich; Železničar Lajkovac; NIS Spartak Subotica; Obiettivo Risarcimento; CSM Târgoviște; SC Potsdam; Cocolife Asset Managers; SC Potsdam; Yenisey Krasnoyarsk; Békéscsabai RSE; Maccabi Haifa; SK Prometey; PAOK

National team
2006–	Serbia
Honours
Women's volleyball
Representing Serbia
European Games
Bronze medal – third place	2015 Baku	Team
U20 World Championship
Silver medal – second place	2005 Ankara/Istanbul	Team
European Championship
Bronze medal – third place	2015 Netherlands/Belgium	Team

Marta Drpa (Serbian Cyrillic: Марта Дрпа; born 20 April 1989) is a Serbian professional volleyball player. She was a member of the Serbia women's national volleyball team that won the bronze medals at the 2015 European Games and 2015 European Championship. She also won the championships at the 2010 National League A in Switzerland and 2016 Cupa României in Romania with Voléro Zürich and CSM Târgoviște respectively. Her current club is PAOK.

== Career ==
=== National team ===
Drpa is a member of the Serbia women's national volleyball team since 2006. Her main accomplishments as a junior player were awarded in 2005 and 2007 when Serbia won 2nd place in both World Championship and University Games.

She was part of the squad that won the bronze medals at the 2015 European Games held in Azerbaijan and 2015 European Championship held in Belgium and the Netherlands. She also took part at the 2015 FIVB Volleyball World Grand Prix that happened in the United States. Their team finished at 8th place after the tournament.

She was part of 25 national selections in total.

=== Serbian clubs ===
Drpa's professional volleyball career debuted in 2005 when she was just 16 years old. From 2005 to 2009, she was a member of Crvena Zvezda Beograd, a club that plays in the Volleyball League of Serbia, the highest level of women's volleyball league in the country. Her most notable achievement with the club is when they won the bronze medal at the 2007–2008 CEV Cup.

She left Serbia after her season with the Red Star Belgrade. In 2013, she went back and joined Železničar Lajkovac. She played with the club for a year then transferred to NIS Spartak Subotica for the 2014 to 2015 season. The club won the silver medal in the Volleyball League of Serbia.

In December 2014, she was awarded as the MVP in the Wiener Städtische Liga.

=== Other countries ===
Drpa started playing outside Serbia in 2009. She joined Voléro Zürich, a club that plays in the National League A, the highest volleyball league in Switzerland. She led the team to its 5th championship title.

In 2015, she went to Italy to join Obiettivo Risarcimento, a club that plays in the Serie A1, the highest level club competition in the country. She stayed with the team for a season.

In the same year, she went to Romania to reinforce CSM Târgoviște, a club that plays in the country's top professional volleyball league, Divizia A1. The club won the 2015–2016 championship in the Romanian Women's Volleyball Cup.

In 2016, she moved to Germany to join SC Potsdam, a volleyball club that plays in the Bundesliga. The team ranked at 4th place in the 2016–2017 season and finished at 7th place after the 2017–2018 championship.

In 2018, she went to the Philippines to join the Cocolife Asset Managers, a club that plays in the Philippine Super Liga. The club finished at 4th place at the 2018 PSL Grand Prix Conference.

Drpa played again in the Bundesliga in Germany for the 2018/2019 season. Her club, SC Potsdam, finished at 4th place.

In 2019, she joined Yenisey Krasnoyarsk, a Russian volleyball club that plays in the Super League and European Cup.

== Personal life ==
Drpa was born in Knin, SR Croatia, SFR Yugoslavia to ethnic Serb parents. In 1995, she became a refugee in FR Yugoslavia after exodus of Serbs during Operation Storm.

== Clubs ==
- (Serbia) Crvena Zvezda Beograd (2005–2009)
- (Switzerland) Voléro Zürich (2009–2010)
- (Serbia) Železničar Lajkovac (2013–2014)
- (Serbia) NIS Spartak Subotica (2014–2015)
- (Italy) Obiettivo Risarcimento (2015)
- (Romania) CSM Târgoviște (2015)
- (Germany) SC Potsdam (2016–2018)
- (Philippines) Cocolife Asset Managers (2018)
- (Germany) SC Potsdam (2018–2019)
- (Russia) Yenisey Krasnoyarsk (2019–2020)
- (Hungary) Békéscsabai RSE (2020–2023)

== Awards ==
=== Individuals ===
- 2015 Wiener Städtische Liga "Most Valuable Player"

=== National team ===
==== Junior ====
- 2005 U20 World Championship - (silver) Silver Medal
- 2007 Summer Universiade - (silver) Silver Medal

==== Senior ====
- 2015 European Games – (bronze) Bronze Medal
- 2015 European Championship – (bronze) Bronze Medal

=== Clubs ===
- 2007 Volleyball League of Serbia – Third, with Crvena Zvezda Beograd
- 2007–2008 Women's CEV Cup – Third, with Crvena Zvezda Beograd
- 2008 Volleyball League of Serbia – Runner-up, with Crvena Zvezda Beograd
- 2009 Volleyball League of Serbia – Runner-up, with Crvena Zvezda Beograd
- 2010 Swiss National League A – Champion, with Voléro Zürich
- 2010 Swiss Cup – Champion, with Voléro Zürich
- 2015 Volleyball League of Serbia – Runner-up, with NIS Spartak Subotica
- 2016 Romanian Cup – Champion, with CSM Târgoviște
