= ŽOK Železničar =

Serbian women's volleyball club

ŽOK Železničar Lajkovac
- Full name: Ženski odbojkaški klub Železničar Lajkovac
- Founded: 8 June 2008
- Ground: Sports Hall Lajkovac (Capacity: 824)
- League: Serbian Women's SuperLiga
- Website: zokzeleznicar.rs

ŽOK Železničar Lajkovac (Serbian: ЖОК Железничар Лајковац) is a Serbian women's volleyball club based in Lajkovac, Serbia. For the 2024–25 season, the club competes in the Serbian Women's SuperLiga, the highest professional level of women's volleyball in the country.

== History ==
The club was founded on 8 June 2008 on the initiative of Živorad "Žika" Lazarević. ŽOK Železničar quickly progressed through the Serbian volleyball system and, since the 2012–13 season, has competed in the top-tier SuperLiga.

The club plays its home matches at the Lajkovac Sports Hall with a capacity of 824 seats.

== Honours ==
=== National competitions ===
- Serbian Championship: 2

2018–19, 2024–25

- Serbian Cup: 3

2017–18, 2018–19, 2020–21
Finalists (2): 2021–22, 2024–25

- Serbian Super Cup: 2

2019, 2021
Finalists (3): 2018, 2022, 2025

== Famous players ==
- (Serbia) Ana Antonijević
- (Serbia) Ana Bjelica
- (Serbia) Marta Drpa
- (Serbia) Aleksandra Uzelac
- (Serbia) Vanja Ivanović
