= ŽOK Jedinstvo =

ŽOK Jedinstvo Stara Pazova
- Full name: Ženski odbojkaški klub Jedinstvo Stara Pazova
- Ground: HS Stara Pazova (Capacity: 300)
- League: Serbian Women's SuperLiga

ŽOK Jedinstvo Stara Pazova (Serbian: ЖОК Јединство Стара Пазова) is a Serbian women's volleyball club based in Stara Pazova. The team competes in the Serbian Women's SuperLiga and is one of the most successful clubs in recent Serbian volleyball, winning multiple national trophies across league, cup, and super cup competitions.

== Honours ==
=== International competitions ===
- Challenge Cup
  - Semi-finalists (1): 2022–23
- BVA Cup
  - Runners-up (1): 2021–22

=== National competitions ===
- Serbian SuperLiga
  - Winners (2): 2023–24, 2022–23
  - Runners-up (4): 2019–20, 2018–19, 2016–17, 2015–16
- Serbian Prva Liga
  - Runners-up (1): 2011–12
- Serbian Cup
  - Winners (2): 2023–24, 2016–17
  - Runners-up (3): 2022–23, 2019–20, 2015–16
- Serbian SuperCup
  - Winners (2): 2023–24, 2016–17
  - Runners-up (2): 2024–25, 2017–18
