= Serbian Women's Volleyball League =

Women's volleyball competition

Superliga
- Sport: Volleyball
- Founded: 2007
- First season: 2007
- Administrator: OSSRB
- No. of teams: 10 (2019–20)
- Country: Serbia
- Continent: Europe
- Most recent champion: ŽOK Železničar (1st title)
- Most titles: OK Vizura (5 titles)
- Level on pyramid: 1
- Relegation to: 2nd League
- Domestic cups: Serbian Cup; Serbian Super Cup
- International cups: CEV Champions League; CEV Cup; CEV Challenge Cup
- Website: http://ossrb-web.dataproject.com/

The Serbian Women's Volleyball League is a women's volleyball competition organized by the Volleyball Federation of Serbia (Одбојкашки савез Србије).

== History ==
The Serbian Women's Volleyball League was created in 2006/07 Season after the dissolution of the former First League of Serbia and Montenegro several teams from around Serbia has participated as of 2025/26 Season the League have 12 teams participating.

== List of Champions ==
=== Including titles in Serbia and Montenegro ===
- 1992: Crvena zvezda
- 1993: Crvena zvezda
- 1994: Jedinstvo Užice
- 1995: Jedinstvo Užice
- 1996: Jedinstvo Užice
- 1997: Jedinstvo Užice
- 1998: Jedinstvo Užice
- 1999: Jedinstvo Užice
- 2000: Jedinstvo Užice
- 2001: Jedinstvo Užice
- 2002: Crvena zvezda
- 2003: Crvena zvezda
- 2004: Crvena zvezda
- 2005: Jedinstvo Užice
- 2006: Poštar

=== Serbian Superliga (2006–) ===
Years	(gold) Champions	(silver) Runners-up	(bronze) Third Place / Semi-finalists
2007	Poštar 064 Belgrade	OK Jedinstvo Užice	OK Crvena Zvezda Belgrade
2008	Poštar 064 Belgrade	OK Crvena Zvezda Belgrade	ŽOK Dinamo Pančevo
2009	Poštar 064 Belgrade	OK Crvena Zvezda Belgrade	ŽOK Dinamo Pančevo
2010	OK Crvena Zvezda Belgrade	ŽOK Spartak Subotica	OK TENT
2011	OK Crvena Zvezda Belgrade	OK Vizura	OK TENT / ŽOK Dinamo Pančevo
2012	OK Crvena Zvezda Belgrade	ŽOK Spartak Subotica	OK Vizura / OK Varadin
2013	OK Crvena Zvezda Belgrade	ŽOK Spartak Subotica	OK Vizura / OK Jedinstvo Užice
2014	OK Partizan Vizura	OK Crvena Zvezda Belgrade	OK TENT / ŽOK Jedinstvo Stara Pazova
2015	OK Vizura	ŽOK Spartak Subotica	OK Crvena Zvezda Belgrade / ŽOK Jedinstvo Stara Pazova
2016	OK Vizura	ŽOK Jedinstvo Stara Pazova	ŽOK Spartak Subotica / ŽOK Železničar Lajkovac
2017	OK Vizura	ŽOK Jedinstvo Stara Pazova	OK TENT / OK Crvena Zvezda Belgrade
2018	OK Vizura	OK Crvena Zvezda Belgrade	ŽOK Železničar Lajkovac / ŽOK Jedinstvo Stara Pazova
2019	ŽOK Železničar Lajkovac	ŽOK Jedinstvo Stara Pazova	OK Crvena Zvezda Belgrade / OK Vizura
2020	OK TENT	ŽOK Jedinstvo Stara Pazova	ŽOK Ub
2021	ŽOK Ub	OK TENT	ŽOK Jedinstvo Stara Pazova / ŽOK Partizan
2022	OK Crvena Zvezda Belgrade	ŽOK Ub	ŽOK Jedinstvo Stara Pazova / ŽOK Železničar Lajkovac
2023	ŽOK Jedinstvo Stara Pazova	ŽOK Ub	OK Crvena Zvezda Belgrade / ŽOK Železničar Lajkovac
2024	ŽOK Jedinstvo Stara Pazova	OK TENT	OK Crvena Zvezda Belgrade / ŽOK Železničar Lajkovac
2025	ŽOK Železničar Lajkovac	ŽOK Ub	OK Crvena Zvezda Belgrade / OK TENT
2026	OK TENT	ŽOK Ub	ŽOK Železničar Lajkovac / ŽOK Jedinstvo Stara Pazova

== Table by club ==
rk.	Club	Titles	City	Years Won
1	OK Vizura	5	Belgrade	2014, 2015, 2016, 2017, 2018
2	OK Crvena Zvezda	5	Belgrade	2010, 2011, 2012, 2013, 2022
3	Poštar 064 Belgrade	3	Belgrade	2007, 2008, 2009
4	ŽOK Jedinstvo Stara Pazova	2	Stara Pazova	2023, 2024
5	ŽOK Železničar	2	Lajkovac	2019, 2025
6	OK TENT	2	Obrenovac	2020, 2026
7	ŽOK Ub	1	Ub	2021
