= Olga Raonić =

Serbian volleyball player (born 1986)

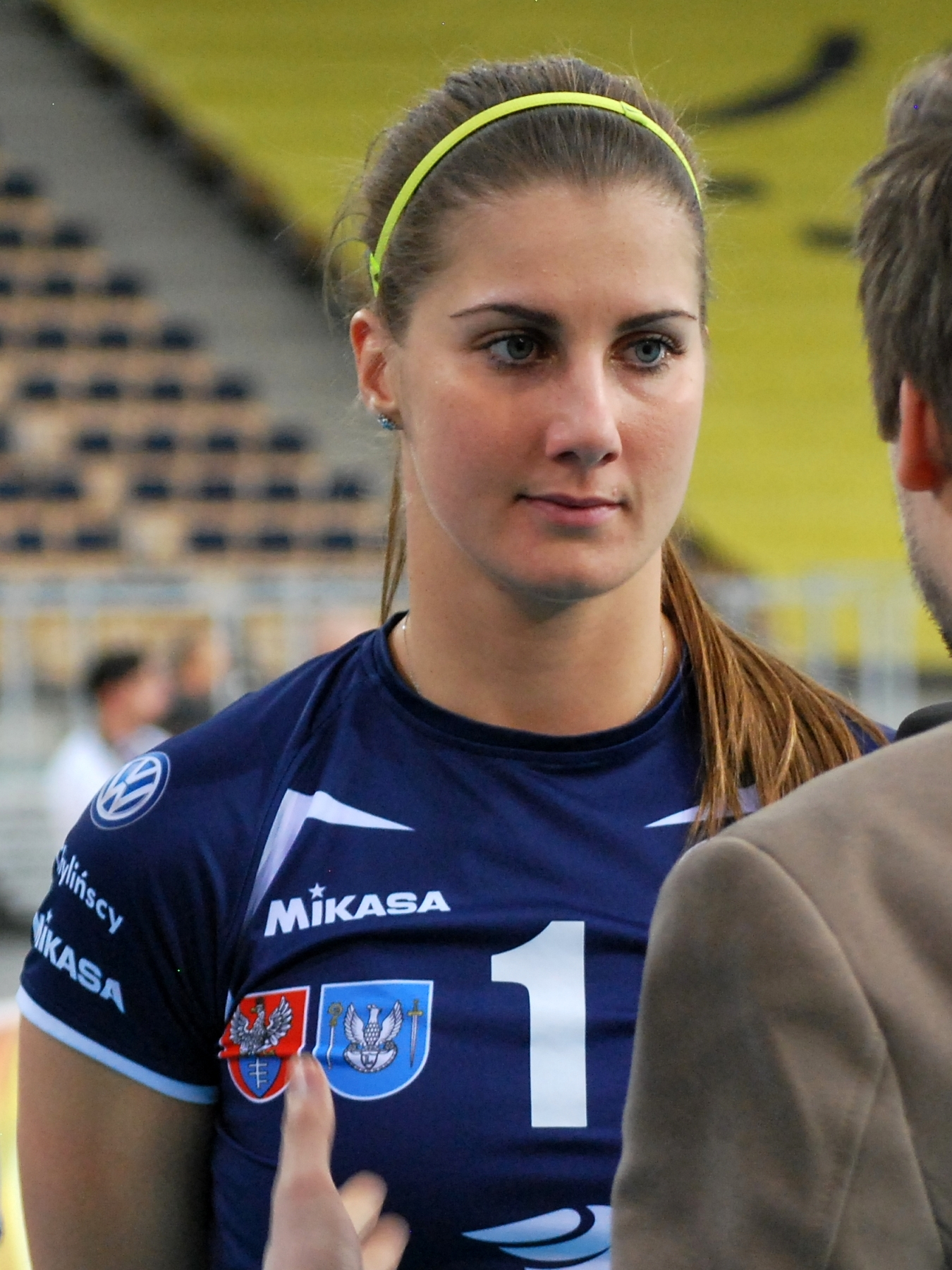

Personal information
- Nationality: Serbian
- Born: 31 December 1986 (age 39)
- Height: 1.84 m (6 ft 0 in)
- Weight: 70 kg (150 lb)
- Spike: 294 cm (116 in)
- Block: 280 cm (110 in)

Volleyball information
- Number: 8 (national)

Olga Raonić (born 31 December 1986 in Belgrade) is a Serbian volleyball player who plays as an outside hitter.

She competed in the 2013 FIVB World Grand Prix.

== Clubs ==
Club	Country	From	To
Radnički Beograd	Serbia	2001-2002	2007-2008
Dinamo Pančevo	Serbia	2008-2009	2008-2009
G.S. Iraklis Thessaloniki	Greece	2009-2010	2009-2010
VC Wiesbaden	Germany	2010-2011	2010-2011
SC Potsdam	Germany	2011-2012	2011-2012
ŽOK Spartak	Serbia	2012-2013	2012-2013
LTS Legionovia Legionowo	Poland	2013-2014	…
