= ŽOK Ub =

- Full name: Ženski odbojkaški klub Ub
- Founded: 2005
- Ground: SH Ub
- Chairman: Ivana Vasiljević
- Manager: Marijana Boričić
- League: Serbian Women's SuperLiga

ŽOK Ub (Serbian: ЖОК Уб) is a Serbian women's volleyball club based in the town of Ub, Serbia. Founded in 2005, the club competes in the Serbian Women's SuperLiga, the highest level of women’s volleyball in Serbia.

Since its establishment, ŽOK Ub has grown into one of the competitive clubs of Serbian volleyball, winning multiple national trophies including the Serbian Cup and the Serbian Super Cup.

== Honours ==
=== National competitions ===
- Serbian Championship: 1

2020–21

- Serbian Cup: 3

2020, 2023, 2026
Finalists: 2021

- Serbian Super Cup: 1

2020
Finalists: 2021, 2023

== History ==
ŽOK Ub was founded in 2005 and quickly established itself as one of the region’s emerging volleyball programs. Over the years, the club progressed through the national league system and eventually earned promotion to the SuperLiga, where it has remained competitive.

== Notable players ==
- (Serbia) Katarina Đorđević

== See also ==
- Serbian Women's Volleyball League
- Serbian Women's Volleyball Cup
- Serbian Women's Volleyball Super Cup
