= Serbian Women's Volleyball Cup =

Volleyball in Serbia

- Sport: Volleyball
- Founded: 2007
- Administrator: OSSRB
- Country: Serbia
- Continent: Europe
- Most titles: OK Crvena Zvezda (5 titles)
- Website: https://www.ossrb.org/

The Serbian Women's Volleyball Cup is an official women's volleyball competition in Serbia. It was first introduced in 2007 and teams from all around divisions compete in this tournament. OK Crvena Zvezda is the most successful team with 6 titles won.

== Winners list ==
Years	Winners	Score	Runners-up
2007	Poštar 064 Belgrade	3 - 2 (17-25, 25-20, 14-25, 25-15, 15-13)	OK Crvena Zvezda
2008	Poštar 064 Belgrade	3 - 1 (25-19, 25-15, 23-25, 25-20)	ŽOK Dinamo Pančevo
2009	Poštar 064 Belgrade	3 - 0 (25-16, 25-21, 25-17)	OK Crvena Zvezda
2010	OK Crvena Zvezda	3 - 1 (19-25, 25-23, 26-24, 25-20)	ŽOK Dinamo Pančevo
2011	OK Crvena Zvezda	3 - 0 (25-20, 25-15, 25-22)	OK Vizura
2012	OK Crvena Zvezda	3 - 0 (25-21, 25-20, 25-13)	ŽOK Spartak Subotica
2013	OK Crvena Zvezda	3 - 1 (26-28, 25-19, 25-23, 25-23)	OK Vizura
2014	OK Crvena Zvezda	3 - 2 (21-25, 25-22, 25-13, 17-25, 15-13)	OK Partizan Vizura
2015	OK Vizura	3 - 0 (25-23, 25-17, 25-22)	OK Tent
2016	OK Vizura	3 - 0 (25-21, 25-22, 25-15)	ŽOK Jedinstvo Stara Pazova
2017	ŽOK Jedinstvo Stara Pazova	3 - 0 (25-11, 25-21, 25-20)	ŽOK Dinamo Pančevo
2018	ŽOK Železničar Lajkovac	3 - 2 (25-23, 21-25, 25-18, 24-26, 15-9)	OK Crvena Zvezda
2019	ŽOK Železničar Lajkovac	3 - 0 (25-22, 25-19, 25-21)	OK Crvena Zvezda
2020	ŽOK Ub	3 - 2 (25-15, 24-26, 25-13, 21-25, 15-9)	ŽOK Jedinstvo Stara Pazova
2021	ŽOK Železničar Lajkovac	3 - 0 (25-18, 25-19, 25-22)	ŽOK Ub
2022	OK Crvena Zvezda	3 - 1 (25-18, 25-14, 18-25, 25-23)	ŽOK Železničar Lajkovac
2023	ŽOK Ub	3 - 2 (25-27, 19-25, 25-23, 25-23, 15-12)	ŽOK Jedinstvo Stara Pazova
2024	ŽOK Jedinstvo Stara Pazova	3 - 2 (25-14, 28-30, 14-25, 25-16, 16-14)	OK Tent
2025	OK Tent	3 - 0 (25-22, 25-19, 25-15)	ŽOK Železničar Lajkovac

=== Honours by club ===
Rk	Club	Titles	City	Years won
1	OK Crvena Zvezda	6	Belgrade	2010, 2011, 2012, 2013, 2014, 2022
2	Poštar 064 Belgrade	3	Belgrade	2007, 2008, 2009
3	ŽOK Železničar Lajkovac	3	Lajkovac	2018, 2019, 2021
4	OK Vizura	2	Belgrade	2015, 2016
5	ŽOK Ub	2	Ub	2020, 2023
6	ŽOK Jedinstvo	2	Stara Pazova	2017, 2024
7	OK Tent	1	Obrenovac	2025
