= ŽOK Dinamo =

ŽOK Dinamo Pančevo
- Full name: Ženski odbojkaški klub Dinamo Pančevo
- Founded: 1973
- Ground: HS "Strelište", Pančevo
- Chairman: Božidar Nikolić
- Manager: Aleksandar Vladisavljev
- League: Serbian Women's SuperLiga

ŽOK Dinamo Pančevo (Serbian: ЖОК Динамо Панчево) is a Serbian women's volleyball club based in Pančevo. Founded in 1973, the club has been one of the long-standing participants in Serbia’s top-level women’s volleyball competitions.

Dinamo competed in the Serbian SuperLiga from 2007 to 2020, including a period under the sponsored name Dinamo Azotara Pančevo (2006–2012). The club has reached the finals of the Serbian National Cup three times and has also taken part in European competitions such as the CEV Cup and the Challenge Cup.

== History ==
ŽOK Dinamo was founded in 1973 in Pančevo, Serbia. The club gradually developed through the Yugoslav and Serbian volleyball systems and achieved major stability in the late 2000s when it secured promotion to the Serbian SuperLiga.

From 2007 to 2020, Dinamo had a continuous presence in the country’s top division. During this period, the club competed in the CEV Cup and Challenge Cup and reached three Serbian Cup finals (2008, 2010, 2017).

Dinamo has also served as a developmental hub for many prominent Serbian players, several of whom went on to represent the national team at European and world championships.

== Honours ==
=== National competitions ===
- Serbian Women's Volleyball Cup
  - Finalists (3): 2008, 2010, 2017

== Notable players ==
- Olga Raonić
- Slađana Mirković
- Milena Rašić
