= ŽOK Poštar =

OK Poštar
- Full name: Odbojkaški klub Poštar
- Founded: 1952
- Ground: Velefarm "Torlak" (Capacity: 500)
- League: Serbian First League
- Website: www.okpostar.rs

OK Poštar (Serbian: Одбојкашки клуб Поштар) is a Serbian women's volleyball club based in Belgrade. The team currently competes in the Serbian First League, the second tier of women's volleyball in Serbia.

Founded in 1952, OK Poštar is one of the oldest women's volleyball clubs in Serbia and has a distinguished history, including four national championships and six national cups.

== History ==
OK Poštar was established in 1952. Between 1958 and 1973, the club was among the leading volleyball teams in Yugoslavia. After this period, Poštar dropped to the lower tiers of competition.

The club returned to the First Federal League ("Prva A liga") in 1993, marking the beginning of a new competitive era. Poštar achieved its first major success in 1995 when, led by coach Goran Nešić, the team won the national cup.

In the 2003–04 and 2004–05 seasons, Poštar won back-to-back national cups. Under the leadership of head coach Darko Zakoč, Poštar entered its most successful period, winning *three consecutive domestic doubles* (league + cup titles), establishing itself as the dominant force in Serbian women's volleyball.

In the 2009–10 season, Poštar suffered one of its worst results, finishing the championship winless and falling out of the SuperLiga. However, due to a reorganization of the league system and expansion from 8 to 10 teams, Poštar retained SuperLiga status for the 2010–11 season. Despite this reprieve, the team again finished last in 2010–11 and was relegated.

Since 2012, the club's official name no longer includes "064," following the expiration of a sponsorship agreement.

== Honours ==
=== National Championships (4) ===
- Champions of Serbia and Montenegro (1): 2006
- Champions of Serbia (3): 2007, 2008, 2009

=== National Cups (6) ===
- Yugoslav Cup (1): 1995
- Serbia and Montenegro Cup (2): 2004, 2005
- Serbian Cup (3): 2007, 2008, 2009

== Notable players ==
Notable volleyball players who have competed for OK Poštar include:

- Ana Antonijević
- Jovana Brakočević
- Stefana Veljković
- Jovana Vesović
- Bojana Živković
- Jasna Majstorović
- Maja Ognjenović
- Silvija Popović
- Aleksandra Ranković
