= P.A.O.K. Women's Volleyball =

Greek volleyball club

PAOK
- Nickname: Double-Headed Eagle of the North
- Founded: 1985 (Refounded: 2010)
- Ground: Mikra Indoor Arena I (Capacity: 1,200)
- Chairman: Kostas Amoiridis
- Manager: (Greece) Christos Patras
- League: A1 Ethniki
- 2024–25: 2nd
- Website: Club home page
- Championships: 1 Greek Cup

Uniforms
Home	Away

'P.A.O.K. Women's Volleyball' Club or PAOK Women's Volley, is a Greek volleyball club based in Thessaloniki and part of the major multi-sport club PAOK. The department was founded in 1985 and refounded in 2010.

== History ==
PAOK women's volleyball club was only active for 13 years, from 1985 until 1998. In 2003 it merged with Filathlitikos and ceased to exist.

It was founded again in 2010 and is currently and after reaching A2 it fell again in the 3rd level for 2012–13, B Ethiki. In 2017 the team promoted into A2 Ethniki Women's Volleyball. In 2019 the club won the Pre League Championship, and promoted to the A1 Ethniki. In 2021 the club won the Greek Cup.

== Honours ==
=== Domestic competitions ===
- Greek Cup
  - Winners (1): 2020–21

== Recent Seasons ==
Season	Division	Place	Greek Cup
2016–17	B Ethniki (3rd Tier)	1st	Last 32
2017–18	A2 Ethniki (3rd Tier/First phase) (Note: In 2017 was founded the Pre League Dision, which became the second level)	1st	Last 16
2018–19	Pre League (2nd Tier/Second phase)	1st	Quarter-Finals
2019–20	A1 Ethniki	5th (Note: The 2019–20 season of the Greek Championship was wrapped up due to COVID-19 pandemic. PAOK was at the 5th place when it stopped.)	Abandoned (Note: The 2019–20 season of the Greek Cup was abandoned due to COVID-19 pandemic. PAOK was at the semi-finals when it stopped.)
2020–21	A1 Ethniki	– (Note: The 2020–21 of the Greek Championship was abandoned due to COVID-19 pandemic while PAOK was in the 1st place)	Winner
2021–22	A1 Ethniki	3rd	Last 16
2022–23	A1 Ethniki	3rd	Semi-Finals
2023–24	A1 Ethniki	6th	Quarter-Finals
2024–25	A1 Ethniki	2nd	Quarter-Finals
2025–26	A1 Ethniki	7th	Semi-Finals

== Current squad ==
Shirt No.	Nationality	Player	Height	Birth Date
Middle blockers
15		Mariya Krivoshiyska	1.90	06/09/2001
18		Andromachi Tsioga	1.90	03/11/2001
14		Kyriaki Terzoglou	1.86	22/11/2003
12		Tatiana Armoutsi	1.84	24/05/2003
Outside hitters
10		Maria Klepkou	1.78	13/05/2000
6		Hester Jasper	1.75	07/05/2001
11	(Greece)	Elena Baka	1.86	15/10/2001
77		Eleftheria Gargala	1.78	16/4/2004
Opposites
7		Charikleia Ntafopoulou	1.84	13/01/2006
21		Marta Drpa	1.92	20/04/1989
88		Alkistis Karafoulidou	1.95	13/09/1999
Setters
8		Ilka Van de Vyver	1.80	26/04/1993
3		Evangelia Athanasiadou	1.74	09/12/2001
Libero
1		Martina Xanthopoulou	1.63	24/10/1998
5		Eirini Bitsaktsi	1.63	01/09/2007
Coach
	(Greece)	Christos Patras		1/1/1964
Assistant coach
	(Greece)	Dimitris Efraimidis	1.93	19/12/1990

== Former players ==
(Brazil) Carolina Albuquerque
(South Korea) Lee Jae-yeong
(South Korea) Lee Da-yeong
(Spain) (Equatorial Guinea) Milagros Collar
(Greece) Eleni Kiosi
(Greece) Evangelia Chantava
(Greece) Olga Strantzali

== Greek Cup Finals ==
Finals	Winner	Finalist	Score
2021	PAOK	A.O. Thiras	3–0
Total	1	0	

== European record ==
Season	Competition	Round	Club	Home	Away	Aggregate	Qual.
2021–22	CEV Cup	R32	(Belgium) Asterix Avo	3–2	3–0	6–2	
2021–22	CEV Cup	R16	(Romania) Alba Blaj	1–3	0–3	1–6	
2022–23	CEV Cup	R32	(Czech Republic) Královo Pole Brno	3–2	1–3	2–5	
2023–24	CEV Challenge Cup	QR	(Cyprus) Olympiada Neapolis	3–1	3–2	6–3	
2023–24	CEV Challenge Cup	R32	(Czech Republic) VK Prostějov	3–0	3–1	6–1	
2023–24	CEV Challenge Cup	R16	(Croatia) Dinamo Zagreb	0–3	3–0	3–3 (15–6)	
2023–24	CEV Challenge Cup	QF	(Germany) VC Wiesbaden	0–3	0–3	0–6	
2025–26	CEV Cup	R32	(Slovenia) OTP Banka Branik	0–3	0–3	0–6	

Season	Competition	Round	Club	Score	Position	Qual.
2024–25	BVA Cup	RQR	(Kosovo) KV Drita	3–0	2nd	
2024–25	BVA Cup	RQR	(Bosnia and Herzegovina) ZOK Igman	3–0	2nd	
2024–25	BVA Cup	RQR	(Turkey) Galatasaray S.K.	0–3	2nd	

== See also ==
- PAOK Men's Volleyball Club
