= OK Vizura =

Serbian women's volleyball club

OK Vizura Ruma
- Full name: Odbojkaški Klub Vizura
- Short name: Vizura
- Nickname: Sharks
- Founded: 2003
- Ground: Hala "Srce Srema", Ruma, Serbia (Capacity: 2,000)
- Chairman: Zoran Radojičić
- Head coach: Dejan Desnica
- League: Super League
- 2016–17: 1st
- Website: Club home page

Uniforms
Home	Away

OK Vizura is a Serbian women's volleyball club based in Belgrade and currently playing in the Super League.

== Previous names ==
Due to sponsorship, the club have competed under the following names:

- OK Vizura (2003–2012)
- Vizura Wall Art (2012–2013)
- Partizan Vizura (2013–2014)
- OK Vizura (2014–2017)
- OK Vizura Ruma (2017–present)

== History ==
Established in 2003, the club made progress in the lower national leagues reaching the Super League in 2009. Since its debut at the Super League, the club has been competitive and finished second in both the Super League and Serbian Cup at the 2010–11 season. Another Cup final was reached in 2012–13.

Ahead of the 2013–14 season, the club made an agreement with Partizan Belgrade where Vizura would receive financial support and use the name, colours and logo of Partizan. The club changed its name to Partizan Vizura and won the first major title at the beginning of the season, the Serbian Super Cup. The club reached another Serbian Cup final before claiming the Super League for the first time that season. Despite the successful season, the association with Partizan lasted only that season.

The club's name was changed back to OK Vizura and more success followed with the club winning another three Super Leagues (2014–15, 2015–16 and 2016–17), two Cups (2014–15 and 2015–16) and three Super Cups (2014, 2015 and 2017).

== Honours ==
=== National competitions ===
- National League: 4

2013–14, 2014–15, 2015–16, 2016–17

- Serbian Cup: 2

2014–15, 2015–16

- Serbian Super Cup: 4

2013, 2014, 2015, 2017

== Team ==
Season 2017–2018, as of December 2017.

Number	Player	Position	Height (m)	Weight (kg)	Birth date
1	(Serbia) Slađana Erić	Middle blocker	1.86	78	29 July 1983 (age 41)
2	(Serbia) Katarina Gajević	Outside hitter	1.85	68	12 October 2000 (age 24)
3	(Serbia) Milena Dimić	Libero	1.71	68	31 August 1997 (age 27)
4	(Serbia) Sara Lozo	Outside hitter	1.85	69	29 April 1997 (age 28)
5	(Serbia) Anđela Mićunović	Libero	1.68	63	11 March 1999 (age 26)
6	(Serbia) Jovana Adžić	Middle blocker	1.95	79	25 February 2000 (age 25)
7	(Serbia) Katarina Lazović	Outside hitter	1.83	66	12 September 1999 (age 25)
8	(Serbia) Maja Aleksić	Middle blocker	1.88	72	6 June 1997 (age 28)
10	(Serbia) Anđela Veselinović	Setter	1.77	61	5 February 1999 (age 26)
13	(Serbia) Jovana Kocić	Middle blocker	1.91	78	24 February 1998 (age 27)
14	(Serbia) Aleksandra Ćirović	Setter	1.80	64	30 September 1997 (age 27)
15	(Serbia) Ana Pejićić	Outside hitter	1.91	74	5 November 2000 (age 24)
16	(Serbia) Isidora Rodić	Middle blocker	1.85	77	27 January 2001 (age 24)
17	(Serbia) Mila Kocić	Libero	1.70	67	31 August 2001 (age 23)
18	(Serbia) Sara Carić	Opposite	1.92	62	1 February 2001 (age 24)

2016–2017 Team
Number	Player	Position	Height (m)	Weight (kg)	Birth date
1	(Serbia) Slađana Erić	Middle blocker	1.85	72	29 July 1983 (age 41)
2	(Serbia) Katarina Gajević	Outside hitter	1.85	70	12 October 2000 (age 24)
3	(Serbia) Jovana Ašković	Opposite	1.90	74	12 June 1999 (age 26)
4	(Serbia) Sara Lozo	Outside hitter	1.85	65	29 April 1997 (age 28)
5	(Serbia) Jovana Kocić	Middle blocker	1.90	80	24 February 1998 (age 27)
6	(Serbia) Jovana Adžić	Middle blocker	1.94	81	25 February 2000 (age 25)
7	(Serbia) Katarina Lazović	Outside hitter	1.81	65	12 September 1999 (age 25)
8	(Serbia) Maja Aleksić	Middle blocker	1.87	77	6 June 1997 (age 28)
9	(Serbia) Teodora Pušić	Libero	1.68	54	12 March 1993 (age 32)
10	(Serbia) Anđela Veselinović	Setter	1.77	61	5 February 1999 (age 26)
11	(Serbia) Tamara Zlatković	Outside hitter	1.85	67	29 June 1999 (age 26)
14	(Serbia) Aleksandra Ćirović	Setter	1.79	61	30 September 1997 (age 27)
15	(Serbia) Ana Matović	Opposite	1.87	77	18 January 1992 (age 33)
16	(Serbia) Isidora Rodić	Middle blocker	1.85		27 January 2001 (age 24)
17	(Serbia) Elena-Marta Djoković	Middle blocker	1.90	75	29 June 2000 (age 25)
18	(Serbia) Sara Carić	Outside hitter	1.93	72	1 February 2001 (age 24)
20	(Serbia) Andjela Mićunović	Libero	1.66	52	11 March 1999 (age 26)

== See also ==
- ŽOK Partizan
