= Regan Hood Scott =

American volleyball player (born 1983)

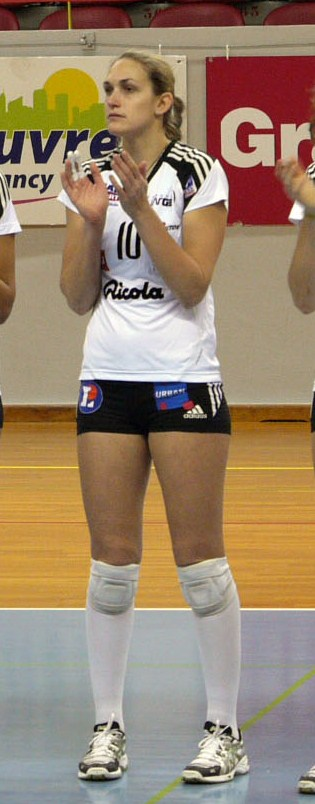
- Hood Scott in 2011

Personal information
- Full name: Regan Elizabeth Hood Scott
- Nationality: American
- Born: August 10, 1983 (age 43); Lafayette, Louisiana, U.S.
- Height: 6 ft 2 in (188 cm)
- Weight: 174 lb (79 kg)
- Spike: 123 in (312 cm)
- Block: 120 in (305 cm)
- Education: Louisiana State University

Volleyball information
- Position: Outside-spiker
- Current club: Olympiacos S. F.Piraeus
- Number: 6

Career
Years	Teams
2001–2005	LSU Lady Tigers
2005–2006	Ícaro Palma
2006–2007	DOK Dwingeloo
2007–2008	CV Albacete
2008–2009	Terville Florange
2009–2011	ASPTT Mulhouse
2011–2012	VC Baku
2012–2013	CS Dinamo București
2013–2015	İller Bankası
2014–2015	Criollas de Caguas
2015–2016	Sarıyer Belediyespor
2016–2016	MKS Dąbrowa Górnicza
2017–2017	Jakarta Pertamina Energi
2017–2018	Samsun Anakent
2018–2018	Pallavolo Scandicci
2019–2019	Olympiacos S.F. Piraeus

National team
2011–2013	United States
- Last updated: December 11, 2016

Regan Elizabeth Hood Scott (born August 10, 1983), also known as Regan Hood or Regan Scott, is an American female volleyball player, who plays as an Outside-spiker. She was part of the United States women's national volleyball team and she participated in the 2013 FIVB Volleyball World Grand Prix. At club level, she plays for Olympiacos S.F. Piraeus in Hellenic Volley league.

== Clubs ==
- (United States) LSU Lady Tigers (2001–2005)
- (Netherlands) DOK Dwingeloo (2006–2007)
- (Spain) CV Albacete (2007–2008)
- (France) Terville Florange (2008–2009)
- (France) ASPTT Mulhouse (2009–2011)
- (Azerbaijan) VC Baku (2011–2012)
- (Romania) CS Dinamo București (2012–2013)
- (Turkey) İller Bankası (2013–2015)
- (Puerto Rico) Criollas de Caguas (2015)
- (Turkey) Sarıyer Belediyespor (2015–2016)
- (Poland) MKS Dąbrowa Górnicza (2016)
- (Indonesia) Jakarta Pertamina Energi (2017)
- (Turkey) Samsun Anakent (2017–2018)
- (Italy) Pallavolo Scandicci (2018)
- (Greece) Olympiacos Piraeus (2018–2019)
- (Greece) Olympiacos Piraeus (2019)
- (Greece) Olympiacos Piraeus (2020–2021)
- (Romania) CSM Volei Alba-Blaj (2021)
- (Puerto Rico) Leonas De Ponce (2021)

== Sporting achievements ==
=== National team ===
- 2011 Pan American Games
- 2014 Pan-American Volleyball Cup (Mexico City)

=== Clubs ===
==== International competitions ====
- 2012 CEV Women's Challenge Cup, with VC Baku

==== National championships ====
- 2009–10 French Championship, with ASPTT Mulhouse
- 2010–11 French Championship, with ASPTT Mulhouse
- 2013–12 Romanian Championship, with CS Dinamo București
- 2014–15 Puerto Rican Championship, with Criollas de Caguas
- 2018–19 Hellenic Championship, with Olympiacos Piraeus

==== National cups ====
- 2009–10 Cup of France, with ASPTT Mulhouse
- 2012–13 Romanian Cup, with CS Dinamo București
- 2018–19 Hellenic Cup, with Olympiacos Piraeus
