= 2024–25 CEV Women's Champions League =

- League: CEV Champions League
- Sport: Volleyball
- Duration: Qualifying round: 1 October – 10 October 2024; Main tournament: 5 November 2024 – 4 May 2025
- Matches: 78 (main tournament)
- Teams: Main tournament: 20; Total: 25

Finals
- Venue: (Turkey) Ülker Sports Arena, Istanbul
- Champions: (Italy) A. Carraro Imoco Conegliano
- Runners-up: (Italy) Savino Del Bene Scandicci
- Finals MVP: (Sweden) Isabelle Haak

CEV Women's Champions League seasons
- ← 2023–24 2025–26 →

The 2024–25 CEV Women's Champions League was the 65th edition of the highest level European volleyball club competition organised by the European Volleyball Confederation.

== Teams ==
25 teams registered for the CEV Champions League.

Rank	Country	Points	No. of teams			Qualified teams
Rank	Country	Points	League	Qual	Total	Qualified teams
1	Italy	561.67	3	–	3	A. Carraro Imoco Conegliano
1	Italy	561.67	3	–	3	Savino Del Bene Scandicci
1	Italy	561.67	3	–	3	Numia Vero Volley Milano
2	Turkey	498.38	3	–	3	Fenerbahçe Medicana Istanbul
2	Turkey	498.38	3	–	3	Eczacıbaşı Dynavit Istanbul
2	Turkey	498.38	3	–	3	VakifBank Istanbul
3	Poland (Note: One of Poland's three regular slots was changed to a qualification slot following the withdrawal by the winner of the 2023–24 Polish volleyball league, Chemik Police.)	357.33	2	1	3	Developres Rzeszów
3	Poland	357.33	2	1	3	BKS Bostik ZGO Bielsko-Biała
3	Poland	357.33	2	1	3	PGE Grot Budowlani Łódź
5	France	209.34	2	–	2	Levallois Paris Saint Cloud
5	France	209.34	2	–	2	Neptunes Nantes
6	Germany	198.66	2	–	2	Allianz MTV Stuttgart
6	Germany	198.66	2	–	2	SSC Palmberg Schwerin
8	Serbia (Note: Serbia's regular slot was changed to a qualification slot following the withdrawal by the winner of the 2023–24 Serbian volleyball league, Jedinstvo Stara Pazova.)	97.33	–	1	1	OK TENT Obrenovac
9	Bulgaria	94.66	1	–	1	Maritza Plovdiv
10	Hungary (Note: Hungary and Slovenia were promoted from a qualification slot to a regular slot following a decision made by the CEV Board of Administration to suspend Russian teams.)	87.33	1	–	1	Vasas Óbuda Budapest
11	Slovenia	77.00	1	–	1	Calcit Kamnik
12	Romania	73.00	–	1	1	CSO Voluntari 2005
14	Spain	57.00	–	1	1	Hidramar Gran Canaria
16	Croatia	46.00	–	1	1	Mladost Zagreb
18	Bosnia and Herzegovina	33.00	–	1	1	ŽOK Gacko RD Swisslion
21	Belgium	24.00	–	1	1	Asterix Avo
N/A	Montenegro	0.00	–	1	1	OK Herceg Novi
N/A	North Macedonia	0.00	–	1	1	Rabotnički Skopje
N/A	Portugal	0.00	–	1	1	FC Porto

== Qualification ==
10 teams registered for the CEV Champions League qualification round. The 5 winning teams from the qualification round joined the 15 teams already directly qualified for the league round.

Team 1	Agg.	Team 2	1st leg	2nd leg
FC Porto (Portugal)	5–1	(Spain) Hidramar Gran Canaria	3–0	3–2
Rabotnički Skopje (North Macedonia)	0–6	(Romania) CSO Voluntari 2005	0–3	0–3
OK Herceg Novi (Montenegro)	0–6	(Poland) PGE Grot Budowlani Łódź	0–3	0–3
Asterix Avo (Belgium)	0–6	(Serbia) OK TENT	1–3	0–3
ŽOK Gacko RD Swisslion (Bosnia and Herzegovina)	0–6	(Croatia) Mladost Zagreb	1–3	1–3

=== Matches ===
Date	Time		Score		Set 1	Set 2	Set 3	Set 4	Set 5	Total	Report
First leg
1 Oct	20:00	FC Porto (Portugal)	3–0	(Spain) Hidramar Gran Canaria	25–19	25–23	25–18			75–60	Report
2 Oct	19:00	Rabotnički Skopje (North Macedonia)	0–3	(Romania) CSO Voluntari 2005	14–25	13–25	12–25			39–75	Report
2 Oct	20:00	OK Herceg Novi (Montenegro)	0–3	(Poland) PGE Grot Budowlani Łódź	22–25	25–27	18–25			65–77	Report
2 Oct	20:00	Asterix Avo (Belgium)	1–3	(Serbia) OK TENT	20–25	20–25	25–23	12–25		77–98	Report
3 Oct	18:00	ŽOK Gacko RD Swisslion (Bosnia and Herzegovina)	1–3	(Croatia) Mladost Zagreb	25–19	22–25	22–25	17–25		86–94	Report
Second leg
8 Oct	19:00	PGE Grot Budowlani Łódź (Poland)	3–0	(Montenegro) OK Herceg Novi	25–20	25–20	25–21			75–61	Report
9 Oct	19:00	CSO Voluntari 2005 (Romania)	3–0	(North Macedonia) Rabotnički Skopje	25–11	25–16	25–15			75–42	Report
9 Oct	20:00	OK TENT (Serbia)	3–0	(Belgium) Asterix Avo	25–13	25–19	25–20			75–52	Report
9 Oct	21:00	Hidramar Gran Canaria (Spain)	2–3	(Portugal) FC Porto	25–22	23–25	25–21	18–25	14–16	105–109	Report
10 Oct	21:00	Mladost Zagreb (Croatia)	3–1	(Bosnia and Herzegovina) ŽOK Gacko RD Swisslion	25–20	22–25	25–20	25–17		97–82	Report

== Pools composition ==
The drawing of lots was held on 16 July 2024 in Luxembourg City.

Pool A	Pool B	Pool C
A. Carraro Imoco Conegliano	Eczacıbaşı Dynavit Istanbul	Numia Vero Volley Milano
Developres Rzeszów	Levallois Paris Saint Cloud	VakifBank Istanbul
Maritza Plovdiv	SSC Palmberg Schwerin	Calcit Kamnik
Mladost Zagreb	OK TENT	FC Porto

Pool D	Pool E
Fenerbahçe Medicana Istanbul	Savino Del Bene Scandicci
PGE Grot Budowlani Łódź	BKS Bostik ZGO Bielsko-Biała
Neptunes Nantes	Allianz MTV Stuttgart
Vasas Óbuda Budapest	CSO Voluntari 2005

== League round ==
- The teams are split into 5 groups, each one featuring four teams.
- The top team in each pool automatically qualifies for the quarterfinals.
- All 2nd placed teams and the best 3rd placed team qualify for the playoffs.
- The remaining 3rd placed teams will compete in the quarterfinals of the 2024–25 CEV Cup.
- All times are local.

=== Pool standing procedure ===
The ranking of teams in the league round will be determined as follows:

1. Number of victories
2. Result points (3 points for 3–0 or 3–1 wins, 2 points for 3–2 win, 1 point for 2–3 loss, 0 points for 0–3 or 1–3 losses)
3. Set ratio (total sets won divided by total sets lost)
4. Points ratio (total points scored divided by total points conceded)
5. Head-to-Head results

=== Pool A ===
Pos	Team	Pld	W	L	Pts	SW	SL	SR	SPW	SPL	SPR	Qualification
1	(Italy) A. Carraro Imoco Conegliano	6	6	0	18	18	1	18.000	479	343	1.397	Quarterfinals
2	(Poland) Developres Rzeszów	6	4	2	12	13	7	1.857	462	410	1.127	Playoffs
3	(Bulgaria) Maritza Plovdiv	6	2	4	6	7	13	0.538	400	462	0.866	2024–25 CEV Cup
4	(Croatia) Mladost Zagreb	6	0	6	0	1	18	0.056	343	469	0.731	

Source: CEV

Date	Time		Score		Set 1	Set 2	Set 3	Set 4	Set 5	Total	Report
6 Nov	18:00	Developres Rzeszów (Poland)	3–1	(Bulgaria) Maritza Plovdiv	29–31	25–17	25–8	25–11		104–67	Report
7 Nov	20:30	A. Carraro Imoco Conegliano (Italy)	3–0	(Croatia) Mladost Zagreb	26–24	25–10	25–15			76–49	Report
12 Nov	19:00	Maritza Plovdiv (Bulgaria)	0–3	(Italy) A. Carraro Imoco Conegliano	23–25	17–25	17–25			57–75	Report
14 Nov	20:00	Mladost Zagreb (Croatia)	0–3	(Poland) Developres Rzeszów	15–25	18–25	23–25			56–75	Report
27 Nov	20:30	Developres Rzeszów (Poland)	1–3	(Italy) A. Carraro Imoco Conegliano	28–30	20–25	25–23	15–25		88–103	Report
28 Nov	20:00	Mladost Zagreb (Croatia)	1–3	(Bulgaria) Maritza Plovdiv	17–25	25–18	22–25	19–25		83–93	Report
10 Dec	18:00	Developres Rzeszów (Poland)	3–0	(Croatia) Mladost Zagreb	25–17	25–19	25–14			75–50	Report
10 Dec	20:30	A. Carraro Imoco Conegliano (Italy)	3–0	(Bulgaria) Maritza Plovdiv	25–18	25–12	25–19			75–49	Report
9 Jan	19:00	Maritza Plovdiv (Bulgaria)	0–3	(Poland) Developres Rzeszów	18–25	20–25	21–25			59–75	Report
9 Jan	20:00	Mladost Zagreb (Croatia)	0–3	(Italy) A. Carraro Imoco Conegliano	16–25	16–25	23–25			55–75	Report
22 Jan	19:00	Maritza Plovdiv (Bulgaria)	3–0	(Croatia) Mladost Zagreb	25–15	25–16	25–19			75–50	Report
22 Jan	20:30	A. Carraro Imoco Conegliano (Italy)	3–0	(Poland) Developres Rzeszów	25–11	25–15	25–19			75–45	Report

=== Pool B ===
Pos	Team	Pld	W	L	Pts	SW	SL	SR	SPW	SPL	SPR	Qualification
1	(Turkey) Eczacıbaşı Dynavit Istanbul	6	6	0	18	18	1	18.000	473	342	1.383	Quarterfinals
2	(Serbia) OK TENT	6	3	3	8	10	12	0.833	443	501	0.884	Playoffs
3	(Germany) SSC Palmberg Schwerin	6	3	3	8	9	11	0.818	432	426	1.014	Playoffs
4	(France) Levallois Paris Saint Cloud	6	0	6	2	5	18	0.278	457	536	0.853	

Source: CEV

Date	Time		Score		Set 1	Set 2	Set 3	Set 4	Set 5	Total	Report
6 Nov	17:00	Eczacıbaşı Dynavit Istanbul (Turkey)	3–0	(Serbia) OK TENT	25–12	25–11	25–21			75–44	Report
6 Nov	20:00	Levallois Paris Saint Cloud (France)	0–3	(Germany) SSC Palmberg Schwerin	19–25	13–25	23–25			55–75	Report
13 Nov	18:00	SSC Palmberg Schwerin (Germany)	0–3	(Turkey) Eczacıbaşı Dynavit Istanbul	23–25	21–25	11–25			55–75	Report
14 Nov	19:00	OK Tent (Serbia)	3–1	(France) Levallois Paris Saint Cloud	26–24	25–20	22–25	25–18		98–87	Report
26 Nov	20:00	Levallois Paris Saint Cloud (France)	0–3	(Turkey) Eczacıbaşı Dynavit Istanbul	25–27	22–25	21–25			68–77	Report
27 Nov	19:00	OK Tent (Serbia)	3–0	(Germany) SSC Palmberg Schwerin	25–19	25–23	25–18			75–60	Report
10 Dec	19:00	Eczacıbaşı Dynavit Istanbul (Turkey)	3–0	(Germany) SSC Palmberg Schwerin	25–17	25–23	25–18			75–58	Report
10 Dec	20:00	Levallois Paris Saint Cloud (France)	2–3	(Serbia) OK TENT	24–26	25–17	25–19	21–25	13–15	108–102	Report
8 Jan	18:00	SSC Palmberg Schwerin (Germany)	3–2	(France) Levallois Paris Saint Cloud	23–25	25–12	25–21	21–25	15–12	109–95	Report
9 Jan	19:00	OK TENT (Serbia)	1–3	(Turkey) Eczacıbaşı Dynavit Istanbul	25–21	10–25	16–25	22–25		73–96	Report
22 Jan	17:00	Eczacıbaşı Dynavit Istanbul (Turkey)	3–0	(France) Levallois Paris Saint Cloud	25–11	25–15	25–18			75–44	Report
22 Jan	18:00	SSC Palmberg Schwerin (Germany)	3–0	(Serbia) OK TENT	25–20	25–13	25–18			75–51	Report

=== Pool C ===
Pos	Team	Pld	W	L	Pts	SW	SL	SR	SPW	SPL	SPR	Qualification
1	(Turkey) VakifBank Istanbul	6	5	1	15	16	4	4.000	484	373	1.298	Quarterfinals
2	(Italy) Numia Vero Volley Milano	6	5	1	15	15	4	3.750	448	350	1.280	Playoffs
3	(Portugal) FC Porto	6	2	4	5	6	14	0.429	399	477	0.836	2024–25 CEV Cup
4	(Slovenia) Calcit Kamnik	6	0	6	1	3	18	0.167	388	519	0.748	

Source: CEV

Date	Time		Score		Set 1	Set 2	Set 3	Set 4	Set 5	Total	Report
6 Nov	19:30	VakifBank Istanbul (Turkey)	3–1	(Slovenia) Calcit Kamnik	25–21	22–25	25–15	25–12		97–73	Report
7 Nov	20:00	Numia Vero Volley Milano (Italy)	3–0	(Portugal) FC Porto	25–15	27–25	25–17			77–57	Report
12 Nov	18:00	Calcit Kamnik (Slovenia)	0–3	(Italy) Numia Vero Volley Milano	8–25	14–25	17–25			39–75	Report
12 Nov	20:30	FC Porto (Portugal)	0–3	(Turkey) VakifBank Istanbul	13–25	16–25	13–25			42–75	Report
28 Nov	19:30	VakifBank Istanbul (Turkey)	3–0	(Italy) Numia Vero Volley Milano	25–19	25–18	25–17			75–54	Report
28 Nov	20:30	FC Porto (Portugal)	3–0	(Slovenia) Calcit Kamnik	25–20	25–18	25–18			75–56	Report
10 Dec	19:30	VakifBank Istanbul (Turkey)	3–0	(Portugal) FC Porto	25–14	25–18	25–18			75–50	Report
11 Dec	19:00	Numia Vero Volley Milano (Italy)	3–0	(Slovenia) Calcit Kamnik	25–15	25–11	25–13			75–39	Report
7 Jan	18:00	Calcit Kamnik (Slovenia)	0–3	(Turkey) VakifBank Istanbul	22–25	18–25	23–25			63–75	Report
8 Jan	20:30	FC Porto (Portugal)	0–3	(Italy) Numia Vero Volley Milano	13–25	24–26	16–25			53–76	Report
22 Jan	17:00	Calcit Kamnik (Slovenia)	2–3	(Portugal) FC Porto	30–28	25–17	28–30	15–25	20–22	118–122	Report
22 Jan	20:00	Numia Vero Volley Milano (Italy)	3–1	(Turkey) VakifBank Istanbul	25–21	16–25	25–22	25–19		91–87	Report

=== Pool D ===
Pos	Team	Pld	W	L	Pts	SW	SL	SR	SPW	SPL	SPR	Qualification
1	(Turkey) Fenerbahçe Medicana Istanbul	6	6	0	18	18	3	6.000	518	394	1.315	Quarterfinals
2	(Poland) PGE Grot Budowlani Łódź	6	4	2	10	13	11	1.182	531	526	1.010	Playoffs
3	(Hungary) Vasas Óbuda Budapest	6	2	4	6	10	14	0.714	483	544	0.888	2024–25 CEV Cup
4	(France) Neptunes Nantes	6	0	6	2	5	18	0.278	465	533	0.872	

Source: CEV

Date	Time		Score		Set 1	Set 2	Set 3	Set 4	Set 5	Total	Report
5 Nov	20:00	Neptunes Nantes (France)	2–3	(Hungary) Vasas Óbuda Budapest	25–17	21–25	25–17	13–25	13–15	97–99	Report
6 Nov	20:00	Fenerbahçe Medicana Istanbul (Turkey)	3–0	(Poland) PGE Grot Budowlani Łódź	25–19	25–20	25–14			75–53	Report
12 Nov	18:00	PGE Grot Budowlani Łódź (Poland)	3–2	(France) Neptunes Nantes	25–19	25–18	18–25	23–25	15–13	106–100	Report
13 Nov	18:30	Vasas Óbuda Budapest (Hungary)	1–3	(Turkey) Fenerbahçe Medicana Istanbul	13–25	15–25	26–24	21–25		75–99	Report
27 Nov	20:00	Neptunes Nantes (France)	0–3	(Turkey) Fenerbahçe Medicana Istanbul	18–25	21–25	23–25			62–75	Report
28 Nov	18:00	PGE Grot Budowlani Łódź (Poland)	3–0	(Hungary) Vasas Óbuda Budapest	25–14	25–19	25–16			75–49	Report
10 Dec	20:30	Neptunes Nantes (France)	1–3	(Poland) PGE Grot Budowlani Łódź	25–17	34–36	18–25	22–25		99–103	Report
11 Dec	20:00	Fenerbahçe Medicana Istanbul (Turkey)	3–1	(Hungary) Vasas Óbuda Budapest	25–16	25–18	22–25	25–20		97–79	Report
7 Jan	18:00	PGE Grot Budowlani Łódź (Poland)	1–3	(Turkey) Fenerbahçe Medicana Istanbul	25–21	19–25	13–25	24–26		81–97	Report
8 Jan	18:30	Vasas Óbuda Budapest (Hungary)	3–0	(France) Neptunes Nantes	25–21	25–22	25–20			75–63	Report
22 Jan	18:30	Vasas Óbuda Budapest (Hungary)	2–3	(Poland) PGE Grot Budowlani Łódź	25–21	23–25	15–25	25–22	18–20	106–113	Report
22 Jan	20:00	Fenerbahçe Medicana Istanbul (Turkey)	3–0	(France) Neptunes Nantes	25–15	25–13	25–16			75–44	Report

=== Pool E ===
Pos	Team	Pld	W	L	Pts	SW	SL	SR	SPW	SPL	SPR	Qualification
1	(Italy) Savino Del Bene Scandicci	6	6	0	18	18	0	MAX	450	339	1.327	Quarterfinals
2	(Germany) Allianz MTV Stuttgart	6	3	3	8	10	13	0.769	488	518	0.942	Playoffs
3	(Poland) BKS Bostik ZGO Bielsko-Biała	6	2	4	6	7	14	0.500	466	494	0.943	2024–25 CEV Cup
4	(Romania) CSO Voluntari 2005	6	1	5	4	7	15	0.467	455	508	0.896	

Source: CEV

Date	Time		Score		Set 1	Set 2	Set 3	Set 4	Set 5	Total	Report
6 Nov	19:00	Savino Del Bene Scandicci (Italy)	3–0	(Romania) CSO Voluntari 2005	25–20	25–20	25–12			75–52	Report
7 Nov	18:00	BKS Bostik ZGO Bielsko-Biała (Poland)	3–1	(Germany) Allianz MTV Stuttgart	22–25	25–19	25–23	25–20		97–87	Report
13 Nov	19:00	Allianz MTV Stuttgart (Germany)	0–3	(Italy) Savino Del Bene Scandicci	17–25	22–25	21–25			60–75	Report
13 Nov	21:00	CSO Voluntari 2005 (Romania)	3–0	(Poland) BKS Bostik ZGO Bielsko-Biała	25–21	25–17	25–23			75–61	Report
27 Nov	18:00	BKS Bostik ZGO Bielsko-Biała (Poland)	0–3	(Italy) Savino Del Bene Scandicci	22–25	22–25	23–25			67–75	Report
27 Nov	19:00	CSO Voluntari 2005 (Romania)	1–3	(Germany) Allianz MTV Stuttgart	17–25	23–25	26–24	21–25		87–99	Report
11 Dec	18:00	BKS Bostik ZGO Bielsko-Biała (Poland)	3–1	(Romania) CSO Voluntari 2005	25–19	25–27	25–23	25–19		100–88	Report
11 Dec	19:00	Savino Del Bene Scandicci (Italy)	3–0	(Germany) Allianz MTV Stuttgart	25–16	25–12	25–22			75–50	Report
8 Jan	19:00	CSO Voluntari 2005 (Romania)	0–3	(Italy) Savino Del Bene Scandicci	20–25	16–25	16–25			52–75	Report
8 Jan	20:30	Allianz MTV Stuttgart (Germany)	3–1	(Poland) BKS Bostik ZGO Bielsko-Biała	25–19	19–25	25–19	25–20		94–83	Report
22 Jan	19:00	Allianz MTV Stuttgart (Germany)	3–2	(Romania) CSO Voluntari 2005	14–25	25–20	25–23	19–25	15–8	98–101	Report
22 Jan	20:00	Savino Del Bene Scandicci (Italy)	3–0	(Poland) BKS Bostik ZGO Bielsko-Biała	25–20	25–23	25–15			75–58	Report

=== First place ranking ===
Pos	Team	Pld	W	L	Pts	SW	SL	SR	SPW	SPL	SPR	Qualification
1	(Italy) Savino Del Bene Scandicci	6	6	0	18	18	0	MAX	450	339	1.327	Quarterfinals
2	(Italy) A. Carraro Imoco Conegliano	6	6	0	18	18	1	18.000	479	343	1.397	Quarterfinals
3	(Turkey) Eczacıbaşı Dynavit Istanbul	6	6	0	18	18	1	18.000	473	342	1.383	Quarterfinals
4	(Turkey) Fenerbahçe Medicana Istanbul	6	6	0	18	18	3	6.000	518	394	1.315	Quarterfinals
5	(Turkey) VakifBank Istanbul	6	5	1	15	16	4	4.000	484	373	1.298	Quarterfinals

Source: CEV

=== Second place ranking ===
Pos	Team	Pld	W	L	Pts	SW	SL	SR	SPW	SPL	SPR	Qualification
1	(Italy) Numia Vero Volley Milano	6	5	1	15	15	4	3.750	448	350	1.280	Playoffs
2	(Poland) Developres Rzeszów	6	4	2	12	13	7	1.857	462	410	1.127	Playoffs
3	(Poland) PGE Grot Budowlani Łódź	6	4	2	10	13	11	1.182	531	526	1.010	Playoffs
4	(Serbia) Tent Obrenovac	6	3	3	8	10	12	0.833	443	501	0.884	Playoffs
5	(Germany) Allianz MTV Stuttgart	6	3	3	8	10	13	0.769	488	518	0.942	Playoffs

Source: CEV

=== Third place ranking ===
Pos	Team	Pld	W	L	Pts	SW	SL	SR	SPW	SPL	SPR	Qualification
1	(Germany) SSC Palmberg Schwerin	6	3	3	8	9	11	0.818	432	426	1.014	Playoffs
2	(Hungary) Vasas Óbuda Budapest	6	2	4	6	10	14	0.714	483	544	0.888	2024–25 CEV Cup
3	(Bulgaria) Maritza Plovdiv	6	2	4	6	7	13	0.538	400	462	0.866	2024–25 CEV Cup
4	(Poland) BKS Bostik ZGO Bielsko-Biała	6	2	4	6	7	14	0.500	466	494	0.943	2024–25 CEV Cup
5	(Portugal) FC Porto	6	2	4	5	6	14	0.429	399	477	0.836	2024–25 CEV Cup

Source: CEV

== Bracket ==
Playoff 6
(Germany) SSC Palmberg Schwerin	0	0
(Italy) Numia Vero Volley Milano	3	3
(Germany) Allianz MTV Stuttgart	1	0
(Poland) Developres Rzeszów	3	3
(Serbia) Tent Obrenovac	0	1
(Poland) PGE Grot Budowlani Łódź	3	3

Quarterfinals
(Italy) Numia Vero Volley Milano	3	3
(Turkey) Eczacıbaşı Dynavit İstanbul	0	0
(Poland) Developres Rzeszów	0	0
(Italy) A. Carraro Imoco Conegliano	3	3
(Turkey) VakıfBank İstanbul	0	3	15
(Turkey) Fenerbahçe Medicana İstanbul	3	1	11
(Poland) PGE Grot Budowlani Łódź	0	0
(Italy) Savino Del Bene Scandicci	3	3

Semifinals
(Italy) Numia Vero Volley Milano	1
(Italy) A. Carraro Imoco Conegliano	3
(Turkey) VakıfBank Istanbul	0
(Italy) Savino Del Bene Scandicci	3

Final
(Italy) A. Carraro Imoco Conegliano	3
(Italy) Savino Del Bene Scandicci	0
Third place
(Italy) Numia Vero Volley Milano	3
(Turkey) VakıfBank Istanbul	1

== Playoff 6 ==
- The winners of the ties qualify for the quarterfinals.
- In case the teams are tied after two legs, a Golden Set is played immediately at the completion of the second leg.
- All times are local (UTC+01:00).

Team 1	Agg.	Team 2	1st leg	2nd leg
SSC Palmberg Schwerin (Germany)	0–6	(Italy) Numia Vero Volley Milano	0–3	0–3
Allianz MTV Stuttgart (Germany)	0–6	(Poland) Developres Rzeszów	1–3	0–3
Tent Obrenovac (Serbia)	0–6	(Poland) PGE Grot Budowlani Łódź	0–3	1–3

=== First leg ===
Date	Time		Score		Set 1	Set 2	Set 3	Set 4	Set 5	Total	Report
5 Feb	18:00	SSC Palmberg Schwerin (Germany)	0–3	(Italy) Numia Vero Volley Milano	14–25	23–25	16–25			53–75	Report
6 Feb	20:30	Allianz MTV Stuttgart (Germany)	1–3	(Poland) Developres Rzeszów	21–25	25–22	43–45	20–25		109–117	Report
5 Feb	19:00	Tent Obrenovac (Serbia)	0–3	(Poland) PGE Grot Budowlani Łódź	23–25	16–25	23–25			62–75	Report

=== Second leg ===
Date	Time		Score		Set 1	Set 2	Set 3	Set 4	Set 5	Total	Report
20 Feb	19:00	Numia Vero Volley Milano (Italy)	3–0	(Germany) SSC Palmberg Schwerin	25–18	25–21	26–24			76–63	Report
20 Feb	17:30	Developres Rzeszów (Poland)	3–0	(Germany) Allianz MTV Stuttgart	25–20	25–18	25–22			75–60	Report
18 Feb	18:00	PGE Grot Budowlani Łódź (Poland)	3–1	(Serbia) Tent Obrenovac	25–23	25–18	24–26	25–15		99–82	Report

== Quarterfinals ==
- The winners of the ties qualify for the final four.
- In case the teams are tied after two legs, a Golden Set is played immediately at the completion of the second leg.
- All times are local.

Team 1	Agg.	Team 2	1st leg	2nd leg	Golden Set
PGE Grot Budowlani Łódź (Poland)	0–6	(Italy) Savino Del Bene Scandicci	0–3	0–3	
Developres Rzeszów (Poland)	0–6	(Italy) A. Carraro Imoco Conegliano	0–3	0–3	
Numia Vero Volley Milano (Italy)	6–0	(Turkey) Eczacıbaşı Dynavit Istanbul	3–0	3–0	
VakıfBank Istanbul (Turkey)	3–3	(Turkey) Fenerbahçe Medicana Istanbul	0–3	3–1	15–11

=== First leg ===
Date	Time		Score		Set 1	Set 2	Set 3	Set 4	Set 5	Total	Report
5 Mar	18:00	PGE Grot Budowlani Łódź (Poland)	0–3	(Italy) Savino Del Bene Scandicci	22–25	22–25	21–25			65–75	Report
5 Mar	20:30	Developres Rzeszów (Poland)	0–3	(Italy) A. Carraro Imoco Conegliano	22–25	17–25	27–29			66–79	Report
4 Mar	20:30	Numia Vero Volley Milano (Italy)	3–0	(Turkey) Eczacıbaşı Dynavit Istanbul	25–18	25–23	25–14			75–55	Report
5 Mar	19:30	VakıfBank Istanbul (Turkey)	0–3	(Turkey) Fenerbahçe Medicana Istanbul	21–25	23–25	27–29			71–79	Report

=== Second leg ===
Date	Time		Score		Set 1	Set 2	Set 3	Set 4	Set 5	Total	Report
12 Mar	18:00	Savino Del Bene Scandicci (Italy)	3–0	(Poland) PGE Grot Budowlani Łódź	25–17	25–17	25–16			75–50	Report
12 Mar	20:30	A. Carraro Imoco Conegliano (Italy)	3–0	(Poland) Developres Rzeszów	25–18	25–19	25–22			75–59	Report
13 Mar	18:00	Eczacıbaşı Dynavit Istanbul (Turkey)	0–3	(Italy) Numia Vero Volley Milano	24–26	24–26	21–25			69–77	Report
12 Mar	18:00	Fenerbahçe Medicana Istanbul (Turkey)	1–3	(Turkey) VakıfBank Istanbul	25–19	23–25	20–25	24–26		92–95	Report
Golden set		Fenerbahçe Medicana Istanbul (Turkey)	11–15	(Turkey) VakıfBank Istanbul							

== Final four ==
- Place: Ülker Sports Arena, Istanbul.
- Time: Turkey Time (UTC+03:00).

=== Semifinals ===
Date	Time		Score		Set 1	Set 2	Set 3	Set 4	Set 5	Total	Report
3 May	16:00	Numia Vero Volley Milano (Italy)	1–3	(Italy) A. Carraro Imoco Conegliano	21–25	25–20	17–25	23–25		86–95	Report
3 May	19:00	VakıfBank Istanbul (Turkey)	0–3	(Italy) Savino Del Bene Scandicci	12–25	19–25	21–25			52–75	Report

=== 3rd place match ===
Date	Time		Score		Set 1	Set 2	Set 3	Set 4	Set 5	Total	Report
4 May	16:00	Numia Vero Volley Milano (Italy)	3–1	(Turkey) VakıfBank Istanbul	25–15	25–19	23–25	25–18		98–77	Report

=== Final ===
Date	Time		Score		Set 1	Set 2	Set 3	Set 4	Set 5	Total	Report
4 May	19:00	A. Carraro Imoco Conegliano (Italy)	3–0	(Italy) Savino Del Bene Scandicci	25–16	25–21	25–19			75–56	Report

== Final standings ==
Rank	Team
1st place, gold medalist(s)	(Italy) A. Carraro Imoco Conegliano
2nd place, silver medalist(s)	(Italy) Savino Del Bene Scandicci
3rd place, bronze medalist(s)	(Italy) Numia Vero Volley Milano
4	(Turkey) VakıfBank Istanbul

2024–25 CEV Champions League winners
(Italy)
A. Carraro Imoco Conegliano
3rd title

== See also ==
- 2024–25 CEV Champions League
- 2024–25 CEV Cup
- 2024–25 CEV Challenge Cup
- 2024–25 Women's CEV Cup
- 2024–25 CEV Women's Challenge Cup
