= Ekaterina Antropova =

Italian volleyball player (born 2003)

- Antropova playing for Eczacıbaşı in 2026

Personal information
- Nationality: Russia; Italy (since 2023)
- Born: Ekaterina Mikhailovna Antropova; 19 March 2003 (age 23) Akureyri, Iceland
- Height: 2.02 m (6 ft 7.5 in)
- Weight: 70 kg (154 lb)
- Spike: 3.35 m (132 in)
- Block: 3.05 m (120 in)

Volleyball information
- Position: Opposite
- Current club: (Turkey) Eczacıbaşı
- Number: 17 (Club) 24 (NT)

Career
- Years: Team
- 2018–2021: (Italy) Academy Sassuolo
- 2021–2026: (Italy) Savino Del Bene
- 2026 - present: (Turkey) Eczacıbaşı

National team
- Years: Team
- 2023–: Italy
Honours
Women's volleyball
Representing Italy
Olympic Games
Gold medal – first place	2024 Paris	Team
FIVB World Championship
Gold medal – first place	2025 Thailand	Team
FIVB Nations League
Gold medal – first place	2024 Bangkok	Team
Gold medal – first place	2025 Łódź	Team
Bronze medal – third place	2026 Macau	Team
European Championship
Silver medal – second place	2026 Azerbaijan-Czechia-Sweden-Turkey	Team

Ekaterina "Kate" Mikhailovna Antropova (Italian: [ekateˈriːna ˈkeit anˈtrɔːpova]; Russian: Екатерина Михайловна Антропова [jɪkətʲɪˈrʲinə ɐnˈtropəvə]; born 19 March 2003) is an Iceland-born Italian professional volleyball player. In 2022 she was named CEV Women's Challenge Cup-Most valuable player, in 2023 was named CEV Cup-Most valuable player, and in 2025 was named FIVB Volleyball Women's Club World Championship Most valuable player and best Opposite Hitter.

== Personal life ==
Antropova was born in Akureyri, Iceland to Russian parents, both of whom were athletes: her father, Mikhail Antropov, was competing in the local basketball league for Tindastóll, while her mother, Olga Antropova (née Selivanova), was a handball player.

When Ekaterina was three months old, her father signed a contract with St. Petersburg Spartak so the family returned to Russia and settled in St.Petersburg, where she spent her childhood and early adolescence. She started playing volleyball at the age of 7.

In 2017, she moved in Italy with her mother, first to Reggio Calabria and then to Sassuolo: her first affiliations were therefore with Italian sports nationality.

Following a call-up to a training camp in 2017, which she did not attend, with the Russian Under-16 national team, as noted by the European Volleyball Confederation, she was registered as Russian; meanwhile, she filed an appeal with the CAS in Lausanne for the recognition of her Italian affiliation as the first registration.

In 2023, the CAS ruling determined her nationality to be Italian, followed in the same year by the acquisition of Italian citizenship.

== Career ==
Antropova's career begins in the 2018–19 season with Academy Sassuolo, in Serie C.

in the 2020–21 season, the team is promoted in Serie A2.

In the 2021–22 season, she made her Serie A1 debut with Savino Del Bene, the club with which she won the 2021-22 Challenge Cup and the 2022-23 CEV Cup. being awarded as MVP in both cases; she also reached the playoff final for the league title in the 2023–24 season, the first for the Scandicci-based club.

Antropova continues to play in Serie A1 and CEV Champions league where her team, Savino Del Bene Volley finished second, with a 24-0 leading up to the finals where they lost 3–0 to Imoco Volley

=== National team ===
In 2017, she was called up to the Russian Under-16 team for a training camp in preparation for the European championship, but did not participate.

On August 10, 2023, after obtaining the Italian citizenship, she became eligible for the Italian national team and was called up for the European championship. In 2024, she competed at the Volleyball Nations League. She was selected for the 2024 Summer Olympics.

Once again part of Italian National Team Antropova participated in three out of four weeks in the VNL, where her team won gold and coming off the bench, scored eighteen points in the final against Brasil.

She also participated in the 2025 World FIVB World Championships where Italy won gold after beating Türkiye 3–2 in the finals. She played a big role coming off the bench in the 3–2 win in the semi-final against Brasil where she scored twenty-eight points, and fourteen in the finals against Türkiye.

== Awards ==
=== Club ===
- 2021-22 Challenge Cup
- 2022–23 CEV Cup
- 2025 FIVB Club World Championship

=== National team ===
- 2024 FIVB Women's VNL
- 2024 Olympic Games
- 2025 Nations League
- 2025 World Championship
