= Lucia Bosetti =

Italian volleyball player (born 1989)

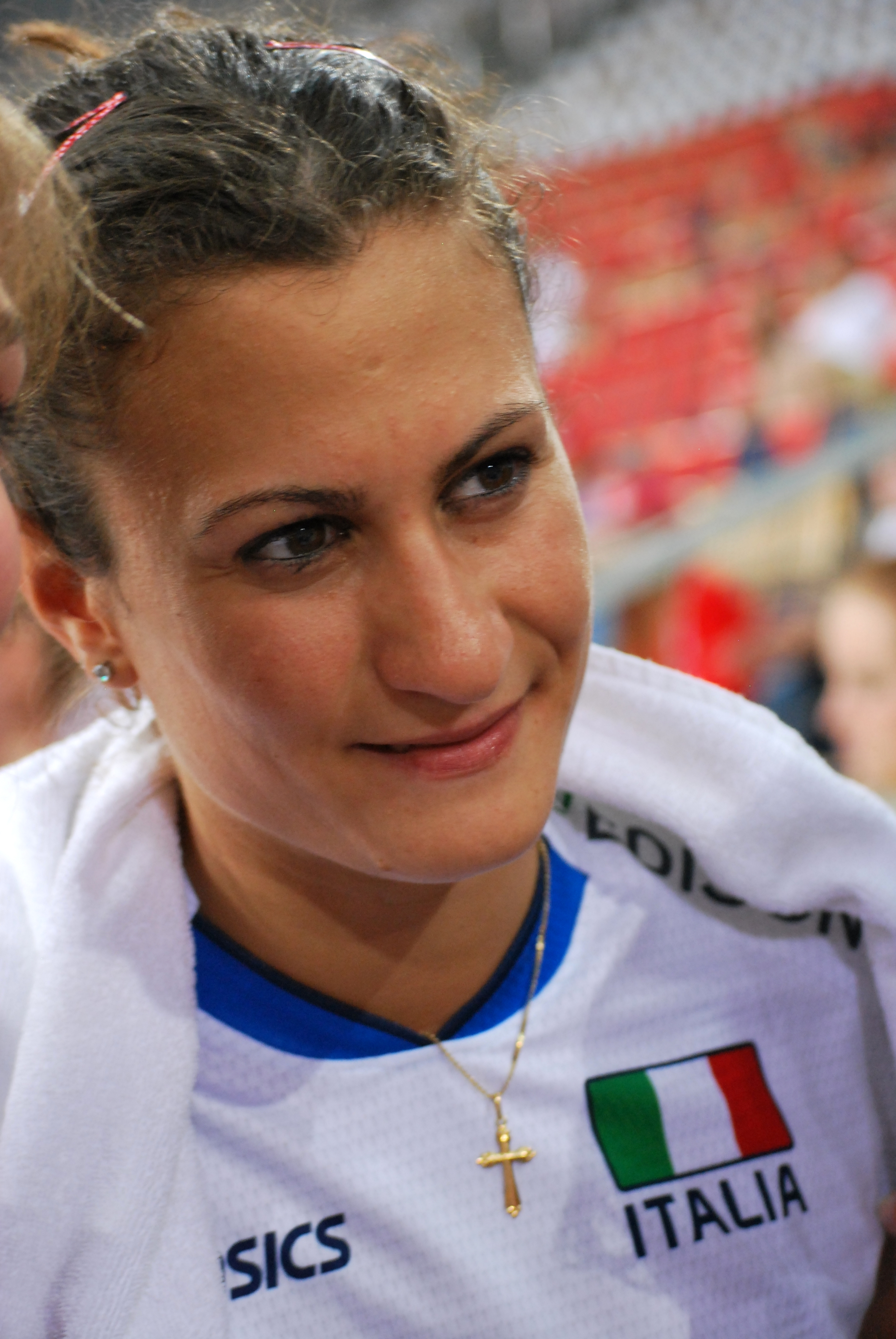
- Bosetti in 2012

Personal information
- Nationality: Italian
- Born: 9 July 1989 (age 37); Tradate, Italy
- Height: 1.78 m (5 ft 10 in)
- Weight: 61 kg (134 lb)
- Spike: 319 cm (126 in)
- Block: 225 cm (89 in)

Volleyball information
- Position: Outside hitter
- Current club: Savino Del Bene Scandicci
- Number: 16

Career
Years	Teams
2002–2007; 2007–2009; 2009–2011; 2011–2012; 2012–2014; 2014–2016; 2016–2017; 2017–	Amatori Orago; Sassuolo Volley; Volley Bergamo; Villa Cortese; River Volley Piacenza; Fenerbahçe; Pomi Casalmaggiore; Savino Del Bene Scandicci

National team
2008–	Italy
Honours
Women’s volleyball
Representing Italy
World Championship
Silver medal – second place	2018 Japan	Team
European Championship
Gold medal – first place	2009 Poland	Team
Bronze medal – third place	2019 Turkey	Team
World Grand Prix
Bronze medal – third place	2009 Yokohama
Bronze medal – third place	2010 Ningbo
Silver medal – second place	2017 Nanjing
World Cup
Gold medal – first place	2011 Japan	Team
World Grand Champions Cup
Gold medal – first place	2009 Japan	Team

Lucia Bosetti (born 9 July 1989, Tradate) is an Italian professional volleyball player. She plays for Italy women's national volleyball team.

She has competed in the 2012 Summer Olympics, and 2019 Montreux Volley Masters.

== Family ==
She is the daughter of Giuseppe Bosetti, former coach of Italy's volleyball female national team, and Franca Bardelli, who played 93 times for the latter; her sister Caterina also played for Italy's national team. She is 1.75 m (5 ft 9 in) tall.

== Awards ==
=== Club ===
- 2009–10 CEV Champions League - Champion, with Volley Bergamo
- 2010–11 Italian League - Champion, with Volley Bergamo
- 2013 Italian Supercup - Champions, with River Volley
- 2012-13 Italian Cup (Coppa Italia) - Champions, with River Volley
- 2012–13 Italian League - Champion, with River Volley
- 2013-14 Italian Cup (Coppa Italia) - Champions, with River Volley
- 2013–14 Italian League - Champion, with River Volley
- 2014-2015 Turkish Volleyball Super Cup - Champion, with Fenerbahçe Grundig
- 2014–15 Turkish Cup - Champion, with Fenerbahçe Grundig
- 2014–15 Turkish Women's Volleyball League - Champion, with Fenerbahçe Grundig
- 2015–16 CEV Women's Champions League - (bronze) Third place, with Fenerbahçe Grundig
- 2015–16 Turkish Women's Volleyball League - (silver) Runners-up, with Fenerbahçe Grundig
- 2016 FIVB Volleyball Women's Club World Championship - (silver) Runners-up, with Pomi Casalmaggiore
