= 2020–21 CEV Women's Challenge Cup =

- League: CEV Women's Challenge Cup
- Sport: Volleyball
- Duration: November 2020 – March 2021
- Teams: 44
- Finals champions: (Turkey) Yeşilyurt women's volleyball team
- Runners-up: (Romania) CSM Volei Alba Blaj

CEV Women's Challenge Cup seasons
- ← 2019–20 2021–22 →

The 2020–21 CEV Women's Challenge Cup was the 41st edition of the European Challenge Cup volleyball club tournament, the former "CEV Cup".

== Format ==
The tournament is played on a knockout format, with 32 teams participating. Initially 24 teams play a qualification round with the 12 winners advancing to the main phase. On 29 June 2018, a drawing of lots in Luxembourg City, Luxembourg, determined the team's pairing for each match. Each team plays a home and an away match with result points awarded for each leg (3 points for 3–0 or 3–1 wins, 2 points for 3–2 win, 1 point for 2–3 loss). After two legs, the team with the most result points advances to the next round. In case the teams are tied after two legs, a Golden Set is played immediately at the completion of the second leg. The Golden Set winner is the team that first obtains 15 points, provided that the points difference between the two teams is at least 2 points (thus, the Golden Set is similar to a tiebreak set in a normal match).

== Participating teams ==
The number of participants on the basis of ranking list for European Cup Competitions:

Rank	Country	Number of teams	Teams
1	Turkey		
2	Italy		
3	Russia		
5	Azerbaijan		
6	France		
7	Switzerland		
8	Romania		
9	Germany		
11	Czech Republic		
12	Slovenia		
14	Bulgaria		
15	Finland		
16	Hungary		
17	Bosnia and Herzegovina		
17	Israel		
20	Belgium		
20	Ukraine		
23	Kosovo		
25	Austria		
25	Croatia		
25	Cyprus		
25	Denmark		
25	Spain		
25	Greece		
25	Luxembourg		
25	Portugal		
25	Slovakia		
