= Enrica Merlo =

Italian volleyball player

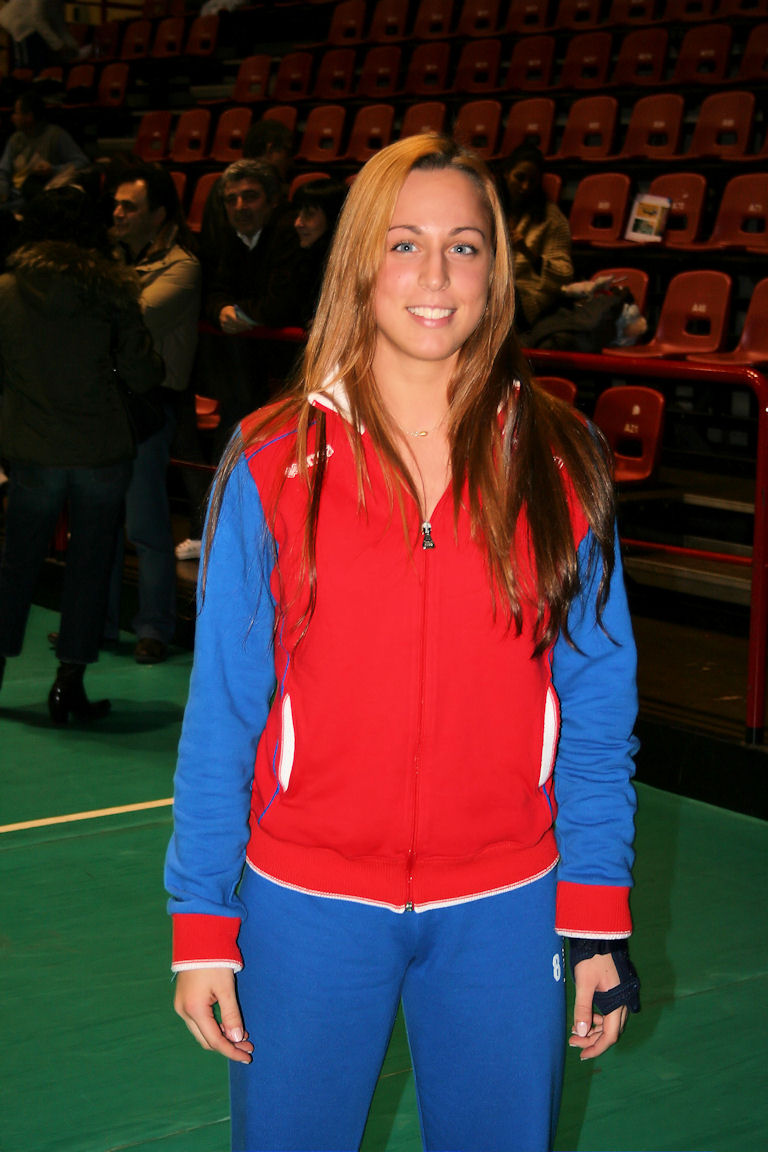

Personal information
- Nationality: Italian
- Born: 28 December 1988 (age 37); Este, Veneto, Italy
- Height: 1.70 m (5 ft 7 in)
- Weight: 60 kg (132 lb)
- Spike: 243 cm (96 in)
- Block: 233 cm (92 in)

Volleyball information
- Position: Libero
- Current club: Savino Del Bene Scandicci
- Number: 8

National team
| 2008–2014 | Italy |
- Last updated: 15 February 2017

Enrica Merlo (born 28 December 1988 in Este) is an Italian female volleyball player, playing as a libero. She has played for the Italy women's national volleyball team, notably being part of the 2009 Women's European Volleyball Championship winning team. On club level she plays for Savino Del Bene Scandicci.

== Career ==
She has won various titles, including the Italian Serie A1, Italian Cup, Italian Super Cup and twice the CEV Women's Champions League. She was selected to play the Italian League All-Star game in 2017.

== Clubs ==
- (Italy) Megius Volley Padova (2004–2006)
- (Italy) Pallavolo Reggio Emilia (2006–2007)
- (Italy) Foppapedretti Bergamo (2007–2015)
- (Italy) Savino Del Bene Scandicci (2015–present)

== Awards ==
=== Individuals ===
- 2006 Women's Junior European Volleyball Championship "Best Libero"
- 2008–09 CEV Champions League "Best Libero"
- 2009–10 CEV Champions League "Best Libero"
- 2017-18 Italian League "All-Star"

=== National team ===
==== Junior ====
- 2006 Women's Junior European Volleyball Championship – Gold medal
- 2009 Universiade – Gold medal

==== Senior ====
- 2009 European Championship – Gold medal
- 2010 FIVB World Grand Prix – Bronze medal

=== Clubs ===
- 2007–08 Italian Championship – Bronze medal, with Foppapedretti Bergamo)
- 2007–08 Italian Cup – Gold medal, with Foppapedretti Bergamo
- 2008 Italian Super Cup – Silver medal, with Foppapedretti Bergamo
- 2008–09 Italian Championship – Bronze medal, with Foppapedretti Bergamo
- 2008–09 CEV Women's Champions League – Gold medal, with Foppapedretti Bergamo
- 2009–10 Italian Championship – Bronze medal, with Foppapedretti Bergamo
- 2009–10 CEV Women's Champions League – Gold medal, with Foppapedretti Bergamo
- 2010 FIVB Volleyball Women's Club World Championship – Bronze medal, with Foppapedretti Bergamo
- 2010–11 Italian Championship – Gold medal, with Foppapedretti Bergamo
- 2011 Italian Super Cup – Gold medal, with Foppapedretti Bergamo
- 2013–14 Italian Cup – Silver medal, with Foppapedretti Bergamo
