= Vicenza Volley =

Minetti Vicenza
- Full name: Joy Volley Vicenza
- Founded: 1992
- Dissolved: 2010
- Ground: PalaRewatt, Vicenza, Italy (Capacity: 1,990)

Uniforms
Home	Away

Vicenza Volley was an Italian women's volleyball club based in Vicenza. It played in the Serie A1 from 1998 until 2009.

== Previous names ==
Due to sponsorship, the club have competed under the following names:

- Battistolli-Lattebusche Vicenza (1992–1993)
- Volley Vicenza (1993–1994)
- Barausse Vicenza (1994–1995)
- Biasia Volley Vicenza (1995–1996)
- Biasia Oyster Vicenza (1996–1997)
- Biasia Vicenza (1997–1998)
- Cosme Ceis Vicenza (1998–2000)
- Minetti Vicenza (2000–2001)
- Metodo Minetti Vicenza (2001–2002)
- Metodo Infoplus Vicenza (2002–2003)
- Minetti Infoplus Vicenza (2003–2007)
- Minetti Infoplus Imola (2007–2008)
- Minetti Vicenza (2008–2009)
- Osmo BPVi Vicenza (2009–2010)

== History ==
It was established 1992 through the merger of two smaller local clubs, Vicenza 3 and Araceli. In the same year, it acquired the rights to participate in the Serie A2 championship from Volley Noventa, a Noventa Vicentina-based volleyball club. Vicenza Volley was promoted to Serie A1 in 1998.

After winning a European CEV Cup and an Italian Super Cup in 2001, the club was relegated to Serie A2 in 2008. Vicenza Volley went bankrupt and on 26 June 2010 ceased all its activities.

== Honours ==
=== National competitions ===
- Italian Super Cup: 1

2001

=== International competitions ===
- CEV Cup: 1

2000–01
