= OK TENT =

Serbian women's volleyball club

- Full name: Odbojkaški klub TENT Obrenovac
- Founded: 1981
- Ground: JP SKC Obrenovac
- League: Serbian Women's SuperLiga
- 2024–25: 2nd
- Website: ok-tent.rs

OK TENT (Serbian: Одбојкашки клуб ТЕНТ) is a professional women's volleyball club from Obrenovac, Serbia. Founded in 1981, the club competes in the Serbian Women's SuperLiga and is one of the most successful volleyball teams in the country.

The club was established by the company Power Plants “Nikola Tesla” (TENT), one of the largest electricity producers in Serbia and the broader Balkan region. OK TENT grew into a top-tier club with a youth program and a presence in national competitions.

== Honours ==
=== National competitions ===
- National League: 2

2019-20, 2025-26

- Serbian Cup: 1

2024–25

- Serbian Super Cup: 2

2024, 2025

=== International competitions ===
- Women's CEV Cup:
  - Semi-finalists (1): 2020–21
- CEV Women's Challenge Cup:
  - Semi-finalists (1): 2021–22

== Famous players ==
- (Serbia) Nataša Krsmanović
- (Serbia) Hena Kurtagić
