= Pallavolo Scandicci =

Italian women's volleyball club

Savino Del Bene Scandicci
- Full name: Pallavolo Scandicci Savino Del Bene
- Founded: 2012; 14 years ago
- Ground: Palazzo Wanny, Florence, Italy (Capacity: 3,000-4,000)
- Chairman: Sergio Bazzurro
- Head coach: Marco Gaspari
- League: FIPAV Women's Serie A1
- 2025–26: 3rd
- Website: Club home page

Uniforms
Home	Away

Pallavolo Scandicci is an Italian professional women's volleyball club based in Scandicci that plays in the Serie A1, known also by its sponsored name Savino del Bene Scandicci. On the global stage, the club is currently champion of the FIVB Volleyball Women's Club World Championship.

== Previous names ==
Due to sponsorship, the club have competed under the following names:

- Pallavolo Scandicci (Past)
- Savino Del Bene Scandicci (2012–present)

== History ==
The club was founded in 2012, when the company Savino Del Bene, which has been investing in women's volleyball since 2009, joined the women's first team of Unione Pallavolo Scandicci. The club started in Serie B1 in the 2012–13 season, reaching promotion to Serie A2 by the end of the season. After one season in Serie A2, the club reached the highest Italian league, the Serie A1, in 2014.

In the 2017–18 season of Serie A1, Savino Del Bene Scandicci finished the regular season in second place and in the playoffs the club made it to its first semifinals.

In 2022, Savino Del Bene Scandicci won the 2021–22 CEV Challenge Cup and the following season (2022–23) the club won the CEV Cup. In the 2023–24 season of Serie A1, Savino Del Bene Scandicci played its first finals in the league playoffs and in 2025, the club reached its first final in the CEV Champions League.

== Team ==
2026–2027 Team
Number	Player	Position	Height (m)	Birth date
2	(Italy) Chidera Blessing Eze	Setter	1.81	2 September 2003 (age 23)
3	(Canada) Kiera Van Ryk	Opposite	1.89	6 January 1999 (age 27)
4	(United States) Avery Skinner	Outside Hitter	1.86	25 April 1999 (age 27)
5	(Italy) Imma Sirressi	Libero	1.75	19 May 1990 (age 36)
6	(Italy) Sofia D'Odorico	Outside Hitter	1.86	6 January 1997 (age 29)
7	(Belgium) Lise Van Hecke	Opposite	1.92	1 July 1992 (age 34)
8	(Serbia) Maja Aleksić	Middle Blocker	1.88	6 June 1997 (age 29)
9	(Italy) Caterina Bosetti	Outside Hitter	1.80	2 February 1994 (age 32)
10	(Serbia) Maja Ognjenović (c)	Setter	1.83	6 August 1984 (age 42)
11	(Italy) Martina Armini	Libero	1.75	19 September 2002 (age 24)
13	(Italy) Emma Graziani	Middle Blocker	1.93	16 August 2002 (age 24)
14	(Italy) Linda Nwakalor	Middle Blocker	1.87	17 September 2002 (age 24)
17	(Brazil) Júlia Bergmann	Outside Hitter	1.92	21 February 2001 (age 25)
22	(Italy) Sara Alberti	Middle Blocker	1.85	3 January 1993 (age 33)

2025–2026 Team
Number	Player	Position	Height (m)	Birth date
2	(Italy) Gaia Traballi	Outside Hitter	1.83	5 February 1997 (age 29)
3	(Italy) Marta Bechis	Setter	1.80	4 September 1989 (age 37)
4	(United States) Avery Skinner	Outside Hitter	1.86	25 April 1999 (age 27)
5	(Dominican Republic) Brenda Castillo	Libero	1.67	5 June 1992 (age 34)
6	(United States) Lindsey Ruddins	Opposite/Outside Hitter	1.88	5 November 1997 (age 29)
7	(United States) Sarah Franklin	Outside Hitter	1.93	27 February 2002 (age 24)
8	(Italy) Manuela Ribechi	Libero	1.72	15 February 2004 (age 22)
9	(Italy) Caterina Bosetti	Outside Hitter	1.80	2 February 1994 (age 32)
10	(Serbia) Maja Ognjenović (c)	Setter	1.83	6 August 1984 (age 42)
11	(Italy) Giulia Mancini	Middle Blocker	1.83	23 May 1998 (age 28)
13	(Italy) Emma Graziani	Middle Blocker	1.93	16 August 2002 (age 24)
14	(Italy) Linda Nwakalor	Middle Blocker	1.87	17 September 2002 (age 24)
17	(Italy) Ekaterina Antropova	Opposite	2.02	19 March 2003 (age 23)
21	(Germany) Camilla Weitzel	Middle Blocker	1.95	11 June 2000 (age 26)
~~23~~	(Italy) ~~Giulia Gennari~~ (Note: Giulia Gennari left the team on 29 December 2025.)	~~Setter~~	~~1.84~~	~~23 June 1996 (age 30)~~

2024–2025 Team
Number	Player	Position	Height (m)	Birth date
3	(Italy) Manuela Ribechi (Note: Manuela Ribechi joined the team on 17 December 2024.)	Libero	1.72	15 February 2004 (age 22)
4	(Belgium) Britt Herbots (c)	Outside Hitter	1.82	24 September 1999 (age 27)
5	(Dominican Republic) Brenda Castillo	Libero	1.67	5 June 1992 (age 34)
6	(United States) Lindsey Ruddins	Outside Hitter/Opposite	1.88	5 November 1997 (age 29)
7	(Russia) Anna Kotikova	Outside Hitter	1.87	13 October 1999 (age 27)
8	(Italy) Giulia Mancini (Note: Giulia Mancini joined the team on 17 December 2024.)	Middle Blocker	1.83	23 May 1998 (age 28)
~~9~~	(Italy) ~~Francesca Villani~~ (Note: Francesca Villani left the team on 25 September 2024.)	~~Outside Hitter~~	~~1.87~~	~~30 May 1995 (age 31)~~
10	(Serbia) Maja Ognjenović	Setter	1.83	6 August 1984 (age 42)
11	(Italy) Beatrice Parrocchiale	Libero	1.67	26 December 1995 (age 30)
12	(United States) Kara Bajema	Outside Hitter	1.88	24 March 1998 (age 28)
13	(Italy) Emma Graziani	Middle Blocker	1.90	16 August 2002 (age 24)
14	(Italy) Linda Nwakalor	Middle Blocker	1.87	17 September 2002 (age 24)
15	(Brazil) Ana Carolina Da Silva	Middle Blocker	1.83	8 April 1991 (age 35)
~~16~~	(Netherlands) ~~Indy Baijens~~ (Note: Indy Baijens left the team on 17 December 2024.)	~~Middle Blocker~~	~~1.93~~	~~4 February 2001 (age 25)~~
17	(Italy) Ekaterina Antropova	Opposite	2.02	19 March 2003 (age 23)
18	(Italy) Camilla Mingardi	Outside Hitter	1.86	19 October 1997 (age 29)
21	(Mexico) Argentina Ung (Note: Argentina Ung joined the team on 24 January 2025.)	Setter	1.81	25 April 2002 (age 24)
23	(Italy) Giulia Gennari	Setter	1.84	23 June 1996 (age 30)

2023–2024 Team
Number	Player	Position	Height (m)	Birth date
2	(Italy) Sara Alberti	Middle Blocker	1.85	3 January 1993 (age 33)
3	(Belgium) Britt Herbots	Outside Hitter	1.82	24 September 1999 (age 27)
4	(China) Zhu Ting	Outside Hitter	1.98	29 November 1994 (age 31)
6	(United States) Lindsey Ruddins	Outside Hitter	1.88	5 November 1997 (age 29)
7	(Italy) Isabella Di Iulio (c)	Setter	1.75	26 November 1991 (age 34)
8	(Italy) Enrica Merlo	Libero	1.70	28 December 1988 (age 37)
9	(Italy) Francesca Villani	Outside Hitter	1.87	30 May 1995 (age 31)
10	(Serbia) Maja Ognjenović	Setter	1.83	6 August 1984 (age 42)
11	(Italy) Beatrice Parrocchiale (Note: Beatrice Parrocchiale joined the team on 7 November 2023.)	Libero	1.67	26 December 1995 (age 30)
13	(Italy) Martina Armini	Libero	1.75	19 September 2002 (age 24)
14	(Italy) Linda Nwakalor	Middle Blocker	1.87	17 September 2002 (age 24)
15	(United States) Haleigh Washington	Middle Blocker	1.92	22 September 1995 (age 31)
16	(Brazil) Ana Carolina Da Silva	Middle Blocker	1.83	8 April 1991 (age 35)
17	(Italy) Ekaterina Antropova	Opposite	2.02	19 March 2003 (age 23)
18	(Italy) Binto Diop	Opposite	1.94	2 March 2002 (age 24)
19	(Poland) Pola Nowakowska (Note: Pola Nowakowska joined the team on 22 March 2024.)	Outside Hitter	1.81	30 January 1996 (age 30)
~~20~~	(Italy) ~~Alice Gay~~ (Note: Alice Gay left the team on 7 November 2023.)	~~Libero~~	~~1.65~~	~~24 January 2002 (age 24)~~

2022–2023 Team
Number	Player	Position	Height (m)	Birth date
1	(Italy) Indrė Sorokaitė	Outside Hitter	1.88	2 July 1988 (age 38)
2	(Italy) Sara Alberti	Middle Blocker	1.85	3 January 1993 (age 33)
3	(Netherlands) Yvon Beliën	Middle Blocker	1.88	28 December 1993 (age 32)
4	(China) Zhu Ting	Outside Hitter	1.98	29 November 1994 (age 31)
~~5~~	(Italy) ~~Ofelia Malinov~~ (Note: Ofelia Malinov left the team on 12 January 2023.)	~~Setter~~	~~1.85~~	~~29 February 1996 (age 30)~~
6	(Italy) Nicole Gamba	Libero	1.71	2 June 1998 (age 28)
7	(Italy) Elena Pietrini	Outside Hitter	1.86	17 March 2000 (age 26)
8	(Italy) Enrica Merlo (c)	Libero	1.70	28 December 1988 (age 37)
9	(Italy) Camilla Mingardi	Outside Hitter	1.86	19 October 1997 (age 29)
10	(China) Yao Di (Note: Yao Di joined the team on 13 January 2023.)	Setter	1.82	15 August 1992 (age 34)
11	(Russia) Yana Shcherban	Outside Hitter	1.85	6 September 1989 (age 37)
12	(Italy) Veronica Angeloni	Outside Hitter	1.86	6 July 1986 (age 40)
13	(Italy) Ludovica Guidi	Middle Blocker	1.86	17 December 1992 (age 33)
15	(United States) Haleigh Washington	Middle Blocker	1.92	22 September 1995 (age 31)
17	(Italy) Ekaterina Antropova	Opposite	2.02	19 March 2003 (age 23)
28	(Dominican Republic) Brenda Castillo	Libero	1.67	5 June 1992 (age 34)
77	(Italy) Isabella Di Iulio	Setter	1.75	26 November 1991 (age 34)

2021–2022 Team
Number	Player	Position	Height (m)	Birth date
1	(Italy) Veronica Angeloni	Outside Hitter	1.86	6 July 1986 (age 40)
2	(Italy) Sara Alberti	Middle Blocker	1.85	3 January 1993 (age 33)
3	(Brazil) Ana Beatriz Corrêa	Middle Blocker	1.90	7 February 1992 (age 34)
4	(Italy) Noemi Moschettini (Note: Noemi Moschettini joined the team on 26 December 2021.)	Setter	1.85	27 May 2003 (age 23)
5	(Italy) Ofelia Malinov (c)	Setter	1.85	29 February 1996 (age 30)
6	(Italy) Francesca Napodano	Libero	1.75	17 January 1999 (age 27)
7	(Italy) Elena Pietrini	Outside Hitter	1.86	17 March 2000 (age 26)
8	(Italy) Enrica Merlo	Libero	1.70	28 December 1988 (age 37)
9	(Italy) Marina Lubian	Middle Blocker	1.92	11 April 2000 (age 26)
10	(Brazil) Natália Pereira	Outside Hitter	1.85	4 April 1989 (age 37)
11	(Germany) Louisa Lippmann	Opposite	1.91	23 September 1994 (age 32)
~~12~~	(Germany) ~~Hanna Orthmann~~ (Note: Hanna Orthmann left the team on 17 January 2022.)	~~Outside Hitter~~	~~1.88~~	~~3 October 1998 (age 28)~~
~~13~~	(Bulgaria) ~~Nikol Milanova~~ (Note: Nikol Milanova left the team on 16 December 2021.)	~~Setter~~	~~1.91~~	~~10 August 2002 (age 24)~~
16	(Italy) Benedetta Bartolini	Middle Blocker	1.84	5 March 1999 (age 27)
17	(Italy) Ekaterina Antropova	Opposite	2.02	19 March 2003 (age 23)
18	(Italy) Letizia Camera	Setter	1.75	1 October 1992 (age 34)
19	(Italy) Indrė Sorokaitė (Note: Indrė Sorokaitė joined the team on 17 January 2022.)	Outside Hitter	1.88	2 July 1988 (age 38)
24	(Dominican Republic) Brenda Castillo	Libero	1.67	5 June 1992 (age 34)

2020–2021 Team
Number	Player	Position	Height (m)	Birth date
3	(Poland) Magdalena Stysiak	Opposite	2.03	3 December 2000 (age 25)
4	(Italy) Ofelia Malinov (c)	Setter	1.85	29 February 1996 (age 30)
5	(Serbia) Mina Popović	Middle Blocker	1.87	16 September 1994 (age 32)
6	(Austria) Srna Marković	Outside Hitter	1.84	6 June 1996 (age 30)
7	(Italy) Elena Pietrini	Outside Hitter	1.86	17 March 2000 (age 26)
8	(Italy) Enrica Merlo	Libero	1.70	28 December 1988 (age 37)
9	(Italy) Marina Lubian	Middle Blocker	1.92	11 April 2000 (age 26)
10	(Italy) Luna Carocci	Libero	1.74	10 July 1988 (age 38)
11	(Italy) Agnese Cecconello	Middle Blocker	1.90	6 November 1999 (age 27)
12	(Croatia) Martina Šamadan	Middle Blocker	1.93	11 September 1993 (age 33)
13	(Germany) Kimberly Drewniok	Opposite	1.88	11 August 1997 (age 29)
14	(Bulgaria) Elitsa Vasileva (Note: Elitsa Vasileva joined the team on 6 December 2020.)	Outside Hitter	1.94	13 May 1990 (age 36)
16	(Italy) Lucia Bosetti	Outside Hitter	1.75	9 July 1989 (age 37)
17	(United States) Megan Courtney	Outside Hitter	1.85	27 October 1993 (age 33)
18	(Italy) Letizia Camera	Setter	1.75	1 October 1992 (age 34)

2019–2020 Team
Number	Player	Position	Height (m)	Birth date
1	(Italy) Giulia Carraro	Setter	1.75	25 July 1994 (age 32)
2	(Mexico) Samantha Bricio	Outside Hitter	1.88	22 November 1994 (age 31)
3	(Poland) Magdalena Stysiak	Opposite	2.03	3 December 2000 (age 25)
4	(Italy) Ofelia Malinov (c)	Setter	1.85	29 February 1996 (age 30)
~~5~~	(Brazil) ~~Adenízia da Silva~~ (Note: Adenízia da Silva left the team on 17 January 2020.)	~~Middle Blocker~~	~~1.87~~	~~18 December 1986 (age 39)~~
6	(Poland) Agnieszka Korneluk	Middle Blocker	1.98	17 October 1994 (age 32)
7	(Italy) Elena Pietrini	Outside Hitter	1.86	17 March 2000 (age 26)
8	(Italy) Enrica Merlo	Libero	1.70	28 December 1988 (age 37)
9	(Italy) Marina Lubian	Middle Blocker	1.92	11 April 2000 (age 26)
10	(Netherlands) Lonneke Slöetjes	Opposite	1.92	15 November 1990 (age 35)
11	(Italy) Paola Cardullo	Libero	1.62	18 March 1982 (age 44)
12	(Italy) Beatrice Molinaro	Middle Blocker	1.90	15 June 1995 (age 31)
14	(Canada) Alexa Gray (Note: Alexa Gray joined the team on 16 January 2020.)	Outside Hitter	1.85	7 August 1994 (age 32)
15	(Serbia) Jovana Stevanović	Middle Blocker	1.91	30 June 1992 (age 34)
16	(Italy) Lucia Bosetti	Outside Hitter	1.75	9 July 1989 (age 37)
18	(Italy) Dayana Kosareva (Note: Dayana Kosareva joined the team at the end of January 2020.)	Outside Hitter	1.86	24 August 1999 (age 27)
~~19~~	(Serbia) ~~Bojana Milenković~~ (Note: Bojana Milenković left the team on 30 January 2020.)	~~Outside Hitter~~	~~1.85~~	~~6 March 1997 (age 29)~~

2018–2019 Team
Number	Player	Position	Height (m)	Birth date
1	(Italy) Federica Mastrodicasa	Middle Blocker	1.82	5 February 1988 (age 38)
3	(Italy) Veronica Bisconti	Libero	1.74	27 January 1991 (age 35)
4	(Italy) Ofelia Malinov	Setter	1.85	29 February 1996 (age 30)
5	(Brazil) Adenízia da Silva	Middle Blocker	1.87	18 December 1986 (age 39)
~~6~~	(United States) ~~Regan Hood~~ (Note: Regan Hood left the team on 31 December 2018.)	~~Outside Hitter~~	~~1.88~~	~~10 August 1983 (age 43)~~
7	(United States) Annie Mitchem	Outside Hitter	1.92	22 April 1994 (age 32)
8	(Italy) Enrica Merlo	Libero	1.70	28 December 1988 (age 37)
9	(Italy) Valeria Papa	Outside Hitter	1.83	9 September 1989 (age 37)
11	(Sweden) Isabelle Haak	Opposite	1.94	11 July 1999 (age 27)
12	(Italy) Alessia Mazzaro	Middle Blocker	1.85	19 September 1998 (age 28)
13	(Italy) Valentina Zago	Opposite	1.87	21 February 1990 (age 36)
14	(Italy) Valeria Caracuta	Setter	1.73	14 December 1987 (age 38)
15	(Serbia) Jovana Stevanović	Middle Blocker	1.91	30 June 1992 (age 34)
16	(Italy) Lucia Bosetti (c)	Outside Hitter	1.75	9 July 1989 (age 37)
18	(Bulgaria) Elitsa Vasileva	Outside Hitter	1.94	13 May 1990 (age 36)
19	(Serbia) Bojana Milenković	Outside Hitter	1.85	6 March 1997 (age 29)
20	(Russia) Tatiana Kosheleva (Note: Tatiana Kosheleva joined the team on 8 April 2019.)	Outside Hitter	1.91	23 December 1988 (age 37)

2017–2018 Team
Number	Player	Position	Height (m)	Birth date
1	(United States) Lauren Carlini	Setter	1.85	28 February 1995 (age 31)
3	(Azerbaijan) Yelyzaveta Ruban	Outside Hitter	1.85	3 March 1995 (age 31)
4	(Italy) Marika Bianchini	Outside Hitter	1.78	23 April 1993 (age 33)
5	(Brazil) Adenízia da Silva	Middle Blocker	1.87	18 December 1986 (age 39)
7	(Italy) Isabella Di Iulio	Setter	1.75	26 November 1991 (age 34)
8	(Italy) Enrica Merlo	Libero	1.70	28 December 1988 (age 37)
9	(Italy) Valeria Papa	Outside Hitter	1.83	9 September 1989 (age 37)
10	(Italy) Giulia Mancini	Middle Blocker	1.83	23 May 1998 (age 28)
11	(Sweden) Isabelle Haak	Opposite	1.94	11 July 1999 (age 27)
13	(Italy) Valentina Arrighetti (c)	Middle Blocker	1.89	26 January 1985 (age 41)
16	(Italy) Lucia Bosetti	Outside Hitter	1.75	9 July 1989 (age 37)
17	(Italy) Martina Ferrara	Libero	1.68	28 January 1999 (age 27)
18	(Dominican Republic) Bethania De La Cruz	Outside Hitter	1.90	13 May 1989 (age 37)

== Current coaching staff ==
Coaching staff for the 2025–2026 season:

Italy	Marco Gaspari	20 September 1982 (age 44)	Head coach
Hungary	Sándor Kántor	1 February 1971 (age 55)	Coach assistant
Italy	Mattia Cozzi	29 November 1994 (age 31)	Coach assistant
Italy	Marco Sesia		Athletic trainer
Italy	Simone Maurilli		Scoutman

== Head coaches ==
Period	Head coach
2013–2014	(Italy) Marco Botti
2014–2016	(Italy) Massimo Bellano
2016–2017	(Italy) Mauro Chiappafreddo
2017–2017	(Italy) Alessandro Beltrami
2017–2019	(Italy) Carlo Parisi
2019–2020	(Italy) Marco Mencarelli
2020–2020	(Italy) Luca Cristofani
2020–2024	(Italy) Massimo Barbolini
2024–2024	(France) Stéphane Antiga
2024–	(Italy) Marco Gaspari

== Position main (current season) ==
Scandicci Line up
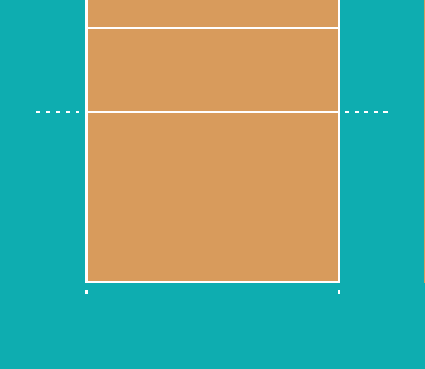

== Notable players ==
- (Netherlands) Judith Pietersen (2015–2016)
- (Turkey) Bahar Toksoy (2015–2016)
- (Netherlands) Floortje Meijners (2016–2017)
- (Brazil) Adenízia da Silva (2016–2020)
- (Sweden) Isabelle Haak (2017–2019)
- (Serbia) Jovana Stevanović (2018–2020)
- (Russia) Tatiana Kosheleva (2019)
- (Netherlands) Lonneke Slöetjes (2019–2020)
- (Mexico) Samantha Bricio (2019–2020)
- (Poland) Agnieszka Kąkolewska (2019–2020)
- (Poland) Magdalena Stysiak (2019–2021)
- (Serbia) Mina Popović (2020–2021)
- (Brazil) Natalia Pereira (2021–2022)
- (Brazil) Ana Beatriz Corrêa (2021–2022)
- (Germany) Louisa Lippmann (2021–2022)
- (Dominican Republic) Brenda Castillo (2021–2023, 2024–2026)
- (China) Yao Di (2022–2023)
- (Netherlands) Yvon Beliën (2022–2023)
- (Russia) Yana Shcherban (2022–2023)
- (United States) Haleigh Washington (2022–2024)
- (China) Zhu Ting (2022–2024)
- (Brazil) Ana Carolina Da Silva (2023–2025)
- (Belgium) Britt Herbots (2023–2025)
- (Serbia) Maja Ognjenović (2023–)

== Titles and honours ==
=== International competitions ===
- FIVB Volleyball Women's Club World Championship
  - Champions (1x): 2025
- CEV Cup
  - Champions (1x): 2022–23
- CEV Challenge Cup
  - Champions (1x): 2021–22

== European record ==
On 12 April 2023, in the home game of the final match of the 2023 CEV Cup, Savino Del Bene Scandicci made the record of the best score in a CEV Cup final (women's) since the Rally Point System was adopted, with only 41 points lost. Savino Del Bene Scandicci – CSM Volei Alba Blaj 3–0 (25-18, 25-12, 25-11). This is also the record of the best score in all European cups' finals.
