= CEV Women's Challenge Cup =

European volleyball competition (1980–2007)

CEV Challenge Cup
- Current season, competition or edition: 2025–26 CEV Women's Challenge Cup
- Formerly: CEV Women's Cup (1980–2007)
- Sport: Volleyball
- Founded: 1980; 46 years ago
- Administrator: CEV
- No. of teams: 32 (Main phase)
- Country: CEV members
- Continent: Europe
- Most recent champions: (Italy) Megabox Vallefoglia (1st title)
- Most titles: (Italy) PV Reggio Emilia (Germany) USC Münster (3 titles)
- Website: Official website

The CEV Women's Challenge Cup, formerly (from 1980 to 2007) known as CEV Women's Cup is the third official competition for women's volleyball clubs of Europe and takes place every year. It is organized by the Confédération Européenne de Volleyball (CEV) and was created as CEV Women's Cup in 1980 to allow more clubs to participate in European competitions. In 2007, it was renamed CEV Challenge Cup following a CEV decision to rename its second official competition (known as Top Teams Cup) to CEV Cup.

== Results summary ==
=== CEV Cup ===
Season	Winners	Result	Runners-up	Third place
1980–81	(West Germany) SV Lohhof		(Italy) Mobili Cecina	(West Germany) VC Wiesbaden
1981–82	(West Germany) USC Münster		(Italy) Lions Baby Ancona	(Netherlands) Orbis Orion
1982–83	(West Germany) SG JDZ Feuerbach		(Italy) Pallavolo Cecina	(West Germany) TG Rüsselsheim
1983–84	(Italy) Victoria Vill. Bari		(Italy) VIC Modena	(West Germany) SG JDZ Feuerbach
1984–85	(West Germany) Viktoria Augsburg		(Italy) Victoria Vill. Bari	(Italy) Parma Lynx
1985–86	(Italy) Nelson Reggio Emilia		(West Germany) SG JDZ Feuerbach	(Socialist Federal Republic of Yugoslavia) Crvena Zvezda Beograd
1986–87	(Italy) Civ e Civ Modena		(West Germany) USC Münster	(Italy) Yoghi Ancona
1987–88	(Italy) Yoghi Ancona	3–2	(Italy) Braglia Ceramica Reggio Emilia	(Turkey) Emlakbank Ankara
1988–89	(Italy) Braglia Ceramica Reggio Emilia	3–0	(Czechoslovakia) Slavia Praha	(West Germany) 1. VC Schwerte
1989–90	(Soviet Union) Orbita Zaporizhzhia	3–1	(Germany) Bayern Lohhof	(Romania) Rapid Bucarest
1990–91	(Italy) Pescopagano Matera	3–0	(Italy) Braglia Ceramica Reggio Emilia	(Turkey) Vakıfbank Ankara
1991–92	(Italy) Pescopagano Matera	3–0	(Italy) AS Volley Modena	(Turkey) Vakıfbank Ankara
1992–93	(Italy) Colli Aniene Rome	3–1	(Turkey) Eczacıbaşı Istanbul	(Russia) Yunesis Ekaterinburg
1993–94	(Germany) USC Münster	3–1	(Italy) Impresem Agrigento	(Ukraine) Iskra Luhansk
1994–95	(Italy) Ecoclear Sumirago	3–0	(Ukraine) Orbita Zaporizhzhia	(France) RCF Villebon
1995–96	(Germany) USC Münster	3–1	(Turkey) Emlakbank Ankara	(Russia) Rossy Moscow
1996–97	(Italy) Alpam Roma	3–2	(Italy) Romanelli Firenze	(Turkey) Galatasaray
1997–98	(Italy) Cermagica Reggio Emilia	3–0	(Italy) Medinex Reggio Calabria	(France) PTT Mulhouse
1998–99	(Italy) Centro Ester Napoli	3–0	(Ukraine) Iskra Luhansk	(Russia) Uraltransbank Ekaterinburg
1999–00	(Italy) Medinex Reggio Calabria	3–1	(Italy) Vicenza Volley	(Turkey) Vakıfbank Güneş Sigorta Istanbul
2000–01	(Italy) Cividini Vicenza	3–0	(Italy) Foppapedretti Bergamo	(Italy) Pallavolo Sirio Perugia
2001–02	(Italy) Edison Volley Modena	3–1	(Italy) Marine Consulting Ravenna	(Russia) Balakovskaia Balakovo
2002–03	(Italy) Asystel Volley Novara	3–0	(Spain) Hotel Cantur Las Palmas	(Italy) Pallavolo Sirio Perugia
2003–04	(Italy) Foppapedretti Bergamo	3–2	(Italy) Vini Monteschiavo Jesi	(Spain) Caja de Ávila
2004–05	(Italy) Pallavolo Sirio Perugia	3–0	(Russia) Balakovskaia AES Balakovo	(Italy) Vini Monteschiavo Jesi
2005–06	(Italy) Scavolini Pesaro	3–1	(Italy) Bigmat Kerakoll Chieri	(Spain) Universidad Burgos
2006–07	(Italy) Pallavolo Sirio Perugia	3–0	(Russia) Zarechie Odintsovo	(Italy) Sant'Orsola Asystel Novara

=== CEV Challenge Cup ===
Season	Winners	Result	Runners-up	Third place
2007–08	(Turkey) VakıfBank Güneş Istanbul	3–2	(Italy) Infoplus Minetti Imola	(Germany) Dresdner SC
2008–09	(Italy) Vini Monteschiavo Jesi	3–0	(Greece) Panathinaikos Athens	(Russia) Leningradka Saint Petersburg
2009–10	(Germany) Dresdner SC	3–1	(Belgium) Asterix Kieldrecht	(Turkey) Galatasaray
2010–11	(Azerbaijan) Azerrail Baku	3–1, 3–1	(Azerbaijan) Lokomotiv Baku	(Azerbaijan) Igtisadchi Baku (Russia) Uralochka-NTMK Ekaterinburg
2011–12	(Azerbaijan) Lokomotiv Baku	2–3, 3–2 (GS 15–13)	(Azerbaijan) VC Baku	(Belgium) VDK Gent Dames (Germany) VfB Suhl
2012–13	(Russia) Dinamo Krasnodar	3–2, 1–3 (GS 15–8)	(Italy) Rebecchi Nordmeccanica Piacenza	(Germany) VT Aurubis Hamburg (Finland) LP Viesti Salo
2013–14	(Russia) Zarechie Odintsovo	3–2, 3–1	(Turkey) Beşiktaş	(France) ASPTT Mulhouse (Poland) Impel Wrocław
2014–15	(Turkey) Bursa BBSK	0–3, 3–1 (GS 15–11)	(Russia) Uralochka-NTMK Ekaterinburg	(Germany) Schweriner SC (Ukraine) Khimik Yuzhny
2015–16	(Romania) CSM București	3–1, 3–1	(Turkey) Trabzon İdmanocağı	(Turkey) Bursa BBSK (Russia) Zarechie Odintsovo
2016–17	(Turkey) Bursa BBSK	2–3, 3–0	(Greece) Olympiacos Piraeus	(Germany) Schweriner SC (Russia) Yenisey Krasnoyarsk
2017–18	(Greece) Olympiacos Piraeus	2–3, 3–1	(Turkey) Bursa BBSK	(Russia) Dinamo Krasnodar (France) Nantes VB
2018–19	(Italy) Saugella Monza	3–0, 3–1	(Turkey) Aydın Büyükşehir Belediyespor	(France) Le Cannet-Rocheville (Slovenia) Gen-I Volley Nova Gorica
2019–20	Cancelled due to the COVID-19 pandemic			
2020–21	(Turkey) Yeşilyurt Istanbul	3–0, 3–0	(Romania) CSM Volei Alba Blaj	(Turkey) THY Istanbul (Hungary) MCM Kaposvári
2021–22	(Italy) Scandicci	3–0, 3–0	(Spain) La Laguna	(Turkey) Aydın (Serbia) Obrenovac
2022–23	(Italy) Chieri '76	3–0, 3–0	(Romania) CSM Lugoj	(Germany) Suhl (Serbia) ŽOK Jedinstvo Stara Pazova
2023–24	(Italy) Igor Gorgonzola Novara	3–0, 3–1	(France) Neptunes Nantes	(Germany) VC Wiesbaden (Turkey) Bursa Nilüfer Belediye
2024–25	(Italy) Roma Volley	3–2, 3–1	(Italy) Chieri '76	(Turkey) Galatasaray (Germany) Potsdam
2025–26	(Italy) Megabox Vallefoglia	3–2, 3–0	(Greece) Panathinaikos	(Greece) Panionios (Hungary) Kaposvári

Note: The third place match was abolished in 2010. The table's column "Third place" display the losing semifinalists from the 2010–11 season onwards.

== Titles by club ==
Rank	Club	Titles	Runners-up	Champion Years
1	(Italy) Pallavolo Reggio Emilia	3	2	1985–86, 1988–89, 1997–98
2	(Germany) USC Münster	3	1	1981–82, 1993–94, 1995–96
3	(Italy) Volley Modena	2	2	1986–87, 2001–02
4	(Turkey) Bursa BBSK	2	1	2014–15, 2016–17
5	(Italy) Pallavolo Matera	2		1990–91, 1991–92
5	(Italy) Gierre Roma	2		1992–93, 1996–97
5	(Italy) Pallavolo Sirio Perugia	2		2004–05, 2006–07
5	(Italy) Igor Gorgonzola Novara	2		2002–03, 2023–24
9	(Italy) Vicenza Volley	1	2	2000–01
10	(West Germany) SV Lohhof	1	1	1980–81
10	(West Germany) CJD Feuerbach	1	1	1982–83
10	(Italy) Amatori Volley Bari	1	1	1983–84
10	(Soviet Union) (Ukraine) Orbita Zaporizhzhia	1	1	1989–90
10	(Italy) Virtus Reggio Calabria	1	1	1999–00
10	(Italy) Volley Bergamo	1	1	2003–04
10	(Italy) Vini Monteschiavo Jesi	1	1	2008–09
10	(Azerbaijan) Lokomotiv Baku	1	1	2011–12
10	(Russia) VC Zarechie Odintsovo	1	1	2013–14
10	(Greece) Olympiacos Piraeus	1	1	2017–18
10	(Italy) Chieri '76	1	1	2022–23
21	(West Germany) TG Viktoria Augsburg	1		1984–85
21	(Italy) Brogliaccio Pallavolo Ancona	1		1987–88
21	(Italy) Pallavolo Sumirago	1		1994–95
21	(Italy) Centro Ester Pallavolo	1		1998–99
21	(Italy) Scavolini Pesaro	1		2005–06
21	(Turkey) Vakıfbank Sports Club	1		2007–08
21	(Germany) Dresdner SC	1		2009–10
21	(Azerbaijan) Azerrail Baku	1		2010–11
21	(Russia) VC Dinamo Krasnodar	1		2012–13
21	(Romania) CSM București	1		2015–16
21	(Italy) Saugella Monza	1		2018–19
21	(Turkey) Yeşilyurt Istanbul	1		2020–21
21	(Italy) Scandicci	1		2021–22
21	(Italy) Roma Volley	1		2024–25
21	(Italy) Megabox Vallefoglia	1		2025–26

== Titles by country ==
Notes:

1. For the purpose of keeping historical event accuracy, historical countries names are used in this table.

Rank	Country	Won	Runners-up	Total
1	Italy	27	19	46
2	Turkey	4	6	10
3	West Germany	4	2	6
4	Germany	3	1	4
5	Russia	2	3	5
6	Azerbaijan	2	2	4
7	Greece	1	3	4
8	Romania	1	2	3
9	Soviet Union	1	–	1
10	Spain	–	2	2
10	Ukraine	–	2	2
12	Belgium	–	1	1
12	Czechoslovakia	–	1	1
12	France	–	1	1

== MVP by edition ==
- 2000–01 – Małgorzata Glinka (POL)
- 2001–02 –
- 2002–03 – Cristina Pîrv (ROM)
- 2003–04 – Lyubov Sokolova (RUS)
- 2004–05 – Dorota Świeniewicz (POL)
- 2005–06 – Simona Rinieri (ITA)
- 2006–07 – Simona Gioli (ITA)
- 2007–08 – Aysun Özbek (TUR)
- 2008–09 – Simona Rinieri (ITA)
- 2009–10 – Saskia Hippe (GER)
- 2010–11 – Polina Rahimova (AZE)
- 2011–12 – Nancy Metcalf (USA)
- 2012–13 – Marina Maryukhnich (UKR)
- 2013–14 – Natalia Malykh (RUS)
- 2014–15 – Meryem Boz (TUR)
- 2015–16 – Jelena Blagojević (SRB)
- 2016–17 – Özge Kirdar (TUR)
- 2017–18 – Stella Christodoulou (GRE)
- 2018–19 – Anne Buijs (NED)
- 2019–20 – event cancelled due to pandemic
- 2020–21 – Alexia Căruțașu (ROM)
- 2021–22 – Ekaterina Antropova (ITA)
- 2022–23 –
- 2023–24 – Vita Akimova (RUS)
- 2024–25 – Anna Adelusi (ITA)
- 2025–26 – Erblira Bici (ALB)

== All-time team records ==
Winners and finalists by city since 1980/1981

Location	Winners	Finalists
Reggio Emilia (Italy)	3	2
Münster (Germany)	3	1
Istanbul (Turkey)	2	2
Baku (Azerbaijan)	2	2
Modena (Italy)	2	2
Bursa (Turkey)	2	1
Perugia (Italy)	2	0
Matera (Italy)	2	0
Roma (Italy)	2	0
Novara (Italy)	2	0
Vicenza (Italy)	1	2
Ancona (Italy)	1	1
Feuerbach (Germany)	1	1
Jesi (Italy)	1	1
Bari (Italy)	1	1
Bergamo (Italy)	1	1
Odintsovo (Russia)	1	1
Reggio di Calabria (Italy)	1	1
Unterschleißheim (Germany)	1	1
Zaporizhzhia (Ukraine)	1	1
Bucuresti (Romania)	1	0
Dresden (Germany)	1	0
Augsburg (Germany)	1	0
Krasnodar (Russia)	1	0
Monza (Italy)	1	0
Napoli (Italy)	1	0
Pesaro (Italy)	1	0
Sumirago (Italy)	1	0
Cerro Veronese (Italy)		2
Ankara (Turkey)		1
Yekaterinburg (Russia)		1
Balakovo (Russia)		1
Luhansk (Ukraine)		1
Agrigento (Italy)		1
Athínai (Greece)		1
Aydin (Turkey)		1
Beveren (Belgium)		1
Blaj (Romania)		1
Chieri (Italy)		1
Florence (Italy)		1
Las Palmas de Gran Canaria (Spain)		1
Piacenza (Italy)		1
Praha (Czech Republic)		1
Ravenna (Italy)		1
Trabzon (Turkey)		1
Nantes (France)		1
Ávila (Spain)		
Belgrade (Serbia)		
Burgos (Spain)		
Doetinchem (Netherlands)		
Moscow (Russia)		
Mulhouse (France)		
Parma (Italy)		
Rüsselsheim (Germany)		
Saint Petersburg (Russia)		
Schwerte (Germany)		
Villebon-Sur-Yvette (France)		
Wiesbaden (Germany)		

Various statistics since 2006/2007

Number of appearances
1	ASKÖ Linz-Steg	10
2	Kanti Schaffhausen	10
3	Olympiacos Piraeus	10
4	VK Slavia Bratislava	10
5	Královo Pole Brno	9
6	Sliedrecht Sport	9
7	Vasas Budapest	9
8	AEL Limassol	8
9	Asterix Avo Beveren	7
10	CK Ponta Delgada	7

Number of matches
1	Olympiacos Piraeus	50
2	Bursa BBSK	42
3	Asterix Avo Beveren	38
4	Kanti Schaffhausen	38
5	Královo Pole Brno	34
6	Volero Le Cannet	34
7	Calcit Volleyball Kamnik	32
8	Vasas Budapest	30
9	VK Slavia Bratislava	30
10	Lokomotiv Baku	28

Wins
1	Olympiacos Piraeus	35
2	Bursa BBSK	34
3	Asterix Avo Beveren	25
4	Dresdner SC	23
5	Zarechie Odintsovo	21
6	Azerrail Baku	20
7	Kanti Schaffhausen	20
8	Lokomotiv Baku	20
9	Volero Le Cannet	20
10	Schweriner SC	18

Number of wins in games played
1	Pieralisi Jesi	100 %
2	Sirio Perugia	100 %
3	Yesilyurt SK	100 %
4	Nordmeccanica Piacenza	90 %
5	Saugella Team Monza	90 %
6	Béziers	88 %
7	Dresdner SC	88 %
8	Zarechie Odintsovo	88 %
9	Baku VK	86 %
10	Panathinaikos Athens	86 %

(Based on W=2 pts and D=1 pts)

	Team	S	Firs	Best	Pts	MP	W	L	GF	GA	diff
1	Olympiacos Piraeus (GRE)	10	2008/2009	1st	85	50	35	15	113	71	+42
2	Bursa BBSK (TUR)	5	2013/2014	1st	76	42	34	8	109	37	+72
3	Asterix Avo Beveren (BEL)	7	2008/2009	2nd	63	38	25	13	85	60	+25
4	Kanti Schaffhausen (SWI)	10	2006/2007	-	58	38	20	18	70	67	+3
5	Volero Le Cannet (FRA)	6	2008/2009	-	54	34	20	14	74	52	+22
6	Královo Pole Brno (CZE)	9	2008/2009	-	50	34	16	18	57	69	-12
7	Dresdner SC (GER)	3	2008/2009	1st	49	26	23	3	72	17	+55
8	Lokomotiv Baku (AZE)	3	2009/2010	1st	48	28	20	8	73	31	+42
9	Azerrail Baku (AZE)	5	2008/2009	1st	46	26	20	6	64	27	+37
10	Calcit Volleyball Kamnik (SLO)	7	2009/2010	-	46	32	14	18	55	66	-11
11	Zarechie Odintsovo (RUS)	3	2006/2007	1st	45	24	21	3	65	19	+46
12	Neuchâtel Université (SWI)	6	2013/2014	-	45	28	17	11	58	44	+14
13	Vasas Budapest (HUN)	9	2008/2009	-	43	30	13	17	55	63	-8
14	VK Slavia Bratislava (SVK)	10	2008/2009	-	43	30	13	17	44	64	-20
15	CSM Bucuresti (ROM)	4	2012/2013	1st	41	24	17	7	53	29	+24
16	VDK Gent Dames (BEL)	5	2010/2011	-	41	26	15	11	51	42	+9
17	Sliedrecht Sport (NED)	9	2009/2010	-	41	28	13	15	46	55	-9
18	Schweriner SC (GER)	3	2010/2011	-	40	22	18	4	57	21	+36
19	Impel Wroclaw (POL)	3	2009/2010	4th	40	24	16	8	59	32	+27
20	Khimik Yuzhny Odesa (UKR)	4	2010/2011	-	39	24	15	9	52	31	+21
21	Minchanka Minsk (BLR)	6	2008/2009	-	39	24	15	9	53	36	+17
22	Hapoel Kfar Saba (ISR)	7	2011/2012	-	39	28	11	17	44	54	-10
23	Ilbank SK Ankara (TUR)	3	2011/2012	-	37	22	15	7	48	26	+22
24	Uralochka NTMK Ekaterinburg (RUS)	2	2010/2011	2nd	36	20	16	4	54	15	+39
25	Hermes Oostende (BEL)	7	2009/2010	-	36	24	12	12	38	43	-5
26	ASKÖ Linz-Steg (AUT)	10	2008/2009	-	35	26	9	17	35	58	-23
27	Dinamo Krasnodar (RUS)	2	2012/2013	1st	33	18	15	3	48	19	+29
28	LP Viesti Salo (FIN)	4	2008/2009	-	33	22	11	11	41	43	-2
29	ZOK Jedinstvo Brcko (BIH)	7	2008/2009	-	33	24	9	15	36	49	-13
30	AEL Limassol (CYP)	8	2008/2009	-	33	24	9	15	32	46	-14
31	Sm'Aesch Pfeffingen (SWI)	6	2010/2011	-	32	22	10	12	37	44	-7
32	CSU Târgu Mures (ROM)	5	2008/2009	-	31	20	11	9	40	36	+4
33	Charleroi Volley (BEL)	5	2010/2011	-	31	20	11	9	38	34	+4
34	Stod Volley Steinkjer (NOR)	4	2012/2013	-	30	20	10	10	33	39	-6
35	Rote Raben Vilsbiburg (GER)	3	2009/2010	-	29	18	11	7	40	24	+16
36	Doprastav Bratislava (SVK)	6	2008/2009	-	29	20	9	11	32	36	-4
37	Igtisadchi Baku (AZE)	3	2008/2009	-	27	16	11	5	33	20	+13
38	THY SK Istanbul (TUR)	2	2019/2020	-	26	14	12	2	40	7	+33
39	Baku VK (AZE)	1	2011/2012	2nd	26	14	12	2	40	9	+31
40	Panathinaikos Athens (GRE)	3	2008/2009	2nd	26	14	12	2	36	11	+25
41	Besiktas Istanbul (TUR)	2	2013/2014	2nd	26	16	10	6	35	20	+15
42	Apollon Limassol (CYP)	6	2009/2010	-	26	19	7	12	22	44	-22
43	VT Aurubis Hamburg (GER)	2	2012/2013	-	25	14	11	3	34	16	+18
44	TJ Ostrava (CZE)	4	2016/2017	-	25	15	10	5	34	18	+16
45	GEN-I Volley Nova Gorica (SLO)	3	2006/2007	-	25	16	9	7	38	23	+15
46	VC Unic LPS Piatra-Neamt (ROM)	4	2006/2007	-	25	16	9	7	33	29	+4
47	AO Thiras Santorini (GRE)	2	2018/2019	-	24	14	10	4	35	16	+19
48	Volley Köniz (SWI)	4	2006/2007	-	24	14	10	4	32	18	+14
49	Severodonchanka Severodonetsk (UKR)	4	2006/2007	-	24	16	8	8	28	24	+4
50	Markopoulo AO (GRE)	3	2008/2009	-	24	16	8	8	29	27	+2
51	Stiinta Bacau (ROM)	5	2009/2010	-	23	16	7	9	27	33	-6
52	Trabzon Idman Ocagi (TUR)	1	2015/2016	2nd	22	12	10	2	32	9	+23
53	Nova Branik Maribor (SLO)	5	2008/2009	-	22	16	6	10	22	37	-15
54	Yenisei Krasnoyarsk (RUS)	2	2016/2017	-	21	12	9	3	30	13	+17
55	Mulhouse ASPTT (FRA)	3	2013/2014	-	21	14	7	7	27	24	+3
56	Istres Ouest Provence (FRA)	3	2008/2009	-	21	14	7	7	27	27	0
57	Pieralisi Jesi (ITA)	1	2008/2009	1st	20	10	10	0	30	1	+29
58	Nantes Volley-Ball (FRA)	2	2015/2016	-	20	12	8	4	26	15	+11
59	Universidad Burgos (SPA)	2	2006/2007	4th	20	12	8	4	26	16	+10
60	VC Weert (NED)	5	2009/2010	-	20	14	6	8	26	28	-2
61	Nordmeccanica Piacenza (ITA)	1	2012/2013	2nd	19	10	9	1	29	7	+22
62	Saugella Team Monza (ITA)	1	2018/2019	1st	19	10	9	1	29	9	+20
63	SF Paris St-Cloud (FRA)	2	2013/2014	-	19	12	7	5	28	23	+5
64	SK UP Olomouc (CZE)	5	2008/2009	-	19	14	5	9	21	29	-8
65	OrPo Orivesi (FIN)	5	2009/2010	-	19	14	5	9	19	31	-12
66	Galatasaray Istanbul (TUR)	1	2009/2010	3rd	18	10	8	2	28	7	+21
67	Leningradka Saint-Petersburg (RUS)	1	2008/2009	3rd	18	10	8	2	26	10	+16
68	Omichka Omsk (RUS)	2	2010/2011	-	18	10	8	2	24	12	+12
69	CV Logroño (SPA)	3	2015/2016	-	18	12	6	6	24	20	+4
70	VFM Franches-Montagnes (SWI)	4	2011/2012	-	18	14	4	10	19	31	-12
71	CK Ponta Delgada (POR)	7	2009/2010	-	18	14	4	10	17	31	-14
72	UVC Graz (AUT)	7	2012/2013	-	18	15	3	12	18	37	-19
73	VfB 91 Suhl (GER)	1	2011/2012	-	17	10	7	3	23	12	+11
74	Aydin Büyüksehir Bld Spor (TUR)	2	2018/2019	2nd	17	10	7	3	23	16	+7
75	Ladies in Black Aachen (GER)	2	2018/2019	-	17	10	7	3	22	15	+7
76	Békéscsabai RSE (HUN)	2	2014/2015	-	17	10	7	3	23	17	+6
77	TEVA Gödöllöi RC (HUN)	4	2012/2013	-	17	12	5	7	20	25	-5
78	Dinamo Bucarest (ROM)	5	2006/2007	-	17	14	3	11	15	35	-20
79	CV Las Palmas (SPA)	2	2017/2018	-	16	9	7	2	24	14	+10
80	Kuusamon Pallo-Karhut (FIN)	3	2017/2018	-	16	12	4	8	20	26	-6
81	Pannaxiakos Naxos (GRE)	3	2014/2015	-	16	12	4	8	15	26	-11
82	Béziers (FRA)	2	2015/2016	-	15	8	7	1	21	7	+14
83	Wiesbaden VC (GER)	2	2010/2011	-	15	10	5	5	19	20	-1
84	Jedinstvo Stara Pazova (SCG)	3	2014/2015	-	15	10	5	5	17	18	-1
85	HAOK Mladost Zagreb (CRO)	5	2009/2010	-	15	12	3	9	13	28	-15
86	Alba Blaj CSV (ROM)	1	2020/2021	2nd	14	8	6	2	18	7	+11
87	Albacete (SPA)	1	2008/2009	4th	14	8	6	2	20	15	+5
88	RSR Walferdange (LUX)	6	2013/2014	-	14	12	2	10	10	31	-21
89	OK Porec (CRO)	4	2013/2014	-	14	12	2	10	9	32	-23
90	Tent Obrenovac (SCG)	5	2009/2010	-	13	10	3	7	13	21	-8
91	Yesilyurt SK (TUR)	1	2020/2021	1st	12	6	6	0	18	4	+14
92	Sirio Perugia (ITA)	1	2006/2007	1st	12	6	6	0	18	5	+13
93	Telekom Baku (AZE)	1	2008/2009	-	12	8	4	4	17	12	+5
94	Dukla Liberec (CZE)	2	2018/2019	-	12	8	4	4	17	15	+2
95	CSKA Sofia (BUL)	2	2008/2009	-	12	8	4	4	17	16	+1
96	Oxidoc Palma de Mallorca (SPA)	1	2010/2011	-	12	8	4	4	14	14	0
97	VV Alterno Apeldoorn (NED)	2	2013/2014	-	12	8	4	4	14	15	-1
98	Partizan Vizura Beograd (SCG)	3	2010/2011	-	12	8	4	4	13	15	-2
99	VB Niederösterreich Sokol/Post SV (AUT)	6	2009/2010	-	12	10	2	8	13	27	-14
100	AVC Famalicao / Leica (POR)	4	2015/2016	-	12	10	2	8	9	24	-15
101	ZOK Rijeka (CRO)	3	2010/2011	-	12	10	2	8	11	27	-16
102	Anorthosis Famagusta (CYP)	6	2008/2009	-	12	12	0	12	4	36	-32
103	Asystel Novara (ITA)	1	2006/2007	3rd	11	6	5	1	17	6	+11
104	Strabag VC Bratislava (SVK)	3	2016/2017	-	11	8	3	5	10	16	-6
105	Maccabi XT Haifa (ISR)	4	2011/2012	-	11	10	1	9	7	29	-22
106	Levski Siconco Sofia (BUL)	5	2009/2010	-	11	10	1	9	5	27	-22
107	Spartak Subotica (SCG)	1	2009/2010	-	10	6	4	2	14	9	+5
108	Katrineholms VK (SWE)	1	2011/2012	-	10	6	4	2	13	8	+5
109	Samorodok Khabarovsk (RUS)	1	2009/2010	-	10	6	4	2	12	7	+5
110	Kommunalnik Mogilev (BLR)	2	2008/2009	-	10	6	4	2	13	11	+2
111	Kolubara Lazarevac (SCG)	1	2012/2013	-	10	6	4	2	12	10	+2
112	NRK Nyíregyháza (HUN)	2	2008/2009	-	10	8	2	6	15	20	-5
113	AEK Athens (GRE)	4	2012/2013	-	10	8	2	6	11	19	-8
114	Kangasala LP (FIN)	3	2013/2014	-	10	8	2	6	7	18	-11
115	TI-P Innsbruck (AUT)	3	2013/2014	-	10	8	2	6	8	21	-13
116	IG Novara Trecate (ITA)	1	2014/2015	-	9	6	3	3	13	9	+4
117	Albi (FRA)	1	2008/2009	-	9	6	3	3	10	9	+1
118	CSM Târgoviste (ROM)	2	2015/2016	-	9	6	3	3	11	12	-1
119	CV Haris La Laguna Tenerife (SPA)	4	2016/2017	-	9	7	2	5	9	19	-10
120	Orbita Zaporizhzhia (UKR)	2	2014/2015	-	8	6	2	4	8	12	-4
-	OK Spodnja Savinjska Sempeter (SLO)	2	2012/2013	-	8	6	2	4	8	12	-4
-	1.MCM-Diamant Kaposvári (HUN)	3	2019/2020	-	8	6	2	4	8	12	-4
123	Évreux (FRA)	2	2010/2011	-	8	6	2	4	7	12	-5
124	ZOK Vukovar (CRO)	2	2008/2009	-	8	6	2	4	8	14	-6
125	Iraklis Thessaloniki (GRE)	2	2009/2010	-	8	6	2	4	6	13	-7
126	Sparkasse Klagenfurt (AUT)	4	2008/2009	-	8	8	0	8	2	24	-22
-	VC Oudegem (BEL)	4	2012/2013	-	8	8	0	8	2	24	-22
128	ZOK Gacko (BIH)	5	2013/2014	-	8	8	0	8	0	24	-24
129	UKF Nitra (SVK)	2	2020/2021	-	7	4	3	1	9	3	+6
130	Universal Modena (ITA)	1	2012/2013	-	7	4	3	1	10	5	+5
131	Nilüfer Belediyespor Bursa (TUR)	2	2011/2012	-	7	4	3	1	9	4	+5
132	Raanana VBC (ISR)	1	2009/2010	-	7	4	3	1	9	5	+4
133	ZOK Pivovara Osijek (CRO)	2	2008/2009	-	7	6	1	5	8	17	-9
134	UTE Budapest (HUN)	3	2011/2012	-	7	6	1	5	7	16	-9
135	Çanakkale Belediyespor (TUR)	1	2016/2017	-	6	4	2	2	10	6	+4
136	WoVo Rovaniemi (FIN)	1	2015/2016	-	6	4	2	2	8	6	+2
137	LiigaPloki Pihtipudas (FIN)	1	2018/2019	-	6	4	2	2	8	7	+1
138	VK Senica (SVK)	1	2010/2011	-	6	4	2	2	8	8	0
139	Lokomotiv Kaliningrad (RUS)	1	2006/2007	-	6	4	2	2	6	8	-2
-	OK Marina Kastela (CRO)	2	2016/2017	-	6	4	2	2	6	8	-2
-	TS Volley Düdingen (SWI)	1	2014/2015	-	6	4	2	2	6	8	-2
-	Eurosped - TVT Almelo (NED)	1	2015/2016	-	6	4	2	2	6	8	-2
143	CSM Lugoj (ROM)	3	2019/2020	-	6	5	1	4	5	12	-7
144	Engelholm VS (SWE)	3	2010/2011	-	6	6	0	6	4	18	-14
145	CS Madeira (POR)	3	2008/2009	-	6	6	0	6	2	18	-16
-	Holte IF (DEN)	4	2017/2018	-	6	6	0	6	2	18	-16
-	Luka Bar (MNE)	3	2008/2009	-	6	6	0	6	2	18	-16
148	Tirana Volley (ALB)	3	2008/2009	-	6	6	0	6	1	18	-17
149	ZOK Split 1700 (CRO)	3	2009/2010	-	6	6	0	6	0	18	-18
150	TK Kaunas (LTU)	2	2020/2021	-	5	3	2	1	6	3	+3
-	AJM FC Porto (POR)	1	2020/2021	-	5	3	2	1	6	3	+3
-	Vardar Skopje (MKD)	1	2020/2021	-	5	3	2	1	6	3	+3
153	VC Beroe Stara Zagora (BUL)	1	2018/2019	-	5	4	1	3	6	9	-3
154	Pila PTPS (POL)	1	2006/2007	-	5	4	1	3	5	9	-4
155	VV Peelpush Meijel (NED)	1	2012/2013	-	5	4	1	3	6	11	-5
156	Stella E.S. Calais (FRA)	1	2009/2010	-	5	4	1	3	4	9	-5
-	Volley Lugano (SWI)	1	2019/2020	-	5	4	1	3	4	9	-5
158	PSvBG Salzburg (AUT)	2	2016/2017	-	5	4	1	3	5	11	-6
159	Ribeirense Pico Azores (POR)	1	2011/2012	-	5	4	1	3	4	10	-6
160	Bialystok (POL)	1	2012/2013	-	5	4	1	3	3	9	-6
-	BSK Istanbul (TUR)	1	2019/2020	-	5	4	1	3	3	9	-6
162	VC Sneek (NED)	2	2014/2015	-	5	4	1	3	4	11	-7
163	Hämeenlinna HPK (FIN)	2	2015/2016	-	5	4	1	3	3	10	-7
164	Vital Ljubljana (SLO)	2	2009/2010	-	4	4	0	4	3	12	-9
-	CVB Barça Barcelona (SPA)	2	2014/2015	-	4	4	0	4	3	12	-9
166	Maritza Plovdiv (BUL)	2	2010/2011	-	4	4	0	4	2	12	-10
-	RVS Riga (LAT)	3	2019/2020	-	4	4	0	4	2	12	-10
168	Radnicki Beograd (SCG)	2	2008/2009	-	4	4	0	4	1	12	-11
-	TSV Hartberg (AUT)	2	2010/2011	-	4	4	0	4	1	12	-11
-	KV Skënderaj (KOS)	2	2015/2016	-	4	4	0	4	1	12	-11
171	CV CCO 7 Palmas Gran Canaria (SPA)	2	2018/2019	-	4	4	0	4	0	12	-12
-	VC Tirol Innsbruck (AUT)	2	2011/2012	-	4	4	0	4	0	12	-12
-	Randaberg IL (NOR)	2	2016/2017	-	4	4	0	4	0	12	-12
-	KV Kastrioti Ferizaj (KOS)	2	2017/2018	-	4	4	0	4	0	12	-12
175	SCMU Craiova (ROM)	1	2010/2011	-	3	2	1	1	4	3	+1
176	VK Kúpele Brusno (SVK)	2	2020/2021	-	3	2	1	1	5	5	0
177	PVK Olymp Praha (CZE)	1	2019/2020	-	3	2	1	1	4	4	0
-	OK Formis (SLO)	1	2018/2019	-	3	2	1	1	4	4	0
179	USC Münster (GER)	1	2012/2013	-	3	2	1	1	3	3	0
-	Türk Telekom Ankara (TUR)	1	2006/2007	-	3	2	1	1	3	3	0
-	VK Prostejov (CZE)	1	2020/2021	-	3	2	1	1	3	3	0
182	Tenerife (SPA)	1	2009/2010	-	3	2	1	1	4	5	-1
-	Voléro Zürich (SWI)	1	2009/2010	-	3	2	1	1	4	5	-1
-	Proton Volleyball Club Balakovo (RUS)	1	2018/2019	-	3	2	1	1	4	5	-1
-	Topvolley Antwerpen (BEL)	1	2018/2019	-	3	2	1	1	4	5	-1
186	Ciutadella Menorca (SPA)	1	2011/2012	-	3	2	1	1	3	4	-1
-	Zlatogor Zolotonosha Cherkasy (UKR)	1	2008/2009	-	3	2	1	1	3	4	-1
-	Zeljeznicar Lajkovac (SCG)	1	2017/2018	-	3	2	1	1	3	4	-1
-	Kohila VK (EST)	1	2015/2016	-	3	2	1	1	3	4	-1
-	LP Vampula Huittinen (FIN)	1	2019/2020	-	3	2	1	1	3	4	-1
191	Vandoeuvre-Nancy (FRA)	1	2020/2021	-	3	2	1	1	3	5	-2
-	VV Pollux Oldenzaal (NED)	1	2008/2009	-	3	2	1	1	3	5	-2
-	Aris Salonique (GRE)	1	2018/2019	-	3	2	1	1	3	5	-2
-	OPE Rethymno (GRE)	1	2013/2014	-	3	2	1	1	3	5	-2
195	Dinamo Pancevo (SCG)	1	2010/2011	-	2	2	0	2	4	6	-2
-	Jászberényi RK (HUN)	1	2018/2019	-	2	2	0	2	4	6	-2
197	Zoersel GHA (BEL)	1	2017/2018	-	2	2	0	2	3	6	-3
-	TVC Amstelveen (NED)	1	2010/2011	-	2	2	0	2	3	6	-3
-	VBC Galina (LIE)	1	2017/2018	-	2	2	0	2	3	6	-3
200	AMVJ Amstelveen (NED)	1	2006/2007	-	2	2	0	2	2	6	-4
-	Imzit Dobrinja Sarajevo (BIH)	1	2008/2009	-	2	2	0	2	2	6	-4
-	Konecranes Hämeenlinna (FIN)	1	2008/2009	-	2	2	0	2	2	6	-4
-	Galeb Bar (MNE)	1	2010/2011	-	2	2	0	2	2	6	-4
-	ZOK Braslovce (SLO)	1	2014/2015	-	2	2	0	2	2	6	-4
205	Clube Desportivo Ribeirense (POR)	1	2009/2010	-	2	2	0	2	1	6	-5
-	Volksbank Velika Gorica (CRO)	1	2009/2010	-	2	2	0	2	1	6	-5
-	VC Dornbirn (AUT)	1	2009/2010	-	2	2	0	2	1	6	-5
-	TPV Novo Mesto (SLO)	1	2008/2009	-	2	2	0	2	1	6	-5
-	Forza Skopje (MKD)	1	2008/2009	-	2	2	0	2	1	6	-5
-	UiS Stavanger (NOR)	1	2010/2011	-	2	2	0	2	1	6	-5
-	TED Ankara Kolejliler (TUR)	1	2012/2013	-	2	2	0	2	1	6	-5
-	Panellinios AC Athens (GRE)	1	2006/2007	-	2	2	0	2	1	6	-5
-	UVT Agroland Timisoara (ROM)	1	2018/2019	-	2	2	0	2	1	6	-5
214	Tongeren VC (BEL)	1	2008/2009	-	2	2	0	2	0	6	-6
-	DYO Karsiyaka Izmir (TUR)	1	2008/2009	-	2	2	0	2	0	6	-6
-	Krug Cherkasy (UKR)	1	2008/2009	-	2	2	0	2	0	6	-6
-	OTP Banka Pula (CRO)	1	2008/2009	-	2	2	0	2	0	6	-6
-	Jinestra Odesa (UKR)	1	2011/2012	-	2	2	0	2	0	6	-6
-	AEK Larnaca (CYP)	1	2008/2009	-	2	2	0	2	0	6	-6
-	Volei 2004 Constanta (ROM)	1	2013/2014	-	2	2	0	2	0	6	-6
-	SK ZU Zilina (SVK)	1	2009/2010	-	2	2	0	2	0	6	-6
-	Troon Prestwick & Ayr (SCO)	1	2008/2009	-	2	2	0	2	0	6	-6
-	Paola Hibs (MLT)	1	2010/2011	-	2	2	0	2	0	6	-6
-	Kula Gradacac (BIH)	1	2010/2011	-	2	2	0	2	0	6	-6
-	Minatori Rreshen (ALB)	1	2012/2013	-	2	2	0	2	0	6	-6
-	Lindesberg Volley (SWE)	1	2012/2013	-	2	2	0	2	0	6	-6
-	VBC Cheseaux (SWI)	2	2020/2021	-	2	2	0	2	0	6	-6
-	Gaziantep SB (TUR)	1	2006/2007	-	2	2	0	2	0	6	-6
-	SG Prinz Brunnenbau Volleys Perg (AUT)	1	2018/2019	-	2	2	0	2	0	6	-6
-	VTC Pezinok (SVK)	1	2019/2020	-	2	2	0	2	0	6	-6
-	VC Mamer (LUX)	1	2013/2014	-	2	2	0	2	0	6	-6
-	Porfyras Volley (GRE)	1	2019/2020	-	2	2	0	2	0	6	-6
-	KV Drita Gjilan (KOS)	1	2019/2020	-	2	2	0	2	0	6	-6
-	CHEV Diekirch (LUX)	1	2018/2019	-	2	2	0	2	0	6	-6
-	OK Kastela (CRO)	2	2020/2021	-	2	2	0	2	0	6	-6
-	SC Prometey Kamyanske (UKR)	1	2019/2020	-	2	2	0	2	0	6	-6
237	Palac Bydgoszcz (POL)	1	2010/2011	-	1	1	0	1	0	3	-3
238	TV Fischbek (GER)	1	2013/2014	-	0	0	0	0	0	0	0
