= VC Baku =

Azerbaijani volleyball club

- Full name: Volleyball Club Baku
- Founded: 2010
- Ground: Sarhadchi Sport Olympic Center; Baku, Azerbaijan (Capacity: 1,000)
- Chairman: (Azerbaijan) Anar Mammadov
- Manager: (Brazil) Angelo Vergesi
- League: Azerbaijan Women's Volleyball Super League
- 2010-2011: 6th
- Website: Club home page

VC Baku is an Azerbaijani women's volleyball club.

== History ==
VC Baku women volleyball team was founded in 2010. VC Baku participated at Azerbaijan Women's Volleyball Super League 2010-2011 season and finished 6th. The team will enter CEV Challenge Cup this season.
