= 2021–22 CEV Women's Challenge Cup =

- League: CEV Women's Challenge Cup
- Sport: Volleyball
- Duration: November 2021 – 23 March 2022
- Teams: 44
- Finals champions: (Italy) Scandicci
- Runners-up: (Spain) La Laguna

CEV Women's Challenge Cup seasons
- ← 2020–21 2022–23 →

The 2021–22 CEV Women's Challenge Cup was the 42nd edition of the European Challenge Cup volleyball club tournament, the former "CEV Cup".

== Format ==
The tournament is played on a knockout format, with 32 teams participating. Initially 24 teams play a qualification round with the 12 winners advancing to the main phase. On 29 June 2018, a drawing of lots in Luxembourg City, Luxembourg, determined the team's pairing for each match. Each team plays a home and an away match with result points awarded for each leg (3 points for 3–0 or 3–1 wins, 2 points for 3–2 win, 1 point for 2–3 loss). After two legs, the team with the most result points advances to the next round. In case the teams are tied after two legs, a Golden Set is played immediately at the completion of the second leg. The Golden Set winner is the team that first obtains 15 points, provided that the points difference between the two teams is at least 2 points (thus, the Golden Set is similar to a tiebreak set in a normal match).

== Participating teams ==
The number of participants on the basis of ranking list for European Cup Competitions:

Rank	Country	Number of teams	Teams
1	Turkey		
2	Italy		
5	Azerbaijan		
6	France		
7	Switzerland		
8	Romania		
9	Germany		
11	Czech Republic		
12	Slovenia		
14	Bulgaria		
15	Finland		
16	Hungary		
17	Bosnia and Herzegovina		
17	Israel		
20	Belgium		
20	Ukraine		
23	Kosovo		
25	Austria		
25	Croatia		
25	Cyprus		
25	Denmark		
25	Spain		
25	Greece	2	Panathinaikos, Voula|
25	Luxembourg		
25	Portugal		
25	Slovakia		

== Bracket ==
2nd Round
(Israel) Kfar Saba	3	3
(Latvia) Rigas	0	1
(Croatia) Kaštela	3	3
(Cyprus) Limassol	1	2
(Austria) Linz-Steg	3	0
(Switzerland) Cheseaux	2	3
(Switzerland) Schaffhausen	3	0
(Czech Republic) Ostrava	2	3
(Netherlands) Sliedrecht	1	2
(Belgium) Oostende	3	3
(Bosnia and Herzegovina) Mostar	0	0
(Lithuania) Kaunas	3	3
(Turkey) Aydın	3	3
(Norway) Tromsø	0	0
(Austria) Niederösterreich	3	3
(Luxembourg) Walferdange	0	0
(Slovakia) Brusno	0	0
(Romania) Lugoj	3	3
(Slovakia) Bratislava	0	0
(Greece) Voula	3	3
(Portugal) Ponta Delgada	3	3
(Denmark) Holte	0	0

16th Finals
(Israel) Kfar Saba	3	3
(Slovenia) Ljubljana	0	0
(Croatia) Kaštela	1	1
(Romania) Medgidia	3	3
(Serbia) Obrenovac	3	3
(Croatia) Marina Kaštela	1	0
(Switzerland) Cheseaux	2	0
(Czech Republic) Brno	3	3
(Czech Republic) Ostrava	3	0
(Greece) Panathinaikos	2	3
(Belgium) Oostende	0	3
(Belgium) Genk	3	0
(Netherlands) Borne	2	1
(Spain) La Laguna	3	3
(Lithuania) Kaunas	1	0
(Turkey) Nilüfer	3	3
(Turkey) Aydın	3	3
(Bosnia and Herzegovina) Gacko	0	0
(Israel) Hadera	0	1
(Hungary) Kaposvar	3	3
(Austria) Niederösterreich	3	3
(Austria) Graz	0	0
(Romania) Lugoj	3	3
(Switzerland) Pfeffingen	2	1
(Greece) Voula	0	0
(Italy) Scandicci	3	3
(Portugal) Ponta Delgada	0	0
(Germany) Potsdam	3	3
(Bulgaria) Kazanlak	3	1
(Slovakia) Nitra	0	3
(Portugal) Aves	0	0
(France) Cannes	3	3

8th Finals
(Israel) Kfar Saba	0	0
(Romania) Medgidia	3	3
(Serbia) Obrenovac	3	3
(Czech Republic) Brno	2	0
(Greece) Panathinaikos	3	2
(Belgium) Oostende	0	3
(Spain) La Laguna	3	3
(Turkey) Nilüfer	2	1
(Turkey) Aydın	3	3
(Hungary) Kaposvar	0	0
(Austria) Niederösterreich	0	0
(Romania) Lugoj	3	3
(Italy) Scandicci	3	3
(Germany) Potsdam	1	0
(Slovakia) Nitra	0	1
(France) Cannes	3	3

4th Finals
(Romania) Medgidia	1	0
(Serbia) Obrenovac	3	3
(Greece) Panathinaikos	2	0
(Spain) La Laguna	3	3
(Turkey) Aydın	3	3
(Romania) Lugoj	2	2
(Italy) Scandicci	3	3
(France) Cannes	1	0

Semifinals
(Serbia) Obrenovac	1	0
(Spain) La Laguna	3	3
(Turkey) Aydın	2	0
(Italy) Scandicci	3	3

Finals
(Spain) La Laguna	0	0
(Italy) Scandicci	3	3

_

== Qualification phase ==
=== 2nd round ===
Team 1	Agg.	Team 2	1st leg	2nd leg
BK Tromsø (Norway)	0–6	(Turkey) Aydın Büyükşehir Belediyespor	0–3	0–3
RSR Walferdange (Luxembourg)	0–6	(Austria) Niederösterreich Sokol/Post	0–3	1–3
AEL Limassol (Cyprus)	4–2	(Croatia) OK Kaštela	2–3	3–0
TJ Ostrava (Czech Republic)	6–0	(Switzerland) VC Kanti Schaffhausen	3–0	3–0
CSM Lugoj (Romania)	5–1	(Slovakia) VK Pirane Brusno	3–0	3–2
Athens ASP Thetis Voula (Greece)	6–0	(Slovakia) VKP Bratislava	3–0	3–0
Kairos Ponta Delgada (Portugal)	6–0	(Denmark) Holte IF	3–0	3–0
Hapoel Kfar Saba (Israel)	6–0	(Latvia) Rigas Volejbola Skola	3–0	3–1
SOK Mostar (Bosnia and Herzegovina)	2–4	(Lithuania) TK Kaunas VDU	0–3	3–2
Steelvolleys Linz-Steg (Austria)	2–4	(Switzerland) VBC Cheseaux	3–2	0–3
Sliedrecht Sport (Netherlands)	0–6	(Belgium) Hermes Rekkenshop Oostende	1–3	0–3

==== First leg ====
Date	Time		Score		Set 1	Set 2	Set 3	Set 4	Set 5	Total	Report
2 Nov	19:00	Aydın Büyükşehir Belediyespor (Turkey)	3–0	(Norway) BK Tromsø	25–13	25–15	25–15			75–43	Report
26 Ott	20:30	Kairos Ponta Delgada (Portugal)	3–0	(Denmark) Holte IF	25–15	25–22	25–15			75–52	Report
27 Ott	19:00	Niederösterreich Sokol/Post (Austria)	3–0	(Luxembourg) RSR Walferdange	25–22	25–20	25–15			75–57	Report
27 Ott	18:00	Hapoel Kfar Saba (Israel)	3–0	(Latvia) Rigas Volejbola Skola	25–18	25–21	27–25			77–64	Report
3 Nov	20:00	OK Kaštela (Croatia)	3–1	(Cyprus) AEL Limassol	25–21	25–16	19–25	25–21		94–83	Report
26 Ott	18:00	SOK Mostar (Bosnia and Herzegovina)	0–3	(Lithuania) TK Kaunas VDU	20–25	23–25	21–25			64–75	Report
28 Ott	20:00	VC Kanti Schaffhausen (Switzerland)	3–2	(Czech Republic) TJ Ostrava	26–24	24–26	27–25	23–25	17–15	117–115	Report
28 Ott	18:30	Steelvolleys Linz-Steg (Austria)	3–2	(Switzerland) VBC Cheseaux	22–25	25–22	26–24	20–25	15–12	108–108	Report
27 Ott	18:00	VK Pirane Brusno (Slovakia)	0–3	(Romania) CSM Lugoj	6–25	16–25	9–25			31–75	Report
27 Ott	19:30	Sliedrecht Sport (Netherlands)	1–3	(Belgium) Hermes Rekkenshop Oostende	22–25	23–25	26–24	24–26		95–100	Report
27 Ott	17:00	VKP Bratislava (Slovakia)	0–3	(Greece) Athens ASP Thetis Voula	22–25	17–25	10–25			49–75	Report

==== Second leg ====
Date	Time		Score		Set 1	Set 2	Set 3	Set 4	Set 5	Total	Report
3 Nov	19:00	BK Tromsø (Norway)	0–3	(Turkey) Aydın Büyükşehir Belediyespor	18–25	15–25	11–25			44–75	Report
2 Nov	19:00	Holte IF (Denmark)	0–3	(Portugal) Kairos Ponta Delgada	19–25	14–25	16–25			49–75	Report
3 Nov	19:30	RSR Walferdange (Luxembourg)	0–3	(Austria) Niederösterreich Sokol/Post	22–25	23–25	18–25			63–75	Report
28 Ott	17:00	Rigas Volejbola Skola (Latvia)	1–3	(Israel) Hapoel Kfar Saba	23–25	25–18	12–25	21–25		81–93	Report
4 Nov	20:00	AEL Limassol (Cyprus)	2–3	(Croatia) OK Kaštela	25–19	25–20	15–25	13–25	10–15	88–104	Report
27 Ott	18:00	TK Kaunas VDU (Lithuania)	3–0	(Bosnia and Herzegovina) SOK Mostar	27–25	25–14	27–25			79–64	Report
3 Nov	18:00	TJ Ostrava (Czech Republic)	3–0	(Switzerland) VC Kanti Schaffhausen	25–15	25–22	25–23			75–60	Report
3 Nov	20:00	VBC Cheseaux (Switzerland)	3–0	(Austria) Steelvolleys Linz-Steg	25–16	25–23	25–22			75–61	Report
3 Nov	18:30	CSM Lugoj (Romania)	3–0	(Slovakia) VK Pirane Brusno	25–19	25–11	25–15			75–45	Report
3 Nov	20:30	Hermes Rekkenshop Oostende (Belgium)	3–2	(Netherlands) Sliedrecht Sport	25–21	25–21	22–25	20–25	15–13	107–105	Report
2 Nov	20:00	Athens ASP Thetis Voula (Greece)	3–0	(Slovakia) VKP Bratislava	25–16	25–19	25–22			75–57	Report

== Main phase ==
=== 16th finals ===
Team 1	Agg.	Team 2	1st leg	2nd leg	Golden Set
Hapoel Kfar Saba (Israel)	6–0	(Slovenia) OD Krim Ljubljana	3–0	3–0	
OK Kaštela (Croatia)	0–6	(Romania) CS Medgidia	1–3	1–3	
TENT Obrenovac (Serbia)	6–0	(Croatia) OK Marina Kaštela	3–1	3–0	
VBC Cheseaux (Switzerland)	1–5	(Czech Republic) VK Šelmy Brno	2–3	0–3	
TJ Ostrava (Czech Republic)	2–4	(Greece) Panathinaikos AC Athens	3–2	0–3	
Hermes Rekkenshop Oostende (Belgium)	0–6	(Belgium) Jaraco LVL Genk	0–3	3–0	
Apollo 8 Borne (Netherlands)	1–5	(Spain) Sanaya Libby’s La Laguna	2–3	1–3	
TK Kaunas VDU (Lithuania)	0–6	(Turkey) Nilüfer Belediyespor	1–3	0–3	
Aydın Büyükşehir Belediyespor (Turkey)	6–0	(Bosnia and Herzegovina) ŽOK Gacko	3–0	3–0	
Maccabi Hadera (Israel)	0–6	(Hungary) 1. MCM-Diamant Kaposvar	0–3	1–3	
Niederösterreich Sokol/Post (Austria)	6–0	(Austria) UVC Holding Graz	3–0	3–0	
CSM Lugoj (Romania)	5–1	(Switzerland) Sm’Aesch Pfeffingen	3–2	3–1	
Athens ASP Thetis Voula (Greece)	0–6	(Italy) Savino Del Bene Scandicci	0–3	0–3	
Kairos Ponta Delgada (Portugal)	0–6	(Germany) SC Potsdam	0–3	0–3	
Kazanlak Volley (Bulgaria)	3–3	(Slovakia) VP UFK Nitra	3–0	1–3	9–15
CD das Aves Termolan (Portugal)	0–6	(France) RC Cannes	0–3	0–3	

==== First leg ====
Date	Time		Score		Set 1	Set 2	Set 3	Set 4	Set 5	Total	Report
18 Nov	18:30	Hapoel Kfar Saba (Israel)	3–0	(Slovenia) OD Krim Ljubljana	25–18	25–20	25–17			75–55	Report
17 Nov	17:30	OK Kaštela (Croatia)	1–3	(Romania) CS Medgidia	25–23	12–25	20–25	14–25		71–98	Report
16 Nov	19:00	TENT Obrenovac (Serbia)	3–1	(Croatia) OK Marina Kaštela	16–25	25–19	25–19	25–14		91–77	Report
17 Nov	20:00	VBC Cheseaux (Switzerland)	2–3	(Czech Republic) VK Šelmy Brno	17–25	22–25	25–20	25–19	8–15	97–104	Report
17 Nov	18:00	TJ Ostrava (Czech Republic)	3–2	(Greece) Panathinaikos AC Athens	28–26	25–23	18–25	18–25	15–11	104–110	Report
17 Nov	20:00	Hermes Rekkenshop Oostende (Belgium)	0–3	(Belgium) Jaraco LVL Genk	24–26	19–25	18–25			61–76	Report
18 Nov	20:00	Apollo 8 Borne (Netherlands)	2–3	(Spain) Sanaya Libby’s La Laguna	26–24	22–25	25–20	18–25	12–15	103–109	Report
23 Nov	18:00	TK Kaunas VDU (Lithuania)	1–3	(Turkey) Nilüfer Belediyespor	12–25	19–25	25–22	18–25		74–97	Report
17 Nov	19:00	Aydın Büyükşehir Belediyespor (Turkey)	3–0	(Bosnia and Herzegovina) ŽOK Gacko	25–14	25–18	25–17			75–49	Report
17 Nov	17:15	Maccabi Hadera (Israel)	0–3	(Hungary) 1. MCM-Diamant Kaposvar	20–25	14–25	15–25			49–75	Report
17 Nov	19:00	Niederösterreich Sokol/Post (Austria)	3–0	(Austria) UVC Holding Graz	28–26	25–18	25–20			78–64	Report
17 Nov	18:30	CSM Lugoj (Romania)	3–2	(Switzerland) Sm’Aesch Pfeffingen	23–25	21–25	25–23	25–19	15–8	109–100	Report
17 Nov	19:00	Athens ASP Thetis Voula (Greece)	0–3	(Italy) Savino Del Bene Scandicci	11–25	15–25	21–25			47–75	Report
24 Nov	19:00	Kairos Ponta Delgada (Portugal)	0–3	(Germany) SC Potsdam	12–25	12–25	14–25			38–75	Report
17 Nov	18:00	Kazanlak Volley (Bulgaria)	3–0	(Slovakia) VP UFK Nitra	25–21	25–21	25–22			75–64	Report
17 Nov	20:00	CD das Aves Termolan (Portugal)	0–3	(France) RC Cannes	16–25	21–25	16–25			53–75	Report

==== Second leg ====
Date	Time		Score		Set 1	Set 2	Set 3	Set 4	Set 5	Total	Report
24 Nov	19:00	OD Krim Ljubljana (Slovenia)	0–3	(Israel) Hapoel Kfar Saba	15–25	20–25	13–25			48–75	Report
18 Nov	17:30	CS Medgidia (Romania)	3–1	(Croatia) OK Kaštela	25–19	25–14	22–25	25–17		97–75	Report
17 Nov	19:00	OK Marina Kaštela (Croatia)	0–3	(Serbia) TENT Obrenovac	18–25	15–25	14–25			47–75	Report
25 Nov	18:00	VK Šelmy Brno (Czech Republic)	3–0	(Switzerland) VBC Cheseaux	25–17	25–20	25–11			75–48	Report
24 Nov	20:00	Panathinaikos AC Athens (Greece)	3–0	(Czech Republic) TJ Ostrava	25–18	25–21	25–17			75–56	Report
24 Nov	20:00	Jaraco LVL Genk (Belgium)	0–3	(Belgium) Hermes Rekkenshop Oostende	0–25	0–25	0–25			0–75	Report
24 Nov	20:00	Sanaya Libby’s La Laguna (Spain)	3–1	(Netherlands) Apollo 8 Borne	25–19	15–25	25–19	25–17		90–80	Report
24 Nov	18:00	Nilüfer Belediyespor (Turkey)	3–0	(Lithuania) TK Kaunas VDU	25–19	25–22	25–7			75–48	Report
24 Nov	19:00	ŽOK Gacko (Bosnia and Herzegovina)	0–3	(Turkey) Aydın Büyükşehir Belediyespor	19–25	22–25	22–25			63–75	Report
23 Nov	18:00	1. MCM-Diamant Kaposvar (Hungary)	3–1	(Israel) Maccabi Hadera	25–19	20–25	25–15	25–11		95–70	Report
24 Nov	19:00	UVC Holding Graz (Austria)	0–3	(Austria) Niederösterreich Sokol/Post	0–25	0–25	0–25			0–75	Report
25 Nov	20:00	Sm’Aesch Pfeffingen (Switzerland)	1–3	(Romania) CSM Lugoj	21–25	25–22	23–25	26–28		95–100	Report
18 Nov	19:00	Savino Del Bene Scandicci (Italy)	3–0	(Greece) Athens ASP Thetis Voula	25–20	25–20	25–15			75–55	Report
23 Nov	19:00	SC Potsdam (Germany)	3–0	(Portugal) Kairos Ponta Delgada	25–15	25–14	25–18			75–47	Report
24 Nov	18:00	VP UFK Nitra (Slovakia)	3–1	(Bulgaria) Kazanlak Volley	25–22	21–25	25–21	25–16		96–84	Report
Golden set		VP UFK Nitra (Slovakia)	15–9	(Bulgaria) Kazanlak Volley							
24 Nov	20:00	RC Cannes (France)	3–0	(Portugal) CD das Aves Termolan	25–15	25–18	25–21			75–54	Report

=== 8th finals ===
Team 1	Agg.	Team 2	1st leg	2nd leg
Hapoel Kfar Saba (Israel)	0–6	(Romania) CS Medgidia	0–3	0–3
TENT Obrenovac (Serbia)	5–1	(Czech Republic) VK Šelmy Brno	3–2	3–0
Panathinaikos AC Athens (Greece)	4–2	(Belgium) Hermes Rekkenshop Oostende	3–0	2–3
Sanaya Libby’s La Laguna (Spain)	5–1	(Turkey) Nilüfer Belediyespor	3–2	3–1
Aydın Büyükşehir Belediyespor (Turkey)	6–0	(Hungary) 1. MCM-Diamant Kaposvar	3–0	3–0
Niederösterreich Sokol/Post (Austria)	0–6	(Romania) CSM Lugoj	0–3	0–3
Savino Del Bene Scandicci (Italy)	6–0	(Germany) SC Potsdam	3–1	3–0
VP UFK Nitra (Slovakia)	0–6	(France) RC Cannes	0–3	1–3

==== First leg ====
Date	Time		Score		Set 1	Set 2	Set 3	Set 4	Set 5	Total	Report
8 Dec	17:30	Hapoel Kfar Saba (Israel)	0–3	(Romania) CS Medgidia	17–25	22–25	19–25			58–75	Report
7 Dec	19:00	TENT Obrenovac (Serbia)	3–2	(Czech Republic) VK Šelmy Brno	25–12	29–27	24–26	21–25	15–2	114–92	Report
14 Dec	15:30	Panathinaikos AC Athens (Greece)	3–0	(Belgium) Hermes Rekkenshop Oostende	25–17	25–10	25–12			75–39	Report
8 Dec	18:00	Sanaya Libby’s La Laguna (Spain)	3–2	(Turkey) Nilüfer Belediyespor	22–25	17–25	25–21	25–19	15–10	104–100	Report
7 Dec	19:00	Aydın Büyükşehir Belediyespor (Turkey)	3–0	(Hungary) 1. MCM-Diamant Kaposvar	25–19	25–14	25–23			75–56	Report
8 Dec	19:00	Niederösterreich Sokol/Post (Austria)	0–3	(Romania) CSM Lugoj	22–25	23–25	20–25			65–75	Report
8 Dec	17:30	Savino Del Bene Scandicci (Italy)	3–1	(Germany) SC Potsdam	20–25	25–15	25–18	25–16		95–74	Report
8 Dec	18:00	VP UFK Nitra (Slovakia)	0–3	(France) RC Cannes	19–25	16–25	28–30			63–80	Report

==== Second leg ====
Date	Time		Score		Set 1	Set 2	Set 3	Set 4	Set 5	Total	Report
15 Dec	18:30	CS Medgidia (Romania)	3–0	(Israel) Hapoel Kfar Saba	29–27	25–17	25–22			79–66	Report
14 Dec	18:00	VK Šelmy Brno (Czech Republic)	0–3	(Serbia) TENT Obrenovac	21–25	19–25	12–25			52–75	Report
15 Dec	15:30	Hermes Rekkenshop Oostende (Belgium)	3–2	(Greece) Panathinaikos AC Athens	25–22	18–25	25–21	22–25	15–10	105–103	Report
15 Dec	18:00	Nilüfer Belediyespor (Turkey)	1–3	(Spain) Sanaya Libby’s La Laguna	15–25	25–12	23–25	16–25		79–87	Report
14 Dec	18:00	1. MCM-Diamant Kaposvar (Hungary)	0–3	(Turkey) Aydın Büyükşehir Belediyespor	17–25	26–28	20–25			63–78	Report
15 Dec	18:30	CSM Lugoj (Romania)	3–0	(Austria) Niederösterreich Sokol/Post	25–19	25–13	25–19			75–51	Report
14 Dec	19:00	SC Potsdam (Germany)	0–3	(Italy) Savino Del Bene Scandicci	17–25	16–25	17–25			50–75	Report
14 Dec	20:30	RC Cannes (France)	3–1	(Slovakia) VP UFK Nitra	25–14	25–19	23–25	25–22		98–80	Report

=== 4th finals ===
Team 1	Agg.	Team 2	1st leg	2nd leg
CS Medgidia (Romania)	0–6	(Serbia) TENT Obrenovac	1–3	0–3
Panathinaikos AC Athens (Greece)	1–5	(Spain) Sanaya Libby’s La Laguna	2–3	0–3
Aydın Büyükşehir Belediyespor (Turkey)	4–2	(Romania) CSM Lugoj	3–2	3–2
Savino Del Bene Scandicci (Italy)	6–0	(France) RC Cannes	3–1	3–0

==== First leg ====
Date	Time		Score		Set 1	Set 2	Set 3	Set 4	Set 5	Total	Report
26 Jan	18:30	CS Medgidia (Romania)	1–3	(Serbia) TENT Obrenovac	21–25	22–25	25–23	18–25		86–98	Report
27 Jan	20:00	Panathinaikos AC Athens (Greece)	2–3	(Spain) Sanaya Libby’s La Laguna	16–25	25–12	29–27	21–25	12–15	103–104	Report
25 Jan	19:00	Aydın Büyükşehir Belediyespor (Turkey)	3–2	(Romania) CSM Lugoj	26–28	25–16	25–16	22–25	15–10	113–95	Report
26 Jan	18:00	Savino Del Bene Scandicci (Italy)	3–1	(France) RC Cannes	25–14	24–26	25–22	25–19		99–81	Report

==== Second leg ====
Date	Time		Score		Set 1	Set 2	Set 3	Set 4	Set 5	Total	Report
3 Feb	19:00	TENT Obrenovac (Serbia)	3–0	(Romania) CS Medgidia	25–16	25–23	25–21			75–60	Report
2 Feb	18:00	Sanaya Libby’s La Laguna (Spain)	3–0	(Greece) Panathinaikos AC Athens	25–21	25–23	25–19			75–63	Report
1 Feb	18:30	CSM Lugoj (Romania)	2–3	(Turkey) Aydın Büyükşehir Belediyespor	25–23	24–26	25–22	20–25	9–15	103–111	Report
2 Feb	20:00	RC Cannes (France)	0–3	(Italy) Savino Del Bene Scandicci	26–28	18–25	25–27			69–80	Report

== Final phase ==
=== Semifinals ===
Team 1	Agg.	Team 2	1st leg	2nd leg
TENT Obrenovac (Serbia)	0–6	(Spain) Sanaya Libby’s La Laguna	1–3	0–3
Aydın Büyükşehir Belediyespor (Turkey)	1–5	(Italy) Savino Del Bene Scandicci	2–3	0–3

==== First leg ====
Date	Time		Score		Set 1	Set 2	Set 3	Set 4	Set 5	Total	Report
24 Feb	19:00	TENT Obrenovac (Serbia)	1–3	(Spain) Sanaya Libby’s La Laguna	16–25	22–25	25–19	20–25		83–94	Report
24 Feb	19:00	Aydın Büyükşehir Belediyespor (Turkey)	2–3	(Italy) Savino Del Bene Scandicci	21–25	25–23	25–22	18–25	10–15	99–110	Report

==== Second leg ====
Date	Time		Score		Set 1	Set 2	Set 3	Set 4	Set 5	Total	Report
2 Mar	20:00	Sanaya Libby’s La Laguna (Spain)	3–0	(Serbia) TENT Obrenovac	25–22	25–16	25–16			75–54	Report
2 Mar	19:00	Savino Del Bene Scandicci (Italy)	3–0	(Turkey) Aydın Büyükşehir Belediyespor	25–14	25–15	25–22			75–51	Report

=== Finals ===
Team 1	Agg.	Team 2	1st leg	2nd leg
Sanaya Libby’s La Laguna (Spain)	0–6	(Italy) Savino Del Bene Scandicci	0–3	0–3

==== First leg ====
Date	Time		Score		Set 1	Set 2	Set 3	Set 4	Set 5	Total	Report
16 Mar	20:00	Sanaya Libby’s La Laguna (Spain)	0–3	(Italy) Savino Del Bene Scandicci	20–25	22–25	15–25			57–75	Report

==== Second leg ====
Date	Time		Score		Set 1	Set 2	Set 3	Set 4	Set 5	Total	Report
23 Mar	20:30	Savino Del Bene Scandicci (Italy)	3–0	(Spain) Sanaya Libby’s La Laguna	25–12	25–12	25–10			75–34	Report
