= 2017–18 Divizia A1 (women's volleyball) =

Divizia A1
- Teams: 10

Regular season
- Relegated: none

Finals
- Champions: CSM București (1st title)
- Runners-up: Alba Blaj
- Third place: Știința Bacău
- Fourth place: Târgoviște

The 2017–18 Divizia A1 season was the 68th season of the Divizia A1, the highest professional volleyball league in Romania. CSM Volei Alba Blaj was the defending champion. At the end of the season, CSM București won their first title.

== Competition format ==
The competition format will be the same as in the previous season.

- 12 teams played the regular season, consisting in a double-legged round robin format.
- At the end of the regular season, teams are split into two groups, one of them composed by the first six teams and the other one by the rest. In this second stage all points of the regular season are counted and the teams will face each other from its group twice.

== Teams ==
SCM U Craiova and CSU Galați were relegated to Divizia A2. Unic Piatra Neamț and SCM Ptești withdrew from Divizia A1.

Agroland Timișoara and Universitatea Cluj promoted from Divizia A2.

Location of teams in 2017–18 Divizia A1

| Team | City | Arena | Capacity |
|---|---|---|---|
| Agroland | Timișoara | Constantin Jude | 2,200 |
| Alba | Blaj | Timotei Cipariu | 400 |
| CSM | Bucharest | Sala Elite | 500 |
| CSM | Lugoj | I.K. Ghermănescu | 400 |
| CSM | Târgoviște | Polyvalent Hall | 2,000 |
| CSU Medicina | Târgu Mureș | Sala Sporturilor | 2,000 |
| Dinamo | București | Dinamo | 2,538 |
| Penicilina | Iași | Polyvalent Hall | 1,500 |
| Știința | Bacău | Sala Sporturilor | 2,000 |
| Universitatea | Cluj-Napoca | Horia Demian | 2,525 |

== Regular season table ==
| Pos | Team | Pld | W | L | Pts | SW | SL | SR | SPW | SPL | SPR | Qualification |
|---|---|---|---|---|---|---|---|---|---|---|---|---|
| 1 | CSM București (Q) | 18 | 17 | 1 | 51 | 53 | 8 | 6.625 | 1482 | 1077 | 1.376 | Qualification to Play-off |
| 2 | Alba Blaj (Q) | 18 | 15 | 3 | 45 | 47 | 11 | 4.273 | 1409 | 1068 | 1.319 | Qualification to Play-off |
| 3 | Știința Bacău (Q) | 18 | 13 | 5 | 41 | 43 | 13 | 3.308 | 1407 | 1161 | 1.212 | Qualification to Play-off |
| 4 | Târgoviște (Q) | 18 | 13 | 5 | 36 | 43 | 25 | 1.720 | 1550 | 1387 | 1.118 | Qualification to Play-off |
| 5 | Agroland Timișoara (Q) | 18 | 12 | 6 | 35 | 38 | 25 | 1.520 | 1419 | 1340 | 1.059 | Qualification to Play-off |
| 6 | Lugoj (Q) | 18 | 6 | 12 | 19 | 25 | 39 | 0.641 | 1314 | 1441 | 0.912 | Qualification to Play-off |
| 7 | Dinamo București (Q) | 18 | 4 | 14 | 14 | 20 | 45 | 0.444 | 1289 | 1452 | 0.888 | Qualification to Play-out |
| 8 | Universitatea Cluj (Q) | 18 | 4 | 14 | 11 | 16 | 45 | 0.356 | 1181 | 1428 | 0.827 | Qualification to Play-out |
| 9 | Penicilina Iași (Q) | 18 | 4 | 14 | 11 | 17 | 48 | 0.354 | 1191 | 1510 | 0.789 | Qualification to Play-out |
| 10 | Târgu Mureș (Q) | 18 | 2 | 16 | 7 | 12 | 50 | 0.240 | 1101 | 1479 | 0.744 | Qualification to Play-out |

Source: Romanian Volleyball Federation
(Q) Qualified for the phase indicated

== Play-off ==
| Pos | Team | Pld | W | L | Pts | SW | SL | SR | SPW | SPL | SPR | Qualification |
|---|---|---|---|---|---|---|---|---|---|---|---|---|
| 1 | CSM București (C, Q) | 28 | 25 | 3 | 76 | 81 | 37 | 2.189 | 2422 | 1849 | 1.310 | Qualification to CEV Women's Champions League |
| 2 | Alba Blaj (Q) | 28 | 24 | 4 | 70 | 74 | 22 | 3.364 | 2293 | 1840 | 1.246 | Qualification to Women's CEV Cup |
| 3 | Știința Bacău (Q) | 28 | 17 | 11 | 54 | 62 | 39 | 1.590 | 2282 | 2085 | 1.094 | Qualification to CEV Women's Challenge Cup |
| 4 | Târgoviște (Q) | 28 | 19 | 9 | 52 | 64 | 27 | 2.370 | 2439 | 2272 | 1.074 | Qualification to CEV Women's Challenge Cup |
| 5 | Agroland Timișoara | 28 | 15 | 13 | 45 | 53 | 47 | 1.128 | 2183 | 2180 | 1.001 | |
| 6 | Lugoj | 28 | 6 | 22 | 20 | 30 | 69 | 0.435 | 1970 | 2293 | 0.859 | |

Source: Romanian Volleyball Federation
(C) Champion; (Q) Qualified for the phase indicated

== Play-out ==
In the meeting of the Board of Directors of the Romanian Volleyball Federation from 26 February 2018 it was decided to cancel the play-out round, places 7–10. The final ranking for these places remains the same as that at the end of the regular season.
