= Romanian Women's Volleyball Cup =

Annual volleyball competition in Romania

- Sport: Volleyball
- Founded: 2007
- Administrator: FRV
- Country: Romania
- Continent: Europe
- Most recent champion: CSM Volei Alba Blaj (4th title)
- Most titles: CSM Volei Alba Blaj (4 titles)
- Website: https://www.frvolei.ro/

The Romanian Women's Volleyball Cup is an annual women's volleyball cup competition held in Romania every year under the control of the Romanian Volleyball Federation (FRV) since the year 2007, CSM Volei Alba Blaj is the current Title holder as well as the alltime record holder with 4 titles

== Winners list ==
Years	Winners	Score	Runners-up
2007	CSU Galați	3 - 0 (27–25, 25–8, 25–19)	CS Știința Bacău
2008	CSU Galați	3 - 0 (25–16, 25–17, 25–20)	CS Știința Bacău
2009	CSU Galați	3 - 0 (25–22, 25–18, 25–19)	CS Dinamo București
2010	CS Dinamo București	3 - 0 (25–19, 25–22, 25–23)	C.S. 2004 Tomis Constanța
2011	C.S. 2004 Tomis Constanța	3 - 0 (25–18, 25–23, 25–22)	CS Știința Bacău
2012	CS Dinamo București	3 - 0 (25–18, 25–20, 25–18)	C.S. 2004 Tomis Constanța
2013	CS Știința Bacău	3 - 2 (18–25, 25–23, 27–25, 24–26, 15–8)	CS Dinamo București
2014	CS Știința Bacău	3 - 2 (14–25, 25–21, 17–25, 25–20, 15–10)	CS Dinamo București
2015	CS Știința Bacău	3 - 0 (25–0, 25–0, 25–0)	CS Dinamo București
2016	CSM Târgoviște	3 - 0 (25–20, 26–24, 25–23)	CSM București
2017	CSM Volei Alba Blaj	3 - 0 (25–14, 25–17, 25–19)	CS Știința Bacău
2018	CSM București	3 - 1 (21–25, 25–19, 25–16, 25–23)	CSM Volei Alba Blaj
2019	CSM Volei Alba Blaj	3 - 1 (25–19, 20–25, 25–18, 25–22)	CSM Târgoviște
2020	Not Finished		
2021	CSM Volei Alba Blaj	3 - 0 (25–13, 25–22, 25–19)	CS Dinamo București
2022	CSM Volei Alba Blaj	3 - 1 (28–30, 26–24, 25–12, 25-22 )	CSM Târgoviște
