= Tsvetelina Zarkova =

Bulgarian volleyball player

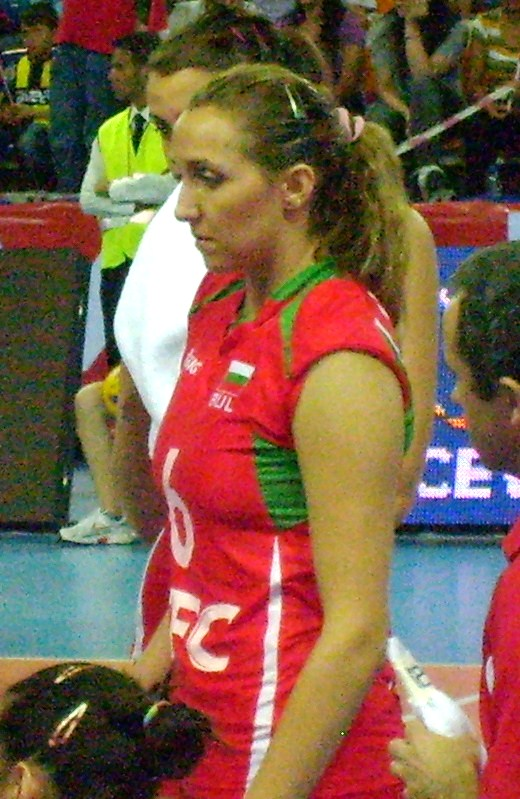

Personal information
- Full name: Tsvetelina Valerieva Zarkova
- Nationality: Bulgaria
- Born: 18 December 1986 (age 39) Pernik, Bulgaria
- Height: 1.87 m (6 ft 2 in)
- Weight: 69 kg (152 lb)
- Spike: 298 cm (117 in)
- Block: 289 cm (114 in)

Volleyball information
- Position: Middle blocker
- Current club: CS Știința Bacău
- Number: 9 (club); 6 (national team)

National team
- Years: Team
- 2004–: Bulgaria
- Updated on 7 January 2017

Tsvetelina Zarkova (Bulgarian: Цветелина Заркова; born 18 December 1986 in Pernik) is a Bulgarian female volleyball player. She is a member of the Bulgaria women's national volleyball team and plays for CS Știința Bacău. She was part of the Bulgarian national team at the 2014 FIVB Volleyball Women's World Championship in Italy.

== Clubs ==
- (Bulgaria) VC Akademik Sofia
- (Bulgaria) Levski Sofia (2002–2004)
- (Germany) Rote Raben Vilsbiburg (2005–2009)
- (Azerbaijan) Lokomotiv Baku (2009–2010)
- (Russia) VC Samorodok Khabarovsk (2010–2011)
- (Romania) 2004 Tomis Constanța (2011–2012)
- (Czech Republic) VK Prostějov (2012–2013)
- (Romania) CS Dinamo București (2013–2014)
- (Romania) CS Volei Alba-Blaj (2014–2015)
- (Romania) CS Știința Bacău (2015–present)

== Honours and awards ==
=== Titles ===
- German Championship - 2008
- German Cup - 2009
- Czech Championship - 2013
- Czech Cup - 2013
- Romanian Championship - 2012, 2015
