= Sara Klisura =

Serbian volleyball player

Personal information
- Nationality: Serbian
- Born: July 15, 1992 (age 34) Subotica, FR Yugoslavia
- Home town: Novi Sad, Serbia
- Height: 1.88 m (6 ft 2 in)
- Weight: 68 kg (150 lb)
- Spike: 310 cm (122 in)
- Block: 300 cm (118 in)

Volleyball information
- Position: Outside hitter
- Current club: 1. MCM-Diamant KE
- Number: 1

Career
- Years: Team
- 2006–2010 2010–2012 2012–2014 2014–2015 2015–2016 2017 2017 2018 2018–2019 2019–2020: Spartak Subotica; Vizura Beograd; Foppapedretti Bergamo; CSM Târgoviște; Yenisey Krasnoyarsk; CSM Târgoviște; Foton Tornadoes; Cocolife Asset Managers; CSM Târgoviște; 1. MCM-Diamant KE

National team
- Years: Team
- 2008–2009 2009–2011 2011–2013: Serbia U-18; Serbia U-20; Serbia
Honours
Women's volleyball
Representing Serbia
World Championship
Silver medal – second place	2009 Thailand	Team
European Championship
Silver medal – second place	2009 Netherlands	Team
Silver medal – second place	2010 Serbia	Team

Sara Klisura (Serbian Cyrillic: Сара Клисура; born 15 July 1992) is a Serbian professional volleyball player. She was a member of the women's national volleyball team of Serbia from 2008 to 2013. She was part of the national squad that won the silver medals at the 2009 World Championship and 2009 & 2010 European Championships. Her current club is 1. MCM-Diamant KE.

== Career ==
=== Pre-2010: Junior years ===
Klisura's volleyball career debuted in 2006 with Spartak Subotica, a club that plays in the Volleyball League of Serbia. She played with Spartak for four seasons. In 2009, she joined the Serbia women's national under-18 volleyball team where she played as a wing-spiker. The national team won the silver medal for both the European and the World Championships. Her main accomplishments as a junior player also came in that year where she won the Best server award for both championships.

She was one of the awardees of the Volleyball Federation of Serbia in 2010, where she was awarded as the Best receiver. She also received the IOC trophy on behalf of her team when the Olympic Committee of Serbia chose the men's and women's volleyball teams as the Best Serbian National Teams of 2010.

She was part of 39 national selections in total.

=== 2010–2011: Vizura Beograd ===
Klisura started to play in the professional ranks when she was 18 years old. She transferred to Vizura Beograd in 2010 and played with the club for two seasons. During her years with Vizura, the club won the silver medal for both the Super League and the Serbian Cup.

=== 2012–Early 2017: Playing in Europe ===
Klisura began to play abroad in 2012. She joined the Italian volleyball club Foppapedretti Bergamo that plays in the Serie A, the highest professional women's volleyball league in Italy. She remained as a member for two years. In the 2012-2013 season, the club finished at third place in the Italian league.

In 2014, she joined the Romanian volleyball club CSM Târgoviște that plays in the country's top professional volleyball league, Divizia A1. The club finished at 4th place in the 2014-2015 season.

In 2015, she joined the Russian volleyball club Yenisey Krasnoyarsk that plays in the Super League, the highest professional women's volleyball league in Russia. The club finished at 7th place in the 2015-2016 season. She left the club after a year and went back to Romania.

In 2017, she joined the CSM Târgoviște for the 2nd part of the Divizia A1's 2016-2017 season. The club finished at 3rd place in the championship.

=== Late 2017–Early 2018: Playing in Asia ===
In August 2017, Klisura was scouted by her former coach, Moro Branislav, to play in the 2017 PSL Grand Prix Conference in the Philippines. She joined the Foton Tornadoes volleyball club that plays in the Philippine Super Liga, a semi-professional corporate club volleyball league that is recognized by the FIVB and the AVC. The club finished at 3rd place after the championship. Klisura won the Best scorer in a Match award for dropping 41 points in one of the games. This score is her personal record for points. This also paved way to the creation of her moniker, "Kill-sura".

In the 2018 season of the PSL Grand Prix, she transferred to Cocolife Asset Managers where she played as the team captain. The club finished at 4th place after the championship and she won the 1st Best Outside Spiker award .

=== Late 2018–2019: Back in Europe ===
Klisura joined CSM Târgoviște for the third time and played at the 2018–19 season of Divizia A1 in Romania and won the bronze medal. The club also participated at the 2019 CEV Cup.

In late 2019, she joined 1. MCM-Diamant KE, a Hungarian volleyball club that plays in the Hungarian Cup and Extraliga.

== Clubs ==
- (Serbia) Spartak Subotica (2006–2010)
- (Serbia) Vizura Beograd (2010–2012)
- (Italy) Foppapedretti Bergamo (2012–2014)
- (Romania) CSM Târgoviște (2014–2015)
- (Russia) Yenisey Krasnoyarsk (2015–2016)
- (Romania) CSM Târgoviște (2017)
- (Philippines) Foton Tornadoes (2017)
- (Philippines) Cocolife Asset Managers (2018)
- (Romania) CSM Târgoviște (2018–2019)
- (Hungary) 1. MCM-Diamant KE (2019–2020)

== Awards ==
=== Individuals ===
==== Junior ====
- 2009 Girls' Youth European Volleyball Championship "Best server"
- 2009 FIVB Volleyball Girls' U18 World Championship "Best server"
- 2010 Volleyball Federation of Serbia "Best receiver"

==== Senior ====
- 2017 Philippine Super Liga Grand Prix "Best scorer in a Match"
- 2018 Philippine Super Liga Grand Prix "1st Best Outside Spiker"

=== National team ===
- 2009 European Championship – Runner-up, with Serbia U-18
- 2009 World Championship - Runner-up, with Serbia U-18
- 2010 European Championship – Runner-up, with Serbia U-18
- 2010 Olympic Committee of Serbia Awards – Best Serbian National Team, with Serbia Women's National Volleyball Team

=== Clubs ===
- 2010 Serbian Super League – Runner-up, with OK Vizura
- 2011 Serbian Cup – Runner-up, with OK Vizura
- 2012–2013 Serie A1 – Third, with Foppapedretti Bergamo
- 2016–2017 Divizia A1 – Third, with CSM Târgoviște
- 2017 Philippine SuperLiga Grand Prix – Third, with Foton Tornadoes
- 2018–2019 Divizia A1 – Third, with CSM Târgoviște
