= 2018–19 Divizia A1 (women's volleyball) =

Divizia A1
- Teams: 10

Regular season
- Relegated: Agroland Timișoara; Penicilina Iași

Finals
- Champions: Alba Blaj (4th title)
- Runners-up: CSM București
- Third place: Târgoviște
- Fourth place: Știința Bacău

The 2018–19 Divizia A1 season was the 69th season of the Divizia A1, the highest professional volleyball league in Romania. CSM București was the defending champion. At the end of the season, Alba Blaj won their fourth title. Agroland Timișoara and Penicilina Iași were relegated.

== Competition format ==
The competition format will be the same as in the previous season.

- 12 teams played the regular season, consisting in a double-legged round robin format.
- At the end of the regular season, teams are split into two groups, one of them composed by the first six teams and the other one by the rest. In this second stage all points of the regular season are counted and the teams will face each other from its group twice.

== Team changes ==
Promoted from Divizia A2

- CSU Galați

CSU Oradea

Relegated to Divizia A2

- —

=== Excluded teams ===
CSU Oradea promoted to Divizia A1, but due to the lack of funds chose not to join the championship and enrolled again in the Divizia A2.

Medicina Târgu Mureș encountered financial problems and entered in a partnership with the newly founded CSM Târgu Mureș, becoming the women's volleyball section of the sports club. The team was enrolled in the Divizia A2.

== Teams ==
Location of teams in 2018–19 Divizia A1

| Team | City | Arena | Capacity |
|---|---|---|---|
| Agroland | Timișoara | Constantin Jude | 2,200 |
| Alba | Blaj | Timotei Cipariu | 400 |
| CSM | Bucharest | Sala Elite | 500 |
| CSM | Lugoj | I.K. Ghermănescu | 400 |
| CSM | Târgoviște | Polyvalent Hall | 2,000 |
| CSU | Galați | Dunărea | 1,500 |
| Dinamo | București | Dinamo | 2,538 |
| Penicilina | Iași | Polyvalent Hall | 1,500 |
| Știința | Bacău | Sala Sporturilor | 2,000 |
| Universitatea | Cluj-Napoca | Horia Demian | 2,525 |

== Regular season table ==
| Pos | Team | Pld | W | L | Pts | SW | SL | SR | SPW | SPL | SPR | Qualification |
|---|---|---|---|---|---|---|---|---|---|---|---|---|
| 1 | Alba Blaj | 15 | 14 | 1 | 43 | 44 | 5 | 8.800 | 1199 | 853 | 1.406 | Qualification to Play-off |
| 2 | CSM București | 15 | 13 | 2 | 38 | 39 | 8 | 4.875 | 1115 | 829 | 1.345 | Qualification to Play-off |
| 3 | Târgoviște | 15 | 11 | 4 | 32 | 35 | 18 | 1.944 | 1177 | 1043 | 1.128 | Qualification to Play-off |
| 4 | Știința Bacău | 15 | 9 | 6 | 26 | 30 | 21 | 1.429 | 1155 | 1070 | 1.079 | Qualification to Play-off |
| 5 | Lugoj | 15 | 5 | 10 | 15 | 18 | 33 | 0.545 | 1042 | 1133 | 0.920 | Qualification to Play-off |
| 6 | Dinamo București | 15 | 4 | 11 | 13 | 17 | 35 | 0.486 | 984 | 1211 | 0.813 | Qualification to Play-off |
| 7 | Universitatea Cluj | 15 | 4 | 11 | 11 | 13 | 35 | 0.371 | 924 | 1109 | 0.833 | Qualification to Play-out |
| 8 | Galați | 15 | 1 | 14 | 4 | 6 | 43 | 0.140 | 842 | 1183 | 0.712 | Qualification to Play-out |
| 9 | Agroland Timișoara (E) | 0 | 0 | 0 | 0 (Note: Agroland Timișoara withdrew from the championship in the first part of the season and all their results were canceled.) | 0 | 0 | — | 0 | 0 | — | Withdrew |
| 10 | Penicilina Iași (E) | 0 | 0 | 0 | 0 (Note: Penicilina Iași was excluded from the championship in the first part of the season and all their results were canceled.) | 0 | 0 | — | 0 | 0 | — | Withdrew |

Source: Romanian Volleyball Federation
(E) Eliminated

== Play-off ==
| Pos | Team | Pld | W | L | Pts | SW | SL | SR | SPW | SPL | SPR | Qualification |
|---|---|---|---|---|---|---|---|---|---|---|---|---|
| 1 | Alba Blaj (C, Q) | 25 | 23 | 2 | 69 | 72 | 11 | 6.545 | 2014 | 1502 | 1.341 | Qualification to CEV Women's Champions League |
| 2 | CSM București (Q) | 25 | 21 | 4 | 63 | 66 | 15 | 4.400 | 1914 | 1439 | 1.330 | Qualification to Women's CEV Cup |
| 3 | Târgoviște (Q) | 25 | 16 | 9 | 47 | 53 | 37 | 1.432 | 1966 | 1828 | 1.075 | Qualification to CEV Women's Challenge Cup |
| 4 | Știința Bacău (Q) | 25 | 15 | 10 | 43 | 48 | 37 | 1.297 | 1880 | 1808 | 1.040 | Qualification to CEV Women's Challenge Cup |
| 5 | Lugoj | 25 | 6 | 19 | 18 | 22 | 61 | 0.361 | 1632 | 1909 | 0.855 | |
| 6 | Dinamo București | 25 | 5 | 20 | 17 | 25 | 62 | 0.403 | 1666 | 2053 | 0.811 | |

Source: Romanian Volleyball Federation
(C) Champion; (Q) Qualified for the phase indicated

== Play-out ==
| Pos | Team | Pld | W | L | Pts | SW | SL | SR | SPW | SPL | SPR |
|---|---|---|---|---|---|---|---|---|---|---|---|
| 7 | Universitatea Cluj | 17 | 5 | 12 | 14 | 18 | 40 | 0.450 | 1137 | 1308 | 0.869 |
| 8 | Galați | 17 | 2 | 15 | 7 | 11 | 48 | 0.229 | 1041 | 11396 | 0.091 |

Source: Romanian Volleyball Federation
