= Nicoleta Manu =

Romanian volleyball player

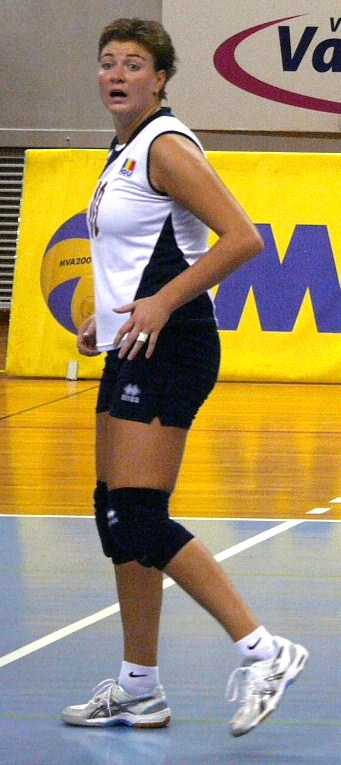

Personal information
- Full name: Nicoleta Manu (Țolișteanu)
- Nickname: Toli
- Nationality: Romania
- Born: 3 December 1980 (age 45); Piatra Neamț, Romania
- Height: 1.72 m (5 ft 8 in)
- Weight: 67 kg (148 lb)

Volleyball information
- Position: Libero
- Current club: CS Știința Bacău
- Number: 3 (club); 10 (national team)

National team
2002–	Romania
- Last updated: 7 January 2017

Nicoleta Manu (née Țolișteanu, born 3 December 1980 in Piatra Neamț) is a retired Romanian female volleyball player, who plays as a libero. She is part of the Romania women's national volleyball team and plays for Divizia A1 (Romanian's top league) side CS Știința Bacău.

== Career ==
Manu has played in many tournaments with Romania women's national volleyball team, including the Women's European Volleyball Championship of 2003, 2005 and 2011, the 2002 FIVB Volleyball Women's World Championship in Germany and the 2015 European Games in Baku.

She was awarded the best receiver at the 2003 Women's European Volleyball Championship. She is nicknamed Țoli (in reference to her maiden name Țolișteanu) by her teammates.

== Clubs ==
- (Romania) CS Știința Bacău (1999–2012)
- (France) Hainaut Volley (2012–2013)
- (Romania) CSM București (2013–2013)
- (Romania) CS Dinamo București (2013–2015)
- (Romania) CS Știința Bacău (2015–present)

== Honours and awards ==
=== Titles ===
- Romanian Championship – 2005

=== Individual awards ===
- 2003 Women's European Volleyball Championship – Best receiver (libero)

Awards
Preceded by	Best Receiver of Women's European Volleyball Championship; 2003	Succeeded by (Turkey) Gülden Kayalar Kuzubaşıoğlu
