= Ana Živojinović =

Serbian volleyball player

Personal information
- Full name: Ana Živojinović
- Nationality: Serbia
- Born: July 4, 1991 (age 35); Valjevo, SR Serbia, SFR Yugoslavia
- Height: 1.87 m (6 ft 2 in)
- Weight: 74 kg (163 lb)
- Spike: 280 cm (110 in)
- Block: 268 cm (106 in)

Volleyball information
- Position: Outside hitter
- Current club: (Serbia) OK Crvena Zvezda
- Number: 4

Career
Years	Teams
2005–2006; 2006–2012; 2012–2013; 2013–2015; 2015–2017; 2017–2018; 2018–2019; 2019–2020; 2021–2023; 2023–2024; 2024–present	(Serbia) Srbijanka Valjevo (Serbia) OK Vizura (Turkey) Beşiktaş JK (France) ASPTT Mulhouse (Greece) Olympiacos SFP (Turkey) Beylikdüzü (Romania) CSM Volei Alba Blaj (Greece) Olympiacos SFP (Serbia) OK Crvena Zvezda (Romania) CSO Voluntari (Serbia) OK Crvena Zvezda

National team
Serbia
Honours
Women's volleyball
Representing Serbia
European Championship
Gold medal – first place	2011 Serbia / Italy	Team
World Grand Prix
Bronze medal – third place	2011 Macau	Team
Bronze medal – third place	2013 Sapporo	Team
European League
Gold medal – first place	2011 Istanbul	Team
- Last updated: 31 May 2017

Ana Živojinović (née Lazarević; born July 4, 1991) is a professional volleyball player from Serbia, who was a member of the Serbia women's national volleyball team that won the gold medal at the 2011 European Championship in Serbia and Italy. At club level, she plays for OK Crvena Zvezda in Serbian Volleyball League.

== Career ==
Ana Lazarević took her first steps in volleyball in 2005, in the Academy of Srbijanka of Valjevo, a club of her hometown. In Srbijanka she remained for only a year, since in 2006 she was transferred to Vizura. She remained for six years in the club of the Serbian capital, took the second place of the 2010–11 Serbian Championship, and was runners up of the Cup of Serbia in the same year as well.

In 2012, she decided to leave her homeland and travel to Turkey for Beşiktaş JK, but she remained there for just one season.

In 2013, Ana Lazarević was signed by ASPTT Mulhouse, a team of the town with the same name in France, where she remained for two years. With ASPTT Mulhouse she was awarded as Best Receiver in the 2014 edition of CEV Women's Challenge Cup, in the third place of her team in that year's competition.

In the summer of 2015, Lazarević moved to Greece and was transferred to Olympiacos Piraeus, where she remained until the summer of 2017. With the Red-whites of Piraeus she won the double twice (Hellenic Championship and Hellenic Cup) in the 2015–16 and 2016–17 seasons. Moreover, she was named the Most Valuable Player (M.V.P.) at the 2017 Hellenic Cup. At the same season she was runner up of the European Challenge Cup, in the incredible course of Olympiacos to the final of the competition.

After one year in Beylikdüzü of Istanbul for personal reasons, she moved in 2018 to Romanian Alba Blaj, with which she won both the Romanian championship and Cup, but also the Silver Medal of 2018–19 Women's CEV Cup.

In the summer of 2019, Ana Lazarević returned to Greece, to Olympiacos Piraeus as Ana Živojinović, after marrying water polo player Stefan Živojinović, who was also transferred to Olympiacos that same year.

In May 2021, after one year of absence due to pregnancy, she returned to Serbia and signed for OK Crvena Zvezda, club that she supports since childhood.

== International career ==
Ana Lazarević has been a member of the Serbian National Team since 2011. She has 30 entries (July 2015) and she has won two gold medals in European competitions as well as the bronze medal at the 2013 Volleyball World Grand Prix.

== Sporting achievements ==
=== National team ===
- 2011 Women's European Volleyball Championship (Serbia / Italy)
- 2011 Women's European Volleyball League (Istanbul)
- 2013 FIVB World Grand Prix (Sapporo)

=== Clubs ===
==== International competitions ====
- 2013/2014 CEV Women's Challenge Cup, with ASPTT Mulhouse
- 2016/2017 CEV Women's Challenge Cup, with Olympiacos Piraeus
- 2018/2019 Women's CEV Cup, with CSM Volei Alba Blaj

==== National championships ====
- 2015/2016 Hellenic Championship, with Olympiacos Piraeus
- 2016/2017 Hellenic Championship, with Olympiacos Piraeus
- 2018/2019 Romanian Championship, with CSM Volei Alba Blaj

==== National trophies ====
- 2015/2016 Hellenic Cup, with Olympiacos Piraeus
- 2016/2017 Hellenic Cup, with Olympiacos Piraeus
- 2018/2019 Romanian Cup, with CSM Volei Alba Blaj

=== Individuals ===
- 2014 CEV Women's Challenge Cup: Best receiver
- 2017 Hellenic Cup Final four: M.V.P.
