= Sobo =

Sobo may refer to:

== Places ==
- Sobo, La Brea, Trinidad and Tobago
- Mount Sobo, Japan
- SoBo or South Mumbai

== Other ==
- Sobo (deity)
- Sobo language (disambiguation)
- Alexandra Sobo (born 1987), Romanian volleyball player
- Sobo, an app for recording and distributing sound snippets, developed by Alan Braverman
