= Alina Albu =

Romanian volleyball player (born 1983)

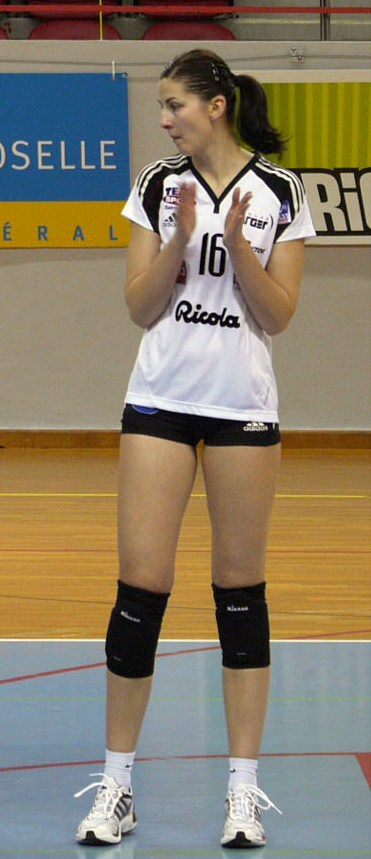

Personal information
- Full name: Alina Speranţa Ilie Albu
- Nationality: Romania
- Born: 6 September 1983 (age 43); Baia Mare, Romania
- Height: 1.92 m (6 ft 4 in)
- Weight: 75 kg (165 lb)
- Spike: 3.07 m (121 in)
- Block: 2.97 m (117 in)

Volleyball information
- Position: Middle Blocker
- Current club: ASPTT Mulhouse
- Number: 16 (club and national team)

National team
2002	Romania
- Last updated: 5 January 2017

Alina Speranţa Ilie Albu (born 6 September 1983 in Baia Mare) is a Romanian female volleyball player, who plays as a middle blocker. She was part of the Romania women's national volleyball team.

She participated at the 2002 FIVB Volleyball Women's World Championship in Germany. On club level she plays for ASPTT Mulhouse in France.

== Clubs ==
- (Romania) Știința Bacău (1999–2000)
- (Romania) Dinamo București (2000–2005)
- (Romania) Metal Galați (2005–2009)
- (France) Terville Florange (2009–2010)
- (France) ASPTT Mulhouse (2010–2017)
- (Romania) Dinamo București (2018–2019)

== Honours and awards ==
- Romanian Championship (3): 2007, 2008, 2009
- Romanian Cup (3): 2007, 2008, 2009
