= Alexandra Sobo =

Romanian volleyball player (born 1987)

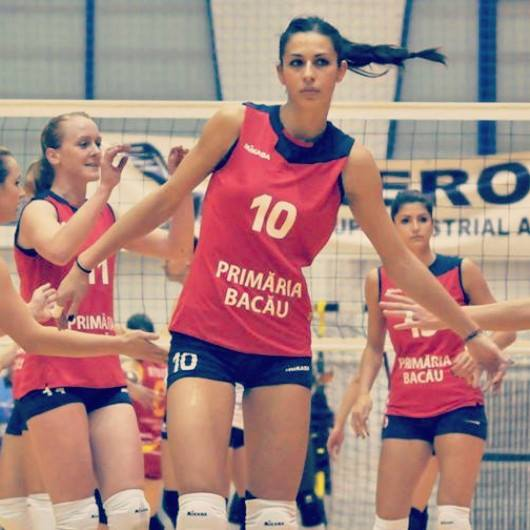

Personal information
- Nationality: Romanian
- Born: 25 April 1987 (age 39)
- Hometown: Cluj Napoca
- Height: 192 cm (6 ft 4 in)
- Weight: 74 kg (163 lb)

Volleyball information
- Position: middle blocker
- Number: 10 (national team)

Career
Years	Teams
2016	CSM Târgoviște (women's volleyball)

National team
2015	Romania

Alexandra Sobo (born 25 April 1987) is a Romanian female volleyball player, playing the middle blocker position. She is part of the Romania women's national volleyball team. Throughout the last 14 years her stature combined with her long arms (2 metres wingspan) and elevation has made Sobo one of the most powerful middle blockers in Europe, with top blocking abilities and precise one-foot attacks. Stats from the 2015 Women's European Volleyball Championship rank her among the top centers of the game.

Sobo first played in the Romanian national league at the age of 15, while her first international appearance was in the 2003/2004 Women's CEV Cup. She has won the Romanian National League two times, as well as winning the Romanian Cup twice. Internationally, Alexandra Sobo has played in most of the European Cups for clubs, including CEV Women's Champions League, Women's CEV Cup, CEV Women's Challenge Cup and BVA Cup. In the 2014/2015 CEV Champions League Sobo was selected for the dream team of Leg 5 as the middle blocker, after defeating Nantes VB 3-1.

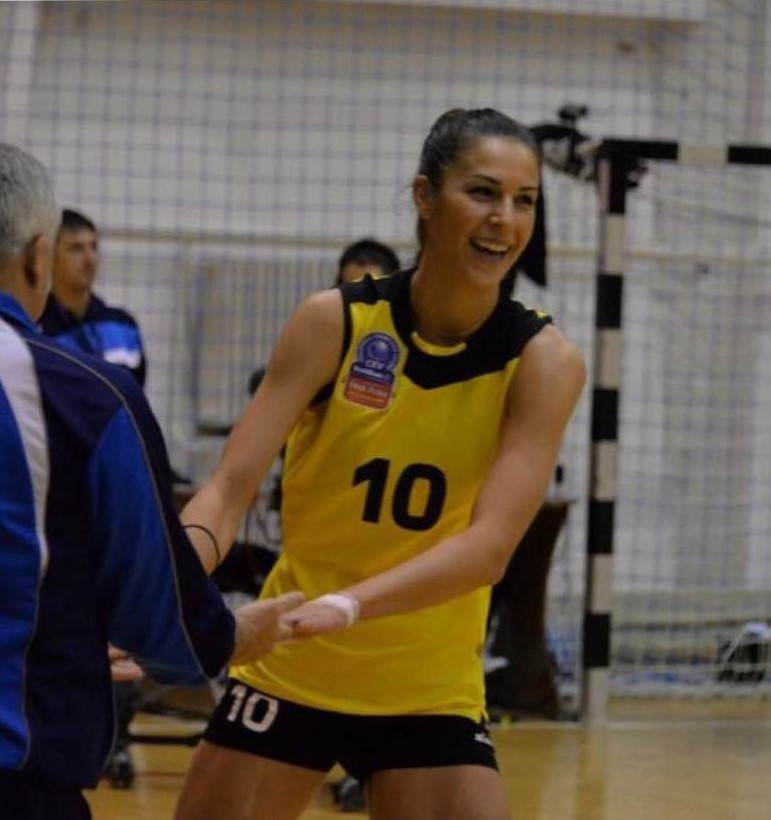
Alexandra Sobo playing for Stiinta Bacau 2014

She competed at the 2015 Women's European Volleyball Championship, where she started each of the group games. However Romania was eliminated in the group round, after playing against Germany, Serbia and the Czech Republic. On club level she has played the last two seasons for CSM Târgoviște (women's volleyball), team that won the Romanian Cup and the Romanian national league 2nd place in the 2015/2016 season as well as the Romanian Supercup in 2016, after defeating CS Volei Alba-Blaj.

Previously Sobo has also played for Stiinta Bacau and Unic LPS Piatra Neamt
