= 2022–23 CEV Women's Champions League =

- League: CEV Champions League
- Sport: Volleyball
- Duration: Qualifying round: 18 October – 23 November 2022; Main tournament: 6 December 2022 – May 2023
- Number of matches: 79
- Number of teams: 25 (8 qual. + 17 main tourn.)
- Total attendance: 166,085
- Average attendance: 2,157

Finals
- Venue: (Italy) Pala Alpitour, Turin
- Champions: (Turkey) Vakifbank Istanbul
- Runners-up: (Turkey) Eczacıbaşı Dynavit
- Finals MVP: (Italy) Paola Egonu

CEV Women's Champions League seasons
- ← 2021–22 2023–24 →

The 2022–23 CEV Women's Champions League was the 63rd edition of the highest level European volleyball club competition organised by the European Volleyball Confederation.

== Teams ==
- TH: Champions League title holders
- 1st, 2nd, 3rd.: Final position in national leagues of the previous season
- Q : Qualified for League Round

Qualified teams for 2022–23 CEV Women's Champions League (by entry round)
League round
| (Italy) Imoco Volley Conegliano (1st) | (Turkey) Eczacıbaşı Dynavit (3rd) | (France) Volley Mulhouse Alsace (2nd) | (Ukraine) SC "Prometey" Dnipro (1st) |
| (Italy) Vero Volley Milano (2nd) | (Poland) Grupa Azoty Chemik Police (1st) | (Germany) Allianz MTV Stuttgart (1st) | (Bulgaria) Maritza Plovdiv (1st) |
| (Italy) Igor Gorgonzola Novara (3rd) | (Poland) Developres Rzeszów (2nd) | (Germany) SC Potsdam (2nd) | |
| (Turkey) VakıfBank Istanbul (1st) ^{TH} | (Poland) ŁKS Commercecon Łódź (3rd) | (Romania) CSM Volei Alba Blaj (1st) | |
| (Turkey) Fenerbahçe Opet (2nd) | (France) Volero Le Cannet (1st) | (Romania) CSM Targoviste (2nd) | |
Qualifying rounds
| (Belgium) VDK Gent (1st) | (Bosnia and Herzegovina) MOK Jedinstvo Brčko (1st) | (Croatia) Mladost Zagreb (1st) | (Spain) CV Haris (1st) ^{Q} |
| (Finland) Hämeenlinnan (3rd) | (Hungary) Vasas Óbuda Budapest (1st) ^{Q} | (Slovenia) Calcit Kamnik (1st) | (Serbia) OK Crvena Zvezda (1st) ^{Q} |

== Pools composition ==
The Drawing of Lots was held on 16 September 2022 in Brussels.

| Pool A | Pool B | Pool C |
|---|---|---|
| Imoco Volley | Vero Volley Milano | VakıfBank S.K. |
| Developres Rzeszów | Volero Le Cannet | Igor Gorgonzola Novara |
| ASPTT Mulhouse | CSM Volei Alba Blaj | SC Potsdam |
| Vasas Budapest | SC "Prometey" Dnipro | OK Crvena Zvezda |

| Pool D | Pool E |
|---|---|
| Fenerbahçe Opet Istanbul | Grupa Azoty Chemik Police |
| ŁKS Commercecon Łódź | Eczacıbaşı Dynavit |
| Allianz MTV Stuttgart | CSM Targoviste |
| CV Haris | Maritza Plovdiv |

== League round ==
- 20 teams compete in the League round.
- The teams are split into 5 groups, each one featuring four teams.
- The top team in each pool automatically qualifies for the quarterfinals.
- All 2nd placed teams and the best 3rd placed team qualify for the playoffs.
- The remaining 3rd placed teams will compete in the quarterfinals of the 2022–23 CEV Cup.
- All times are local.

=== Pool A ===
| Pos | Team | Pld | W | L | Pts | SW | SL | SR | SPW | SPL | SPR | Qualification |
|---|---|---|---|---|---|---|---|---|---|---|---|---|
| 1 | (Italy) Imoco Volley | 6 | 6 | 0 | 18 | 18 | 2 | 9.000 | 488 | 367 | 1.330 | Quarterfinals |
| 2 | (Poland) Developres Rzeszów | 6 | 4 | 2 | 11 | 13 | 9 | 1.444 | 482 | 444 | 1.086 | Playoffs |
| 3 | (France) ASPTT Mulhouse | 6 | 2 | 4 | 6 | 6 | 14 | 0.429 | 401 | 478 | 0.839 | 2022–23 CEV Cup |
| 4 | (Hungary) Vasas Budapest | 6 | 0 | 6 | 1 | 6 | 18 | 0.333 | 482 | 564 | 0.855 | |

| Date | Time | | Score | | Set 1 | Set 2 | Set 3 | Set 4 | Set 5 | Total | Report |
|---|---|---|---|---|---|---|---|---|---|---|---|
| 7 Dec | 18:30 | Imoco Volley (Italy) | 3–0 | (Hungary) Vasas Budapest | 25–15 | 25–16 | 25–19 | | | 75–50 | Report |
| 6 Dec | 18:00 | Developres Rzeszów (Poland) | 3–0 | (France) ASPTT Mulhouse | 25–19 | 25–19 | 25–20 | | | 75–58 | Report |
| 21 Dec | 18:00 | ASPTT Mulhouse (France) | 0–3 | (Italy) Imoco Volley | 22–25 | 14–25 | 18–25 | | | 54–75 | Report |
| 20 Dec | 18:15 | Vasas Budapest (Hungary) | 2–3 | (Poland) Developres Rzeszów | 25–20 | 28–26 | 20–25 | 20–25 | 9–15 | 102–111 | Report |
| 10 Jan | 18:00 | Developres Rzeszów (Poland) | 1–3 | (Italy) Imoco Volley | 25–16 | 18–25 | 16–25 | 16–25 | | 75–91 | Report |
| 11 Jan | 18:15 | Vasas Budapest (Hungary) | 1–3 | (France) ASPTT Mulhouse | 23–25 | 23–25 | 25–16 | 24–26 | | 95–92 | Report |
| 17 Jan | 18:00 | Developres Rzeszów (Poland) | 3–1 | (Hungary) Vasas Budapest | 25–10 | 18–25 | 25–13 | 25–23 | | 93–71 | Report |
| 18 Jan | 20:30 | Imoco Volley (Italy) | 3–0 | (France) ASPTT Mulhouse | 25–15 | 25–19 | 25–20 | | | 75–54 | Report |
| 31 Jan | 18:15 | Vasas Budapest (Hungary) | 1–3 | (Italy) Imoco Volley | 17–25 | 25–22 | 21–25 | 18–25 | | 81–97 | Report |
| 31 Jan | 19:00 | ASPTT Mulhouse (France) | 0–3 | (Poland) Developres Rzeszów | 17–25 | 19–25 | 11–25 | | | 47–75 | Report |
| 8 Feb | 20:30 | Imoco Volley (Italy) | 3–0 | (Poland) Developres Rzeszów | 25–20 | 25–17 | 25–16 | | | 75–53 | Report |
| 8 Feb | 19:00 | ASPTT Mulhouse (France) | 3–1 | (Hungary) Vasas Budapest | 25–18 | 25–23 | 21–25 | 25–17 | | 96–83 | Report |

=== Pool B ===
| Pos | Team | Pld | W | L | Pts | SW | SL | SR | SPW | SPL | SPR | Qualification |
|---|---|---|---|---|---|---|---|---|---|---|---|---|
| 1 | (Italy) Vero Volley Milano | 6 | 5 | 1 | 16 | 17 | 6 | 2.833 | 534 | 452 | 1.181 | Quarterfinals |
| 2 | (France) Volero Le Cannet | 6 | 4 | 2 | 11 | 15 | 11 | 1.364 | 554 | 541 | 1.024 | Playoffs |
| 3 | (Romania) CSM Volei Alba Blaj | 6 | 2 | 4 | 7 | 10 | 13 | 0.769 | 493 | 518 | 0.952 | 2022–23 CEV Cup |
| 4 | (Ukraine) SC "Prometey" Dnipro | 6 | 1 | 5 | 2 | 5 | 17 | 0.294 | 443 | 513 | 0.864 | |

| Date | Time | | Score | | Set 1 | Set 2 | Set 3 | Set 4 | Set 5 | Total | Report |
|---|---|---|---|---|---|---|---|---|---|---|---|
| 7 Dec | 20:00 | Vero Volley Milano (Italy) | 3–0 | (Ukraine) SC "Prometey" Dnipro | 25–17 | 25–20 | 25–21 | | | 75–58 | Report |
| 7 Dec | 20:00 | Volero Le Cannet (France) | 3–2 | (Romania) CSM Volei Alba Blaj | 25–23 | 18–25 | 23–25 | 25–21 | 15–7 | 106–101 | Report |
| 21 Dec | 19:00 | CSM Volei Alba Blaj (Romania) | 1–3 | (Italy) Vero Volley Milano | 25–20 | 16–25 | 21–25 | 21–25 | | 83–95 | Report |
| 20 Dec | 18:00 | SC "Prometey" Dnipro (Ukraine) | 3–2 | (France) Volero Le Cannet | 24–26 | 17–25 | 25–14 | 25–15 | 15–10 | 106–90 | Report |
| 10 Jan | 18:00 | SC "Prometey" Dnipro (Ukraine) | 0–3 | (Romania) CSM Volei Alba Blaj | 15–25 | 22–25 | 21–25 | | | 58–75 | Report |
| 12 Jan | 20:00 | Volero Le Cannet (France) | 3–2 | (Italy) Vero Volley Milano | 23–25 | 25–20 | 14–25 | 25–15 | 15–6 | 102–91 | Report |
| 18 Jan | 20:00 | Volero Le Cannet (France) | 3–0 | (Ukraine) SC "Prometey" Dnipro | 25–15 | 25–22 | 25–22 | | | 75–59 | Report |
| 18 Jan | 20:00 | Vero Volley Milano (Italy) | 3–0 | (Romania) CSM Volei Alba Blaj | 25–16 | 25–18 | 25–16 | | | 75–50 | Report |
| 31 Jan | 18:00 | SC "Prometey" Dnipro (Ukraine) | 1–3 | (Italy) Vero Volley Milano | 19–25 | 18–25 | 26–24 | 14–25 | | 77–99 | Report |
| 1 Feb | 19:00 | CSM Volei Alba Blaj (Romania) | 1–3 | (France) Volero Le Cannet | 15–25 | 20–25 | 25–22 | 25–27 | | 85–99 | Report |
| 8 Feb | 20:00 | Vero Volley Milano (Italy) | 3–1 | (France) Volero Le Cannet | 23–25 | 26–24 | 25–18 | 25–15 | | 99–82 | Report |
| 8 Feb | 19:00 | CSM Volei Alba Blaj (Romania) | 3–1 | (Ukraine) SC "Prometey" Dnipro | 25–23 | 25–20 | 24–26 | 25–16 | | 99–85 | Report |

=== Pool C ===
| Pos | Team | Pld | W | L | Pts | SW | SL | SR | SPW | SPL | SPR | Qualification |
|---|---|---|---|---|---|---|---|---|---|---|---|---|
| 1 | (Italy) Igor Gorgonzola Novara | 6 | 5 | 1 | 15 | 15 | 6 | 2.500 | 503 | 433 | 1.162 | Quarterfinals |
| 2 | (Turkey) VakıfBank S.K. | 6 | 4 | 2 | 13 | 15 | 7 | 2.143 | 522 | 462 | 1.130 | Playoffs |
| 3 | (Germany) SC Potsdam | 6 | 3 | 3 | 7 | 12 | 14 | 0.857 | 563 | 581 | 0.969 | 2022–23 CEV Cup |
| 4 | (Serbia) OK Crvena Zvezda | 6 | 0 | 6 | 1 | 3 | 18 | 0.167 | 396 | 508 | 0.780 | |

| Date | Time | | Score | | Set 1 | Set 2 | Set 3 | Set 4 | Set 5 | Total | Report |
|---|---|---|---|---|---|---|---|---|---|---|---|
| 7 Dec | 17:00 | VakıfBank S.K. (Turkey) | 3–0 | (Serbia) OK Crvena Zvezda | 25–15 | 25–21 | 25–9 | | | 75–45 | Report |
| 6 Dec | 20:00 | Igor Gorgonzola Novara (Italy) | 3–1 | (Germany) SC Potsdam | 25–15 | 25–17 | 24–26 | 25–19 | | 99–77 | Report |
| 21 Dec | 19:30 | SC Potsdam (Germany) | 1–3 | (Turkey) VakıfBank S.K. | 22–25 | 33–35 | 25–20 | 21–25 | | 101–105 | Report |
| 20 Dec | 19:00 | OK Crvena Zvezda (Serbia) | 0–3 | (Italy) Igor Gorgonzola Novara | 17–25 | 20–25 | 25–27 | | | 62–77 | Report |
| 10 Jan | 20:00 | Igor Gorgonzola Novara (Italy) | 0–3 | (Turkey) VakıfBank S.K. | 21–25 | 22–25 | 19–25 | | | 62–75 | Report |
| 12 Jan | 20:00 | OK Crvena Zvezda (Serbia) | 2–3 | (Germany) SC Potsdam | 25–21 | 21–25 | 17–25 | 25–23 | 9–15 | 97–109 | Report |
| 17 Jan | 20:00 | Igor Gorgonzola Novara (Italy) | 3–0 | (Serbia) OK Crvena Zvezda | 25–17 | 25–15 | 25–22 | | | 75–54 | Report |
| 19 Jan | 19:00 | VakıfBank S.K. (Turkey) | 2–3 | (Germany) SC Potsdam | 25–19 | 25–19 | 23–25 | 20–25 | 10–15 | 103–103 | Report |
| 31 Jan | 19:00 | OK Crvena Zvezda (Serbia) | 0–3 | (Turkey) VakıfBank S.K. | 23–25 | 18–25 | 18–25 | | | 59–75 | Report |
| 31 Jan | 19:30 | SC Potsdam (Germany) | 1–3 | (Italy) Igor Gorgonzola Novara | 21–25 | 17–25 | 25–23 | 13–25 | | 76–98 | Report |
| 8 Feb | 19:30 | SC Potsdam (Germany) | 3–1 | (Serbia) OK Crvena Zvezda | 25–18 | 25–13 | 22–25 | 25–23 | | 97–79 | Report |
| 15 Feb | 19:30 | VakıfBank S.K. (Turkey) | 1–3 | (Italy) Igor Gorgonzola Novara | 19–25 | 25–17 | 22–25 | 23–25 | | 89–92 | Report |

=== Pool D ===
| Pos | Team | Pld | W | L | Pts | SW | SL | SR | SPW | SPL | SPR | Qualification |
|---|---|---|---|---|---|---|---|---|---|---|---|---|
| 1 | (Germany) Allianz MTV Stuttgart | 6 | 5 | 1 | 13 | 16 | 7 | 2.286 | 520 | 458 | 1.135 | Quarterfinals |
| 2 | (Turkey) Fenerbahçe Opet Istanbul | 6 | 4 | 2 | 13 | 15 | 7 | 2.143 | 514 | 463 | 1.110 | Playoffs |
| 3 | (Poland) ŁKS Commercecon Łódź | 6 | 3 | 3 | 10 | 11 | 10 | 1.100 | 476 | 451 | 1.055 | Playoffs |
| 4 | (Spain) CV Haris | 6 | 0 | 6 | 0 | 0 | 18 | 0.000 | 315 | 453 | 0.695 | |

| Date | Time | | Score | | Set 1 | Set 2 | Set 3 | Set 4 | Set 5 | Total | Report |
|---|---|---|---|---|---|---|---|---|---|---|---|
| 6 Dec | 18:30 | Fenerbahçe Opet Istanbul (Turkey) | 3–0 | (Spain) CV Haris | 25–17 | 27–25 | 25–14 | | | 77–56 | Report |
| 7 Dec | 18:00 | ŁKS Commercecon Łódź (Poland) | 0–3 | (Germany) Allianz MTV Stuttgart | 23–25 | 12–25 | 20–25 | | | 55–75 | Report |
| 21 Dec | 19:00 | Allianz MTV Stuttgart (Germany) | 3–2 | (Turkey) Fenerbahçe Opet Istanbul | 25–22 | 25–23 | 18–25 | 22–25 | 15–10 | 105–105 | Report |
| 20 Dec | 19:30 | CV Haris (Spain) | 0–3 | (Poland) ŁKS Commercecon Łódź | 17–25 | 21–25 | 18–25 | | | 56–75 | Report |
| 11 Jan | 18:00 | ŁKS Commercecon Łódź (Poland) | 3–1 | (Turkey) Fenerbahçe Opet Istanbul | 25–21 | 22–25 | 25–16 | 25–19 | | 97–81 | Report |
| 12 Jan | 19:00 | CV Haris (Spain) | 0–3 | (Germany) Allianz MTV Stuttgart | 19–25 | 15–25 | 18–25 | | | 52–75 | Report |
| 18 Jan | 17:30 | Fenerbahçe Opet Istanbul (Turkey) | 3–1 | (Germany) Allianz MTV Stuttgart | 25–20 | 22–25 | 25–18 | 25–16 | | 97–79 | Report |
| 19 Jan | 20:30 | ŁKS Commercecon Łódź (Poland) | 3–0 | (Spain) CV Haris | 25–16 | 25–14 | 25–20 | | | 75–50 | Report |
| 1 Feb | 19:00 | Allianz MTV Stuttgart (Germany) | 3–2 | (Poland) ŁKS Commercecon Łódź | 32–30 | 18–25 | 25–15 | 19–25 | 17–15 | 111–110 | Report |
| 2 Feb | 18:00 | CV Haris (Spain) | 0–3 | (Turkey) Fenerbahçe Opet Istanbul | 18–25 | 20–25 | 24–26 | | | 62–76 | Report |
| 8 Feb | 19:00 | Allianz MTV Stuttgart (Germany) | 3–0 | (Spain) CV Haris | 25–8 | 25–16 | 25–15 | | | 75–39 | Report |
| 15 Feb | 15:00 | Fenerbahçe Opet Istanbul (Turkey) | 3–0 | (Poland) ŁKS Commercecon Łódź | 25–22 | 25–16 | 28–26 | | | 78–64 | Report |

=== Pool E ===
| Pos | Team | Pld | W | L | Pts | SW | SL | SR | SPW | SPL | SPR | Qualification |
|---|---|---|---|---|---|---|---|---|---|---|---|---|
| 1 | (Turkey) Eczacıbaşı Dynavit | 6 | 6 | 0 | 18 | 18 | 2 | 9.000 | 497 | 365 | 1.362 | Quarterfinals |
| 2 | (Poland) Grupa Azoty Chemik Police | 6 | 4 | 2 | 10 | 14 | 10 | 1.400 | 538 | 503 | 1.070 | Playoffs |
| 3 | (Romania) CSM Targoviste | 6 | 2 | 4 | 8 | 10 | 12 | 0.833 | 469 | 471 | 0.996 | 2022–23 CEV Cup |
| 4 | (Bulgaria) Maritza Plovdiv | 6 | 0 | 6 | 0 | 0 | 18 | 0.000 | 286 | 451 | 0.634 | |

| Date | Time | | Score | | Set 1 | Set 2 | Set 3 | Set 4 | Set 5 | Total | Report |
|---|---|---|---|---|---|---|---|---|---|---|---|
| 7 Dec | 20:30 | Grupa Azoty Chemik Police (Poland) | 3–0 | (Bulgaria) Maritza Plovdiv | 25–18 | 25–23 | 25–11 | | | 75–52 | Report |
| 7 Dec | 19:00 | Eczacıbaşı Dynavit (Turkey) | 3–0 | (Romania) CSM Targoviste | 25–18 | 25–14 | 25–22 | | | 75–54 | Report |
| 21 Dec | 18:00 | CSM Targoviste (Romania) | 2–3 | (Poland) Grupa Azoty Chemik Police | 17–25 | 19–25 | 26–24 | 26–24 | 16–18 | 104–116 | Report |
| 20 Dec | 18:00 | Maritza Plovdiv (Bulgaria) | 0–3 | (Turkey) Eczacıbaşı Dynavit | 20–25 | 11–25 | 19–25 | | | 50–75 | Report |
| 11 Jan | 19:00 | Eczacıbaşı Dynavit (Turkey) | 3–1 | (Poland) Grupa Azoty Chemik Police | 21–25 | 25–14 | 25–20 | 25–17 | | 96–76 | Report |
| 11 Jan | 18:00 | Maritza Plovdiv (Bulgaria) | 0–3 | (Romania) CSM Targoviste | 14–25 | 15–25 | 19–25 | | | 48–75 | Report |
| 18 Jan | 18:00 | Grupa Azoty Chemik Police (Poland) | 3–2 | (Romania) CSM Targoviste | 29–27 | 25–20 | 23–25 | 13–25 | 15–4 | 105–101 | Report |
| 18 Jan | 20:00 | Eczacıbaşı Dynavit (Turkey) | 3–0 | (Bulgaria) Maritza Plovdiv | 25–14 | 25–16 | 25–5 | | | 75–35 | Report |
| 1 Feb | 18:30 | Maritza Plovdiv (Bulgaria) | 0–3 | (Poland) Grupa Azoty Chemik Police | 20–25 | 9–25 | 20–25 | | | 49–75 | Report |
| 2 Feb | 18:00 | CSM Targoviste (Romania) | 0–3 | (Turkey) Eczacıbaşı Dynavit | 22–25 | 14–25 | 23–25 | | | 59–75 | Report |
| 8 Feb | 18:00 | Grupa Azoty Chemik Police (Poland) | 1–3 | (Turkey) Eczacıbaşı Dynavit | 28–26 | 18–25 | 23–25 | 22–25 | | 91–101 | Report |
| 8 Feb | 18:00 | CSM Targoviste (Romania) | 3–0 | (Bulgaria) Maritza Plovdiv | 25–18 | 25–10 | 26–24 | | | 76–52 | Report |

=== First place ranking ===
| Pos | Team | Pld | W | L | Pts | SW | SL | SR | SPW | SPL | SPR | Qualification |
|---|---|---|---|---|---|---|---|---|---|---|---|---|
| 1 | (Turkey) Eczacıbaşı Dynavit | 6 | 6 | 0 | 18 | 18 | 2 | 9.000 | 497 | 365 | 1.362 | Quarterfinals |
| 2 | (Italy) Imoco Volley | 6 | 6 | 0 | 18 | 18 | 2 | 9.000 | 488 | 367 | 1.330 | Quarterfinals |
| 3 | (Italy) Vero Volley Milano | 6 | 5 | 1 | 16 | 17 | 6 | 2.833 | 534 | 452 | 1.181 | Quarterfinals |
| 4 | (Italy) Igor Gorgonzola Novara | 6 | 5 | 1 | 15 | 15 | 6 | 2.500 | 503 | 433 | 1.162 | Quarterfinals |
| 5 | (Germany) Allianz MTV Stuttgart | 6 | 5 | 1 | 13 | 16 | 7 | 2.286 | 520 | 458 | 1.135 | Quarterfinals |

=== Second place ranking ===
| Pos | Team | Pld | W | L | Pts | SW | SL | SR | SPW | SPL | SPR | Qualification |
|---|---|---|---|---|---|---|---|---|---|---|---|---|
| 1 | (Turkey) VakıfBank S.K. | 6 | 4 | 2 | 13 | 15 | 7 | 2.143 | 522 | 462 | 1.130 | Playoffs |
| 2 | (Turkey) Fenerbahçe Opet Istanbul | 6 | 4 | 2 | 13 | 15 | 7 | 2.143 | 514 | 463 | 1.110 | Playoffs |
| 3 | (Poland) Developres Rzeszów | 6 | 4 | 2 | 11 | 13 | 9 | 1.444 | 482 | 444 | 1.086 | Playoffs |
| 4 | (France) Volero Le Cannet | 6 | 4 | 2 | 11 | 15 | 11 | 1.364 | 554 | 541 | 1.024 | Playoffs |
| 5 | (Poland) Grupa Azoty Chemik Police | 6 | 4 | 2 | 10 | 14 | 10 | 1.400 | 538 | 503 | 1.070 | Playoffs |

=== Third place ranking ===
| Pos | Team | Pld | W | L | Pts | SW | SL | SR | SPW | SPL | SPR | Qualification |
|---|---|---|---|---|---|---|---|---|---|---|---|---|
| 1 | (Poland) ŁKS Commercecon Łódź | 6 | 3 | 3 | 10 | 11 | 10 | 1.100 | 476 | 451 | 1.055 | Playoffs |
| 2 | (Germany) SC Potsdam | 6 | 3 | 3 | 7 | 12 | 14 | 0.857 | 563 | 581 | 0.969 | 2022–23 CEV Cup |
| 3 | (Romania) CSM Targoviste | 6 | 2 | 4 | 8 | 10 | 12 | 0.833 | 469 | 471 | 0.996 | 2022–23 CEV Cup |
| 4 | (Romania) CSM Volei Alba Blaj | 6 | 2 | 4 | 7 | 10 | 13 | 0.769 | 493 | 518 | 0.952 | 2022–23 CEV Cup |
| 5 | (France) ASPTT Mulhouse | 6 | 2 | 4 | 6 | 6 | 14 | 0.429 | 401 | 478 | 0.839 | 2022–23 CEV Cup |

== Playoff 6 ==
- The winners of the ties qualify for the quarterfinals.
- In case the teams are tied after two legs, a Golden Set is played immediately at the completion of the second leg.
- All times are local.

| Team 1 | Agg. | Team 2 | 1st leg | 2nd leg | Golden Set |
|---|---|---|---|---|---|
| ŁKS Commercecon Łódź (Poland) | 0–6 | (Turkey) VakıfBank S.K. | 0–3 | 0–3 | |
| Grupa Azoty Chemik Police (Poland) | 1–5 | (Turkey) Fenerbahçe Opet Istanbul | 2–3 | 1–3 | |
| Volero Le Cannet (France) | 3–3 | (Poland) Developres Rzeszów | 3–0 | 0–3 | 13–15 |

=== First leg ===
| Date | Time | | Score | | Set 1 | Set 2 | Set 3 | Set 4 | Set 5 | Total | Report |
|---|---|---|---|---|---|---|---|---|---|---|---|
| 22 Feb | 20:00 | ŁKS Commercecon Łódź (Poland) | 0–3 | (Turkey) VakıfBank S.K. | 22–25 | 12–25 | 24–26 | | | 58–76 | Report |
| 21 Feb | 18:00 | Grupa Azoty Chemik Police (Poland) | 2–3 | (Turkey) Fenerbahçe Opet Istanbul | 14–25 | 29–27 | 23–25 | 25–22 | 10–15 | 101–114 | Report |
| 23 Feb | 20:00 | Volero Le Cannet (France) | 3–0 | (Poland) Developres Rzeszów | 25–15 | 29–27 | 25–22 | | | 79–64 | Report |

=== Second leg ===
| Date | Time | | Score | | Set 1 | Set 2 | Set 3 | Set 4 | Set 5 | Total | Report |
|---|---|---|---|---|---|---|---|---|---|---|---|
| 1 Mar | 20:00 | VakıfBank S.K. (Turkey) | 3–0 | (Poland) ŁKS Commercecon Łódź | 25–23 | 28–26 | 25–23 | | | 78–72 | Report |
| 2 Mar | 18:30 | Fenerbahçe Opet Istanbul (Turkey) | 3–1 | (Poland) Grupa Azoty Chemik Police | 25–23 | 25–19 | 21–25 | 25–18 | | 96–85 | Report |
| 2 Mar | 20:00 | Developres Rzeszów (Poland) | 3–0 | (France) Volero Le Cannet | 25–15 | 29–27 | 26–24 | | | 80–66 | Report |
| Golden set | | Developres Rzeszów (Poland) | 15–13 | (France) Volero Le Cannet | | | | | | | |

== Quarterfinals ==
- The winners of the ties qualify for the semifinals.
- In case the teams are tied after two legs, a Golden Set is played immediately at the completion of the second leg.
- All times are local.

| Team 1 | Agg. | Team 2 | 1st leg | 2nd leg |
|---|---|---|---|---|
| VakıfBank S.K. (Turkey) | 5–1 | (Italy) Vero Volley Milano | 3–0 | 3–2 |
| Fenerbahçe Opet Istanbul (Turkey) | 4–2 | (Italy) Imoco Volley | 3–0 | 2–3 |
| Allianz MTV Stuttgart (Germany) | 0–6 | (Italy) Igor Gorgonzola Novara | 1–3 | 0–3 |
| Developres Rzeszów (Poland) | 1–5 | (Turkey) Eczacıbaşı Dynavit | 1–3 | 2–3 |

=== First leg ===
| Date | Time | | Score | | Set 1 | Set 2 | Set 3 | Set 4 | Set 5 | Total | Report |
|---|---|---|---|---|---|---|---|---|---|---|---|
| 15 Mar | 19:30 | VakıfBank S.K. (Turkey) | 3–0 | (Italy) Vero Volley Milano | 25–18 | 25–19 | 25–17 | | | 75–54 | Report |
| 16 Mar | 19:00 | Fenerbahçe Opet Istanbul (Turkey) | 3–0 | (Italy) Imoco Volley | 25–19 | 25–17 | 25–19 | | | 75–55 | Report |
| 14 Mar | 19:00 | Allianz MTV Stuttgart (Germany) | 1–3 | (Italy) Igor Gorgonzola Novara | 25–21 | 16–25 | 21–25 | 23–25 | | 85–96 | Report |
| 14 Mar | 18:00 | Developres Rzeszów (Poland) | 1–3 | (Turkey) Eczacıbaşı Dynavit | 19–25 | 25–22 | 16–25 | 26–28 | | 86–100 | Report |

=== Second leg ===
| Date | Time | | Score | | Set 1 | Set 2 | Set 3 | Set 4 | Set 5 | Total | Report |
|---|---|---|---|---|---|---|---|---|---|---|---|
| 21 Mar | 20:00 | Vero Volley Milano (Italy) | 2–3 | (Turkey) VakıfBank S.K. | 25–18 | 22–25 | 25–22 | 21–25 | 11–15 | 104–105 | Report |
| 23 Mar | 20:30 | Imoco Volley (Italy) | 3–2 | (Turkey) Fenerbahçe Opet Istanbul | 23–25 | 15–25 | 25–23 | 25–20 | 15–13 | 103–106 | Report |
| 22 Mar | 20:00 | Igor Gorgonzola Novara (Italy) | 3–0 | (Germany) Allianz MTV Stuttgart | 25–18 | 25–19 | 25–21 | | | 75–58 | Report |
| 23 Mar | 19:00 | Eczacıbaşı Dynavit (Turkey) | 3–2 | (Poland) Developres Rzeszów | 20–25 | 25–19 | 24–26 | 25–21 | 15–8 | 109–99 | Report |

== Semifinals ==
- The winners of the ties qualify for the final.
- In case the teams are tied after two legs, a Golden Set is played immediately at the completion of the second leg.
- All times are local.

| Team 1 | Agg. | Team 2 | 1st leg | 2nd leg | Golden Set |
|---|---|---|---|---|---|
| VakıfBank S.K. (Turkey) | 3–3 | (Turkey) Fenerbahçe Opet Istanbul | 0–3 | 3–0 | 15–12 |
| Igor Gorgonzola Novara (Italy) | 2–4 | (Turkey) Eczacıbaşı Dynavit | 3–2 | 0–3 | |

=== First leg ===
| Date | Time | | Score | | Set 1 | Set 2 | Set 3 | Set 4 | Set 5 | Total | Report |
|---|---|---|---|---|---|---|---|---|---|---|---|
| 6 Apr | 18:30 | VakıfBank S.K. (Turkey) | 0–3 | (Turkey) Fenerbahçe Opet Istanbul | 10–25 | 23–25 | 20–25 | | | 53–75 | Report |
| 5 Apr | 19:00 | Igor Gorgonzola Novara (Italy) | 3–2 | (Turkey) Eczacıbaşı Dynavit | 25–23 | 25–19 | 20–25 | 17–25 | 16–14 | 103–106 | Report |

=== Second leg ===
| Date | Time | | Score | | Set 1 | Set 2 | Set 3 | Set 4 | Set 5 | Total | Report |
|---|---|---|---|---|---|---|---|---|---|---|---|
| 13 Apr | 19:00 | Fenerbahçe Opet Istanbul (Turkey) | 0–3 | (Turkey) VakıfBank S.K. | 22–25 | 14–25 | 22–25 | | | 58–75 | Report |
| Golden set | | Fenerbahçe Opet Istanbul (Turkey) | 12–15 | (Turkey) VakıfBank S.K. | | | | | | | |
| 12 Apr | 19:00 | Eczacıbaşı Dynavit (Turkey) | 3–0 | (Italy) Igor Gorgonzola Novara | 25–22 | 25–12 | 25–21 | | | 75–55 | Report |

== Final ==
- Place: Pala Alpitour, Turin
- Time:16:30

| Date | Time | | Score | | Set 1 | Set 2 | Set 3 | Set 4 | Set 5 | Total | Report |
|---|---|---|---|---|---|---|---|---|---|---|---|
| 20 May | 16:30 | Eczacıbaşı Dynavit (Turkey) | 1–3 | (Turkey) VakıfBank S.K. | 25–27 | 17–25 | 25–23 | 17–25 | | 84–100 | Report |
