= Bojana Milenković =

Serbian volleyball player

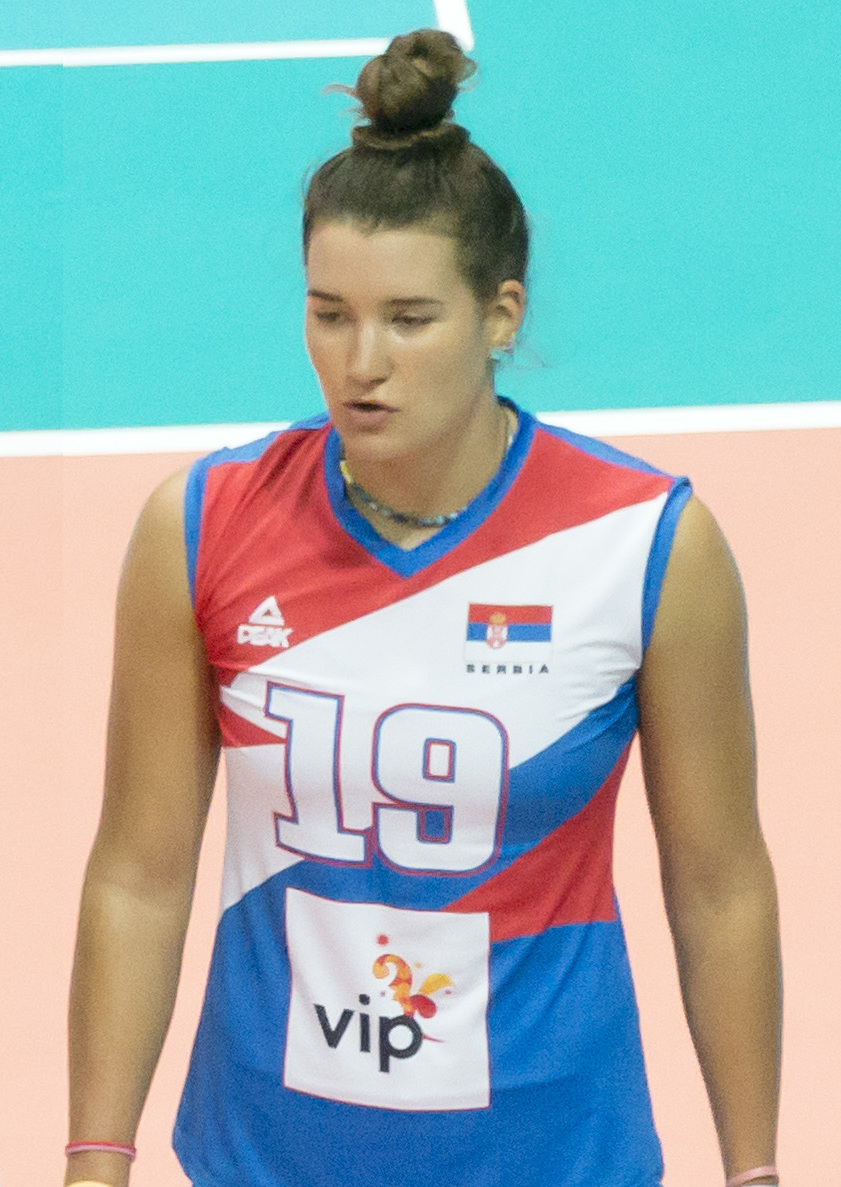
- Milenković in 2017

Personal information
- Nationality: Serbian
- Born: 6 March 1997 (age 29); Belgrade, Serbia, FR Yugoslavia
- Height: 1.85 m (6 ft 1 in)
- Weight: 70 kg (154 lb)
- Spike: 294 cm (116 in)
- Block: 288 cm (113 in)

Volleyball information
- Position: Outside hitter
- Current club: Fenerbahçe
- Number: 3

National team
Serbia
Honours
Women's volleyball
Representing Serbia
Olympic Games
Bronze medal – third place	2020 Tokyo	Team
FIVB World Championship
Gold medal – first place	2018 Japan	Team
Gold medal – first place	2022 Netherlands/Poland	Team
FIVB World Grand Prix
Bronze medal – third place	2017 Nanjing
FIVB Nations League
Bronze medal – third place	2022 Ankara	Team
European Championship
Gold medal – first place	2017 Azerbaijan/Georgia
Gold medal – first place	2019 Turkey
Silver medal – second place	2021 Serbia/Croatia/Bulgaria/Romania
Mediterranean Games
Bronze medal – third place	2026 Taranto

Bojana Milenković (born 6 March 1997) is a Serbian volleyball player who plays for Fenerbahçe and the Serbian national team. She is 1.85 m and an outside hitter.

She won a bronze medal with the Serbian women's national volleyball team at the 2020 Summer Olympics in Tokyo, Japan.

== International ==
Milenković participated at the 2017 Women's European Volleyball Championship and as well as the 2019 Women's European Volleyball Championship, winning gold on both occasions. She was named at Serbian 2026 Mediterranean Games squad where the team won bronze medal.

== Honors ==
=== Club ===
- OK Crvena Zvezda (2013–2018)
  - Volleyball League of Serbia: 2013–14, 2014–15, 2015–16
  - Serbian Cup: 2013–14, 2015–16, 2018–19
  - Serbian Super Cup: 2013, 2014, 2016
- (Italy) Pallavolo Scandicci (2018–2020)
- Altay VC (2020)
  - Kazakhstan Cup: 2020
- (Romania) Alba Blaj (2020–2021)
  - Cupa României: 2021
- (Poland) KPS Chemik Police (2021–2022)
  - Polish Championship: 2021-22
- (Romania) Alba Blaj (2022–2023)
  - Divizia A1: 2022–23
- Prometej Dnipro (2023–2024)
  - Ukraine SuperLiga: 2023–24
  - Ukraine Cup: 2023
  - Ukraine Super Cup: 2023
- (Turkey) Nilüfer Belediyespor (2024–2025)
- (Turkey) Fenerbahçe (2025–...)
  - Turkish Super Cup: 2025

=== Individual ===
- 2023-24 Ukraine SuperLiga Best Outside Hitter
- 2023 Ukraine Super Cup MVP
- 2020-21 Divizia A1 Best Outside Hitter
- 2016-17 Volleyball League of Serbia Best Server
- 2016-17 Volleyball League of Serbia Best Outside Hitter
- 2014-15 Serbian Cup Best Outside Hitter
