= Cristina Pîrv =

Romanian volleyball player (born 1972)

Personal information
- Full name: Cristina-Lucreția Pîrv
- Nationality: Romanian
- Born: 29 June 1972 (age 54); Turda, Romania
- Hometown: Turda
- Height: 1.85 m (6 ft 1 in)
- Weight: 61 kg (134 lb)
- Spike: 300 cm (118 in)
- Block: 285 cm (112 in)

Volleyball information
- Position: wing-spiker

Career
Years	Teams
1986–1991; 1991–1994; 1994–1995; 1995–1997; 1997–1998; 1998–1999; 1999–2002; 2002–2004; 2004–2005; 2005–2006	(Romania) Dinamo Bucharest (Italy) San Lazzaro (Italy) Sabelli Conad Fano (Italy) Virtus Reggio Calabria (Brazil) Minas Clube (Italy) Virtus Reggio Calabria (Brazil) Minas Clube (Italy) AGIL Novara (France) RC Cannes (Italy) Asystel Novara

National team
1992–2002	Romania
Honours
Women's volleyball
Representing Romania
Summer Universiade
Gold medal – first place	1993 Buffalo, New York	Team

Cristina-Lucreția Pîrv (born 29 June 1972) is a Romanian female volleyball player, who played as a wing spiker. She was part of the Romania women's national volleyball team at the 1994 FIVB Volleyball Women's World Championship in Brazil., 2002 FIVB Volleyball Women's World Championship in Germany, and 2001 Women's European Volleyball Championship.

== Playing career ==
Club	Country	From	To
Dinamo Bucharest	Romania	1986	1991
Volley San Lazzaro	Italy	1991	1994
Sabelli Conad Fano	Italy	1994	1995
Virtus Reggio Calabria	Italy	1995	1997
Minas Clube	Brazil	1997	1998
Virtus Reggio Calabria	Italy	1998	1999
Minas Clube	Brazil	1999	2002
AGIL Novara	Italy	2002	2004
RC Cannes	France	2004	2005
Asystel Volley	Italy	2005	2006

== Honours ==
=== Club ===
Dinamo Bucharest

- Romanian Championship: 1989

Minas Clube

- Brazilian Superliga: 2002

AGIL Novara

- CEV Cup: 2003

RC Cannes

- French Championship: 2005
- French Cup: 2005

Asystel Novara

- Italian Cup: 2004
- Italian Supercup: 2005
- Top Teams Cup / CEV Cup: 2006

== Personal life ==
Since 2003 she has been married to the Brazilian former international volleyball player, Giba. They have 2 children together, a daughter Nicoll (born 2004) and a son Patrick (born 2008). In November 2012, Cristina has filed for divorce.
