= Ferhat Akbaş =

Turkish volleyball coach and former player

Personal information
- Born: April 12, 1986 (age 40); Turkey
- Hometown: Istanbul Turkey
- Height: 1.96 m (6 ft 5 in)
- Education: Kocaeli University

Coaching information
- Current team: Eczacıbaşı Dynavit; Japan women's national volleyball team (coach)
Previous teams coached
Years	Teams
2004–2006; 2006–2011; 2011–2012; 2013–2014; 2014–2015; 2017–2018; 2017–2019; 2019–2021; 2021–2025; 2022–2023; 2025–	Galatasaray women's (statistician); Türk Telekom Ankara (assistant); Evergrande Hengda (assistant); Turkey (assistant); Turkey; Japan (assistant); CSM București; KPS Chemik Police; Eczacıbaşı Dynavit; Croatia; Japan
- Last updated: December 7, 2022

Ferhat Akbaş (born April 12, 1986) is a Turkish volleyball coach and former volleyball player. He is 1.96 m (6 ft 5 in) tall. He is the current coach of the Japan women's national volleyball team.

He is a graduate of business administration from Kocaeli University.

== Career ==
=== Player ===
At first Akbaş wanted to become a basketball player, however as he missed the date of the qualification, found himself in volleyball. He played volleyball in Marmara College and Arçelik volleyball clubs. Ferhat Akbaş was a member of the Turkey men's national volleyball team. His career as a player did not last long as he chose to pursue a coaching career.

=== Coach ===
He began his technical staff career as a statistics coach at Galatasaray women's volleyball team in 2004, and continued until 2006. The next season, he transferred to Türk Telekom Ankara to serve in the same position. His next post was the assistant coach of Lang Ping at Türk Telekom Ankara in the 2011–12 season. Then, he followed her to China, where he served from 2011 to 2012, and enjoyed champion title with Evergrande Hengda team. In the playing-free summer time, he went to Turkey to serve as statistics coach of Serbian-French Veljko Basic, who was the head coach of the Turkey men's volleyball team.

During his time in China, he received an offer from Vakıfbank women's team to serve as assistant coach of Giovanni Guidetti. In 2013, he became the assistant coach of Massimo Barbolini at Turkey women's national volleyball team.

At the age of only 28, he was appointed head coach of the Turkish women's national team, which won the gold medal at the 2014 Women's European Volleyball League. At the final match, he guided the Turkish team to victory against the German national team, which was coached by his former boss Giovanni Guidetti.

Ferhat Akbaş was the head coach of Grupa Azoty Chemik Police, a team in the Polish League, from 2019 to 2021 and led them to win the Polish League title in both the 2019/20 and 2020/21 seasons, as well as the Polish Cup in both of those years. On 29 April 2021, Eczacibasi Vitra announced the appointment of Ferhat Akbaş as the new Head Coach of Eczacıbaşı VitrA.

Akbaş was appointed head coach of the Croatia women's national volleyball team in January 2022. In August the same year, he managed the Croatia team finish the 2022 FIVB Women's Volleyball Challenger Cup as champion, and get promoted to the 2023 FIVB Women's Volleyball Nations League. After two years with the Croatia team, the and him separated in December 2023.

In February 2025, Akbaş signed a deal as head coach of the Japan women's national volleyball team, which will last until the end of the 2028 Los Angeles Olympics, making him the first foreign head coach in the team's history. He had served as assistant coach of the team in the years 2017 and 2018. He coached the Japan team first at the 2025 FIVB Women's Volleyball Nations League on 4 June.

== Honours ==
=== As assistant coach ===
==== Clubs ====
Evergrande Hengda

- Winner (1):
  - 2011–12 Chinese Volleyball League

Vakıfbank

- Winners (6):
  - 2012–13 Turkish Women's Volleyball League
  - 2013–14 Turkish Women's Volleyball League
  - 2012–13 Turkish Women's Volleyball Cup
  - 2013 FIVB Volleyball Women's Club World Championship
  - 2012–13 CEV Women's Champions League
  - 2013 Turkish Women's Volleyball Cup
- Runner-up (1):
  - 2013–14 CEV Women's Champions League -

=== As coach ===
==== National teams ====
Turkey

- Winners (3)
  - 2014 Women's European Volleyball League
  - 2015 Montreux Volley Masters
  - 2015 European Games
- Runners-up (1)
  - 2015 FIVB Volleyball Women's U23 World Championship

Croatia

- Winners (1)
  - 2022 FIVB Women's Volleyball Challenger Cup

==== Club teams ====
- Winners (2)
  - Romanian Championship 2017–18
  - Romanian Cup 2017–18
