= Maja Ognjenović =

Serbian volleyball player

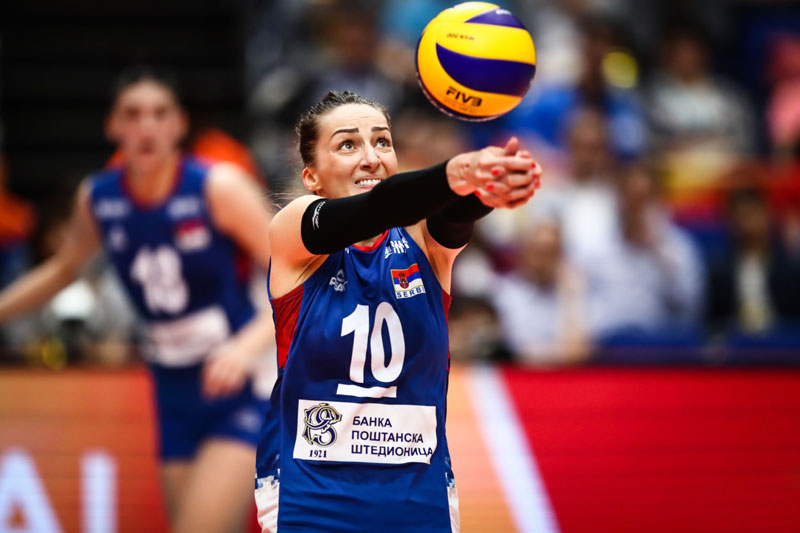
- Ognjenović in 2018

Personal information
- Full name: Maja Ognjenović
- Nationality: Serbian
- Born: 6 August 1984 (age 42); Zrenjanin, SR Serbia, Yugoslavia
- Hometown: Zrenjanin, Serbia
- Height: 1.83 m (6 ft 0 in)
- Weight: 67 kg (148 lb)
- Spike: 300 cm (118 in)
- Block: 293 cm (115 in)

Volleyball information
- Position: Setter
- Current club: (Italy) Savino del Bene Scandicci
- Number: 10

Career
Years	Teams
2002–2006	(Federal Republic of Yugoslavia) Crvena Zvezda
2006–2008	(Romania) Metal Galati
2008–2009	(Italy) Monte Schiavo Jesi
2009–2010	(Turkey) Eczacıbaşı Zentiva
2010–2011	(Greece) Olympiacos
2011–2012	(Italy) Liu Jo Volley Modena
2012–2013	(Poland) Impel Wrocław
2013–2015	(Poland) Chemik Police
2015–2016	(Italy) Nordmeccanica Piacenza
2016–2018	(Turkey) Eczacıbaşı VitrA
2018–2019	(Russia) WVC Dynamo Moscow
2019–2021	(Turkey) VakıfBank S.K.
2021–2023	(Turkey) Eczacıbaşı Dynavit
2023–	(Italy) Savino del Bene Scandicci

National team
2002–2006	Serbia and Montenegro
2007–	Serbia
Medal record
Women's volleyball
Representing Serbia
Olympic Games
Silver medal – second place	2016 Rio de Janeiro	Team
Bronze medal – third place	2020 Tokyo	Team
World Championship
Gold medal – first place	2018 Japan	Team
Bronze medal – third place	2006 Japan	Team
European Championship
Gold medal – first place	2011 Serbia/Italy	Team
Gold medal – first place	2019 Turkey/Poland/Hungary/Slovakia	Team
Silver medal – second place	2007 Belgium/Luxembourg	Team
Silver medal – second place	2021 Serbia/Croatia/Bulgaria/Romania	Team
Silver medal – second place	2023 Belgium/Italy/Estonia/Germany	Team
Bronze medal – third place	2015 Netherlands/Belgium	Team
Bronze medal – third place	2026 Sweden/Czechia/Slovakia/Turkey	Team
World Cup
Silver medal – second place	2015 Japan	Team
FIVB World Grand Prix
Bronze medal – third place	2011 Macau	Team
Bronze medal – third place	2013 Sapporo	Team
European League
Gold medal – first place	2009 Kayseri
Gold medal – first place	2010 Ankara
Gold medal – first place	2011 Istanbul
Bronze medal – third place	2012 Karlovy Vary
Trofeo Valle d'Aosta
Bronze medal – third place	2005 Courmayeur
Gloria Cup
Gold medal – first place	2019 Belek
Universiade
Silver medal – second place	2009 Belgrade	Team

Maja Ognjenović (Serbian Cyrillic: Маја Огњеновић; born 6 August 1984) is a Serbian professional volleyball player of the Serbia women's national volleyball team and a two-time Olympic medalist. She is a five-time Olympian at the setter position. Ognjenović won gold with the national team at the 2018 World Championship, and the 2011/2019 edition of the European Championship, silver at the 2016 Rio Olympic Games, and bronze at the 2020 Tokyo Summer Olympics.

Ognjenović has won a total of 17 podiums from major world-level or continental-level competitions (Olympic Games, World Championship and European Championship) with the women’s national team, six gold, five silver and six bronze medals. She also has a successful club career, having played in some of the world's most competitive leagues such as Italy, Turkey, Russia, Poland and more.

In 2020, Ognjenović was included in the list of #roster100 by FIVB as one of the 100 most influential volleyball players between 2010 and 2020.

“I’m happy to have had the opportunity to play in Serbian volleyball and in world volleyball during the last decade and I hope to have the opportunity to play a little more during the new decade. Because I have plans. I feel really good on the court and I have more to give to volleyball.”

On 1 September 2021, Ognjenović marked an important milestone of her career as she became the first Serbian woman to join the Serbian 300+ caps club after having played 300 matches with the national team. The Serbian setter and captain was honored by receiving a framed version of her jersey with the number 300.

“It is a big motivation for me to have played 300 matches with the national team for the past 16 or 17 years. Actually, I didn’t know that today is the day of my 300th match. It is a big privilege to be a member of the Serbian 300+ club and I think I am the first woman to have reached this mark. It was very emotional when I received the shirt with the number 300, but most of all I am happy about tonight’s victory.”

== National Team Career ==
=== Senior team ===
==== 2002: Joining the Serbian National Team ====
Ognjenović joined the Serbian women’s national team in 2002.

==== 2006: Won the bronze medal at the 2006 World Championship ====
She started all matches of the 2006 FIVB World Championship held in Japan; the Serbian national team went on to win the bronze medal.

==== 2007: Won the silver medal at the 2007 European Championship ====
In 2007, Ognjenović won the silver medal and the Best Setter award at the 2007 European Championship.

==== 2009–2011: Three-time back-to-back European League champions ====
Ognjenović was part of the Serbian squad that won the gold medal during the 2009 European League. She took part in the 2009 Summer Universiade with the national team the following month and won the silver medal.

She went on to win back-to-back gold medal at the 2010 European League with the national team. She was also named the Best Setter of the tournament.

Ognjenović was named in the roster for the 2011 European League. Serbia won the gold medal for the third year in a row. She was awarded tournament’s Best Setter for the 2nd year running.

==== 2011: Won the gold medal at the 2011 European Championship ====
At the final match against Germany, Serbia was able to get the title of the 2011 European Championship in front of its home crowd, ending the match and the tournament with a 3–2 score. Ognjenović was awarded Best Setter of the tournament.

==== 2012: Won the bronze medal at the 2012 European League ====
Ognjenović won the bronze medal with the Serbian squad at the 2012 European League. She was named Best Setter for the third year in a row.

==== 2015: Won the bronze medal at the 2015 European Championship ====
In 2015, Ognjenović won the bronze medal with the Serbian national team after defeating Turkey 3–0 in the 3rd place match of the 2015 European Championship. She was awarded tournament’s Best Setter.

==== 2016: Won the silver medal at the 2016 Rio Olympics ====
Ognjenović was part of the 12-player Olympic roster for the 2016 Summer Olympics in Rio de Janeiro. On 20 August 2016, she won a silver medal as a member of the Serbian women’s volleyball team after being defeated by China 3–1 in the final.

==== 2018: Won the gold medal at the 2018 World Championship ====
Even though Ognjenović decided to take a break from the Serbian national team after the 2016 Rio Olympics, Serbia national team head coach Zoran Terzić announced her comeback by including her in Serbia’s 14-player roster for the 2018 World Championship. She then proceeded to win Serbia’s first World Championship gold medal, when her team defeated Italy 3–2 in the final match.

==== 2019: Won the gold medal at the 2019 European Championship ====
Ognjenović won the gold medal with her national team at the 2019 European Championship after they defeated Turkey 3–2 in the finals. She was awarded tournament’s Best Setter.

==== 2021: Won the bronze medal at the 2020 Tokyo Olympics and silver medal at the European Championship ====
Ognjenović was named to the 12-player roster for the 2020 Summer Olympics in Tokyo, her fourth straight Olympic Games. After a devastating 3–0 defeat to USA during the semifinals, Serbia proceeded to defeat South Korea 3–0 in the 3rd place match for the bronze medal.

She led Serbia to victory as they defeated France 3–1 to proceed to the European Championship semifinals. She went on to win the silver medal at the 2021 European Championship after being defeated by Italy 3–1 in the final.

==== June 2023: First ever participation in the Volleyball Nations League ====
Ognjenović participated in the VNL for the 1st time in her career since the creation of the tournament. As it was widely regarded as a non-major tournament for the longest time (before the introduction of ranking points), she uses this time to recuperate after a hectic and stressful club season.

This time round, along with fellow compatriot, Tijana Bošković; both joined team Serbia in Week 3 of the 2023 FIVB Volleyball Women's Nations League in Suwon, South Korea at the request of Giovanni Guidetti, Serbia’s new coach. Due to a rough start during the first 2 weeks of the competition, Serbia did not qualify for the Final 8 as they only won 3 out of 4 matches in Week 3, ranking just outside of the top 8 at the end of the preliminary round.

==== September 2023: Won the silver medal at the 2023 European Championship ====
Ognjenović, despite being diagnosed with a severe stomach virus, came off the bench in the 3rd set against the Netherlands in the semi-finals after her team lost the 2nd set and was trailing by 3-points in the 3rd and led them to a decisive 3–1 victory with her experience and tenacity. She went on to win the silver medal at the 2023 European Championship final after a well fought match which ended with a score of 3–2 in favor of Türkiye.

== Club career ==
=== 2000s ===
Ognjenović made her professional career debut with Crvena Zvezda in 2002. She won the Serbian league championship and the Serbian cup in the same season. She stayed for the following season and went on to win the Serbian league championship yet again. During the 2004 season, she came 2nd place in both the league and cup championship. In the 2005 season, she got bronze for both championship.

Ognjenović then played for Metal Galati from 2006 to 2008, winning the Romanian league championship for both seasons.

She won the 2008–09 CEV Challenge Cup with Italian club Monte Schiavo Banca Marche Jesi, defeating the Greek club Panathinaikos Athens 3–0 in the final. She was awarded tournament’s Best Setter.

In 2009, she played for Eczacıbaşı Zentiva.

=== 2010s ===
In the 2010–11 season, she won the Greek Cup with Olympiacos.

In 2011, she played for Liu Jo Volley Modena.

She went on to play for Impel Wrocław in the 2012–2013 season.

In 2013–14, she won both the Polish league and Polish Cup with Chemik Police. She was also awarded Best Setter of the Polish Cup.

Ognjenović stayed in Poland with Chemik Police the following season, and went on to win the 2014–15 Polish league with them. Although the team finished 4th place, she was named Best Setter of the 2014–15 CEV Champions League.

In 2015, she played for Nordmeccanica Piacenza. She was runner up of the 2015–16 Italian Serie A1 league after being defeated by Imoco Volley Conegliano 3–0 in the decisive 4th final match of the season.

In 2016, she won the 2016 FIVB Club World Championship with Eczacıbaşı VitrA in Manila. She proceeded to win the bronze medal with the club team during the 2016–17 CEV Champions League after defeating Russian club Dinamo Moscow 3–1 in the 3rd place match.

In 2017–18, she stayed on with Turkish club Eczacıbaşı VitrA and won the 2017–18 CEV Cup. She was also named the Best Setter of the tournament. Although her team lost the Turkish Cup to Turkish rivals VakıfBank, Ognjenović was awarded Best Setter.

During the 2018–19 season, she won both the Russian Cup and Russian Super Cup with Dinamo Moscow. She was named the Russian Cup’s Best Setter.

In 2019, she won the bronze medal at the 2019 FIVB Club World Championship with Turkish club VakıfBank by defeating Italian club Igor Gorgonzola Novara 3–0 in the 3rd place match. She was the runner up of the Turkish Super Cup after Turkish rivals Eczacıbaşı VitrA defeated them 3–2. She was named Best Setter of the Super Cup.

=== 2020s ===
Ognjenović stayed with Turkish club VakıfBank the following season (2020–2021) and proceeded to win the 2021 Turkish Cup with them. She won the silver medal with VakıfBank after being defeated by Imoco Volley Conegliano 3–2 in the final match.

In 2021–22, Ognjenović won the 2021–22 CEV Cup with Eczacıbaşı Dynavit, defeating German club Allianz MTV Stuttgart 3–1 in both the first and second leg of the finals. She was awarded her first ever MVP. She was also named Best Setter of the CEV Cup.

She stayed on with Turkish club Eczacıbaşı Dynavit the following season and won the bronze medal at the 2022 FIVB Club World Championship by defeating Brazilian club Gerdau Minas 3–1 in the 3rd place match.

Currently, she plays at Savino del Bene Scandicci.

== Personal life ==
Ognjenović has been married to Serbian former competitive water polo player Danilo Ikodinović since 2016. They have been in a relationship for more than 3 years before deciding to tie the knot on the last day of 2016.

== Awards ==
=== National team ===
==== Senior team ====
- 2005 Trofeo Valle d'Aosta – Bronze Medal
- 2006 World Championship – Bronze Medal
- 2007 European Championship – Silver Medal
- 2009 European League – Gold Medal
- 2010 European League – Gold Medal
- 2011 European League – Gold Medal
- 2011 European Championship – Gold Medal
- 2012 European League – Bronze Medal
- 2015 European Championship – Bronze Medal
- 2016 Summer Olympics – Silver Medal
- 2018 World Championship – Gold Medal
- 2019 Gloria Cup – Gold Medal
- 2019 European Championship – Gold Medal
- 2020 Summer Olympics – Bronze Medal
- 2021 European Championship – Silver Medal
- 2023 European Championship – Silver Medal

==== Universiade ====
- 2009 Summer Universiade – Silver Medal

=== Clubs ===
- 2002/2003 Serbian Championship – Champion, with Crvena Zvezda
- 2002/2003 Serbian Cup – Champion, with Crvena Zvezda
- 2003/2004 Serbian Championship – Champion, with Crvena Zvezda
- 2003/2004 Serbian Cup – Bronze medal, with Crvena Zvezda
- 2004/2005 Serbian Championship – Runner-Up, with Crvena Zvezda
- 2004/2005 Serbian Cup – Runner-Up, with Crvena Zvezda
- 2005/2006 Serbian Championship – Bronze medal, with Crvena Zvezda
- 2005/2006 Serbian Cup – Bronze medal, with Crvena Zvezda
- 2006/2007 Romanian Championship – Champion, with Metal Galati
- 2006/2007 Romanian Cup – Champion, with Metal Galati
- 2007/2008 Romanian Championship – Champion, with Metal Galati
- 2007/2008 Romanian Cup – Champion, with Metal Galati
- 2008/2009 CEV Challenge Cup – Champion, with Monte Schiavo Banca Marche Jesi
- 2010/2011 Greek Cup – Champion, with Olympiacos
- 2012/2013 Polish Cup – Bronze medal, with Impel Wrocław
- 2013/2014 Polish volleyball league – Champion, with Chemik Police
- 2013/2014 Polish Cup – Champion, with Chemik Police
- 2014/2015 Polish Cup – Runner-Up, with Chemik Police
- 2014/2015 Polish volleyball league – Champion, with Chemik Police
- 2015–16 Italian Serie A1 Championship – Runner-Up, with Nordmeccanica Piacenza
- 2016 FIVB Club World Championship – Champion, with Eczacıbaşı VitrA
- 2016–17 CEV Champions League – Bronze medal, with Eczacıbaşı VitrA
- 2017–18 CEV Cup – Champion, with Eczacıbaşı VitrA
- 2017–18 Turkish League – Runner-Up, with Eczacıbaşı VitrA
- 2018/19 Russian Cup – Champion, with Dinamo Moscow
- 2018/19 Russian Super Cup – Champion, with Dinamo Moscow
- 2018–19 Russian Super League – Champion, with Dinamo Moscow
- 2019 FIVB Club World Championship – Bronze medal, with VakıfBank S.K.
- 2020–21 Turkish Super Cup – Runner-Up, with VakıfBank S.K.
- 2020–21 Turkish Cup – Champion, with VakıfBank S.K.
- 2020–21 CEV Champions League – Runner-Up, with Vakıfbank S.K.
- 2021–22 Turkish Super Cup – Runner-Up, with Eczacıbaşı Dynavit
- 2021–22 CEV Cup – Champion, with Eczacıbaşı Dynavit
- 2022 FIVB Club World Championship – Bronze medal, with Eczacıbaşı Dynavit
- 2022–23 Turkish League – Runner-Up, with Eczacıbaşı Dynavit
- 2022–23 CEV Champions League – Runner-Up, with Eczacıbaşı Dynavit
- 2023–24 Italian Serie A1 Championship – Runner-Up, with Savino del Bene Scandicci
- 2025 FIVB Club World Championship – Champion, with Savino del Bene Scandicci

=== Individual ===
- 2007 European Championship "Best Setter"
- 2008–09 CEV Challenge Cup Final Four "Best Setter"
- 2010 European League "Best Setter"
- 2011 European League "Best Setter"
- 2011 European Championship "Best Setter"
- 2012 European League "Best Setter"
- 2013/14 Polish Cup "Best Setter"
- 2014–15 CEV Champions League "Best Setter"
- 2015 European Championship "Best Setter"
- 2017–18 CEV Cup "Best Setter"
- 2017–18 Turkish Cup "Best Setter"
- 2018/19 Russian Cup "Best Setter"
- World Olympic Qualifications 2020 "Best Setter"
- 2019 European Championship "Best Setter"
- 2020–21 Turkish Women's Volleyball League "Best Setter"
- 2021/22 CEV Cup "Best Setter"
- 2021/22 CEV Cup "MVP"
- 2025 FIVB Club World Championship "Best Setter"

== See also ==
- Summer Olympics national flag bearers

Olympic Games
Preceded by Filip Filipović (with Sonja Vasić)	Flagbearer for Serbia (with Dušan Mandić); Paris 2024	Succeeded by Incumbent
