= Roxana Iosef =

Romanian volleyball player (born 1988)

Personal information
- Full name: Bacșiș (Iosef) Roxana Denisa
- Nationality: Romanian
- Born: 19 August 1988 (age 38)
- Height: 1.90 m (75 in)
- Weight: 72 kg (159 lb)
- Spike: 305 cm (120 in)
- Block: 295 cm (116 in)

Volleyball information
- Position: Opposite
- Number: 3 (national team)

Career
Years	Teams
2015	CSM București

National team
2015	Romania

Bacșiș (Iosef) Roxana Denisa (born 19 August 1988) is a Romanian female volleyball player, playing as an opposite. She is part of the Romania women's national volleyball team.

She competed at the 2015 European Games in Baku and at the 2015 Women's European Volleyball Championship. On club level she plays for CSM Bucarest in 2015.
