= UVT Agroland Timișoara =

Romanian volleyball club

- Full name: UVT Agroland Timișoara
- Short name: UVT; Agroland
- Founded: 2014; 11 years ago
- Ground: Constantin Jude Hall (Capacity: 2,200)
- Chairman: Horia Cardoș
- Manager: Bogdan Paul
- League: Divizia A2
- 2018–19: Divizia A1, 9th (relegated)
- Website: Club home page

UVT Agroland Timișoara, is a professional women's volleyball club based in Timișoara, Romania, that competed in the CEV Challenge Cup.

== Team ==
=== Current squad ===
Squad for the 2018–19 season

- (Romania) Diana Cărbuneanu
- (Romania) Roxana Iancu
- (Romania) Andreea Petra
- (Romania) Marisa Radu
- (Romania) Daniela Lupescu
- (Romania) Larisa Vasilică
- (Romania) Sorina Miclăuș
- (Romania) Anca Mănuc
- (Romania) Cybill Catargiu
- (France) Maëva Orlé
- (Serbia) Teodora Pušić
- (Serbia) Katarina Jovanović
- (Slovakia) Barbora Koseková
