= Sobo language =

Sobo language may refer to:

- Isoko language, an Edoid language spoken by the Isoko people in southern Nigeria
- Urhobo language, an Edoid language spoken by the Urhobo people of southern Nigeria
