= 2018–19 CEV Women's Challenge Cup =

- League: CEV Women's Challenge Cup
- Sport: Volleyball
- Duration: 6 November 2018 – 27 March 2019
- Number of teams: 44
- Finals champions: (Italy) Saugella Team Monza
- Runners-up: (Turkey) Aydın Büyükşehir Belediyespor
- Finals MVP: (Netherlands) Anne Buijs (Saugella Team Monza)

CEV Women's Challenge Cup seasons
- ← 2017–18 2019–20 →

The 2018–19 CEV Women's Challenge Cup was the 39th edition of the European Challenge Cup volleyball club tournament, the former "CEV Cup".

== Format ==
The tournament is played on a knockout format, with 32 teams participating. Initially 24 teams play a qualification round with the 12 winners advancing to the main phase. On 29 June 2018, a drawing of lots in Luxembourg City, Luxembourg, determined the team's pairing for each match. Each team plays a home and an away match with result points awarded for each leg (3 points for 3–0 or 3–1 wins, 2 points for 3–2 win, 1 point for 2–3 loss). After two legs, the team with the most result points advances to the next round. In case the teams are tied after two legs, a Golden Set is played immediately at the completion of the second leg. The Golden Set winner is the team that first obtains 15 points, provided that the points difference between the two teams is at least 2 points (thus, the Golden Set is similar to a tiebreak set in a normal match).

== Participating teams ==
- Drawing of lots for the 32 participating team was held in Luxembourg City, Luxembourg on 29 June 2018.

The number of participants on the basis of ranking list for European Cup Competitions:

Rank	Country	Number of teams	Teams
1	Turkey	2	Beşiktaş JK, Aydın Büyükşehir Belediyespor
2	Italy	1	Saugella Team Monza
3	Russia	1	Proton Saratov
5	Azerbaijan	1	Azerrail Baku
6	France	1	Le Cannet-Rocheville
7	Switzerland	2	Kanti Schaffhausen, Viteos Neuchâtel Université
8	Romania	1	UVT Agroland Timișoara
9	Germany	1	Ladies in Black Aachen
11	Czech Republic	2	Dukla Liberec, Královo Pole Brno
12	Slovenia	3	Calcit Kamnik, Gen-I Volley Nova Gorica, Formula Formis Rogoza
14	Bulgaria	1	Beroe Stara Zagora
15	Finland	3	LP Kangasala, LiigaPloki Pihtipudas, Pölkky Kuusamo
16	Hungary	3	UTE Volleyball Team Budapest, Jászberény Volleyball Team, Vasas Óbuda Budapest
17	Bosnia and Herzegovina	1	ŽOK Gacko
17	Israel	1	Hapoel Kfar Saba
20	Belgium	3	VDK Bank Gent, Interfreight Antwerp Ladies, Hermes Oostende
20	Ukraine	1	Orbita Zaporizhia
23	Kosovo	1	KV Kastrioti Ferizaji
25	Austria	2	SG Prinz Brunnenbau Volleys, PSvBG Salzburg
25	Croatia	1	Mladost Zagreb
25	Cyprus	1	AEL Limassol
25	Denmark	1	Holte IF
25	Spain	2	Dimurol Libby's La Laguna, CCO 7 Palmas Gran Canaria
25	Greece	3	Aris Thessaloniki, Olympiacos Piraeus, A.O. Thiras
25	Luxembourg	1	Chev Diekirch
25	Portugal	2	AVC Famalicão, CK Ponta Delgada
25	Slovakia	2	Slávia EU Bratislava, Strabag Bratislava

== Qualification phase ==
=== 2nd round ===
Team 1	Agg.	Team 2	1st leg	2nd leg	Golden Set
AVC Famalicão (Portugal)	6–0	(Spain) Dimurol Libby's La Laguna	3–0	3–0	
CK Ponta Delgada (Portugal)	0–6	(Belgium) Hermes Oostende	0–3	0–3	
CCO 7 Palmas Gran Canaria (Spain)	0–6	(Switzerland) Viteos Neuchâtel Université	0–3	0–3	
Olympiacos Piraeus (Greece)	6–0	(Luxembourg) Chev Diekirch	3–0	3–0	
KV Kastrioti Ferizaji (Kosovo)	0–6	(Turkey) Beşiktaş JK	0–3	0–3	
A.O. Thiras (Greece)	6–0	(Cyprus) AEL Limassol	3–0	3–0	
Strabag Bratislava (Slovakia)	0–6	(Slovenia) GEN-I Volley Nova Gorica	0–3	0–3	
Slávia EU Bratislava (Slovakia)	4–2	(Hungary) Jászberény Volleyball Team	3–2	3–2	
Formula Formis Rogoza (Slovenia)	3–3	(Hungary) Vasas Óbuda Budapest	3–1	1–3	7–15
PSvBG Salzburg (Austria)	2–4	(Czech Republic) Dukla Liberec	3–2	0–3	
Holte IF (Denmark)	0–6	(Finland) LiigaPloki Pihtipudas	1–3	0–3	
Interfreight Antwerp Ladies (Belgium)	2–4	(Finland) Pölkky Kuusamo	3–2	1–3	

==== First leg ====
Date	Time		Score		Set 1	Set 2	Set 3	Set 4	Set 5	Total	Report
8 Nov	21:00	AVC Famalicão (Portugal)	3–0	(Spain) Dimurol Libby's La Laguna	25–21	25–21	25–15			75–57	Report
7 Nov	20:30	CK Ponta Delgada (Portugal)	0–3	(Belgium) Hermes Oostende	22–25	18–25	15–25			55–75	Report
7 Nov	18:00	CCO 7 Palmas Gran Canaria (Spain)	0–3	(Switzerland) Viteos Neuchâtel Université	24–26	23–25	19–25			66–76	Report
7 Nov	18:00	Olympiacos Piraeus (Greece)	3–0	(Luxembourg) Chev Diekirch	25–4	25–2	25–12			75–18	Report
13 Nov	13:00	KV Kastrioti Ferizaji (Kosovo)	0–3	(Turkey) Beşiktaş JK	7–25	10–25	18–25			35–75	Report
7 Nov	19:00	A.O. Thiras (Greece)	3–0	(Cyprus) AEL Limassol	26–24	25–20	25–16			76–60	Report
8 Nov	19:15	Strabag Bratislava (Slovakia)	0–3	(Slovenia) GEN-I Volley Nova Gorica	25–27	20–25	17–25			62–77	Report
7 Nov	16:30	Slávia EU Bratislava (Slovakia)	3–2	(Hungary) Jászberény Volleyball Team	27–29	25–18	25–21	25–27	15–6	117–101	Report
7 Nov	18:00	Formula Formis Rogoza (Slovenia)	3–1	(Hungary) Vasas Óbuda Budapest	25–16	19–25	25–17	25–17		94–75	Report
7 Nov	19:30	PSvBG Salzburg (Austria)	3–2	(Czech Republic) Dukla Liberec	17–25	25–22	23–25	25–23	15–10	105–105	Report
6 Nov	18:30	Holte IF (Denmark)	1–3	(Finland) LiigaPloki Pihtipudas	25–27	25–21	21–25	18–25		89–98	Report
7 Nov	20:30	Interfreight Antwerp Ladies (Belgium)	3–2	(Finland) Pölkky Kuusamo	25–21	25–19	17–25	24–26	15–11	106–102	Report

==== Second leg ====
Date	Time		Score		Set 1	Set 2	Set 3	Set 4	Set 5	Total	Report
14 Nov	20:00	Dimurol Libby's La Laguna (Spain)	0–3	(Portugal) AVC Famalicão	17–25	20–25	13–25			50–75	Report
14 Nov	20:30	Hermes Oostende (Belgium)	3–0	(Portugal) CK Ponta Delgada	25–23	25–18	25–21			75–62	Report
14 Nov	20:00	Viteos Neuchâtel Université (Switzerland)	3–0	(Spain) CCO 7 Palmas Gran Canaria	26–24	25–19	25–23			76–66	Report
15 Nov	19:30	Chev Diekirch (Luxembourg)	0–3	(Greece) Olympiacos Piraeus	12–25	14–25	17–25			43–75	Report
15 Nov	19:00	Beşiktaş JK (Turkey)	3–0	(Kosovo) KV Kastrioti Ferizaji	25–11	25–9	25–14			75–34	Report
14 Nov	20:00	AEL Limassol (Cyprus)	0–3	(Greece) A.O. Thiras	12–25	20–25	15–25			47–75	Report
14 Nov	18:00	GEN-I Volley Nova Gorica (Slovenia)	3–0	(Slovakia) Strabag Bratislava	25–19	25–13	25–12			75–44	Report
14 Nov	19:00	Jászberény Volleyball Team (Hungary)	2–3	(Slovakia) Slávia EU Bratislava	25–21	14–25	25–22	20–25	8–15	92–108	Report
14 Nov	17:00	Vasas Óbuda Budapest (Hungary)	3–1	(Slovenia) Formula Formis Rogoza	25–18	18–25	25–13	25–17		93–73	Report
Golden set		Vasas Óbuda Budapest (Hungary)	15–7	(Slovenia) Formula Formis Rogoza							
13 Nov	18:00	Dukla Liberec (Czech Republic)	3–0	(Austria) PSvBG Salzburg	25–23	25–16	25–21			75–60	Report
15 Nov	18:30	LiigaPloki Pihtipudas (Finland)	3–0	(Denmark) Holte IF	25–13	25–16	25–22			75–51	Report
14 Nov	18:30	Pölkky Kuusamo (Finland)	3–1	(Belgium) Interfreight Antwerp Ladies	25–12	10–25	25–21	25–21		85–79	Report

== Main phase ==
=== 16th finals ===
Team 1	Agg.	Team 2	1st leg	2nd leg	Golden Set
Beşiktaş JK (Turkey)	3–3	(Turkey) Aydın Büyükşehir Belediyespor	3–1	0–3	12–15
Hermes Oostende (Belgium)	6–0	(Azerbaijan) Azerrail Baku	3–0	3–0	
A.O. Thiras (Greece)	6–0	(Czech Republic) Královo Pole Brno	3–0	3–0	
Pölkky Kuusamo (Finland)	3–3	(Hungary) UTE Volleyball Team Budapest	3–1	1–3	15–13
Gen-I Volley Nova Gorica (Slovenia)	6–0	(Finland) LP Kangasala	3–0	3–0	
Vasas Óbuda Budapest (Hungary)	6–0	(Romania) UVT Agroland Timișoara	3–1	3–0	
Viteos Neuchâtel Université (Switzerland)	5–1	(Ukraine) Orbita Zaporizhia	3–0	3–2	
Mladost Zagreb (Croatia)	0–6	(Switzerland) Kanti Schaffhausen	0–3	1–3	
SG Prinz Brunnenbau Volleys (Austria)	0–6	(Italy) Saugella Team Monza	0–3	0–3	
LiigaPloki Pihtipudas (Finland)	1–5	(Belgium) VDK Bank Gent	2–3	0–3	
Slávia EU Bratislava (Slovakia)	2–4	(Slovenia) Calcit Kamnik	0–3	3–2	
AVC Famalicão (Portugal)	1–5	(Germany) Ladies in Black Aachen	0–3	2–3	
Beroe Stara Zagora (Bulgaria)	4–2	(Greece) Aris Thessaloniki	3–0	2–3	
Le Cannet-Rocheville (France)	3–3	(Greece) Olympiacos Piraeus	3–0	1–3	15–10
ŽOK Gacko (Bosnia and Herzegovina)	0–6	(Israel) Hapoel Kfar Saba	0–3	0–3	
Dukla Liberec (Czech Republic)	4–2	(Russia) Proton Saratov	3–1	2–3	

==== First leg ====
Date	Time		Score		Set 1	Set 2	Set 3	Set 4	Set 5	Total	Report
28 Nov	14:00	Beşiktaş JK (Turkey)	3–1	(Turkey) Aydın Büyükşehir Belediyespor	25–22	25–19	19–25	25–13		94–79	Report
28 Nov	20:30	Hermes Oostende (Belgium)	3–0	(Azerbaijan) Azerrail Baku	25–20	25–22	25–14			75–56	Report
29 Nov	19:00	A.O. Thiras (Greece)	3–0	(Czech Republic) Královo Pole Brno	25–21	25–16	25–18			75–55	Report
28 Nov	18:30	Pölkky Kuusamo (Finland)	3–1	(Hungary) UTE Volleyball Team Budapest	22–25	26–24	25–17	25–21		98–87	Report
28 Nov	18:00	Gen-I Volley Nova Gorica (Slovenia)	3–0	(Finland) LP Kangasala	25–18	25–22	25–13			75–53	Report
28 Nov	17:30	Vasas Óbuda Budapest (Hungary)	3–1	(Romania) UVT Agroland Timișoara	25–14	25–15	22–25	25–18		97–72	Report
29 Nov	20:00	Viteos Neuchâtel Université (Switzerland)	3–0	(Ukraine) Orbita Zaporizhia	25–20	25–17	25–19			75–56	Report
28 Nov	19:00	Mladost Zagreb (Croatia)	0–3	(Switzerland) Kanti Schaffhausen	16–25	20–25	21–25			57–75	Report
28 Nov	19:30	SG Prinz Brunnenbau Volleys (Austria)	0–3	(Italy) Saugella Team Monza	19–25	23–25	20–25			62–75	Report
28 Nov	18:30	LiigaPloki Pihtipudas (Finland)	2–3	(Belgium) VDK Bank Gent	19–25	25–20	24–26	25–20	12–15	105–106	Report
28 Nov	16:30	Slávia EU Bratislava (Slovakia)	0–3	(Slovenia) Calcit Kamnik	16–25	18–25	16–25			50–75	Report
29 Nov	20:30	AVC Famalicão (Portugal)	0–3	(Germany) Ladies in Black Aachen	17–25	16–25	16–25			49–75	Report
29 Nov	18:00	Beroe Stara Zagora (Bulgaria)	3–0	(Greece) Aris Thessaloniki	26–24	25–23	25–19			76–66	Report
20 Nov	20:00	Le Cannet-Rocheville (France)	3–0	(Greece) Olympiacos Piraeus	27–25	25–17	25–14			77–56	Report
28 Nov	19:00	ŽOK Gacko (Bosnia and Herzegovina)	0–3	(Israel) Hapoel Kfar Saba	19–25	18–25	23–25			60–75	Report
27 Nov	18:00	Dukla Liberec (Czech Republic)	3–1	(Russia) Proton Saratov	25–19	25–16	17–25	30–28		97–88	Report

==== Second leg ====
Date	Time		Score		Set 1	Set 2	Set 3	Set 4	Set 5	Total	Report
5 Dec	18:00	Aydın Büyükşehir Belediyespor (Turkey)	3–0	(Turkey) Beşiktaş JK	25–20	25–20	25–20			75–60	Report
Golden set		Aydın Büyükşehir Belediyespor (Turkey)	15–12	(Turkey) Beşiktaş JK							
29 Nov	20:30	Azerrail Baku (Azerbaijan)	0–3	(Belgium) Hermes Oostende	11–25	16–25	18–25			45–75	Report
4 Dec	18:00	Královo Pole Brno (Czech Republic)	0–3	(Greece) A.O. Thiras	18–25	19–25	19–25			56–75	Report
5 Dec	18:00	UTE Volleyball Team Budapest (Hungary)	3–1	(Finland) Pölkky Kuusamo	25–23	25–20	14–25	25–18		89–86	Report
Golden set		UTE Volleyball Team Budapest (Hungary)	13–15	(Finland) Pölkky Kuusamo							
5 Dec	18:30	LP Kangasala (Finland)	0–3	(Slovenia) Gen-I Volley Nova Gorica	17–25	19–25	16–25			52–75	Report
6 Dec	19:00	UVT Agroland Timișoara (Romania)	0–3	(Hungary) Vasas Óbuda Budapest	17–25	13–25	25–27			55–77	Report
6 Dec	18:00	Orbita Zaporizhia (Ukraine)	2–3	(Switzerland) Viteos Neuchâtel Université	26–24	21–25	25–22	11–25	11–15	94–111	Report
5 Dec	20:00	Kanti Schaffhausen (Switzerland)	3–1	(Croatia) Mladost Zagreb	15–19	23–25	25–19	25–21		88–84	Report
4 Dec	20:00	Saugella Team Monza (Italy)	3–0	(Austria) SG Prinz Brunnenbau Volleys	25–17	25–14	25–18			75–49	Report
5 Dec	20:30	VDK Bank Gent (Belgium)	3–0	(Finland) LiigaPloki Pihtipudas	25–23	25–20	25–23			75–66	Report
5 Dec	20:00	Calcit Kamnik (Slovenia)	2–3	(Slovakia) Slávia EU Bratislava	25–15	18–25	25–18	22–25	10–15	100–98	Report
5 Dec	19:30	Ladies in Black Aachen (Germany)	3–2	(Portugal) AVC Famalicão	25–16	23–25	25–20	18–25	18–16	109–102	Report
4 Dec	20:30	Aris Thessaloniki (Greece)	3–2	(Bulgaria) Beroe Stara Zagora	22–25	16–25	25–16	25–20	15–13	103–99	Report
27 Nov	18:00	Olympiacos Piraeus (Greece)	3–1	(France) Le Cannet-Rocheville	25–20	16–25	25–23	25–21		91–89	Report
Golden set		Olympiacos Piraeus (Greece)	10–15	(France) Le Cannet-Rocheville							
5 Dec	17:00	Hapoel Kfar Saba (Israel)	3–0	(Bosnia and Herzegovina) ŽOK Gacko	25–18	25–13	25–22			75–53	Report
5 Dec	19:00	Proton Saratov (Russia)	3–2	(Czech Republic) Dukla Liberec	18–25	20–25	25–18	25–19	15–10	103–97	Report

=== 8th finals ===
Team 1	Agg.	Team 2	1st leg	2nd leg	Golden Set
Aydın Büyükşehir Belediyespor (Turkey)	5–1	(Belgium) Hermes Oostende	3–0	3–2	
Pölkky Kuusamo (Finland)	0–6	(Greece) A.O. Thiras	1–3	1–3	
Vasas Óbuda Budapest (Hungary)	2–4	(Slovenia) Gen-I Volley Nova Gorica	3–2	1–3	
Viteos Neuchâtel Université (Switzerland)	2–4	(Switzerland) Kanti Schaffhausen	3–2	1–3	
VDK Bank Gent (Belgium)	1–5	(Italy) Saugella Team Monza	0–3	2–3	
Calcit Kamnik (Slovenia)	4–2	(Germany) Ladies in Black Aachen	3–1	2–3	
Beroe Stara Zagora (Bulgaria)	0–6	(France) Le Cannet-Rocheville	0–3	1–3	
Dukla Liberec (Czech Republic)	3–3	(Israel) Hapoel Kfar Saba	3–0	1–3	12–15

==== First leg ====
Date	Time		Score		Set 1	Set 2	Set 3	Set 4	Set 5	Total	Report
19 Dec	19:00	Aydın Büyükşehir Belediyespor (Turkey)	3–0	(Belgium) Hermes Oostende	25–18	25–15	27–25			77–58	Report
19 Dec	18:30	Pölkky Kuusamo (Finland)	1–3	(Greece) A.O. Thiras	23–25	25–14	21–25	22–25		91–89	Report
19 Dec	19:00	Vasas Óbuda Budapest (Hungary)	3–2	(Slovenia) Gen-I Volley Nova Gorica	19–25	25–21	25–21	19–25	16–14	104–106	Report
20 Dec	20:00	Viteos Neuchâtel Université (Switzerland)	3–2	(Switzerland) Kanti Schaffhausen	22–25	18–25	25–23	25–23	15–13	105–109	Report
19 Dec	20:30	VDK Bank Gent (Belgium)	0–3	(Italy) Saugella Team Monza	15–25	20–25	23–25			58–75	Report
18 Dec	20:00	Calcit Kamnik (Slovenia)	3–1	(Germany) Ladies in Black Aachen	25–19	25–16	19–25	25–14		94–74	Report
20 Dec	18:00	Beroe Stara Zagora (Bulgaria)	0–3	(France) Le Cannet-Rocheville	10–25	11–25	16–25			37–75	Report
18 Dec	20:00	Dukla Liberec (Czech Republic)	3–0	(Israel) Hapoel Kfar Saba	32–30	25–15	25–13			82–58	Report

==== Second leg ====
Date	Time		Score		Set 1	Set 2	Set 3	Set 4	Set 5	Total	Report
23 Jan	20:30	Hermes Oostende (Belgium)	2–3	(Turkey) Aydın Büyükşehir Belediyespor	25–22	19–25	18–25	25–21	12–15	99–108	Report
22 Jan	19:30	A.O. Thiras (Greece)	3–1	(Finland) Pölkky Kuusamo	20–25	25–17	25–20	25–15		95–77	Report
23 Jan	18:00	Gen-I Volley Nova Gorica (Slovenia)	3–1	(Hungary) Vasas Óbuda Budapest	25–14	25–20	20–25	25–15		95–74	Report
23 Jan	20:00	Kanti Schaffhausen (Switzerland)	3–1	(Switzerland) Viteos Neuchâtel Université	25–17	20–25	25–20	25–22		95–84	Report
23 Jan	19:00	Saugella Team Monza (Italy)	3–2	(Belgium) VDK Bank Gent	25–19	25–13	24–26	19–25	15–7	108–90	Report
23 Jan	19:30	Ladies in Black Aachen (Germany)	3–2	(Slovenia) Calcit Kamnik	25–22	27–25	20–25	24–26	15–6	111–104	Report
22 Jan	20:00	Le Cannet-Rocheville (France)	3–1	(Bulgaria) Beroe Stara Zagora	25–15	25–13	23–25	25–13		98–66	Report
23 Jan	18:00	Hapoel Kfar Saba (Israel)	3–1	(Czech Republic) Dukla Liberec	18–25	25–13	25–22	26–24		94–84	Report
Golden set		Hapoel Kfar Saba (Israel)	15–12	(Czech Republic) Dukla Liberec							

=== 4th finals ===
Team 1	Agg.	Team 2	1st leg	2nd leg
A.O. Thiras (Greece)	1–5	(Turkey) Aydın Büyükşehir Belediyespor	2–3	0–3
Kanti Schaffhausen (Switzerland)	0–6	(Slovenia) Gen-I Volley Nova Gorica	1–3	0–3
Saugella Team Monza (Italy)	6–0	(Slovenia) Calcit Kamnik	3–0	3–1
Le Cannet-Rocheville (France)	6–0	(Israel) Hapoel Kfar Saba	3–0	3–0

==== First leg ====
Date	Time		Score		Set 1	Set 2	Set 3	Set 4	Set 5	Total	Report
6 Feb	19:00	A.O. Thiras (Greece)	2–3	(Turkey) Aydın Büyükşehir Belediyespor	16–25	25–17	15–25	25–23	10–15	91–105	Report
7 Feb	20:00	Kanti Schaffhausen (Switzerland)	1–3	(Slovenia) Gen-I Volley Nova Gorica	22–25	20–25	25–12	19–25		86–87	Report
5 Feb	19:00	Saugella Team Monza (Italy)	3–0	(Slovenia) Calcit Kamnik	25–19	25–18	25–7			75–44	Report
6 Feb	20:00	Le Cannet-Rocheville (France)	3–0	(Israel) Hapoel Kfar Saba	27–25	25–13	28–26			80–64	Report

==== Second leg ====
Date	Time		Score		Set 1	Set 2	Set 3	Set 4	Set 5	Total	Report
13 Feb	19:00	Aydın Büyükşehir Belediyespor (Turkey)	3–0	(Greece) A.O. Thiras	25–16	25–15	25–19			75–50	Report
13 Feb	18:00	Gen-I Volley Nova Gorica (Slovenia)	3–0	(Switzerland) Kanti Schaffhausen	25–18	25–14	25–20			75–52	Report
13 Feb	17:00	Calcit Kamnik (Slovenia)	1–3	(Italy) Saugella Team Monza	14–25	25–23	23–25	22–25		84–98	Report
14 Feb	20:15	Hapoel Kfar Saba (Israel)	0–3	(France) Le Cannet-Rocheville	17–25	7–25	19–25			43–75	Report

== Final phase ==
=== Semifinals ===
Team 1	Agg.	Team 2	1st leg	2nd leg	Golden Set
Gen-I Volley Nova Gorica (Slovenia)	1–5	(Turkey) Aydın Büyükşehir Belediyespor	2–3	1–3	
Le Cannet-Rocheville (France)	3–3	(Italy) Saugella Team Monza	2–3	3–2	9–15

==== First leg ====
Date	Time		Score		Set 1	Set 2	Set 3	Set 4	Set 5	Total	Report
27 Feb	18:00	Gen-I Volley Nova Gorica (Slovenia)	2–3	(Turkey) Aydın Büyükşehir Belediyespor	25–19	25–27	23–25	25–16	8–15	106–102	Report
27 Feb	19:00	Le Cannet-Rocheville (France)	2–3	(Italy) Saugella Team Monza	20–25	25–22	19–25	25–23	13–15	102–110	Report

==== Second leg ====
Date	Time		Score		Set 1	Set 2	Set 3	Set 4	Set 5	Total	Report
6 Mar	19:00	Aydın Büyükşehir Belediyespor (Turkey)	3–1	(Slovenia) Gen-I Volley Nova Gorica	25–14	20–25	25–22	25–19		95–80	Report
6 Mar	20:30	Saugella Team Monza (Italy)	2–3	(France) Le Cannet-Rocheville	25–16	15–25	21–25	25–18	13–15	99–99	Report
Golden set		Saugella Team Monza (Italy)	15–9	(France) Le Cannet-Rocheville							

=== Finals ===
Team 1	Agg.	Team 2	1st leg	2nd leg
Aydın Büyükşehir Belediyespor (Turkey)	0–6	(Italy) Saugella Team Monza	0–3	1–3

==== First leg ====
Date	Time		Score		Set 1	Set 2	Set 3	Set 4	Set 5	Total	Report
20 Mar	19:30	Aydın Büyükşehir Belediyespor (Turkey)	0–3	(Italy) Saugella Team Monza	15–25	23–25	17–25			55–75	Report

==== Second leg ====
Date	Time		Score		Set 1	Set 2	Set 3	Set 4	Set 5	Total	Report
27 Mar	20:30	Saugella Team Monza (Italy)	3–1	(Turkey) Aydın Büyükşehir Belediyespor	25–20	17–25	25–22	25–15		92–82	Report
