= CSM București (women's volleyball) =

Romanian volleyball club

- Full name: Clubul Sportiv Municipal București
- Short name: CSM
- Nickname: Tigroaicele (The Tigresses)
- Founded: 2007; 18 years ago
- Dissolved: 2019
- Ground: Sala Polivalentă (Capacity: 5,300)
- Manager: Dehri Can Dehrioğlu
- League: Divizia A1
- Website: Club home page

Uniforms
Home	Away

Clubul Sportiv Municipal București, commonly known as CSM București and familiarly as CSM, was a professional volleyball club based in Bucharest, Romania, that played in the Divizia A1.

== Trophies ==
=== Domestic ===
- Divizia A1

Winners (1): 2018

- Cupa României

Winners (1): 2018

=== European ===
- CEV Challenge Cup

Winners (1): 2016

== Team ==
=== Current squad ===
Squad for the 2023-24 season

- (Romania) Alexandra Sobo
- (Croatia) Matea Ikić
- (Romania) Luna Zadorojnai
- (Romania) Misheel Tserennadmid
- (Romania) Ioana Marin
- (Romania) Adriana Alexandru
- (Romania) Cristina Radu
- (Romania) Otet Eliza
- (Japan) Anna Kikuchi
- (France) Guewe Diouf
- (United States) Ashley Evans
- (Brazil) Marjorie Corrêa
- (Brazil) Daniela Terra

== Notable players ==
- (Romania) Alexandra Sobo
- (Romania) Adina Salaoru
- (Romania) Ioana Baciu
- (Romania) Roxana Bacșiș
- (Romania) Francesca Alupei
- (Romania) Alexia Căruțașu
- (Japan) Kanami Tashiro
- (Japan) Kotoe Inoue
- (Japan) Naoko Hashimoto
- (Serbia) Jovana Brakočević
- (Serbia) Suzana Ćebić
- (Serbia) Jasna Majstorović
- (Netherlands) Maret Balkestein-Grothues
- (Netherlands) Nicole Koolhaas
- (Italy) Noemi Signorile
- (Cuba) Zoila Barros
- (Argentina) Emilce Sosa
- (Turkey) Ferhat Akbaş
- (Bulgaria) Atanas Petrov
