= CSU Galați (volleyball) =

Romanian volleyball club

- Full name: Clubul Sportiv Universitar Galați
- Founded: 1953; 72 years ago 2011; 14 years ago
- Ground: Dunărea (Capacity: 1,500)
- Chairman: Mihai Pantea
- Manager: Ileana Berdilă
- League: Divizia A1
- 2018–19: Divizia A1, 8th
- Website: Club home page

CSU Galați is a Romanian women's volleyball club based in Galaţi. The club plays in the Divizia A1, the highest Romanian league. The club won the Divizia A1 in four occasions, the Romanian Cup three times and has also played in European competitions before it was dissolved in 2010. The club was refounded later and promoted back to Divizia A1 at the end of the 2017–18 Divizia A2 season.

== Honours ==
=== National competitions ===
- Romanian Championship: 4

2006–07, 2007–08, 2008–09, 2009–10

- Romanian Cup: 3

2006–07, 2007–08, 2008–09

== Notable former players ==
- (Romania) Iuliana Nucu
- (Romania) Alida Marcovici
- (Romania) Alina Albu
- (Romania) Nneka Onyejekwe
- (Romania) Sabina Miclea
- (Romania) Alexandra Trică
- (Serbia) Mira Golubović
- (Serbia) Ivana Đerisilo
- (Serbia) Brižitka Molnar
- (Serbia) Maja Ognjenović
- (Serbia) Suzana Ćebić
- (Serbia) Sanja Malagurski
- (Serbia) Stefana Veljković
- (Bulgaria) Mariya Filipova
- (Poland) Milena Sadurek
- (Belgium) Frauke Dirickx
- (Cuba) Maybelis Martínez
- (Venezuela) Verónica Gómez
