= CS Dinamo București (women's volleyball) =

Romanian volleyball club

Dinamo București
- Full name: CS Dinamo București
- Short name: Dinamo
- Founded: 1948; 77 years ago
- Ground: Dinamo Polyvalent Hall (Capacity: 2,538)
- Manager: (Serbia) Miloš Gavrilović
- League: Divizia A1
- 2023-24: Divizia A1, 8th
- Website: Club home page

Uniforms
Home	Away

CS Dinamo București is a professional women's volleyball club based in Bucharest, Romania.

== Honours ==
=== National competitions ===
- Romanian Championship: 21

1957, 1958, 1960, 1961, 1962, 1963, 1966, 1967, 1969, 1975, 1976, 1977, 1978, 1979, 1980, 1981, 1982, 1983, 1984, 1985, 1989

- Romanian Cup: 2

2010, 2012

=== International competitions ===
- CEV Champions League:

Semifinalists: 1961, 1962
Quarterfinalists: 1967, 1977, 1979, 1982, 1990

- CEV Cup:

Bronze: 1974
Quarterfinalists: 1975, 1991

- Challenge Cup:

Quarterfinalists: 2007, 2008

== Team ==
=== Current squad ===
Squad for the 2024-25 season

- (Romania) Ana Cristina Miron
- (Romania) Andreea-Raluca Puică
- (Romania) Ramona-Adelina Rus
- (Romania) Beatrice-Ramona Postea
- (Romania) Bianca Grama
- (Romania) Mihaela Otcuparu
- (Romania) Minca Cristea
- (Spain) Paola Martínez Vela
- (Hungary) Réka Szedmák
- (Ukraine) Olga Skrypak
- (Ukraine) Anastasiia Maievska
- (Slovenia) Mirta Velikonja Grbac
- (Brazil) Tássia Silva

== Notable former players ==
- (Romania) Alina Albu
- (Poland) Sylwia Wojcieska
- (Poland) Iwona Waligóra
- (Poland) Anna Podolec
- (Romania) Cristina Pîrv
- (Romania) Iuliana Nucu
- (Serbia) Vesna Čitaković
- (Serbia) Maja Simanić
- (Slovakia) Alica Székelyová
- (Slovakia) Ivana Zburová
- (Slovakia) Dominika Valachová
- (Romania) Nicoleta Manu
- (Moldova) Tatiana Lupu
- (Japan) Rye Kato
- (Bulgaria) Elena Koleva
- (Bulgaria) Radostina Rangelova-Chiţigoi
- (Bulgaria) Mariya Karakasheva
- (Brazil) Mari Helen Pedra Mendes
- (United States) Regan Hood

== See also ==
- CS Dinamo București (men's volleyball)
- CS Dinamo București (men's handball)
- Romania women's national volleyball team
