= CSM Volei Alba Blaj =

Romanian volleyball club

- Full name: Clubul Sportiv Municipal Volei Alba Blaj
- Short name: CSM; Alba Blaj
- Founded: 2011; 14 years ago
- Ground: Sala Transilvania (Capacity: 1,850)
- Chairman: (Romania) Sergiu Ștefănescu
- Manager: (Spain) Guillermo Naranjo Hernández
- League: Divizia A1
- 2023-2024: Divizia A1, 2nd

Uniforms
Home	Away

Clubul Sportiv Municipal Volei Alba Blaj, commonly known as CSM Volei Alba Blaj, is a professional women's volleyball club based in Blaj, Transylvania, Romania, that competed in the CEV Cup.

== History ==
In 2018, Alba reached the CEV Champions League Final Four for the first time in their history.

On 5 May 2018, they achieved a historic success for Romania by advancing to the final with 3–1 victory over Galatasaray SK Istanbul in Bucharest. In its first-ever appearance in a continental championship match, Blaj lost in Sunday's grand final at Polyvalent Hall. Vakıfbank Istanbul — Champions League holders in 2017 and runners-up in 2016 — topped Alba 25–17, 25–11, 25–17.

Also in 2018, the Blaj City Council and the Alba County Council decided together to support the construction of a new, 2000-seat arena. The new arena is expected to be ready for 2020.

== Honours ==
=== Domestic ===
- Divizia A1

Winners (7): 2015, 2016, 2017, 2019, 2020, 2022, 2023

- Cupa României

Winners (5): 2017, 2019, 2021, 2022, 2025

- Supercupa României

Winners (1): 2021

=== European ===
- CEV Champions League

Runners-Up (1): 2018

- CEV Cup

Runners-Up (2): 2019, 2023

- CEV Challenge Cup

Runners-Up (1): 2021

== European Records ==
On 6 May 2018, in the final game of the 2018 Champions League, CSM Volei Alba Blaj attained the record of the worst score in a volleyball European cup final since the Rally Point System was adopted, with only 45 points: VakifBank Istanbul – CSM Volei Alba Blaj 3–0 (25–17, 25–11, 25–17).

On 19 March 2019, in the home game of the final match of the 2019 CEV Cup, CSM Volei Alba Blaj attained the record of the worst score in a CEV Cup final (women's) since the Rally Point System was adopted, with only 49 points. CSM Volei Alba Blaj – Unet e-work Busto Arsizio 0–3 (19–25, 16–25, 14–25).

On 12 April 2023, in the away game of the final match of the 2023 CEV Cup, CSM Volei Alba Blaj broke their own record with a new worst score in a CEV Cup final (women's) since the Rally Point System was adopted, with only 41 points. Savino Del Bene Scandicci – CSM Volei Alba Blaj 3–0 (25–18, 25–12, 25–11). This is also the record of the worst score in all European cups' finals. The team's coach was the Serbian Stevan Ljubičić.

On 17 March 2021, in the home game of the final match of the 2021 Challenge Cup, CSM Volei Alba Blaj attained the record of the worst score in a Challenge Cup final since the Rally Point System was adopted, with only 46 points. CSM Volei Alba Blaj – System9 Yesilyurt 0–3 (12–25, 18–25, 16–25). This record was equaled one week later, on 24 March 2021, in the away game: System9 Yesilyurt – CSM Volei Alba Blaj: 3–0 (25–17, 25–17, 25–12).

== Team ==
=== Current squad ===
Squad for the 2024-25 season

- (Romania) Roxana Daiana Roman
- (Romania) Raisa-Laura Ioan
- (Romania) Diana-Teodora Vereș
- (Romania) Alexandra Ciucu
- (Romania) Lidia-Paula Partnoi
- (Romania) Daria Maria Ocenic
- (Bosnia and Herzegovina) Iman Isanović
- (Azerbaijan) Yelyzaveta Samadova-Ruban
- (Azerbaijan) Olena Kharchenko
- (Bulgaria) Monika Krasteva
- (Brazil) Drussyla Costa
- (Brazil) Mara Ferreira Leão
- (Serbia) Isidora Kockarević
- (Slovakia) Lenka Skalická
- (Czech Republic) Kateřina Valková
- (Poland) Marta Matejko

== Selected former players ==
- (Romania) Adina Salaoru
- (Romania) Roxana Bacșiș
- (Cuba) Ana Cleger
- (Brazil) Samara Almeida
- (Bulgaria) Gergana Dimitrova
- (Germany) Lena Möllers
- (Russia) Victoriia Russu
- (Serbia) Tijana Malešević
- (Serbia) Nataša Krsmanović
- (Serbia) Bojana Milenković
- (Serbia) Jovana Vesović
- (Serbia) Ana Antonijević
- (Serbia) Ana Lazarević
- (Turkey) Selime İlyasoğlu

== See also ==
- Romania women's national volleyball team
