= CSM Târgoviște (women's volleyball) =

Romanian volleyball club

- Full name: Clubul Sportiv Municipal Târgoviște
- Short name: CSM
- Founded: 1991; 34 years ago
- Ground: Sala Sporturilor (Capacity: 2,000)
- Chairman: (Romania) Cristian Savu
- Manager: (Serbia) Branko Kovačević
- League: Divizia A1
- 2023–24: Divizia A1, 4th
- Website: Club home page

Uniforms
Home	Away

Clubul Sportiv Municipal Târgoviște, commonly known as CSM Târgoviște, is a professional volleyball club based in Târgoviște, Romania, that competes in the CEV Cup.

== Honours ==
=== Domestic ===
- Cupa României

Winners (2): 2016, 2024

- Supercupa României

Winners (1): 2016

== Team ==
=== Current squad ===
Squad for the 2024-25 season

- (Romania) Georgiana Faleș
- (Romania) Ana-Marisa Radu
- (Romania) Andreea Ispas
- (Romania) Marina-Elena Anghelache
- (Romania) Denisa Bizdrigheanu
- (Romania) Ema Gidiuta
- (Romania) Lorena Ilinca
- (Serbia) Ljubica Milojević
- (Serbia) Ana Malešević
- (United States) Adeola Owokoniran
- (United States) Maya Taylor
- (United States) Riley Wagoner
- (Spain) María Priscilla Schlegel

== See also ==
- Romania women's national volleyball team
