= Divizia A1 (women's volleyball) =

- Current season, competition or edition: 2025–26 Divizia A1 (women's volleyball)
- Sport: Volleyball
- Founded: 1950
- CEO: Gheorghe Vișan
- No. of teams: 11
- Country: Romania
- Continent: (European Union) CEV
- Most recent champions: CSO Voluntari (2nd title)
- Most titles: Dinamo București (21 titles)
- Broadcaster: TVR Sport
- Related competitions: Romanian Volleyball Cup
- Website: www.frvolei.ro (in Romanian)

The Divizia A1 is the women's top Romanian professional volleyball league.

== Past winners ==
- 1950: Locomotiva CFR București (1)
- 1951: Progresul ICAS București (1)
- 1952: Progresul Sănătatea București (2)
- 1953: Progresul CPCS București (3)
- 1954: Știința ICF București (1)
- 1955: Progresul CPCS București (4)
- 1956: Progresul CPCS București (5)
- 1957: Dinamo București (1)
- 1958: Dinamo București (2)
- 1959: Rapid București (2)
- 1960: Dinamo București (3)
- 1961: Dinamo București (4)
- 1962: Dinamo București (5)
- 1963: Dinamo București (6)
- 1964: not held
- 1965: Rapid București (3)
- 1966: Dinamo București (7)
- 1967: Dinamo București (8)
- 1968: Rapid București (4)
- 1969: Dinamo București (9)
- 1970: Penicilina Iași (1)
- 1971: Penicilina Iași (2)
- 1972: Rapid București (5)
- 1973: Rapid București (6)
- 1974: Rapid București (7)
- 1975: Dinamo București (10)
- 1976: Dinamo București(11)
- 1977: Dinamo București (12)
- 1978: Dinamo București (13)
- 1979: Dinamo București (14)
- 1980: Dinamo București (15)
- 1981: Dinamo București (16)
- 1982: Dinamo București (17)
- 1983: Dinamo București (18)
- 1984: Dinamo București (19)
- 1985: Dinamo București (20)
- 1986: Universitatea Craiova (1)
- 1987: Universitatea Craiova (2)
- 1988: Universitatea Craiova (3)
- 1989: Dinamo București (21)
- 1990: Universitatea Craiova (4)
- 1991: Universitatea Craiova (5)
- 1992: Rapid București (8)
- 1993: Rapid București (9)
- 1994: Rapid București (10)
- 1995: Rapid București (11)
- 1996: Rapid București (12)
- 1997: RATB Grundfos București (1)
- 1998: Universitatea Bacău (1)
- 1999: Rapid București (13)
- 2000: Rapid București (14)
- 2001: Rapid București (15)
- 2002: RATB Petrom București (2)
- 2003: VC Unic Piatra Neamț (1)
- 2004: AIBO Rapid RATB București (16)
- 2005: Știința Bacău (2)
- 2006: Rapid AIBO București (17)
- 2007: Metal Galați (1)
- 2008: Metal Galați (2)
- 2009: Metal Galați (3)
- 2010: Metal Galați (4)
- 2011: Tomis Constanta (1)
- 2012: Tomis Constanta (2)
- 2013: Știința Bacău (3)
- 2014: Știința Bacău (4)
- 2015: Volei Alba Blaj (1)
- 2016: Volei Alba Blaj (2)
- 2017: Volei Alba Blaj (3)
- 2018: CSM București (1)
- 2019: Volei Alba Blaj (4)
- 2020: Volei Alba Blaj (5)
- 2021: CSM Târgoviște (1)
- 2022: Volei Alba Blaj (6)
- 2023: Volei Alba Blaj (7)
- 2024: CSO Voluntari (1)
- 2025: Volei Alba Blaj (8)
- 2026: CSO Voluntari (2)

== See also ==
- Romanian Men's Volleyball League
