= CS Știința Bacău (women's volleyball) =

Romanian volleyball club

Știința Bacău
- Full name: Clubul Sportiv Știința Bacău
- Short name: Știința
- Founded: 1966
- Ground: Sala Sporturilor (Capacity: 2,000)
- League: Divizia A1
- Website: Club home page

Uniforms
Home	Away

Știința Bacău is a Romanian women's volleyball team based in Bacău, which competes in Divizia A1, the top Romanian women's volleyball championships.

The team represents the women's volleyball section of the multi-sport club CS Știința Bacău, which also include athletics, badminton, women's handball and karate. The club also had men's football and handball sections in the past. The team competed in the 2018–19 Women's CEV Cup.

== Honours ==
=== National competitions ===
- Romanian Championship: 4

1998, 2005, 2013, 2014

- Romanian Cup: 5

2005, 2006, 2013, 2014, 2015

== See also ==
- Romania women's national volleyball team
