= 2022–23 Women's CEV Cup =

European volleyball tournament

- League: Women's CEV Cup
- Sport: Volleyball
- Duration: 13 December 2022 – 12 April 2023
- Matches: 68
- Teams: 35
- Finals champions: (Italy) Savino Del Bene Scandicci
- Runners-up: (Romania) CS Volei Alba Blaj
- Finals MVP: (Italy) Ekaterina Antropova

Women's CEV Cup seasons
- ← 2021–22 2023–24 →

The 2022–23 Women's CEV Cup was the 51st edition of the European CEV Cup volleyball club tournament organised by the European Volleyball Confederation.

== Format ==
The CEV Cup is played in a knockout format. Each team plays a home and an away match with result points awarded for each leg (3 points for 3–0 or 3–1 wins, 2 points for 3–2 win, 1 point for 2–3 loss). After two legs, the team with the most result points advances to the next round. In case the teams are tied after two legs, a Golden Set is played immediately at the completion of the second leg. The Golden Set winner is the team that first obtains 15 points, provided that the points difference between the two teams is at least 2 points (thus, the Golden Set is similar to a tiebreak set in a regular match).

Main phase (Home and away matches):

- 16th finals → 8th finals → Playoffs → Quarterfinals

Final phase (Home and away matches):

- Semifinals → Finals

== Participating teams ==
35 teams participated in the 2022–23 edition of the tournament. 26 teams were allocated direct slots in the 16th finals and 5 teams joined via the 2022–23 CEV Champions League qualification. In the quarterfinals the 2nd to 5th ranked third placed teams from the league round of the 2022–23 CEV Champions League joined the competition (4 teams).

Rank	Country	No. of teams	Teams
1	Turkey	2	Galatasaray HDI Sigorta Istanbul, THY Istanbul
2	France	3	Pays d'Aix Venelles, Terville Florange, Volley Mulhouse Alsace (Note: Relegated from the league round of the 2022–23 CEV Champions League.)
2	Romania	3	CS Volei Alba Blaj, CSM Târgoviște, CSO Voluntari 2005
4	Hungary	2	Swietelsky-Békéscsaba, Szent Benedek Balatonfüred
5	Italy	2	e-work Busto Arsizio, Savino Del Bene Scandicci
6	Czech Republic	3	Dukla Liberec, Královo Pole Brno, VK UP Olomouc
7	Switzerland	2	Viteos Neuchatel UC, Volero Zürich
8	Germany	3	Dresdner SC, SC Potsdam, SSC Palmberg Schwerin
9	Slovenia	2	Calcit Kamnik (Note: Relegated from the qualification rounds of the 2022–23 CEV Champions League.), Nova KBM Branik Maribor
10	Belgium	2	VC Oudegem, VDK Gent Dames
11	Greece	2	AC PAOK Thessaloniki, Olympiacos Piraeus
12	Finland	2	Pölkky Kuusamo, LP Kangasala
15	Serbia	1	Železničar Lajkovac
16	Croatia	2	Marina Kaštela, Mladost Zagreb
17	Spain	2	CV Gran Canaria, CV Kiele Socuéllamos
18	Poland	1	Budowlani Łódź
22	Bosnia and Herzegovina	1	Bimal-Jedinstvo Brčko

== Bracket ==
The drawing of lots was held on 28 June 2022 in Luxembourg City.

16th finals
(Slovenia) Calcit Kamnik	1	0
(Greece) Olympiacos	3	3
(Greece) AC PAOK	3	1
(Czech Republic) Královo Pole	2	3
(Hungary) Szent Benedek	3	3
(Croatia) Marina Kaštela	1	1
(Czech Republic) Dukla Liberec	3	2
(France) Pays d'Aix Venelles	0	3
(Spain) CV Kiele	3	3
(Belgium) VC Oudegem	0	2
(Belgium) VDK Gent Dames	3	2
(Switzerland) Volero Zürich	1	3
(N/A) Bye	–	–
(Spain) CV Gran Canaria	–	–
(Poland) Budowlani Łódź	3	3
(Romania) CSO Voluntari 2005	0	2
(Croatia) Mladost Zagreb	3	3
(Finland) LP Kangasala	0	0
(Turkey) Galatasaray	1	0
(Italy) SDB Scandicci	3	3
(Germany) SSC P. Schwerin	3	2
(Serbia) Železničar	0	3
(Bosnia and Herzegovina) Bimal-Jedinstvo	1	0
(Hungary) Békéscsaba	3	3
(Finland) Pölkky Kuusamo	0	0
(Slovenia) Nova KBM Branik	3	3
(Italy) e-work B. Arsizio	3	3
(Germany) Dresdner SC	1	2
(Czech Republic) VK UP Olomouc	0	0
(France) Terville Florange	3	3
(Switzerland) Neuchatel UC	0	0
(Turkey) THY Istanbul	3	3

8th finals
(Greece) Olympiacos	3	3
(Czech Republic) Královo Pole	0	2
(Hungary) Szent Benedek	1	0
(Czech Republic) Dukla Liberec	3	3
(Spain) CV Kiele	3	1
(Belgium) VDK Gent Dames	2	3
(Spain) CV Gran Canaria	3	1	9
(Poland) Budowlani Łódź	1	3	15
(Croatia) Mladost Zagreb	0	1
(Italy) SDB Scandicci	3	3
(Germany) SSC P. Schwerin	3	3
(Hungary) Békéscsaba	0	2
(Slovenia) Nova KBM Branik	0	0
(Italy) e-work B. Arsizio	3	3
(France) Terville Florange	1	0
(Turkey) THY Istanbul	3	3

Playoffs
(Greece) Olympiacos	3	3
(Czech Republic) Dukla Liberec	0	1
(Belgium) VDK Gent Dames	0	0
(Poland) Budowlani Łódź	3	3
(Italy) SDB Scandicci	3	3
(Germany) SSC P. Schwerin	2	0
(Italy) e-work B. Arsizio	0	0
(Turkey) THY Istanbul	3	3

Quarterfinals
(Romania) CSM Târgoviște	3	3
(Greece) Olympiacos	2	1
(Romania) Volei Alba Blaj	3	3
(Poland) Budowlani Łódź	1	2
(Germany) SC Potsdam	0	1
(Italy) SDB Scandicci	3	3
(France) Mulhouse Alsace	0	0
(Turkey) THY Istanbul	3	3

Semifinals
(Romania) CSM Târgoviște	0	1
(Romania) Volei Alba Blaj	3	3
(Italy) SDB Scandicci	3	2
(Turkey) THY Istanbul	0	3

Finals
(Romania) Volei Alba Blaj	1	0
(Italy) SDB Scandicci	3	3

== Main phase ==
=== 16th finals ===
- The winners of the ties qualify for the 8th finals.
- In case the teams are tied after two legs, a Golden Set is played immediately at the completion of the second leg.
- All times are local.

Team 1	Agg.	Team 2	1st leg	2nd leg
Calcit Kamnik (Slovenia)	0–6	(Greece) Olympiacos Piraeus	1–3	0–3
AC PAOK Thessaloniki (Greece)	2–4	(Czech Republic) Královo Pole Brno	3–2	1–3
Szent Benedek Balatonfüred (Hungary)	6–0	(Croatia) Marina Kaštela	3–1	3–1
Dukla Liberec (Czech Republic)	4–2	(France) Pays d'Aix Venelles	3–0	2–3
CV Kiele Socuéllamos (Spain)	5–1	(Belgium) VC Oudegem	3–0	3–2
VDK Gent Dames (Belgium)	4–2	(Switzerland) Volero Zürich	3–1	2–3
	Bye	(Spain) CV Gran Canaria	–	–
Budowlani Łódź (Poland)	5–1	(Romania) CSO Voluntari 2005	3–0	3–2
Mladost Zagreb (Croatia)	6–0	(Finland) LP Kangasala	3–0	3–0
Galatasaray HDI Sigorta Istanbul (Turkey)	0–6	(Italy) Savino Del Bene Scandicci	1–3	0–3
SSC Palmberg Schwerin (Germany)	4–2	(Serbia) Železničar Lajkovac	3–0	2–3
Bimal-Jedinstvo Brčko (Bosnia and Herzegovina)	0–6	(Hungary) Swietelsky-Békéscsaba	1–3	0–3
Pölkky Kuusamo (Finland)	0–6	(Slovenia) Nova KBM Branik Maribor	0–3	0–3
e-work Busto Arsizio (Italy)	5–1	(Germany) Dresdner SC	3–1	3–2
VK UP Olomouc (Czech Republic)	0–6	(France) Terville Florange	0–3	0–3
Viteos Neuchatel UC (Switzerland)	0–6	(Turkey) THY Istanbul	0–3	0–3

==== First leg ====
Date	Time		Score		Set 1	Set 2	Set 3	Set 4	Set 5	Total	Report
13 Dec	20:00	Calcit Kamnik (Slovenia)	1–3	(Greece) Olympiacos Piraeus	18–25	25–20	27–29	20–25		90–99	Report
15 Dec	16:00	AC PAOK Thessaloniki (Greece)	3–2	(Czech Republic) Královo Pole Brno	14–25	15–25	25–22	25–10	15–11	94–93	Report
14 Dec	18:00	Szent Benedek Balatonfüred (Hungary)	3–1	(Croatia) Marina Kaštela	27–25	23–25	25–18	25–16		100–84	Report
15 Dec	20:00	Dukla Liberec (Czech Republic)	3–0	(France) Pays d'Aix Venelles	25–17	25–17	25–23			75–57	Report
15 Dec	20:00	CV Kiele Socuéllamos (Spain)	3–0	(Belgium) VC Oudegem	25–14	25–18	25–13			75–45	Report
14 Dec	20:30	VDK Gent Dames (Belgium)	3–1	(Switzerland) Volero Zürich	25–19	25–15	23–25	25–23		98–82	Report
14 Dec	18:00	Budowlani Łódź (Poland)	3–0	(Romania) CSO Voluntari 2005	25–21	25–16	25–11			75–48	Report
15 Dec	20:00	Mladost Zagreb (Croatia)	3–0	(Finland) LP Kangasala	25–17	25–14	25–16			75–47	Report
14 Dec	20:30	Galatasaray HDI Sigorta Istanbul (Turkey)	1–3	(Italy) Savino Del Bene Scandicci	17–25	15–25	25–19	12–25		69–94	Report
14 Dec	19:00	SSC Palmberg Schwerin (Germany)	3–0	(Serbia) Železničar Lajkovac	25–15	25–21	25–21			75–57	Report
14 Dec	19:00	Bimal-Jedinstvo Brčko (Bosnia and Herzegovina)	1–3	(Hungary) Swietelsky-Békéscsaba	8–25	14–25	25–23	16–25		63–98	Report
14 Dec	18:30	Pölkky Kuusamo (Finland)	0–3	(Slovenia) Nova KBM Branik Maribor	22–25	22–25	19–25			63–75	Report
14 Dec	20:30	e-work Busto Arsizio (Italy)	3–1	(Germany) Dresdner SC	25–18	25–20	16–25	25–23		91–86	Report
14 Dec	18:00	VK UP Olomouc (Czech Republic)	0–3	(France) Terville Florange	23–25	16–25	18–25			57–75	Report
15 Dec	20:00	Viteos Neuchatel UC (Switzerland)	0–3	(Turkey) THY Istanbul	15–25	18–25	21–25			54–75	Report

==== Second leg ====
Date	Time		Score		Set 1	Set 2	Set 3	Set 4	Set 5	Total	Report
20 Dec	20:00	Olympiacos Piraeus (Greece)	3–0	(Slovenia) Calcit Kamnik	25–21	25–20	25–16			75–57	Report
21 Dec	18:00	Královo Pole Brno (Czech Republic)	3–1	(Greece) AC PAOK Thessaloniki	25–19	23–25	25–19	34–32		107–95	Report
21 Dec	18:00	Marina Kaštela (Croatia)	1–3	(Hungary) Szent Benedek Balatonfüred	25–23	23–25	22–25	13–25		83–98	Report
21 Dec	20:00	Pays d'Aix Venelles (France)	3–2	(Czech Republic) Dukla Liberec	21–25	27–25	25–16	22–25	15–10	110–101	Report
22 Dec	20:00	VC Oudegem (Belgium)	2–3	(Spain) CV Kiele Socuéllamos	18–25	23–25	29–27	25–21	7–15	102–113	Report
20 Dec	20:30	Volero Zürich (Switzerland)	3–2	(Belgium) VDK Gent Dames	37–35	14–25	25–22	23–25	15–11	114–118	Report
21 Dec	17:00	CSO Voluntari 2005 (Romania)	2–3	(Poland) Budowlani Łódź	28–26	25–19	24–26	20–25	11–15	108–111	Report
20 Dec	18:30	LP Kangasala (Finland)	0–3	(Croatia) Mladost Zagreb	19–25	23–25	16–25			58–75	Report
22 Dec	20:00	Savino Del Bene Scandicci (Italy)	3–0	(Turkey) Galatasaray HDI Sigorta Istanbul	25–14	25–19	25–21			75–54	Report
21 Dec	19:00	Železničar Lajkovac (Serbia)	3–2	(Germany) SSC Palmberg Schwerin	25–13	23–25	25–22	26–28	15–9	114–97	Report
21 Dec	18:00	Swietelsky-Békéscsaba (Hungary)	3–0	(Bosnia and Herzegovina) Bimal-Jedinstvo Brčko	25–15	25–14	25–16			75–45	Report
21 Dec	18:00	Nova KBM Branik Maribor (Slovenia)	3–0	(Finland) Pölkky Kuusamo	25–21	25–13	26–24			76–58	Report
21 Dec	19:00	Dresdner SC (Germany)	2–3	(Italy) e-work Busto Arsizio	20–25	22–25	25–21	25–20	13–15	105–106	Report
21 Dec	19:30	Terville Florange (France)	3–0	(Czech Republic) VK UP Olomouc	28–26	26–24	28–26			82–76	Report
20 Dec	18:00	THY Istanbul (Turkey)	3–0	(Switzerland) Viteos Neuchatel UC	25–20	25–20	25–14			75–54	Report

=== 8th finals ===
- The winners of the ties qualify for the playoffs.
- In case the teams are tied after two legs, a Golden Set is played immediately at the completion of the second leg.
- All times are local.

Team 1	Agg.	Team 2	1st leg	2nd leg	Golden Set
Olympiacos Piraeus (Greece)	5–1	(Czech Republic) Královo Pole Brno	3–0	3–2	
Szent Benedek Balatonfüred (Hungary)	0–6	(Czech Republic) Dukla Liberec	1–3	0–3	
CV Kiele Socuéllamos (Spain)	2–4	(Belgium) VDK Gent Dames	3–2	1–3	
CV Gran Canaria (Spain)	3–3	(Poland) Budowlani Łódź	3–1	1–3	9–15
Mladost Zagreb (Croatia)	0–6	(Italy) Savino Del Bene Scandicci	0–3	1–3	
SSC Palmberg Schwerin (Germany)	5–1	(Hungary) Swietelsky-Békéscsaba	3–0	3–2	
Nova KBM Branik Maribor (Slovenia)	0–6	(Italy) e-work Busto Arsizio	0–3	0–3	
Terville Florange (France)	0–6	(Turkey) THY Istanbul	1–3	0–3	

==== First leg ====
Date	Time		Score		Set 1	Set 2	Set 3	Set 4	Set 5	Total	Report
11 Jan	19:00	Olympiacos Piraeus (Greece)	3–0	(Czech Republic) Královo Pole Brno	25–15	25–18	25–19			75–52	Report
12 Jan	18:00	Szent Benedek Balatonfüred (Hungary)	1–3	(Czech Republic) Dukla Liberec	23–25	25–20	15–25	21–25		84–95	Report
11 Jan	20:00	CV Kiele Socuéllamos (Spain)	3–2	(Belgium) VDK Gent Dames	20–25	23–25	25–15	25–19	15–13	108–97	Report
11 Jan	18:00	CV Gran Canaria (Spain)	3–1	(Poland) Budowlani Łódź	20–25	25–10	25–21	25–22		95–78	Report
10 Jan	20:30	Mladost Zagreb (Croatia)	0–3	(Italy) Savino Del Bene Scandicci	19–25	22–25	19–25			60–75	Report
11 Jan	19:00	SSC Palmberg Schwerin (Germany)	3–0	(Hungary) Swietelsky-Békéscsaba	25–20	27–25	25–22			77–67	Report
10 Jan	18:00	Nova KBM Branik Maribor (Slovenia)	0–3	(Italy) e-work Busto Arsizio	21–25	17–25	19–25			57–75	Report
11 Jan	19:30	Terville Florange (France)	1–3	(Turkey) THY Istanbul	15–25	25–23	14–25	24–26		78–99	Report

==== Second leg ====
Date	Time		Score		Set 1	Set 2	Set 3	Set 4	Set 5	Total	Report
18 Jan	18:00	Královo Pole Brno (Czech Republic)	2–3	(Greece) Olympiacos Piraeus	25–23	23–25	24–26	25–22	7–15	104–111	Report
19 Jan	18:00	Dukla Liberec (Czech Republic)	3–0	(Hungary) Szent Benedek Balatonfüred	25–17	25–17	25–23			75–57	Report
18 Jan	20:30	VDK Gent Dames (Belgium)	3–1	(Spain) CV Kiele Socuéllamos	20–25	25–20	25–23	25–22		95–90	Report
18 Jan	18:00	Budowlani Łódź (Poland)	3–1	(Spain) CV Gran Canaria	25–12	25–21	20–25	25–16		95–74	Report
Golden set		Budowlani Łódź (Poland)	15–9	(Spain) CV Gran Canaria							
17 Jan	20:00	Savino Del Bene Scandicci (Italy)	3–1	(Croatia) Mladost Zagreb	25–15	25–14	20–25	25–15		95–69	Report
18 Jan	18:00	Swietelsky-Békéscsaba (Hungary)	2–3	(Germany) SSC Palmberg Schwerin	14–25	21–25	25–23	31–29	12–15	103–117	Report
18 Jan	20:30	e-work Busto Arsizio (Italy)	3–0	(Slovenia) Nova KBM Branik Maribor	25–11	25–14	25–17			75–42	Report
17 Jan	18:00	THY Istanbul (Turkey)	3–0	(France) Terville Florange	25–14	25–20	25–22			75–56	Report

=== Playoffs ===
- The winners of the ties qualify for the quarterfinals.
- In case the teams are tied after two legs, a Golden Set is played immediately at the completion of the second leg.
- All times are local.

Team 1	Agg.	Team 2	1st leg	2nd leg
Olympiacos Piraeus (Greece)	6–0	(Czech Republic) Dukla Liberec	3–0	3–1
VDK Gent Dames (Belgium)	0–6	(Poland) Budowlani Łódź	0–3	0–3
Savino Del Bene Scandicci (Italy)	5–1	(Germany) SSC Palmberg Schwerin	3–2	3–0
e-work Busto Arsizio (Italy)	0–6	(Turkey) THY Istanbul	0–3	0–3

==== First leg ====
Date	Time		Score		Set 1	Set 2	Set 3	Set 4	Set 5	Total	Report
1 Feb	19:00	Olympiacos Piraeus (Greece)	3–0	(Czech Republic) Dukla Liberec	25–19	25–13	25–15			75–47	Report
31 Jan	20:30	VDK Gent Dames (Belgium)	0–3	(Poland) Budowlani Łódź	20–25	18–25	18–25			56–75	Report
1 Feb	20:00	Savino Del Bene Scandicci (Italy)	3–2	(Germany) SSC Palmberg Schwerin	25–21	25–21	24–26	16–25	15–11	105–104	Report
1 Feb	20:30	e-work Busto Arsizio (Italy)	0–3	(Turkey) THY Istanbul	20–25	14–25	21–25			55–75	Report

==== Second leg ====
Date	Time		Score		Set 1	Set 2	Set 3	Set 4	Set 5	Total	Report
8 Feb	18:00	Dukla Liberec (Czech Republic)	1–3	(Greece) Olympiacos Piraeus	22–25	23–25	25–20	18–25		88–95	Report
7 Feb	18:00	Budowlani Łódź (Poland)	3–0	(Belgium) VDK Gent Dames	25–20	25–17	25–21			75–58	Report
8 Feb	19:00	SSC Palmberg Schwerin (Germany)	0–3	(Italy) Savino Del Bene Scandicci	19–25	27–29	19–25			65–79	Report
15 Feb	19:00	THY Istanbul (Turkey)	3–0	(Italy) e-work Busto Arsizio	25–18	25–22	25–20			75–60	Report

=== Quarterfinals ===
- The four winners of the playoffs face the 2nd to 5th ranked third placed teams from the league round of the 2022–23 CEV Champions League.
- The winners of the ties qualify for the semifinals.
- In case the teams are tied after two legs, a Golden Set is played immediately at the completion of the second leg.
- All times are local.

Team 1	Agg.	Team 2	1st leg	2nd leg
CSM Târgoviște (Romania)	5–1	(Greece) Olympiacos Piraeus	3–2	3–1
CS Volei Alba Blaj (Romania)	5–1	(Poland) Budowlani Łódź	3–1	3–2
SC Potsdam (Germany)	0–6	(Italy) Savino Del Bene Scandicci	0–3	1–3
Volley Mulhouse Alsace (France)	0–6	(Turkey) THY Istanbul	0–3	0–3

==== First leg ====
Date	Time		Score		Set 1	Set 2	Set 3	Set 4	Set 5	Total	Report
22 Feb	18:00	CSM Târgoviște (Romania)	3–2	(Greece) Olympiacos Piraeus	25–19	23–25	18–25	25–17	15–9	106–95	Report
22 Feb	19:00	CS Volei Alba Blaj (Romania)	3–1	(Poland) Budowlani Łódź	25–23	25–13	25–27	25–19		100–82	Report
21 Feb	19:30	SC Potsdam (Germany)	0–3	(Italy) Savino Del Bene Scandicci	27–29	24–26	19–25			70–80	Report
21 Feb	19:00	Volley Mulhouse Alsace (France)	0–3	(Turkey) THY Istanbul	18–25	15–25	16–25			49–75	Report

==== Second leg ====
Date	Time		Score		Set 1	Set 2	Set 3	Set 4	Set 5	Total	Report
2 Mar	19:30	Olympiacos Piraeus (Greece)	1–3	(Romania) CSM Târgoviște	24–26	13–25	25–19	16–25		78–95	Report
1 Mar	18:00	Budowlani Łódź (Poland)	2–3	(Romania) CS Volei Alba Blaj	25–21	23–25	22–25	25–21	10–15	105–107	Report
1 Mar	20:00	Savino Del Bene Scandicci (Italy)	3–1	(Germany) SC Potsdam	25–17	25–14	22–25	25–17		97–73	Report
1 Mar	18:00	THY Istanbul (Turkey)	3–0	(France) Volley Mulhouse Alsace	25–19	25–22	25–22			75–63	Report

== Final phase ==
=== Semifinals ===
- The winners of the ties qualify for the finals.
- In case the teams are tied after two legs, a Golden Set is played immediately at the completion of the second leg.
- All times are local.

Team 1	Agg.	Team 2	1st leg	2nd leg
CSM Târgoviște (Romania)	0–6	(Romania) CS Volei Alba Blaj	0–3	1–3
Savino Del Bene Scandicci (Italy)	4–2	(Turkey) THY Istanbul	3–0	2–3

==== First leg ====
Date	Time		Score		Set 1	Set 2	Set 3	Set 4	Set 5	Total	Report
15 Mar	18:00	CSM Târgoviște (Romania)	0–3	(Romania) CS Volei Alba Blaj	15–25	18–25	22–25			55–75	Report
14 Mar	20:00	Savino Del Bene Scandicci (Italy)	3–0	(Turkey) THY Istanbul	27–25	25–12	25–18			77–55	Report

==== Second leg ====
Date	Time		Score		Set 1	Set 2	Set 3	Set 4	Set 5	Total	Report
23 Mar	19:00	CS Volei Alba Blaj (Romania)	3–1	(Romania) CSM Târgoviște	25–21	25–23	19–25	25–20		94–89	Report
22 Mar	19:00	THY Istanbul (Turkey)	3–2	(Italy) Savino Del Bene Scandicci	25–21	18–25	26–24	23–25	15–10	107–105	Report

=== Finals ===
- In case the teams are tied after two legs, a Golden Set is played immediately at the completion of the second leg.
- All times are local.

Team 1	Agg.	Team 2	1st leg	2nd leg
CS Volei Alba Blaj (Romania)	0–6	(Italy) Savino Del Bene Scandicci	1–3	0–3

==== First leg ====
Date	Time		Score		Set 1	Set 2	Set 3	Set 4	Set 5	Total	Report
5 Apr	19:00	CS Volei Alba Blaj (Romania)	1–3	(Italy) Savino Del Bene Scandicci	12–25	19–25	25–21	18–25		74–96	Report

==== Second leg ====
Date	Time		Score		Set 1	Set 2	Set 3	Set 4	Set 5	Total	Report
12 Apr	20:30	Savino Del Bene Scandicci (Italy)	3–0	(Romania) CS Volei Alba Blaj	25–18	25–12	25–11			75–41	Report

== Final standings ==
Rank	Team
1st place, gold medalist(s)	(Italy) Savino Del Bene Scandicci
2nd place, silver medalist(s)	(Romania) CS Volei Alba Blaj
Semifinalists	(Romania) CSM Târgoviște (Turkey) THY Istanbul

2022–23 CEV Cup winners
(Italy)
Savino Del Bene Scandicci
1st title

== See also ==
- 2022–23 CEV Champions League
- 2022–23 CEV Cup
- 2022–23 CEV Challenge Cup
- 2022–23 CEV Women's Champions League
- 2022–23 CEV Women's Challenge Cup
