= 2018–19 Women's CEV Cup =

- League: Women's CEV Cup
- Sport: Volleyball
- Duration: 6 November 2018 – 26 March 2019
- Number of teams: 27
- Finals champions: (Italy) Unet E-Work Busto Arsizio (3rd title}
- Runners-up: (Romania) CSM Volei Alba Blaj
- Finals MVP: (Belgium) Britt Herbots

Women's CEV Cup seasons
- ← 2017–18 2019–20 →

The 2018–19 Women's CEV Cup was the 47th edition of the European CEV Cup volleyball club tournament, the former "Top Teams Cup".

== Format ==
The tournament is played on a knockout format, with 27 teams participating. Initially 20 teams were allocated direct vacancies to enter the competition, with another 7 teams joining the competition via Champions League qualification. On 29 June 2018, a drawing of lots in Luxembourg City, Luxembourg, determined the team's pairing for each match. Each team plays a home and an away match with result points awarded for each leg (3 points for 3–0 or 3–1 wins, 2 points for 3–2 win, 1 point for 2–3 loss). After two legs, the team with the most result points advances to the next round. In case the teams are tied after two legs, a Golden Set is played immediately at the completion of the second leg. The Golden Set winner is the team that first obtains 15 points, provided that the points difference between the two teams is at least 2 points (thus, the Golden Set is similar to a tiebreak set in a normal match).

== Participating teams ==
- Drawing of lots for the 27 participating team was held in Luxembourg City, Luxembourg on 29 June 2018.
- 20 teams allocated vacancies spots and 7 teams qualified as Champions League qualification losers.

The number of participants on the basis of ranking list for European Cup Competitions:

Rank	Country	Number of teams	Teams
1	Turkey	1	Galatasaray Daikin Istanbul
2	Italy	1	Unet E-Work Busto Arsizio
3	Russia	1	Yenisey Krasnoyarsk
6	France	2	ASPTT Mulhouse, Saint-Raphaël Var Volley-Ball
7	Switzerland	2	TS Volley Düdingen, Sm'Aesch Pfeffingen
8	Romania	3	CSM Volei Alba Blaj, CSM Târgoviște, CS Știința Bacău
9	Germany	1	Dresdner SC
10	Serbia	1	Železničar Lajkovac
11	Czech Republic	3	UP Olomouc, VK Prostejov, TJ Ostrava
12	Slovenia	1	Nova KBM Branik Maribor
14	Bulgaria	1	Levski Sofia
15	Finland	1	LP Salo
16	Hungary	2	Fatum-Nyíregyháza, Békéscsabai RSE
17	Bosnia and Herzegovina	1	ŽOK Bimal-Jedinstvo Brčko
17	Netherlands	1	Sliedrecht Sport
20	Belgium	2	VC Oudegem, Asterix Avo Beveren
20	Ukraine	1	VC Khimik Yuzhny
25	Austria	1	UVC Holding Graz
25	Norway	1	Førde VBK

== Main phase ==
=== 16th Finals ===
Team 1	Agg.	Team 2	1st leg	2nd leg	Golden Set
Levski Sofia (Bulgaria)	0–6	(Czech Republic) VK Prostejov	0–3	0–3	
Nova KBM Branik Maribor (Slovenia)	0–6	(Russia) Yenisey Krasnoyarsk	0–3	0–3	
CSM Târgoviște (Romania)	0–6	(Turkey) Galatasaray Daikin Istanbul	0–3	0–3	
Železničar Lajkovac (Serbia)	1–5	(Romania) CS Știința Bacău	2–3	0–3	
LP Salo (Finland)	0–6	(Belgium) Asterix Avo Beveren	1–3	0–3	
VC Oudegem (Belgium)	3–3	(Switzerland) Sm'Aesch Pfeffingen	3–1	0–3	9–15
VC Khimik Yuzhny (Ukraine)	3–3	(Hungary) Békéscsabai RSE	3–1	0–3	9–15
Førde VBK (Norway)	2–4	(France) Saint-Raphaël Var Volley-Ball	3–2	0–3	
Unet E-Work Busto Arsizio (Italy)	5–1	(Germany) Dresdner SC	3–2	3–0	
TJ Ostrava (Czech Republic)	2–4	(Austria) UVC Holding Graz	3–2	1–3	
TS Volley Düdingen (Switzerland)	0–6	(Hungary) Fatum-Nyíregyháza	1–3	0–3	

==== First leg ====
Date	Time		Score		Set 1	Set 2	Set 3	Set 4	Set 5	Total	Report
29 Nov	17:00	Levski Sofia (Bulgaria)	0–3	(Czech Republic) VK Prostejov	18–25	18–25	16–25			52–75	Report
28 Nov	18:00	Nova KBM Branik Maribor (Slovenia)	0–3	(Russia) Yenisey Krasnoyarsk	20–25	23–25	22–25			65–75	Report
27 Nov	18:00	CSM Târgoviște (Romania)	0–3	(Turkey) Galatasaray Daikin Istanbul	23–25	21–25	24–26			68–76	Report
28 Nov	19:00	Železničar Lajkovac (Serbia)	2–3	(Romania) CS Știința Bacău	25–15	22–25	21–25	25–13	10–15	103–93	Report
29 Nov	19:00	LP Salo (Finland)	1–3	(Belgium) Asterix Avo Beveren	25–23	21–25	17–25	22–25		85–98	Report
28 Nov	20:30	VC Oudegem (Belgium)	3–1	(Switzerland) Sm'Aesch Pfeffingen	25–20	25–17	25–27	25–15		100–79	Report
27 Nov	18:00	VC Khimik Yuzhny (Ukraine)	3–1	(Hungary) Békéscsabai RSE	28–26	20–25	25–15	25–23		98–89	Report
28 Nov	20:00	Førde VBK (Norway)	3–2	(France) Saint-Raphaël Var Volley-Ball	23–25	15–25	25–7	25–0	25–0	113–57	Report
28 Nov	20:30	Unet E-Work Busto Arsizio (Italy)	3–2	(Germany) Dresdner SC	25–21	24–26	25–22	23–25	15–10	112–104	Report
28 Nov	18:00	TJ Ostrava (Czech Republic)	3–2	(Austria) UVC Holding Graz	28–26	16–25	18–25	25–15	15–9	102–100	Report
28 Nov	20:00	TS Volley Düdingen (Switzerland)	1–3	(Hungary) Fatum-Nyíregyháza	27–29	25–14	19–25	22–25		93–93	Report

==== Second leg ====
Date	Time		Score		Set 1	Set 2	Set 3	Set 4	Set 5	Total	Report
5 Dec	17:00	VK Prostejov (Czech Republic)	3–0	(Bulgaria) Levski Sofia	25–14	25–17	25–15			75–46	Report
5 Dec	19:00	Yenisey Krasnoyarsk (Russia)	3–0	(Slovenia) Nova KBM Branik Maribor	26–24	25–19	25–13			76–56	Report
4 Dec	19:00	Galatasaray Daikin Istanbul (Turkey)	3–0	(Romania) CSM Târgoviște	25–22	25–19	25–16			75–57	Report
5 Dec	17:00	CS Știința Bacău (Romania)	3–0	(Serbia) Železničar Lajkovac	25–19	25–21	25–16			75–56	Report
5 Dec	20:30	Asterix Avo Beveren (Belgium)	3–0	(Finland) LP Salo	27–25	25–18	25–20			77–63	Report
5 Dec	20:00	Sm'Aesch Pfeffingen (Switzerland)	3–0	(Belgium) VC Oudegem	25–16	25–14	25–21			75–51	Report
Golden set		Sm'Aesch Pfeffingen (Switzerland)	15–9	(Belgium) VC Oudegem							
5 Dec	18:00	Békéscsabai RSE (Hungary)	3–0	(Ukraine) VC Khimik Yuzhny	30–28	25–15	25–16			80–59	Report
Golden set		Békéscsabai RSE (Hungary)	15–9	(Ukraine) VC Khimik Yuzhny							
5 Dec	20:00	Saint-Raphaël Var Volley-Ball (France)	3–0	(Norway) Førde VBK	25–20	25–18	25–12			75–50	Report
5 Dec	19:00	Dresdner SC (Germany)	0–3	(Italy) Unet E-Work Busto Arsizio	24–26	17–25	20–25			61–76	Report
6 Dec	19:00	UVC Holding Graz (Austria)	3–1	(Czech Republic) TJ Ostrava	25–23	20–25	25–17	25–23		95–88	Report
5 Dec	19:00	Fatum-Nyíregyháza (Hungary)	3–0	(Switzerland) TS Volley Düdingen	25–18	25–17	25–14			75–49	Report

=== 8th Finals ===
Team 1	Agg.	Team 2	1st leg	2nd leg
CSM Volei Alba Blaj (Romania)	6–0	(Czech Republic) VK Prostejov	3–0	3–0
Yenisey Krasnoyarsk (Russia)	2–4	(Turkey) Galatasaray Daikin Istanbul	3–2	1–3
CS Știința Bacău (Romania)	5–1	(Netherlands) Sliedrecht Sport	3–2	3–0
Asterix Avo Beveren (Belgium)	0–6	(Czech Republic) UP Olomouc	1–3	1–3
Sm'Aesch Pfeffingen (Switzerland)	1–5	(Hungary) Békéscsabai RSE	2–3	1–3
ŽOK Bimal-Jedinstvo Brčko (Bosnia and Herzegovina)	0–6	(France) Saint-Raphaël Var Volley-Ball	1–3	0–3
UVC Holding Graz (Austria)	0–6	(Italy) Unet E-Work Busto Arsizio	0–3	1–3
ASPTT Mulhouse (France)	6–0	(Hungary) Fatum-Nyíregyháza	3–1	3–0

==== First leg ====
Date	Time		Score		Set 1	Set 2	Set 3	Set 4	Set 5	Total	Report
19 Dec	18:00	CSM Volei Alba Blaj (Romania)	3–0	(Czech Republic) VK Prostejov	25–16	25–12	25–16			75–44	Report
19 Dec	19:00	Yenisey Krasnoyarsk (Russia)	3–2	(Turkey) Galatasaray Daikin Istanbul	20–25	25–22	19–25	25–23	15–11	104–106	Report
19 Dec	17:00	CS Știința Bacău (Romania)	3–2	(Netherlands) Sliedrecht Sport	25–21	17–25	25–14	17–25	16–14	100–99	Report
19 Dec	20:00	Asterix Avo Beveren (Belgium)	1–3	(Czech Republic) UP Olomouc	26–28	25–16	17–25	15–25		83–94	Report
20 Dec	18:00	Sm'Aesch Pfeffingen (Switzerland)	2–3	(Hungary) Békéscsabai RSE	14–25	25–19	25–22	21–25	9–15	94–106	Report
18 Dec	19:00	ŽOK Bimal-Jedinstvo Brčko (Bosnia and Herzegovina)	1–3	(France) Saint-Raphaël Var VB	25–21	14–25	17–25	12–25		68–96	Report
19 Dec	19:00	UVC Holding Graz (Austria)	0–3	(Italy) Unet E-Work Busto Arsizio	11–25	21–25	14–25			46–75	Report
18 Dec	20:00	ASPTT Mulhouse (France)	3–1	(Hungary) Fatum-Nyíregyháza	25–19	25–20	21–25	25–19		96–83	Report

==== Second leg ====
Date	Time		Score		Set 1	Set 2	Set 3	Set 4	Set 5	Total	Report
22 Jan	18:00	VK Prostejov (Czech Republic)	0–3	(Romania) CSM Volei Alba Blaj	25–27	19–25	18–25			62–77	Report
22 Jan	19:00	Galatasaray Daikin Istanbul (Turkey)	3–1	(Russia) Yenisey Krasnoyarsk	25–18	24–26	25–15	25–15		99–74	Report
22 Jan	19:30	Sliedrecht Sport (Netherlands)	0–3	(Romania) CS Știința Bacău	20–25	21–25	22–25			63–75	Report
24 Jan	19:00	UP Olomouc (Czech Republic)	3–1	(Belgium) Asterix Avo Beveren	25–21	17–25	23–15	25–15		90–76	Report
24 Jan	18:00	Békéscsabai RSE (Hungary)	3–1	(Switzerland) Sm'Aesch Pfeffingen	25–18	15–25	25–17	25–17		90–77	Report
23 Jan	20:00	Saint-Raphaël Var VB (France)	3–0	(Bosnia and Herzegovina) ŽOK Bimal-Jedinstvo Brčko	27–25	25–23	25–18			77–66	Report
24 Jan	20:30	Unet E-Work Busto Arsizio (Italy)	3–1	(Austria) UVC Holding Graz	25–15	25–12	23–25	25–22		98–74	Report
23 Jan	18:00	Fatum-Nyíregyháza (Hungary)	0–3	(France) ASPTT Mulhouse	19–25	20–25	23–25			62–75	Report

=== 4th Finals ===
Team 1	Agg.	Team 2	1st leg	2nd leg	Golden Set
Galatasaray Daikin Istanbul (Turkey)	3–3	(Romania) CSM Volei Alba Blaj	3–0	0–3	5–15
CS Știința Bacău (Romania)	4–2	(Czech Republic) UP Olomouc	3–2	3–2	
Békéscsabai RSE (Hungary)	5–1	(France) Saint-Raphaël Var VB	3–2	3–0	
Unet E-Work Busto Arsizio (Italy)	5–1	(France) ASPTT Mulhouse	3–0	3–2	

==== First leg ====
Date	Time		Score		Set 1	Set 2	Set 3	Set 4	Set 5	Total	Report
6 Feb	19:00	Galatasaray Daikin Istanbul (Turkey)	3–0	(Romania) CSM Volei Alba Blaj	25–23	25–20	25–17			75–60	Report
5 Feb	17:00	CS Știința Bacău (Romania)	3–2	(Czech Republic) UP Olomouc	25–19	20–25	25–21	24–26	15–8	109–99	Report
7 Feb	17:45	Békéscsabai RSE (Hungary)	3–2	(France) Saint-Raphaël Var VB	25–23	18–25	24–26	26–24	15–10	108–108	Report
6 Feb	20:30	Unet E-Work Busto Arsizio (Italy)	3–0	(France) ASPTT Mulhouse	25–22	25–23	25–17			75–62	Report

==== Second leg ====
Date	Time		Score		Set 1	Set 2	Set 3	Set 4	Set 5	Total	Report
12 Feb	17:00	CSM Volei Alba Blaj (Romania)	3–0	(Turkey) Galatasaray Daikin Istanbul	25–20	25–23	25–16			75–59	Report
Golden set		CSM Volei Alba Blaj (Romania)	15–5	(Turkey) Galatasaray Daikin Istanbul							
12 Feb	18:15	UP Olomouc (Czech Republic)	2–3	(Romania) CS Știința Bacău	25–21	25–20	20–25	20–25	16–18	106–109	Report
13 Feb	20:00	Saint-Raphaël Var VB (France)	0–3	(Hungary) Békéscsabai RSE	23–25	23–25	16–25			62–75	Report
14 Feb	19:30	ASPTT Mulhouse (France)	2–3	(Italy) Unet E-Work Busto Arsizio	13–25	14–25	25–23	25–20	13–15	90–108	Report

== Final phase ==
=== Semifinals ===
Team 1	Agg.	Team 2	1st leg	2nd leg
CS Știința Bacău (Romania)	0–6	(Romania) CSM Volei Alba Blaj	0–3	0–3
Békéscsabai RSE (Hungary)	0–6	(Italy) Unet E-Work Busto Arsizio	0–3	0–3

==== First leg ====
Date	Time		Score		Set 1	Set 2	Set 3	Set 4	Set 5	Total	Report
26 Feb	17:00	CS Știința Bacău (Romania)	0–3	(Romania) CSM Volei Alba Blaj	12–25	16–25	16–25			44–75	Report
26 Feb	18:00	Békéscsabai RSE (Hungary)	0–3	(Italy) Unet E-Work Busto Arsizio	23–25	14–25	18–25			55–75	Report

==== Second leg ====
Date	Time		Score		Set 1	Set 2	Set 3	Set 4	Set 5	Total	Report
5 Mar	17:00	CSM Volei Alba Blaj (Romania)	3–0	(Romania) CS Știința Bacău	25–14	25–19	25–23			75–56	Report
5 Mar	20:30	Unet E-Work Busto Arsizio (Italy)	3–0	(Hungary) Békéscsabai RSE	25–22	25–18	25–11			75–51	Report

=== Finals ===
Team 1	Agg.	Team 2	1st leg	2nd leg
CSM Volei Alba Blaj (Romania)	0–6	(Italy) Unet E-Work Busto Arsizio	0–3	1–3

==== First leg ====
Date	Time		Score		Set 1	Set 2	Set 3	Set 4	Set 5	Total	Report
19 Mar	17:00	CSM Volei Alba Blaj (Romania)	0–3	(Italy) Unet E-Work Busto Arsizio	19–25	16–25	14–25			49–75	Report

==== Second leg ====
Date	Time		Score		Set 1	Set 2	Set 3	Set 4	Set 5	Total	Report
26 Mar	20:30	Unet E-Work Busto Arsizio (Italy)	3–1	(Romania) CSM Volei Alba Blaj	25–27	25–19	25–23	25–20		100–89	Report
