= 2020–21 Women's CEV Cup =

- League: Women's CEV Cup
- Sport: Volleyball
- Duration: 10 November 2020 – 23 March 2021
- Teams: 27
- Finals champions: (Italy) Saugella Monza
- Runners-up: (Turkey) Galatasaray HDI Istanbul
- Finals MVP: (Italy) Alessia Orro

Women's CEV Cup seasons
- ← 2019–20 2021–22 →

The 2020–21 Women's CEV Cup was the 49th edition of the European CEV Cup volleyball club tournament, the former "Top Teams Cup".

== Format ==
The tournament is played on a knockout format, with 27 teams participating. Initially 20 teams were allocated direct vacancies to enter the competition, with another 7 teams joining the competition via Champions League qualification. On 29 June 2018, a drawing of lots in Luxembourg City, Luxembourg, determined the team's pairing for each match. Each team plays a home and an away match with result points awarded for each leg (3 points for 3–0 or 3–1 wins, 2 points for 3–2 win, 1 point for 2–3 loss). After two legs, the team with the most result points advances to the next round. In case the teams are tied after two legs, a Golden Set is played immediately at the completion of the second leg. The Golden Set winner is the team that first obtains 15 points, provided that the points difference between the two teams is at least 2 points (thus, the Golden Set is similar to a tiebreak set in a normal match).

== Participating teams ==
- Drawing of lots for the 27 participating team was held in Luxembourg City, Luxembourg on 29 June 2018.
- 20 teams allocated vacancies spots and 7 teams qualified as Champions League qualification losers.

The number of participants on the basis of ranking list for European Cup Competitions:

== Final phase ==
=== Semifinals ===
Team 1	Agg.	Team 2	1st leg	2nd leg
Saugella Monza (Italy)	6–0	(Serbia) TENT Obrenovac	3–0	3–0
Béziers Volley (France)	3–5	(Turkey) Galatasaray HDI Istanbul	3–2	0–3

==== First leg ====
Date	Time		Score		Set 1	Set 2	Set 3	Set 4	Set 5	Total	Report
24 Feb	18:00	Saugella Monza (Italy)	3–0	(Serbia) TENT Obrenovac	25–15	25–22	25–12			75–49	Report
23 Feb	18:00	Béziers Volley (France)	3–2	(Turkey) Galatasaray HDI Istanbul	25–20	13–25	18–25	25–22	15–13	96–105	Report

==== Second leg ====
Date	Time		Score		Set 1	Set 2	Set 3	Set 4	Set 5	Total	Report
2 Mar	18:30	TENT Obrenovac (Serbia)	0–3	(Italy) Saugella Monza	24–26	20–25	23–25			67–76	Report
3 Mar	20:00	Galatasaray HDI Istanbul (Turkey)	3–0	(France) Béziers Volley	25–23	25–9	25–21			75–53	Report

=== Finals ===
Team 1	Agg.	Team 2	1st leg	2nd leg
Saugella Monza (Italy)	6–0	(Turkey) Galatasaray HDI Istanbul	3–0	3–0

==== First leg ====
Date	Time		Score		Set 1	Set 2	Set 3	Set 4	Set 5	Total	Report
16 Mar	18:00	Saugella Monza (Italy)	3–0	(Turkey) Galatasaray HDI Istanbul	25–23	25–15	25–16			75–54	Report

==== Second leg ====
Date	Time		Score		Set 1	Set 2	Set 3	Set 4	Set 5	Total	Report
23 Mar	20:00	Galatasaray HDI Istanbul (Turkey)	0–3	(Italy) Saugella Monza	17–25	19–25	19-25			55–50	Report
