= 2021–22 Women's CEV Cup =

- League: Women's CEV Cup
- Sport: Volleyball
- Duration: 16 November 2021 – 22 March 2022
- Teams: 31
- Finals champions: (Turkey) Eczacıbaşı Dynavit Istanbul
- Runners-up: (Germany) Allianz MTV Stuttgart
- Finals MVP: (Serbia) Maja Ognjenović

Women's CEV Cup seasons
- ← 2020–21 2022–23

The 2021–22 Women's CEV Cup was the 50th edition of the European CEV Cup volleyball club tournament, the former "Top Teams Cup".

== Format ==
The tournament is played on a knockout format, with 31 teams participating. Initially 23 teams were allocated direct vacancies to enter the competition, with another 8 teams joining the competition via Champions League qualification. On 21 June 2021, a drawing of lots in Luxembourg City, Luxembourg, determined the team's pairing for each match. Each team plays a home and an away match with result points awarded for each leg (3 points for 3–0 or 3–1 wins, 2 points for 3–2 win, 1 point for 2–3 loss). After two legs, the team with the most result points advances to the next round. In case the teams are tied after two legs, a Golden Set is played immediately at the completion of the second leg. The Golden Set winner is the team that first obtains 15 points, provided that the points difference between the two teams is at least 2 points (thus, the Golden Set is similar to a tiebreak set in a normal match).

== Participating teams ==
- Drawing of lots for the 31 participating teams was held in Luxembourg City, Luxembourg on 25 June 2021.

The number of participants on the basis of ranking list for European Cup Competitions:

Rank	Country	Number of teams	Teams
1	France	2	Nantes VB, Voléro Le Cannet
2	Turkey	1	Eczacıbaşı Dynavit Istanbul
3	Czech Republic	2	PVK Olymp Praha, VK UP Olomouc
4	Switzerland	2	Vitéos Neuchâtel UC, TS Volley Düdingen
5	Hungary	2	Békéscsabai RSE, Vasas Óbuda Budapest
6	Romania	1	CSM Alba Blaj
7	Belgium	3	Asterix Avo Beveren, VC Oudegem, VDK Bank Gent Dames
8	Germany	2	Allianz MTV Stuttgart, SSC Palmberg Schwerin
9	Italy	1	Unet E-Work Busto Arsizio
10	Russia	2	Proton Saratov, Uralochka NTMK Ekaterinburg
11	Greece	3	Olympiacos Piraeus, PAOK, AO Thiras
12	Slovenia	2	Calcit Kamnik, Nova KBM Branik Maribor
14	Bosnia and Herzegovina	2	ZOK Bimal-Jedinstvo Brčko, UOK Banjaluka Volley
15	Belarus	1	Minchanka Minsk
18	Croatia	1	Mladost Zagreb
19	Poland	1	ŁKS Commercecon Łódź
20	Spain	1	CV Gran Canaria
25	Serbia	1	Železničar Lajkovac
26	Portugal	1	AJM/FC Porto

== Main phase ==
Round of 32
(Greece) PAOK	3	3
(Belgium) Beveren	0	2
(Hungary) Vasas	1	0
(Romania) Alba Blaj	3	3
(France) Le Cannet	3	3
(Belarus) Minsk	2	1
(Czech Republic) Olomouc	3	3
(Bosnia and Herzegovina) Brčko	1	0
(Russia) Saratov	1	2
(Russia) Uralochka	3	3
(Greece) Thira	3	0
(Belgium) Oudegem	0	3
(Slovenia) Kamnik	3	3
(Switzerland) Neuchâtel	2	1
(Serbia) Lajkovac	0	0
(Turkey) Eczacıbaşı	3	3
(Slovenia) Branik	1	3
(Spain) Gran Canaria	0	0
(Poland) ŁKS Łódź	3	3
(Hungary) Békéscsabai	1	1
(Bosnia and Herzegovina) Banjaluka	0	0
(Croatia) Zagreb	3	3
(Switzerland) Düdingen	3	3
(Czech Republic) Praha	0	1
(Belgium) Gent	1	0
(Italy) Busto Arsizio	3	3
(Germany) Stuttgart
bye
(Portugal) AJM/FC Porto	3	2
(Greece) Olympiacos	0	3
(Germany) Schwerin	3	3
(France) Nantes	1	2

Round of 16
(Greece) PAOK	1	0
(Romania) Alba Blaj	3	3
(France) Le Cannet	3	3
(Czech Republic) Olomouc	0	0
(Russia) Uralochka	3	3
(Belgium) Oudegem	0	0
(Slovenia) Kamnik	0	0
(Turkey) Eczacıbaşı	3	3
(Spain) Gran Canaria	0	0
(Poland) ŁKS Łódź	3	3
(Croatia) Zagreb	3	3
(Switzerland) Düdingen	0	0
(Italy) Busto Arsizio	3	1
(Germany) Stuttgart	0	3
(Portugal) AJM/FC Porto	0	1
(Germany) Schwerin	3	3

Quarterfinals
(Romania) Alba Blaj	3	3
(France) Le Cannet	0	2
(Russia) Uralochka	0	3
(Turkey) Eczacıbaşı	3	2
(Poland) ŁKS Łódź	2	3
(Croatia) Zagreb	3	2
(Germany) Stuttgart	3	3
(Germany) Schwerin	1	0

Semifinals
(Romania) Alba Blaj	0	0
(Turkey) Eczacıbaşı	3	3
(Croatia) Zagreb	1	0
(Germany) Stuttgart	3	3

Finals
(Turkey) Eczacıbaşı	3	3
(Germany) Stuttgart	1	1

=== Round of 32 ===
Team 1	Agg.	Team 2	1st leg	2nd leg
Asterix Avo Beveren (Belgium)	1–5	(Greece) PAOK	0–3	2–3
Vasas Óbuda Budapest (Hungary)	0–6	(Romania) CSM Alba Blaj	1–3	0–3
Minchanka Minsk (Belarus)	1–5	(France) Voléro Le Cannet	2–3	1–3
ZOK Bimal-Jedinstvo Brčko (Bosnia and Herzegovina)	0–6	(Czech Republic) VK UP Olomouc	1–3	0–3
Proton Saratov (Russia)	1–5	(Russia) Uralochka NTMK Ekaterinburg	1–3	2–3
AO Thiras (Greece)	3–3	(Belgium) VC Oudegem	3–0	0–3
Calcit Kamnik (Slovenia)	5–1	(Switzerland) Vitéos Neuchâtel UC	3–2	3–1
Železničar Lajkovac (Serbia)	0–6	(Turkey) Eczacıbaşı Dynavit Istanbul	0–3	0–3
CV Gran Canaria (Spain)	4–2	(Slovenia) Nova KBM Branik Maribor	3–1	2–3
ŁKS Commercecon Łódź (Poland)	6–0	(Hungary) Békéscsabai RSE	3–1	3–1
Mladost Zagreb (Croatia)	6–0	(Bosnia and Herzegovina) UOK Banjaluka Volley	3–0	3–0
PVK Olymp Praha (Czech Republic)	0–6	(Switzerland) TS Volley Düdingen	0–3	1–3
VDK Bank Gent Dames (Belgium)	0–6	(Italy) Unet E-Work Busto Arsizio	1–3	0–3
bye		(Germany) Allianz MTV Stuttgart		
AJM/FC Porto (Portugal)	4–2	(Greece) Olympiacos Piraeus	3–0	2–3
SSC Palmberg Schwerin (Germany)	5–1	(France) Nantes VB	3–1	3–2

==== First leg ====
Date	Time		Score		Set 1	Set 2	Set 3	Set 4	Set 5	Total	Report
17 Nov	19:30	Asterix Avo Beveren (Belgium)	0–3	(Greece) PAOK	22–25	15–25	19–25			56–75	Report
17 Nov	18:00	Vasas Óbuda Budapest (Hungary)	1–3	(Romania) CSM Alba Blaj	15–25	23–25	25–17	19–25		82–92	Report
16 Nov	18:00	Minchanka Minsk (Belarus)	2–3	(France) Voléro Le Cannet	21–25	17–25	25–16	25–21	10–15	98–102	Report
16 Nov	19:00	ZOK Bimal-Jedinstvo Brčko (Bosnia and Herzegovina)	1–3	(Czech Republic) VK UP Olomouc	23–25	23–25	25–18	21–25		92–93	Report
17 Nov	19:00	Proton Saratov (Russia)	1–3	(Russia) Uralochka NTMK Ekaterinburg	24–26	18–25	25–23	14–25		81–99	Report
17 Nov	19:00	AO Thiras (Greece)	3–0	(Belgium) VC Oudegem	25–23	25–20	25–16			75–59	Report
17 Nov	17:00	Calcit Kamnik (Slovenia)	3–2	(Switzerland) Vitéos Neuchâtel UC	25–20	25–27	25–22	23–25	15–10	113–104	Report
17 Nov	19:00	Železničar Lajkovac (Serbia)	0–3	(Turkey) Eczacıbaşı Dynavit Istanbul	26–28	17–25	17–25			60–78	Report
17 Nov	18:00	CV Gran Canaria (Spain)	3–1	(Slovenia) Nova KBM Branik Maribor	25–14	25–19	19–25	25–11		94–69	Report
16 Nov	18:00	ŁKS Commercecon Łódź (Poland)	3–1	(Hungary) Békéscsabai RSE	25–23	25–15	23–25	25–19		98–82	Report
16 Nov	19:30	Mladost Zagreb (Croatia)	3–0	(Bosnia and Herzegovina) UOK Banjaluka Volley	25–21	25–17	25–12			75–50	Report
17 Nov	16:00	PVK Olymp Praha (Czech Republic)	0–3	(Switzerland) TS Volley Düdingen	24–26	14–25	16–25			54–76	Report
17 Nov	20:00	VDK Bank Gent Dames (Belgium)	1–3	(Italy) Unet E-Work Busto Arsizio	18–25	22–25	25–21	19–25		84–96	Report
		bye		(Germany) Allianz MTV Stuttgart							Report
16 Nov	17:00	AJM/FC Porto (Portugal)	3–0	(Greece) Olympiacos Piraeus	25–21	25–18	25–17			75–56	Report
17 Nov	19:00	SSC Palmberg Schwerin (Germany)	3–1	(France) Nantes VB	25–10	22–25	27–25	25–14		99–74	Report

==== Second leg ====
Date	Time		Score		Set 1	Set 2	Set 3	Set 4	Set 5	Total	Report
24 Nov	18:00	PAOK (Greece)	3–2	(Belgium) Asterix Avo Beveren	16–25	14–25	25–16	25–18	16–14	96–98	Report
24 Nov	18:00	CSM Alba Blaj (Romania)	3–0	(Hungary) Vasas Óbuda Budapest	25–19	25–18	25–21			75–58	Report
25 Nov	20:00	Voléro Le Cannet (France)	3–1	(Belarus) Minchanka Minsk	28–26	26–28	25–17	28–26		107–97	Report
24 Nov	17:00	VK UP Olomouc (Czech Republic)	3–0	(Bosnia and Herzegovina) ZOK Bimal-Jedinstvo Brčko	25–20	25–19	25–18			75–57	Report
23 Nov	18:00	Uralochka NTMK Ekaterinburg (Russia)	3–2	(Russia) Proton Saratov	25–22	25–19	22–25	22–25	15–10	109–101	Report
25 Nov	20:00	VC Oudegem (Belgium)	3–0	(Greece) AO Thiras	25–0	25–0	25–0			75–0	Report
25 Nov	20:00	Vitéos Neuchâtel UC (Switzerland)	1–3	(Slovenia) Calcit Kamnik	17–25	25–21	21–25	21–25		84–96	Report
24 Nov	18:00	Eczacıbaşı Dynavit Istanbul (Turkey)	3–0	(Serbia) Železničar Lajkovac	25–16	25–21	25–13			75–50	Report
24 Nov	18:00	Nova KBM Branik Maribor (Slovenia)	3–2	(Spain) CV Gran Canaria	25–21	17–25	25–27	25–15	22–20	114–108	Report
24 Nov	18:00	Békéscsabai RSE (Hungary)	1–3	(Poland) ŁKS Commercecon Łódź	25–16	23–25	18–25	25–27		91–93	Report
24 Nov	20:15	UOK Banjaluka Volley (Bosnia and Herzegovina)	0–3	(Croatia) Mladost Zagreb	16–25	11–25	18–25			45–75	Report
23 Nov	20:00	TS Volley Düdingen (Switzerland)	3–1	(Czech Republic) PVK Olymp Praha	25–23	23–25	25–19	25–21		98–88	Report
24 Nov	20:30	Unet E-Work Busto Arsizio (Italy)	3–0	(Belgium) VDK Bank Gent Dames	25–16	25–14	25–17			75–47	Report
		Allianz MTV Stuttgart (Germany)		bye							Report
24 Nov	19:00	Olympiacos Piraeus (Greece)	3–2	(Portugal) AJM/FC Porto	25–14	22–25	25–19	22–25	21–19	115–102	Report
23 Nov	19:30	Nantes VB (France)	2–3	(Germany) SSC Palmberg Schwerin	14–25	22–25	25–23	26–24	13–15	100–112	Report

=== Round of 16 ===
Team 1	Agg.	Team 2	1st leg	2nd leg	Golden Set
PAOK (Greece)	0–6	(Romania) CSM Alba Blaj	1–3	0–3	
Voléro Le Cannet (France)	6–0	(Czech Republic) VK UP Olomouc	3–0	3–0	
Uralochka NTMK Ekaterinburg (Russia)	6–0	(Belgium) VC Oudegem	3–0	3–0	
Calcit Kamnik (Slovenia)	0–6	(Turkey) Eczacıbaşı Dynavit Istanbul	0–3	0–3	
CV Gran Canaria (Spain)	0–6	(Poland) ŁKS Commercecon Łódź	0–3	0–3	
Mladost Zagreb (Croatia)	6–0	(Switzerland) TS Volley Düdingen	3–0	3–0	
Unet E-Work Busto Arsizio (Italy)	3–3	(Germany) Allianz MTV Stuttgart	3–0	1–3	14–16
AJM/FC Porto (Portugal)	0–6	(Germany) SSC Palmberg Schwerin	0–3	1–3	

==== First leg ====
Date	Time		Score		Set 1	Set 2	Set 3	Set 4	Set 5	Total	Report
8 Dec	19:00	PAOK (Greece)	1–3	(Romania) CSM Alba Blaj	22–25	25–22	18–25	24–26		89–98	Report
7 Dec	20:00	Voléro Le Cannet (France)	3–0	(Czech Republic) VK UP Olomouc	25–20	30–28	25–20			80–68	Report
14 Dec	18:00	Uralochka NTMK Ekaterinburg (Russia)	3–0	(Belgium) VC Oudegem	25–16	25–15	25–16			75–47	Report
8 Dec	20:00	Calcit Kamnik (Slovenia)	0–3	(Turkey) Eczacıbaşı Dynavit Istanbul	23–25	17–25	15–25			55–75	Report
14 Dec	18:00	CV Gran Canaria (Spain)	0–3	(Poland) ŁKS Commercecon Łódź	14–25	19–25	16–25			49–75	Report
7 Dec	19:00	Mladost Zagreb (Croatia)	3–0	(Switzerland) TS Volley Düdingen	25–0	25–0	25–0			75–0	Report
8 Dec	20:30	Unet E-Work Busto Arsizio (Italy)	3–0	(Germany) Allianz MTV Stuttgart	29–27	25–19	25–23			79–69	Report
7 Dec	12:00	AJM/FC Porto (Portugal)	0–3	(Germany) SSC Palmberg Schwerin	19–25	12–25	24–26			55–76	Report

==== Second leg ====
Date	Time		Score		Set 1	Set 2	Set 3	Set 4	Set 5	Total	Report
14 Dec	19:00	CSM Alba Blaj (Romania)	3–0	(Greece) PAOK	25–11	25–20	25–19			75–50	Report
15 Dec	18:00	VK UP Olomouc (Czech Republic)	0–3	(France) Voléro Le Cannet	21–25	20–25	18–25			59–75	Report
15 Dec	18:00	VC Oudegem (Belgium)	0–3	(Russia) Uralochka NTMK Ekaterinburg	20–25	10–25	20–25			50–75	Report
16 Dec	18:00	Eczacıbaşı Dynavit Istanbul (Turkey)	3-0	(Slovenia) Calcit Kamnik	25–19	25–17	25–23			75–59	Report
15 Dec	18:00	ŁKS Commercecon Łódź (Poland)	3–0	(Spain) CV Gran Canaria	25–23	25–17	25–23			75–63	Report
14 Dec	20:00	TS Volley Düdingen (Switzerland)	0–3	(Croatia) Mladost Zagreb	0–25	0–25	0–25			0–75	Report
15 Dec	19:00	Allianz MTV Stuttgart (Germany)	3–1	(Italy) Unet E-Work Busto Arsizio	25–19	25–18	21–25	25–19		96–81	Report
Golden set		Allianz MTV Stuttgart (Germany)	16–14	(Italy) Unet E-Work Busto Arsizio							
14 Dec	19:00	SSC Palmberg Schwerin (Germany)	3–1	(Portugal) AJM/FC Porto	26–24	23–25	25–16	25–19		99–84	Report

=== Quarterfinals ===
Team 1	Agg.	Team 2	1st leg	2nd leg	Golden Set
CSM Alba Blaj (Romania)	5–1	(France) Volero Le Cannet	3–0	3–2	
Uralochka NTMK Ekaterinburg (Russia)	2–4	(Turkey) Eczacıbaşı Dynavit Istanbul	0–3	3–2	
ŁKS Commercecon Łódź (Poland)	3–3	(Croatia) Mladost Zagreb	2–3	3–2	11–15
Allianz MTV Stuttgart (Germany)	6–0	(Germany) SSC Palmberg Schwerin	3–1	3–0	

==== First leg ====
Date	Time		Score		Set 1	Set 2	Set 3	Set 4	Set 5	Total	Report
25 Jan	19:00	CSM Alba Blaj (Romania)	3–0	(France) Volero Le Cannet	25–19	25–13	25–15			75–47	Report
25 Jan	18:00	Uralochka NTMK Ekaterinburg (Russia)	0–3	(Turkey) Eczacıbaşı Dynavit Istanbul	19–25	19–25	21–25			59–75	Report
26 Jan	18:00	ŁKS Commercecon Łódź (Poland)	2–3	(Croatia) Mladost Zagreb	29–31	21–25	25–14	25–17	8–15	108–102	Report
9 Feb	19:00	Allianz MTV Stuttgart (Germany)	3–1	(Germany) SSC Palmberg Schwerin	25–19	25–12	21–25	25–21		96–77	Report

==== Second leg ====
Date	Time		Score		Set 1	Set 2	Set 3	Set 4	Set 5	Total	Report
15 Feb	20:00	Volero Le Cannet (France)	2–3	(Romania) CSM Alba Blaj	25–27	16–25	25–22	25–17	12–15	103–106	Report
26 Jan	18:00	Eczacıbaşı Dynavit Istanbul (Turkey)	2–3	(Russia) Uralochka NTMK Ekaterinburg	25–17	24–26	31–29	19–25	6–15	105–112	Report
1 Feb	17:00	Mladost Zagreb (Croatia)	2–3	(Poland) ŁKS Commercecon Łódź	29–27	21–25	14–25	25–20	9–15	98–112	Report
Golden set		Mladost Zagreb (Croatia)	15–11	(Poland) ŁKS Commercecon Łódź							
3 Feb	19:00	SSC Palmberg Schwerin (Germany)	0–3	(Germany) Allianz MTV Stuttgart	0–25	0–25	0–25			0–75	Report

=== Semifinals ===
Team 1	Agg.	Team 2	1st leg	2nd leg
CSM Alba Blaj (Romania)	0–6	(Turkey) Eczacıbaşı Dynavit Istanbul	0–3	0–3
Mladost Zagreb (Croatia)	0–6	(Germany) Allianz MTV Stuttgart	1–3	0–3

==== First leg ====
Date	Time		Score		Set 1	Set 2	Set 3	Set 4	Set 5	Total	Report
23 Feb	19:00	CSM Alba Blaj (Romania)	0–3	(Turkey) Eczacıbaşı Dynavit Istanbul	21–25	22–25	19–25			62–75	Report
23 Feb	19:30	Mladost Zagreb (Croatia)	1–3	(Germany) Allianz MTV Stuttgart	18–25	25–21	15–25	22–25		80–96	Report

==== Second leg ====
Date	Time		Score		Set 1	Set 2	Set 3	Set 4	Set 5	Total	Report
1 Mar	18:00	Eczacıbaşı Dynavit Istanbul (Turkey)	3–0	(Romania) CSM Alba Blaj	25–15	25–18	25–19			75–52	Report
1 Mar	19:00	Allianz MTV Stuttgart (Germany)	3–0	(Croatia) Mladost Zagreb	25–16	25–13	25–10			75–39	Report

=== Finals ===
Team 1	Agg.	Team 2	1st leg	2nd leg
Eczacıbaşı Dynavit Istanbul (Turkey)	6–0	(Germany) Allianz MTV Stuttgart	3–1	3–1

==== First leg ====
Date	Time		Score		Set 1	Set 2	Set 3	Set 4	Set 5	Total	Report
15 Mar	19:00	Eczacıbaşı Dynavit Istanbul (Turkey)	3–1	(Germany) Allianz MTV Stuttgart	25–19	22–25	25–20	25–17		97–81	Report

==== Second leg ====
Date	Time		Score		Set 1	Set 2	Set 3	Set 4	Set 5	Total	Report
22 Mar	19:00	Allianz MTV Stuttgart (Germany)	1–3	(Turkey) Eczacıbaşı Dynavit Istanbul	18–25	21–25	25–18	24–26		88–94	Report
