= Britt Herbots =

Belgian volleyball player

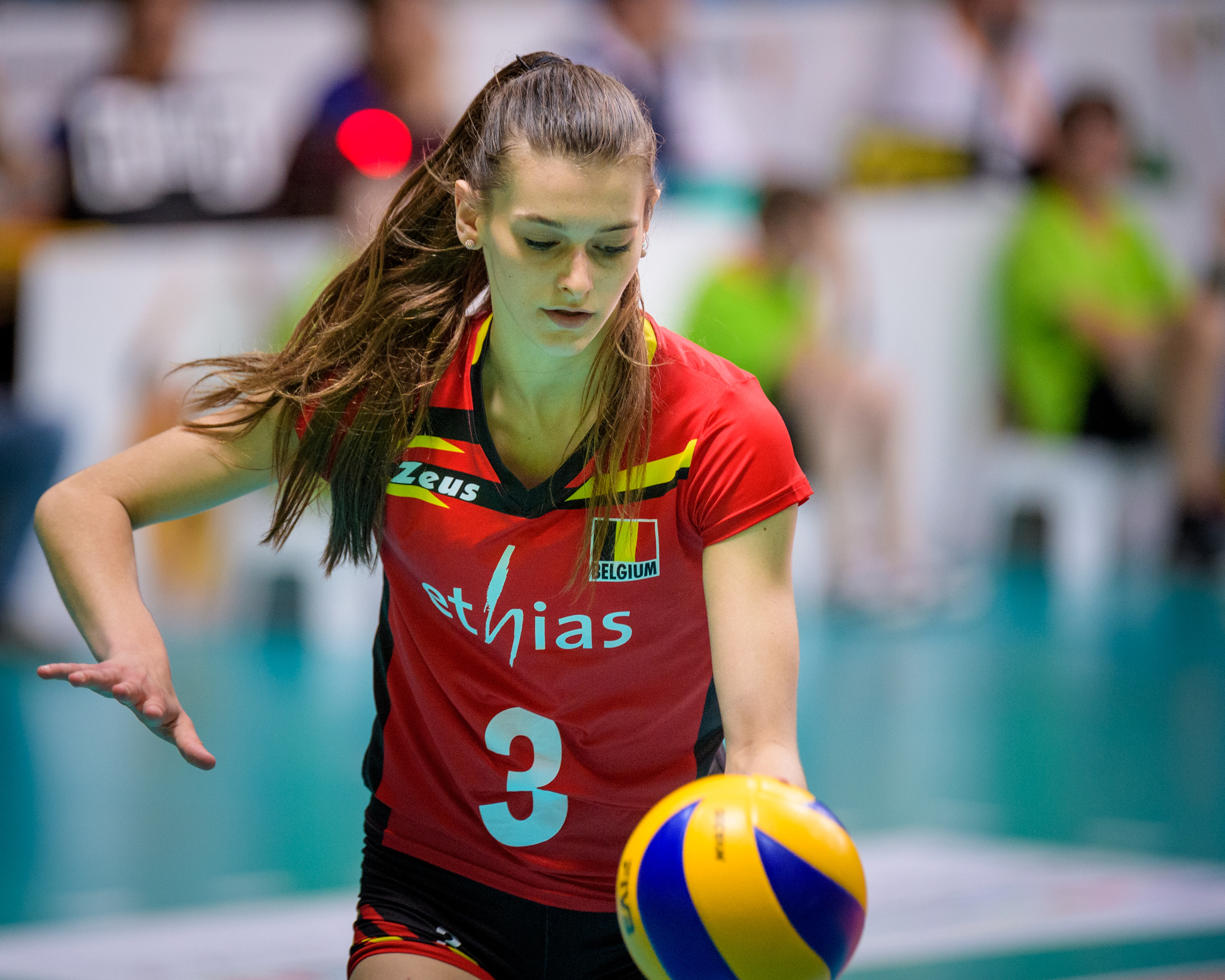
- Herbots in 2016

Personal information
- Nationality: Belgium
- Born: 24 September 1999 (age 27) Sint-Truiden, Belgium
- Home town: Sint-Truiden, Belgium
- Height: 182 cm (6 ft 0 in)
- Weight: 62 kg (137 lb)
- Spike: 310 cm (122 in)
- Block: 283 cm (111 in)

Volleyball information
- Position: Outside hitter
- Current club: (Italy) Novara

Career
- Years: Team
- 2014–2015: (Belgium) Topsportschool Vilvoorde
- 2015–2017: (Belgium) Asterix Avo
- 2017–2018: (France) ASPTT Mulhouse
- 2018–2020: (Italy) Busto
- 2020–2022: (Italy) Novara
- 2022-2023: (Italy) Firenze
- 2023-2025: (Italy) Scandicci
- 2025–: (Italy) Novara

National team
- Years: Team
- 2015–: Belgium
Medal record
Women's volleyball
Representing Belgium
FIVB Challenger Cup
Silver medal – second place	2022 Zadar
Girls' Youth European Volleyball Championship
Bronze medal – third place	2015 Plovdiv	Team

Britt Herbots (born 24 September 1999) is a Belgian volleyball player. She plays for the Belgium women's volleyball team. Professionally, she plays for Italian Series A1 club [Savino del Bene Scandicci].

== Personal life ==
Herbots grew up in Sint-Truiden, Belgium. Her mother and father both coached volleyball.

== International career ==
=== Clubs ===
- 2014–2015 – (Belgium) Topsportschool Vilvoorde
- 2015–2017 – (Belgium) Asterix Avo
- 2017–2018 – (France) ASPTT Mulhouse
- 2018–2020 – (Italy) Busto
- 2020–2022 – (Italy) Novara
- 2022–2023 – (Italy) Firenze
- 2023–2025 – (Italy) Scandicci
- 2025–Present - (Italy) Novara

In 2015 at age 16, Herbots joined her country's top club of Asterix and within two seasons she won two Belgian Championship titles and two Cups, as well as a Supercup. After playing in France for one season, she began her career in Italy's top league when she signed with Busto. She named CEV Cup MVP.

=== National team ===
Herbots played for Belgium's youth national team and officially joined the senior national team in 2016 at 17 years old.

Herbots was statistically the best scorer at the 2021 FIVB Volleyball Women's Nations League tournament. Herbots scored 30 points or more in a single VNL match during the tournament four times. Herbots is also representing Belgium in the 2022 FIVB Volleyball Women's Nations League, and notably scored 31 points in a loss to Serbia.

== Honors and awards ==
=== Club ===
- 2015–2016 Belgian Super Cup – Silver Medal, with Asterix Avo
- 2015–2016 Belgian Cup – Gold Medal, with Asterix Avo
- 2015–2016 Belgian Liga A – Champions, with Asterix Avo
- 2016–2017 Belgian Super Cup – Gold Medal, with Asterix Avo
- 2016–2017 Belgian Cup – Gold Medal, with Asterix Avo
- 2016–2017 Belgian Liga A – Champions, with Asterix Avo
- 2017–2018 French Super Cup - Gold Medal, with ASPTT Mulhouse
- 2017–2018 French League - Bronze Medal, with ASPTT Mulhouse
- 2017–2018 French Cup - Bronze Medal, with ASPTT Mulhouse
- 2018–2019 CEV Cup – Champions, with Busto
- 2018–2019 Italian Cup – Bronze Medal, with Busto
- 2018–2019 Italian Cup – Silver Medal, with Busto
- 2020–2021 Italian Super Cup – Bronze Medal, with Novara
- 2020–2021 Italian Cup – Silver Medal, with Novara
- 2020–2021 CEV Champions League – Bronze Medal, with Novara
- 2020–2021 Italian Series A1 – Silver Medal, with Novara
- 2021–2022 Italian Super Cup – Silver Medal, with Novara
- 2021–2022 Italian Cup – Silver Medal, with Novara
- 2021–2022 Italian Series A1 – Bronze Medal, with Novara

=== Individual ===
- 2015 Girls' Youth European Volleyball Championship – Best opposite
- 2015 Girls' Youth European Volleyball Championship – Best server
- 2015 European Youth Summer Olympic Festival – Most valuable player
- 2015–2016 Belgian Cup – Best scorer
- 2015–2016 Belgian Cup – Best spiker
- 2015–2016 Belgian Cup – Most valuable player
- 2015–2016 Belgian Cup – Best opposite
- 2016–2017 Belgian Cup – Most valuable player
- 2016–2017 Belgian Cup – Best scorer
- 2016–2017 Belgian Cup – Best outside hitter
- 2016–2017 Belgian Liga A – Most valuable player
- 2016–2017 Belgian Liga A – Best scorer
- 2016–2017 Belgian Liga A – Best outside hitter
- 2017–2018 French Super Cup - Most valuable player
- 2017–2018 French League - Best outside hitter
- 2017–2018 French League - Most valuable player
- 2017–2018 French Cup - Best outside hitter
- 2018–19 CEV Cup – Most valuable player
- 2018–19 CEV Cup – Best outside hitter
- 2020 European Olympic Qualification – Best server
