= 2018–19 CEV Women's Champions League qualification =

This article shows the qualification phase for 2018–19 CEV Women's Champions League. A total of 9 teams entered this qualification round. During qualification, the winners of each tie keep on progressing until the last 2 teams standing join the 18 teams which have directly qualified to the main tournament League round based on the European Cups' Ranking List. All 7 teams which do not progress in qualification are allocated to the 2018–19 Women's CEV Cup.

== Participating teams ==
Drawing of lots took place on 29 June 2018 in Luxembourg City, Luxembourg.

Rank	Country	No. teams	Team(s)	Outcome (qualified to)
4	Poland	1	Budowlani Łódź^{1}	TBD
6	France	1	ASPTT Mulhouse^{1}	TBD
8	Romania	1	CSM Volei Alba Blaj^{1}	TBD
9	Germany	1	Allianz MTV Stuttgart^{1}	TBD
11	Czech Republic	1	UP Olomouc^{1}	CEV Cup
16	Hungary	1	Békéscsabai RSE^{1}	CEV Cup
17	Bosnia and Herzegovina	1	ŽOK Bimal-Jedinstvo Brčko^{1}	CEV Cup
17	Netherlands	1	Sliedrecht Sport	CEV Cup
25	Austria	1	UVC Holding Graz	CEV Cup

1. Team entering at the 2nd round.

== First round ==
- Only 2 teams compete in the first round.
- Winner advance to the second round and loser qualify to CEV Cup.
- All times are local.

Team 1	Agg.	Team 2	1st leg	2nd leg
UVC Holding Graz (Austria)	0–6	(Netherlands) Sliedrecht Sport	0–3	0–3

=== First leg ===
Date	Time		Score		Set 1	Set 2	Set 3	Set 4	Set 5	Total	Report
10 Oct	20:25	UVC Holding Graz (Austria)	0–3	(Netherlands) Sliedrecht Sport	13–25	14–25	17–25			44–75	Report

=== Second leg ===
Date	Time		Score		Set 1	Set 2	Set 3	Set 4	Set 5	Total	Report
17 Oct	19:30	Sliedrecht Sport (Netherlands)	3–0	(Austria) UVC Holding Graz	25–12	25–9	25–14			75–35	Report

== Second round ==
- 8 teams compete in the second round.
- Winners advance to the third round and losers qualify to CEV Cup.
- All times are local.

Team 1	Agg.	Team 2	1st leg	2nd leg	Tie #
UP Olomouc (Czech Republic)	1–5	(Romania) CSM Volei Alba Blaj	2–3	0–3	1
Sliedrecht Sport (Netherlands)	0–6	(Germany) Allianz MTV Stuttgart	0–3	0–3	2
ŽOK Bimal-Jedinstvo Brčko (Bosnia and Herzegovina)	0–6	(France) ASPTT Mulhouse	1–3	0–3	3
Békéscsabai RSE (Hungary)	0–6	(Poland) Budowlani Łódź	1–3	0–3	4

=== First leg ===
Date	Time		Score		Set 1	Set 2	Set 3	Set 4	Set 5	Total	Report
23 Oct	19:00	ŽOK Bimal-Jedinstvo Brčko (Bosnia and Herzegovina)	1–3	(France) ASPTT Mulhouse	15–25	18–25	29–27	19–25		81–102	Report
24 Oct	18:00	UP Olomouc (Czech Republic)	2–3	(Romania) CSM Volei Alba Blaj	25–23	16–25	24–26	27–25	13–15	105–114	Report
24 Oct	19:30	Sliedrecht Sport (Netherlands)	0–3	(Germany) Allianz MTV Stuttgart	14–25	22–25	19–25			55–75	Report
25 Oct	17:00	Békéscsabai RSE (Hungary)	1–3	(Poland) Budowlani Łódź	25–20	22–25	23–25	18–25		88–95	Report

=== Second leg ===
Date	Time		Score		Set 1	Set 2	Set 3	Set 4	Set 5	Total	Report
30 Oct	18:00	CSM Volei Alba Blaj (Romania)	3–0	(Czech Republic) UP Olomouc	27–25	25–20	25–23			77–68	Report
31 Oct	18:00	Budowlani Łódź (Poland)	3–0	(Hungary) Békéscsabai RSE	25–23	25–20	25–17			75–60	Report
31 Oct	19:00	Allianz MTV Stuttgart (Germany)	3–0	(Netherlands) Sliedrecht Sport	25–7	25–12	25–22			75–41	Report
31 Oct	20:00	ASPTT Mulhouse (France)	3–0	(Bosnia and Herzegovina) ŽOK Bimal-Jedinstvo Brčko	25–21	25–20	25–23			75–64	Report

== Third round ==
- 4 teams compete in the third round.
- Winners advance to the League round and losers qualify to CEV Cup.

Team 1	Agg.	Team 2	1st leg	2nd leg	Golden Set
CSM Volei Alba Blaj (Romania)	3–3	(Germany) Allianz MTV Stuttgart	3–0	0–3	7–15
Budowlani Łódź (Poland)	5–1	(France) ASPTT Mulhouse	3–1	3–2	

=== First leg ===
Date	Time		Score		Set 1	Set 2	Set 3	Set 4	Set 5	Total	Report
7 Nov	18:00	CSM Volei Alba Blaj (Romania)	3–1	(Germany) Allianz MTV Stuttgart	25–18	25–20	17–25	28–26		95–89	Report
7 Nov	18:00	Budowlani Łódź (Poland)	3–1	(France) ASPTT Mulhouse	27–25	29–27	22–25	25–17		103–94	Report

=== Second leg ===
Date	Time		Score		Set 1	Set 2	Set 3	Set 4	Set 5	Total	Report
13 Nov	19:00	Allianz MTV Stuttgart (Germany)	3–0	(Romania) CSM Volei Alba Blaj	25–19	25–17	25–11			75–47	Report
Golden set		Allianz MTV Stuttgart (Germany)	15–7	(Romania) CSM Volei Alba Blaj							
13 Nov	20:00	ASPTT Mulhouse (France)	2–3	(Poland) Budowlani Łódź	25–23	23–25	25–16	18–25	11–15	102–104	Report
