= Michaela Abrhámová =

Slovak volleyball player

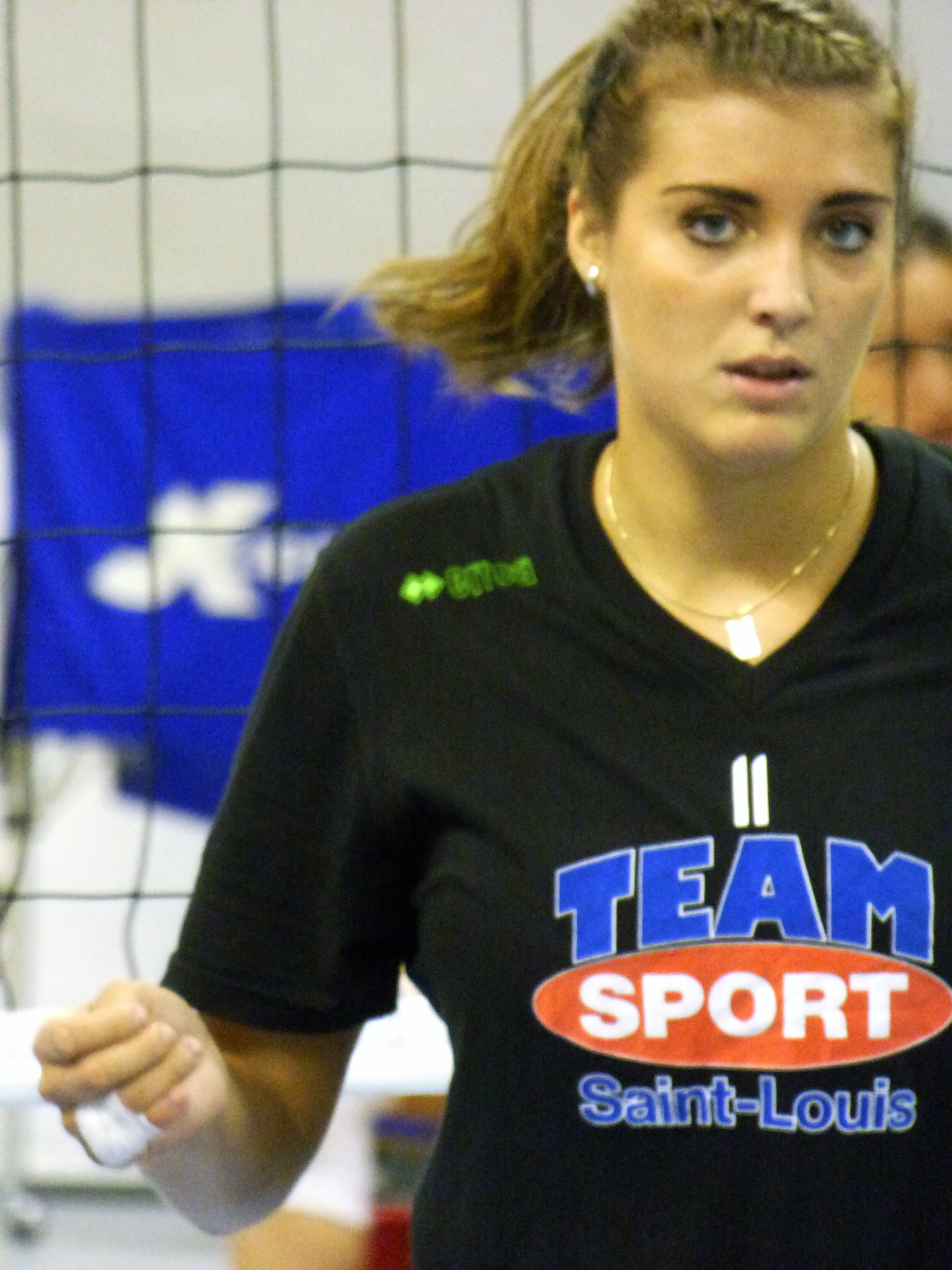
- Abrhámová in 2017

Personal information
- Nationality: Slovak
- Born: 31 August 1993 (age 33); Bratislava, Slovakia
- Height: 1.87 m (6 ft 1 1/2 in)
- Weight: 63 kg (139 lb)
- Spike: 304 cm (120 in)
- Block: 294 cm (116 in)

Volleyball information
- Position: Middle blocker

National team
2013–2023	Slovakia

Michaela Abrhámová (born 31 August 1993) is a Slovak retired volleyball player who played as a middle blocker.

Abrhámová was born on 31 August 1993 in Bratislava. Although both of her parents were volleyball players, she was initially more interested in ice skating, gymnastics and swimming before eventually realizing she preferred team sports.

Abrhámová started her career at VK Doprastav Bratislava in 2011. With the team, she won the Slovak championship in 2012 and 2014.

In 2014 she relocated to France, where she played for ES Le Cannet, AS Saint-Raphaël, ASPTT Mulhouse, Volero Le Cannet before ending her career in 2023 with Mo Mougins, following the dissolution of the club.

Between 2013 and 2023 she also played for the Slovak national team.
