= Women's CEV Cup =

European volleyball tournament

CEV Cup
- Current season, competition or edition: 2025–26 Women's CEV Cup
- Formerly: CEV Women's Cup Winners Cup (1972–2000); CEV Women's Top Teams Cup (2000–2007)
- Sport: Volleyball
- Founded: 1972; 54 years ago
- Administrator: CEV
- No. of teams: 32 (Main phase)
- Country: CEV members
- Continent: Europe
- Most recent champions: (Turkey) Galatasaray (1st title)
- Most titles: (Soviet Union) / (Russia) CSKA Moscow (4 titles)
- Website: Official website

The Women's CEV Cup, formerly known as CEV Cup Winners' Cup (from 1972 to 2000) and CEV Top Teams Cup (from 2000 to 2007), is the second-top official competition for women's volleyball clubs of Europe and takes place every year. It is organized by the Confédération Européenne de Volleyball (CEV) and was created in 1972 as CEV Cup Winners' Cup. In 2000 it was renamed the CEV Top Teams Cup and in 2007 it became the CEV Cup following a CEV decision to transfer the name of its third competition to its second one, the former CEV Cup (third competition) was renamed CEV Challenge Cup.

== Results summary ==
=== Cup Winners Cup ===
Season	Champion	Result	Runner-up	Third
1972–73	(Soviet Union) CSKA Moscow		(Bulgaria) CSKA Sofia	(Romania) Penicilina Iași
1973–74	(Soviet Union) CSKA Moscow		(Czechoslovakia) Rudá Hvězda Praha	(Romania) Dinamo București
1974–75	(East Germany) SC Traktor Schwerin		(Soviet Union) CSKA Moscow	(Czechoslovakia) Slavia Bratislava
1975–76	(Czechoslovakia) Slavia Bratislava		(Bulgaria) CSKA Sofia	(West Germany) US Medico Münster
1976–77	(Soviet Union) Iskra Voroshilovgrad		(East Germany) Dynamo Berlin	(Hungary) Újpesti Dózsa
1977–78	(East Germany) Dynamo Berlin		(Czechoslovakia) TJK Brno	(West Germany) 1.VC Schwerte 1968
1978–79	(Czechoslovakia) Rudá Hvězda Praha		(East Germany) Traktor Schwerin	(Poland) Start Łódź
1979–80	(Hungary) Vasas Izzó Budapest		(West Germany) USC Münster	(Italy) Alidea Catania
1980–81	(Hungary) Vasas Izzó Budapest		(Soviet Union) Spartak Leningrad	(Bulgaria) CSKA Sofia
1981–82	(Bulgaria) CSKA Sofia		(Soviet Union) Dynamo Moscow	(Czechoslovakia) Slavia Bratislava
1982–83	(Soviet Union) Medin Odesa		(Czechoslovakia) Rudá Hvězda Praha	(Italy) Nelson Reggio Emilia
1983–84	(East Germany) Dynamo Berlin		(Italy) Nelson Reggio Emilia	(Czechoslovakia) Rudá Hvězda Praha
1984–85	(East Germany) Dynamo Berlin		(Soviet Union) Uralochka Sverdlovsk	(Bulgaria) Akademik Sofia
1985–86	(Soviet Union) Uralochka Sverdlovsk		(West Germany) SV Lohhof	(Hungary) Újpesti Dózsa
1986–87	(Soviet Union) Kommunalnik Minsk		(Italy) Nelson Reggio Emilia	(West Germany) SG JDZ Feuerbach
1987–88	(Soviet Union) CSKA Moscow		(Italy) AS Volley Modena	(East Germany) Traktor Schwerin
1988–89	(Soviet Union) ADK Alma-Ata		(East Germany) Traktor Schwerin	(Soviet Union) CSKA Moscow
1989–90	(Soviet Union) ADK Alma-Ata		(Italy) Braglia Ceramica Reggio Emilia	(East Germany) Traktor Schwerin
1990–91	(Soviet Union) ADK Alma-Ata	3–2	(Bulgaria) CSKA Sofia	(Germany) Bayern Lohhof
1991–92	(Germany) USC Münster	3–2	(Italy) Sirio Perugia	(Germany) Schweriner SC
1992–93	(Germany) CJD Berlin	3–1	(Azerbaijan) BZBK Baku	(Italy) Sirio Perugia
1993–94	(Italy) Brummel Ancona	3–1	Racing de France Paris	(Poland) Komfort Police
1994–95	(Italy) Volley Modena	3–2	(Germany) USC Münster	(Italy) Brummel Ancona
1995–96	(Italy) Anthesis Modena	3–0	(France) VBC Riom	(Russia) CSKA Moscow
1996–97	(Italy) Anthesis Modena	3–0	(France) VBC Riom	(Russia) CSKA Moscow
1997–98	(Russia) CSKA Moscow	3–2	(France) RC Cannes	(Italy) Volley Modena
1998–99	(Turkey) Eczacıbaşı Istanbul	3–1	(Italy) Cermagica Reggio Emilia	(Greece) Filathletic Club Vrilissia
1999–00	(Italy) Pallavolo Sirio Perugia	3–0	(Greece) Panathinaikos Athens	(Turkey) Enka Istanbul

=== Top Teams Cup ===
Season	Champion	Result	Runner-up	Third
2000–01	(Belgium) Asterix Kieldrecht	3–2	(Austria) Telekom Post Wien	(Ukraine) Dynamo Jinestra Odesa
2001–02	(Azerbaijan) Azerrail Baku	3–0	(Serbia and Montenegro) Jedinstvo Užice	(Poland) Bank Pocztowy Bydgoszcz
2002–03	(France) RC Villebon 91	3–0	(Switzerland) Zeiler Köniz	(Belgium) Eburon Tongeren
2003–04	(Turkey) Güneş Vakıfbank Istanbul	3–0	(Germany) Ulm Aliud Pharma	(Belgium) Eburon Tongeren
2004–05	(Italy) Pallavolo Chieri	3–0	(Germany) TSV Bayer 04 Leverkusen	(Turkey) Eczacıbaşı Istanbul
2005–06	(Italy) Sant'Orsola Asystel Novara	3–0	(Russia) Dinamo Moscow	(Netherlands) Longa '59 Lichtenvoorde
2006–07	(Spain) Grupo 2002 Murcia	3–0	(Russia) CSKA Moscow	(Germany) Schweriner SC

=== CEV Cup ===
Season	Champion	Result	Runner-up	Third / semifinalists
2007–08	(Italy) Scavolini Pesaro	3–0	(France) Rocheville Le Cannet	(Serbia) Crvena Zvezda Beograd
2008–09	(Italy) Asystel Novara	3–0	(Russia) Uralochka NTMK Ekaterinburg	(Turkey) Fenerbahçe Acıbadem Istanbul
2009–10	(Italy) Yamamay Busto Arsizio	3–1	(Serbia) Crvena Zvezda Beograd	(Azerbaijan) Rabita Baku
2010–11	(Italy) Chateau d'Ax Urbino	3–0, 3–1	(Russia) Dinamo Krasnodar	(Poland) Tauron MKS Dąbrowa Górnicza (Serbia) Crvena Zvezda Beograd
2011–12	(Italy) Yamamay Busto Arsizio	1–3, 3–1 (GS 15–9)	(Turkey) Galatasaray Istanbul	(Italy) Robur Tiboni Urbino (Romania) 2004 Tomis Constanța
2012–13	(Poland) Bank BPS Fakro Muszyna	3–2, 3–2	(Turkey) Fenerbahçe	(Russia) Omichka Omsk (Russia) Uralochka NTMK Ekaterinburg
2013–14	(Turkey) Fenerbahçe	3–2, 3–0	(Russia) Uralochka NTMK Ekaterinburg	(Azerbaijan) Azeryol Baku (Germany) Dresdner SC
2014–15	(Russia) Dinamo Krasnodar	3–0, 1–3 (GS 15–10)	(Poland) PGE Atom Trefl Sopot	(Azerbaijan) Rabita Baku (Turkey) Galatasaray Daikin Istanbul
2015–16	(Russia) Dinamo Krasnodar	2–3, 3–0	(Turkey) Galatasaray Daikin Istanbul	(Azerbaijan) Azeryol Baku (Germany) Schweriner SC
2016–17	(Russia) Dinamo Kazan	3–1, 3–2	(Italy) Unet Yamamay Busto Arsizio	(Italy) Pomì Casalmaggiore (Turkey) Galatasaray Daikin Istanbul
2017–18	(Turkey) Eczacıbaşı Istanbul	3–1, 3–0	(Belarus) Minchanka Minsk	(Germany) SSC Palmberg Schwerin (Germany) Allianz MTV Stuttgart
2018–19	(Italy) Yamamay Busto Arsizio	3–0, 3–1	(Romania) Alba Blaj	(Romania) CS Știința Bacău (Hungary) Békéscsabai RSE
2019–20	Cancelled due to the COVID-19 pandemic			
2020–21	(Italy) Saugella Monza	3–0, 3–0	(Turkey) Galatasaray Istanbul	(France) Béziers Volley (Serbia) TENT Obrenovac
2021–22	(Turkey) Eczacıbaşı Dynavit Istanbul	3–1, 3–1	(Germany) Allianz MTV Stuttgart	(Romania) Alba Blaj (Croatia) Mladost Zagreb
2022–23	(Italy) Scandicci	3–1, 3–0	(Romania) Alba Blaj	(Turkey) THY Istanbul (Romania) CSM Târgoviște
2023–24	(Italy) Chieri '76	3–0, 3–1	(Switzerland) Vitéos NUC Volleyball	(Poland) Budowlani Łódź (France) Levallois Paris
2024–25	(Italy) Igor Gorgonzola Novara	3–1, 3–0	(Romania) Alba Blaj	(Hungary) Vasas Óbuda Budapest (Turkey) THY Istanbul
2025–26	(Turkey) Galatasaray Istanbul	3–2, 3–1	(Italy) Chieri '76	(Germany) Dresdner SC (Romania) CSO Voluntari

Note: The third place match was abolished in 2010. The table's column "Third" display the losing semifinalists from season 2010–11 onwards.

== Titles by club ==
Rank	Club	Titles	Years
1	(Soviet Union) / (Russia) CSKA Moscow	4	1972–73, 1973–74, 1987–88, 1997–98
2	(Turkey) Eczacıbaşı Istanbul	3	1998–99, 2017–18, 2021–22
2	(East Germany) SC Dynamo Berlin	3	1977–78, 1983–84, 1984–85
2	(Soviet Union) ADK Alma-Ata	3	1988–89, 1989–90, 1990–91
2	(Italy) Volley Modena	3	1994–95, 1995–96, 1996–97
2	(Italy) Futura Volley Busto Arsizio	3	2009–10, 2011–12, 2018–19
7	(Hungary) Vasas SC	2	1979–80, 1980–81
7	(Italy) Asystel Volley	2	2005–06, 2008–09
7	(Russia) Dinamo Krasnodar	2	2014–15, 2015–16
10	(East Germany) SC Traktor Schwerin	1	1974–75
10	(Czechoslovakia) Slavia Bratislava	1	1975–76
10	(Soviet Union) Iskra Voroshilovgrad	1	1976–77
10	(Czechoslovakia) Rudá Hvězda Praha	1	1978–79
10	(Bulgaria) CSKA Sofia	1	1981–82
10	(Soviet Union) Medin Odesa	1	1982–83
10	(Soviet Union) Uralochka Sverdlovsk	1	1985–86
10	(Soviet Union) Kommunalnik Minsk	1	1986–87
10	(Germany) USC Münster	1	1991–92
10	(Germany) CJD Berlin	1	1992–93
10	(Italy) Brogliaccio Pallavolo Ancona	1	1993–94
10	(Italy) Pallavolo Sirio Perugia	1	1999–00
10	(Belgium) Asterix Kieldrecht	1	2000–01
10	(Azerbaijan) Azerrail Baku	1	2001–02
10	(France) RC Villebon 91	1	2002–03
10	(Turkey) Vakıfbank Sports Club	1	2003–04
10	(Italy) Chieri Volley	1	2004–05
10	(Spain) Grupo 2002 Murcia	1	2006–07
10	(Italy) Robursport Volley Pesaro	1	2007–08
10	(Italy) Robur Tiboni Volley Urbino	1	2010–11
10	(Poland) Muszynianka Muszyna	1	2012–13
10	(Turkey) Fenerbahçe	1	2013–14
10	(Russia) Dinamo Kazan	1	2016–17
10	(Italy) Saugella Monza	1	2020–21
10	(Italy) Scandicci	1	2022–23
10	(Italy) Chieri '76	1	2023–24
10	(Italy) Igor Gorgonzola Novara	1	2024–25
10	(Turkey) Galatasaray Daikin	1	2025–26

== Titles by country ==
Notes:

1. For the purpose of keeping historical event accuracy, historical countries names are used in this table.

Rank	Country	Won	Runner-up	Total
1	Italy	17	8	25
2	Soviet Union	10	4	14
3	Turkey	6	4	10
4	Russia	4	5	9
5	East Germany	4	3	7
6	Germany	2	4	6
7	Czechoslovakia	2	3	5
8	Hungary	2	–	2
9	France	1	5	6
10	Bulgaria	1	3	4
11	Poland	1	1	2
11	Azerbaijan	1	1	2
13	Belgium	1	–	1
13	Spain	1	–	1
15	Romania	–	3	3
16	West Germany	–	2	2
16	Switzerland	–	2	2
18	Greece	–	1	1
18	Serbia	–	1	1
18	Austria	–	1	1
18	Belarus	–	1	1
18	Serbia and Montenegro	–	1	1

== MVP by edition ==
- 2003–04 – Neslihan Demir (TUR)
- 2004–05 – Logan Tom (USA)
- 2005–06 – Taismary Agüero (CUB)
- 2006–07 – Lyubov Sokolova (RUS)
- 2007–08 – Vesna Jovanovic (SRB)
- 2008–09 – Cristina Barcellini (ITA)
- 2009–10 – Carmen Turlea (ROM)
- 2010–11 – Chiara Di Iulio (ITA)
- 2011–12 – Aneta Havlíčková (CZE)
- 2012–13 – Sanja Popović (CRO)
- 2013–14 – Kim Yeon-koung (KOR)
- 2014–15 – Tatiana Kosheleva (RUS)
- 2015–16 – Natalia Malykh (RUS)
- 2016–17 – Valentina Diouf (ITA)
- 2017–18 – Tijana Bošković (SRB)
- 2018–19 – Britt Herbots (BEL)
- 2020–21 – Alessia Orro (ITA)
- 2021–22 – Maja Ognjenović (SRB)
- 2022–23 – Ekaterina Antropova (ITA)
- 2023–24 – Kaja Grobelna (BEL)
- 2024–25 – Tatiana Tolok (RUS)
- 2025–26 – İlkin Aydın (TUR)

== All-time team records ==
Winners and finalists by city since 1972/1973

Location	Winners	Finalists
Istanbul (Turkey)	5	4
Moscow (Russia)	4	4
Berlin (Germany)	4	0
Modena (Italy)	3	1
Busto Arsizio (Italy)	3	1
Alma-Ata (Kazakhstan)	3	0
Budapest (Hungary)	2	1
Krasnodar (Russia)	2	1
Novara (Italy)	2	0
Sofia (Bulgaria)	1	3
Yekaterinburg (Russia)	1	3
Schwerin (Germany)	1	2
Münster (Germany)	1	2
Praha (Czech Republic)	1	2
Minsk (Belarus)	1	1
Perugia (Italy)	1	1
Villebon-Sur-Yvette (France)	1	1
Baku (Azerbaijan)	1	0
Bratislava (Slovakia)	1	0
Ancona (Italy)	1	0
Odesa (Ukraine)	1	0
Beveren (Belgium)	1	0
Chieri (Italy)	1	0
Kazan (Russia)	1	0
Monza (Italy)	1	0
Murcia (Spain)	1	0
Muszyna (Poland)	1	0
Pesaro (Italy)	1	0
Urbino (Italy)	1	0
Voroshilovgrad (Ukraine)	1	0
Reggio Emilia (Italy)		4
Riom (France)		3
Belgrade (Serbia)		1
Unterschleißheim (Germany)		1
Athínai (Greece)		1
Blaj (Romania)		1
Brno (Czech Republic)		1
Cannes (France)		1
Köniz (Switzerland)		1
Le Cannet (France)		1
Leverkusen (Germany)		1
Saint Petersburg (Russia)		1
Schwechat (Austria)		1
Sopot (Poland)		1
Ulm (Germany)		1
Uzice (Serbia)		1
Stuttgart (Germany)		1
Tongeren (Belgium)		
Bucuresti (Romania)		
Bydgoszcz (Poland)		
Catania (Italy)		
Feuerbach (Germany)		
Iasi (Romania)		
Lódz (Poland)		
Lichtenvoorde (Netherlands)		
Police (Poland)		
Schwerte (Germany)		
Vrilissia (Greece)		

Various statistics since 2006/2007

Number of appearances
1	Asterix Avo Beveren	12
2	Nova Branik Maribor	11
3	Volero Le Cannet	10
4	Khimik Yuzhny Odesa	9
5	SK UP Olomouc	9
6	Stiinta Bacau	9
7	ZOK Jedinstvo Brcko	9
8	Galatasaray Istanbul	8
9	LP Viesti Salo	8
10	Neuchâtel Université	8

Number of matches
1	Galatasaray Istanbul	64
2	Busto Arsizio	51
3	Uralochka NTMK Ekaterinbur.	44
4	Dinamo Krasnodar	44
5	Schweriner SC	38
6	Asterix Avo Beveren	38
7	Stiinta Bacau	36
8	Red Star Beograd	36
9	Bielsko-Biala	34
10	Fenerbahçe Istanbul	32

Wins
1	Galatasaray Istanbul	46
2	Busto Arsizio	41
3	Dinamo Krasnodar	34
4	Uralochka NTMK Ekaterinbur.	31
5	Fenerbahçe Istanbul	26
6	Schweriner SC	26
7	Red Star Beograd	22
8	Bielsko-Biala	21
9	Volero Le Cannet	19
10	Béziers	18

Number of wins in games played
1	Asystel Novara	100 %
2	KPS Chemik Police	100 %
3	Murcia 2005	100 %
4	Scavolini Pesaro	100 %
5	Eczacibasi Istanbul	94 %
6	Dinamo Kazan	93 %
7	MKS Muszyna	85 %
8	Saugella Team Monza	83 %
9	Trefl Sopot	83 %
10	Robur Tiboni Urbino	82 %

(Based on W=2 pts and D=1 pts)

	Team	S	Firs	Best	Pts	MP	W	L	GF	GA	diff
1	Galatasaray Istanbul (TUR)	8	2010/2011	2nd	110	64	46	18	156	74	+82
2	Busto Arsizio (ITA)	7	2009/2010	1st	92	51	41	10	135	58	+77
3	Dinamo Krasnodar (RUS)	4	2010/2011	1st	78	44	34	10	111	44	+67
4	Uralochka NTMK Ekaterinburg (RUS)	8	2008/2009	2nd	75	44	31	13	106	54	+52
5	Schweriner SC (GER)	7	2006/2007	3rd	64	38	26	12	90	46	+44
6	Fenerbahçe Istanbul (TUR)	3	2008/2009	1st	58	32	26	6	85	25	+60
7	Red Star Beograd (SCG)	7	2007/2008	2nd	58	36	22	14	75	58	+17
8	Bielsko-Biala (POL)	6	2006/2007	-	55	34	21	13	72	49	+23
9	Asterix Avo Beveren (BEL)	12	2006/2007	-	54	38	16	22	59	80	-21
10	Stiinta Bacau (ROM)	9	2006/2007	-	53	36	18	17	63	68	-5
11	Volero Le Cannet (FRA)	10	2007/2008	2nd	51	32	19	13	64	51	+13
12	Nova Branik Maribor (SLO)	11	2009/2010	-	49	32	17	15	57	64	-7
13	Béziers (FRA)	5	2012/2013	-	46	28	18	10	63	38	+25
14	Rote Raben Vilsbiburg (GER)	7	2008/2009	4th	45	28	17	11	63	44	+19
15	Khimik Yuzhny Odesa (UKR)	9	2011/2012	-	45	31	14	17	55	64	-9
16	Volley Köniz (SWI)	7	2007/2008	-	42	28	14	14	51	52	-1
17	Minchanka Minsk (BLR)	7	2007/2008	2nd	41	27	14	13	52	47	+5
18	Robur Tiboni Urbino (ITA)	2	2010/2011	1st	40	22	18	4	57	23	+34
19	Békéscsabai RSE (HUN)	6	2015/2016	-	40	25	15	10	47	44	+3
20	LP Viesti Salo (FIN)	8	2010/2011	-	38	26	12	14	42	49	-7
21	MKS Muszyna (POL)	3	2012/2013	1st	37	20	17	3	53	27	+26
22	VB Niederösterreich Sokol/Post SV (AUT)	5	2009/2010	-	35	24	11	13	46	46	0
23	MTV Stuttgart (GER)	5	2011/2012	-	34	22	12	10	46	36	+10
24	Eczacibasi Istanbul (TUR)	3	2009/2010	1st	31	16	15	1	45	12	+33
25	Omichka Omsk (RUS)	3	2008/2009	-	31	18	13	5	43	20	+23
26	Dabrowa Górnicza (POL)	3	2010/2011	-	31	18	13	5	44	29	+15
27	SK UP Olomouc (CZE)	9	2012/2013	-	31	22	9	13	35	45	-10
28	Neuchâtel Université (SWI)	8	2010/2011	-	30	22	8	14	38	51	-13
29	Dinamo Kazan (RUS)	2	2016/2017	1st	29	15	14	1	42	10	+32
30	Dresdner SC (GER)	5	2010/2011	-	27	18	9	9	34	31	+3
31	Volei 2004 Constanta (ROM)	5	2009/2010	-	27	18	9	9	32	31	+1
32	ZOK Jedinstvo Brcko (BIH)	9	2010/2011	-	26	22	4	18	18	55	-37
33	Casalmaggiore (ITA)	2	2016/2017	-	24	14	10	4	33	16	+17
34	Saugella Team Monza (ITA)	2	2019/2020	1st	22	12	10	2	31	7	+24
35	Trefl Sopot (POL)	1	2014/2015	2nd	22	12	10	2	31	9	+22
36	Azerrail Baku (AZE)	3	2008/2009	-	22	16	6	10	30	35	-5
37	Hämeenlinna HPK (FIN)	5	2014/2015	-	22	16	6	10	25	33	-8
38	Lokomotiv Baku (AZE)	2	2013/2014	-	21	12	9	3	29	11	+18
39	Telekom Baku (AZE)	3	2007/2008	3rd	21	14	7	7	28	25	+3
40	Alba Blaj CSV (ROM)	4	2014/2015	2nd	21	14	7	7	25	23	+2
41	Atlant Baranovichi (BLR)	3	2007/2008	-	21	14	7	7	26	28	-2
42	Královo Pole Brno (CZE)	7	2010/2011	-	21	18	3	15	20	47	-27
43	HAOK Mladost Zagreb (CRO)	6	2007/2008	-	20	15	5	10	19	33	-14
44	Longa '59 Lichtenvoorde (NED)	3	2006/2007	4th	19	12	7	5	22	24	-2
45	Dinamo Bucarest (ROM)	6	2007/2008	-	19	14	5	9	24	33	-9
46	VDK Gent Dames (BEL)	6	2007/2008	-	18	14	4	10	17	34	-17
47	Charleroi Volley (BEL)	4	2009/2010	-	18	14	4	10	17	35	-18
48	Olympiacos Piraeus (GRE)	6	2010/2011	-	18	14	4	10	15	33	-18
49	Yenisei Krasnoyarsk (RUS)	2	2017/2018	-	17	10	7	3	23	12	+11
50	Hapoel Kfar Saba (ISR)	4	2013/2014	-	17	11	6	5	20	20	0
51	NRK Nyíregyháza (HUN)	4	2017/2018	-	17	12	5	7	18	28	-10
52	Sliedrecht Sport (NED)	6	2008/2009	-	17	14	3	11	13	35	-22
53	TS Volley Düdingen (SWI)	6	2016/2017	-	17	14	3	11	12	34	-22
54	ASKÖ Linz-Steg (AUT)	5	2010/2011	-	17	14	3	11	14	39	-25
55	Asystel Novara (ITA)	1	2008/2009	1st	16	8	8	0	24	1	+23
56	Scavolini Pesaro (ITA)	1	2007/2008	1st	16	8	8	0	24	2	+22
57	Tent Obrenovac (SCG)	3	2010/2011	-	16	10	6	4	21	14	+7
58	Ciutadella Menorca (SPA)	2	2009/2010	-	16	10	6	4	20	15	+5
59	AEK Athens (GRE)	3	2011/2012	-	16	10	6	4	21	21	0
60	CSM Târgoviste (ROM)	5	2015/2016	-	16	12	4	8	20	25	-5
61	Mulhouse ASPTT (FRA)	5	2010/2011	-	16	12	4	8	19	27	-8
62	Igtisadchi Baku (AZE)	3	2011/2012	-	15	10	5	5	18	18	0
-	Azeryol Baku (AZE)	1	2015/2016	-	15	10	5	5	18	18	0
64	Samorodok Khabarovsk (RUS)	1	2007/2008	4th	14	8	6	2	20	6	+14
65	Kanti Schaffhausen (SWI)	3	2008/2009	-	14	10	4	6	16	20	-4
66	Calcit Volleyball Kamnik (SLO)	6	2010/2011	-	14	11	3	8	13	26	-13
67	VFM Franches-Montagnes (SWI)	5	2006/2007	-	14	12	2	10	10	30	-20
68	Jinestra Odesa (UKR)	2	2007/2008	-	13	8	5	3	15	13	+2
69	Dinamo Pancevo (SCG)	2	2008/2009	-	13	9	4	5	12	16	-4
70	Maccabi XT Haifa (ISR)	6	2011/2012	-	13	12	1	11	6	35	-29
71	Murcia 2005 (SPA)	1	2006/2007	1st	12	6	6	0	18	0	+18
72	KPS Chemik Police (POL)	1	2019/2020	-	12	6	6	0	18	4	+14
73	Albacete (SPA)	2	2007/2008	-	12	8	4	4	16	14	+2
74	Palac Bydgoszcz (POL)	2	2007/2008	-	12	8	4	4	15	13	+2
75	Stella E.S. Calais (FRA)	1	2012/2013	-	12	8	4	4	15	16	-1
76	VK Prostejov (CZE)	4	2013/2014	-	12	10	2	8	12	24	-12
77	Budowlani Lódz (POL)	2	2010/2011	-	11	8	3	5	14	15	-1
78	Clube Desportivo Ribeirense (POR)	3	2007/2008	-	11	8	3	5	13	18	-5
79	Istres Ouest Provence (FRA)	3	2009/2010	-	11	8	3	5	12	17	-5
80	Partizan Vizura Beograd (SCG)	4	2010/2011	-	11	9	2	7	11	25	-14
81	Sparkasse Klagenfurt (AUT)	4	2007/2008	-	11	10	1	9	7	28	-21
82	Imoco Volley Conegliano (ITA)	1	2014/2015	-	10	6	4	2	14	9	+5
83	CV Logroño (SPA)	1	2014/2015	-	10	6	4	2	12	7	+5
84	CSKA Moscow (RUS)	1	2006/2007	2nd	10	6	4	2	13	10	+3
85	Saint-Raphaël (FRA)	1	2018/2019	-	9	6	3	3	13	10	+3
86	Besiktas Istanbul (TUR)	1	2010/2011	-	9	6	3	3	10	10	0
87	Krug Cherkasy (UKR)	2	2006/2007	-	9	6	3	3	9	9	0
88	Maritza Plovdiv (BUL)	2	2015/2016	-	9	6	3	3	11	12	-1
89	ZOK Pivovara Osijek (CRO)	2	2007/2008	-	9	6	3	3	10	12	-2
90	GEN-I Volley Nova Gorica (SLO)	2	2007/2008	-	9	6	3	3	9	12	-3
91	VC Weert (NED)	4	2009/2010	-	9	8	1	7	11	23	-12
92	Orbita Zaporizhzhia (UKR)	3	2013/2014	-	9	8	1	7	9	22	-13
93	Albi (FRA)	3	2006/2007	-	9	8	1	7	9	23	-14
94	Panathinaikos Athens (GRE)	4	2007/2008	-	9	8	1	7	6	22	-16
95	Volejbal Brno (CZE)	2	2019/2020	-	8	5	3	2	11	8	+3
96	Hermes Oostende (BEL)	2	2015/2016	-	8	6	2	4	11	12	-1
97	Baku VK (AZE)	1	2012/2013	-	8	6	2	4	10	14	-4
98	CS Madeira (POR)	4	2006/2007	-	8	8	0	8	5	24	-19
99	ZOK Ub (SCG)	1	2020/2021	-	7	4	3	1	10	5	+5
100	Vasas Budapest (HUN)	2	2020/2021	-	7	4	3	1	9	5	+4
101	Postar 064 Beograd (SCG)	1	2006/2007	-	7	4	3	1	10	8	+2
102	Jedinstvo Stara Pazova (SCG)	2	2016/2017	-	7	6	1	5	8	15	-7
103	SF Paris St-Cloud (FRA)	3	2013/2014	-	7	6	1	5	7	17	-10
104	VC Oudegem (BEL)	4	2013/2014	-	7	6	1	5	6	16	-10
105	Luka Bar (MNE)	2	2016/2017	-	7	6	1	5	4	16	-12
106	CV Haris La Laguna Tenerife (SPA)	1	2019/2020	-	6	4	2	2	7	6	+1
107	Kangasala LP (FIN)	1	2015/2016	-	6	4	2	2	9	9	0
108	Developres Rzeszów (POL)	1	2019/2020	-	6	4	2	2	8	8	0
109	AMVJ Amstelveen (NED)	1	2007/2008	-	6	4	2	2	7	7	0
110	Spartak Subotica (SCG)	1	2015/2016	-	6	4	2	2	7	8	-1
-	Kontynium Volyn Lutsk (UKR)	1	2012/2013	-	6	4	2	2	7	8	-1
112	CSU Belor Galati (ROM)	1	2007/2008	-	6	4	2	2	7	9	-2
113	Pila PTPS (POL)	1	2009/2010	-	6	4	2	2	6	10	-4
114	ZOK Split 1700 (CRO)	3	2009/2010	-	6	6	0	6	4	18	-14
115	OK Spodnja Savinjska Sempeter (SLO)	1	2020/2021	-	5	3	2	1	6	3	+3
116	Sm'Aesch Pfeffingen (SWI)	1	2018/2019	-	5	4	1	3	7	9	-2
117	IG Novara Trecate (ITA)	2	2014/2015	-	5	4	1	3	7	10	-3
118	SC Potsdam (GER)	2	2019/2020	-	5	4	1	3	6	9	-3
119	UVC Graz (AUT)	1	2018/2019	-	5	4	1	3	6	10	-4
120	Zoersel GHA (BEL)	1	2014/2015	-	5	4	1	3	5	10	-5
121	VK Slavia Bratislava (SVK)	2	2006/2007	-	5	4	1	3	3	9	-6
122	VC Sneek (NED)	2	2015/2016	-	5	4	1	3	3	10	-7
123	Nantes Volley-Ball (FRA)	3	2014/2015	-	5	4	1	3	3	11	-8
124	Impel Wroclaw (POL)	2	2009/2010	-	4	4	0	4	4	12	-8
-	Severodonchanka Severodonetsk (UKR)	2	2009/2010	-	4	4	0	4	4	12	-8
126	DYO Karsiyaka Izmir (TUR)	2	2007/2008	-	4	4	0	4	2	12	-10
-	CSM Bucuresti (ROM)	2	2017/2018	-	4	4	0	4	2	12	-10
-	Eurosped - TVT Almelo (NED)	2	2015/2016	-	4	4	0	4	2	12	-10
129	Apollon Limassol (CYP)	2	2011/2012	-	4	4	0	4	1	12	-11
130	Kohila VK (EST)	2	2015/2016	-	4	4	0	4	0	12	-12
-	KV Drita Gjilan (KOS)	2	2016/2017	-	4	4	0	4	0	12	-12
132	Nordmeccanica Piacenza (ITA)	1	2012/2013	-	3	2	1	1	5	3	+2
133	VC Tirol Innsbruck (AUT)	1	2016/2017	-	3	2	1	1	4	4	0
134	Volley Bergamo (ITA)	1	2010/2011	-	3	2	1	1	3	3	0
135	TJ Ostrava (CZE)	1	2018/2019	-	3	2	1	1	4	5	-1
136	Bialystok (POL)	1	2012/2013	-	3	2	1	1	3	4	-1
137	Cannes RC (FRA)	1	2016/2017	-	3	2	1	1	3	5	-2
-	Wiesbaden VC (GER)	1	2015/2016	-	3	2	1	1	3	5	-2
-	TED Ankara Kolejliler (TUR)	1	2012/2013	-	3	2	1	1	3	5	-2
-	Førde VBK (NOR)	1	2018/2019	-	3	2	1	1	3	5	-2
-	Banja Luka Volley (BIH)	2	2019/2020	-	3	2	1	1	3	5	-2
142	Voléro Zürich (SWI)	1	2009/2010	-	2	2	0	2	4	6	-2
143	Cat Trofa (POR)	1	2006/2007	-	2	2	0	2	3	6	-3
-	Radnicki Beograd (SCG)	1	2011/2012	-	2	2	0	2	3	6	-3
-	OK Porec (CRO)	1	2013/2014	-	2	2	0	2	3	6	-3
146	Ilbank SK Ankara (TUR)	1	2011/2012	-	2	2	0	2	2	6	-4
-	AO Thiras Santorini (GRE)	2	2016/2017	-	2	2	0	2	2	6	-4
148	AEK Larnaca (CYP)	1	2007/2008	-	2	2	0	2	1	6	-5
-	ZOK Rijeka (CRO)	1	2012/2013	-	2	2	0	2	1	6	-5
-	Volksbank Velika Gorica (CRO)	1	2009/2010	-	2	2	0	2	1	6	-5
-	Anorthosis Famagusta (CYP)	1	2010/2011	-	2	2	0	2	1	6	-5
-	PVK Olymp Praha (CZE)	2	2020/2021	-	2	2	0	2	1	6	-5
-	SC Prometey Kamyanske (UKR)	1	2020/2021	-	2	2	0	2	1	6	-5
154	Levski Siconco Sofia (BUL)	1	2018/2019	-	2	2	0	2	0	6	-6
-	Tongeren VC (BEL)	1	2008/2009	-	2	2	0	2	0	6	-6
-	Doprastav Bratislava (SVK)	1	2008/2009	-	2	2	0	2	0	6	-6
-	OTP Banka Pula (CRO)	1	2008/2009	-	2	2	0	2	0	6	-6
-	Universidad Burgos (SPA)	1	2007/2008	-	2	2	0	2	0	6	-6
-	Volley 80 Petange (LUX)	1	2007/2008	-	2	2	0	2	0	6	-6
-	Holte IF (DEN)	1	2007/2008	-	2	2	0	2	0	6	-6
-	VK Senica (SVK)	1	2006/2007	-	2	2	0	2	0	6	-6
-	CS Rapid Bucuresti (ROM)	1	2006/2007	-	2	2	0	2	0	6	-6
-	Pays d'Aix Venelles (FRA)	1	2017/2018	-	2	2	0	2	0	6	-6
-	AEL Limassol (CYP)	1	2009/2010	-	2	2	0	2	0	6	-6
-	Tirana Volley (ALB)	1	2010/2011	-	2	2	0	2	0	6	-6
-	ZOK Vukovar (CRO)	1	2011/2012	-	2	2	0	2	0	6	-6
-	Kuusamon Pallo-Karhut (FIN)	1	2020/2021	-	2	2	0	2	0	6	-6
-	Minatori Rreshen (ALB)	1	2012/2013	-	2	2	0	2	0	6	-6
-	Legionovia Legionowo (POL)	1	2020/2021	-	2	2	0	2	0	6	-6
-	Bursa BBSK (TUR)	1	2013/2014	-	2	2	0	2	0	6	-6
-	LP Vampula Huittinen (FIN)	1	2020/2021	-	2	2	0	2	0	6	-6
-	Partizani Tirana (ALB)	1	2019/2020	-	2	2	0	2	0	6	-6
-	OK Kastela (CRO)	1	2019/2020	-	2	2	0	2	0	6	-6
174	Zeljeznicar Lajkovac (SCG)	2	2018/2019	-	1	2	0	1	3	6	-3
175	Türk Telekom Ankara (TUR)	1	2009/2010	-	1	1	0	1	0	3	-3
-	Proton Volleyball Club Balakovo (RUS)	2	2020/2021	-	1	1	0	1	0	3	-3

== See also ==
  - Men's
- CEV Champions League
- CEV Challenge Cup
- CEV Cup
- FIVB Volleyball Men's Club World Championship
  - Women's
- CEV Women's Champions League
- CEV Women's Challenge Cup
- CEV Cup Women's
- FIVB Volleyball Women's Club World Championship
