= 2021–22 CEV Women's Champions League qualification =

This article shows the qualification phase for 2021–22 CEV Women's Champions League. 10 teams will play in this tournament. The two remaining teams will join the other 18 teams automatically qualified to the League round based on the European Cups' Ranking List. All 8 eliminated teams will then compete in 2021–22 Women's CEV Cup.

== First round ==
- 4 teams compete in this round. Winners advance to the Second round and losers compete in CEV Cup

Team 1	Agg.	Team 2	1st leg	2nd leg	Golden Set
CV Gran Canaria (Spain)	3–3	(Croatia) Mladost Zagreb	1–3	3–1	9−15
Olympiacos Piraeus (Greece)	6–0	(Belgium) Asterix Avo	3–1	3–1	

Leg 1

21 September 2021; 19:00	Olympiacos Piraeus (Greece)	3−1	(Belgium) Asterix Avo	Melina Merkouri, Greece; Referees: Roy Goren (ISR), Salvis Kurtiss (LAT)
21 September 2021; 19:00	(21−25,25−18,25−21,25−23); Report CLW 03			Melina Merkouri, Greece; Referees: Roy Goren (ISR), Salvis Kurtiss (LAT)

22 September 2021; 18:00	CV Gran Canaria (Spain)	1−3	(Croatia) Mladost Zagreb	Centro Insular de Deportes, Spain; Referees: Christian Peter Wolf (SUI), Vitor Alexandre Goncalves (POR)
22 September 2021; 18:00	(18−25,18−25,25−21,23−25); Report CLW 01			Centro Insular de Deportes, Spain; Referees: Christian Peter Wolf (SUI), Vitor Alexandre Goncalves (POR)

Leg 2

28 September 2021; 18:30	Asterix Avo (Belgium)	1−3	(Greece) Olympiacos Piraeus	Topsporthal Beveren, Belgium; Referees: Maciej Twardowski (POL), Helena Geldof (NED)
28 September 2021; 18:30	(20−25,25−14,18−25,20−25); Report CLW 04			Topsporthal Beveren, Belgium; Referees: Maciej Twardowski (POL), Helena Geldof (NED)

30 September 2021; 19:00	Mladost Zagreb (Croatia)	1−3	(Spain) CV Gran Canaria	Dom odbojke Bojan Stranić, Croatia; Referees: Vladimir Simonovic (SRB), Blaz Markelj (SLO)
30 September 2021; 19:00	(20−25,25−14,18−25,20−25); Report CLW 02			Dom odbojke Bojan Stranić, Croatia; Referees: Vladimir Simonovic (SRB), Blaz Markelj (SLO)

30 September 2021; 21:30	Mladost Zagreb (Croatia)	15−9	(Spain) CV Gran Canaria	Dom odbojke Bojan Stranić, Croatia; Referees: Vladimir Simonovic (SRB), Blaz Markelj (SLO)
30 September 2021; 21:30	Golden Set			Dom odbojke Bojan Stranić, Croatia; Referees: Vladimir Simonovic (SRB), Blaz Markelj (SLO)

== Second round ==
- 8 teams compete in this round. Winners advance to the Third round and losers compete in CEV Cup

Team 1	Agg.	Team 2	1st leg	2nd leg	Golden Set
Mladost Zagreb (Croatia)	1–5	(Switzerland) Viteos Neuchatel	0–3	2–3	
SC Prometey (Ukraine)	6–0	(Slovenia) Calcit Kamnik	3–1	3–1	
ŽOK Ub (Serbia)	6–0	(Bosnia and Herzegovina) ŽOK Bimal-Jedinstvo	3–0	3–0	
Olympiacos Piraeus (Greece)	5–1	(Belarus) Minchanka Minsk	3–2	3–0	

Leg 1

06 October 2021; 19:00	Mladost Zagreb (Croatia)	0−3	(Switzerland) Viteos Neuchatel	Dom odbojke Bojan Stranić, Croatia; Referees: Tudor Pop (ROU), Juraj Mokry (SVK)
06 October 2021; 19:00	(18−25,19−25,21−25); Report CLW 05			Dom odbojke Bojan Stranić, Croatia; Referees: Tudor Pop (ROU), Juraj Mokry (SVK)

06 October 2021; 19:00	ŽOK Ub (Serbia)	3−0	(Bosnia and Herzegovina) ŽOK Bimal-Jedinstvo	Sports Hall UB, Serbia; Referees: Alexey Pashkevich (RUS), Tibor Halasz (HUN)
06 October 2021; 19:00	(25−16,25−15,25−19); Report CLW 09			Sports Hall UB, Serbia; Referees: Alexey Pashkevich (RUS), Tibor Halasz (HUN)

07 October 2021; 19:00	SC Prometey (Ukraine)	3−1	(Slovenia) Calcit Kamnik	Yunist Palace of Sports, Ukraine; Referees: Konstantin Yovchev (BUL), Ari Jokelainen (FIN)
07 October 2021; 19:00	(23−25,25−21,25−21,25−23); Report CLW 07			Yunist Palace of Sports, Ukraine; Referees: Konstantin Yovchev (BUL), Ari Jokelainen (FIN)

07 October 2021; 19:00	Olympiacos Piraeus (Greece)	3−2	(Belarus) Minchanka Minsk	Melina Merkouri, Greece; Referees: Helena Geldof (NED), Stefano Cesare (ITA)
07 October 2021; 19:00	(25−21,25−27,25−23,20−25,15−13); Report CLW 11			Melina Merkouri, Greece; Referees: Helena Geldof (NED), Stefano Cesare (ITA)

Leg 2

13 October 2021; 19:00	ŽOK Bimal-Jedinstvo (Bosnia and Herzegovina)	0−3	(Serbia) ŽOK Ub	Sportska Dvorana Magnet, Bosnia and Herzegovina; Referees: Vladimir Oleynik (RUS), Michail Koutsoulas (GRE)
13 October 2021; 19:00	(16−25,14−25,15−25); Report CLW 10			Sportska Dvorana Magnet, Bosnia and Herzegovina; Referees: Vladimir Oleynik (RUS), Michail Koutsoulas (GRE)

13 October 2021; 20:00	Calcit Kamnik (Slovenia)	1−3	(Ukraine) SC Prometey	Sportna Dvorana Kamnik, Slovenia; Referees: Aleksander Sikanjic (LIE), Jörg Kellenberger (GER)
13 October 2021; 20:00	(21−25,27−25,29−31,12−25); Report CLW 08			Sportna Dvorana Kamnik, Slovenia; Referees: Aleksander Sikanjic (LIE), Jörg Kellenberger (GER)

14 October 2021; 18:00	Minchanka Minsk (Belarus)	0−3	(Greece) Olympiacos Piraeus	Minsk Sports Palace, Belarus; Referees: Andrii Kovalchuk (URK), Alexander Ryabtsov (RUS)
14 October 2021; 18:00	(19−25,22−25,22−25); Report CLW 12			Minsk Sports Palace, Belarus; Referees: Andrii Kovalchuk (URK), Alexander Ryabtsov (RUS)

14 October 2021; 20:00	Viteos Neuchatel (Switzerland)	3−2	(Croatia) Mladost Zagreb	Halle de sport de la Riveraine, Switzerland; Referees: Igor Porvaznik (SVK), Paul Catalin Szabo-Alexi (ROU)
14 October 2021; 20:00	(25−20,25−17,19−25,21−25,15−10); Report CLW 06			Halle de sport de la Riveraine, Switzerland; Referees: Igor Porvaznik (SVK), Paul Catalin Szabo-Alexi (ROU)

== Third round ==
- 4 teams compete in this round.
- Winners enter the League round and loser will compete in CEV Cup.

Team 1	Agg.	Team 2	1st leg	2nd leg	Golden Set
Viteos Neuchatel (Switzerland)	0–6	(Ukraine) SC Prometey	0–3	1–3	
ŽOK Ub (Serbia)	5–1	(Greece) Olympiacos Piraeus	3–2	3−0	

Leg 1

27 October 2021; 19:00	ŽOK Ub (Serbia)	3–2	(Greece) Olympiacos Piraeus	Sports Hall UB, Serbia; Referees: Sanja Miklosic (SLO), Ksenija Jurkovic (CRO)
27 October 2021; 19:00	(16–25, 25–23, 25–19, 18–25, 15–13); Report CLW 15			Sports Hall UB, Serbia; Referees: Sanja Miklosic (SLO), Ksenija Jurkovic (CRO)

27 October 2021; 20:00	Viteos Neuchatel (Switzerland)	0–3	(Ukraine) SC Prometey	Halle de sport de la Riveraine, Switzerland; Referees: Peter Szabo (HUN), Olivier Guillet (FRA)
27 October 2021; 20:00	(19–25, 14–25, 20–25); Report CLW 13			Halle de sport de la Riveraine, Switzerland; Referees: Peter Szabo (HUN), Olivier Guillet (FRA)

Leg 2

04 November 2021; 16:30	Olympiacos Piraeus (Greece)	0–3	(Serbia) ŽOK Ub	Melina Merkouri, Greece; Referees: Sabine Witte (GER), Roy Goren (ISR)
04 November 2021; 16:30	(19–25, 23–25, 31–33); Report CLW 16			Melina Merkouri, Greece; Referees: Sabine Witte (GER), Roy Goren (ISR)

04 November 2021; 19:00	SC Prometey (Ukraine)	3–1	(Switzerland) Viteos Neuchatel	Yunist Palace of Sports, Ukraine; Referees: Erdal Akinci (TUR), Zsolt Mezoffy (HUN)
04 November 2021; 19:00	(22–25, 25–16, 25–20, 25–13); Report CLW 14			Yunist Palace of Sports, Ukraine; Referees: Erdal Akinci (TUR), Zsolt Mezoffy (HUN)

== Final standing ==
Rank	Team
1st place, gold medalist(s)	(Ukraine) SC Prometey
(Serbia) ŽOK Ub
3rd place, bronze medalist(s)	(Greece) Olympiacos Piraeus
(Switzerland) Viteos Neuchatel
5	(Slovenia) Calcit Kamnik
5	(Belarus) Minchanka Minsk
(Croatia) Mladost Zagreb
(Bosnia and Herzegovina) ŽOK Bimal-Jedinstvo
10	(Belgium) Asterix Avo
(Spain) CV Gran Canaria

Qualified for the 2021–22 CEV Women's Champions League
Qualified for the 2021–22 Women's CEV Cup
