= ASPTT Mulhouse =

- Full name: ASPTT Mulhouse Volley-Ball
- Founded: 1974
- Ground: Palais des Sports, Mulhouse, France (Capacity: 3,700)
- Chairman: Daniel Braun
- Head coach: Magali Magail
- League: Ligue AF
- 2016–17: 1st
- Website: Club home page

Uniforms
Home	Away

ASPTT Mulhouse is a French women's volleyball club based in Mulhouse and playing in the Ligue AF.

== History ==
The club was established in 1974 and has various women's teams (girls, juniors, senior) participating in local, regional and national competitions. The senior team participated in the lower divisions of the French Championships for the first time in 1975 and has since achieved promotions to reach the Ligue AF in 1992. The club has finished second in both the Ligue AF (1997–98, 1998–99, 2006–07, 2007–08, 2008–09, 2009–10, 2010–11, 2011–12) and the French Cup (1999–00, 2008–09, 2009–10, 2011–12) and has played in European competitions (Champions League, CEV Cup and Challenge Cup) since the 1990s, including a third place in the 1997–98 CEV Cup.

The club won its first major trophy in 2016–17 by winning the French Championship.

== Honours ==
=== National competitions ===
- French Championship: 1

2016–17

== Team ==
Season 2017–2018, as of August 2017.

No.	Name	Date of birth	Height	Weight	Spike	Block	Position
1	(Serbia) Bojana Marković	20 June 1990 (age 36)	1.78 m (5 ft 10 in)	67 kg (148 lb)	292 cm (115 in)	282 cm (111 in)	Outside-spiker
2	(United States) Alexa Marie Dannemiller	9 June 1993 (age 33)	1.80 m (5 ft 11 in)	74 kg (163 lb)	296 cm (117 in)	289 cm (114 in)	Setter
3	(Ukraine) Olga Trach	28 March 1984 (age 42)	1.88 m (6 ft 2 in)	65 kg (143 lb)	300 cm (120 in)	282 cm (111 in)	Middle-blocker
4	(Belgium) Britt Herbots	24 November 1999 (age 26)	1.82 m (6 ft 0 in)	66 kg (146 lb)	310 cm (120 in)	290 cm (110 in)	Outside-spiker
5	(United Kingdom) Ciara Michel	7 February 1985 (age 41)	1.95 m (6 ft 5 in)	71 kg (157 lb)	318 cm (125 in)	294 cm (116 in)	Middle-blocker
6	(France) Manon Jaegy	25 October 2001 (age 24)	1.61 m (5 ft 3 in)	47 kg (104 lb)	238 cm (94 in)	228 cm (90 in)	Libero
7	(Belgium) Aziliz Divoux	3 January 1995 (age 31)	1.83 m (6 ft 0 in)	68 kg (150 lb)	293 cm (115 in)	278 cm (109 in)	Setter
8	(France) Lisa Jeanpierre	28 July 1999 (age 27)	1.83 m (6 ft 0 in)	72 kg (159 lb)	304 cm (120 in)	286 cm (113 in)	Outside-spiker
9	(France) Léa Soldner	10 February 1996 (age 30)	1.74 m (5 ft 9 in)	71 kg (157 lb)	271 cm (107 in)	254 cm (100 in)	Libero
10	(United States) Hayley Spelman	11 June 1991 (age 35)	2.03 m (6 ft 8 in)	78 kg (172 lb)	321 cm (126 in)	297 cm (117 in)	Opposite
11	(Slovakia) Michaela Abrhámová	31 August 1993 (age 33)	1.88 m (6 ft 2 in)	85 kg (187 lb)	299 cm (118 in)	287 cm (113 in)	Middle-blocker
12	(Montenegro) Katarina Budrak	5 February 1998 (age 28)	1.95 m (6 ft 5 in)	82 kg (181 lb)	309 cm (122 in)	294 cm (116 in)	Outside-spiker
13	(France) Lara Davidović	13 December 1997 (age 28)	1.84 m (6 ft 0 in)	74 kg (163 lb)	304 cm (120 in)	285 cm (112 in)	Outside-spiker
14	(France) Aurelia Ebatombo	1 October 1998 (age 28)	1.84 m (6 ft 0 in)	65 kg (143 lb)	261 cm (103 in)	273 cm (107 in)	Outside-spiker
16	(France) Margaux Chambon	3 May 2000 (age 26)	1.67 m (5 ft 6 in)	76 kg (168 lb)	251 cm (99 in)	242 cm (95 in)	Setter
17	(France) Laura Dreyer	26 August 1999 (age 27)	1.77 m (5 ft 10 in)	62 kg (137 lb)	272 cm (107 in)	264 cm (104 in)	Middle-blocker
17	(Peru) Carla Rueda	19 April 1990 (age 36)	1.81 m (5 ft 11 in)	75 kg (165 lb)	295 cm (116 in)	286 cm (113 in)	Outside-spiker
Coach: (France) Magali Magail

2010–2011 Team
(Romania) Alina Albu
(France) Aminata Coulibaly
(France) Alexia Djilali
(France) Armelle Faesch
(France) Laura Feldgiesel
(France) Arsela Haka
(France) Myriam Kloster
(France) Lucile Minla
(France) Déborah Ortschitt
(France) Anna Rybaczewski
(France) Isaline Sager Weider
(Poland) Dominika Sieradzan
(France) Esther Taglang
