= UYBA Volley =

Italian professional women's volleyball club

- Full name: UYBA Volley
- Nickname: Le Farfalle (The Butterflies)
- Founded: 1998
- Ground: E-Work Arena, Busto Arsizio, Italy (Capacity: 4,490)
- Chairman: Giuseppe Pirola
- Head coach: Enrico Barbolini
- League: FIPAV Women's Serie A1
- Website: Club home page

Uniforms
| Home | Away |

UYBA Volley is an Italian professional women's volleyball club based in Busto Arsizio, in the province of Varese. The team currently plays in the Serie A1, Italy's highest professional league.

== Previous names ==
Due to sponsorship, the club have competed under the following names:

- Brums Busto Arsizio (2000–2002)
- Dimeglio Brums Busto Arsizio (2002–2006)
- Yamamay Busto Arsizio (2006–2012)
- Unendo Yamamay Busto Arsizio (2012–2016)
- Unet Yamamay Busto Arsizio (2016–2017)
- Unet E-Work Busto Arsizio (2017–2022)
- E-Work Busto Arsizio (2022–2023)
- UYBA Volley Busto Arsizio (2023–2024)
- Eurotek UYBA Busto Arsizio (2024–2025)
- Eurotek Laica UYBA (2025–2026)
- Laica Cioccolato UYBA (2026–)

== History ==
In 1996, Serie A1 club Unione Sportiva Cistellum Volley was playing at the Palazzetto dello Sport in Cislago, a venue with small capacity, forcing the club to look for a new home venue. In 1997, when the nearby city of Busto Arsizio inaugurated a 4,490 seat venue named PalaYamamay-Maria Piantanida, Cistellum decided to relocate to Busto Arsizio where it remained for three seasons. After relegation to Serie A2 at the end of the 1999–00 season, the club transferred all its sporting activities to Yamamay and Futura Volley Busto Arsizio is created.

The club's first season was at the Serie A2 in 2000–01, promotion to the Serie A1 was achieved after seven seasons, in 2007. The first title was the 2009–10 Women's CEV Cup and in 2012 the club won four titles (Serie A1, Italian Cup, CEV Cup and Italian Super Cup).

== Arena ==
The team currently plays at the E-Work Arena, an indoor arena owned by the municipality of Busto Arsizio.

== Supporters ==
The main group of supporters of the Yamamay Busto Arsizio is called "Amici delle Farfalle" (AdF) (Friends of the butterflies).

== Team ==
2026–2027 Team
| Number | Player | Position | Height (m) | Birth date |
|---|---|---|---|---|
| 1 | (Italy) Valeria Battista (c) | Outside Hitter | 1.79 | 23 January 2001 (age 25) |
| 2 | (Italy) Federica Pelloni | Libero | 1.72 | 26 December 2002 (age 23) |
| 3 | (Italy) Ajack Malual | Opposite | 1.86 | 3 June 2002 (age 24) |
| 4 | (Italy) Maia Monaco | Middle Blocker | 1.86 | 12 July 2006 (age 20) |
| 5 | (Japan) Nanami Seki | Setter | 1.71 | 12 June 1999 (age 27) |
| 6 | (Italy) Dalila Marchesini | Middle Blocker | 1.85 | 3 January 2006 (age 20) |
| 10 | (Italy) Francesca Parlangeli | Libero | 1.65 | 23 February 1990 (age 36) |
| 11 | (Italy) Asia Spaziano | Setter | 1.88 | 18 March 2007 (age 19) |
| 13 | (Italy) Matilde Munarini | Middle Blocker | 1.86 | 3 June 2004 (age 22) |
| 15 | (Spain) Paola Martínez Vela | Opposite | 1.82 | 5 July 1998 (age 28) |
| 18 | (Italy) Alice Torcolacci | Middle Blocker | 1.84 | 27 February 2000 (age 26) |
| 19 | (Germany) Leana Grozer | Outside Hitter | 1.83 | 23 April 2007 (age 19) |
| 20 | (Japan) Miku Otomo | Outside Hitter | 1.85 | 18 August 2006 (age 20) |
| 21 | (Japan) Yukiko Wada | Opposite | 1.74 | 8 January 2002 (age 24) |
| 23 | (Mexico) Melanie Parra | Outside Hitter | 1.81 | 12 September 2002 (age 24) |

== Current coaching staff ==
| Enrico Barbolini | 1 January 1970 (age 56) | Head coach |
| Filippo Lualdi | 7 May 1992 (age 34) | Assistant coach |

== Honours ==
=== National competitions ===
- National League: 1

2011–12

- Coppa Italia: 1

2011–12

- Italian Super Cup: 1

2012

=== International competitions ===
- CEV Cup: 3

2009–10, 2011–12, 2018–19
