= Aslı Kalaç =

Turkish volleyball player (born 1995)

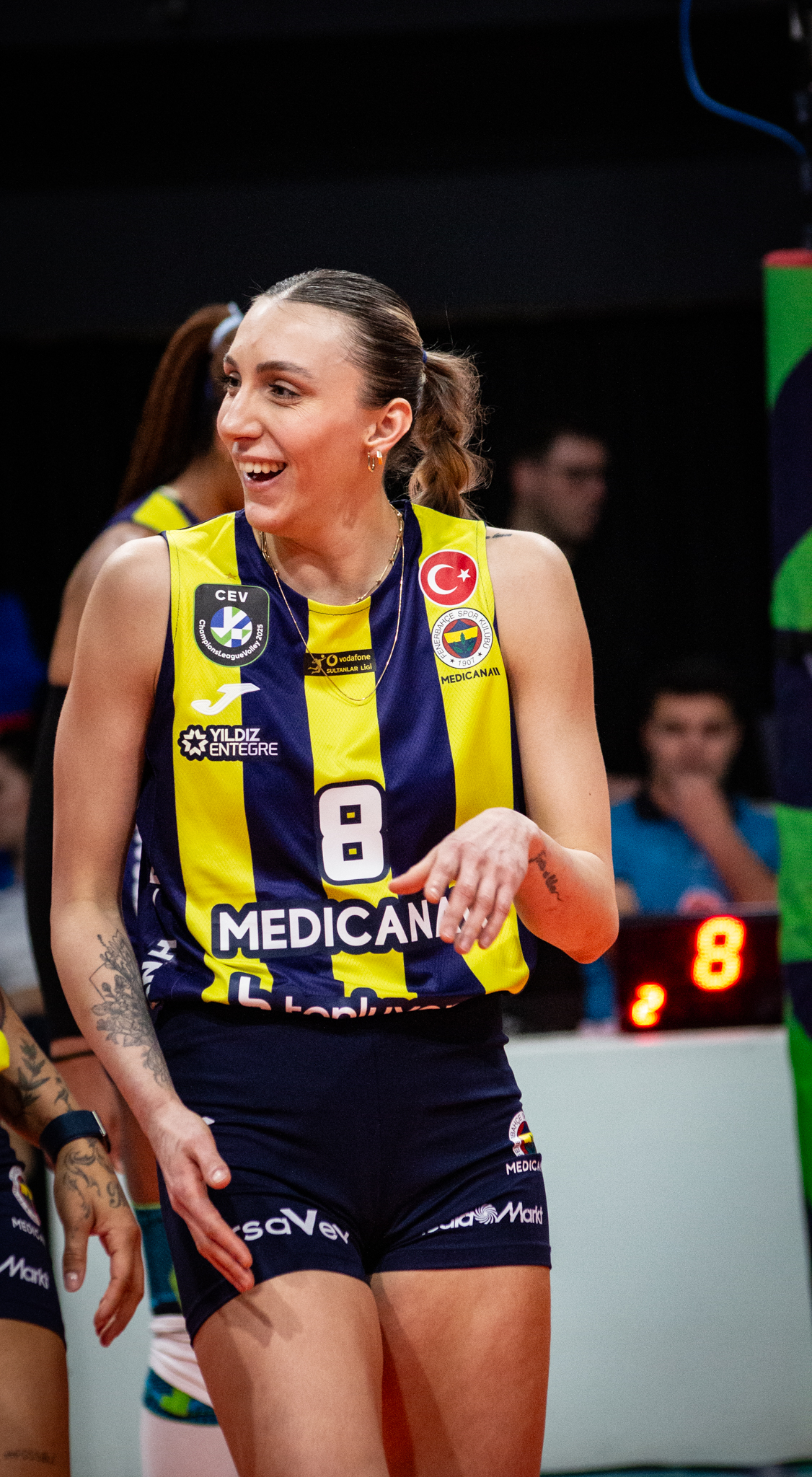
- Kalaç in 2025

Personal information
- Born: 13 December 1995 (age 30); Istanbul, Turkey
- Height: 1.83 m (6 ft 0 in)
- Weight: 73 kg (161 lb)
- Spike: 296 cm (117 in)
- Block: 289 cm (114 in)

Volleyball information
- Position: Middle blocker
- Current club: Eczacıbaşı Dynavit
- Number: 9

Career
Years
- 2006-09
- 2009-11
- 2011-13
- 2013-20
- 2020-22
- 2022-2026
- 2026-
Teams
- Yeşilyurt
- TVF Sport High School
- Yeşilyurt
- Galatasaray
- Türk Hava Yolları
- Fenerbahçe
- Eczacıbaşı Dynavit

National team
- 2011
- 2013-present
- (Turkey) Girls' youth
- Turkey
Honours
Women's volleyball
Representing Turkey
FIVB World Championship
| Silver medal – second place | 2025 Thailand | Team |
FIVB Nation's League
| Gold medal – first place | 2023 Arlington | Team |
| Gold medal – first place | 2026 Macau | Team |
| Bronze medal – third place | 2021 Rimini | Team |
European Championship
| Gold medal – first place | 2023 Belgium/Italy/Estonia/Germany | Team |
Mediterranean Games
| Bronze medal – third place | 2018 Tarragona | Team |
European Games
| Gold medal – first place | 2015 Baku | Team |
Montreux Volley Masters
| Gold medal – first place | 2015 Montreux | Team |
Women's U23 World Championship
| Gold medal – first place | 2017 Ljubljana | Team |
Women's Junior European Championship
| Gold medal – first place | 2012 Ankara | Team |
Girls Youth World Championship
| Gold medal – first place | 2012 Ankara | Team |
European Youth Summer Olympic Festival
| Bronze medal – third place | 2011 Trabzon | Team |

Aslı Kalaç (born 13 December 1995) is a Turkish volleyball player. She is 183 cm (6.00 ft) tall at 73 kg (161 lb) and plays in the middle blocker position. She plays for Eczacıbaşı Dynavit. Kalaç debuted in the girls' youth national team in 2011, and is currently a member of the Turkey women's junior national volleyball team. She wears number 8.

She was born on 13 December 1995, in Istanbul. Her father canalized her in the summer of 2006 to volleyball after she was engaged in swimming as a sport for one year. In the beginning, she was coached by Münip Özdurak at Yeşilyurt Women's Volleyball Team. After playing for two seasons at the TVF Sport High School, she signed in July 2011 for Yeşilyurt Women's Volleyball, which competes in the Turkish Women's Volleyball League. She transferred to Galatasaray. She played seven seasons before went to THY. She finally to Fenerbahçe.

== Clubs ==
- (Turkey) Yeşilyurt (2006–2009)
- (Turkey) TVF Sport High School (2009–2011)
- (Turkey) Yeşilyurt (2011–2013)
- (Turkey) Galatasaray (2013–2020)
- (Turkey) Türk Hava Yolları (2020–2022)
- (Turkey) Fenerbahçe (2022–2026)
- (Turkey) Eczacıbaşı Dynavit (2026–today)

== Awards ==
=== National team ===
- 2011 FIVB Girls Youth World Championship – Gold
- 2011 European Youth Summer Olympic Festival – Bronze
- 2012 Women's Junior European Volleyball Championship – Gold
- 2021 Nations League Bronze
- 2023 Nations League Gold
- 2023 European Championship Gold
- 2025 FIVB World Championship: (silver)

=== Clubs ===
- 2015–16 Women's CEV Cup – Silver (with Galatasaray)
- 2014–15 Turkish Women's Volleyball League – Bronze (with Galatasaray)
- 2015–16 Turkish Women's Volleyball League – Bronze (with Galatasaray)
- 2016–17 Turkish Women's Volleyball League – Silver (with Galatasaray)
- 2017–18 Turkish Women's Volleyball League – Bronze (with Galatasaray)
- 2018–19 Turkish Women's Volleyball League – Bronze (with Galatasaray)
- 2020–21 Turkish Women's Volleyball League – Bronze (with THY)
- 2022–23 CEV Champions League – Bronze (with Fenerbahçe)
- 2022 Turkish Volleyball Super Cup – Gold (with Fenerbahçe)
- 2022–23 Turkish Women's Volleyball League – Gold (with Fenerbahçe)
- 2022-23 Turkish Women's Volleyball Cup – Silver (with Fenerbahçe)
- 2023–24 CEV Champions League – Bronze (with Fenerbahçe)
- 2023–24 Turkish Women's Volleyball League – Gold (with Fenerbahçe)
- 2023–24 Turkish Volleyball Cup – Gold (with Fenerbahçe)
- 2024 Turkish Volleyball Super Cup – Gold (with Fenerbahçe)
- 2024–25 Turkish Volleyball Cup – Gold (with Fenerbahçe)
- 2025 Turkish Volleyball Super Cup – Gold (with Fenerbahçe)

== See also ==
- Turkish women in sports
