= Marcello Abbondanza =

Italian volleyball coach

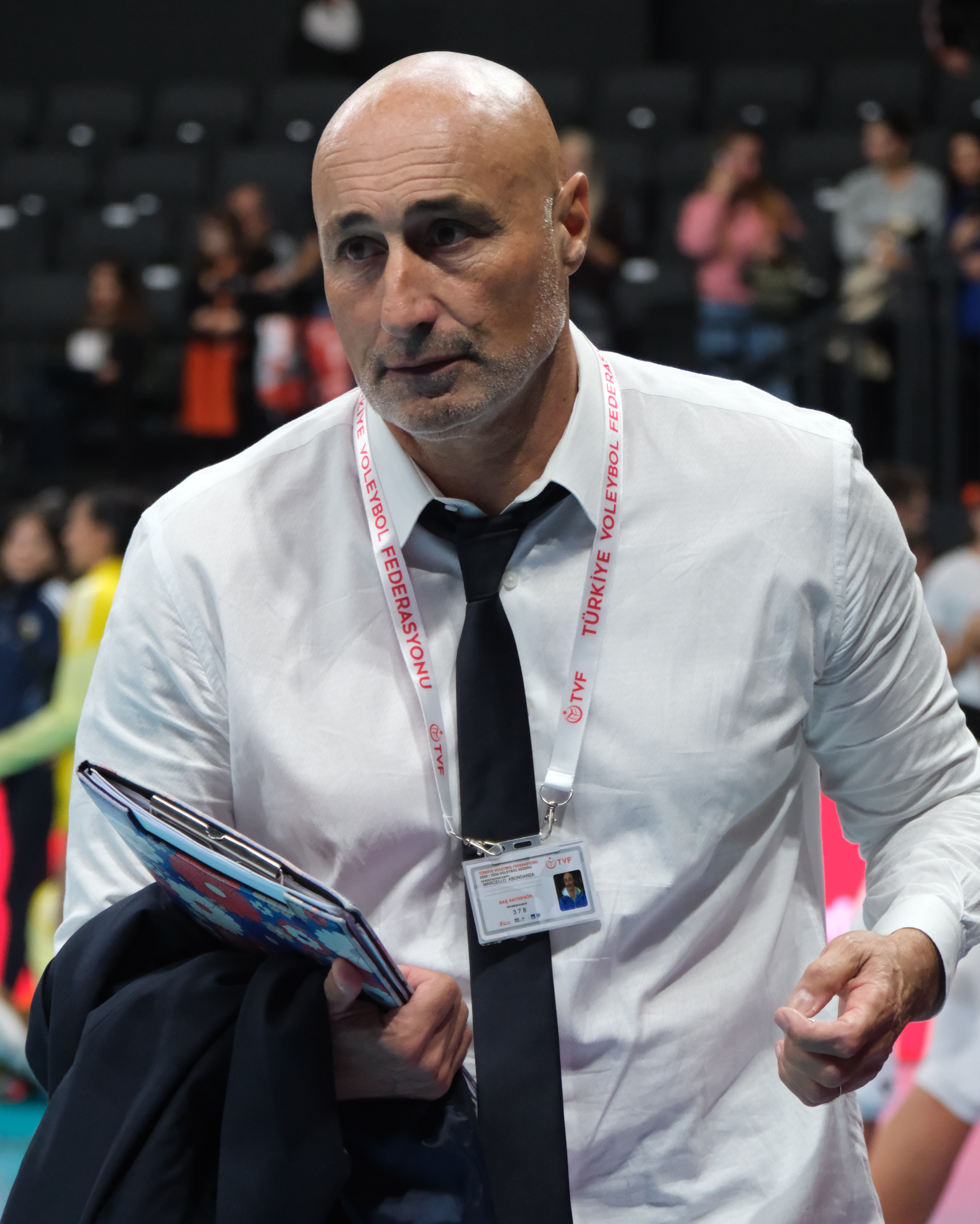
- Marcello Abbondanza 2025

Personal information
- Born: August 24, 1970 (age 56); Cesena, Italy

Volleyball information
- Position: Head coach
- Current club: (Turkey) Fenerbahçe

Career
Years
- 1996–1997
- 1998–2000
- 2002–2003
- 2003–2006
- 2006–2008
- 2008–2009
- 2009–2012
- 2012–2013
- 2013–2017
- 2017
- 2018–2019
- 2019
- 2019–2023
- 2023–2025
- 2025–present
Teams
- Olimpia Ravenna
- Bergamo
- Volley Mazzano
- Scavolini Pesaro
- Monte Schiavo Jesi
- Volley 2002 Forlì
- Carnaghi Villa Cortese
- Rabita Baku
- Fenerbahçe
- Pomì Casalmaggiore
- Chemik Police
- Bergamo
- THY
- Heungkuk Life
- Fenerbahçe

National team
- 2011–2014
- 2017–2018
- 2022-2025
- 2025-
- Bulgaria
- Canada
- Greece
- Bulgaria
Honours
Coach for Women's Volleyball National Team
Canada
Pan American Cup
| Bronze medal – third place | 2018 Santo Domingo |
Bulgaria
European League
| Bronze medal – third place | 2013 Varna |
| Silver medal – second place | 2012 Karlovy Vary |
Coach for Women's Volleyball Club
Heungkuk Life (Korea)
| Gold medal – first place | 2024–25 Korean League | Team |
| Silver medal – second place | 2023–24 Korean League | Team |
| Silver medal – second place | 2022–23 Korean League | Team |
Chemik Police (Poland)
| Gold medal – first place | 2018–19 Polish Cup | Team |
| Gold medal – first place | 2017–18 Polish League | Team |
Fenerbahçe Spor Kulübü (Turkey)
| Gold medal – first place | 2024–25 Turkish Super Cup | Team |
| Gold medal – first place | 2016–17 Turkish League | Team |
| Gold medal – first place | 2016–17 Turkish Cup | Team |
| Gold medal – first place | 2015–16 Turkish Super Cup | Team |
| Silver medal – second place | 2015–16 Turkish League | Team |
| Bronze medal – third place | 2015–16 Champions League | Team |
| Gold medal – first place | 2014–15 Turkish League | Team |
| Gold medal – first place | 2014–15 Turkish Cup | Team |
| Silver medal – second place | 2014–15 Turkish Super Cup | Team |
| Gold medal – first place | 2013–14 CEV Cup | Team |
| Silver medal – second place | 2013–14 Turkish League | Team |
| Silver medal – second place | 2013–14 Turkish Cup | Team |
Rabita Baku (Azerbaijan)
| Gold medal – first place | 2012–13 Azerbaijan League | Team |
| Silver medal – second place | 2012–13 Champions League | Team |
| Silver medal – second place | 2012–13 Club World Championship | Team |
Carnaghi Villa Cortese (Italy)
| Silver medal – second place | 2011–12 Italian League | Team |
| Gold medal – first place | 2010–11 Italian Cup | Team |
| Silver medal – second place | 2010–11 Italian League | Team |
| Gold medal – first place | 2009–10 Italian Cup | Team |
| Silver medal – second place | 2009–10 Italian League | Team |
Scavolini Pesaro (Italy)
| Gold medal – first place | 2005–06 Challenge Cup | Team |
- Last updated: 13 April 2025

Marcello Abbondanza (born August 24, 1970) is an Italian volleyball coach. He's currently coaching the Fenerbahçe, a Turkish team based in Istanbul and plays in Sultanlar Ligi.

== Career ==
He started as an assistant coach on the bench of Big Power Ravenna Team between 1996 and 1997. He was again an assistant coach between 1998 and 2000 in Foppapedretti Bergamo Team and then in 2002–2003 season he started as a head coach with the Meccanica Pierre OML Mazzano, in Serie A2 (Italian second league) and was very close to winning the league.

Afterwards he transferred Robursport Scavolini Pesaro Team in first league, for 3 seasons which won the 2005-06 CEV Cup, and for 2 seasons in Monte Schiavo Banca Marche Jesi where he led the team to a playoffs in 2006–2007 league.

After he started coaching in Infidel Forlì Team in the 2008–09 season in Serie A2. He was subsequently hired by MC PietroCarnaghi Villa Cortese, a rookie in A1 in the 2009–10 season. He won the Italian Cup for two years consecutively and led the team to the playoffs finals in 2009–10, 2010–11 and 2011–12. He was also a coach of the Italian national team at the World University Games.

He also coached the Bulgaria Women's National Team between 2011 and 2014, and won the silver medal in European League in 2012 in Czech Republic and a bronze medal in European League in 2013 in Bulgaria.

In the 2012–13 season he moved to Azerbaijan hired by Rabita Baku, which immediately won one silver medal in the World Cup for Clubs in Doha. During this season he qualified for the Final Four of the Champions League finishing the competition at second place and also he won the Azerbaijan's championship in the same season.

After signing Fenerbahçe Spor Kulübü, Abbondanza started to improve their volleyball day by day, and he won the CEV Cup in 2013–14 season. Fenerbahçe won historic double the following season, by winning the 2014–15 Turkish Cup first, and the 2014–15 Turkish Championship after.

At the beginning of his 3rd season in Fenerbahce he won the Turkish Super Cup 2015–16., the regular season of Turkish League, a silver medal in the Turkish League Finals and a bronze medal in Final Four of the Champions League, and this was his third Final Four with three different club.

The season 2016-17 is the 4th in Fenerbahce, and Marcello Abbondanza won the fifth title-winning the Turkish Cup in the Final Eight in Ankara, and this was the second time in his career, and he could defend the trophy from 2015 (tournament was not held in the season before)., but this was not the only title in this season, because after an incredible comeback in the golden set in the second semi-final of Turkish championship against Eczacıbaşı VitrA, Abbondanza won also for his second time in four years the Turkish League beating 3-0 the eternal rival Galatasaray in the Final.

In January 2017, the Volleyball Canada announces Abbondanza as new women's head coach.

In May 2017, the Volleyball Casalmaggiore announces their new head coach, and Abbondanza come back to Italy after 5 years abroad.

In his first summer with the Canada women's national volleyball team both won the gold medal at the NORCECA Senior Women's Continental Championship and qualified for the 2018 World Championships in Japan.

After be suddenly fired after only one month at the beginning of the season from Pomì Casalmaggiore, he signed in February 2018 with the polish champions Chemik Police until the end of the season, and he led the team to the gold medal.

In the summer of 2018, his second one as a head coach of Canada women's national volleyball team, won the silver medal at 2018 NORCECA Challenge Cup in Edmonton, Alberta and an historic bronze medal at the 2018 Pan American Cup, the second medal in the whole Canada women's national volleyball team's history. In the same year, in November, after two seasons as a head coach, he resigned for family reasons.

In his second season leading Chemik Police, he won another important trophy, the Polish Cup at the Final Four in Nysa, Poland.

== Record ==
In the season 2017-18 Abbondanza sets a new record as the first coach to achieve nine championship finals in a row in four different countries. He started in the season 2009–10 in Italy, passing through Azerbaijan, Turkey and Poland.
