= Beyza Arıcı =

Turkish volleyball player

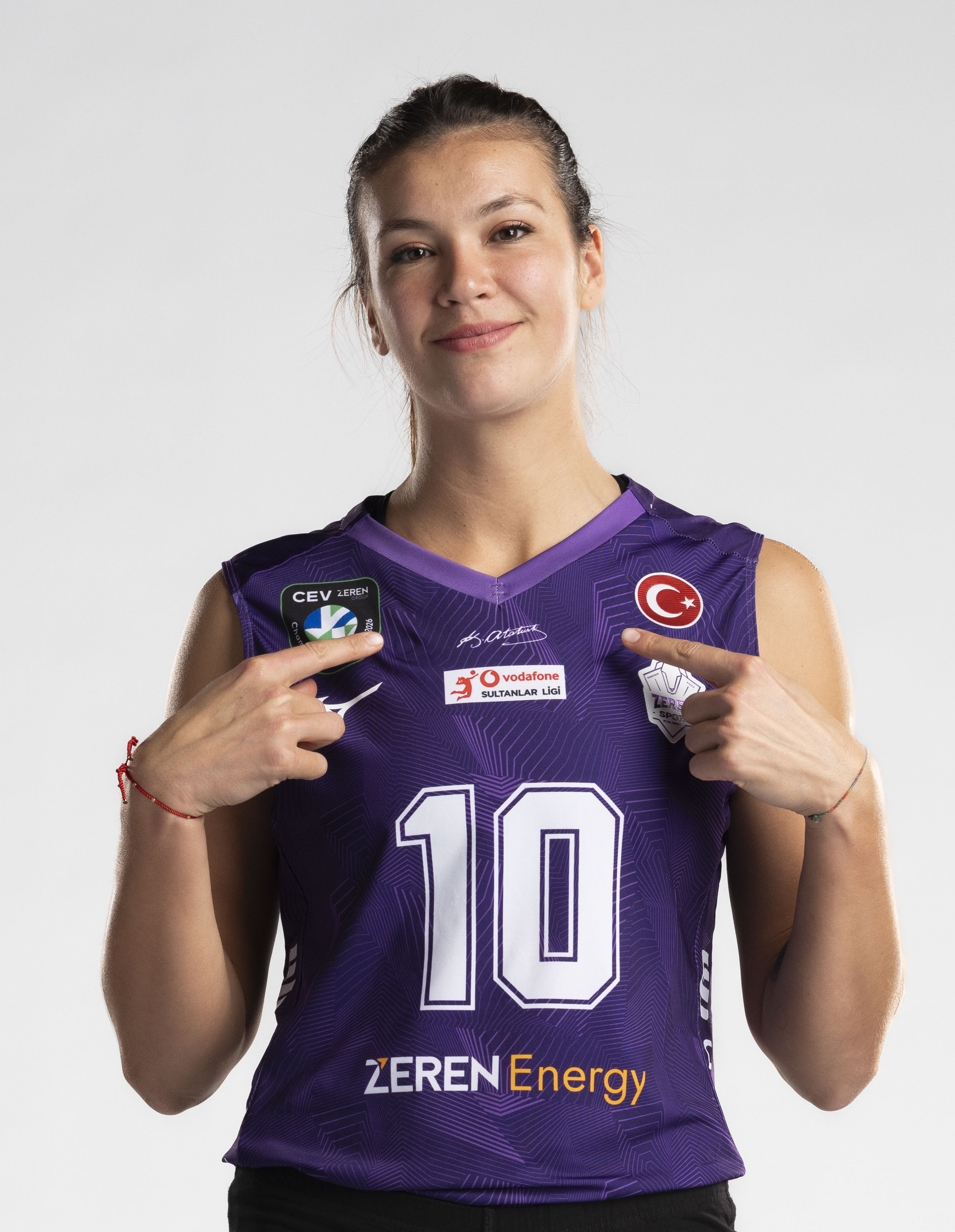

Personal information
- Nationality: Turkish
- Born: 27 July 1995 (age 31); İzmir, Turkey
- Height: 1.92 m (6 ft 4 in)
- Weight: 82 kg (181 lb)
- Spike: 302 cm (119 in)
- Block: 293 cm (115 in)

Volleyball information
- Position: Middle Blocker
- Current club: Eczacıbaşı VitrA
- Number: 4

Career
Years	Teams
–2008	Işıkkent
2008–2015	Vakıfbank
2013–2014	→ Seramiksan (loan)
2014–2015	→ Sarıyer Belediyesi (loan)
2015–2016	Trabzon İdmanocağı
2016–2017	Çanakkale Belediyesi
2017–2025	Eczacıbaşı VitrA
2025-2026	Zeren
2026-	THY S.K

National team
2017–	Turkey
Honours
Women's volleyball
Representing Turkey
FIVB Nations League
Silver medal – second place	2018 Nanjing	Team
U23 World Championship
Gold medal – first place	2017 Ljubljana

Beyza Arıcı (born 27 July 1995) is a Turkish professional volleyball player who plays as a middle blocker for Eczacıbaşı VitrA and the Turkish national team.

== Club career ==
Arıcı started playing volleyball at İzmir Işıkkent, later moved to Vakıfbank in 2008 and played youth teams of Vakıfbank until 2013. As a youngster, she struggled to break into the senior team at her club and was loaned to the second division team Seramiksan for the 2013–14 season, and the first division team Sarıyer Belediyesi for the 2014–15 season.

After two seasons on loan, Arıcı signed with Trabzon İdmanocağı in July 2015. With her new club, Arıcı reached the final at the CEV Challenge Cup where İdmanocağı were defeated by CSM București after losing both legs of the final. Despite the good performance in the Challenge Cup, İdmanocağı underperformed in the domestic competition and only just avoided relegation by finishing in tenth place in the Turkish League.

In May 2016, Arıcı agreed on a one-year contract with Çanakkale Belediyespor. She had a very successful season with her team in terms of both her individual performance and the performance of the team. Çanakkale Belediyespor finished the regular season in club's highest sixth place while Arıcı was named as the third best middle blocker of the season behind Eda Erdem Dündar and Milena Rašić. In the playoffs, Çanakkale Belediyesi lost to Eczacıbaşı VitrA in the quarter-final stage. At the end of the season, Arıcı joined Eczacıbaşı VitrA.

In her first season with Eczacıbaşı, Arıcı helped her team to win the CEV Cup, and reach the Turkish Cup final where Eczacıbaşı lost to Vakıfbank. In the Turkish League, Eczacıbaşı topped the league in the regular season and eliminated Nilüfer Belediyesi and Fenerbahçe en route to the final in the playoffs. In the final series against Vakıfbank, Eczacıbaşı had a 2–1 lead in the series but suffered two consecutive losses despite having a home court advantage in both matches and lost the series 3–2. Arıcı was voted the "best blocker" of the series and she was the only Eczacıbaşı player that was awarded.

== International career ==
Arıcı made her international debut with the Turkish national volleyball team in a World Grand Prix match against Brazil on 9 July 2017. She was the member of the Turkey U23 team that won the gold medal at the 2017 FIVB U23 World Championship in Slovenia, and was selected for the dream team of the championship as the "best middle blocker".

== Awards ==
=== Individuals ===
- 2017 FIVB U23 World Championship "Best Middle Blocker"
- 2017–18 Turkish League Final Series "Best Blocker"

=== Clubs ===
- 2015–16 CEV Challenge Cup - Runner-Up, with Trabzon İdmanocağı
- 2017–18 Turkish Cup - Runner-Up, with Eczacıbaşı VitrA
- 2017–18 CEV Cup - Champion, with Eczacıbaşı VitrA
- 2017–18 Turkish League - Runner-Up, with Eczacıbaşı VitrA
- 2018 Turkish Super Cup - Champion, with Eczacıbaşı VitrA
- 2018 FIVB Club World Championship - Bronze Medal, with Eczacıbaşı VitrA
- 2018–19 Turkish Cup - Champion, with Eczacıbaşı VitrA
- 2018–19 Turkish League - Runner-Up, with Eczacıbaşı VitrA
- 2019 Turkish Super Cup - Champion, with Eczacıbaşı VitrA
- 2020 Turkish Super Cup - Champion, with Eczacıbaşı VitrA

=== National team ===
- 2017 FIVB U23 World Championship - Gold Medal
- 2018 FIVB Nations League - Silver Medal
- 2018 Montreux Volley Masters - Bronze Medal
