= Dicle Nur Babat =

Turkish volleyball player

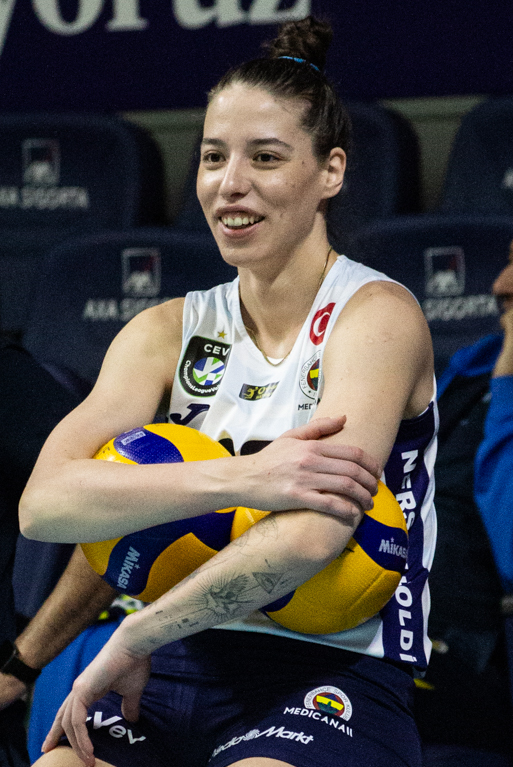
- Dicle Nur Babat in 2025

Personal information
- Born: 15 September 1992 (age 34); Kırklareli, Turkey
- Height: 1.91 m (6 ft 3 in)
- Weight: 81 kg (179 lb)
- Spike: 310 cm (122 in)
- Block: 300 cm (118 in)

Volleyball information
- Position: Middle blocker
- Current club: Fenerbahçe
- Number: 8

Career
Years	Teams
2004–2007; 2007–2011; 2011–2012; 2012–2014; 2014–2022; 2023–2024; 2024–2025; 2025-2026; 2025-2026; 2026-	Eczacıbaşı; Vakıfbank; Nilüfer Belediyesi; Beşiktaş; Fenerbahçe; Türk Hava Yolları; Fenerbahçe; Kuzeyboru; Fenerbahçe; Zeren SK

National team
Turkey
Honours
Women's volleyball
Representing Turkey
European Games
Gold medal – first place	2015 Baku	Team

Dicle Nur Babat (born 15 September 1992 in Kırklareli) is a Turkish volleyball player. She is 191 cm (6 ft 3 in) tall and plays as middle blocker for Fenerbahçe and Turkey women's national volleyball team.

== Career ==
Dicle Nur Babat began playing volleyball in the feeder team of Eczacıbaşı. After three years, she transferred to the feeder team of Vakıfbank. In the 2011-12 season, she was loaned out to Nilüfer Belediyesi in Bursa. The next season, she signed with Beşiktaş returning to Istanbul again. At the end of the first season, her team was relegated to the Second League after losing the play-off game to Galatasaray. Her contract was extended for one year in the beginning of the 2013-14 season. Following the 2013-14 season, she enjoyed runner-up title at the CEV Women's Challenge Cup with Beşiktaş.

In the beginning of the 2014-15 season, she moved to Fenerbahçe.

She capped more than 75 times in the Turkey national team.

== Honours ==
National

- Women's Junior European Volleyball Championship: (gold) 2012
- European Games: (gold) 2015

Eczacıbaşı

- CEV Cup: (bronze) 2004–05
- Turkish Women's Volleyball League: (gold) 2005–06, 2006–07 (bronze) 2004–05

VakıfBank

- CEV Champions League: (gold) 2010-11
- CEV Challenge Cup: (gold) 2007–08
- Top Volley International: (gold) 2008
- Turkish Women's Volleyball League: (silver) 2010–11

Nilüfer Belediyesi

- BVA Cup: (gold) 2011

Beşiktaş

- CEV Challenge Cup: (silver) 2013–14
- BVA Cup: (gold) 2013

Fenerbahçe

- FIVB Club World Championship: (bronze) 2021
- CEV Champions League: (bronze) 2015-16, 2018-19, 2021-22, 2022-23
- Turkish Women's Volleyball League: (gold) 2014-15, 2016-17, 2022-23 (silver) 2015–16, 2020-21, 2021-22 (bronze) 2017-18, 2018-19
- Turkish Cup: (gold) 2014-15, 2016-17, 2024-25 (silver) 2018-19, 2021-22, 2022-23
- Turkish Super Cup: (gold) 2015, 2022, 2024 (silver) 2014, 2017

Türk Hava Yolları

- CEV Cup: (silver) 2022–23
- Turkish Cup: (bronze) 2023–24

== See also ==
- Turkish women in sports
