= Cansu Özbay =

Turkish women's volleyball player (born 1996)

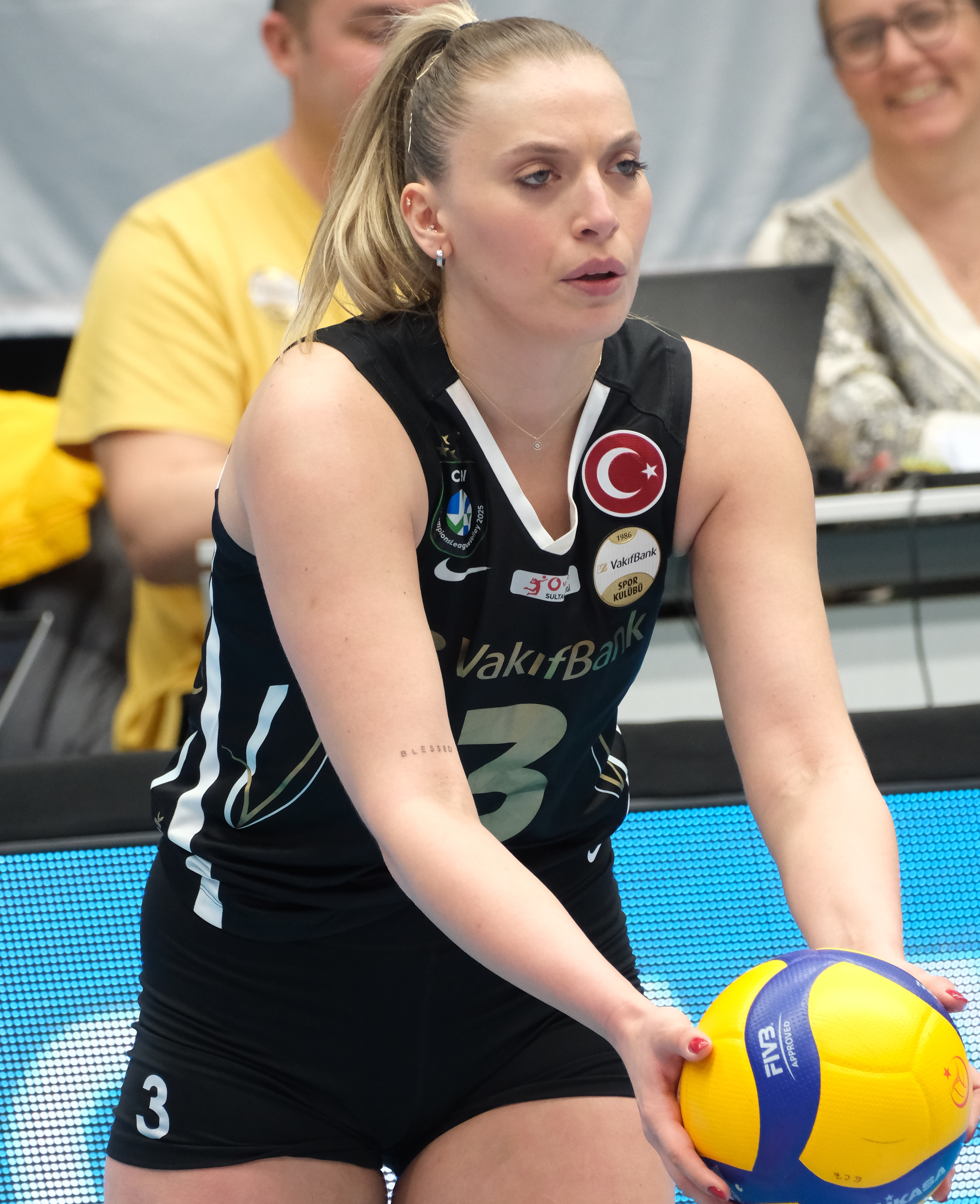
- Cansu Özbay for Vakıfbank Istanbul (April 2025)

Personal information
- Born: 17 October 1996 (age 30); İzmir, Turkey
- Height: 182 cm (6 ft 0 in)
- Spike: 285 cm (112 in)
- Block: 284 cm (112 in)

Volleyball information
- Position: Setter
- Current club: (Turkey) Vakıfbank Istanbul
- Number: 3

Career
| Years | Teams |
|---|---|
| 2012–2014 | Arkas Spor |
| 2014–2016 | Beşiktaş |
| 2015 | → Nilüfer Belediyespor (loan) |
| 2016– | Vakıfbank Istanbul |

National team
| 2013 | Turkey girls' U18 |
| 2015 | Turkey women's U20 |
| 2017– | Turkey |
Honours
Women's volleyball
Representing Turkey
FIVB World Championship
| Silver medal – second place | 2025 Thailand | Team |
FIVB Nations League
| Gold medal – first place | 2023 Arlington | Team |
| Gold medal – first place | 2026 Macau | Team |
| Silver medal – second place | 2018 Nanjing | Team |
| Bronze medal – third place | 2021 Rimini | Team |
European Championship
| Gold medal – first place | 2023 Belgium/Italy/Estonia/Germany | Team |
| Gold medal – first place | 2026 Azerbaijan/Czech Republic/Sweden/Turkey | Team |
| Silver medal – second place | 2019 Turkey | Team |
| Bronze medal – third place | 2017 Azerbaijan/Georgia | Team |
| Bronze medal – third place | 2021 Serbia/Bulgaria/Croatia/Romania | Team |

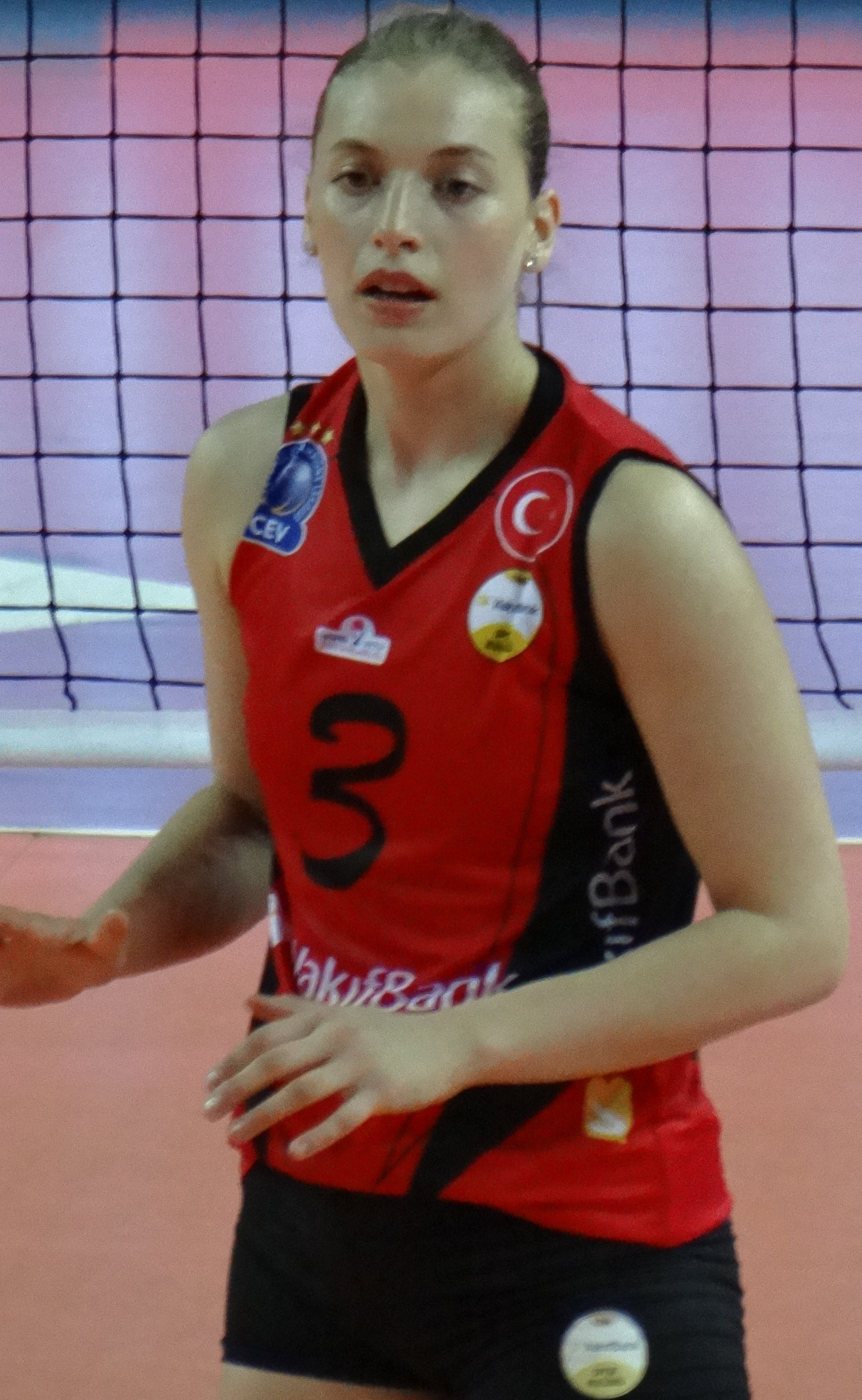
Cansu Özbay for Vakıfbank Istanbul (April 2025)

Cansu Özbay (Turkish pronunciation: [d͡ʒɑnsu ˈœzbɑj]; born 17 October 1996) is a Turkish professional volleyball player. She plays in the setter position. Currently, she plays for Vakıfbank Istanbul. She is a member of the Turkey women's national volleyball team.

== Playing career ==
=== Club ===
Cansu Özbay started her volleyball career in Göztepe than continued in the youth development team of Arkas Spor at her hometown in İzmir. She then transferred to the Istanbul-based club Beşiktaş .K. In January 2015, Özbay was loaned out from her club Beşiktaş JK to Nilüfer Belediyespor in Bursa, where she played the second half of the 2014–15 Turkish Women's Volleyball League season. At the end of the season, she returned to her relegated club to play in the 2015–16 Second League season. Her team finished the season as champion, and was promoted to the First League. For the 2016–17 League season, she was transferred by Vakıfbank Istanbul. She succeeded Naz Aydemir Akyol as setter in the team. She enjoyed her team's league champion title in the 2016–17 and 2017–18 League seasons. She was awarded the title of "Best Setter" of the 2017–18 season's final series.

Özbay participated at the 2016 FIVB Volleyball Women's Club World Championship held in Metro Manila, Philippines, where her team Vakıfbank Istanbul placed third. The next year, her team became champion of the 2017 FIVB Volleyball Women's Club World Championship in Kobe, Japan.

She won the 2024–25 Turkish Women's Volleyball League with VakıfBank, and was named MVP.

| Club | Years |
|---|---|
| (Turkey) Göztepe | 2011–2012 |
| (Turkey) Arkas Spor | 2012–2014 |
| (Turkey) Beşiktaş JK | 2014–2016 |
| (Turkey) Nilüfer BS | 2015 |
| (Turkey) Vakıfbank Istanbul | 2016– |

=== International ===
Özbay was part of the Turkey girls' U18 team at the 2013 CEV Youth Volleyball European Championship – Girls held in Serbia and at the 2013 FIVB Girls' U18 World Championship held in Thailand.

She was a member of the Turkey women's U20 team, and played at the 2015 FIVB Volleyball Women's U20 World Championship held in Puerto Rico.

She competed at the 2017 Women's European Volleyball Championship held in Azerbaijan and Georgia, where the Turkey women's team ranked third. She was part of the national team at the 2018 FIVB Volleyball Women's Nations League, which became silver medalist after losing to the United States in the final.

Cansu Özbay made her Olympic debut at the Tokyo 2021 Games.

Özbay was part of the squad that won both the 2023 FIVB Nations League and European Championship. She was named best Setter of the 2023 European Championship. She was also named to the Paris 2024 Olympics where the team finished fourth.

== Honours ==
=== Club ===
Champions (8)

- 2015–16 Turkish Women's Second Volleyball League (Beşiktaş JK),
- 2016–17 Turkish Women's Volleyball League (VakıfBank)
- 2017 FIVB Volleyball Women's Club World Championship (VakıfBank)
- 2017–18 Turkish Women's Volleyball League (VakıfBank)
- 2021 FIVB Club World Championship (VakıfBank)
- 2021–22 Turkish Women's Volleyball League (VakıfBank)
- 2021–22 CEV Women's Champions League (VakıfBank)
- 2024–25 Turkish Women's Volleyball League (VakıfBank)
- 2025–26 CEV Women's Champions League (VakıfBank)

Third places (2)

- 2016 FIVB Volleyball Women's Club World Championship (VakıfBank)
- 2019 FIVB Club World Championship (VakıfBank)

=== National team ===
- 2017 Women's European Volleyball Championship - Bronze Medal
- 2018 FIVB Women's Volleyball Nations League - Silver Medal
- 2019 Women's European Volleyball Championship - Silver Medal
- 2021 FIVB Women's Volleyball Nations League - Bronze Medal
- 2021 Women's European Volleyball Championship - Bronze Medal
- 2023 FIVB Volleyball Women's Nations League - Gold Medal
- 2023 Women's European Volleyball Championship – Gold Medal
- 2025 FIVB Women's Volleyball World Championship - Silver Medal
- 2026 FIVB Women's Volleyball Nations League - Gold Medal
- 2026 Women's European Volleyball Championship - Gold medal

=== Individual ===
Best Setter (2)

- 2017–18 Turkish Women's Volleyball League Final series (VakıfBank)
- 2018 FIVB Nations League (Turkey National Team)

Most Valuable Player (2)

- 2020 Turkish Super Cup Final series (VakıfBank),
- 2024–25 Turkish Women's Volleyball League (VakıfBank)

Awards
| Preceded by - | Best Setter of FIVB Nations League; 2018 | Succeeded by (Brazil) Macris Carneiro |
