= Polen Uslupehlivan =

Turkish volleyball player (born 1990)

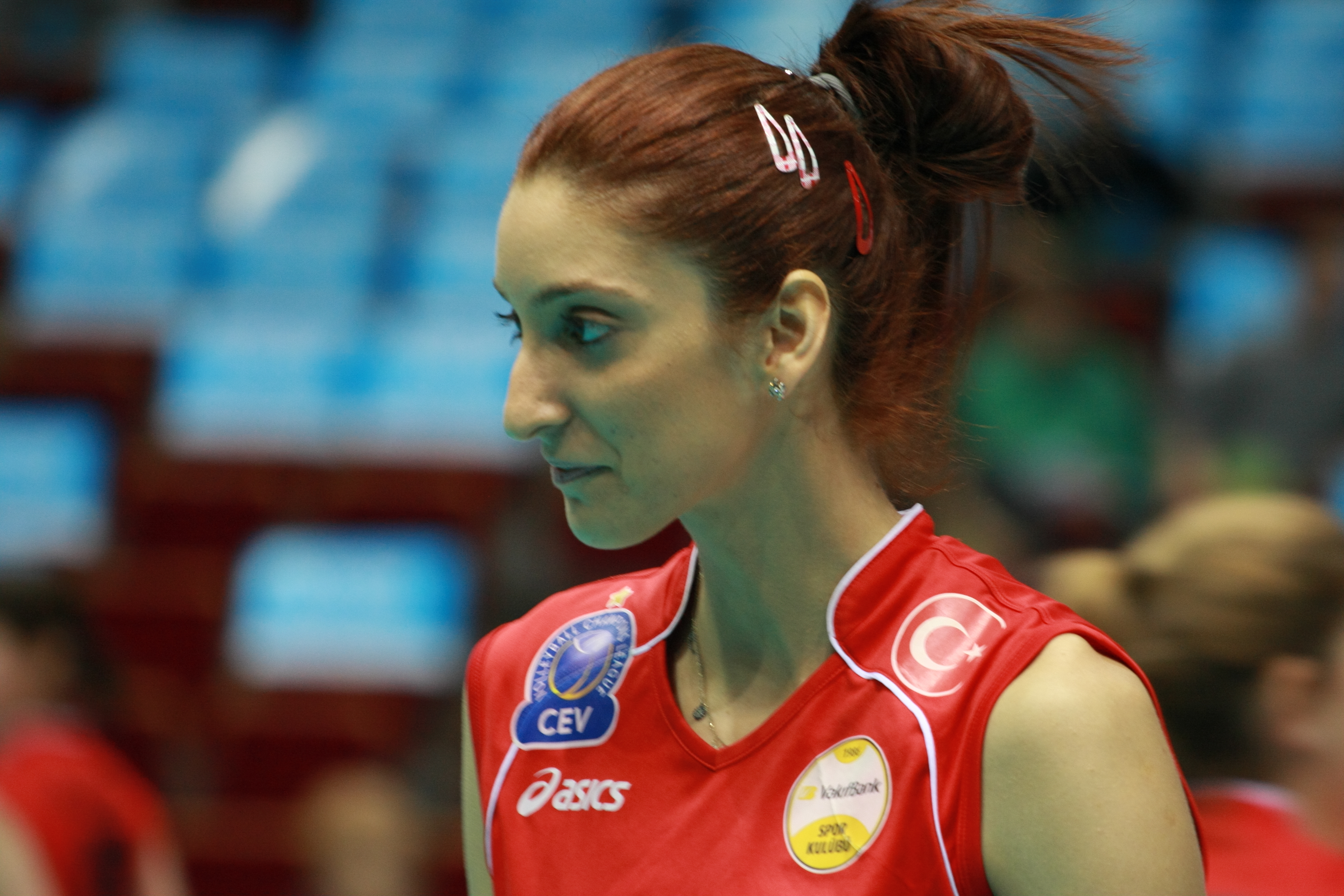

Personal information
- Nationality: Turkish
- Born: 27 August 1990 (age 36); Adana, Turkey
- Height: 1.93 m (6 ft 4 in)
- Weight: 65 kg (143 lb)
- Spike: 311 cm (122 in)
- Block: 301 cm (119 in)

Volleyball information
- Position: Opposite
- Current club: Fenerbahçe Istanbul
- Number: 6

Career
Years	Teams
2008–2010; 2010–2012; 2012–2014; 2014–2018; 2019–2020; 2020–	Vakıfbank S.K. Nilüfer Belediyespor; Vakıfbank Istanbul; Fenerbahçe Istanbul; PTT; Türk Hava Yolları

National team
Turkey
Honours
Women's volleyball
Representing Turkey
European Games
Gold medal – first place	2015 Baku	Team
European Championship
Bronze medal – third place	2011 Italy/Serbia
Bronze medal – third place	2017 Azerbaijan/Georgia
Women's European Volleyball League
Gold medal – first place	2014 Germany/Turkey	Team
Silver medal – second place	2011 Istanbul

Polen Uslupehlivan (born 27 August 1990) is a Turkish volleyball player of Fenerbahçe Istanbul and member of the Turkish national team.

== Career ==
She played for Nilüfer Belediyespor. Uslupehlivan won the gold medal at the 2013 Club World Championship playing with Vakıfbank Istanbul. Now, she plays for Fenerbahçe. She was part of the Turkish team that competed at the 2012 Summer Olympics.

== Awards ==
=== National team ===
- 2011 European League - Silver
- 2011 European Championship - Bronze
- 2012 FIVB World Grand Prix - Bronze
- 2014 Women's European Volleyball League - Gold
- 2015 Montreux Volley Masters - Gold
- 2015 European Games - Gold

=== Clubs ===
- 2012-13 Turkish Cup - Champion, with Vakıfbank Spor Kulübü
- 2012–13 CEV Champions League - Champion, with Vakıfbank Spor Kulübü
- 2012-13 Turkish Women's Volleyball League - Champion, with Vakıfbank Spor Kulübü
- 2013 Club World Championship - Champion, with Vakıfbank Istanbul
- 2013-14 Turkish Women's Volleyball League - Champion, with Vakıfbank Spor Kulübü
- 2014 Turkish Super Cup - Runner-Up, with Fenerbahçe Grundig
- 2014-15 Turkish Cup - Champion, with Fenerbahçe Grundig
- 2014–15 Turkish Women's Volleyball League - Champion, with Fenerbahçe Grundig
- 2014-15 Turkish Super Cup - Champion, with Fenerbahçe Grundig
- 2016–17 Turkish Volleyball Cup Champion, with Fenerbahçe Grunding
- 2016–17 Turkish Women's Volleyball League Champion, with Fenerbahçe Grunding

== See also ==
- Turkish women in sports
