= Buse Kayacan =

Turkish volleyball player

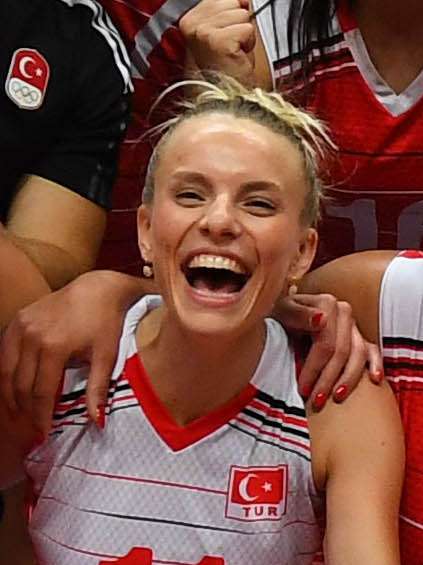
- Buse Kayacan in 2021

Personal information
- Nationality: Turkish
- Born: 15 July 1992 (age 34)
- Height: 176 cm (5 ft 9 in)
- Weight: 60 kg (132 lb)
- Spike: 275 cm (108 in)
- Block: 270 cm (106 in)

Volleyball information
- Position: Libero
- Current club: (Turkey) Türk Hava Yolları
- Number: 2

Career
Years	Teams
2010-2011; 2011-2014; 2014-2015; 2015-2016; 2016-2017; 2017-2019; 2019-?	(Turkey) DYO Karşıyaka (Turkey) Eczacıbaşı VitrA (Turkey) Nilüfer Belediyespor (Turkey) Bursa Büyükşehir Belediyespor (Turkey) Çanakkale Belediye (Turkey) Galatasaray S.K. (Turkey) Nilüfer Belediyespor
Honours
Women's volleyball
Representing Turkey
Islamic Solidarity Games
Gold medal – first place	2021 Konya	Team

Buse Kayacan (born 15 July 1992) is a Turkish volleyball player, a member of the club Nilüfer Belediyespor.

== Sporting achievements ==
=== Clubs ===
Turkish Super Cup:

- 2011, 2012

Turkish Cup:

- 2012

Turkish Championship:

- 2012
- 2013
- 2014

=== National team ===
European League:

- 2015
