= Fulden Ural =

Turkish volleyball player (born 1991)

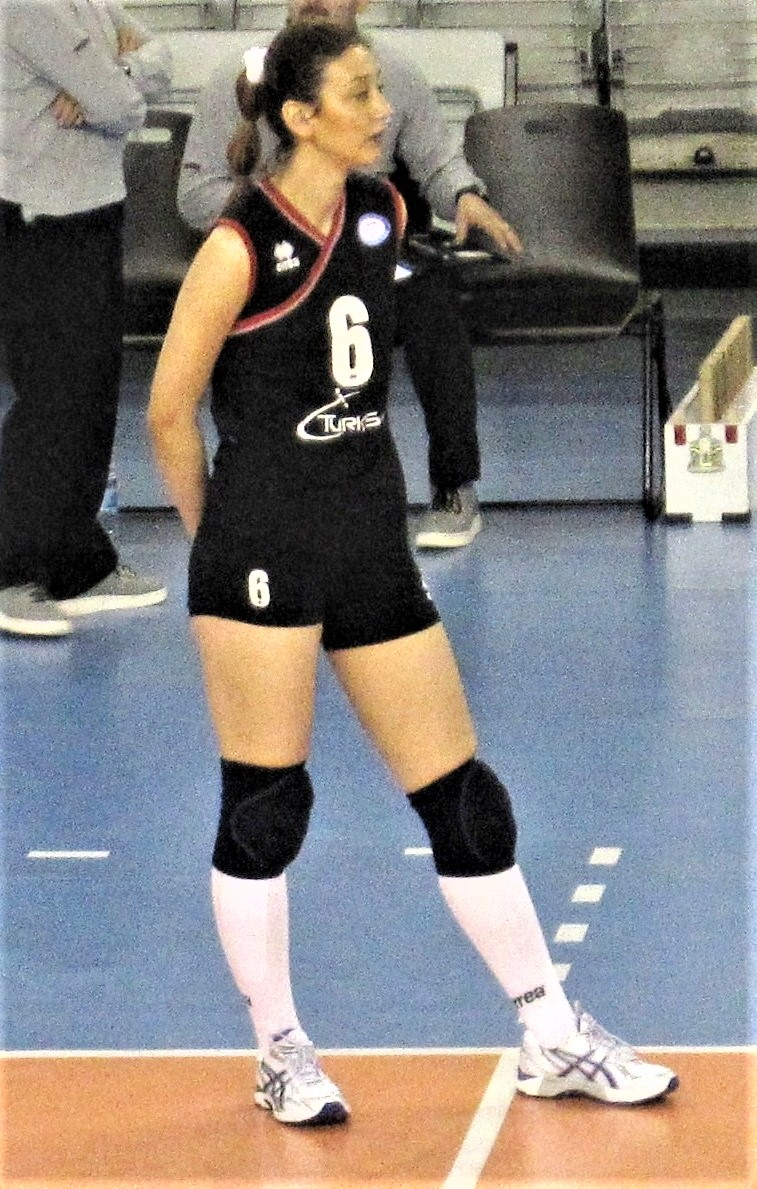

Personal information
- Born: 3 January 1991 (age 35); Ankara, Turkey
- Height: 1.86 m (6 ft 1 in)
- Weight: 76 kg (168 lb)
- Spike: 310 cm (120 in)
- Block: 305 cm (120 in)

Volleyball information
- Position: Wing-spiker
- Current club: (Turkey) Beşiktaş Ceylan

Career
| Years | Teams |
|---|---|
| 2007–2008 | İller Bankası |
| 2008–2009 | MKE Ankaragücü |
| 2009–2010 | Dicle Üniversitesi |
| 2010–2011 | Ankara SGK |
| 2011–2012 | Gazi Üniversitesi |
| 2012–2015 | Trabzon İdmanocağı |
| 2015–2016 | Bolu Belediyespor |
| 2016–2019 | Halkbank Ankara |
| 2019 | Aydın Büyükşehir Belediyespor |
| 2019–2020 | Beşiktaş JK |
| 2020 | Karayolları Spor Kulübü |
| 2020–2021 | Nilüfer Belediyespor |
| 2021–2022 | Kuzeyboru |
| 2022 | Nilüfer Belediyespor |
| 2022–2023 | Galatasaray |
| 2023– | Beşiktaş Ceylan |
| 2024 | Kathmandu Spikers |

National team
| 2018– | Turkey |

Fulden Ural (born 3 January 1991) is a Turkish women's volleyball player. She is 186 cm (6.10 ft) tall at 76 kg (168 lb) and plays at the wing spiker position. She is a member of the Turkey women's national volleyball team.

== Playing career ==
=== Club ===
| Club | From | To |
|---|---|---|
| (Turkey) İller Bankası Ankara | | 2007–2008 |
| (Turkey) MKE Ankaragücü | 2008–2009 | 2008–2009 |
| (Turkey) Dicle University Diyarbakırspor | 2009–2010 | 2009–2010 |
| (Turkey) Ankara SGK | 2010–2011 | 2010–2011 |
| (Turkey) Gazi Üniversity | 2011–2012 | 2011–2012 |
| (Turkey) Trabzon İdmanocağı | 2012–2013 | 2014–2015 |
| (Turkey) Bolu Belediyespor | 2015 | 2015 |
| (Turkey) Samsun 19 Mayıs | 2016 | 2016 |
| (Turkey) Halkbank Ankara | 2016–2017 | 2018–2019 |

Ural began playing volleyball in the youth development section of İller Bankası Ankara. She then played in the clubs MKE Ankaragücü, Dicle University Diyarbakırspor, Ankara SGK, Gazi Üniversity, Trabzon İdmanocağı, Bolu belediyespor, and Samsun 19 Mayıs, before she joined Halkbank Ankara for the 2016–2017 season of the Turkish Women's Volleyball League.

She signed a one-year deal with Galatasaray on 12 August 2022.

=== International ===
Ural is a member of the Turkey women's national volleyball team, She takes part at the 2018 FIVB Volleyball Women's Nations League for Turkey.
