= Kübra Kegan =

Turkish volleyball player (born 1995)

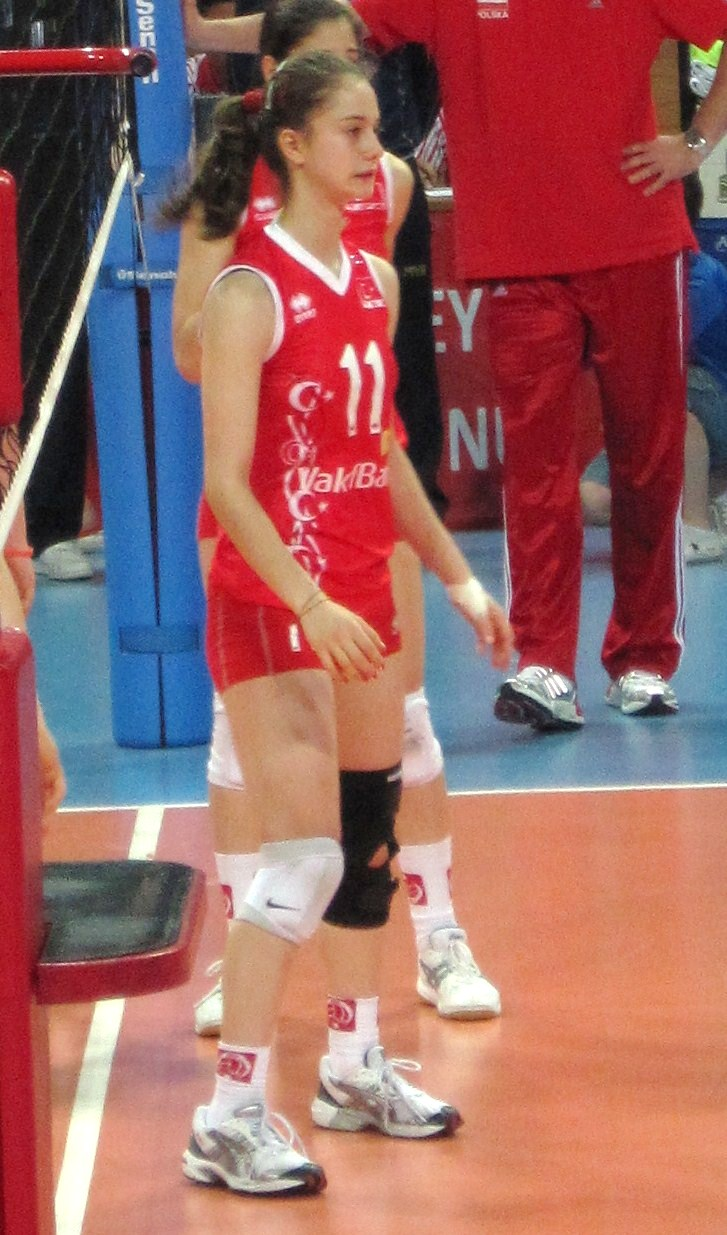

Personal information
- Born: July 18, 1995 (age 31); Ankara, Turkey
- Height: 1.78 m (5 ft 10 in)
- Weight: 58 kg (128 lb)
- Spike: 281 cm (111 in)
- Block: 271 cm (107 in)

Volleyball information
- Position: Setter
- Current club: İdmanocağı
- Number: 11

Career
Years	Teams
2008-2009; 2009-2011; 2011-2012; 2012-2014; 2014-2015; 2015; 2015-2016; 2016-	(Turkey) Tarımspor Ankara (Turkey) TVF Sport High School (Turkey) MKE Ankaragücü (Turkey) Karayolları Ankara (Turkey) Halkbank (Turkey) Eczacıbaşı (Turkey) Balıkesir B.Şehir Bld (Turkey) İdmanocağı

National team
2011-	Turkey
Honours
Women's volleyball
Representing Turkey women's youth national volleyball team
Women's Junior European Championship
Gold medal – first place	2012 Ankara	Team
Girls Youth World Championship
Gold medal – first place	2011 Ankara	Team

Kübra Kegan (born July 18, 1995 in Ankara, Turkey) is a Turkish volleyball player. She is 178 cm (5.84 ft) tall at 58 kg (128 lb) and plays in the setter position. Kegan is a member of the Turkey women's youth national volleyball team, and wears number 11.

== Clubs ==
- (Turkey) Tarımspor Ankara (2008-2009)
- (Turkey) TVF Sport High School (2009-2011)
- (Turkey) MKE Ankaragücü (2011-2012)
- (Turkey) Karayolları Ankara (2012-2014)
- (Turkey) Halkbank (2014-2015)
- (Turkey) Eczacıbaşı (2015)
- (Turkey) Balıkesir B.Şehir Bld (2015-2016)
- (Turkey) İdmanocağı(2016–present)

== Awards ==
=== National team ===
- 2011 FIVB Girls Youth World Championship - Gold
- 2012 Women's Junior European Volleyball Championship - Gold

== See also ==
- Turkish women in sports
