= Merve Dalbeler =

Turkish volleyball player (born 1987)

Personal information
- Full name: Seniye Merve Dalbeler
- Nationality: Turkish
- Born: 27 June 1987 (age 39)
- Height: 183 cm (6 ft 0 in)
- Weight: 60 kg (132 lb)
- Spike: 280 cm (110 in)
- Block: 270 cm (106 in)

Volleyball information
- Position: Libero / Outside hitter
- Current club: Fenerbahçe
- Number: 2

Career
Years	Teams
2007–2008; 2008–2009; 2009–2010; 2010–2011; 2011–2019	Haznedar; Eczacıbaşı Zenitiva; Yeşilyurt; Galatasaray Medical Park; Fenerbahçe

National team
Turkey
Honours
Women's volleyball
Representing Turkey
European Championship
Bronze medal – third place	2017 Azerbaijan/Georgia

Seniye Merve Dalbeler (born 27 June 1987) is a Turkish volleyball player. She is 183 cm and plays as outside hitter. Since 2011 she plays for Turkish club Fenerbahçe.

== Career ==
Dalbeler played for Fenerbahçe in the 2012 FIVB Club World Championship held in Doha, Qatar and helped her team to win the bronze medal after defeating Puerto Rico's Lancheras de Cataño 3-0.

== Awards ==
=== Clubs ===
- 2011-12 CEV Champions League - Champion, with Fenerbahçe Women's Volleyball
- 2011 Turkish Super Cup - Runner-up, with Fenerbahçe Universal
- 2012 FIVB World Club Championship – 3rd place, with Fenerbahçe
- 2012-13 CEV Cup - Runner-up, with Fenerbahçe
- 2013-14 CEV Cup - Champion, with Fenerbahçe
- 2013–14 Turkish Women's Volleyball League - Runner-up, with Fenerbahçe
- 2013-14 Turkish Cup - Runner-up, with Fenerbahçe
- 2014 Turkish Super Cup - Runner-up, with Fenerbahçe Grundig
- 2014-15 Turkish Cup - Champion, with Fenerbahçe Grundig
- 2014–15 Turkish Women's Volleyball League - Champion, with Fenerbahçe Grundig
- 2014–15 Turkish Super Cup - Champion, with Fenerbahçe Grundig
- 2016–17 Turkish Volleyball Cup Champion, with Fenerbahçe Grundig
- 2016–17 Turkish Volleyball League Champion, with Fenerbahçe Grundig

== See also ==
- Turkish women in sports
