= 2017–18 Turkish Women's Volleyball League =

- League: Turkish Women's Volleyball League
- Sport: Volleyball
- Teams: 12

Regular Season

Finals
- Champions: VakıfBank Istanbul
- Runners-up: Eczacıbaşı VitrA
- Finals MVP: (China) Zhu Ting

Turkish Women's Volleyball League seasons
- ← 2016–17 2018–19 →

The 2017–18 Turkish Women's Volleyball League is the 35th edition of the top-flight professional women's volleyball league in Turkey.

== League table ==
| Pos | Team | Pld | W | L | Pts | SW | SL | SR | SPW | SPL | SPR | Qualification |
|---|---|---|---|---|---|---|---|---|---|---|---|---|
| 1 | Eczacıbaşı VitrA | 22 | 21 | 1 | 62.71 | 65 | 15 | 4.333 | 1909 | 1475 | 1.294 | Play-offs |
| 2 | VakıfBank | 22 | 19 | 3 | 57.415 | 58 | 19 | 3.053 | 1829 | 1486 | 1.231 | Play-offs |
| 3 | Galatasaray | 22 | 16 | 6 | 48.085 | 55 | 31 | 1.774 | 1947 | 1763 | 1.104 | Play-offs |
| 4 | Fenerbahçe | 22 | 16 | 6 | 46.845 | 52 | 30 | 1.733 | 1873 | 1723 | 1.087 | Play-offs |
| 5 | Bursa BŞB | 22 | 12 | 10 | 42.2 | 49 | 33 | 1.485 | 1845 | 1766 | 1.045 | Play-offs |
| 6 | Halkbank | 22 | 9 | 13 | 30.65 | 35 | 46 | 0.761 | 1713 | 1751 | 0.978 | Play-offs |
| 7 | Beşiktaş | 22 | 9 | 13 | 30.155 | 39 | 45 | 0.867 | 1833 | 1865 | 0.983 | Play-offs |
| 8 | Nilüfer Belediye | 22 | 9 | 13 | 26.44 | 35 | 49 | 0.714 | 1744 | 1876 | 0.930 | Play-offs |
| 9 | Seramiksan | 22 | 8 | 14 | 25.335 | 36 | 51 | 0.706 | 1803 | 1942 | 0.928 | Play-outs |
| 10 | Beylikdüzü | 22 | 8 | 14 | 25 | 38 | 51 | 0.745 | 1847 | 1965 | 0.940 | Play-outs |
| 11 | Çanakkale Belediye | 22 | 5 | 17 | 14.6 | 26 | 59 | 0.441 | 1723 | 1975 | 0.872 | Play-outs |
| 12 | İlbank | 22 | 0 | 22 | 4.31 | 7 | 66 | 0.106 | 1299 | 1778 | 0.731 | Play-outs |

Source: Sultanlar Ligi

=== Results ===
| Team | FEN | VAK | ECZ | GAL | BUR | BEŞ | HAL | ÇAN | NİL | BEY | SER | ILB |
|---|---|---|---|---|---|---|---|---|---|---|---|---|
| Fenerbahçe | | 0–3 | 3–2 | 3–0 | 3–1 | 3–0 | 3–1 | 3–0 | 3–0 | 3–1 | 3–0 | 3–0 |
| VakıfBank | 3–1 | | 0–3 | 3–0 | 3–0 | 3–0 | 3–0 | 3–0 | 3–2 | 3–2 | 3–0 | 3–0 |
| Eczacıbaşı | 3–1 | 3–0 | | 3–1 | 3–0 | 3–1 | 3–0 | 3–0 | 3–0 | 3–0 | 3–0 | 3–1 |
| Galatasaray | 1–3 | 0–3 | 1–3 | | 3–1 | 2–3 | 3–2 | 3–0 | 3–0 | 3–0 | 3–1 | 3–0 |
| Bursa BŞB | 1–3 | 0–3 | 2–3 | 1–3 | | 3–0 | 3–0 | 3–0 | 2–3 | 3–1 | 3–1 | 3–0 |
| Beşiktaş | 2–3 | 0–3 | 1–3 | 2–3 | 0–3 | | 3–0 | 3–1 | 3–0 | 2–3 | 3–0 | 3–0 |
| Halkbank | 3–1 | 0–3 | 2–3 | 2–3 | 0–3 | 3–1 | | 3–0 | 2–3 | 3–1 | 3–0 | 3–0 |
| Çanakkale | 1–3 | 1–3 | 0–3 | 2–3 | 0–3 | 3–2 | 1–3 | | 1–3 | 3–2 | 2–3 | 3–0 |
| Nilüfer | 1–3 | 2–3 | 0–3 | 1–3 | 0–3 | 3–0 | 1–3 | 3–0 | | 3–0 | 2–3 | 1–3 |
| Beylikduzu | 1–3 | 1–3 | 0–3 | 0–3 | 3–2 | 2–3 | 3–0 | 3–2 | 3–1 | | 2–3 | 3–0 |
| Seramiksan | 3–0 | 0–3 | 1–3 | 1–3 | 3–2 | 1–3 | 3–1 | 2–3 | 2–3 | 2–3 | | 3–0 |
| Ilbank | 0–3 | 0–3 | 1–3 | 0–3 | 0–3 | 0–3 | 2–3 | 2–3 | 0–3 | 0–3 | 0–3 | |

Legend: Blue = left column team win; Yellow = draw; Red = top row team win.

=== Head-to-Head results ===
| Team | FEN | VAK | ECZ | GAL | BUR | BEŞ | HAL | ÇAN | NİL | BEY | SER | ILB |
|---|---|---|---|---|---|---|---|---|---|---|---|---|
| Fenerbahçe | | 0–1 | 1–0 | 1–0 | 2–0 | 2–0 | 1–1 | 1–0 | 1–0 | 2–0 | 1–0 | 1–0 |
| VakıfBank | 1–0 | | 0–1 | 2–0 | 1–0 | 1–0 | 2–0 | 1–0 | 1–0 | 2–0 | 1–0 | 1–0 |
| Eczacıbaşı VitrA | 0–1 | 1–0 | | 2–0 | 1–0 | 2–0 | 1–0 | 1–0 | 1–0 | 2–0 | 1–0 | 2–0 |
| Galatasaray Daikin | 0–1 | 0–2 | 0–2 | | 1–0 | 1–0 | 1–0 | 1–0 | 2–0 | 1–0 | 1–0 | 1–0 |
| Bursa BŞB | 0–2 | 0–1 | 0–1 | 0–1 | | 1–0 | 1–0 | 2–0 | 0–1 | 0–1 | 1–1 | 1–0 |
| Beşiktaş | 0–1 | 0–2 | 0–2 | 0–1 | 0–1 | | 1–0 | 0–1 | 0–1 | 1–0 | 1–0 | 2–0 |
| Halkbank | 1–1 | 0–2 | 0–1 | 0–1 | 0–1 | 0–1 | | 1–0 | 1–0 | 1–0 | 1–1 | 1–0 |
| Çanakkale Bld | 0–1 | 0–1 | 0–1 | 0–1 | 0–2 | 1–0 | 0–1 | | 0–2 | 1–0 | 1–1 | 1–0 |
| Nilüfer Bld | 0–1 | 0–1 | 0–1 | 0–2 | 1–0 | 1–0 | 0–1 | 2–0 | | 0–1 | 0–1 | 1–0 |
| Beylikduzu | 0–2 | 0–2 | 0–2 | 0–1 | 1–0 | 0–1 | 0–1 | 0–1 | 1–0 | | 0–1 | 1–0 |
| Seramiksan | 0–1 | 0–1 | 0–1 | 0–1 | 1–1 | 0–1 | 1–1 | 1–1 | 0–1 | 0–1 | | 1–0 |
| Ilbank | 0–1 | 0–1 | 0–1 | 0–2 | 0–1 | 0–2 | 0–1 | 0–1 | 0–2 | 0–1 | 0–1 | |

Legend: Blue = left column team win; Yellow = draw; Red = top row team win.

== Statistic ==
Wing-Spiker
| Rank | Player | Club | % |
|---|---|---|---|
| 1 | (Cuba) Wilma Salas | Halkbank | 0.2555 |
| 2 | (Russia) Tatiana Kosheleva | Galatasaray | 0.25468 |
| 3 | (Croatia) Mia Jerkov | Fenerbahçe | 0.25015 |
| 4 | (Netherlands) Anne Buijs | Nilüfer Bld | 0.24453 |
| 5 | (Brazil) Natália Pereira | Fenerbahçe | 0.24209 |

Opposite
| Rank | Player | Club | % |
|---|---|---|---|
| 1 | (Azerbaijan) Polina Rahimova | Fenerbahçe | 0.56192 |
| 2 | (Serbia) Tijana Bošković | Eczacıbaşı VitrA | 0.51024 |
| 3 | (Turkey) Neslihan Demir | Galatasaray | 0.50401 |
| 4 | (Ukraine) Alesia Rykhliuk | Halkbank | 0.48775 |
| 5 | (Bulgaria) Emillya Dimitrova | Bursa BŞB | 0.48483 |

Middle-Blocker
| Rank | Player | Club | % |
|---|---|---|---|
| 1 | (Turkey) Eda Erdem Dündar | Fenerbahçe | 0.70084 |
| 2 | (Brazil) Ana Carolina da Silva | Nilüfer Bld | 0.62353 |
| 3 | (Serbia) Milena Rašić | Vakıfbank | 0.61551 |
| 4 | (Turkey) Büşra Kılıçlı | Eczacıbaşı VitrA | 0.60542 |
| 5 | (Poland) Maja Tokarska | Beşiktaş | 0.57462 |

Setter
| Rank | Player | Club | % |
|---|---|---|---|
| 1 | (Turkey) Ezgi Dilik | Eczacıbaşı VitrA | 46.80 |
| 2 | (Turkey) Cansu Özbay | VakıfBank | 35.71 |
| 3 | (Serbia) Maja Ognjenović | Eczacıbaşı VitrA | 34.32 |
| 4 | (Turkey) Nilay Karaağaç | Bursa BŞB | 36.20 |
| 5 | (Turkey) Naz Aydemir | VakıfBank | 35.71 |

Libero
| Rank | Player | Club | % |
|---|---|---|---|
| 1 | (Turkey) Derya Çayırgan | Halkbank | 0.3034 |
| 2 | (Turkey) Aylin Sarıoğlu | Bursa BŞB | 0.30338 |
| 3 | (Turkey) Gizem Örge | Vakıfbank | 0.30335 |
| 4 | (Turkey) Buse Kayacan | Galatasaray | 0.30335 |
| 5 | (Turkey) Pinar Eren | Beşiktaş | 0.30329 |

== Results ==
=== Week 1 ===
| Date | Time | | Score | | Set 1 | Set 2 | Set 3 | Set 4 | Set 5 | Total | Report |
|---|---|---|---|---|---|---|---|---|---|---|---|
| 17 Oct | 17:00 | Halkbank | 0–3 | VakıfBank | 20–25 | 13–25 | 20–25 | – | – | 53–75 | Report |
| 18 Oct | 14:00 | Beşiktaş | 3–0 | Ilbank | 25–14 | 25–18 | 25–18 | – | – | 75–50 | Report |
| 18 Oct | 17:00 | Çanakkale Bld | 2–3 | Seramiksan | 26–28 | 21–25 | 25–22 | 25–15 | 12–15 | 109–105 | Report |
| 18 Oct | 17:00 | Beylikduzu | 0–3 | Eczacıbaşı VitrA | 11–25 | 18–25 | 14–25 | – | – | 43–75 | Report |
| 18 Oct | 17:30 | Galatasaray Daikin | 3–0 | Nilüfer Bld | 25–17 | 25–23 | 25–16 | – | – | 75–56 | Report |
| 18 Oct | 18:00 | Bursa BŞB | 1–3 | Fenerbahçe | 26–28 | 25–19 | 20–25 | 23–25 | | 94–97 | Report |

=== Week 2 ===
| Date | Time | | Score | | Set 1 | Set 2 | Set 3 | Set 4 | Set 5 | Total | Report |
|---|---|---|---|---|---|---|---|---|---|---|---|
| 21 Oct | 14:00 | Nilüfer Bld | 3–0 | Çanakkale Bld | 25–14 | 25–20 | 25–16 | – | – | 75–50 | Report |
| 21 Oct | 15:00 | Ilbank | 0–3 | Galatasaray Daikin | 20–25 | 22–25 | 18–25 | – | – | 60–75 | Report |
| 21 Oct | 16:00 | Eczacıbaşı VitrA | 3–1 | Beşiktaş | 27–25 | 25–14 | 22–25 | 25–23 | – | 99–87 | Report |
| 21 Oct | 16:00 | Fenerbahçe | 3–1 | Halkbank | 25–18 | 25–19 | 21–25 | 25–20 | – | 96–82 | Report |
| 21 Oct | 16:30 | Seramiksan | 3–2 | Bursa BŞB | 23–25 | 25–22 | 25–23 | 20–25 | 15–13 | 108–108 | Report |
| 21 Oct | 17:00 | VakıfBank | 3–2 | Beylikduzu | 25–16 | 25–16 | 23–25 | 13–25 | 15–9 | 101–91 | Report |

=== Week 3 ===
| Date | Time | | Score | | Set 1 | Set 2 | Set 3 | Set 4 | Set 5 | Total | Report |
|---|---|---|---|---|---|---|---|---|---|---|---|
| 24 Oct | 17:00 | Çanakkale Bld | 0–3 | Bursa BŞB | 22–25 | 23–25 | 21–25 | – | – | 66–75 | Report |
| 24 Oct | 17:30 | Halkbank | 3–0 | Seramiksan | 25–14 | 25–17 | 25–19 | – | – | 75–50 | Report |
| 24 Oct | 17:30 | Nilüfer Bld | 3–1 | Ilbank | 25–21 | 22–25 | 25–23 | 26–24 | – | 98–93 | Report |
| 24 Oct | 18:30 | Galatasaray Daikin | 1–3 | Eczacıbaşı VitrA | 23–25 | 25–22 | 16–25 | 19–25 | – | 83–97 | Report |
| 25 Oct | 14:00 | Beşiktaş | 0–3 | VakıfBank | 18–25 | 18–25 | 14–25 | – | – | 50–75 | Report |
| 25 Oct | 18:30 | Beylikduzu | 1–3 | Fenerbahçe | 14–25 | 18–25 | 28–26 | 21–25 | – | 81–101 | Report |

=== Week 4 ===
| Date | Time | | Score | | Set 1 | Set 2 | Set 3 | Set 4 | Set 5 | Total | Report |
|---|---|---|---|---|---|---|---|---|---|---|---|
| 28 Oct | 14:00 | Bursa BŞB | 3–0 | Halkbank | 25–20 | 29–27 | 25–22 | – | – | 79–69 | Report |
| 28 Oct | 15:00 | Ilbank | 2–3 | Çanakkale Bld | 25–20 | 21–25 | 25–23 | 22–25 | 14–16 | 107–109 | Report |
| 28 Oct | 15:00 | VakıfBank | 3–0 | Galatasaray Daikin | 25–19 | 25–15 | 25-18 | – | – | 75–34 | Report |
| 28 Oct | 16:00 | Fenerbahçe | 3–0 | Beşiktaş | 25–20 | 25–19 | 25–15 | – | – | 75–54 | Report |
| 28 Oct | 16:30 | Seramiksan | 2–3 | Beylikduzu | 27–25 | 20–25 | 20–25 | 25–21 | 9–15 | 101–111 | Report |
| 28 Oct | 17:30 | Eczacıbaşı VitrA | 3–0 | Nilüfer Bld | 25–19 | 25–15 | 25–20 | – | – | 75–54 | Report |

=== Week 5 ===
| Date | Time | | Score | | Set 1 | Set 2 | Set 3 | Set 4 | Set 5 | Total | Report |
|---|---|---|---|---|---|---|---|---|---|---|---|
| 31 Oct | 14:00 | Beşiktaş | 3–0 | Seramiksan | 25–21 | 25–11 | 25–21 | – | – | 75–53 | Report |
| 31 Oct | 17:00 | Beylikduzu | 3–2 | Bursa BŞB | 12–25 | 25–21 | 13–25 | 25–21 | 15–10 | 90–102 | Report |
| 31 Oct | 17:00 | Çanakkale Bld | 1–3 | Halkbank | 17–25 | 25–27 | 25–22 | 16–25 | – | 83–99 | Report |
| 31 Oct | 17:00 | Ilbank | 1–3 | Eczacıbaşı VitrA | 25–21 | 13–25 | 23–25 | 10–25 | – | 71–96 | Report |
| 31 Oct | 18:00 | Nilüfer Bld | 2–3 | VakıfBank | 18–25 | 21–25 | 25–23 | 25–22 | 8–15 | 97–110 | Report |
| 01 Nov | 19:00 | Galatasaray Daikin | 1–3 | Fenerbahçe | 18–25 | 25–17 | 14–25 | 23–25 | – | 80–92 | Report |

=== Week 6 ===
| Date | Time | | Score | | Set 1 | Set 2 | Set 3 | Set 4 | Set 5 | Total | Report |
|---|---|---|---|---|---|---|---|---|---|---|---|
| 04 Nov | 15:00 | Fenerbahçe | 3–0 | Nilüfer Bld | 25–20 | 25–18 | 25–14 | – | – | 75–52 | Report |
| 04 Nov | 15:00 | Seramiksan | 1–3 | Galatasaray Daikin | 19–25 | 20–25 | 25–18 | 16–25 | – | 80–93 | Report |
| 04 Nov | 17:00 | Halkbank | 3–1 | Beylikduzu | 25–15 | 25–27 | 25–15 | 25–14 | – | 100–71 | Report |
| 04 Nov | 17:00 | VakıfBank | 3–0 | Ilbank | 25–18 | 25–7 | 25–15 | – | – | 75–40 | Report |
| 04 Nov | 17:30 | Bursa BŞB | 3–0 | Beşiktaş | 25–14 | 25–19 | 25–18 | – | – | 75–51 | Report |
| 04 Nov | 17:30 | Eczacıbaşı VitrA | 3–0 | Çanakkale Bld | 25–8 | 25–15 | 25–19 | – | – | 75–42 | Report |

=== Week 7 ===
| Date | Time | | Score | | Set 1 | Set 2 | Set 3 | Set 4 | Set 5 | Total | Report |
|---|---|---|---|---|---|---|---|---|---|---|---|
| 11 Nov | 14:00 | Beşiktaş | 3–0 | Halkbank | 25–20 | 25–22 | 25–22 | – | – | 75–64 | Report |
| 11 Nov | 14:00 | Galatasaray Daikin | 3–1 | Bursa BŞB | 25–22 | 25–20 | 22–25 | 25–15 | – | 97–82 | Report |
| 11 Nov | 17:00 | Çanakkale Bld | 3–2 | Beylikduzu | 28–26 | 25–16 | 12–25 | 21–25 | 15–10 | 101–102 | Report |
| 11 Nov | 17:00 | Ilbank | 0–3 | Fenerbahçe | 16–25 | 11–25 | 21–25 | – | – | 48–75 | Report |
| 11 Nov | 17:30 | Nilüfer Bld | 2–3 | Seramiksan | 25–21 | 14–25 | 25–16 | 19–25 | 9–15 | 92–102 | Report |
| 14 Nov | 18:00 | Eczacıbaşı VitrA | 3–0 | VakıfBank | 25–23 | 25–22 | 25–9 | – | – | 75–54 | Report |

=== Week 8 ===
| Date | Time | | Score | | Set 1 | Set 2 | Set 3 | Set 4 | Set 5 | Total | Report |
|---|---|---|---|---|---|---|---|---|---|---|---|
| 18 Nov | 14:00 | Halkbank | 2–3 | Galatasaray Daikin | 20–25 | 25–22 | 25–20 | 13–25 | 6–15 | 89–107 | Report |
| 18 Nov | 15:00 | Fenerbahçe | 3–2 | Eczacıbaşı VitrA | 25–23 | 25–20 | 28–30 | 17–25 | 15–11 | 110–109 | Report |
| 18 Nov | 16:00 | Beylikduzu | 2–3 | Beşiktaş | 22–25 | 23–25 | 25–17 | 25–19 | 13–15 | 108–101 | Report |
| 18 Nov | 16:00 | VakıfBank | 3–0 | Çanakkale Bld | 25–17 | 25–22 | 25–19 | – | – | 75–58 | Report |
| 18 Nov | 16:30 | Seramiksan | 3–0 | Ilbank | 25–18 | 25–19 | 26–24 | – | – | 76–61 | Report |
| 18 Nov | 17:30 | Bursa BŞB | 2–3 | Nilüfer Bld | 22–25 | 25–16 | 15–25 | 25–20 | 15–17 | 102–103 | Report |

=== Week 9 ===
| Date | Time | | Score | | Set 1 | Set 2 | Set 3 | Set 4 | Set 5 | Total | Report |
|---|---|---|---|---|---|---|---|---|---|---|---|
| 25 Nov | 14:00 | Nilüfer Bld | 1–3 | Halkbank | 20–25 | 22–25 | 25–19 | 22–25 | – | 89–94 | Report |
| 25 Nov | 14:00 | Galatasaray Daikin | 3–0 | Beylikduzu | 25–23 | 25–18 | 27–25 | – | – | 77–66 | Report |
| 25 Nov | 15:00 | Ilbank | 0–3 | Bursa BŞB | 19–25 | 18–25 | 20–25 | – | – | 57–75 | Report |
| 25 Nov | 16:00 | Eczacıbaşı VitrA | 3–0 | Seramiksan | 26–24 | 25–19 | 25–12 | – | – | 76–55 | Report |
| 25 Nov | 17:00 | Çanakkale Bld | 3–2 | Beşiktaş | 27–25 | 20–25 | 21–25 | 25–20 | 16–14 | 109–109 | Report |
| 25 Nov | 17:00 | VakıfBank | 3–1 | Fenerbahçe | 25–18 | 25–14 | 21–27 | 25–12 | – | 96–71 | Report |

=== Week 10 ===
| Date | Time | | Score | | Set 1 | Set 2 | Set 3 | Set 4 | Set 5 | Total | Report |
|---|---|---|---|---|---|---|---|---|---|---|---|
| 02 Dec | 14:00 | Bursa BŞB | 2–3 | Eczacıbaşı VitrA | 25–23 | 18–25 | 25–23 | 21–25 | 12–15 | 101–111 | Report |
| 02 Dec | 14:00 | Beşiktaş | 2–3 | Galatasaray Daikin | 20–25 | 27–25 | 25–20 | 23–25 | 17–19 | 112–114 | Report |
| 02 Dec | 14:00 | Fenerbahçe | 3–0 | Çanakkale Bld | 25–16 | 25–21 | 25–10 | – | – | 75–47 | Report |
| 02 Dec | 15:00 | Halkbank | 3–0 | Ilbank | 25–15 | 25–16 | 25–22 | – | – | 75–53 | Report |
| 02 Dec | 16:00 | Beylikduzu | 3–1 | Nilüfer Bld | 25–23 | 18–25 | 25–18 | 25–17 | – | 93–83 | Report |
| 02 Dec | 16:30 | Seramiksan | 0–3 | VakıfBank | 17–25 | 17–25 | 22–25 | – | – | 56–75 | Report |

=== Week 11 ===
| Date | Time | | Score | | Set 1 | Set 2 | Set 3 | Set 4 | Set 5 | Total | Report |
|---|---|---|---|---|---|---|---|---|---|---|---|
| 05 Dec | 16:00 | VakıfBank | 3–0 | Bursa BŞB | 25–19 | 25–13 | 25–17 | – | – | 75–49 | Report |
| 05 Dec | 17:00 | Ilbank | 0–3 | Beylikduzu | 25–27 | 17–25 | 15–25 | – | – | 57–77 | Report |
| 05 Dec | 17:00 | Çanakkale Bld | 2–3 | Galatasaray Daikin | 27–25 | 18–25 | 18–25 | 25–18 | 14–16 | 102–109 | Report |
| 05 Dec | 17:30 | Nilüfer Bld | 3–0 | Beşiktaş | 25–20 | 26–24 | 25–20 | – | – | 76–64 | Report |
| 05 Dec | 17:30 | Fenerbahçe | 3–0 | Seramiksan | 25–23 | 25–21 | 25–12 | – | – | 75–56 | Report |
| 05 Dec | 18:00 | Eczacıbaşı VitrA | 3–0 | Halkbank | 25–19 | 25–17 | 25–22 | – | – | 75–58 | Report |

=== Week 12 ===
| Date | Time | | Score | | Set 1 | Set 2 | Set 3 | Set 4 | Set 5 | Total | Report |
|---|---|---|---|---|---|---|---|---|---|---|---|
| 07 Jan | 17:30 | Seramiksan | 2–3 | Çanakkale Bld | 26–24 | 22–25 | 28–26 | 20–25 | 11–15 | 107–115 | Report |
| 07 Jan | 18:00 | VakıfBank | 3–0 | Halkbank | 25–15 | 25–15 | 25–21 | – | – | 75–51 | Report |
| 07 Jan | 19:00 | Eczacıbaşı VitrA | 3–0 | Beylikduzu | 25–18 | 25–14 | 25–13 | – | – | 75–45 | Report |
| 07 Jan | 19:00 | Fenerbahçe | 3–2 | Bursa BŞB | 22–25 | 23–25 | 25–13 | 25–13 | 15–9 | 110–85 | Report |
| 07 Jan | 19:00 | Ilbank | 0–3 | Beşiktaş | 18–25 | 15–25 | 16–25 | – | – | 49–75 | Report |
| 07 Jan | 19:00 | Nilüfer Bld | 1–3 | Galatasaray Daikin | 25–23 | 14–25 | 20–25 | 16–25 | – | 75–98 | Report |

=== Week 13 ===
| Date | Time | | Score | | Set 1 | Set 2 | Set 3 | Set 4 | Set 5 | Total | Report |
|---|---|---|---|---|---|---|---|---|---|---|---|
| 14 Jan | 17:00 | Beylikduzu | 1–3 | VakıfBank | 21–25 | 26–24 | 17–25 | 15–25 | – | 79–99 | Report |
| 14 Jan | 19:00 | Beşiktaş | 1–3 | Eczacıbaşı VitrA | 25–18 | 19–25 | 19–25 | 13–25 | – | 76–93 | Report |
| 14 Jan | 19:00 | Bursa BŞB | 3–1 | Seramiksan | 25–23 | 20–25 | 25–15 | 25–22 | – | 95–85 | Report |
| 14 Jan | 19:00 | Çanakkale Bld | 1–3 | Nilüfer Bld | 13–25 | 25–21 | 17–25 | 19–25 | – | 74–96 | Report |
| 14 Jan | 19:00 | Galatasaray Daikin | 3–1 | Ilbank | 17–25 | 25–16 | 25–20 | 25–7 | – | 92–68 | Report |
| 14 Jan | 19:00 | Halkbank | 3–1 | Fenerbahçe | 25–19 | 25–18 | 17–25 | 25–18 | – | 92–80 | Report |

=== Week 14 ===
| Date | Time | | Score | | Set 1 | Set 2 | Set 3 | Set 4 | Set 5 | Total | Report |
|---|---|---|---|---|---|---|---|---|---|---|---|
| 17 Jan | 16:00 | VakıfBank | 3–1 | Beşiktaş | 25–21 | 25–15 | 23–25 | 25–20 | – | 98–81 | Report |
| 17 Jan | 16:30 | Seramiksan | 3–1 | Halkbank | 10–25 | 25–19 | 28–26 | 25–21 | – | 88–91 | Report |
| 17 Jan | 17:30 | Bursa BŞB | 3–0 | Çanakkale Bld | 25–23 | 30–28 | 25–19 | – | – | 80–70 | Report |
| 17 Jan | 18:30 | Fenerbahçe | 3–0 | Beylikduzu | 25–23 | 25–21 | 25–20 | – | – | 75–64 | Report |
| 18 Jan | 19:00 | Eczacıbaşı VitrA | 3–2 | Galatasaray Daikin | 23–25 | 22–25 | 25–23 | 25–14 | 16–14 | 111–101 | Report |
| 18 Jan | 15:00 | Ilbank | 0–3 | Nilüfer Bld | 17–25 | 21–25 | 13–25 | – | – | 51–75 | Report |

=== Week 15 ===
| Date | Time | | Score | | Set 1 | Set 2 | Set 3 | Set 4 | Set 5 | Total | Report |
|---|---|---|---|---|---|---|---|---|---|---|---|
| 20 Jan | 17:00 | VakıfBank | 3–1 | Galatasaray Daikin | 25–12 | 16–25 | 25–22 | 26–24 | | 92–83 | |
| 21 Jan | 20:00 | Beylikduzu | 0–3 | Seramiksan | 17–25 | 23–25 | 21–25 | | | 61–75 | |
| 21 Jan | 21:00 | Halkbank | 0–3 | Bursa BŞB | 25–22 | 25–16 | 18–25 | 20–25 | 12–15 | 100–103 | |
| 21 Jan | 21:00 | Beşiktaş | 2–3 | Fenerbahçe | 25–19 | 21–25 | 25–20 | 23–25 | 13–215 | 107–304 | |
| 21 Jan | 21:30 | Nilüfer Bld | 0–3 | Eczacıbaşı VitrA | 13–25 | 7–25 | 21–25 | | | 41–75 | |
| 22 Jan | 21:30 | Ilbank | 3–0 | Çanakkale Bld | 25–15 | 25–16 | 25–12 | | | 75–43 | |

=== Week 16 ===
| Date | Time | | Score | | Set 1 | Set 2 | Set 3 | Set 4 | Set 5 | Total | Report |
|---|---|---|---|---|---|---|---|---|---|---|---|
| 28 Jan | 14:00 | Fenerbahçe | 0–3 | Galatasaray Daikin | 23–25 | 20–25 | 19–25 | | | 62–75 | |
| 28 Jan | 14:00 | Seramiksan | 1–3 | Beşiktaş | 17–25 | 23–25 | 25–15 | 23–25 | | 88–90 | |
| 28 Jan | 15:30 | Halkbank | 3–0 | Çanakkale Bld | 25–13 | 25–15 | 25–19 | | | 75–47 | |
| 28 Jan | 17:00 | VakıfBank | 3–0 | Nilüfer Bld | 25–18 | 25–16 | 25–23 | | | 75–57 | |
| 28 Jan | 17:30 | Eczacıbaşı VitrA | 3–0 | Ilbank | 25–18 | 25–12 | 25–13 | | | 75–43 | |
| 28 Jan | 18:30 | Bursa BŞB | 3–1 | Beylikduzu | 25–22 | 21–25 | 25–18 | 30–28 | | 101–93 | |

== Play-outs ==
| Pos | Team | Pld | W | L | Pts | SW | SL | SR | SPW | SPL | SPR | Qualification | BEY | SER | CAN | ILB |
|---|---|---|---|---|---|---|---|---|---|---|---|---|---|---|---|---|
| 9 | Beylikdüzü | 28 | 14 | 14 | 42 | 56 | 56 | 1.000 | 2411 | 2383 | 1.012 | | — | 3–0 | 3–1 | 3–1 |
| 10 | Seramiksan | 28 | 11 | 17 | 36.335 | 50 | 62 | 0.806 | 2327 | 2465 | 0.944 | | 2–3 | — | 3–1 | 3–1 |
| 11 | Çanakkale Belediye | 28 | 8 | 20 | 22.6 | 38 | 70 | 0.543 | 2234 | 2455 | 0.910 | Relegation | 1–3 | 3–2 | — | 3–0 |
| 12 | İlbank | 28 | 0 | 28 | 4.31 | 8 | 84 | 0.095 | 1594 | 2251 | 0.708 | Relegation | 0–3 | 0–3 | 0–3 | — |

Source: Sultanlar Ligi

== Play-offs ==
The eight teams that finished in the places 1 to 8 in the Regular season, compete in the Play-off (1-8).

Fifth place
5 | Bursa BŞB | 6
7 | Beşiktaş | 0
Seventh place
8 | Nilüfer Bld | 5
6 | Halkbank | 1

Consolation semifinals
8 | Nilüfer Bld | 2
5 | Bursa BŞB | 7
7 | Beşiktaş | 5
6 | Halkbank | 1

Quarterfinals
1 | Eczacıbaşı VitrA | 6
8 | Nilüfer Bld | 0
4 | Fenerbahçe | 5
5 | Bursa BŞB | 1
2 | VakıfBank | 6
7 | Beşiktaş | 0
3 | Galatasaray Daikin | 7
6 | Halkbank | 2

Semifinals
1 | Eczacıbaşı VitrA | 6
4 | Fenerbahçe | 0
2 | VakıfBank | 5
3 | Galatasaray Daikin | 1

Final
1 | Eczacıbaşı VitrA | 5
2 | VakıfBank | 10
Third place
4 | Fenerbahçe | 6
3 | Galatasaray Daikin | 0

=== Quarterfinals ===
| Team 1 | Agg. | Team 2 | 1st leg | 2nd leg | 3rd leg |
|---|---|---|---|---|---|
| Eczacıbaşı VitrA | 6–0 | Nilüfer Bld | 3–0 | 3–0 | *Finished* |
| VakıfBank | 6–0 | Beşiktaş | 3–0 | 3–0 | *Finished* |
| Galatasaray Daikin | 7–2 | Halkbank | 2–3 | 3–0 | 3–1 |
| Fenerbahçe | 5–1 | Bursa BŞB | 3–1 | 3–2 | *Finished* |

=== Fifth place play-offs ===
- Winners qualify for CEV Challenge Cup main phase.
- 2 matches were needed for win.

| Team 1 | Agg. | Team 2 | 1st leg | 2nd leg | 3rd leg |
|---|---|---|---|---|---|
| Nilüfer Bld | 2–7 | Bursa BŞB | 1–3 | 3–2 | 1–3 |
| Halkbank | 1–5 | Beşiktaş | 2–3 | 1–3 | *Finished* |

=== Semifinals ===
- Winners qualify for CEV Champions League league round.

| Team 1 | Agg. | Team 2 | 1st leg | 2nd leg |
|---|---|---|---|---|
| Eczacıbaşı VitrA | 6–0 | Fenerbahçe | 3–1 | 3–0 |
| VakıfBank | 5–1 | Galatasaray Daikin | 3–0 | 3–2 |

=== Seventh place matches ===
| Team 1 | Agg. | Team 2 | 1st leg | 2nd leg |
|---|---|---|---|---|
| Nilüfer Bld | 5–1 | Halkbank | 3–0 | 3–2 |

=== Fifth place matches ===
| Team 1 | Agg. | Team 2 | 1st leg | 2nd leg |
|---|---|---|---|---|
| Bursa BŞB | 6–0 | Beşiktaş | 3–1 | 3–1 |

=== Third place matches ===
- Winner qualify for CEV Champions League qualification round.
- Loser qualify for CEV Cup main phase.

| Team 1 | Agg. | Team 2 | 1st leg | 2nd leg |
|---|---|---|---|---|
| Fenerbahçe | 6–0 | Galatasaray Daikin | 3–1 | 3–0 |

=== Final matches ===
- 5 matches were needed for win.

| Team 1 | Agg. | Team 2 | 1st leg | 2nd leg | 3rd leg | 4th leg | 5th leg |
|---|---|---|---|---|---|---|---|
| Eczacıbaşı VitrA | 5–10 | VakıfBank | 0–3 | 3–1 | 3–2 | 0–3 | 0–3 |
VakıfBank won by 3–2 matches.

== Final standing ==
| Rank | Team |
|---|---|
| 1st place, gold medalist(s) | VakıfBank (Q) |
| 2nd place, silver medalist(s) | Eczacıbaşı VitrA (Q) |
| 3rd place, bronze medalist(s) | Fenerbahçe (Q) |
| 4 | Galatasaray Daikin (X) |
| 5 | Bursa BŞB (Y) |
| 6 | Beşiktaş |
| 7 | Nilüfer Bld |
| 8 | Halkbank |
| 9 | Beylikduzu |
| 10 | Seramiksan |
| 11 | Çanakkale Bld (R) |
| 12 | İller Bankası (R) |

| (Q) | Qualified for the CEV Champions League league round |
| (X) | Qualified for the CEV Cup main phase |
| (Y) | Qualified for the CEV Challenge Cup main phase |
| (R) | Relegated to the Second League |

2017–18 Turkish Women's Volleyball League
VakıfBank
10th title

Team roster
Gizem Örge, Gözde Kırdar (C), Cansu Özbay, Zhu Ting, Kübra Çalışkan, Kelsey Robinson, Melis Gürkaynak, Ayça Aykaç, Lonneke Slöetjes, Naz Aydemir Akyol, Melis Durul, Milena Rašić, Tuğba Şenoğlu, Zehra Güneş
Head coach
Giovanni Guidetti

== Awards ==
=== Regular season ===
- Best scorer

(Ukraine) Olesia Rykhliuk (Beşiktaş)

- Best setter

(Turkey) Ezgi Dilik (Eczacıbaşı VitrA)

- Best outside spikers

(Netherlands) Anne Buijs (Nilüfer Belediyespor)
(Azerbaijan) (Slovakia) Jana Kulan (Kameroğlu Beylikdüzü Vol. İht.)

- Best middle blockers

(Turkey) Yasemin Güveli (Eczacıbaşı VitrA)
(Brazil) Ana Carolina da Silva (Nilüfer Belediyespor)

- Best opposite spiker

(Serbia) Tijana Bošković (Eczacıbaşı VitrA)

- Best libero

(Turkey) Pinar Eren (Beşiktaş)

=== Finals Series ===
| Award | Player | Team |
|---|---|---|
| MVP | (China) Zhu Ting | VakıfBank |
| Best Spiker | (Turkey) Gözde Kırdar | VakıfBank |
| Best Blocker | (Turkey) Beyza Arıcı | Eczacıbaşı VitrA |
| Best Setter | (Turkey) Cansu Özbay | VakıfBank |
| Best Libero | (Turkey) Gizem Örge | VakıfBank |
| Special Award | (Turkey) Zehra Gunes | VakıfBank |
