= Meliha İsmailoğlu =

Bosnian-Turkish volleyball player (born 1993)

Meliha Diken
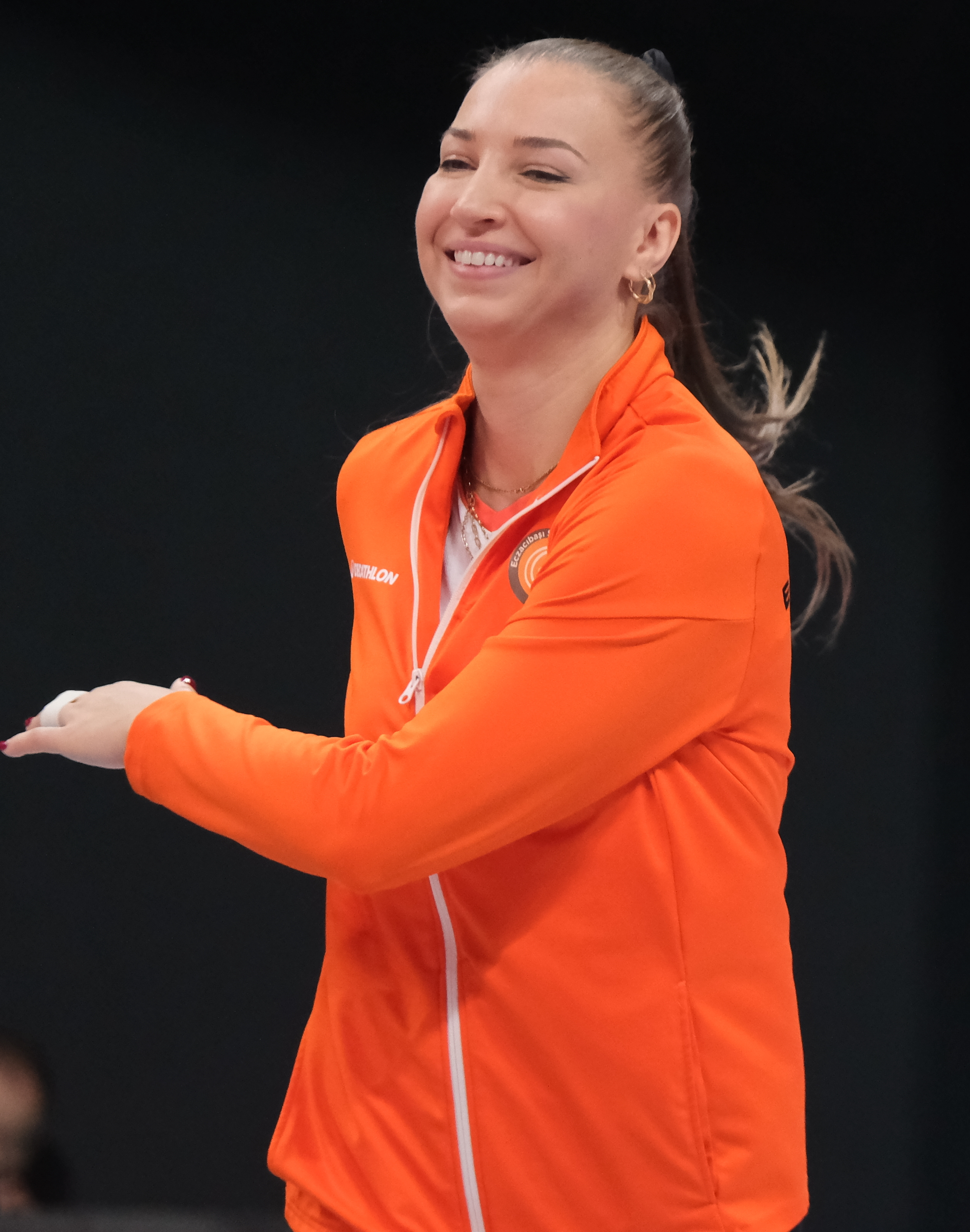

Personal information
- Born: Meliha Smajlović; 17 September 1993 (age 33); Gradačac, Bosnia and Herzegovina
- Height: 1.90 m (6 ft 3 in)
- Weight: 71 kg (157 lb)

Volleyball information
- Position: Outside Hitter
- Current club: LOVB Madison

Career
Years
- 2001–2011
- 2011–2014
- 2014–2017
- 2017-2019
- 2019-2021
- 2021–2025
- 2025–2026
- 2026-
Teams
- Kula Gradačac
- İller Bankası
- Fenerbahçe
- Eczacıbaşı VitrA
- VakifBank S.K
- Fenerbahçe
- Eczacıbaşı VitrA
- LOVB Madison

National team
2014-2025	Turkey
Honours
Women's volleyball
Representing Turkey
European Championship
Silver medal – second place	2019 Turkey	Team
Bronze medal – third place	2021 Serbia/Bulgaria/Croatia/Romania	Team
FIVB Nations League
Silver medal – second place	2018 Nanjing	Team
Bronze medal – third place	2021 Rimini	Team
European Games
Gold medal – first place	2015 Baku	Team
Islamic Solidarity Games
Silver medal – second place	2017 Baku	Team
Montreux Volley Masters
Gold medal – first place	2015 Montreux	Team
Women's U23 World Championship
Silver medal – second place	2015 Ankara	Team
Women's European Volleyball League
Gold medal – first place	2014 Germany/Turkey	Team

Meliha İsmailoğlu Diken (born Meliha Smajlović, 17 September 1993 in Gradačac) is a Bosnian-Turkish volleyball player. She is 190 cm (6.2 ft) tall at 73 kg (161 lb). Currently, she plays for Fenerbahçe. İsmailoğlu is a member of the Turkey women's national volleyball team.

== Career ==
=== Clubs ===
The daughter of a former basketball player, she too aspired to become a basketball player. However, due to lack of a women's basketball team in her hometown, she chose playing volleyball. She began her sports career at the age of eight in the club Kula Gradacac in her hometown. In 2009 and 2011, she was named "Player of the Year". In the summer time, she played also beach volleyball in Bosnia Herzegovina.

In 2011, İsmailoğlu was invited to Turkey by the Ankara-based İller Bankası. In May 2014, she signed with Fenerbahçe.

She transferred to Eczacıbaşı VitrA in 2017 and Vakıfbank in 2019. Finally she returned to Fenerbahçe in 2021.

In 2025, it was announced that Meliha would leave Fenerbaçhe to return to Eczacıbaşı for the 2025/2026 season.

League One Volleyball or known as LOVB, announced Meliha Diken is the first Turkish player to join LOVB Pro for the 2027 season.

=== National team ===
İsmailoğlu was a member of the Bosnia and Herzegovina youth and juniors national teams. Her double citizenship enabled her to opt in playing for the Turkey women's national volleyball team. She played at the 2014 Women's European Volleyball League that won the gold medal.

She represented Turkey at the qualification round for beach volleyball at the 2016 Summer Olympics.

İsmailoğlu competed for Turkey at the 2020 Summer Olympics and the 2024 Summer Olympics.

In 2026, the President of TVF, gifted Diken a plaque and her jersey number as a thank you for her time with the national time. Meliha Diken officially announced her retirement from the national team on June 22

== Awards ==
=== National team ===
- 2014 Women's European Volleyball League – Gold medal
- 2014 Grand Prix finals – 4th place
- 2015 Montreux Volley Masters – Gold medal
- 2015 European Games – Gold medal
- 2015 FIVB Volleyball Women's U23 World Championship – Silver medal
- 2018 Nations League – Silver Medal
- 2019 European Championship – Silver Medal
- 2021 Nations League – Bronze Medal
- 2021 European Championship – Bronze Medal

=== Club ===
- 2014 Turkish Super Cup – Runner-Up, with Fenerbahçe Grundig
- 2014–15 Turkish Cup – Champion, with Fenerbahçe Grundig
- 2014–15 Turkish Women's Volleyball League – Champion, with Fenerbahçe Grundig
- 2015-2016 Turkish cup – Champion, with Fenerbahce Grundig
- 2015-2016 CEV Champions League – Bronze medal, with Fenerbahce Grundig
- 2016–17 Turkish Cup – Champion, with Fenerbahçe
- 2016–17 Turkish Volleyball League – Champion, with Fenerbahçe Grundig
- 2019 FIVB Club World Championship – Bronze medal, with VakıfBank
- 2020 Turkish Super Cup – Runner-Up, with Vakıfbank
- 2020–21 Turkish Cup – Champion, with Vakıfbank
- 2020–21 Turkish Women's Volleyball League – Champion, with Vakıfbank
- 2020-21 CEV Champions League – Silver Medal, with Vakıfbank
- 2021–22 Turkish Super Cup – Champion, with Fenerbahçe Opet
- 2022-2023 CEV Champions League – Bronze medal, with Fenerbahce Grundig
- 2022–23 Turkish Volleyball League – Champion, with Fenerbahçe Opet
- 2023-2024 CEV Champions League – Bronze medal, with Fenerbahce Grundig
- 2023–24 Turkish Volleyball Cup – Champion, with Fenerbahçe Opet
- 2023–24 Turkish Volleyball League – Champion, with Fenerbahçe Opet
- 2024 Turkish Super Cup – Champion, with Fenerbahçe Medicana
- 2024–25 Turkish Volleyball Cup – Champion, with Fenerbahçe Medicana

=== Individuals ===
- Player of the Year – 2009 and 2011 in Bosnia and Herzegovina

== See also ==
- Turkish women in sports
- Bosnian women in sports
- Bosnian women athletes
