= 2016–17 Turkish Women's Volleyball League =

- League: Turkish Women's Volleyball League
- Sport: Volleyball
- Games: 132 (Regular Season)
- Teams: 12

Regular Season
- Top scorer: (China) Zhu Ting (VakıfBank)

Finals
- Champions: Fenerbahçe
- Runners-up: Galatasaray Daikin
- Finals MVP: (Brazil) Natália Pereira

Turkish Women's Volleyball League seasons
- ← 2015–16 2017–18 →

The 2016–17 Turkish Women's Volleyball League is the 34th edition of the top-flight professional women's volleyball league in Turkey.

== Regular season ==
=== League table ===
Pos	Club	Pld	W	L	SW	SL	PAYP	Pts
1	VakıfBank (A)	22	21	1	63	8	2.080	64.080
2	Fenerbahçe (A)	22	19	3	60	21	1.360	56.360
3	Eczacıbaşı VitrA (A)	22	17	5	59	27	1.870	54.870
4	Galatasaray Daikin (A)	22	15	7	51	29	1.200	46.200
5	Bursa BŞB (A)	22	12	10	43	39	2.080	38.080
6	Çanakkale Bld (A)	22	11	11	43	39	0.870	34.870
7	Halkbank (A)	22	9	13	37	49	2.050	29.050
8	Beşiktaş (A)	22	10	12	34	49	0.720	27.720
9	Seramiksan (a)	22	7	15	33	55	0.870	19.870
10	İdman Ocağı (a)	22	5	17	24	56	0.450	15.450
11	Nilüfer Bld (a)	22	2	20	21	60	1.710	12.710
12	Sarıyer Bld (a)	22	4	18	20	56	0.300	12.300

(A)	Advance to Playoffs
(a)	Advance to Play out

Source: Turkish Volleyball Federation

Updated: 28 March 2017

=== Results ===
Home \ Away	BEŞ	BUR	ÇAN	ECZ	FEN	GAL	HAL	İDM	NİL	SAR	SER	VAK
Beşiktaş		3–0	1–3	0–3	0–3	1–3	3–0	3–2	3–2	3–1	3–1	0–3
Bursa BŞB	3–0		2–3	3–2	1–3	2–3	3–1	3–0	3–1	3–0	3–1	0–3
Çanakkale Bld	3–0	0–3		1–3	2–3	0–3	2–3	3–1	3–1	3–1	3–0	1–3
Eczacıbaşı VitrA	3–1	3–0	3–1		2–3	3–1	3–1	3–0	3–0	3–0	2–3	2–3
Fenerbahçe	3–0	3–0	2–3	1–3		3–1	3–2	3–0	3–0	3–1	3–1	0–3
Galatasaray Daikin	3–0	2–3	3–1	1–3	1–3		3–1	3–1	3–0	3–1	3–0	0–3
Halkbank	3–1	3–1	1–3	1–3	0–3	0–3		3–1	3–1	3–1	3–2	0–3
İdman Ocağı	1–3	3–1	3–1	0–3	0–3	1–3	3–1		3–2	3–0	1–3	0–3
Nilüfer Bld	2–3	1–3	1–3	2–3	0–3	0–3	0–3	3–0		0–3	2–3	0–3
Sarıyer Bld	0–3	0–3	0–3	0–3	0–3	0–3	0–3	3–1	3–0		3–1	1–3
Seramiksan	1–3	1–3	3–2	2–3	1–3	0–3	3–2	3–0	0–3	3–1		0–3
VakıfBank	3–0	3–0	3–0	3–0	0–3	3–0	3–0	3–0	3–0	3–0	3–1	

Updated to match(es) played on 28 March 2017. Source: TWVL Fixtures
Legend: Blue = home team win; Yellow = draw; Red = away team win.

== Play-outs ==
Pos	Club	Pld	W	L	SW	SL	Pts
9	Seramiksan	28	10	18	46	66	28.87
10	Nilüfer Bld	28	7	21	37	66	27.71
11	Sarıyer Bld	28	7	21	31	67	22.3
12	İdman Ocağı	28	6	22	29	73	17.45

Relegation to Turkish Women Volleyball Second League

Home \ Away	İDM	NİL	SAR	SER
İdman Ocağı		1–3	0–3	3–2
Nilüfer Bld	3–0		1–3	3–1
Sarıyer Bld	3–1	0–3		2–3
Seramiksan	3–0	1–3	3–0	

Legend: Blue = home team win; Yellow = draw; Red = away team win.

== Play-offs ==
The eight teams that finished in the places 1 to 8 in the Regular season, compete in the Play-off (1-8).

Fifth place
6	Çanakkale Bld	0
5	Bursa BŞB	6
Seventh place
7	Halkbank	1
8	Beşiktaş	5

Consolation semifinals
6	Çanakkale Bld	5
7	Halkbank	4
5	Bursa BŞB	7
8	Beşiktaş	2

Quarterfinals
6	Çanakkale Bld	0
3	Eczacıbaşı VitrA	6
7	Halkbank	1
2	Fenerbahçe	5
5	Bursa BŞB	0
4	Galatasaray	6
8	Beşiktaş	1
1	VakıfBank	5

Semifinals
3	Eczacıbaşı VitrA	3 (14)
2	Fenerbahçe (golden set)	3 (16)
4	Galatasaray	4
1	VakıfBank	2

Final
2	Fenerbahçe	9
4	Galatasaray	0
Third place
3	Eczacıbaşı VitrA	0
1	VakıfBank	6

=== Quarterfinals ===
Team 1	Agg.	Team 2	1st leg	2nd leg
Çanakkale Bld	0–6	Eczacıbaşı VitrA	1–3	0–3
Halkbank	1–5	Fenerbahçe	2–3	0–3
Bursa BŞB	0–6	Galatasaray Daikin	0–3	0–3
Beşiktaş	1–5	VakıfBank	2–3	1–3

=== Fifth place play-offs ===
- Winners qualify for CEV Challenge Cup main phase.
- 2 matches were needed for win.

Team 1	Agg.	Team 2	1st leg	2nd leg	3rd leg
Çanakkale Bld	5–4	Halkbank	3–2	2–3	3–2
Çanakkale Bld won by 2–1 matches
Bursa BŞB	3–3	Beşiktaş	3–0	2–3	3–1
Bursa BŞB won by 2–1 matches.

=== Semifinals ===
- Winners qualify for CEV Champions League league round.

|-

Team 1	Agg.	Team 2	1st leg	2nd leg
Eczacıbaşı VitrA	3–3	Fenerbahçe	3–0	1–3
Fenerbahçe won by golden set 16–14.
Galatasaray Daikin	4–2	VakıfBank	3–0	2–3

=== Seventh place matches ===
Team 1	Agg.	Team 2	1st leg	2nd leg
Halkbank	1–5	Beşiktaş	0–3	2–3

=== Fifth place matches ===
Team 1	Agg.	Team 2	1st leg	2nd leg
Çanakkale Bld	0–6	Bursa BŞB	0–3	1–3

=== Third place matches ===
- Winner qualify for CEV Champions League qualification round.
- Loser qualify for CEV Cup main phase.

Team 1	Agg.	Team 2	1st leg	2nd leg
Eczacıbaşı VitrA	0–6	VakıfBank	0–3	1–3

=== Final matches ===
- 3 matches were needed for win.

Team 1	Agg.	Team 2	1st leg	2nd leg	3rd leg
Fenerbahçe	9–0	Galatasaray Daikin	3–0	3–0	3–0
Fenerbahçe won by 3–0 matches.

== Final standing ==
Rank	Team
1st place, gold medalist(s)	Fenerbahçe (Q)
2nd place, silver medalist(s)	Galatasaray Daikin (Q)
3rd place, bronze medalist(s)	VakıfBank (A)
4	Eczacıbaşı VitrA (X)
5	Bursa BŞB (Y)
6	Çanakkale Bld
7	Beşiktaş
8	Halkbank
9	Seramiksan
10	Nilüfer Bld
11	Sarıyer Bld (R)
12	İdman Ocağı (R)

(Q)	Qualified for the CEV Champions League league round
(A)	Qualified for the CEV Champions League qualification round
(X)	Qualified for the CEV Cup main phase
(Y)	Qualified for the CEV Challenge Cup main phase
(R)	Relegated to the Second League

2016–17 Turkish Women's Volleyball League
Fenerbahçe
Fifth title

Team roster
Melis Yılmaz, Merve Dalbeler, Ergül Avcı, Polen Uslupehlivan, Dicle Nur Babat, Meliha İsmailoğlu, Kim Yeon-koung, Ezgi Dilik, Natália Pereira, Nootsara Tomkom, Eda Erdem Dündar (c), Şeyma Ercan, Maret Balkestein-Grothues, Bahar Toksoy
Head coach
Marcello Abbondanza

== Awards ==
=== Regular season ===
- Best setter

(Turkey) Naz Aydemir (VakıfBank)

- Best outside spikers

(China) Zhu Ting (Vakıfbank İstanbul)
(Croatia) Mia Jerkov (Çanakkale Bld.)

- Best middle blockers

(Serbia) Milena Rašić (VakıfBank)
(Turkey) Eda Erdem Dündar (Fenerbahçe)

- Best opposite spiker

(Serbia) Tijana Bošković (Eczacıbaşı VitrA)

- Best libero

(Turkey) Nihan Güneyligil (Galatasaray Daikin)

=== Finals series ===
Award	Player	Team
MVP	(Brazil) Natália Pereira	Fenerbahçe
Best Spiker	(Turkey) Seda Tokatlıoğlu	Galatasaray
Best Blocker	(Turkey) Eda Erdem Dündar	Fenerbahçe
Best Setter	(Turkey) Gamze Alikaya	Galatasaray
Best Libero	(Turkey) Nihan Güneyligil	Galatasaray
Special Award	(Turkey) Dicle Nur Babat	Fenerbahçe
