= Dicle (name) =

Dicle (IPA: [ˈdidʒle]) is a Kurdish and Turkish surname and feminine given name. Its meaning in the Turkish and kurdish language are "Tigris". Together with the Euphrates, the Tigris formed the heart of Mesopotamia (the land between the two rivers). This region is considered one of the cradles of humanity.

== Given name ==
- Dicle Nur Babat (born 1992), Turkish volleyball player

== Surname ==
- Ahmet Dicle (born 1980), Kurdish journalist and television presenter
- Hacer Dicle (1902–1966), Turkish politician
- Hamdi Dicle (born 1932), Turkish painter and art educator
- Hatip Dicle (born 1954), Kurdish politician
