= 2015–16 Turkish Women's Volleyball League =

- League: Turkish Women's Volleyball League
- Sport: Volleyball
- Games: 132 (Regular Season)
- Teams: 12
- TV partner(s): NTV Spor, D-Smart

Regular Season
- Season champions: Fenerbahçe Grundig
- Top scorer: (Brazil) Joyce Silva

Finals
- Champions: VakıfBank
- Runners-up: Fenerbahçe Grundig
- Finals MVP: (United States) Kimberly Hill

Turkish Women's Volleyball League seasons
- ← 2014–15 2016–17 →

The 2015–16 Turkish Women's Volleyball League is the 33rd edition of the top-flight professional women's volleyball league in Turkey.

== Regular season ==
=== League table ===
Pos	Team	Pld	W	L	PF	PA	PD	Pts	Qualification
1	Fenerbahçe Grundig	22	20	2	64	13	+51	61	Playoffs
2	VakıfBank	22	20	2	63	14	+49	59	Playoffs
3	Eczacıbaşı VitrA	22	18	4	58	23	+35	52	Playoffs
4	Galatasaray Daikin	22	15	7	52	36	+16	43	Playoffs
5	Nilüfer Bld	22	11	11	43	40	+3	35	Playoffs
6	Bursa BŞB	22	12	10	42	42	0	34	Playoffs
7	Sarıyer Bld	22	11	11	41	47	−6	29	Playoffs
8	Çanakkale Bld	22	9	13	36	46	−10	28	Playoffs
9	Halkbank	22	8	14	31	49	−18	23	Play out
10	İdman Ocağı	22	4	18	28	61	−33	15	Play out
11	Salihli Bld	22	3	19	20	62	−42	10	Play out
12	İlbank	22	1	21	18	63	−45	7	Play out

Source: Turkish Volleyball Federation

=== Results ===
Home \ Away	BUR	ÇAN	ECZ	FEN	GAL	HAL	İDM	İLB	NİL	SAL	SAR	VAK
Bursa BŞB		3–1	0–3	0–3	2–3	3–0	3–2	3–1	3–2	3–0	2–3	0–3
Çanakkale Bld	2–3		0–3	1–3	1–3	3–1	3–0	3–0	0–3	3–1	3–1	0–3
Eczacıbaşı VitrA	3–0	3–0		3–2	3–1	1–3	3–2	3–0	3–1	3–0	3–1	3–1
Fenerbahçe Grundig	3–0	3–1	3–1		3–0	3–0	3–0	3–0	3–0	3–0	3–0	3–2
Galatasaray Daikin	3–1	3–1	3–1	0–3		3–0	3–2	3–1	1–3	3–0	3–1	2–3
Halkbank	2–3	0–3	0–3	1–3	0–3		3–0	3–0	1–3	3–1	1–3	0–3
İdman Ocağı	1–3	1–3	1–3	0–3	3–2	0–3		3–2	3–1	3–2	2–3	0–3
İlbank	0–3	2–3	1–3	0–3	1–3	1–3	3–0		0–3	2–3	2–3	0–3
Nilüfer Bld	1–3	3–2	0–3	1–3	2–3	2–3	3–1	3–0		3–0	3–1	0–3
Salihli Bld	0–3	1–3	0–3	0–3	0–3	2–3	3–2	3–1	1–3		2–3	1–3
Sarıyer Bld	3–1	3–0	1–3	0–3	2–3	3–1	3–2	3–1	0–3	3–0		1–3
VakıfBank	3–0	3–0	3–1	3–2	3–1	3–0	3–0	3–0	3–0	3–0	3–0	

Updated to match(es) played on 26 March 2016. Source: TWVL Fixtures
Legend: Blue = home team win; Yellow = draw; Red = away team win.

== Play-out ==
Pos	Team	Pld	W	L	PF	PA	PD	Pts	Relegation	HAL	İDM	İLB	SAL
9	Halkbank	28	10	18	41	61	−20	29			1–3	3–0	3–0
10	İdman Ocağı	28	8	20	43	70	−27	28		3–1		2–3	3–0
11	İlbank	28	6	22	33	72	−39	20	Relegation to Turkish Women Volleyball Second League	3–1	3–1		3–2
12	Salihli Bld	28	4	24	26	78	−52	14	Relegation to Turkish Women Volleyball Second League	3–1	1–3	0–3	

== Classification group ==
Pos	Team	Pld	W	L	PF	PA	PD	Pts	BUR	ÇAN	SAR	NİL
5	Bursa BŞB	6	4	2	15	9	+6	12		1–3	3–2	2–3
6	Çanakkale Bld	6	4	2	15	11	+4	12	1–3		3–1	2–3
7	Sarıyer Bld	6	2	4	10	14	−4	7	0–3	1–3		3–1
8	Nilüfer Bld	6	2	4	10	16	−6	5	0–3	2–3	1–3	

== Final group ==
Pos	Team	Pld	W	L	PF	PA	PD	Pts	VAK	FEN	ECZ	GAL
1	VakıfBank	6	6	0	18	6	+12	16		3–1	3–0	3–2
2	Fenerbahçe Grundig	6	4	2	14	11	+3	11	1–3		3–1	3–1
3	Eczacıbaşı VitrA	6	2	4	9	13	−4	7	0–3	2–3		3–0
4	Galatasaray Daikin	6	0	6	7	18	−11	2	2–3	1–3	1–3	

Turkish Women's Volleyball League
2015–16 champions
VakıfBank
Ninth title

== Awards ==
- Most valuable player

(United States) Kimberly Hill (VakıfBank)

- Best setter

(Turkey) Naz Aydemir (VakıfBank)

- Best outside spikers

(South Korea) Kim Yeon-Koung (Fenerbahçe Grundig)
(United States) Jordan Larson (Eczacıbaşı VitrA)

- Best middle blockers

(Turkey) Eda Erdem Dündar (Fenerbahçe Grundig)
(Serbia) Milena Rašić (VakıfBank)

- Best opposite spiker

(Netherlands) Lonneke Sloetjes(VakıfBank)

- Best libero

(Turkey) Gizem Örge (VakıfBank)

- Fair play award

(Turkey) Nihan Güneyliğil (Galatasaray Daikin)
