= 2013–14 Turkish Women's Volleyball League =

- League: Turkish Women's Volleyball League
- Sport: Volleyball
- Games: 132 (Regular Season)
- Teams: 12

Regular Season
- Season champions: VakıfBank

Finals
- Champions: VakıfBank
- Runners-up: Fenerbahçe

Turkish Women's Volleyball League seasons
- ← 2012–13 2014–15 →

The 2013–14 Turkish Women's Volleyball League is the 31st edition of the top-flight professional women's volleyball league in Turkey.

== Regular season ==
=== League table ===
Pos	Club	Pld	W	L	SW	SL	Pts
1	VakıfBank	22	21	1	63	11	61
2	Fenerbahçe	22	21	1	63	12	60
3	Eczacıbaşı VitrA	22	16	6	58	23	53
4	Galatasaray Daikin	22	17	5	55	27	46
5	Bursa BBSK	22	10	12	42	41	34
6	İller Bankası	22	10	12	38	44	29
7	Beşiktaş	22	9	13	39	50	28
8	Yeşilyurt	22	8	14	35	51	25
9	Sarıyer Bld	22	8	14	30	51	22
10	Halkbank	22	6	16	30	53	21
11	Çanakkale Bld	22	6	16	26	55	16
12	Ereğli Bld	22	0	22	5	66	0

Playoffs
Play out

Source: Turkish Volleyball Federation

== Play-out ==
Pos	Club	Pld	W	L	SW	SL	Pts
1	Sarıyer Bld	28	13	15	47	60	36
2	Çanakkale Bld	28	11	17	43	64	30
3	Halkbank	28	8	20	42	65	29
4	Ereğli Bld	28	0	28	7	84	0

Relegation to Turkish Women Volleyball Second League

== Playoffs ==
Quarterfinals
1	VakıfBank	2
8	Yeşilyurt	0
4	Galatasaray Daikin	2
5	Bursa BBSK	1
2	Fenerbahçe	2
7	Beşiktaş	0
3	Eczacıbaşı VitrA	2
6	İller Bankası	0

Semifinals
1	VakıfBank	2
4	Galatasaray Daikin	1
2	Fenerbahçe	2
3	Eczacıbaşı VitrA	0

Finals
1	VakıfBank	3
2	Fenerbahçe	1

Source: Turkish Volleyball Federation

Turkish Women's Volleyball League
2013–14 Champions
VakıfBank
Eighth Title

== Individual awards ==
Award	Player	Team
MVP	(Turkey) Gözde Kırdar	Vakıfbank
Best Scorer	(South Korea) Yeon-Koung Kim	Fenerbahçe
Best Spiker	(South Korea) Yeon-Koung Kim	Fenerbahçe
Best Blocker	(Turkey) Eda Erdem	Fenerbahçe
Best Server	(Turkey) Bahar Toksoy	Vakıfbank
Best Setter	(Turkey) Naz Aydemir	Vakıfbank
Best Receiver	(Turkey) Gözde Kırdar	Vakıfbank
Best Libero	(Turkey) Merve Dalbeler	Fenerbahçe
