= 2014–15 Turkish Women's Volleyball League =

- League: Turkish Women's Volleyball League
- Sport: Volleyball
- Games: 132 (Regular Season)
- Teams: 12
- TV partner(s): NTV Spor, D-Smart

Regular Season
- Season champions: VakıfBank
- Top scorer: (Cuba) Yusleinis Herrera

Finals
- Champions: Fenerbahçe Grundig
- Runners-up: VakıfBank
- Finals MVP: (South Korea) Kim Yeon-koung

Turkish Women's Volleyball League seasons
- ← 2013–14 2015–16 →

The 2014–15 Turkish Women's Volleyball League is the 32nd edition of the top-flight professional women's volleyball league in Turkey.

== Regular season ==
=== League table ===
Pos	Team	Pld	W	L	SF	SA	Pts	Qualification
1	VakıfBank	22	20	2	64	14	61	Playoffs
2	Fenerbahçe Grundig	22	20	2	63	11	60	Playoffs
3	Eczacıbaşı VitrA	22	20	2	62	19	57	Playoffs
4	Galatasaray Daikin	22	14	8	48	34	41	Playoffs
5	Nilüfer Bld	22	10	12	40	44	31	Playoffs
6	Bursa BŞB	22	10	12	37	41	30	Playoffs
7	Sarıyer Bld	22	10	12	38	46	30	Playoffs
8	İdman Ocağı	22	10	12	36	46	29	Playoffs
9	Çanakkale Bld	22	8	14	28	50	24	Play-out
10	İlbank	22	6	16	33	53	19	Play-out
11	Beşiktaş	22	4	18	25	58	13	Play-out
12	Yeşilyurt	22	0	22	8	66	1	Play-out

Source: Turkish Volleyball Federation

== Play-out ==
Pos	Team	Pld	W	L	SF	SA	Pts	Relegation
1	Çanakkale Bld	28	12	16	44	58	38	
2	İlbank	28	12	16	51	57	34	
3	Beşiktaş	28	6	22	33	70	19	Relegation to Turkish Women Volleyball Second League
4	Yeşilyurt	28	0	28	8	84	1	Relegation to Turkish Women Volleyball Second League

== Playoffs ==
Team 1	Agg.	Team 2	Game 1	Game 2	Game 3
VakıfBank (1)	2–0	İdman Ocağı (8)	3–1	3–0	
Fenerbahçe Grundig (2)	2–0	Sarıyer Bld (7)	3–0	3–0	
Eczacıbaşı VitrA (3)	2–0	Bursa BŞB (6)	3–1	3–0	
Galatasaray Daikin (4)	2–0	Nilüfer Bld (5)	3–0	3–1	

== Classification group ==
Pos	Team	Pld	W	L	SF	SA	Pts	BUR	IDM	NIL	SAR
5	Bursa BŞB	6	3	3	15	11	12		2–3	2–3	2–3
6	İdman Ocağı	6	4	2	13	10	10	0–3		1–3	3–0
7	Nilüfer Bld	6	3	3	14	12	10	1–3	2–3		3–0
8	Sarıyer Bld	6	2	4	7	16	4	1–3	0–3	3–2	

== Final group ==
Pos	Team	Pld	W	L	SF	SA	Pts	FEN	VAK	ECZ	GAL
1	Fenerbahçe Grundig	6	5	1	16	8	14		3–2	3–1	3–1
2	VakıfBank	6	3	3	13	10	11	0–3		3–0	3–1
3	Eczacıbaşı VitrA	6	3	3	10	12	8	3–1	0–3		3–0
4	Galatasaray Daikin	6	1	5	8	17	3	1–3	3–2	2–3	

Turkish Women's Volleyball League
2014–15 champions
Fenerbahçe Grundig
Fourth title

== Individual awards ==
Award	Player	Team
MVP	(South Korea) Yeon-Koung Kim	Fenerbahçe
Best Scorer	(South Korea) Yeon-Koung Kim	Fenerbahçe
Best Spiker	(South Korea) Yeon-Koung Kim	Fenerbahçe
Best Blocker	(Turkey) Kübra Akman	Vakıfbank
Best Server	(Netherlands) Floortje Meijners	Galatasaray
Best Setter	(Turkey) Naz Aydemir	Vakıfbank
Best Receiver	(Turkey) Gözde Kırdar	Vakıfbank
Best Libero	(Turkey) Gizem Örge	Vakıfbank
