= Trabzon İdmanocağı (women's volleyball) =

Trabzon İdmanocağı Women's Volleyball
- Short name: İdman Ocağı Women's Volleyball (İdman Ocağı Bayan Voleybol)
- Dissolved: 2018
- League: Turkish Women's Volleyball League
- 2016–17: Regular: 10th Play-out: 12th
- Website: Club home page

Trabzon İdmanocağı Women's Volleyball, or in short: İdman Ocağı Women's Volleyball (Turkish: İdman Ocağı Bayan Voleybol Takımı), is the women's volleyball team of the multi-sport club Trabzon İdmanocağı in Turkey. The team plays in the Turkish Women's First Volleyball League. In the 2015–16 season, the team was renamed after their sponsor Imperial Hastanesi İdmanocağı (Imperial Hospital İdmanocağı).

== Current squad ==
As of 2015–16 season.

- Manager: Gökhan Rahman Çokşen
- Assistant coach: Coşkun Karadeniz
- Assistant coach: İzzet Yiğit Alkılınç

Trabzon İdmanocağı Women's Volleyball
No.	Pos.	Player	Birth date and Age	Height	Spike	Block
1	S	(Turkey) Gizem Giraygil	May 8, 1986 (age 40)	1.80 m (5 ft 11 in)	275 cm (108 in)	285 cm (112 in)
2	MB	(Turkey) Sinem Barut	April 2, 1986 (age 40)	1.86 m (6 ft 1 in)	285 cm (112 in)	297 cm (117 in)
3	WS	(Serbia) Sanja Malagurski	June 8, 1990 (age 36)	1.91 m (6 ft 3 in)	292 cm (115 in)	305 cm (120 in)
4	MB	(Turkey) Beyza Arıcı	1990 (age 35–36)	1.91 m (6 ft 3 in)	294 cm (116 in)	306 cm (120 in)
5	L	(Turkey) Irmak Gürsoy	1991 (age 34–35)	1.62 m (5 ft 4 in)	227 cm (89 in)	235 cm (93 in)
6	MB	(Turkey) Fatma Duygu Sipahioğlu	October 31, 1979 (age 46)	1.87 m (6 ft 2 in)	286 cm (113 in)	294 cm (116 in)
7	WS	(Serbia) Jelena Blagojević	December 1, 1981 (age 44)	1.81 m (5 ft 11 in)	271 cm (107 in)	282 cm (111 in)
8	OH	(Turkey) Dilara Bilge	August 20, 1990 (age 35)	1.91 m (6 ft 3 in)	295 cm (116 in)	308 cm (121 in)
9	WS	(Turkey) Deniz Çetinsaraç	1983 (age 42–43)	1.87 m (6 ft 2 in)	280 cm (110 in)	292 cm (115 in)
10	L	(Turkey) Necla Güçlü Esepaşa	September 16, 1974 (age 51)	1.74 m (5 ft 9 in)	260 cm (100 in)	270 cm (110 in)
11	S	(Turkey) Ceren Çınar	1992 (age 33–34)	1.77 m (5 ft 10 in)	254 cm (100 in)	264 cm (104 in)
13	WS	(Bulgaria) Kremena Kamenova	May 21, 1988 (age 38)	1.85 m (6 ft 1 in)	290 cm (110 in)	295 cm (116 in)
14	MB	(Turkey) Emine Emel Kaplan	1983 (age 42–43)	1.88 m (6 ft 2 in)	291 cm (115 in)	299 cm (118 in)
16	S	(Poland) Agnieszka Rabka	August 30, 1978 (age 47)	1.78 m (5 ft 10 in)	290 cm (110 in)	294 cm (116 in)
18	WS	(Turkey) Gizem Nur Saka	1992 (age 33–34)	1.80 m (5 ft 11 in)	280 cm (110 in)	283 cm (111 in)
20	WS	(Serbia) Sonja Milanović	January 11, 1992 (age 34)	1.86 m (6 ft 1 in)	284 cm (112 in)	296 cm (117 in)

Legend

L-Libero, MB-Middle Blocker, OH-Opposite Hitter, S-Setter, WS-Wing Spiker.
