= Halkbank Ankara (women's volleyball) =

Turkish volleyball team

- Full name: Türkiye Halk Bankası Spor Kulübü
- Short name: Halkbank
- Founded: July 21, 1983
- Ground: Selim Sırrı Tarcan Sport Hall, Ankara (Capacity: 2,500)
- Chairman: Selahattin Süleymanoğlu
- League: Turkish Women's Volleyball League
- Website: Club home page

Uniforms
Home	Away

Halkbank Ankara women's volleyball is the women's volleyball department of Halkbank Ankara team based in Ankara, Turkey and sponsored by the state-owned Halkbank. It was founded on 21 July 1983 as Halkbank Spor Kulübü with blue, white and red colors. Halkbank Ankara plays in the Turkish Women's Volleyball League.

== Team roster ==
=== Current ===
Team for the 2017–2018 season.

As of 6 December 2017

Shirt No	Nationality	Player	Birth Date	Position
1	Cuba	Wilma Salas	9 May 1991 (age 35)	Wing-Spiker
2	Turkey	Ceyda Durukan	8 April 1984 (age 42)	Middle Blocker
5	Turkey	Yalcin Simge	23 December 1988 (age 37)	Setter
6	Turkey	Cayirgan Derya	9 October 1987 (age 38)	Libero
8	Turkey	Acarcesme Eylul	1 October 1999 (age 26)	Libero
9	Turkey	Dokuzlar Ezgi	11 November 1999 (age 26)	Opposite
10	Turkey	Fulden Ural	1 March 1991 (age 35)	Wing-Spiker
11	Turkey	Aslihan Kilic	21 April 1998 (age 28)	Setter
12	Turkey	Hande Naz Simsek	4 July 1995 (age 30)	Middle Blocker
14	Cuba	Rachel Sánchez	9 January 1989 (age 37)	Middle Blocker
15	Turkey	Neşve Büyükbayram	1 January 1990 (age 36)	Middle Blocker
16	Cuba	Daimí Ramírez (c)	8 October 1983 (age 42)	Wing-Spiker
17	Turkey	Tutku Burcu Yuzgenc	15 January 1999 (age 27)	Opposite
18	Turkey	Gulece Guder	21 January 1992 (age 34)	Setter
19	Turkey	kezban Ezgi Kara	27 December 2000 (age 25)	Middle-Blocker
