= Bursa Büyükşehir Bld. SK (women's volleyball) =

Bursa Büyükşehir Belediyespor Women's Volleyball
- Full name: Bursa Büyükşehir Belediyespor Women's Volleyball
- Short name: Bursa BBSK
- Ground: Cengiz Göllü Sports Hall; Bursa, Turkey
- League: Turkish Women's Volleyball League
- Website: Club home page

Uniforms
Home	Away

Bursa BBSK Women’s Volleyball is the women's volleyball department of Turkish sports club Bursa Büyükşehir Belediyespor based in Bursa. The team plays in the Turkish Women's Volleyball League, the top professional league in Turkey with home matches played at the Cengiz Göllü Sports Hall. The team has also participated in European competitions, winning the CEV Challenge Cup in the 2014–15 and 2016–17 editions.

== Honours ==
=== International competitions ===
- CEV Women's Challenge Cup
  - Champions (2): 2014–15; 2016–17

=== International frendlly competitions ===
- (Bulgaria) Plovdiv Cup
  - Champions (3): 2013, 2014, 2017

== Team squad ==
Season 2017–2018, as of October 2017.

Number	Player	Position	Height (m)	Weight (kg)	Birth date
1	(Turkey) Yaren Hatipoğlu	Outside hitter	1.81	60	23 February 1999 (age 27)
2	(Turkey) Aylin Sarıoğlu	Libero	1.68	55	21 July 1995 (age 31)
3	(Turkey) Gizem Güreşen	Libero	1.68	52	14 January 1987 (age 39)
5	(Turkey) Ergül Avcı	Middle blocker	1.90	72	24 January 1987 (age 39)
6	(Belgium) Charlotte Leys	Outside hitter	1.84	78	18 April 1989 (age 37)
7	(Turkey) Fatma Yıldırım	Outside hitter	1.80	55	3 January 1990 (age 36)
9	(Netherlands) Yvon Beliën	Middle blocker	1.88	73	28 December 1993 (age 32)
10	(Russia) Anastassia Bytsenko	Opposite	1.91	65	13 June 1984 (age 42)
11	(Turkey) Nilay Karaağaç	Setter	1.76	52	3 February 1991 (age 35)
12	(Turkey) Asli Tecimer	Middle blocker	1.91	70	6 February 1999 (age 27)
14	(Bulgaria) Emiliya Nikolova	Outside hitter	1.85	79	26 December 1991 (age 34)
15	(Turkey) Nurhan Ince	Setter	1.92	70	12 March 1985 (age 41)
16	(Turkey) Merve İkbal Albayrak	Middle blocker	1.82	62	15 October 1991 (age 34)
17	(Turkey) cansu aydınoğulları	Setter	1.81	55	18 February 1992 (age 34)
Coach: (Serbia) Angela Vercesi

== See also ==
- Turkish women in sports
