= Turkish Women's Volleyball Cup =

Women's volleyball tournament

Kupa Voley Kadınlar
- Formerly: Türkiye Kupası
- Sport: Volleyball
- Founded: 1994
- No. of teams: 14
- Country: Turkey
- Confederation: (European Union) CEV
- Most recent champion: VakıfBank (10th title)
- Most titles: VakıfBank (10 titles each)
- Sponsor: AXA Sigorta
- Domestic cups: Turkish Volleyball League; Turkish SuperCup
- Website: tvf.org.tr/icerikler/kupa-voley

The Turkish Women's Volleyball Cup (Turkish: Kupa Voley Kadınlar), officially known as AXA Sigorta Kupa Voley Kadınlar for sponsorship reasons, is a national cup for professional women's volleyball in Turkey, organized by the Turkish Volleyball Federation since the 1994-95 season. Between 2003 and 2008, the event was not held for five consecutive seasons. The cup was sponsored in the 2012-13 season by Teledünya, a digital cable TV and internet service owned by Türksat. The current sponsor is AXA Sigorta since 2018.

The most successful teams of the Turkish Women's Volleyball Cup are Eczacıbaşı and Vakıfbank, with nine titles each.

== Champions ==
Season	Champions
1994–95	Vakıfbank
1995–96	Emlak Bankası
1996–97	Vakıfbank
1997–98	Vakıfbank
1998–99	Eczacıbaşı
1999–2000	Eczacıbaşı
2000–01	Eczacıbaşı
2001–02	Eczacıbaşı
2002–03	Eczacıbaşı
2003–04	Not held
2004–05	Not held
2005–06	Not held
2006–07	Not held
2007–08	Not held
2008–09	Eczacıbaşı
2009–10	Fenerbahçe
2010–11	Eczacıbaşı
2011–12	Eczacıbaşı
2012–13	Vakıfbank
2013–14	Vakıfbank
2014–15	Fenerbahçe
2015–16	Not held
2016–17	Fenerbahçe
2017–18	Vakıfbank
2018–19	Eczacıbaşı
2019–20	Not held
2020–21	Vakıfbank
2021–22	Vakıfbank
2022–23	Vakıfbank
2023–24	Fenerbahçe
2024–25	Fenerbahçe
2025–26	Vakıfbank

== Performance by club ==
Club	Championships
Vakıfbank	10
Eczacıbaşı	9
Fenerbahçe	5
Emlak Bankası	1

== MVP by Edition ==
- 2014 - Gözde Kırdar (TUR)
- 2015 - Kim Yeon-koung (KOR)
- 2017 - Eda Erdem (TUR)
- 2018 - Zhu Ting (CHN)
- 2019 - Tijana Bošković (SRB)
- 2021 - Zehra Güneş (TUR)
- 2022 - Isabelle Haak (SWE)
- 2023 - Paola Egonu (ITA)
- 2024 - Melissa Vargas (TUR)
- 2025 - Melissa Vargas (TUR)
- 2026 - Marina Markova (RUS)

== See also ==
  - Men's
- Turkish Men's Volleyball League
- Turkish Men's Volleyball Cup
- Turkish Men's Volleyball Super Cup
  - Women's
- Turkish Women's Volleyball League
- Turkish Women's Volleyball Cup
- Turkish Women's Volleyball Super Cup
