= Nilüfer Belediyespor (women's volleyball) =

- Full name: Nilüfer Belediyespor Women's Volleyball Team
- Founded: 1999
- Ground: Bursa Atatürk Sport Hall (Capacity: 3,000)
- Chairman: (Turkey) Naci Kale
- Manager: (Turkey) Ali Kamberoğlu
- League: Sultanlar Ligi
- 2024–25: 12th
- Website: Club home page

Nilüfer Belediyespor Women’s Volleyball is the women's volleyball section of Turkish sports club Nilüfer Belediyespor in Bursa, Turkey. Founded in 1999 in Nilüfer district, the team is playing its home matches at the Bursa Atatürk Sport Hall.

== International success ==
- BVA Cup:
  - Winners (1): 2011

== Current squad ==
| No. | Player | Birth date | Height (m) | Position | Country |
|---|---|---|---|---|---|
| 1 | Elif Boran | 1992-10-02 | 1.86 | Opposite hitter | Turkey |
| 2 | Sinem Bayazit | 1999-1-14 | 1.68 | Wing-Spike | Turkey |
| 3 | Birgül Güler | 1990-5-2 | 1.80 | Wing-Spiker | Turkey |
| 4 | Seda Menekşe | 1997-7-8 | 1.85 | Wing-Spiker | Turkey |
| 5 | Elif Onur Başaran | 1989-12-20 | 1.85 | Wing-Spiker | Turkey |
| 6 | Özgenur Yurtdagülen | 1993-8-06 | 1.91 | Middle-Blocker | Turkey |
| 7 | Selin Arifoğlu | 1992-8-18 | 1.85 | Middle-Blocker | Turkey |
| 8 | Funda Bilgi | 1983-04-06 | 1.68 | Libero | Turkey |
| 10 | Merve Tanil | 1990-02-22 | 1.79 | Setter | Turkey |
| 11 | Anne Buijs | 1991-12-02 | 1.91 | Wing-Spiker | Netherlands |
| 15 | Ana Carolina da Silva | 1991-04-08 | 1.85 | Middle-Blocker | Brazil |
| 16 | Aylin Kurtulus | 2001-04-10 | 1.78 | Wing-Spiker | Turkey |
| 17 | Ceyda Aktaş | 1994-08-18 | 1.90 | Opposite hitter | Turkey |
| 18 | Duygu Düzceler | 1990-04-06 | 1.78 | Setter | Turkey |
