= TVF Burhan Felek Sport Hall =

Volleyball arena in Istanbul, Turkey

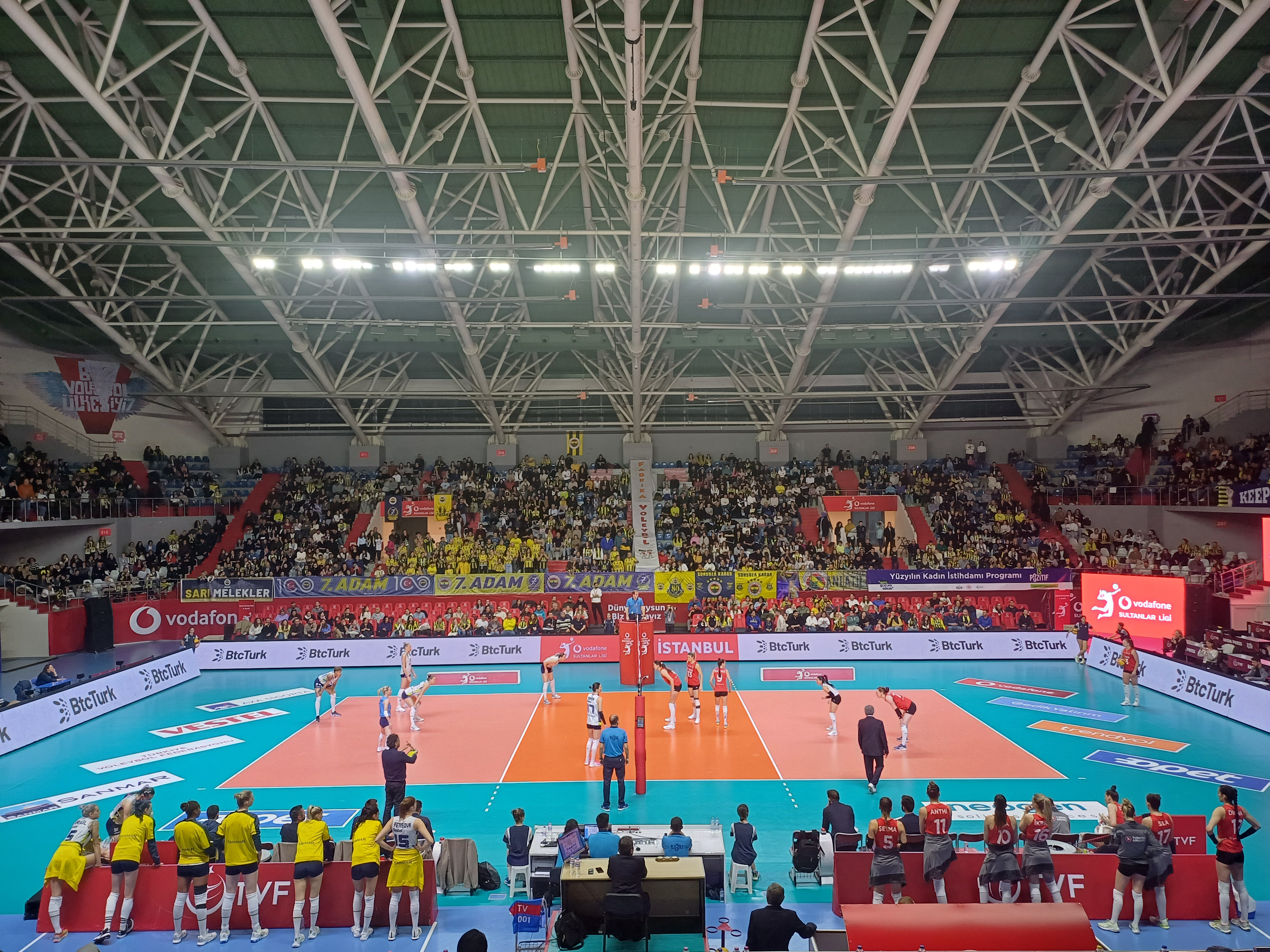
- Interactive map of TVF Burhan Felek Sport Hall
- Full name: Turkish Volleyball Federation Burhan Felek Sport Hall
- Location: Üsküdar, Istanbul
- Coordinates: 41.014201°N 29.031614°E
- Owner: Municipality of Kadıköy District
- Operator: Directorate of Youth and Sport of Istanbul Province
- Capacity: 7,000

Construction
- Built: 6 March 2010
- Opened: 19 November 2010

Tenants
- (Women's Volleyball); Galatasaray HDI Sigorta; Fenerbahçe Opet; Yeşilyurt Women's Volleyball Team; THY (Men's Volleyball); Galatasaray HDI Sigorta; Fenerbahçe HDI Sigorta

TVF Burhan Felek Sport Hall (Turkish: Burhan Felek Spor Salonu) is a volleyball arena located in Üsküdar district of Istanbul, Turkey and reopened on 19 November 2010. It is owned by the Municipality of Kadıköy District and operated by the Directorate of Youth and Sport of Istanbul Province.

The women's volleyball teams, Galatasaray HDI Sigorta, Fenerbahçe Opet; men's volleyball teams Galatasaray HDI Sigorta and Fenerbahçe HDI Sigorta play their league matches.

== Burhan Felek Volleyball Stadium ==
Burhan Felek Volleyball Stadium hosted the following volleyball matches:

Date	Tournament	Team #1	Result	Team #2	Round	Attendance
19 March 2011	Women's CEV Champions League	Fenerbahçe	2–3	Vakıfbank	Semifinal	6,800
20 March 2011	Women's CEV Champions League	Vakıfbank	3–0	Baku	Final	6,800
29 February 2012	Women's CEV Champions League	Fenerbahçe	3–0	Baku	Quarterfinal	5.212
20 March 2011	Women's CEV Champions League	Fenerbahçe	3–1	Pesaro	Third place game	5.000
19 March 2011	Women's CEV Champions League	Baku	3–1	Pesaro	Semifinal	4.000
27 March 2012	Women's CEV Cup	Galatasaray	3–1	Yamamay	Final	3.737
1 February 2012	Women's CEV Cup	Galatasaray	3–0	AEK Athens	Quarterfinal	3.000

== See also ==
- List of indoor arenas in Turkey
