= Özlem Güven =

Turkish volleyball player (born 1997)

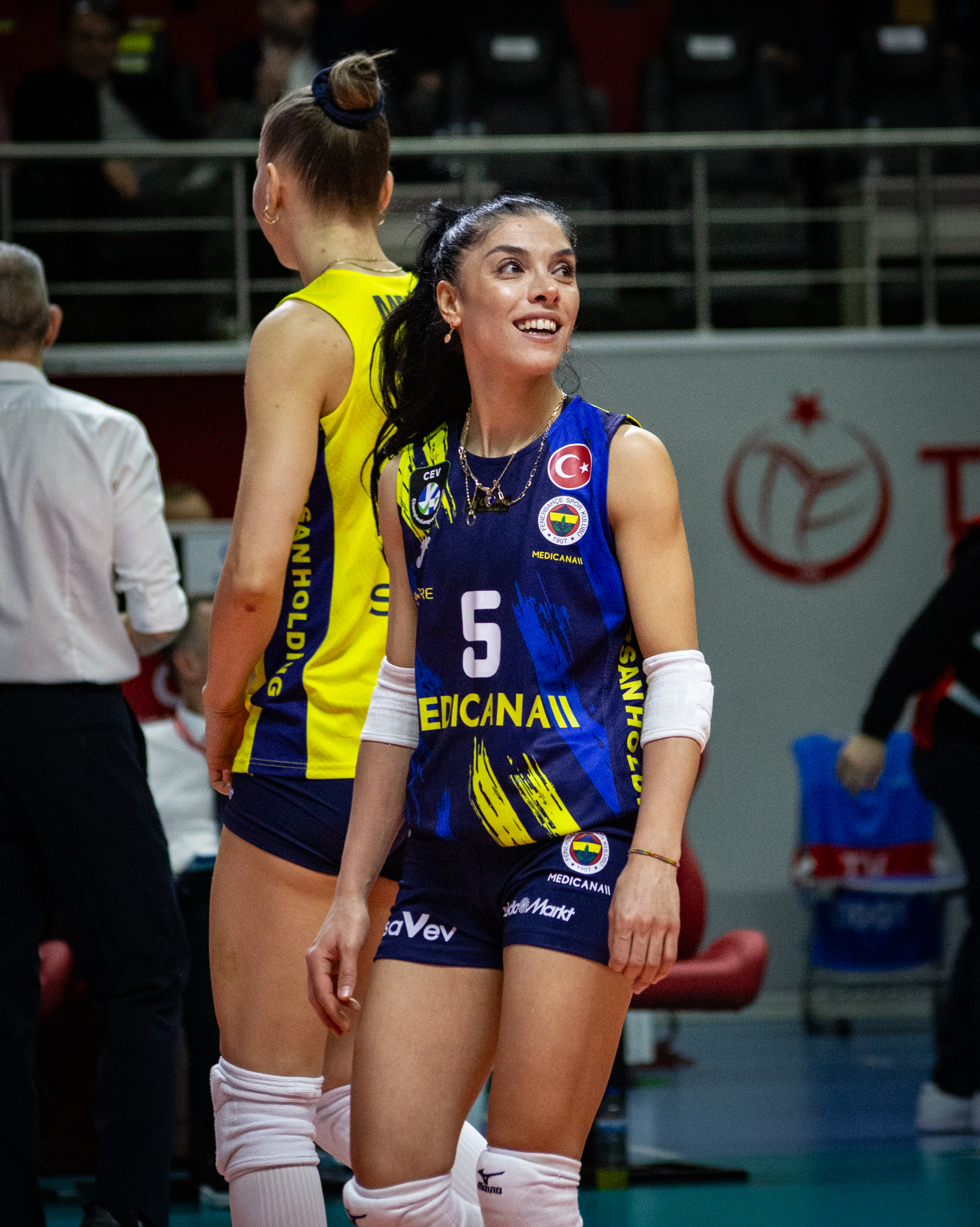
- Özlem Güven in 2025

Personal information
- Born: 1 October 1997 (age 29) Elazığ, Turkey
- Height: 1.65 m (5 ft 5 in)

Volleyball information
- Position: Libero
- Current club: Zeren Spor Kulübü
- Number: 5

Özlem Güven (born 1 October 1997 in Elazığ) is a Turkish volleyball player. She is 165 cm (5.41 ft) tall, plays as a libero, and wears number 5. She plays for Fenerbahçe Medicana of CEV Champions League and Vodafone Sultanlar Ligi.

== Career ==
Güven's career entails the following:

- Elazığ DSİ (2016–17)
- Elazığ İl Özel İdare (2017–18)
- Mardin Büyükşehir Belediyespor (2018–20)
- Çukurova Belediyespor (2020–21)
- Bolu Belediyespor (2021–22)
- Aydın Büyükşehir Belediyespor (2022–23)
- PTT (2023–24)
- Fenerbahçe Medicana (2024–2025)
- Zeren Spor Kulübü (2025–)

== Awards ==
- 2024 Turkish Super Cup – Gold (with Fenerbahçe Medicana)
- 2024–25 Turkish Volleyball Cup – Gold (with Fenerbahçe)

== See also ==
- Turkish women in sports
