= Mariia Fedorovtseva =

Russian rhythmic gymnast (born 2007)

- Full name: Mariia Sergeevna Fedorovtseva
- Born: 24 February 2007 (age 19) Moscow, Russia

Gymnastics career
- Discipline: Rhythmic gymnastics
- Country represented: Russia; Authorised Neutral Athletes (since 2026) (2021)
- Gym: Novogorsk
- Head coach: Tatiana Sergaeva
- Assistant coaches: Anna Epifanova, Maria Tolkacheva
- Former coach: Irina Viner
Medal record
Representing Authorised Neutral Athletes
Group rhythmic Gymnastics
Event / 1st / 2nd / 3rd; World Cup / 2 / 1 / 0
Representing Russia
Junior European Championships
Gold medal – first place	2021 Varna	Group All-around
Gold medal – first place	2021 Varna	5 Balls
Gold medal – first place	2021 Varna	5 Ribbons

Mariia Fedorovtseva (Russian: Мария Федоровцева; born 24 February 2007) is a Russian group rhythmic gymnast. She is the 2021 European junior group all-around champion.

== Personal life ==
She is daughter of Sergey Fedorovtsev, Olympic gold medalist in rowing, and Ekaterina Fedorovtseva, who is also a rower. Her older sister Arina Fedorovtseva is a volleyball player who plays for Fenerbahçe.

== Career ==
Before joining the Russian national team, she trained at the Sever Sports School of Olympic Reserve under the guidance of Irina Kozharina and Oksana Skaldina.

=== Junior ===
Fedorovtseva joined the Russian national team in 2020. She won a gold medal in the group all-around at the 2021 Junior European Championships in Varna, Bulgaria, alongside her teammates Milena An, Anna Grosh, Sofiia Iakovleva, Nonna Nianina and Elizaveta Tataeva. They also won the gold medal in both finals.

=== Senior ===
She won a gold medal in the 5 hoops final at the 2024 BRICS Games in Kazan, Russia.

In 2026, World Gymnastics allowed Russian athletes to start competing under the neutral flag, representing Authorised Neutral Athletes. On 28-30 March, Fedorovtseva and her teammates (Sabina Baiburina, Amina Idrisova, Nonna Nianina, Alina Rusanova, Ekaterina Timoshenko) made their international debut competing at the Sofia World Cup. They won the gold medal in the group all-around and the 3 hoops + 4 clubs final, and they also won the silver medal in the 5 balls final.
