= Nonna Nianina =

Russian rhythmic gymnast (born 2006)

- Full name: Nonna Gennadievna Nianina
- Born: 20 January 2006 (age 20) Simferopol, Crimea, Ukraine

Gymnastics career
- Discipline: Rhythmic gymnastics
- Country represented: Russia; Authorised Neutral Athletes (since 2026) (2021)
- Gym: Novogorsk
- Head coach: Tatiana Sergaeva
- Assistant coaches: Anna Epifanova, Maria Tolkacheva
- Former coaches: Irina Viner, Irina Abramova, Oksana Rizatdinova
Medal record
Representing Authorised Neutral Athletes
Group rhythmic Gymnastics
Event / 1st / 2nd / 3rd; World Cup / 2 / 1 / 0
Representing Russia
Junior European Championships
Gold medal – first place	2021 Varna	Group All-around
Gold medal – first place	2021 Varna	5 Balls
Gold medal – first place	2021 Varna	5 Ribbons

Nonna Nianina (Russian: Нонна Нянина; born 20 January 2006) is a Russian group rhythmic gymnast. She is the 2021 European junior group all-around champion.

== Career ==
Nianina took up gymnastics at the age of 3. She trained under the guidance of Irina Abramova at the Olympic Reserve School of Rhythmic Gymnastics of the Republic of Crimea.

=== Junior ===
Nianina joined the Russian national team in 2020. She won gold in the group all-around at the 2021 Junior European Championships in Varna, Bulgaria, alongside her teammates Milena An, Anna Grosh, Sofiia Iakovleva, Mariia Fedorovtseva and Elizaveta Tataeva . They also won the gold medal in both finals.

=== Senior ===
She won a gold medal in 5 the hoops event at the 2024 BRICS Games in Kazan, Russia.

In 2026, World Gymnastics allowed Russian athletes to start competing under the neutral flag, representing Authorised Neutral Athletes. On 28-30 March, Nianina and her teammates (Sabina Baiburina, Amina Idrisova, Mariia Fedorovtseva, Alina Rusanova, Ekaterina Timoshenko) made their international debut competing at the Sofia World Cup. They won the gold medal in the group all-around and the 3 hoops + 4 clubs final, and they won the silver medal in the 5 balls final.
