= Elif Ağca Yarar =

Turkish volleyball player (born 1984)

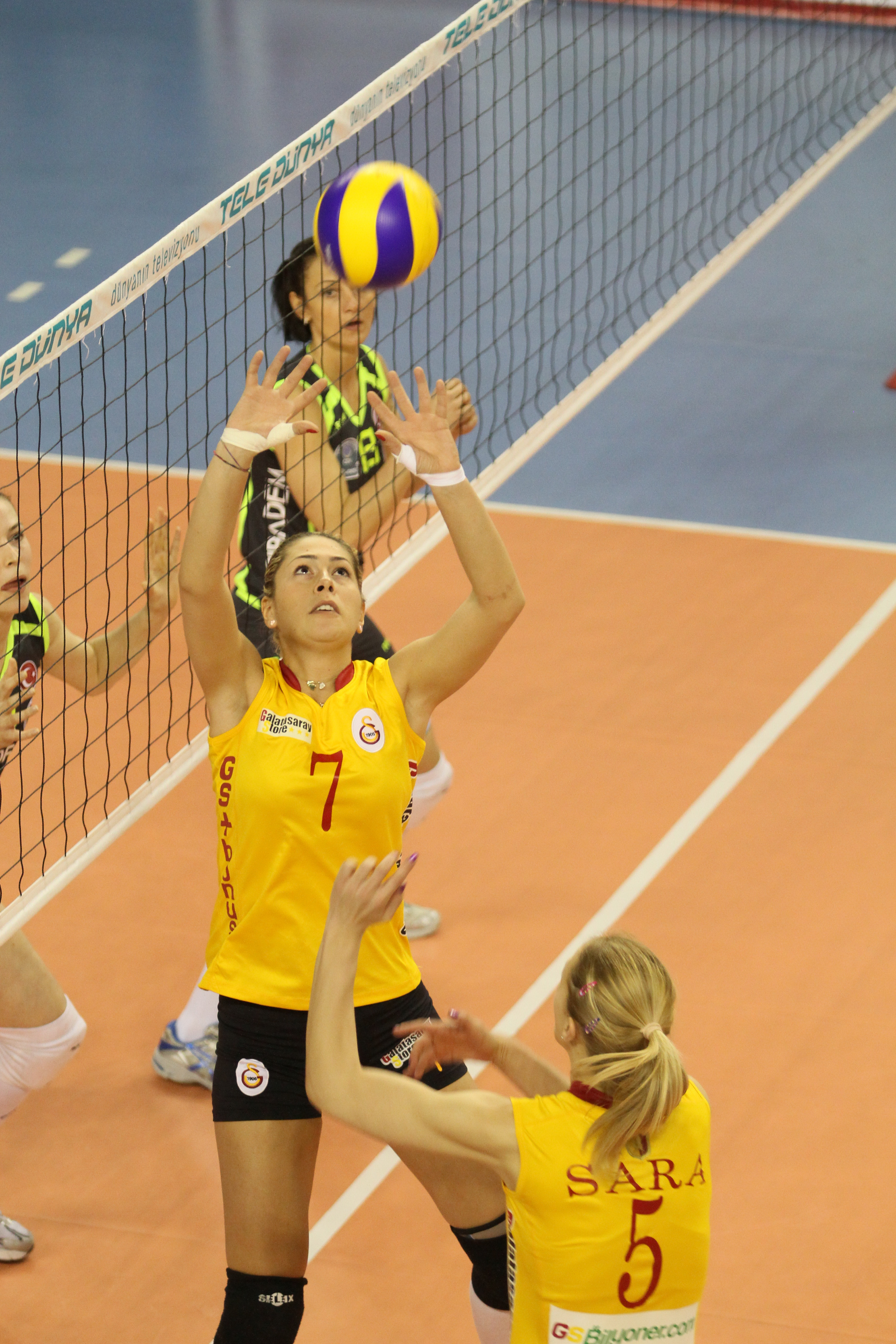

Personal information
- Full name: Nedime Elif Ağca Yarar; Nedime Elif Ağca
- Born: Nedime Elif Ağca; February 10, 1984 (age 42); Ankara, Turkey
- Height: 1.86 m (6 ft 1 in)

Volleyball information
- Position: Setter
- Current club: retired

Career
Years	Teams
2001-2007; 2007-2008; 2008-2009; 2009-2010; 2010-2012; 2012-2014	VakıfBank Güneş Sigorta; RC Cannes; VakıfBank Güneş Sigorta; Galatasaray Medical Park; Eczacıbaşı Zentiva; Fenerbahçe

National team
2005-2014	Turkey
Medal record
Women's volleyball
Representing Turkey
Mediterranean Games
Gold medal – first place	2005 Almeria	Team

Nedime Elif Ağca Yarar (born February 10, 1984, in Ankara), also known as Nedime Elif Ağca Öner, is a retired national level Turkish volleyball player who last played for Fenerbahçe. She is 186 cm (6 ft 1 in) tall and plays as setter. She studied at Marmara University.

== Career ==
Since the 2012/2013 season, she plays for the Turkish club Fenerbahçe. She represented the club in the 2012 FIVB Club World Championship and won the bronze medal and the Best Setter award after defeating Puerto Rico's Lancheras de Cataño 3-0.

== Clubs ==
- (Turkey) VakıfBank Güneş Sigorta (2001-2007)
- (France) RC Cannes (2007-2008)
- (Turkey) VakıfBank Güneş Sigorta (2008-2009)
- (Turkey) Galatasaray (2009-2010)
- (Turkey) Eczacıbaşı VitrA (2010-2012)
- (Turkey) Fenerbahçe (2012-2014)

== Awards ==
=== Individuals ===
- 2012 FIVB Women's Club World Championship "Best Setter"

=== Clubs ===
- 2004 Turkish League - Champion, with VakıfBank Güneş Sigorta
- 2004 CEV Top Teams Cup - Champion, with VakıfBank Güneş Sigorta
- 2005 Turkish League - Champion, with VakıfBank Güneş Sigorta
- 2007-08 French Cup - Champion, with RC Cannes
- 2007-08 French League - Champion, with RC Cannes
- 2011 Turkish Cup - Champion, with Eczacıbaşı VitrA
- 2012 Turkish League - Champion, with Eczacıbaşı VitrA
- 2012 FIVB Women's Club World Championship – Bronze Medal, with Fenerbahçe
- 2012-13 CEV Cup - Runner-Up, with Fenerbahçe
- 2013-14 CEV Cup - Champion, with Fenerbahçe
- 2015 Turkish Cup - Champion, with Fenerbahçe
- 2014–15 Turkish Women's Volleyball League - Champion, with Fenerbahçe Grundig

=== National team ===
- 2005 Mediterranean Games - Gold Medal

== See also ==
- Turkish women in sports

Awards
Preceded by (Ukraine) Iryna Zhukova	Best Setter of FIVB Club World Championship; 2012	Succeeded by (China) Shen Jingsi
