= Katja Wühler =

German volleyball player

Personal information
- Nationality: German
- Born: 19 January 1979 (age 47); Erfurt
- Height: 1.87 m (6 ft 2 in)
- Weight: 73 kg (161 lb)
- Spike: 302 cm (119 in)
- Block: 290 cm (110 in)

Volleyball information
- Number: 7

Career
Years	Teams
2003	(Germany) Rote Raben Vilsbiburg

National team
2004	Germany Germany
Honours
Women's volleyball

Katja Wühler (born 19 January 1979 in Erfurt) is a German volleyball player. She was a member of the Germany women's national volleyball team. She participated in the 2003 FIVB World Grand Prix.

== Club ==
Katja Wühler started volleyball in her hometown of Erfurt before joining Bundesliga club Dresdner SC in 1995. In 1999, they were German champion and winner of the DVV Cup. In 2001, the universal player moved to the Rote Raben Vilsbiburg, with whom she became German champion in 2008. In 2009, she won the DVV Cup, became German runner-up and reached the Final Four at the 2008–09 Women's CEV Cup. In 2010, Katja Wühler repeated with the Red Ravens, the German championship and then ended hir active career.

Today Katja Wühler works for the Red Ravens in the office and as a trainer.
