= Duygu Bal =

Turkish volleyball player (born 1987)

Personal information
- Born: March 25, 1987 (age 39); Ankara, Turkey
- Height: 1.90 m (6 ft 3 in)
- Weight: 73 kg (161 lb)
- Spike: 305 cm (120 in)
- Block: 275 cm (108 in)

Volleyball information
- Position: Middle Blocker

National team
Turkey

Duygu Bal (born March 25, 1987) is a retired Turkish volleyball player.

== Volleyball career ==
She is 190 cm and played as a middle blocker. She has also played for Emlak Toki, VakıfBank Güneş Sigorta, VakıfBank Güneş Sigorta Türk Telekom, Fenerbahçe from Turkey and Riso Scotti Pavia from Italy.

In November 2014 Duygu Bal announced her retirement from volleyball

== Education ==
She graduated from Ankara University's Faculty of Health Education.

== Career ==
- 2006-07 (Turkey) Emlak Toki
- 2007-09 (Turkey) VakıfBank Güneş Sigorta
  - 2008 Women's Top Volley International Champion
  - 2007-08 Challenge Cup Champion
- 2009-10 (Turkey) VakıfBank Güneş Sigorta Türk Telekom
- 2010-11 (Italy) Riso Scotti Pavia
- 2011-13 (Turkey) Fenerbahçe Universal

== Awards ==
- 2011-12 CEV Champions League - Champion
- 2012-13 CEV Cup - Runner-Up, with Fenerbahçe

== See also ==
- Turkish women in sports
