= Turkish Women's Volleyball Super Cup =

Women's volleyball super cup competition in Turkey

Turkish Women's Volleyball Super Cup Türkiye Voleybol Kadınlar Şampiyonlar Kupası
- Current season, competition or edition: 2026 Turkish Women's Volleyball Super Cup
- Sport: Volleyball
- Founded: 2009
- No. of teams: 2
- Country: Turkey
- Confederation: CEV
- Most recent champion: VakıfBank (6th title)
- Most titles: Fenerbahçe, VakıfBank (6 titles)
- Related competitions: Turkish Women's Volleyball League; Turkish Women's Volleyball Cup
- Website: www.tvf.org.tr

The Turkish Women's Volleyball Super Cup (Turkish: Türkiye Voleybol Kadınlar Şampiyonlar Kupası) is the super cup competition for professional women's volleyball in Turkey. It has been organised by the Turkish Volleyball Federation since 2009. The competition is contested between the winners of the Turkish Women's Volleyball League and the Turkish Women's Volleyball Cup.

As of 2026, the most successful club in the competition is VakıfBank, with six titles.

== Finals ==
Year	Winners	Result	Runners-up	Source
2009	(Turkey) Fenerbahçe Acıbadem	3–1	(Turkey) Eczacıbaşı Zentiva	
2010	(Turkey) Fenerbahçe Acıbadem	3–1	(Turkey) VakıfBank Güneş Sigorta Türk Telekom	
2011	(Turkey) Eczacıbaşı VitrA	3–1	(Turkey) Fenerbahçe Universal	
2012	(Turkey) Eczacıbaşı VitrA	3–0	(Turkey) Galatasaray Daikin	
2013	(Turkey) VakıfBank	3–2	(Turkey) Eczacıbaşı VitrA	
2014	(Turkey) VakıfBank	3–0	(Turkey) Fenerbahçe Grundig	
2015	(Turkey) Fenerbahçe Grundig	3–2	(Turkey) VakıfBank	
2016	Not held			
2017	(Turkey) VakıfBank	3–0	(Turkey) Fenerbahçe	
2018	(Turkey) Eczacıbaşı VitrA	3–1	(Turkey) VakıfBank	
2019	(Turkey) Eczacıbaşı VitrA	3–2	(Turkey) VakıfBank	
2020	(Turkey) Eczacıbaşı VitrA	3–2	(Turkey) VakıfBank	
2021	(Turkey) VakıfBank	3–0	(Turkey) Eczacıbaşı VitrA	
2022	(Turkey) Fenerbahçe Opet	3–0	(Turkey) VakıfBank	
2023	(Turkey) VakıfBank	3–2	(Turkey) Fenerbahçe Opet	
2024	(Turkey) Fenerbahçe Medicana	3–1	(Turkey) Eczacıbaşı Dynavit	
2025	(Turkey) Fenerbahçe Medicana	3–2	(Turkey) VakıfBank	
2026	(Turkey) VakıfBank	3–2	(Turkey) Eczacıbaşı Dynavit	

== Performance by club ==
Club	Winners	Runners-up	Years won
(Turkey) Fenerbahçe	6	4	2009, 2010, 2015, 2022, 2024, 2025
(Turkey) VakıfBank	6	7	2013, 2014, 2017, 2021, 2023, 2026
(Turkey) Eczacıbaşı	5	5	2011, 2012, 2018, 2019, 2020
(Turkey) Galatasaray	0	1	—

== Most valuable player by edition ==
Year	Player	Club
2014	Gözde Kırdar (TUR)	(Turkey) VakıfBank
2015	Kim Yeon-koung (KOR)	(Turkey) Fenerbahçe Grundig
2017	Naz Aydemir (TUR)	(Turkey) VakıfBank
2018	Jordan Larson (USA)	(Turkey) Eczacıbaşı VitrA
2019	Tijana Bošković (SRB)	(Turkey) Eczacıbaşı VitrA
2020	Tijana Bošković (SRB)	(Turkey) Eczacıbaşı VitrA
2021	Cansu Özbay (TUR)	(Turkey) VakıfBank
2022	Arina Fedorovtseva (RUS)	(Turkey) Fenerbahçe Opet
2023	Jordan Thompson (USA)	(Turkey) VakıfBank
2024	Melissa Vargas (TUR)	(Turkey) Fenerbahçe Medicana
2025	Melissa Vargas (TUR)	(Turkey) Fenerbahçe Medicana

== See also ==
Men's:

- Turkish Men's Volleyball League
- Turkish Men's Volleyball Cup
- Turkish Men's Volleyball Super Cup

Women's:

- Turkish Women's Volleyball League
- Turkish Women's Volleyball Cup
- Turkish Women's Volleyball Super Cup
