= Nihan Güneyligil =

Turkish volleyball player

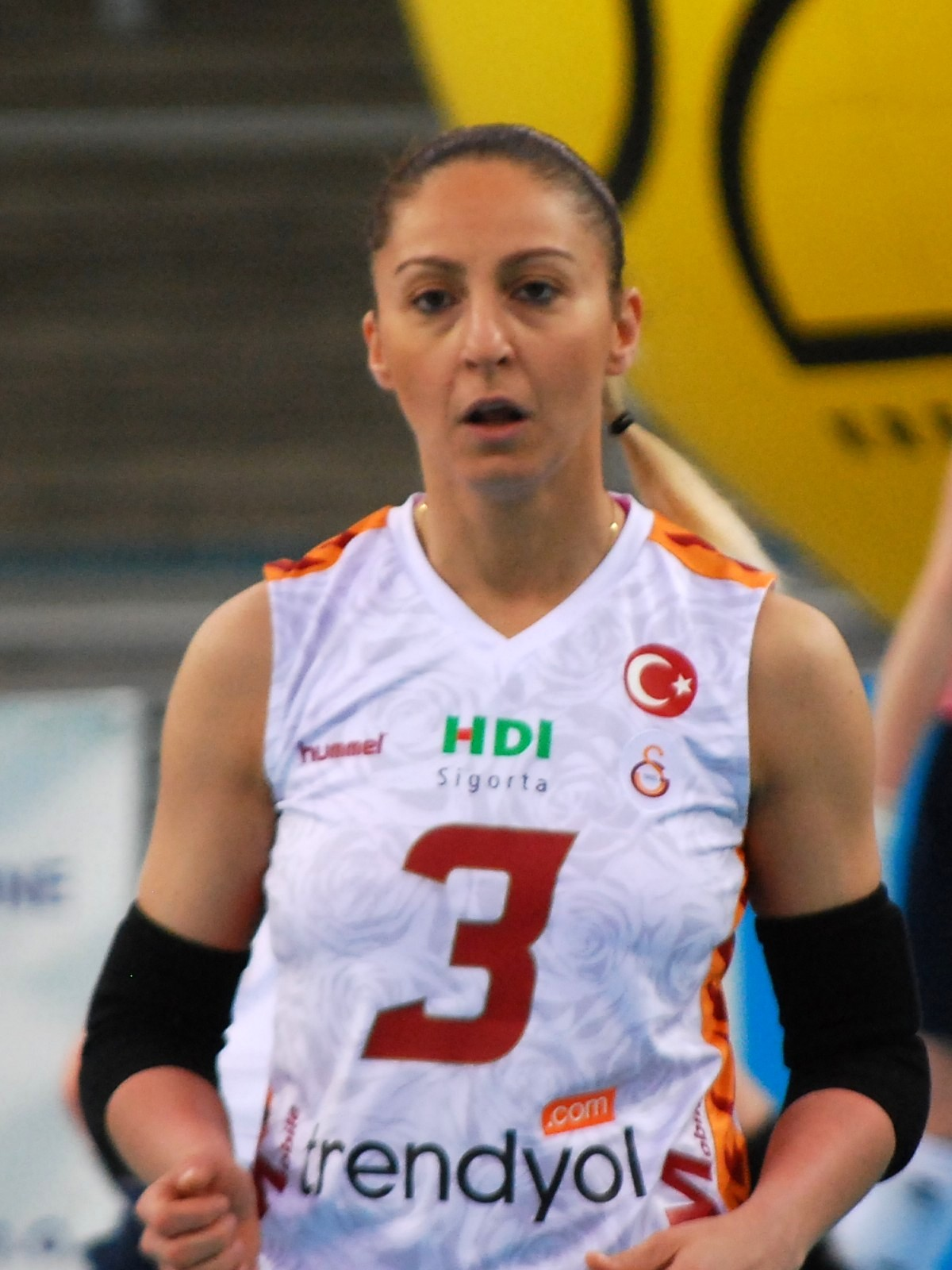

Personal information
- Full name: Nihan Yeldan Güneyligil
- Nationality: Turkey
- Born: February 7, 1982 (age 44); Istanbul, Turkey
- Hometown: Istanbul, Turkey
- Height: 1.72 m (5 ft 8 in)
- Weight: 60 kg (132 lb)
- Spike: 280 cm (110 in)
- Block: 276 cm (109 in)

Volleyball information
- Position: Libero
- Current club: (Turkey) Galatasaray Daikin
- Number: 3

National team
2007 -	Turkey
Medal record
Women's volleyball
Representing Turkey
European Volleyball League
Silver medal – second place	2009 Turkey	Team
Mediterranean Games
Silver medal – second place	2009 Pescara	Team
- Last updated: December 2010

Nihan Yeldan Güneyligil (born February 7, 1982) is a Turkish volleyball player. She is 172 cm and plays as libero. She plays for Galatasaray Daikin.

== Career ==
She signed a 3-year contract with Fenerbahçe in June 2009. She also played for VakıfBank. She won Turkish League, Cup and Super Cup championship with Fenerbahçe in 2009–10 season.

Nihan has won the gold, silver and bronze medal at the Women's CEV Champions League with Fenerbahçe Universal.

Güneyligil played with Fenerbahçe in the 2012 FIVB Club World Championship held in Doha, Qatar and helped her team to win the bronze medal after defeating Puerto Rico's Lancheras de Cataño 3–0.

== Clubs ==
- (Turkey) VakıfBank (1992–1999)
- (Turkey) Bursaspor (1999–2001)
- (Turkey) Beşiktaş Istanbul (2001–2006)
- (Turkey) Vakıfbank (2006–2009)
- (Turkey) Fenerbahçe (2009–2011)
- (Turkey) Fenerbahçe (2011–2012)
- (Turkey) Fenerbahçe (2012–2013)
- (Turkey) Galatasaray Daikin (2013–2017)

== Awards ==
=== Clubs ===
- 2003–04 CEV Cup – Champion, with VakıfBank
- 2009–10 Aroma Women's Volleyball League – Champion, with Fenerbahçe
- 2009–10 Turkish Cup – Runner-up, with Fenerbahçe
- 2010 Turkish Super Cup – Champion, with Fenerbahçe
- 2009–10 CEV Champions League – Runner-up, with Fenerbahçe
- 2010 FIVB World Club Championship – Champion, with Fenerbahçe
- 2010–11 CEV Champions League – Bronze medal, with Fenerbahçe
- 2010–11 Aroma Women's Volleyball League – Champion, with Fenerbahçe
- 2011–12 CEV Champions League – Champion, with Fenerbahçe
- 2012 FIVB Women's Club World Championship – Bronze Medal, with Fenerbahçe
- 2012–13 CEV Cup – Runner-up, with Fenerbahçe

== See also ==
- Turkish women in sports
