= 2008–09 Women's CEV Cup =

- League: Women's CEV Cup
- Sport: Volleyball

Women's CEV Cup seasons
- ← 2007–08 2009–10 →

The 2008–09 Women's CEV Cup was the 37th edition of the European Women's CEV Cup volleyball club tournament, the former Top Teams Cup.

== Teams of the 2008–2009 ==
The number of participants on the basis of ranking list for European Cup Competitions

Rank	Country	The number of teams	Teams	
1	Italy	1	Asystel Novara	
2	Russia	2	Spartak Omsk	Uralochka NTMK Ekaterinburg
3	Spain	1	CV Albacete	
4	France	2	Rocheville Le Cannet	USSP Albi
5	Poland	1	Aluprof Bielsko-Biała	
6	Netherlands	2	Longa'59 Lichtenvoorde	Sliedrecht Sport
7	Switzerland	2	Zeiler Koniz	Kanti Schaffhausen
8	Turkey	2	Dyo Karsiyaka Izmir	Fenerbahçe Acıbadem Istanbul
9	Croatia	2	OTP Banka Pula	Pivovara Osijek
10	Portugal	2	Clube Desportivo Ribeirense	CS Madeira
11	Romania	2	Stiinta Bacau	Dinamo București
12	Belgium	2	Asterix Kieldrecht	Datovoc Tongeren
13	Ukraine	2	Jinestra Odesa	Krug Cherkasy
14	Slovakia	2	Doprastav Bratislava	Slavia UK Bratislava
15	Serbia	2	Dinamo Azotara Pančevo	Crvena Zvezda Belgrade
16	Azerbaijan	1	Azerrail Baku	
17	Greece	1	Panathinaikos Athens	
18	Austria	1	Sparkasse Klagenfurt	
20	Belarus	1	Atlant Baranovichi	
26	Germany	1	Rote Raben Vilsbiburg	

== Play-off ==
=== 1/16 Finals ===
- 1st leg 4–6 November 2008
- 2nd leg 11–13 November 2008

The 16 winning teams from the 1/16 Finals will compete in the 1/8 Finals playing Home & Away matches. The losers of the 1/16 Final matches will qualify for the 3rd round of the Challenge Cup.

Team #1	Results	Team #2
CV Albacete (Spain)	0 – 3 (23:25, 23:25, 21:25); 0 – 3 (20:25, 13:25, 14:25)	(Russia) Spartak Omsk
Zeiler Koniz (Switzerland)	3 – 1 (25:17, 15:25, 25:17, 25:14); 3 – 2 (19:25, 22:25, 25:17, 25:18, 15:11)	(Romania) Dinamo București
CS Madeira (Portugal)	2 – 3 (31:29, 25:21, 15:25, 12:25, 9:15); 2 – 3 (25:21, 25:22, 12:25, 14:25, 10:15)	(Belarus) Atlant Baranovichi
Datovoc Tongeren (Belgium)	0 – 3 (18:25, 18:25, 10:25); 0 – 3 (20:25, 15:25, 14:25)	(Turkey) Fenerbahçe Acıbadem Istanbul
Asystel Novara (Italy)	3 – 0 (25:17, 25:11, 25:21); 3 – 0 (25:20, 25:17, 25:12)	(Austria) Sparkasse Klagenfurt
Stiinta Bacau (Romania)	3 – 0 (25:20, 25:23, 25:23); 3 – 0 (25:19, 25:21, 27:25)	(Slovakia) Slavia UK Bratislava
Crvena Zvezda Belgrade (Serbia)	3 – 0 (25:22, 25:21, 25:20); 3 – 0 (25:20, 25:18, 25:19)	(Slovakia) Doprastav Bratislava
Dyo Karsiyaka Izmir (Turkey)	1 – 3 (17:25, 25:18, 19:25, 15:25); 0 – 3 (12:25, 15:25, 18:25)	(Netherlands) Sliedrecht Sport
Aluprof Bielsko-Biała (Poland)	3 – 1 (25:21, 24:26, 25:19, 25:15); 3 – 0 (25:17, 25:13, 25:14)	(Greece) Panathinaikos Athens
Dinamo Azotara Pančevo (Serbia)	3 – 0 (25:22, 25:19, 25:16); 0 – 3 (21:25, 24:26, 20:25); Golden Set: 15:13	(Ukraine) Krug Cherkasy
Azerrail Baku (Azerbaijan)	2 – 3 (22:25, 25:23, 25:15, 16:25, 15:17); 2 – 3 (25:22, 25:19, 17:25, 25:27, 13:15)	(Netherlands) Longa'59 Lichtenvoorde
Rocheville Le Cannet (France)	3 – 1 (25:20, 23:25, 25:21, 25:20); 0 – 3 (16:25, 18:25, 19:25)	(Russia) Uralochka-NTMK Yekaterinburg
Kanti Schaffhausen (Switzerland)	3 – 0 (25:17, 25:17, 25:14); 3 – 0 (25:14, 25:19, 25:13)	(Croatia) OTP Banka Pula
Clube Desportivo Ribeirense (Portugal)	3 – 0 (25:9, 25:17, 25:15); 2 – 3 (28:26, 25:22, 29:31, 19:25, 13:15))	(Croatia) Pivovara Osijek
Asterix Kieldrecht (Belgium)	0 – 3 (20:25, 9:25, 24:26); 1 – 3 (17:25, 7:25, 25:21, 16:25)	(Germany) Rote Raben Vilsbiburg
Jinestra Odesa (Ukraine)	3 – 1 (25:15, 23:25, 25:13, 25:20); 3 – 0 (25:22, 26:24, 25:15)	(France) USSP Albi

=== 1/8 Finals ===
- 1st leg 9–11 December 2008
- 2nd leg 16–18 December 2008

Team #1	Results	Team #2
Spartak Omsk (Russia)	3 – 0 (25:19, 25:19, 25:18); 3 – 0 (25:18, 25:22, 25:20)	(Switzerland) Zeiler Koniz
Atlant Baranovichi (Belarus)	1 – 3 (21:25, 18:25, 25:23, 17:25); 1 – 3 (16:25, 25:21, 13:25, 19:25)	(Turkey) Fenerbahçe Acıbadem
Asystel Novara (Italy)	3 – 0 (25:20, 25:17, 25:22); 3 – 0 (25:18, 25:11, 26:24)	(Romania) Stiinta Bacau
Crvena Zvezda Belgrade (Serbia)	3 – 0 (25:19, 25:16, 25:17); 1 – 3 (21:25, 25:15, 18:25, 20:25)	(Netherlands) Sliedrecht Sport
Aluprof Bielsko-Biała (Poland)	3 – 0 (25:17, 27:25, 25:13); 3 – 0 (25:17, 25:20, 25:14)	(Serbia) Dinamo Azotara Pančevo
Longa'59 Lichtenvoorde (Netherlands)	0 – 3 (20:25, 17:25, 11:25); 0 – 3 (15:25, 15:25, 20:25)	(Russia) Uralochka-NTMK Yekaterinburg
Kanti Schaffhausen (Switzerland)	2 – 3 (22:25, 25:18, 25:12, 24:26, 13:15); 3 – 0 (25:22, 25:17, 26:24)	(Portugal) Clube Desportivo Ribeirense
Rote Raben Vilsbiburg (Germany)	3 – 0 (25:21, 25:15, 25:15); 2 – 3 (25:20, 25:20, 23:25, 24:26, 10:15)	(Ukraine) Jinestra Odesa

=== 1/4 Finals ===
- 1st leg 13–14 January 2009
- 2nd leg 20–21 January 2009

Team #1	Results	Team #2
Spartak Omsk (Russia)	3 – 1 (17:25, 25:21, 25:16, 25:21); 0 – 3 (23:25, 13:25, 6:25)	(Turkey) Fenerbahçe Acıbadem
Asystel Novara (Italy)	3 – 1 (25:17, 27:29, 25:21, 25:15); 3 – 0 (25:23, 25:18, 25:22)	(Serbia) Crvena Zvezda Belgrade
Aluprof Bielsko-Biała (Poland)	0 – 3 (15:25, 19:25, 29:31); 0 – 3 (25:27, 23:25, 15:25)	(Russia) Uralochka-NTMK Yekaterinburg
Kanti Schaffhausen (Switzerland)	3 – 2 (23:25, 25:23, 19:25, 25:22, 16:14); 0 – 3 (17:25, 16:25, 21:25)	(Germany) Rote Raben Vilsbiburg

== Final four ==
Novara, 14 & 15 March 2009

Semi-finals
15 March
(Turkey) Fenerbahçe Acıbadem	0
(Italy) Asystel Novara	3
15 March
(Russia) Uralochka-NTMK Yekaterinburg	3
(Germany) Rote Raben Vilsbiburg	2

Final
16 March
(Italy) Asystel Novara	3
(Russia) Uralochka-NTMK Yekaterinburg	0
3rd place
16 March
(Turkey) Fenerbahçe Acıbadem	3
(Germany) Rote Raben Vilsbiburg	1

=== Semi-finals ===
March 14, 2009

	Score		Set 1	Set 2	Set 3	Set 4	Set 5
Fenerbahçe Acıbadem (TUR)	0–3	Asystel Novara (ITA)	18:25	22:25	22:25		
Uralochka-NTMK Yekaterinburg (RUS)	3–2	Rote Raben Vilsbiburg (GER)	25:19	26:24	25:27	15:25	15:8

=== 3rd Place ===
March 15, 2009

	Score		Set 1	Set 2	Set 3	Set 4	Set 5
Fenerbahçe Acıbadem (TUR)	3–1	Rote Raben Vilsbiburg (GER)	25:23	25:19	23:25	25:13	

=== Final ===
March 15, 2009

	Score		Set 1	Set 2	Set 3	Set 4	Set 5
Asystel Novara (ITA)	3–0	Uralochka-NTMK Yekaterinburg (RUS)	25:18	25:21	25:13		

=== Awards ===
Winners:

- MVP: (Italy) Cristina Barcellini (Asystel Novara)
- Best scorer: (Turkey) Seda Tokatlıoğlu (Fenerbahçe Acıbadem)
- Best server: (Russia) Maria Duskryadchenko (Uralochka-NTMK Yekaterinburg)
- Best spiker: (Germany) Katja Wühler (Rote Raben Vilsbiburg)
- Best blocker: (China) Kun Feng (Asystel Novara)
- Best setter: (China) Kun Feng (Asystel Novara)
- Best receiver: (Azerbaijan) Valeriya Korotenko (Fenerbahçe Acıbadem)
