= Arina Fedorovtseva =

Russian volleyball player (born 2004)

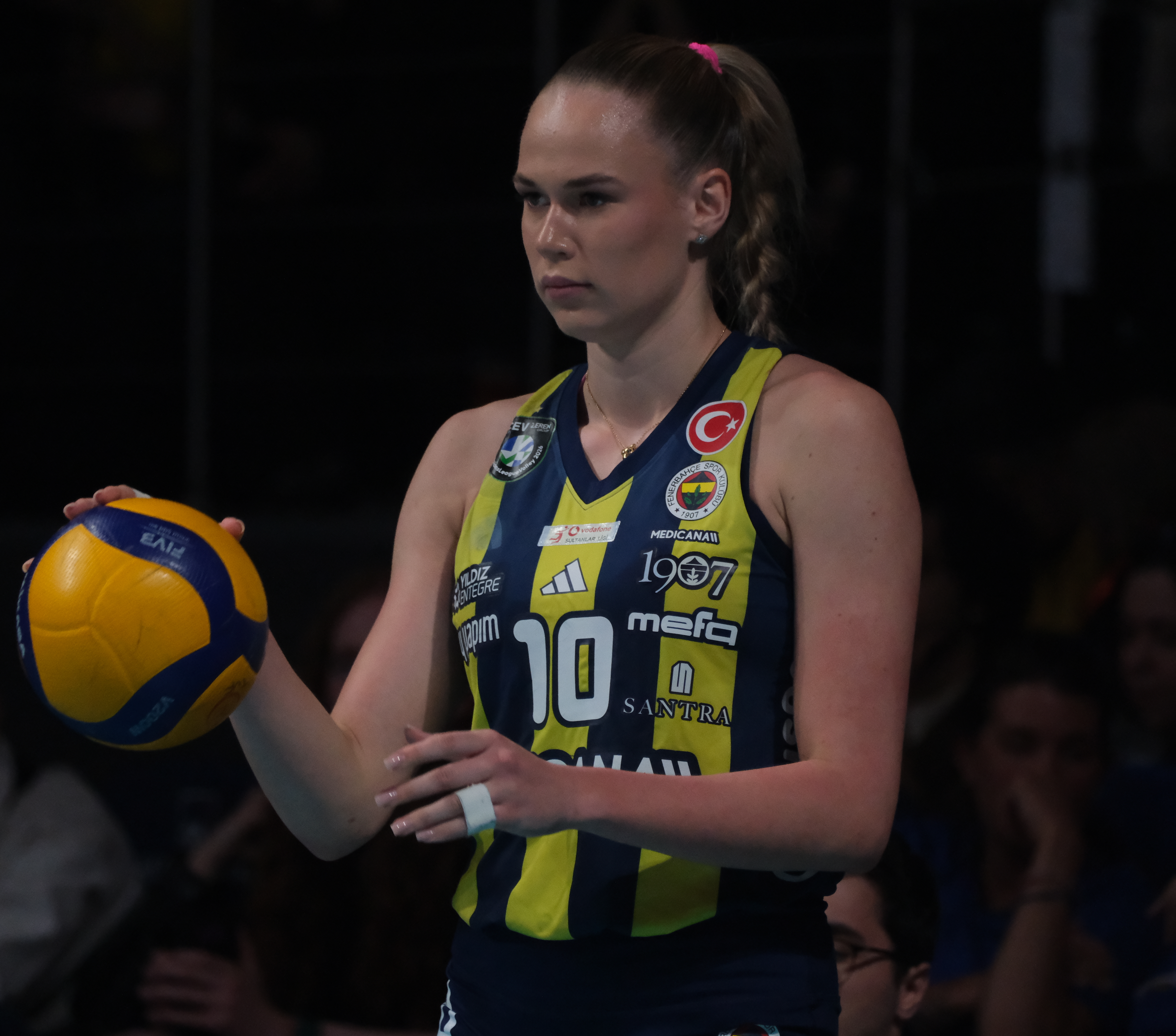
- Arina Fedorovtseva in 2026

Personal information
- Nationality: Russian
- Born: January 19, 2004 (age 22) Moscow, Russia
- Height: 192 cm (6 ft 4 in)
- Weight: 69 kg (152 lb)
- Spike: 325 cm (128 in)
- Block: 310 cm (122 in)

Volleyball information
- Position: Outside hitter
- Current club: Fenerbahçe
- Number: 10 (national team and club)

Career
- Years: Team
- 2019–2021 2021– 2024: (Russia) Dinamo-Kazan (Turkey) Fenerbahçe → (China) Shanghai Bright Ubest

National team
- Years: Team
- 2021–: Russia

Arina Sergeevna Fedorovtseva (Russian: Арина Сергеевна Федоровцева; born 19 January 2004) is a Russian volleyball player who plays as outside hitter for Fenerbahçe and is a member of Russia women's national volleyball team.

== Personal life ==
She is daughter of Olympic Gold medalist rower Sergey Fedorovtsev and Ekaterina Fedorovtseva who is also a rower. Her younger sister Mariia is a gold medalist at the 2021 Rhythmic Gymnastics European Championships in All-Around, 5 Balls and 5 Ribbons sections and gold medalist at 2024 BRICS Games in 5 Hoops section.

== Club career ==
=== Dinamo Kazan (2019–2021) ===
In 2018, Arina Fedorovtseva entered the youth sector of Dinamo-Kazan, where she played for two years, and then she joined the first team, making her Russian Super League debut in the 2019-20 season, in which she won the Russian Super League and the Russian Cup. In the following season 2020-21, she became one of the most important parts of the team and won the Russian Super Cup and another Russian Cup with the club.

=== Fenerbahçe Opet (2021–2024) ===
In 2021–22 season, she transferred to the Turkey Super League and signed with Fenerbahçe. In the 2021-22 summer season, she played in the volleyball team of the Sirius Federal District, which was established by the decision of Russian President Vladimir Putin to develop sports.

=== Shanghai Bright Ubest (2024) ===
On 9 May 2024, she declared that she will play in China Super League for 2024-25 season. In September 2024, signed with Shanghai Bright Ubest, to 31 January 2025, until the end of season. On 30 December 2024, she cancelled her contract with the team and became a free agent.

=== Fenerbahçe Opet (2025– ) ===
On 31 December 2024, she cancelled her contract with Shanghai Bright Ubest and back to Istanbul for sign a new contract with Fenerbahçe. On 13 January 2025, Fenerbahçe announced her return to club.

== National team ==
Arina Fedorovtseva joined the senior Russia National Team in 2021, and her first debut was on 2021 FIVB Nations League. She also participated in Tokyo 2020 Summer Olympics, which the team finished on 7th place.

== Awards ==
=== Club ===
- 2019–20 Russian Super League - Champion, with Dinamo-Kazan
- 2019–20 Russian Cup - Champion, with Dinamo-Kazan
- 2020–21 Russian Super League - 3rd place, with Dinamo-Kazan
- 2020–21 Russian Cup - Champion, with Dinamo-Kazan
- 2020 Russian Super Cup - Champion, with Dinamo-Kazan
- 2021 FIVB Volleyball Women's Club World Championship - 3rd place, with Fenerbahçe Opet
- 2021–22 CEV Champions League - 3rd place, with Fenerbahçe Opet
- 2021–22 Turkish Volleyball League - runner-up, with Fenerbahçe
- 2021–22 Turkish Cup - runner-up, with Fenerbahçe
- 2022-23 CEV Champions League - 3rd place, with Fenerbahçe Opet
- 2022–23 Turkish Volleyball League - Champion, with Fenerbahçe Opet
- 2022–23 Turkish Cup - runner-up, with Fenerbahçe Opet
- 2022 Turkish Super Cup - Champion, with Fenerbahçe Opet
- 2023-24 CEV Champions League - 3rd place, with Fenerbahçe Opet
- 2023–24 Turkish Volleyball League - Champion, with Fenerbahçe Opet
- 2023–24 Turkish Cup - Champion, with Fenerbahçe Opet
- 2023 Turkish Super Cup - runner-up, with Fenerbahçe Opet
- 2024–25 Turkish Cup - Champion, with Fenerbahçe Medicana
- 2025 Turkish Super Cup - Champion, with Fenerbahçe Opet

=== Individual ===
- 2020 Olympics - Best Server
- 2020–21 Russian Super League - Best Server
- 2021 European Championship - Best Server
- 2021 FIVB Volleyball Women's Club World Championship - Best Server
- 2021 FIVB Volleyball Women's Club World Championship - Best Outside Hitter
- 2021–22 CEV Champions League - Best Server
- 2021–22 Turkish Volleyball League - Best Server
- 2022 Turkish Super Cup - Most Valuable Player
- 2022–23 CEV Champions League - Best Server
- 2022–23 Turkish Volleyball League - Best Server
- 2022–23 Turkish Volleyball League - Best Outside Hitter
- 2022–23 Turkish Cup - Best Server
- 2023–24 CEV Champions League - Best Server
- 2023–24 Turkish Volleyball League - Best Server
- 2023–24 Turkish Cup - Best Server

Awards
Preceded by (South Korea) Kim Yeon-koung (United States) Kimberly Hill	Best Outside Spiker of FIVB Club World Championship; 2021 (with (Brazil) Gabriela Guimarães)	Succeeded by (Brazil) Gabriela Guimarães (United States) Kelsey Robinson
