= Fenerbahçe S.K. (women's volleyball) =

Women's volleyball branch of Fenerbahçe sports club

Fenerbahçe
- Full name: Fenerbahçe Spor Kulübü
- Short name: FB; Fener
- Nickname: Sarı Kanaryalar (The Yellow Canaries); Sarı Lacivertliler (The Yellow-Navy Blues); Sarı Melekler (The Yellow Angels)
- Founded: 1928 (initial); 1954 (refounded)
- Ground: Burhan Felek Sport Hall (Capacity: 7.000)
- Chairman: (Turkey) Aziz Yıldırım
- Manager: (Italy) Stefano Lavarini
- Captain: (Turkey) Eda Erdem Dündar
- League: Sultanlar Ligi; CEV Champions League
- 2025–26: 2nd
- Website: Club home page
- Championships: 1 World Championship; 1 European Championship; 1 CEV Cup; 15 Turkish Championships (8 pre-1984); 5 Turkish Cups; 6 Turkish Super Cups

Uniforms
Home	Away

Fenerbahçe Women's Volleyball, commonly known as Fenerbahçe and officially known as Fenerbahçe Medicana for commercial reasons, are the professional women's volleyball department of Fenerbahçe SK, a major Turkish multi-sport club based in Istanbul, Turkey. They play their matches at the 7.000-seated Burhan Felek Sport Hall. Fenerbahçe compete in the Turkish Women's Volleyball League, which is considered to be one of the best and most competitive leagues in the world.

Founded in 1928, Fenerbahçe are one of the best volleyball teams in Turkey and in the world. They were crowned World Champions by winning the FIVB Volleyball Women's Club World Championship undefeated in 2010, thus achieving the first intercontinental quadruple ever in Turkish volleyball history, after having won the Turkish League, Turkish Cup, and the Turkish Super Cup in 2010. Fenerbahçe became the first Turkish team to claim a World Championship title. After being runners-up in the CEV Champions League in 2010, Fenerbahçe finally were crowned European Champions in the 2011–12 season after defeating French powerhouse RC Cannes in three straight sets (25–14, 25–22, and 25–20) in the final game. The club also reached the third place of the Champions League twice, in the 2010–11 and 2015–16 seasons.

Fenerbahçe won the 2014 CEV Cup by defeating Uralochka-NTMK Ekaterinburg. On the same day, the men's team won the CEV Challenge Cup, making Fenerbahçe the first sports club in Turkey to win European titles in both men's and women's volleyball departments.

In Turkey the club have won 15 Turkish Championship titles (7 in the current Turkish Women's Volleyball League and 8 in the former Turkish Women's Volleyball Championship), 5 Turkish Cups, and 6 Turkish Super Cups, among others.

== Previous names ==
- Fenerbahçe (1928, 1954–2007)
- Fenerbahçe Acıbadem (2007–2011)
- Fenerbahçe Universal (2011–2012)
- Fenerbahçe (2012–2014)
- Fenerbahçe Grundig (2014–2016)
- Fenerbahçe (2016–2018)
- Fenerbahçe Opet (2018–2024)
- Fenerbahçe Medicana (2024–present)

== History ==
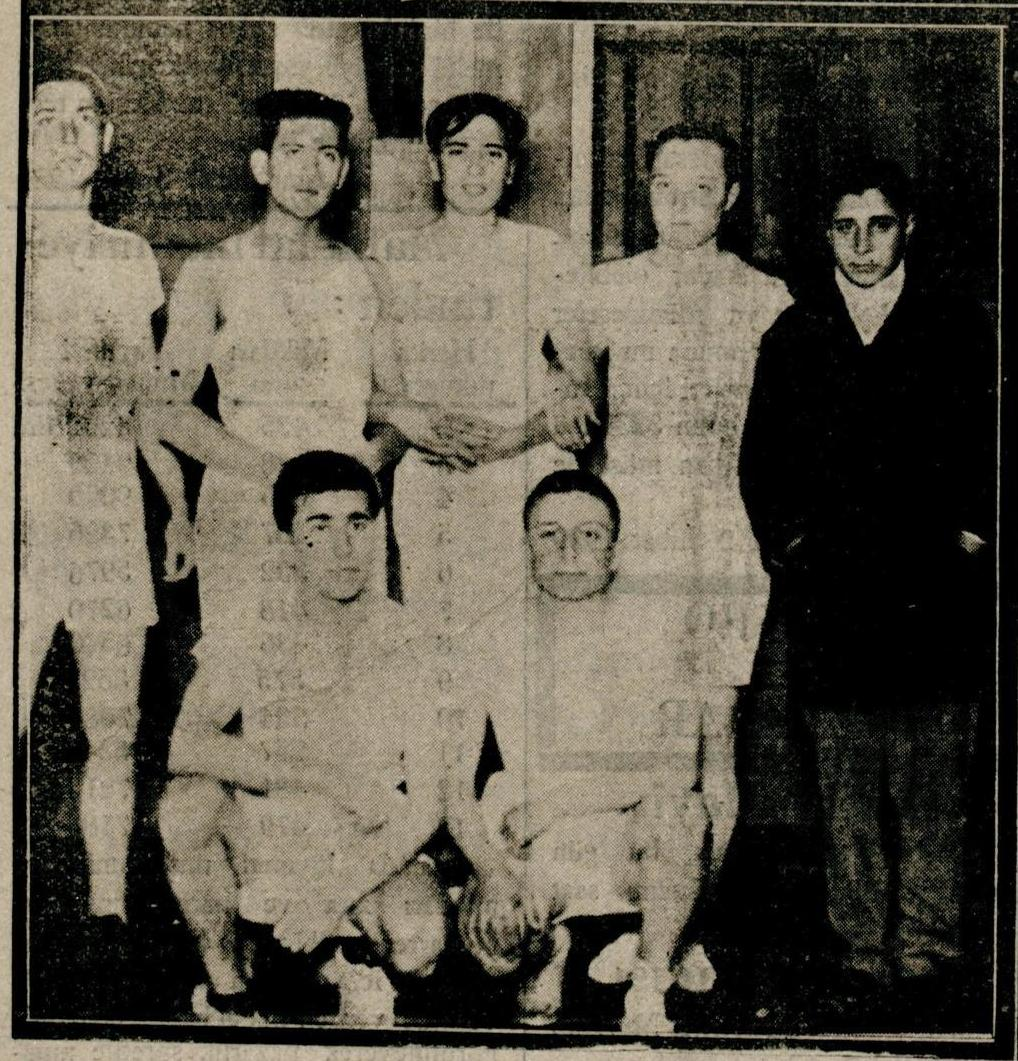
Sabiha Rıfat Gürayman with her male teammates from Fenerbahçe's volleyball team in 1929.

The women's volleyball department was founded in 1928 by Sabiha Gürayman who, as a young woman, played for the club's men's volleyball team, and was the first woman architect in Turkey. However, the section was closed due to lack of opponents. In 1954, a new era started with assistance from Çamlıca Girls' High School (tr). Starting in 1958, the girls won eight Turkish Championships among many other titles. In 1977, the department was closed again until 1989, this time due to insufficient funds. In 1993, the team was promoted from the Istanbul First League to the Turkish Second League. The following year, they played in the Turkish First League. However, they were relegated to the Turkish Second League in the 1995–96 season.

Fenerbahçe returned to the Turkish First League in the 2002–03 season, and were runners-up in the 2006–07 season. The senior team was renamed as Fenerbahçe Acıbadem due to a sponsorship agreement with the Acıbadem Healthcare Group from 2007 to 2011. The Yellow Angels were runners-up after Eczacıbaşı SK in the 2007–08 season, too. They gained the ninth Turkish title in their history in the 2008–09 season, after defeating their archrivals Eczacıbaşı SK in the finals (3–2, 0–3, 3–1, 3–1), which was their first ever title in the league's current format that had started with the 1984–85 season.

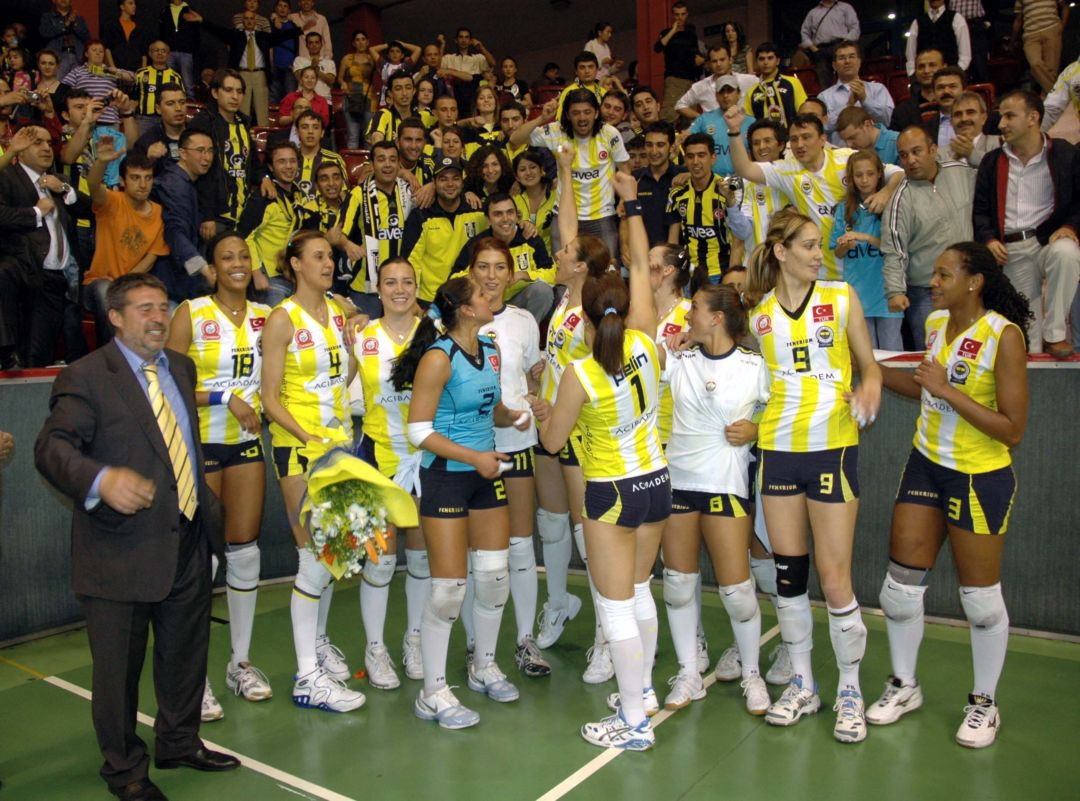
In 2008, the team under the management of Adnan Kıstak earned the nickname 'Yellow Angels'.

Fenerbahçe's women's team shone in the 2009–10 season as the Yellow Angels finished the first round of the 2009–10 Turkish League undefeated in 22 matches (setting a 66:2 set ratio record), and reached the Final Four of the 2009–10 CEV Women's Champions League undefeated. The team then beat the host team RC Cannes in a thrilling five-setter, but eventually lost to Volley Bergamo in five sets in the final, even though they came back after falling two sets down: 22–25, 21–25, 25–22, 25–20, 9–15. Yekaterina Gamova was named the best scorer and Nataša Osmokrović was chosen the best server of the tournament.

On 21 December 2010 in Doha, Qatar, the team of Fenerbahçe beat South American titleholders Sollys Osasco 3–0 (25–23, 25–22, 25–17) to become the first team in 16 years to claim the 2010 FIVB Women's Club World Championship where Katarzyna Skowrońska was named the MVP and Best Scorer, while Eda Erdem Dündar was the Best Server.

In 2011, Fenerbahçe SK organized the Champions League Final Four in the Burhan Felek Sports Hall in Istanbul, however, in the semi-final the Yellow Angels lost to Turkish rivals Vakıfbank in a five setter (25–19, 21–25, 25–21, 19–25, 11–15), and lost the chance to be the very first team in Turkish volleyball history to win the Champions League title. The Yellow Angels settled for the third place after beating Scavolini Pesaro in four sets (14–25, 25–21, 25–21, 25–21), thanks to the national heroines Seda Tokatlıoğlu, Naz Aydemir and Eda Erdem Dündar.

In 2012 the club won the CEV Volleyball Champions League, which was organized in Baku on 24–25 March 2012, having defeated French powerhouse RC Cannes in the final in three straight sets (25–14, 25–22, and 25–20). Kim won the MVP award and the Best Scorer award, while Naz Aydemir was named the Best Setter.

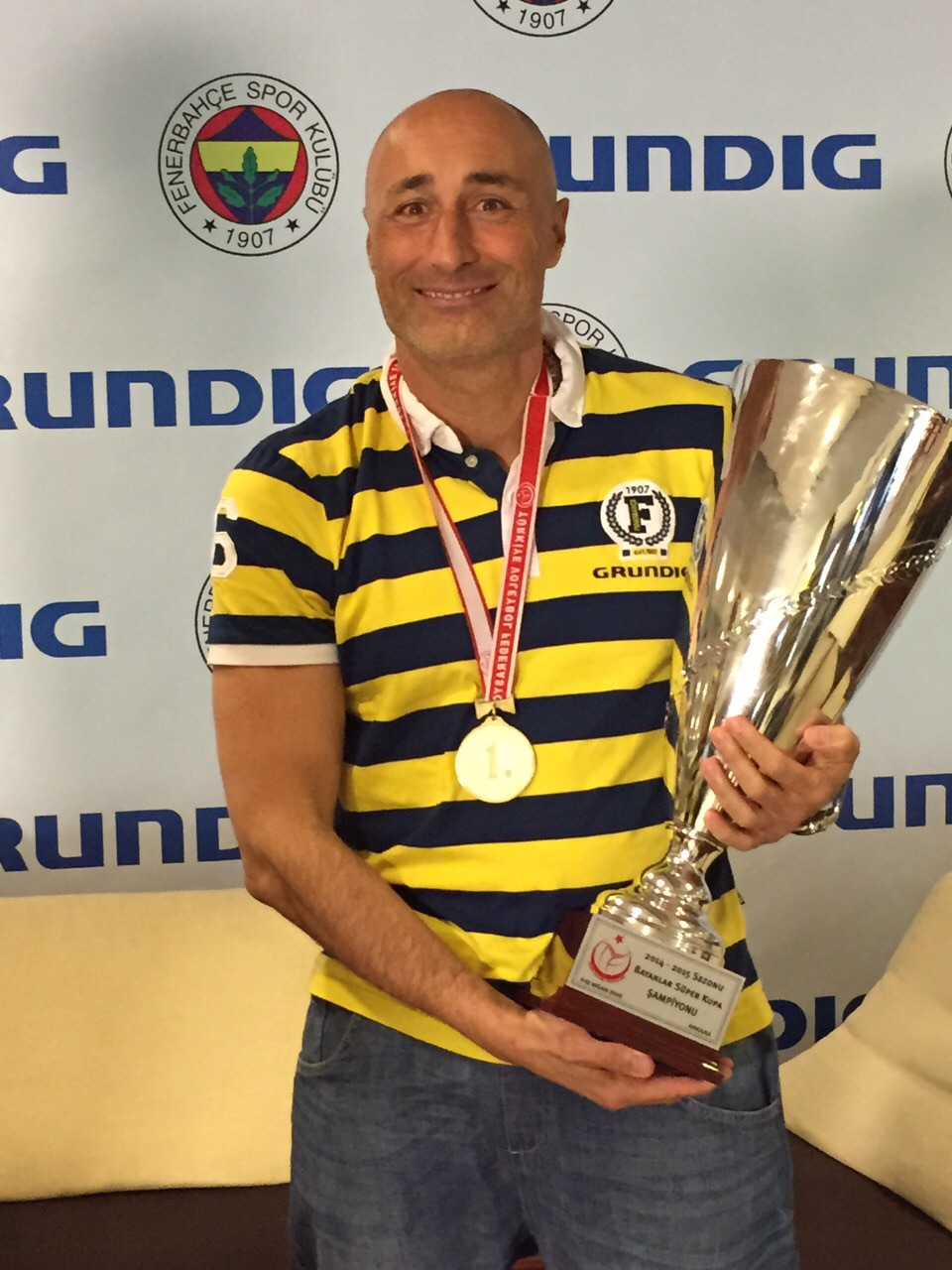
Marcello Abbondanza at the 2015 Turkish Cup Finals

Fenerbahçe, which had an ambitious squad again as a result of the restructuring, managed to become the champion of the CEV Cup (which they lost in the finals a year ago) this time (Fenerbahçe women's volleyball team became the champion by defeating the Russian Uraloçka team on March 29, 2014, while Fenerbahçe men's volleyball team also became the champion by defeating the Italian Andreoli Latina team 3-0 in the CEV Challenge Cup on the same day, and the Yellow-Navy Blues became the first team to win two European Cups on the same day). The Yellow-Navy Blues reached the finals of the Turkish Women's Volleyball League in the same season, and despite reaching the finals of the Turkish Cup, they remained in second place. However, the Yellow Angels continued their rise in the 2014-15 season and left behind Vakıfbank, Eczacıbaşı and Galatasaray Daikin in the final group held in Ankara and İzmir between 22 April and 1 May 2015 and reached the 12th Turkish championship in their history. The team also became the champion of the Turkish Cup in the same season (for the second time in their history), and closed the season with a double cup. The yellow-dark blue team was eliminated in the play-off round of the Champions League by Vakıfbank. The Yellow Angels entered the 2015-16 season by defeating Vakıfbank and winning the Champions Cup championship (for the third time in its history), while in the Turkish League, despite finishing the regular season as the leader, they lost to the same team twice in the final group and finished the league in second place. In the CEV Women's Champions League, they came third in Europe. The 2016-17 season was another golden season for Fenerbahçe. Having won the double championship in Turkish League and Turkish Cup, the Yellow Angels especially eliminated Eczacıbaşı in the semi-finals of the League, and came from behind 14-9 to win the golden set of the match on April 12, 2017 that determined the finalist, and surprisingly faced Galatasaray Daikin, who eliminated Vakıfbank in the finals. The Yellow-dark blue team won all three matches comfortably, reaching their 13th Turkish championship, while the Yellow-red team's championship longing since 1966 continued. The photo of the two teams' players arm in arm at the cup ceremony went down in history as one of the unforgettable moments in the eternal rivalry.

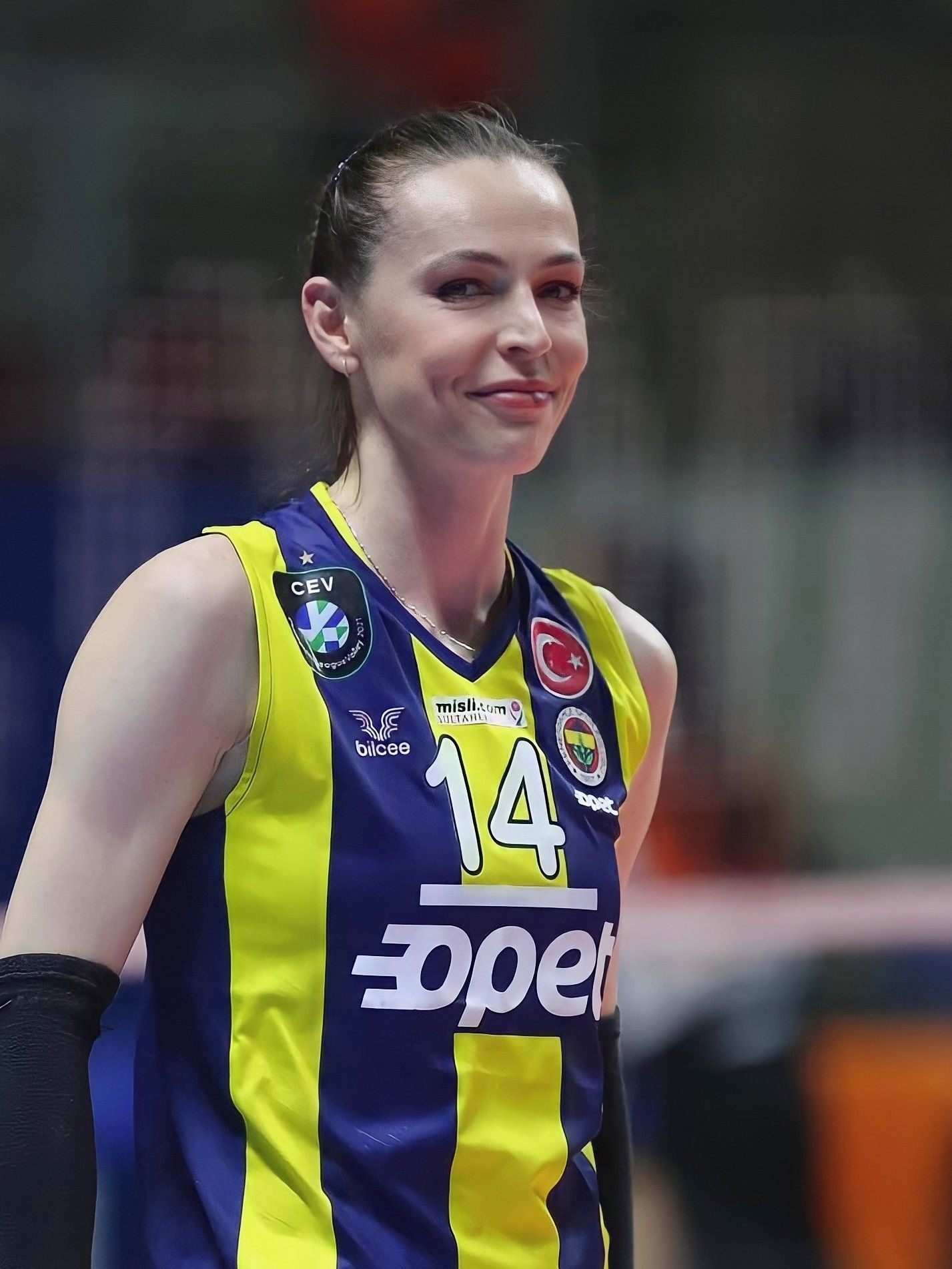
Eda Erdem, the current captain.

After this championship, the Yellow Angels maintained their claims in both the Turkish and European Cups, but they entered a five-year championship longing. The Yellow-Navy Blues finished third in the 2017-18 and 2018-19 seasons in the Turkish League and second in the 2020-21 and 2021-22 seasons (the 2019-20 season could not be completed due to the COVID-19 pandemic), played in the finals of the Turkish Cup in the 2018-19, 2021-22 and 2022-23 seasons. In the CEV Women's Champions League, they were semi-finalists in the 2018-19 and 2020-21 seasons, and came third in the 2021-22 season.

Starting from the 2022-23 season, Fenerbahçe started to embrace the championships it missed again. Having started the aforementioned season by beating Vakıfbank 3-0 and becoming the Champions Cup champion for the fourth time in its history, The Yellow Canaries defeated the same team in the golden set in the Turkish League semifinals and Eczacıbaşı in all three matches in the final, reaching their 14th Turkish championship in their history. In the 2023-24 season, the Yellow Angels increased their level of success and won double championships in the Turkish League and Turkish Cup. However, that year they were eliminated in the semifinals in Europe.

In this way, the Yellow-Navy Blues, who reached their 15th Turkish championship, made a great contribution to the Turkish women's national volleyball team, which rose to the top of the world with the success they achieved. In this context, Eda Erdem (captain), Melissa Vargas (top scorer) and Aslı Kalaç played in the national team that won the Nations League, European Championship and World Cup championships in 2023.

== Partnership with Polisportiva Consolini ==
A three-year agreement covering the 2025–26, 2026–27 and 2027–28 seasons has been reached with Italian Serie A1 club Polisportiva Consolini on a project to enhance financial support and technical cooperation. Under this agreement, both clubs will conduct scouting activities worldwide to identify young talent and provide them with experience in Romagna before stepping onto the highest level.

== Honours ==
=== Worldwide and European competitions ===
Fenerbahçe S.K.
Medal record

Women's volleyball

Representing Fenerbahçe

FIVB Volleyball Women's Club World Championship
Gold medal – first place	FIVB Club World Championship	2010
Bronze medal – third place	FIVB Club World Championship	2012
Bronze medal – third place	FIVB Club World Championship	2021

CEV Women's Champions League
Gold medal – first place	CEV Champions League	2011–12
Silver medal – second place	CEV Champions League	2009–10
Bronze medal – third place	CEV Champions League	2010–11
Bronze medal – third place	CEV Champions League	2015–16
Bronze medal – third place	CEV Champions League	2018–19
Bronze medal – third place	CEV Champions League	2021–22
Bronze medal – third place	CEV Champions League	2022–23
Bronze medal – third place	CEV Champions League	2023–24

Women's CEV Cup
Gold medal – first place	CEV Cup	2013–14
Silver medal – second place	CEV Cup	2012–13
Bronze medal – third place	CEV Cup	2008–09

=== Worldwide competitions ===
- FIVB Volleyball Women's Club World Championship
  - Winners (1): 2010
  - Third place (2): 2012, 2021

=== European competitions ===
- CEV Champions League
  - Winners (1): 2011–12
  - Runners-up (1): 2009–10
  - Third place (6): 2010–11, 2015–16, 2018–19, 2021–22, 2022–23, 2023–24
- CEV Cup
  - Winners (1): 2013–14
  - Runners-up (1): 2012–13
  - Third place (1): 2008–09

=== Domestic competitions ===
- Turkish Women's Volleyball League
  - Winners (7): 2008–09, 2009–10, 2010–11, 2014–15, 2016–17, 2022–23, 2023–24
  - Runners-up (8): 2006–07, 2007–08, 2013–14, 2015–16, 2020–21, 2021–22, 2024–25, 2025–26
  - Third place (4): 2011–12, 2012–13, 2017–18, 2018–19
- Turkish Women's Volleyball Championship
  - Winners (8): 1955–56, 1956–57, 1957–58, 1958–59, 1959–60, 1967–68, 1968–69, 1971–72
  - Runners-up (3): 1960–61, 1972–73, 1974–75
  - Third place (3): 1961–62, 1973–74, 1976–77
- Turkish Cup
  - Winners (5): 2009–10, 2014–15, 2016–17, 2023–24, 2024–25
  - Runners-up (5): 2008–09, 2013–14, 2018–19, 2021–22, 2022–23
- Turkish Super Cup
  - Winners (6): (record) 2009, 2010, 2015, 2022, 2024, 2025
  - Runners-up (4): 2011, 2014, 2017, 2023
- Turkish Federation Cup
  - Winners (2): 1959–60, 1976–77
  - Runners-up (1): 1965–66
- Istanbul Women's Volleyball League
  - Winners (11): 1954–55, 1955–56, 1956–57, 1957–58, 1958–59, 1960–61, 1967–68, 1968–69, 1970–71, 1971–72, 1972–73
  - Runners-up (5): 1959–60, 1962–63, 1969–70, 1973–74, 1974–75
  - Third place (6): 1961–62, 1963–64, 1964–65, 1965–66, 1966–67, 1976–77

== Roster ==
Players as of October 9, 2026

No.	Player	Position	Date of Birth	Height (m)	Country
1	Gizem Örge	Libero	26 April 1993 (age 33)	1.70	Turkey
5	Brenda Castillo	Libero	5 June 1992 (age 34)	1.67	Dominican Republic
6	Kübra Akman	Middle blocker	13 October 1994 (age 31)	2.00	Turkey
7	Hande Baladın	Outside hitter	1 September 1997 (age 29)	1.90	Turkey
8	Alessia Orro	Setter	18 July 1998 (age 28)	1.78	Italy
10	Arina Fedorovtseva	Outside hitter	19 January 2004 (age 22)	1.90	Russia
11	Chiaka Ogbogu	Middle blocker	15 April 1995 (age 31)	1.85	United States
12	Ana Cristina de Souza	Outside hitter	7 April 2004 (age 22)	1.93	Brazil
14	Eda Erdem Dündar (c)	Middle blocker	22 June 1987 (age 39)	1.88	Turkey
15	Arelya Karasoy Koçaş	Setter	14 December 1996 (age 29)	1.82	Turkey
16	Saliha Şahin	Outside hitter	5 November 1998 (age 27)	1.86	Turkey
23	Melis Özengin	Opposite hitters	2 July 2009 (age 17)	1.90	Turkey
44	Melissa Vargas	Opposite	16 October 1999 (age 26)	1.93	Turkey
88	Sinead Jack	Middle blocker	8 November 1993 (age 32)	1.96	Turkey

== Technical and managerial staff ==
Staff as of January 12, 2026

Name	Position
(Turkey) Mustafa Aydın Acun	Board member
(Turkey) Pelin Çelik	Team manager
(Italy) Stefano Lavarini	Head coach
(Italy) Andrea Mafrici	Assistant coach
(Turkey) Recep Vatansever	Assistant coach
(Poland) Krystian Pachlinski	Assistant coach
(Turkey) Uğur Sarıer	Physiotherapist

== Season by season ==
Season	League	Pos.	Turkish Cup	Turkish Super Cup	European competitions		Worldwide competitions	
2007–08	TWVL	2nd	Not held	Not held	CEV Champions League	RS		
2008–09	TWVL	1st	Runners-up	Not held	CEV Cup	3rd		
2009–10	TWVL	1st	Champions	Champions	CEV Champions League	RU		
2010–11	TWVL	1st		Champions	CEV Champions League	3rd	FIVB Women's CWC	C
2011–12	TWVL	3rd		Runners-up	CEV Champions League	C		
2012–13	TWVL	3rd			CEV Cup	RU	FIVB Women's CWC	3rd
2013–14	TWVL	2nd	Runners-up		CEV Cup	C		
2014–15	TWVL	1st	Champions	Runners-up	CEV Champions League	QF		
2015–16	TWVL	2nd	Not held	Champions	CEV Champions League	3rd		
2016–17	TWVL	1st	Champions	Not held	CEV Champions League	QF		
2017–18	TWVL	3rd	Semi finals	Runners-up	CEV Champions League	RS		
2018–19	TWVL	3rd	Runners-up		CEV Champions League	3rd		
2019–20	TWVL	Covid 19	Not held		CEV Champions League			
2020–21	TWVL	2nd	Semi finals		CEV Champions League	QF		
2021–22	TWVL	2nd	Runners-up		CEV Champions League	3rd	FIVB Women's CWC	3rd
2022–23	TWVL	1st	Runners-up	Champions	CEV Champions League	3rd		
2023–24	TWVL	1st	Champions	Runners-up	CEV Champions League	3rd		
2024–25	TWVL	2nd	Champions	Champions	CEV Champions League	QF		
2025–26	TWVL	2nd	Semi finals	Champions	CEV Champions League	QF		

== Home halls ==
This is a list of the home halls the senior team played at in the recent years.

#	Hall	Period
1	Burhan Felek Sport Hall	2004–2007
2	Caferağa Sport Hall – Haldun Alagaş Sports Hall^{1}	2007–2008
3	50th Anniversary Sport Hall	2008–2010
4	Burhan Felek Sports Hall	2010–
5	Ülker Sports Arena	2015–

^{1} CEV Champions League games only.

== Notable players ==
Criteria

To appear in this section a player must have either:

- Played at least one season for the club.
- Set a club record or won an individual award while at the club.
- Played at least one official international match for their national team at any time.
- To perform very successfully during period in the club or at later/previous stages of his career.

Domestic Players

Turkey

- Arelya Karasoy Koçaş
- Aslı Kalaç
- Aysun Özbek
- Bahar Toksoy
- Buse Ünal
- Cansu Çetin
- Ceren Kestirengöz
- Çiğdem Can
- Damla Çakıroğlu
- Derya Çayırgan
- Dicle Nur Babat
- Duygu Bal
- Eda Erdem
- Elif Ağca
- Ergül Avcı
- Ezgi Dilik
- Fatma Yıldırım
- Gizem Güreşen
- Gizem Örge
- Gökçen Denkel
- Hande Baladın
- Helin Kayıkçı
- İpar Özay Kurt
- İpek Soroğlu
- Melis Yılmaz
- Merve Dalbeler
- Meryem Boz
- Naz Aydemir
- Nihan Güneyligil
- Nilay Karaağaç
- Nilay Özdemir
- Özge Kırdar
- Özlem Güven
- Özlem Özçelik
- Pelin Çelik
- Polen Uslupehlivan
- Sabiha Rıfat
- Seda Tokatlıoğlu
- Seda Eryüz
- Songül Dikmen
- Şeyma Ercan
- Yağmur Koçyiğit
- Meliha İsmailoğlu Diken (Bosnia and Herzegovina)
- Melissa Vargas (Cuba)
- Liza Safronova (Kazakhstan) (Ukraine)

European Players

Azerbaijan

- Oksana Parkhomenko (Ukraine)
- Valeriya Korotenko (Ukraine)
- Polina Rahimova (Uzbekistan)

Belarus

- Marina Tumas

Belgium

- Frauke Dirickx

Bulgaria

- Dobriana Rabadžieva
- Elitsa Vasileva
- Hristina Ruseva

Croatia

- Mia Jerkov
- Nataša Osmokrović

Czech Republic

- Aneta Havlíčková

France

- Christina Bauer (Norway)

Germany

- Christiane Fürst

Italy

- Alessia Orro
- Eleonora Lo Bianco
- Lucia Bosetti

Netherlands

- Alice Blom
- Maret Balkestein-Grothues

Poland

- Agnieszka Korneluk
- Berenika Okuniewska
- Katarzyna Skorupa
- Katarzyna Skowrońska
- Magdalena Stysiak

Russia

- Anna Lazareva
- Arina Fedorovtseva
- Irina Fetisova
- Lioubov Sokolova
- Yekaterina Gamova

Serbia

- Anja Spasojević
- Bianka Buša
- Bojana Drča
- Bojana Milenković
- Brankica Mihajlović
- Mina Popović

Non-European Players

Brazil

- Ana Beatriz Chagas
- Ana Cristina de Souza
- Fabiana Claudino
- Fernanda Garay
- Fofão Souza
- Macris Carneiro
- Marianne Steinbrecher
- Natália Pereira
- Paula Pequeno
- Tatiana Santos

Colombia

- Madelaynne Montaño

Mexico

- Samantha Bricio

South Korea

- Kim Yeon-koung

Thailand

- Nootsara Tomkom

United States

- Alisha Glass
- Christa Harmotto
- Jordan Thompson
- Kelsey Robinson
- Kim Glass
- Kristin Hildebrand
- Lindsey Berg
- Logan Tom
- Nicole Davis
- Therese Crawford
- Yaasmeen Bedart-Ghani

Players written in italic still play for the club.

== Team captains ==
This is a list of the senior team's captains in the recent years.

Period	Captain
1927-1928	(Turkey) Sabiha Rıfat
1954-1960	(Turkey) Ayten Berkalp
1960-?	(Turkey) Ayşe Çapa
?-1973	(Turkey) Perihan Özbilgin
1973-1977	(Turkey) Sema Esinduy
2005-2006	(Turkey) Seda Tokatlıoğlu
2006-2008	(Turkey) Özlem Özçelik
2008-2011	(Turkey) Çiğdem Can Rasna
2011-2014	(Turkey) Seda Tokatlıoğlu
2014-present	(Turkey) Eda Erdem

== Head coaches ==
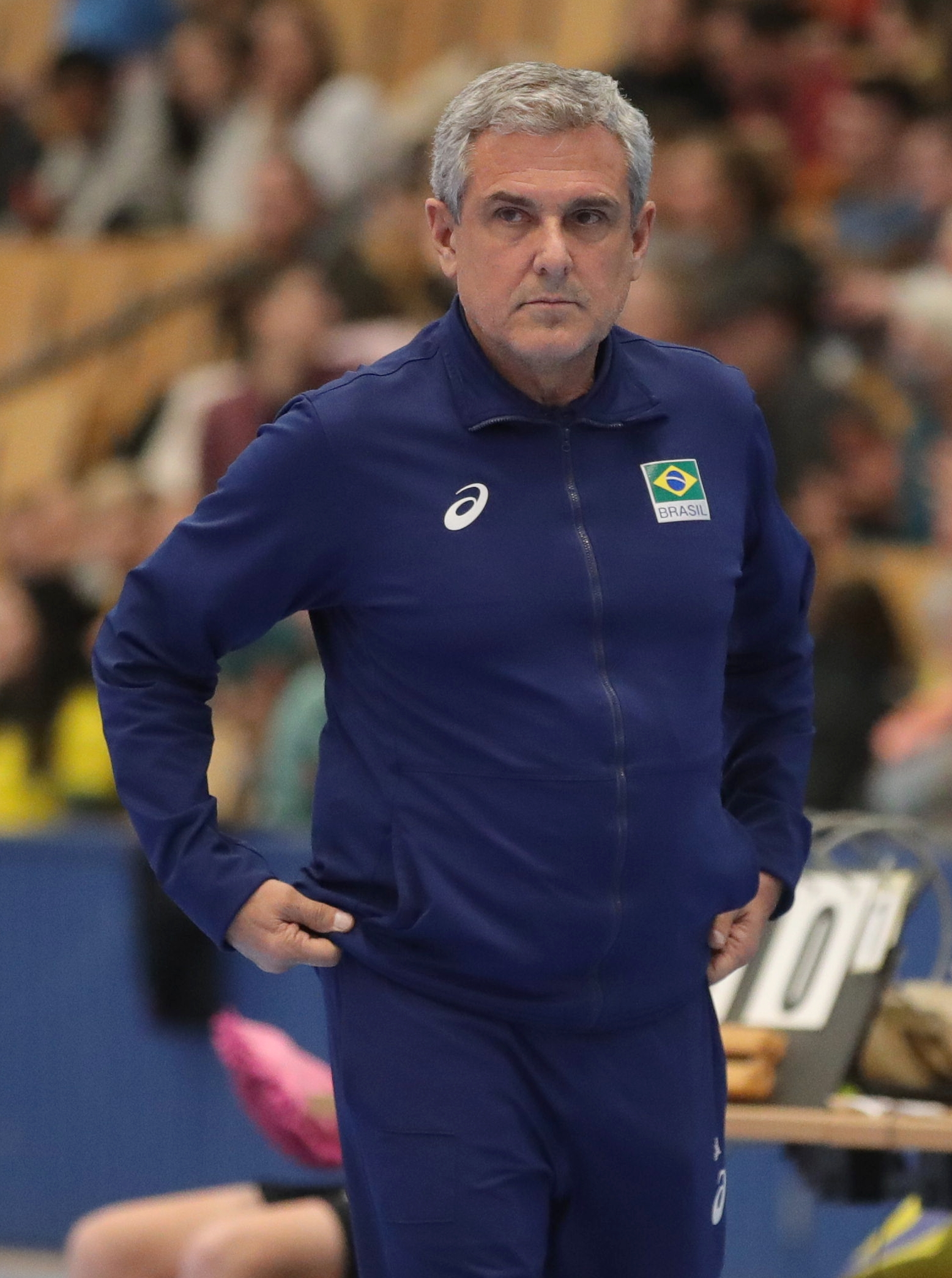
Zé Roberto

This is a list of the senior team's head coaches in the recent years.

Period	Head coach
1954-1963	(Turkey) Alaaddin Güneş
1970-1975	(Turkey) Deniz Esinduy
1982-1984	(Turkey) Alaaddin Güneş
1987-2003	(Turkey) Abdullah Paşaoğlu
2003-2005	(Cuba) Jesús Savigne
2005-2008	(Turkey) Adnan Kıstak
2008-2009	(Turkey) Üzeyir Özdurak
2009-2010	(Belgium) Jan de Brandt
2010-2012	(Brazil) Zé Roberto
2012-2013	(Turkey) Kamil Söz
2013-2017	(Italy) Marcello Abbondanza
2017-2018	(Belgium) Jan de Brandt
2018	(Turkey) Salih Erdoğan Tavacı
2018-2023	(Serbia) Zoran Terzić
2023-2024	(Italy) Stefano Lavarini
2024-2025	(Italy) Marco Fenoglio
2025-present	(Italy) Marcello Abbondanza

== Sponsorship and kit manufacturers ==
Period	Kit sponsors
2005–2006	Century 21^{1} – Merit Life ^{2} – Adahan Logistics^{4}
2006–2007	Acıbadem^{1} ^{2} ^{4}
2007–2011	Acıbadem^{1} ^{2} ^{3} ^{4}
2011–2012	Universal^{1} ^{3} ^{4} – Bonus^{2}
2012–2013	none
2013	Fenercell^{1} – Bonus^{2}
2013	Grundig^{1} ^{3} – Bonus^{2}
2013–2016	Grundig^{1} – Bonus^{2} – Fenercell^{3}
2016	Grundig^{1} – Bonus^{2} –Barilla^{2} – Fenercell^{3}
2016–2017	Bonus^{2} – Barilla^{2} – Fenercell^{3}
2017–2018	none
2018–2019	Opet^{1}
2019–2020	Opet^{1} – Corendon Airlines^{2} – Kafkas Jewellery^{3} – Fluo^{4}
2020–2021	Opet^{1} – Corendon Airlines^{2}
2021–2022	Opet^{1} – Corendon Airlines^{2} – Asperox^{3} – Gossef
2022–2023	Opet^{1} – 1907 Fenerbahçe Derneği^{2} – Sanmar^{2} – Tirebolu 42 Çay^{4}

^{1} Main sponsorship ^{2} Back sponsorship ^{3} Lateral sponsorship ^{4} Short sponsorship

Period	Kit manufacturers
2000–2018	Fenerium
2018–2022	Bilcee
2022–	Joma

== See also ==
- Fenerbahçe SK
- Fenerbahçe Men's Volleyball
