= Seda Tokatlıoğlu =

Turkish volleyball player

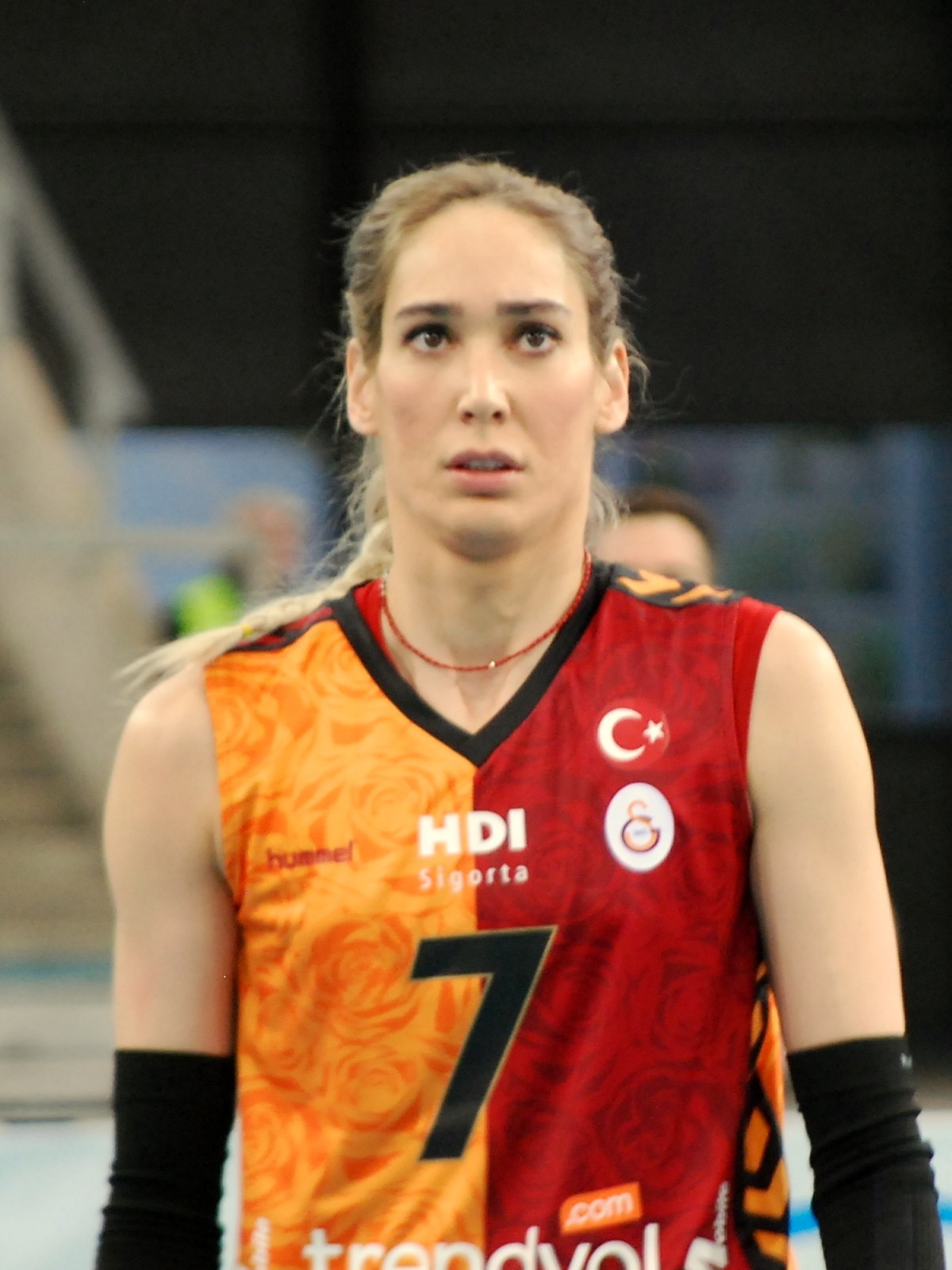
- Tokatlıoğlu in 2017

Personal information
- Full name: Seda Aslanyürek Tokatlıoğlu
- Born: 25 June 1986 (age 40); Ankara, Turkey
- Height: 1.92 m (6 ft 4 in)
- Weight: 70 kg (154 lb)
- Spike: 312 cm (123 in)
- Block: 304 cm (120 in)

Volleyball information
- Position: Outside Spiker
- Current club: (Turkey) Galatasaray
- Number: 9

National team
2003-present	Turkey
Medal record
Women's volleyball
Representing Turkey
European Championships
Silver medal – second place	2003 Ankara	Team
European League
Silver medal – second place	2009 Kayseri	Team
Mediterranean Games
Gold medal – first place	2005 Almeria	Team
Silver medal – second place	2009 Pescara	Team
Silver medal – second place	2013 Mersin	Team

Seda Aslanyürek Tokatlıoğlu (born 25 June 1986) is a Turkish volleyball player. She is 192 cm tall and plays as an outside spiker. However, she played as an opposite both in Turkey women's national volleyball team and Beijing from China. Tokatlıoğlu has a block height of 304 cm and spike height of 312 cm and played more than 200 times for the national team. She studied at Gazi University.

== Career ==
Tokatlıoğlu was born in Ankara. She has been playing for Fenerbahçe since 2005 with jersey number 9. She is also the team's captain. Before signing for Fenerbahçe, she played for İller Bankası from 2002 to 2005.

With Fenerbahçe, she won the silver medal at 2009-10 CEV Champions League and the bronze medal at the 2008–09 CEV Cup and was awarded "Best Scorer".

Seda won the bronze medal at the 2010–11 CEV Champions League with Fenerbahçe.

Tokatlıoğlu played with Fenerbahçe in the 2012 FIVB Club World Championship held in Doha, Qatar and helped her team to win the bronze medal after defeating Puerto Rico's Lancheras de Cataño 3–0.

On 27 July 2014 she signed with Beijing from China.

== Teams Played ==
- (Turkey) İller Bankası (2002-2005)
- (Turkey) Fenerbahçe (2005-2014)
- (China) Beijing (2014-2015)
- (Turkey) Galatasaray (2016-2018)

== Awards ==
=== Individuals ===
- 2008 World Grand Prix "Best Scorer"
- 2008-09 Aroma Women's Volleyball League play-offs "Most Valuable Player"
- 2008–09 CEV Cup "Best Scorer"

=== National team ===
- 2003 European Championship - Silver Medal
- 2005 Mediterranean Games - Gold Medal
- 2009 Mediterranean Games - Silver Medal
- 2009 European League - Silver Medal
- 2013 Mediterranean Games - Silver

=== Clubs ===
- 2007-08 Aroma Women's Volleyball League - Runner-Up, with Fenerbahçe Acıbadem
- 2008-09 Women's CEV Top Teams Cup - 3rd place and best scorer with Fenerbahçe Acıbadem
- 2008-09 Aroma Women's Volleyball League - Champion, with Fenerbahçe Acıbadem
- 2008-09 Turkish Cup - Runner-Up, with Fenerbahçe Acıbadem
- 2009 Turkish Super Cup - Champion, with Fenerbahçe Acıbadem
- 2009-10 Aroma Women's Volleyball League - Champion, with Fenerbahçe Acıbadem
- 2009-10 Turkish Cup - Champion, with Fenerbahçe Acıbadem
- 2010 Turkish Super Cup - Champion, with Fenerbahçe Acıbadem
- 2009-10 CEV Champions League - Runner-Up, with Fenerbahçe Acıbadem
- 2010 FIVB World Club Championship - Champion, with Fenerbahçe Acıbadem
- 2010-11 CEV Champions League - Bronze medal, with Fenerbahçe Acıbadem
- 2010-11 Aroma Women's Volleyball League - Champion, with Fenerbahçe Acıbadem
- 2011-12 CEV Champions League - Champion, with Fenerbahçe Universal
- 2012 FIVB Women's Club World Championship – Bronze Medal, with Fenerbahçe
- 2012-13 CEV Cup - Runner-Up, with Fenerbahçe
- 2013-14 CEV Cup - Champion, with Fenerbahçe

== See also ==
- Turkish women in sports
