= 2011–12 CEV Women's Champions League =

- League: CEV Women's Champions League
- Sport: Volleyball

Finals
- Champions: (Turkey) Fenerbahçe
- Runners-up: (France) RC Cannes
- Finals MVP: (South Korea) Kim Yeon-Koung

CEV Women's Champions League seasons
- ← 2010–11 2012–13 →

The CEV Champions League was the highest level of European club volleyball in the 2011–12 season and the 53rd edition. It ran from 29 November 2011 until 26 March 2012.

Fenerbahçe won the title for the first time, defeating RC Cannes 3–0 in the final.

== Teams of the 2011–2012 competition ==
The number of participants on the basis of ranking list for European Cup Competitions:

Rank	Country	Number of teams	Teams
1	Italy	3	Volley Bergamo; MC-Carnaghi Villa Cortese; Scavolini Pesaro
3	Turkey	3	Fenerbahçe Universal Istanbul; VakıfBank TT İstanbul; Eczacıbaşı VitrA Istanbul (w/c)
2	Russia	2	Dinamo Kazan; Dinamo Moscow
4	France	2	RC Cannes; ASPTT Mulhouse
5	Poland	2	Atom Trefl Sopot; Bank BPS Fakro Muszyna
11	Germany	2	Schweriner SC; Dresdner SC
15	Azerbaijan	2	Rabita Baku; Azerrail Baku (w/c)
7	Serbia	1	Crvena Zvezda Beograd
8	Romania	1	2004 Tomis Constanța
13	Switzerland	1	Voléro Zürich
19	Czech Republic	1	VK Modřanská Prostějov

- The drawing of lots for the main phase (group stage) of the competition was held on 1 July 2011, in Vienna.

== League round ==
- 20 teams were drawn to 5 pools of 4 teams each.
- The sixteen best teams qualified for the Round of 16.
- The four other teams moved to the CEV Cup.

=== Pool A ===
Pos	Team	Pld	W	L	Pts	SPW	SPL	SPR	SW	SL	SR	Qualification
1	(France) RC Cannes	6	6	0	17	548	456	1.202	18	5	3.600	Round of 16
2	(Turkey) Eczacıbaşı VitrA Istanbul	6	4	2	10	583	553	1.054	14	12	1.167	Round of 16
3	(Italy) MC-Carnaghi Villa Cortese	6	2	4	8	524	542	0.967	12	13	0.923	Round of 16
4	(Germany) Schweriner SC	6	0	6	1	426	530	0.804	4	18	0.222	

Date	Time		Score		Set 1	Set 2	Set 3	Set 4	Set 5	Total	Report
29 Nov	19:00	Schweriner SC (Germany)	1–3	(Turkey) Eczacıbaşı VitrA	25–18	14–25	22–25	20–25		81–93	Report
30 Nov	20:00	RC Cannes (France)	3–1	(Italy) Villa Cortese	25–21	25–20	23–25	25–21		98–87	Report
6 Dec	18:00	Eczacıbaşı VitrA (Turkey)	1–3	(France) RC Cannes	25–23	23–25	18–25	20–25		86–98	Report
6 Dec	20:30	Villa Cortese (Italy)	3–1	(Germany) Schweriner SC	21–25	25–21	25–17	25–15		96–78	Report
14 Dec	20:30	Villa Cortese (Italy)	2–3	(Turkey) Eczacıbaşı VitrA	25–16	14–25	25–23	19–25	13–15	96–104	Report
15 Dec	20:00	RC Cannes (France)	3–0	(Germany) Schweriner SC	25–11	25–14	25–15			75–40	Report
20 Dec	19:00	Schweriner SC (Germany)	0–3	(France) RC Cannes	21–25	20–25	17–25			58–75	Report
22 Dec	18:00	Eczacıbaşı VitrA (Turkey)	3–1	(Italy) Villa Cortese	25–14	25–13	22–25	25–20		97–72	Report
10 Jan	19:00	Schweriner SC (Germany)	0–3	(Italy) Villa Cortese	21–25	22–25	17–25			60–75	Report
11 Jan	20:00	RC Cannes (France)	3–1	(Turkey) Eczacıbaşı VitrA	25–22	25–19	22–25	25–21		97–87	Report
17 Jan	17:00	Eczacıbaşı VitrA (Turkey)	3–2	(Germany) Schweriner SC	29–31	25–20	25–21	22–25	15–12	116–109	Report
17 Jan	20:30	Villa Cortese (Italy)	2–3	(France) RC Cannes	16–25	26–24	22–25	25–16	9–15	98–105	Report

=== Pool B ===
Pos	Team	Pld	W	L	Pts	SPW	SPL	SPR	SW	SL	SR	Qualification
1	(Turkey) Fenerbahçe Universal Istanbul	6	5	1	15	489	407	1.201	16	4	4.000	Round of 16
2	(Azerbaijan) Rabita Baku	6	5	1	15	467	382	1.223	15	4	3.750	Round of 16
3	(Germany) Dresdner SC	6	1	5	3	415	463	0.896	4	15	0.267	Round of 16
4	(France) ASPTT Mulhouse	6	1	5	3	346	465	0.744	3	16	0.188	

Date	Time		Score		Set 1	Set 2	Set 3	Set 4	Set 5	Total	Report
30 Nov	19:30	Fenerbahçe (Turkey)	3–0	(Germany) Dresdner SC	25–16	25–19	25–21			75–56	Report
1 Dec	17:00	Rabita Baku (Azerbaijan)	3–0	(France) ASPTT Mulhouse	25–15	25–13	25–21			75–49	Report
6 Dec	19:30	ASPTT Mulhouse (France)	0–3	(Turkey) Fenerbahçe	20–25	19–25	18–25			57–75	Report
7 Dec	19:00	Dresdner SC (Germany)	0–3	(Azerbaijan) Rabita Baku	22–25	19–25	21–25			62–75	Report
14 Dec	19:00	Dresdner SC (Germany)	1–3	(France) ASPTT Mulhouse	25–15	20–25	22–25	23–25		90–90	Report
15 Dec	19:30	Fenerbahçe (Turkey)	3–0	(Azerbaijan) Rabita Baku	25–20	29–27	25–18			79–65	Report
20 Dec	17:00	Rabita Baku (Azerbaijan)	3–1	(Turkey) Fenerbahçe	25–27	27–25	25–20	25–17		102–89	Report
20 Dec	20:00	ASPTT Mulhouse (France)	0–3	(Germany) Dresdner SC	23–25	18–25	11–25			52–75	Report
10 Jan	17:00	Rabita Baku (Azerbaijan)	3–0	(Germany) Dresdner SC	25–17	25–17	25–16			75–50	Report
11 Jan	19:30	Fenerbahçe (Turkey)	3–0	(France) ASPTT Mulhouse	25–17	25–16	25–12			75–45	Report
17 Jan	19:00	Dresdner SC (Germany)	1–3	(Turkey) Fenerbahçe	23–25	25–21	15–25	19–25		82–96	Report
17 Jan	20:00	ASPTT Mulhouse (France)	0–3	(Azerbaijan) Rabita Baku	16–25	20–25	17–25			53–75	Report

=== Pool C ===
Pos	Team	Pld	W	L	Pts	SPW	SPL	SPR	SW	SL	SR	Qualification
1	(Russia) Dinamo Kazan	6	5	1	14	536	475	1.128	16	7	2.286	Round of 16
2	(Poland) Atom Trefl Sopot	6	4	2	10	477	454	1.051	12	10	1.200	Round of 16
3	(Switzerland) Voléro Zürich	6	2	4	8	518	534	0.970	12	13	0.923	Round of 16
4	(Czech Republic) VK Modřanská Prostějov	6	1	5	4	444	507	0.876	6	16	0.375	Round of 16

Date	Time		Score		Set 1	Set 2	Set 3	Set 4	Set 5	Total	Report
30 Nov	19:00	Dinamo Kazan (Russia)	3–2	(Czech Republic) VK Prostějov	23–25	20–25	25–18	25–15	15–11	108–94	Report
30 Nov	20:15	Voléro Zürich (Switzerland)	2–3	(Poland) Atom Trefl Sopot	25–19	25–14	14–25	15–25	9–15	88–98	Report
7 Dec	18:00	VK Prostějov (Czech Republic)	1–3	(Switzerland) Voléro Zürich	21–25	12–25	25–15	15–25		73–90	Report
7 Dec	18:00	Atom Trefl Sopot (Poland)	0–3	(Russia) Dinamo Kazan	15–25	19–25	23–25			57–75	Report
13 Dec	18:00	Atom Trefl Sopot (Poland)	3–0	(Czech Republic) VK Prostějov	25–21	25–14	25–20			75–55	Report
15 Dec	20:15	Voléro Zürich (Switzerland)	1–3	(Russia) Dinamo Kazan	25–22	23–25	22–25	18–25		88–97	Report
21 Dec	18:00	VK Prostějov (Czech Republic)	0–3	(Poland) Atom Trefl Sopot	21–25	25–27	17–25			63–77	Report
21 Dec	19:00	Dinamo Kazan (Russia)	3–1	(Switzerland) Voléro Zürich	25–16	19–25	25–20	25–18		94–79	Report
11 Jan	17:00	Dinamo Kazan (Russia)	3–0	(Poland) Atom Trefl Sopot	25–21	25–16	25–23			75–60	Report
11 Jan	20:15	Voléro Zürich (Switzerland)	3–0	(Czech Republic) VK Prostějov	25–21	25–21	25–20			75–62	Report
17 Jan	17:00	VK Prostějov (Czech Republic)	3–1	(Russia) Dinamo Kazan	25–18	25–20	22–25	25–19		97–82	Report
17 Jan	20:30	Atom Trefl Sopot (Poland)	3–2	(Switzerland) Voléro Zürich	25–16	23–25	25–22	22–25	15–10	110–98	Report

=== Pool D ===
Pos	Team	Pld	W	L	Pts	SPW	SPL	SPR	SW	SL	SR	Qualification
1	(Turkey) VakıfBank TT Istanbul	6	5	1	14	492	419	1.174	15	6	2.500	Round of 16
2	(Azerbaijan) Azerrail Baku	6	4	2	13	511	472	1.083	15	7	2.143	Round of 16
3	(Italy) Volley Bergamo	6	2	4	7	486	509	0.955	10	13	0.769	Round of 16
4	(Romania) 2004 Tomis Constanța	6	1	5	2	392	481	0.815	3	17	0.176	

Date	Time		Score		Set 1	Set 2	Set 3	Set 4	Set 5	Total	Report
29 Nov	19:00	Tomis Constanța (Romania)	0–3	(Azerbaijan) Azerrail Baku	19–25	18–25	22–25			59–75	Report
30 Nov	20:30	Volley Bergamo (Italy)	0–3	(Turkey) VakıfBank	14–25	20–25	17–25			51–75	Report
7 Dec	18:00	Azerrail Baku (Azerbaijan)	3–1	(Italy) Volley Bergamo	25–15	25–19	22–25	25–22		97–81	Report
8 Dec	19:30	VakıfBank (Turkey)	3–0	(Romania) Tomis Constanța	25–20	25–19	25–16			75–55	Report
13 Dec	19:00	Tomis Constanța (Romania)	3–2	(Italy) Volley Bergamo	25–19	18–25	17–25	26–24	15–11	101–104	Report
14 Dec	18:00	Azerrail Baku (Azerbaijan)	3–0	(Turkey) VakıfBank	25–23	25–21	26–24			76–68	Report
20 Dec	19:30	VakıfBank (Turkey)	3–2	(Azerbaijan) Azerrail Baku	21–25	25–14	25–23	20–25	15–12	106–99	Report
22 Dec	20:30	Volley Bergamo (Italy)	3–0	(Romania) Tomis Constanța	25–11	25–23	25–22			75–56	Report
10 Jan	19:00	Tomis Constanța (Romania)	0–3	(Turkey) VakıfBank	18–25	19–25	23–25			60–75	Report
12 Jan	20:30	Volley Bergamo (Italy)	3–1	(Azerbaijan) Azerrail Baku	25–23	25–18	22–25	25–21		97–87	Report
17 Jan	19:00	Azerrail Baku (Azerbaijan)	3–0	(Romania) Tomis Constanța	25–20	25–16	27–25			77–61	Report
17 Jan	19:30	VakıfBank (Turkey)	3–1	(Italy) Volley Bergamo	25–13	25–20	18–25	25–20		93–78	Report

=== Pool E ===
Pos	Team	Pld	W	L	Pts	SPW	SPL	SPR	SW	SL	SR	Qualification
1	(Russia) Dinamo Moscow	6	4	2	13	499	455	1.097	14	8	1.750	Round of 16
2	(Italy) Scavolini Pesaro	6	4	2	12	453	411	1.102	13	6	2.167	Round of 16
3	(Poland) Bank BPS Fakro Muszyna	6	4	2	11	534	490	1.090	13	10	1.300	Round of 16
4	(Serbia) Crvena Zvezda Beograd	6	0	6	0	367	497	0.738	2	18	0.111	

Date	Time		Score		Set 1	Set 2	Set 3	Set 4	Set 5	Total	Report
30 Nov	18:00	Fakro Muszyna (Poland)	3–0	(Serbia) Crvena zvezda	25–17	25–23	25–18			75–58	Report
1 Dec	20:30	Scavolini Pesaro (Italy)	3–0	(Russia) Dinamo Moscow	25–21	25–17	25–19			75–57	Report
7 Dec	18:00	Crvena zvezda (Serbia)	0–3	(Italy) Scavolini Pesaro	10–25	23–25	13–25			46–75	Report
8 Dec	19:00	Dinamo Moscow (Russia)	2–3	(Poland) Fakro Muszyna	25–23	26–28	25–15	15–25	8–15	99–106	Report
14 Dec	20:00	Dinamo Moscow (Russia)	3–0	(Serbia) Crvena zvezda	25–17	25–14	25–19			75–50	Report
15 Dec	20:30	Scavolini Pesaro (Italy)	1–3	(Poland) Fakro Muszyna	22–25	20–25	26–24	20–25		88–99	Report
21 Dec	18:00	Crvena zvezda (Serbia)	1–3	(Russia) Dinamo Moscow	18–25	25–23	21–25	14–25		78–98	Report
21 Dec	20:30	Fakro Muszyna (Poland)	0–3	(Italy) Scavolini Pesaro	23–25	22–25	26–28			71–78	Report
11 Jan	18:00	Fakro Muszyna (Poland)	1–3	(Russia) Dinamo Moscow	22–25	19–25	25–19	18–25		84–94	Report
12 Jan	20:30	Scavolini Pesaro (Italy)	3–0	(Serbia) Crvena zvezda	25–23	25–17	25–22			75–62	Report
17 Jan	18:00	Crvena zvezda (Serbia)	1–3	(Poland) Fakro Muszyna	15–25	15–25	26–24	17–25		73–99	Report
17 Jan	19:00	Dinamo Moscow (Russia)	3–0	(Italy) Scavolini Pesaro	26–24	25–18	25–20			76–62	Report

== Knockout stage ==
=== Round of 16 ===
Team 1	Agg.	Team 2	1st leg	2nd leg
Modřanská Prostějov (Czech Republic)	0–2	(Turkey) Fenerbahçe Universal	1–3	0–3
Atom Trefl Sopot (Poland)	1–1^{1}	(Azerbaijan) Rabita Baku	3–1	1–3
Dresdner SC (Germany)	0–2	(Russia) Dinamo Kazan	0–3	0–3
Voléro Zürich (Switzerland)	0–2	(Azerbaijan) Azerrail Baku	1–3	0–3
Bank BPS Fakro Muszyna (Poland)	0–2	(France) RC Cannes	0–3	0–3
Eczacıbaşı VitrA (Turkey)	0–2	(Turkey) VakıfBank Türk Telekom	1–3	2–3
Volley Bergamo (Italy)	2–0	(Italy) Scavolini Pesaro	3–0	3–1
MC-Carnaghi Villa Cortese (Italy)	2–0	(Russia) Dinamo Moscow	3–2	3–0

^{1}Rabita Baku won the golden set 15–6.

==== First leg ====
Date	Time		Score		Set 1	Set 2	Set 3	Set 4	Set 5	Total	Report
1 Feb	17:00	Prostějov (Czech Republic)	1–3	(Turkey) Fenerbahçe	25–23	23–25	17–25	16–25		81–98	Report
1 Feb	19:00	Dresdner SC (Germany)	0–3	(Russia) Dinamo Kazan	12–25	20–25	13–25			45–75	Report
1 Feb	20:15	Voléro Zürich (Switzerland)	1–3	(Azerbaijan) Azerrail Baku	19–25	25–22	24–26	16–25		84–98	Report
1 Feb	20:30	Atom Trefl Sopot (Poland)	3–1	(Azerbaijan) Rabita Baku	22–25	25–22	25–20	26–24		98–91	Report
1 Feb	20:30	Villa Cortese (Italy)	3–2	(Russia) Dinamo Moscow	25–20	25–18	18–25	23–25	15–12	106–100	Report
2 Feb	18:00	Fakro Muszyna (Poland)	0–3	(France) RC Cannes	19–25	18–25	19–25			56–75	Report
2 Feb	19:00	Eczacıbaşı VitrA (Turkey)	1–3	(Turkey) VakıfBank TT	22–25	21–25	25–20	20–25		88–95	Report
2 Feb	20:30	Volley Bergamo (Italy)	3–0	(Italy) Scavolini Pesaro	25–16	25–20	25–22			75–58	Report

==== Second leg ====
Date	Time		Score		Set 1	Set 2	Set 3	Set 4	Set 5	Total	Report
7 Feb	20:00	RC Cannes (France)	3–0	(Poland) Fakro Muszyna	25–22	25–18	25–16			75–56	Report
8 Feb	18:00	Azerrail Baku (Azerbaijan)	3–0	(Switzerland) Voléro Zürich	25–17	25–18	25–14			75–49	Report
9 Feb	17:00	Rabita Baku (Azerbaijan)	3–1	(Poland) Atom Trefl Sopot	21–25	25–14	25–20	25–20		96–79	Report
9 Feb	17:00	VakıfBank TT (Turkey)	3–2	(Turkey) Eczacıbaşı VitrA	20–25	25–22	22–25	25–21	15–13	107–106	Report
9 Feb	18:00	Dinamo Kazan (Russia)	3–0	(Germany) Dresdner SC	25–22	25–16	25–16			75–54	Report
9 Feb	19:30	Dinamo Moscow (Russia)	0–3	(Italy) Villa Cortese	15–25	22–25	23–25			60–75	Report
9 Feb	20:00	Fenerbahçe (Turkey)	3–0	(Czech Republic) Prostějov	27–25	25–19	25–14			77–58	Report
9 Feb	20:30	Scavolini Pesaro (Italy)	1–3	(Italy) Volley Bergamo	14–25	26–24	17–25	25–27		82–101	Report

=== Quarterfinals ===
In case of a tie - 1 match won and 1 match lost and not depending on the final score of both matches - the teams have to play a golden set to determine which one qualifies for the next round.

Team 1	Agg.	Team 2	1st leg	2nd leg
Rabita Baku (Azerbaijan)	0–2	(Turkey) Fenerbahçe	0–3	0–3
Dinamo Kazan (Russia)	^{1}1–1	(Azerbaijan) Azerrail Baku	3–1	0–3
VakıfBank Türk Telekom (Turkey)	1–1^{3}	(France) RC Cannes	3–0	2–3
Villa Cortese (Italy)	^{2}1–1	(Italy) Volley Bergamo	3–1	2–3

^{1}Dinamo Kazan won the golden set 15–10

^{2}Villa Cortese won the golden set 15–11

^{3}RC Cannes won the golden set 18–16

==== First leg ====
Date	Time		Score		Set 1	Set 2	Set 3	Set 4	Set 5	Total	Report
22 Feb	17:00	Rabita Baku (Azerbaijan)	0–3	(Turkey) Fenerbahçe	13–25	24–26	19–25			56–76	Report
22 Feb	20:00	Dinamo Kazan (Russia)	3–1	(Azerbaijan) Azerrail Baku	22–25	25–23	25–22	25–21		97–91	Report
23 Feb	19:00	VakıfBank TT (Turkey)	3–0	(France) RC Cannes	25–23	25–21	25–11			75–55	Report
23 Feb	20:30	Villa Cortese (Italy)	3–1	(Italy) Volley Bergamo	21–25	25–15	25–20	25–19		96–79	Report

==== Second leg ====
Date	Time		Score		Set 1	Set 2	Set 3	Set 4	Set 5	Total	Report
28 Feb	18:00	Azerrail Baku (Azerbaijan)	3–0	(Russia) Dinamo Kazan	25–21	25–23	25–11			75–55	Report
29 Feb	19:30	Fenerbahçe (Turkey)	3–0	(Azerbaijan) Rabita Baku	25–20	25–17	25–20			75–57	Report
29 Feb	20:30	Volley Bergamo (Italy)	3–2	(Italy) Villa Cortese	26–24	25–27	25–18	20–25	18–16	114–110	Report
1 Mar	20:00	RC Cannes (France)	3-2	(Turkey) VakıfBank TT	19-25	25–14	16–25	25–21	17–15	102–75	Report

== Final four ==
The final four will be held at Baku, Azerbaijan.

=== Bracket ===
Semifinals
2012 – Baku
(Turkey) Fenerbahçe	3
(Russia) Dinamo Kazan	1
2012 – Baku
(France) RC Cannes	3
(Italy) Villa Cortese	1

Final
2012 – Baku
(Turkey) Fenerbahçe	3
(France) RC Cannes	0
Third place
2012 – Baku
(Russia) Dinamo Kazan	3
(Italy) Villa Cortese	1

=== Semifinals ===
Date	Time		Score		Set 1	Set 2	Set 3	Set 4	Set 5	Total	Report
24 Mar	19:30	Fenerbahçe (Turkey)	3–1	(Russia) Dinamo Kazan	17–25	25–23	25–17	25–18		92–83	Report
24 Mar	16:30	RC Cannes (France)	3–1	(Italy) Villa Cortese	25–17	26–24	27–29	25–15		103–85	Report

=== Third place game ===
Date	Time		Score		Set 1	Set 2	Set 3	Set 4	Set 5	Total	Report
25 Mar	16:00	Dinamo Kazan (Russia)	3–1	(Italy) Villa Cortese	25–13	25–17	24–26	25–23		99–79	Report

=== Final ===
Date	Time		Score		Set 1	Set 2	Set 3	Set 4	Set 5	Total	Report
25 Mar	19:00	Fenerbahçe (Turkey)	3–0	(France) RC Cannes	25–14	25–22	25–20			75–56	Report

== Final standing ==
Rank	Team
1st place, gold medalist(s)	(Turkey) Fenerbahçe
2nd place, silver medalist(s)	(France) RC Cannes
3rd place, bronze medalist(s)	(Russia) Dinamo Kazan
4	(Italy) Villa Cortese

2011–12 Women's Club European Champions

1st title

Roster for Final Four
Fabiana Claudino, Nihan Güneyligil, Merve Dalbeler, Lyubov Sokolova, Yağmur Koçyiğit, Duygu Bal, Seda Tokatlıoğlu, Kim Yeon-koung, Naz Aydemir, Seda Eryüz, Eda Erdem and Logan Tom
Head coach
Zé Roberto

== Awards ==
- MVP: (South Korea) Kim Yeon-Koung (Fenerbahçe)
- Best scorer: (South Korea) Kim Yeon-Koung (Fenerbahçe)
- Best setter: (Turkey) Naz Aydemir (Fenerbahçe)
- Best blocker: (Russia) Maria Borisenko (Dinamo Kazan)
- Best server: (United States) Makare Wilson (Villa Cortese)
- Best spiker: (Canada) Sarah Pavan (Villa Cortese)
- Best receiver: (United States) Jordan Larson (Dinamo Kazan)
- Best libero: (Italy) Paola Cardullo (RC Cannes)
