= Naz Aydemir =

Turkish volleyball player (born 1990)

- Aydemir with Galatasaray in 2025

Personal information
- Full name: Naz Aydemir Akyol
- Nationality: Turkish
- Born: 14 August 1990 (age 36); Istanbul, Turkey
- Height: 1.86 m (6 ft 1 in)
- Weight: 65 kg (143 lb)
- Spike: 303 cm (119 in)
- Block: 300 cm (118 in)

Volleyball information
- Position: Setter
- Current club: VakıfBank

Career
Years	Teams
2004–2009; 2009–2012; 2012–2018; 2019–2022; 2022–2023; 2023–2025; 2025–2026; 2026–	Eczacıbaşı Zentiva; Fenerbahçe Universal; Vakıfbank; Fenerbahçe Opet; Türk Hava Yolları; Eczacıbaşı Dynavit; Galatasaray Daikin; VakıfBank

National team
2004-2021	Turkey
Medal record
Women's volleyball
Representing Turkey
World Grand Prix
Bronze medal – third place	2012 Ningbo	Team
European Championships
Silver medal – second place	2019 Turkey	Team
Bronze medal – third place	2017 Azerbaijan/Georgia	Team
Bronze medal – third place	2011 Italy/Serbia	Team
European Games
Gold medal – first place	2015 Baku	Team
Montreux Volley Masters
Gold medal – first place	2015 Montreux	Team
European League
Silver medal – second place	2009 Kayseri	Team
Bronze medal – third place	2010 Ankara	Team
Mediterranean Games
Silver medal – second place	2009 Pescara	Team
Silver medal – second place	2013 Mersin	Team
FIVB Nations League
Bronze medal – third place	2021 Rimini	Team

Naz Aydemir Akyol (born 14 August 1990) is a Turkish volleyball player. She plays as a setter for VakıfBank and the Turkey women's national volleyball team.

She has won a total of nine Turkish League championships, four with Vakıfbank, three with Eczacıbaşı and two with Fenerbahçe. She has four CEV Champions League championships, winning three with Vakıfbank and one with Fenerbahçe. She also has three FIVB Club World Championship, winning two with Vakıfbank and one with Fenerbahçe. She was part of the Turkey national team at the 2012 and 2020 Summer Olympics.

== Career ==
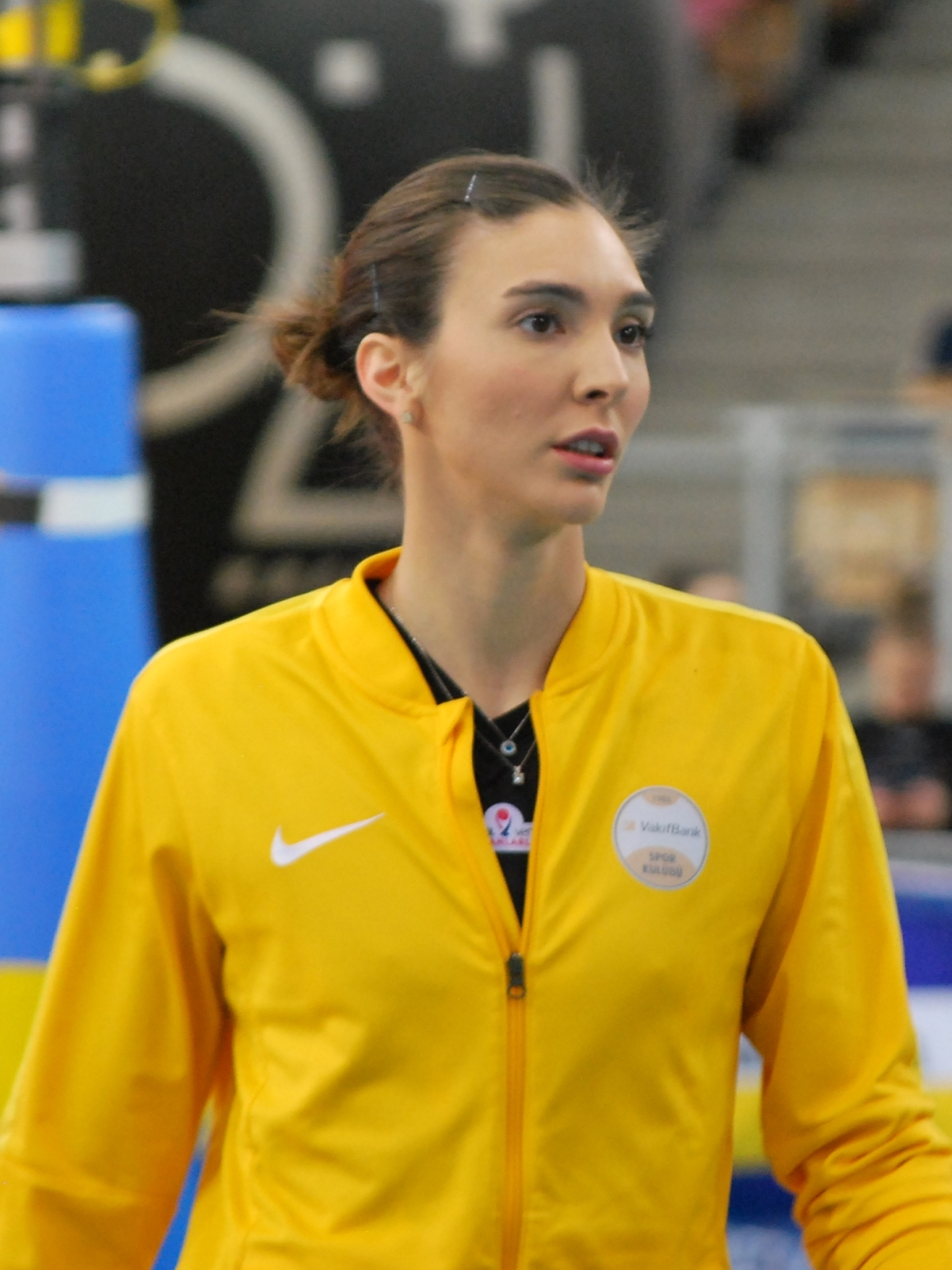
Aydemir with Vakıfbank in 2018

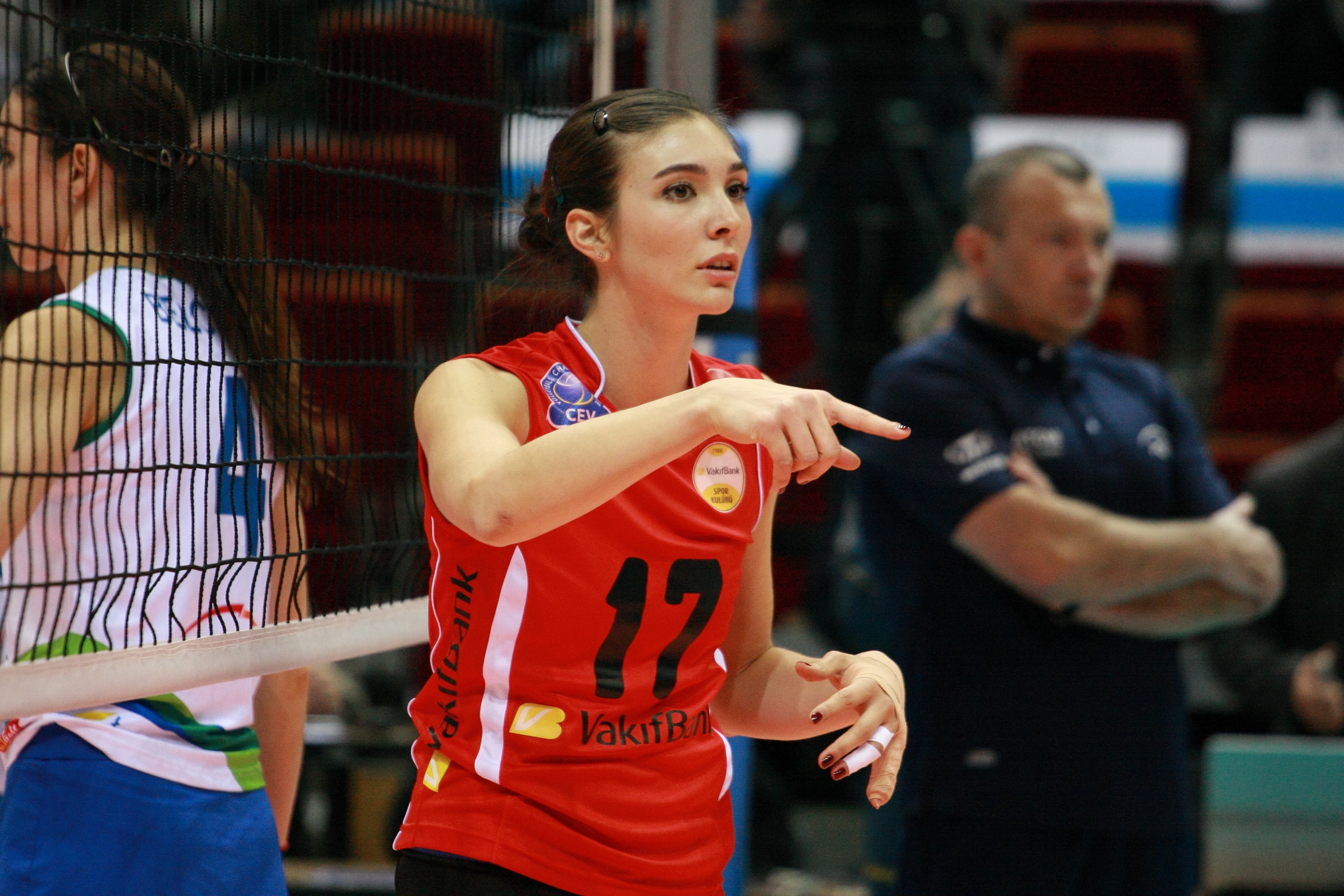
Naz Aydemir playing for VakıfBank in the CEV Champions League, 2013

Aydemir has played more than 200 times for all levels of the Turkish national team. She has played 16 seasons of CEV Champions League and achieved an unprecedented record by playing in the CEV Champions League final fours 10 times in a row. She has played for the senior level club volleyball since the 2004–05 season. She was the captain of the youth national team of Turkey who won the silver medal at the 2007 World Championship. In the 2008 edition of the Junior European Championship, she led the Turkish team to a bronze medal and won the Most Valuable Player (MVP) award for the tournament.

In the 2011–12 edition and 2012–13 edition of the CEV Champions League, Aydemir won the championships and Best Setter awards consecutively, with her clubs Fenerbahçe and Vakıfbank.

Aydemir won her first FIVB Women's Club World Championship gold medal at the 2010 Club World Championship. Fenerbahçe was the first Turkish team to win the FIVB Women's Club World Championship. She won her second gold medal at the 2013 Club World Championship playing with Vakıfbank which became the second Turkish team to win the Club World Championship.

Aydemir won the silver medal in the 2013–14 CEV Champions League when her club VakıfBank defeated Eczacıbaşı VitrA in the semifinal but then lost to Dinamo Kazan in the Championship match. She was the recipient of the tournament's Fair Play special award.

Aydemir won the 2016–17 CEV Champions League gold medal with VakıfBank when her team defeated the Imoco Volley Conegliano. She was also individually awarded Best Setter.

After spending six years at Vakıfbank Istanbul, she took a break from her volleyball career due to her pregnancy. After giving birth to her child, she returned to her old club Fenerbahçe Opet in the 2019–2020 season.

Aydemir was selected for Roster 100 by FIVB as one of the 100 most influential volleyball players between 2010 and 2020, being one of the six female setters in the selection.

She signed a 1-year contract with Galatasaray on June 12, 2025.

== Personal life ==
Aydemir's cousin İlkay Gündoğan is a footballer for Galatasaray and Germany national team.

On 21 August 2013, Naz Aydemir married national basketball player and member of Galatasaray, Cenk Akyol.

On 6 November 2018, the couple had a son, Pamir.

== Awards ==
=== Individuals ===
- 2003 Turkish Youth Championship "Best Setter"
- 2004 Youth Balkan Cup "Best Setter"
- 2005 Youth European Championship Qualifiers "Most Valuable Player" & "Best Setter"
- 2006 Youth Balkan Cup "Most Valuable Player" & "Best Setter"
- 2006 Junior Balkan Cup "Best Setter"
- 2007 European Youth Olympic Festival "Player with Best Fundamental"
- 2007 Youth Black Sea Games "Best Setter"
- 2008 Junior European Championship "Most Valuable Player"
- 2009–10 Turkish League Final Series "Best Setter"
- 2010–11 Turkish League Final Series "Best Setter"
- 2011–12 CEV Champions League "Best Setter"
- 2012–13 CEV Champions League "Best Setter"
- 2012–13 Turkish League Final Series "Best Setter"
- 2013–14 CEV Champions League "Fair Play Award"
- 2014–15 Turkish League Final Series "Best Setter"
- 2015 Montreux Volley Masters "Best Setter"
- 2016–17 CEV Champions League "Best Setter"

=== National team ===
==== Youth team ====
- 2007 Girls Youth World Championship – Silver Medal

==== Junior team ====
- 2008 Junior European Championships – Bronze Medal

==== Senior team ====
- 2009 Mediterranean Games – Silver Medal
- 2009 European League – Silver Medal
- 2010 European League – Bronze Medal
- 2011 European Championship – Bronze Medal
- 2012 FIVB World Grand Prix – Bronze Medal
- 2013 Mediterranean Games – Silver Medal
- 2015 Montreux Volley Masters – Champion
- 2015 European Games – Gold Medal
- 2017 European Championship – Bronze Medal
- 2019 European Championship – Silver Medal
- 2021 Nations League – Bronze Medal

=== Club ===
- 2004–05 CEV Top Teams Cup – Bronze Medal, with Eczacıbaşı
- 2005–06 Turkish League Championship – Champion, with Eczacıbaşı
- 2006–07 Turkish League Championship – Champion, with Eczacıbaşı
- 2007–08 Turkish League Championship – Champion, with Eczacıbaşı
- 2008–09 Turkish Cup – Champion, with Eczacıbaşı
- 2009–10 Turkish Cup – Champion, with Fenerbahçe Acıbadem
- 2009–10 Turkish League Championship – Champion, with Fenerbahçe Acıbadem
- 2009–10 Turkish Super Cup – Champion, with Fenerbahçe Acıbadem
- 2009–10 CEV Champions League – Runner-Up, with Fenerbahçe Acıbadem
- 2010–11 Turkish Super Cup – Champion, with Fenerbahçe Acıbadem
- 2010 FIVB Club World Championship – Champion, with Fenerbahçe Acıbadem
- 2010–11 CEV Champions League – Bronze medal, with Fenerbahçe Acıbadem
- 2010–11 Turkish League Championship – Champion, with Fenerbahçe Acıbadem
- 2011–12 CEV Champions League – Champion, with Fenerbahçe Universal
- 2012–13 Turkish Cup – Champion, with Vakıfbank Spor Kulübü
- 2012–13 Turkish Champions Cup – Champion, with Vakıfbank Spor Kulübü
- 2012–13 CEV Champions League – Champion, with Vakıfbank Spor Kulübü
- 2012–13 Turkish Women's Volleyball League – Champion, with Vakıfbank Spor Kulübü
- 2013 FIVB Club World Championship – Champion, with Vakıfbank Istanbul
- 2013–14 CEV Champions League – Runner-Up, with VakıfBank İstanbul
- 2013–14 Turkish Women's Volleyball League – Champion, with Vakıfbank İstanbul
- 2013–14 Turkish Champions Cup – Champion, with Vakıfbank İstanbul
- 2013–14 Turkish Women's Volleyball Cup – Champion, with Vakıfbank İstanbul
- 2014–15 CEV Champions League – Bronze Medal, with Vakıfbank İstanbul
- 2014–15 Turkish Super Cup – Runner-Up, with Vakıfbank İstanbul
- 2015–16 CEV Champions League – Runner-Up, with Vakıfbank İstanbul
- 2016 FIVB Club World Championship – Bronze Medal, with Vakıfbank Istanbul
- 2016–17 CEV Champions League – Champion, with VakıfBank Istanbul
- 2017 FIVB Club World Championship – Champion, with Vakıfbank Istanbul
- 2017–18 Turkish Women's Volleyball League – Champion, with Vakıfbank İstanbul
- 2017–18 CEV Champions League – Champion, with VakıfBank Istanbul
- 2021 FIVB Club World Championship – Bronze Medal, with Fenerbahçe Opet
- 2025–26 CEV Cup – Champion, with Galatasaray

Awards
Preceded by (Turkey) Özge Kırdar Çemberci (United States) Carli Lloyd	Best Setter of CEV Women's Champions League; 2011-12; 2012-13; 2016-17	Succeeded by (Thailand) Nootsara Tomkom (Poland) Joanna Wołosz
