= Sabiha Gürayman =

Turkish volleyball player and construction engineer

- Born: Sabiha Rıfat Ecebilge; 1910; Manastır (present-day Bitola), Ottoman Empire
- Died: 4 January 2003 (aged 92–93); İzmir, Turkey
- Occupation: Engineer

Sabiha Rıfat (Ecebilge) Gürayman (1910 – 4 January 2003) was a Turkish construction engineer and volleyball player. As Turkey's first female civil engineer, she served as chief engineer for 10 years at the construction of Anıtkabir, the mausoleum of Mustafa Kemal Atatürk, founder and first president of Turkey. She was the first female volleyball player of Fenerbahçe SK, and the first Turkish woman to engage in the game of volleyball.

== Early life and education ==
Sabiha Rıfat Ecebilge was born in 1910 in Manastır, Ottoman Empire (present-day Bitola, North Macedonia). She studied at Beşiktaş Esma Sultan Primary School. In 1925, she finished Nişantaşı Girls' Middle School; then continued to Istanbul Girls' High School. In 1927, she entered the Higher Engineer's School (present-day Istanbul Technical University). She was the first female student to attend that school. She and another female student called Melek graduated in 1933.

Sabiha Rıfat was involved in volleyball in university years, and was the captain of Fenerbahçe's volleyball team (1928 or 1929). She was nicknamed "Uçan Parmaklar" (Flying Fingers) by the team's fans.

== Career ==
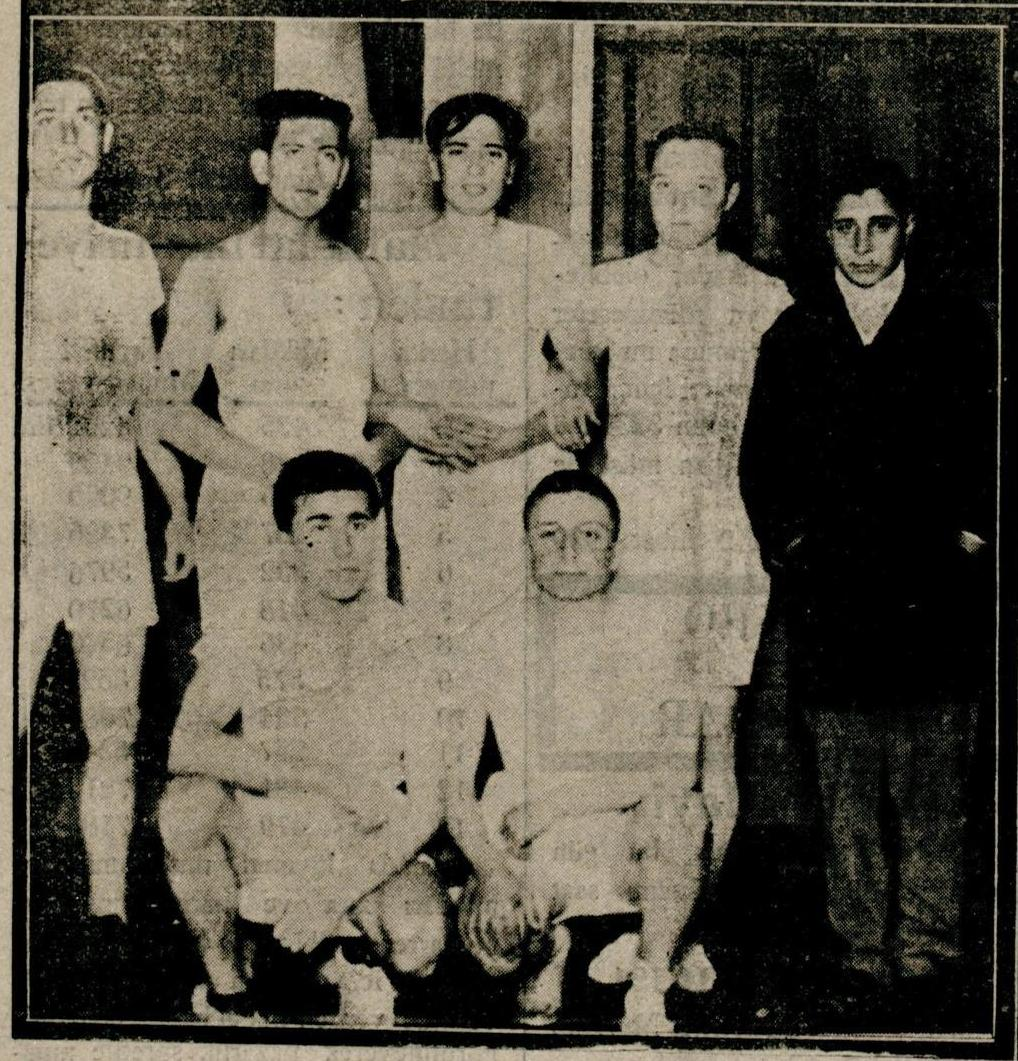
Sabiha Rıfat (Ecebilge) Gürayman with her teammates from Fenerbahçe volleyball team in 1929.

She began her career at the Ankara Public Works Directorate, then the Ministry of Public Works. In 1933–1934, she designed two secondary schools in Erzurumçeşmesi and Kabaküllük districts of Ankara and took part in the construction of government buildings, and the official construction of Anitkabir and the Turkish Grand National Assembly (TBMM). A photograph of Anıtkabir's headquarters in the Hürriyet Tower is exhibited during construction. The bridge was called "Girls' Bridge" by local people because of the construction of "Kemer Bridge" in the Beypazarı district of Ankara. She often wore trousers on site which was unusual.

In 1941, she was chief of the Coordination Office and the control chief of the construction of the Grand National Assembly of Turkey. When Ekrem Demirtaş, the supervisor of the construction of Anıtkabir, resigned on 29 December 1945, she took on the role for the next decade until the end of the construction. She always appeared before the visitors to the construction site as the person in charge. A woman engineer running the construction of Anıtkabir aroused interest in the world; Greek Prime Minister Sofoklis Venizelos commented "For the first time in my life, I see a woman in charge of such a significant work. I congratulate you."

She retired in 1963.

== Personal life ==
In 1939 she married Remzi Gürayman, a graduate engineer who had been a fellow student. She then used the surname Gürayman. The couple had no children. Gürayman moved to Izmir from Istanbul after her husband died in 1993 and settled with her niece Beyhan Susup.

Sabiha Gürayman died on 4 January 2003 in İzmir and was buried in Doğançay Cemetery. She left money for scholarships at Istanbul Technical University Foundation and the Fevzi Akkaya Foundation for Basic Education.
