= Özgenur Yurtdagülen =

Turkish volleyball player (born 1993)

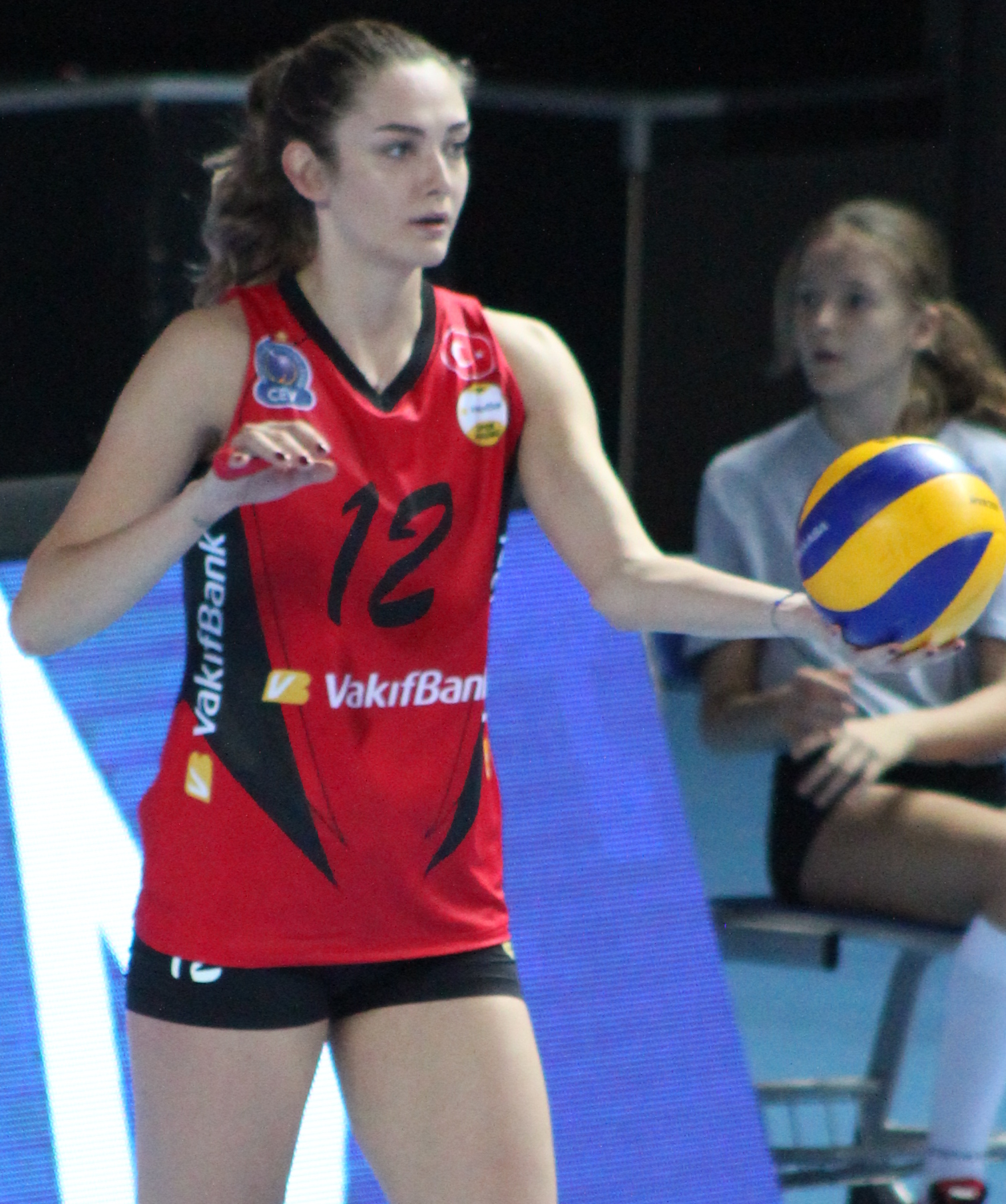
- Yurtdagülen in 2016

Personal information
- Born: August 6, 1993 (age 33) Istanbul, Turkey
- Height: 1.93 m (6 ft 4 in)
- Weight: 67 kg (148 lb)
- Spike: 290 cm (114 in) (9.5 ft)
- Block: 285 cm (112 in) (9.35 ft)

Volleyball information
- Position: Middle Blocker
- Current club: Beşiktaş JK

Career
- Years: Team
- 2004–2012; 2012–2015; 2015–2016; 2016–2017; 2017–2019; 2019–2021; 2021–2022; 2022–2024; 2024–2025; 2025–2026; 2026–: Yeşilyurt; Galatasaray; Sarıyer Belediyespor; VakıfBank S.K.; Nilüfer Belediyespor; Türk Hava Yolları; Mert Grup Sigorta; Aydın Büyükşehir Belediyespor; Bahçelievler Belediyespor; Aras Kargo; Beşiktaş JK

National team
- Years: Team
- 2012–2018: Turkey
Honours
Women's volleyball
Representing Turkey
Women's European Volleyball League
| Gold medal – first place | 2014 Germany/Turkey | Team |
Women's U23 World Championship
| Silver medal – second place | 2015 Ankara | Team |
Montreux Volley Masters
| Bronze medal – third place | 2016 Montrö | Team |
Mediterranean Games
| Bronze medal – third place | 2018 Tarragona | Team |

Özgenur Yurtdagülen, a.k.a. Özge Nur Yurtdagülen, (born August 6, 1993) is a Turkish female volleyball player. She is 192 cm (6.30 ft) tall at 73 kg (161 lb). Currently, she plays for Beşiktaş JK in the middle blocker position. Yurtdagülen is a member of the Turkey women's national volleyball team.

== Career ==
=== Education ===
Yurtdagülen studied Business Administration at Bahçeşehir University.

=== Clubs ===
Yurtdagülen began her sports career at the age of eleven in Yeşilyurt, and played there in all age categories. In June 2012, she transferred to Galatasaray. She later played for Sarıyer Belediyespor, VakıfBank S.K., Nilüfer Belediyespor, Türk Hava Yolları, Mert Grup Sigorta, Aydın Büyükşehir Belediyespor, Bahçelievler Belediyespor, Aras Kargo, before joining Beşiktaş JK in June 2026.

=== National team ===
She played in the Turkey girl's and junior women's national team. She was called up to the Turkey women's national volleyball team, and played at the 2014 Women's European Volleyball League that won the gold medal.

== Awards ==
Galatasaray

- Turkish Super Cup runner-up: 2012

Vakıfbank

- CEV Women's Champions League: 2016–17
- FIVB Volleyball Women's Club World Championship: 2017
- Turkish Women's Volleyball Cup runner-up: 2016–17

Türk Hava Yolları

- Women's Volleyball Balkan Cup: 2019–20

National team

- 2014 Women's European Volleyball League - (gold) champion
- 2015 FIVB Volleyball Women's U23 World Championship - Silver
- 2016 Montreux Volley Masters - Bronze
- 2018 Mediterranean Games - Bronze

== See also ==
- Turkish women in sports
