= İpek (surname) =

İpek is a Turkish word. As surname, it may refer to:

- Akın İpek (born 1963), Turkish businessman
- Hidayet İpek (1919–2014), Turkish military officer and politician
- Melike İpek Yalova (born 1984), Turkish actress

== See also ==
- İpek (given name)
