= Derici =

Derici is a Turkish surname. Notable people with the surname include:

- İpek Derici (born 1990), Turkish basketball player
- İrem Derici (born 1987), Turkish singer and songwriter
- Okan Derici (born 1993), Turkish footballer
