= Arelya Karasoy Koçaş =

Turkish volleyball player (born 1996)

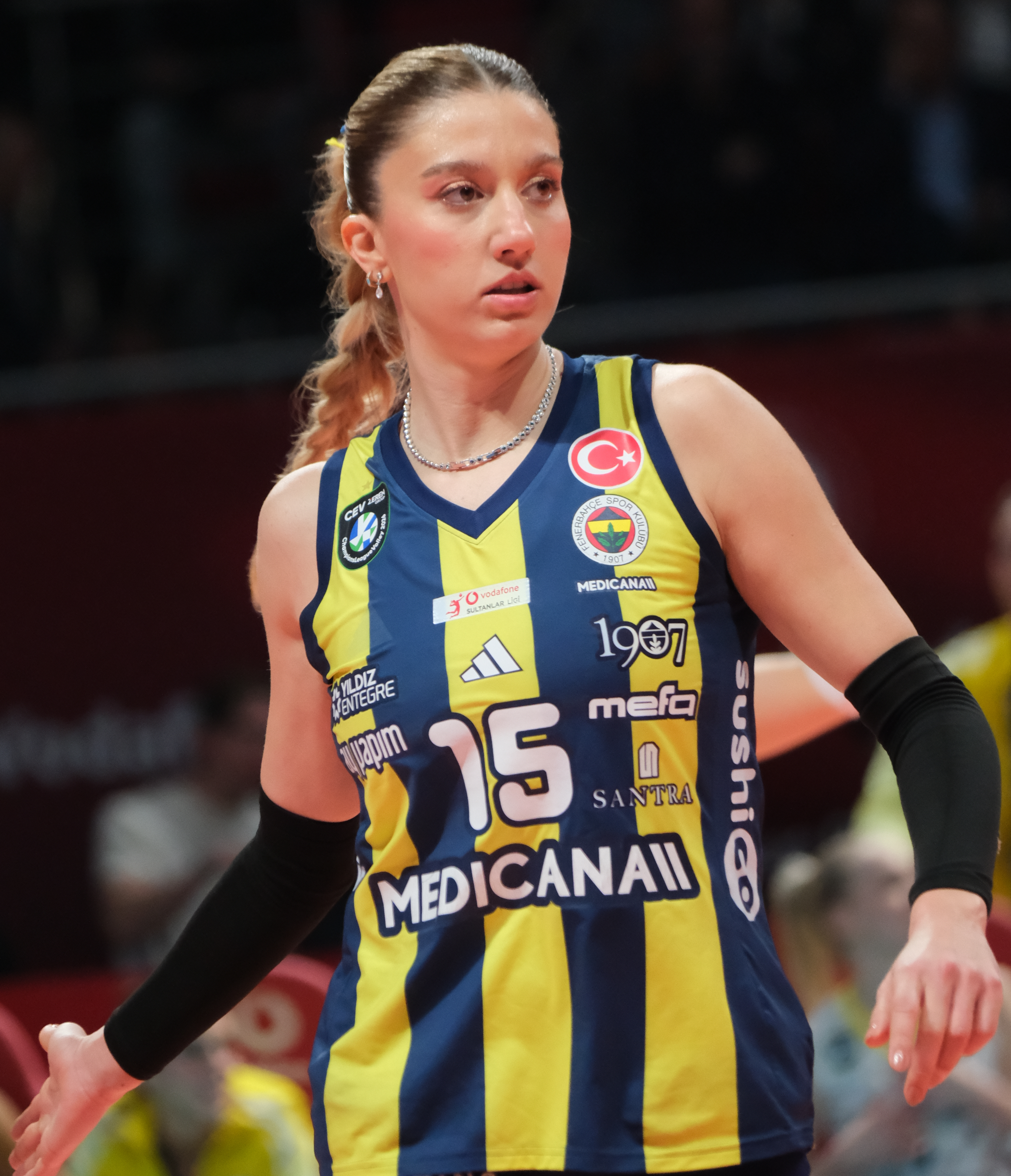
- Arelya Karasoy in 2026

Personal information
- Born: 14 December 1996 (age 29); Ankara, Turkey
- Height: 1.82 m (6 ft 0 in)
- Weight: 73 kg (161 lb)
- Spike: 291 cm (115 in)
- Block: 284 cm (112 in)

Volleyball information
- Position: Setter
- Current club: Fenerbahçe Medicana
- Number: 15

Career
Years
- 2006-2010
- 2010-2013
- 2013-2017
- 2014-2017
- 2017-2018
- 2018-2020
- 2020
- 2020-2023
- 2023-2024
- 2024-
Teams
- VakıfBank II
- TVF Sport High School
- Eczacıbaşı
- → Sarıyer (loan)
- Beylikdüzü
- Beşiktaş
- Aydın Büyükşehir Belediyespor
- Kuzeyboru
- Neptunes de Nantes
- Fenerbahçe Medicana

National team
- 2014-2017
- Turkey
Honours
Women's volleyball
Representing Turkey
Mediterranean Games
Gold medal – first place	2026 Taranto	Team

Arelya Karasoy Koçaş (born 14 December 1996 in Ankara) is a Turkish volleyball player. She is 182 cm (5.97 ft) tall at 73 kg (161 lb) and plays in the setter position. She plays for Fenerbahçe Medicana and wears number 15.

== Club career ==
She started her career by playing for VakıfBank II between 2006 and 2010. Later, she played for the TVF Sports High School team in the Turkish Volleyball 1. League for three years.

She was transferred to Eczacıbaşı for the 2013–14 season, but the following season she played on loan at Sarıyer for three years. In the 2017–18 season, she was transferred to Beylikdüzü, then to Beşiktaş in the following season, and to Aydın Büyükşehir Belediyespor in the middle of the following year. She signed a contract with Kuzeyboru in the 2020–21 season.

In 2023, she transferred to France for Neptunes de Nantes.

Finally she plays for Fenerbahçe Medicana as of the 2024–25 season. On 12 October 2024, she made her debut with the team against Nilüfer Belediyespor in a Sultanlar Ligi match.

== International career ==
She was called up to the Turkey national team, and won the gold medal at the 2026 Mediterranean Games in Taranto, Utaly.

== Awards ==
=== Club ===
- (bronze) 2013-14 Turkish Women's Volleyball League – (with Eczacıbaşı)
- (bronze) 2013-14 Turkish Cup – (with Eczacıbaşı)
- (gold) 2018 BVA Cup – } (with Beşiktaş)
- (silver) 2023–24 CEV Women's Challenge Cup – (with Neptunes de Nantes)
- (silver) 2023–24 French Championship – (with Neptunes de Nantes)
- (gold) 2023–24 French Cup – (with Neptunes de Nantes)
- (gold) 2024 Turkish Super Cup – (with Fenerbahçe Medicana)
- (gold) 2024–25 Turkish Cup – (with Fenerbahçe Medicana)
- (gold) 2025 Turkish Super Cup – (with Fenerbahçe Medicana)

=== International ===
- (gold) 2026 Mediterranean Games

=== Individual ===
- 2023–24 French Cup Final MVP

== See also ==
- Turkish women in sports
