= Buse Ünal =

Turkish volleyball player

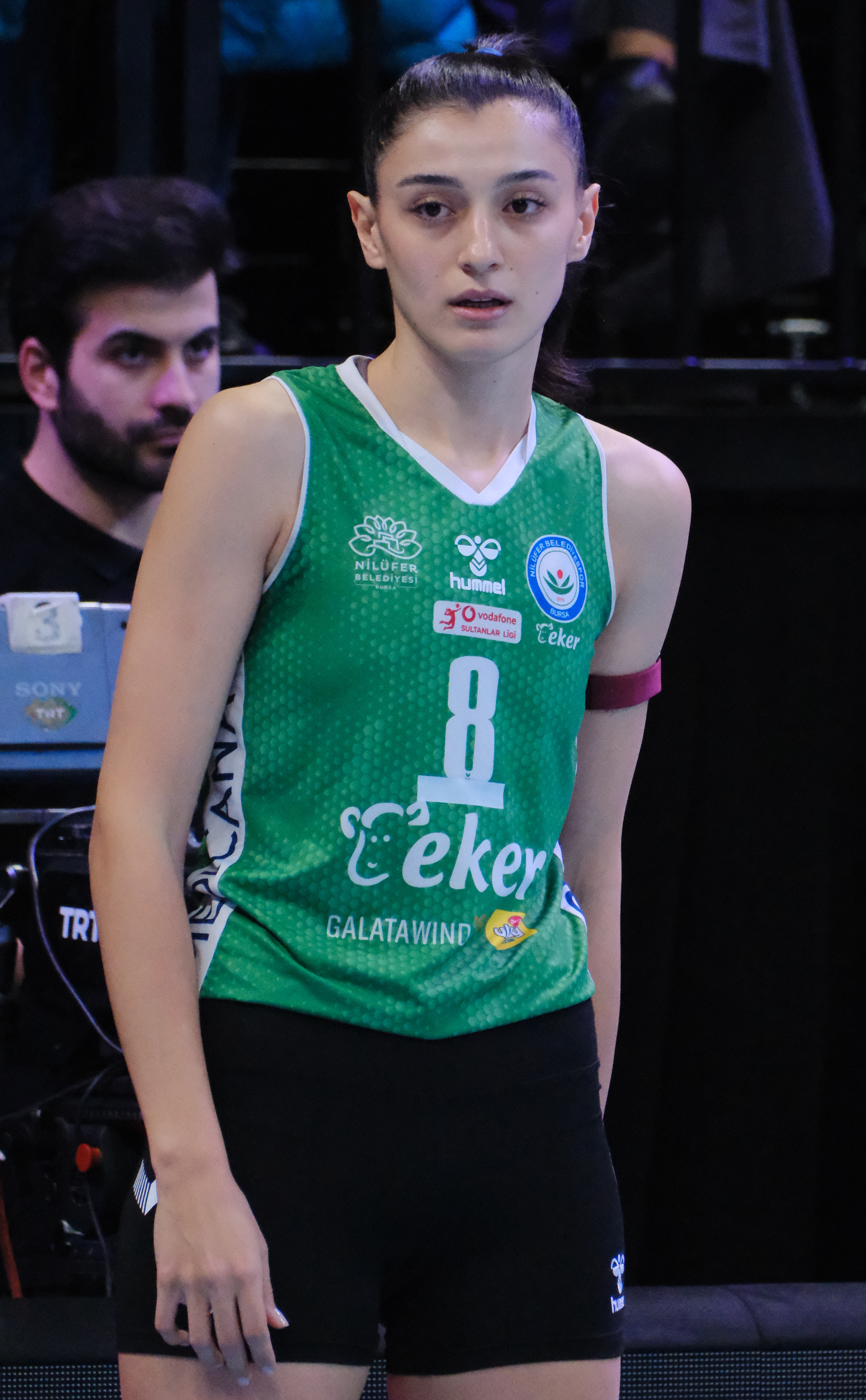
- Ünal in 2026

Personal information
- Born: 29 July 1997 (age 29); Ankara, Turkey
- Height: 1.86 m (6 ft 1 in)
- Weight: 72 kg (159 lb)
- Spike: 280 cm (110 in)
- Block: 270 cm (110 in)

Volleyball information
- Position: Setter
- Current club: (Turkey) Nilufer Volleyball

National team
2018–	Turkey
Honours
Women's volleyball
Representing Turkey
FIVB Nations League
Gold medal – first place	2026 Macau	Team
Women's European Volleyball Championship
Bronze medal – third place	2021 Serbia/Bulgaria/Croatia/Romania	Team
Mediterranean Games
Bronze medal – third place	2018 Tarragona	Team

Buse Ünal (born 29 July 1997) is a Turkish women's volleyball player. She is 1.86 m (6 ft 1 in) tall at 72 kg (159 lb) and plays in the setter position. Currently, she plays for Bahçelievler Belediyespor. She is a member of the Turkey women's national volleyball team.

== Early life ==
Buse Ünal was born into a family of athletes in Ankara, Turkey on 29 July 1997. Her father was a footballer and her mother a volleyball player, while her younger sister plays also volleyball. She completed primary and secondary school in İzmir and continued with her high school education in Ankara.

== Playing career ==
=== Club ===
Ünal started playing volleyball in the youth development team of Arkas Spor in İzmir, where she was a member for seven years during her school years. When the family resettled in Ankara, she joined the cadet team of Ilbank Ankara, where she played two years long. In 2013, her team took home the champion title of the Turkish cadet girls' championship. In the 2014–15 season, she was admitted to the senior team of Ilbank Ankara, which played then in the First League. After her team's relegation to the Second League, they were promoted to the First League at the end of the 2016–17 season.

After four seasons, Ünal left Ilbank Ankara, which was about to relegate again losing all of the twelve league matches in the mid of the 2017–18 First league. In January 2018, she signed with the successful Second League club Manisa Büyükşehir Belediyesi, which had chances to get promoted to the First League in the upcoming season.

She participated at the 2014–15 CEV Women's Challenge Cup with her team Ilbank Ankara.

Club	From	To
(Turkey) Ilbank Ankara	2014–2015	2017–2018
(Turkey) Manisa BBSK	2017–2018	

=== International ===
In March 2018, Ünal was admitted to the Turkey women's national volleyball team. She played in the 2018 FIVB Volleyball Women's Nations League for Turkey.
