= İpek (given name) =

- Gender: Female

Origin
- Language: Turkish
- Meaning: "Silk"

İpek is a common feminine Turkish given name. In Turkish, "İpek" means "Silk".

== People ==
- İpek Çalışlar, a writer
- İpek Derici (born 1990), a basketball player
- İpek Emiroğlu (born 1992), Turkish female football referee
- İpek Filiz Yazıcı (born 2001), Turkish actress
- İpek Kaya (born 1994), Turkish-French women's footballer
- İpek Özkök (born 1982), Turkish actress and model
- İpek Soroğlu (born 1985), Turkish volleyball player
- İpek Soylu (born 1996), Turkish tennis player
- İpek Şenoğlu (born 1979), a tennis player
- İpek Yaylacıoğlu (born 1984), Turkish actress

== Fictional characters ==
- İpek Hanım Yildiz, a fictional character in Orhan Pamuk's novel Snow
