= Aylin Uysalcan =

Turkish volleyball player (born 2009)

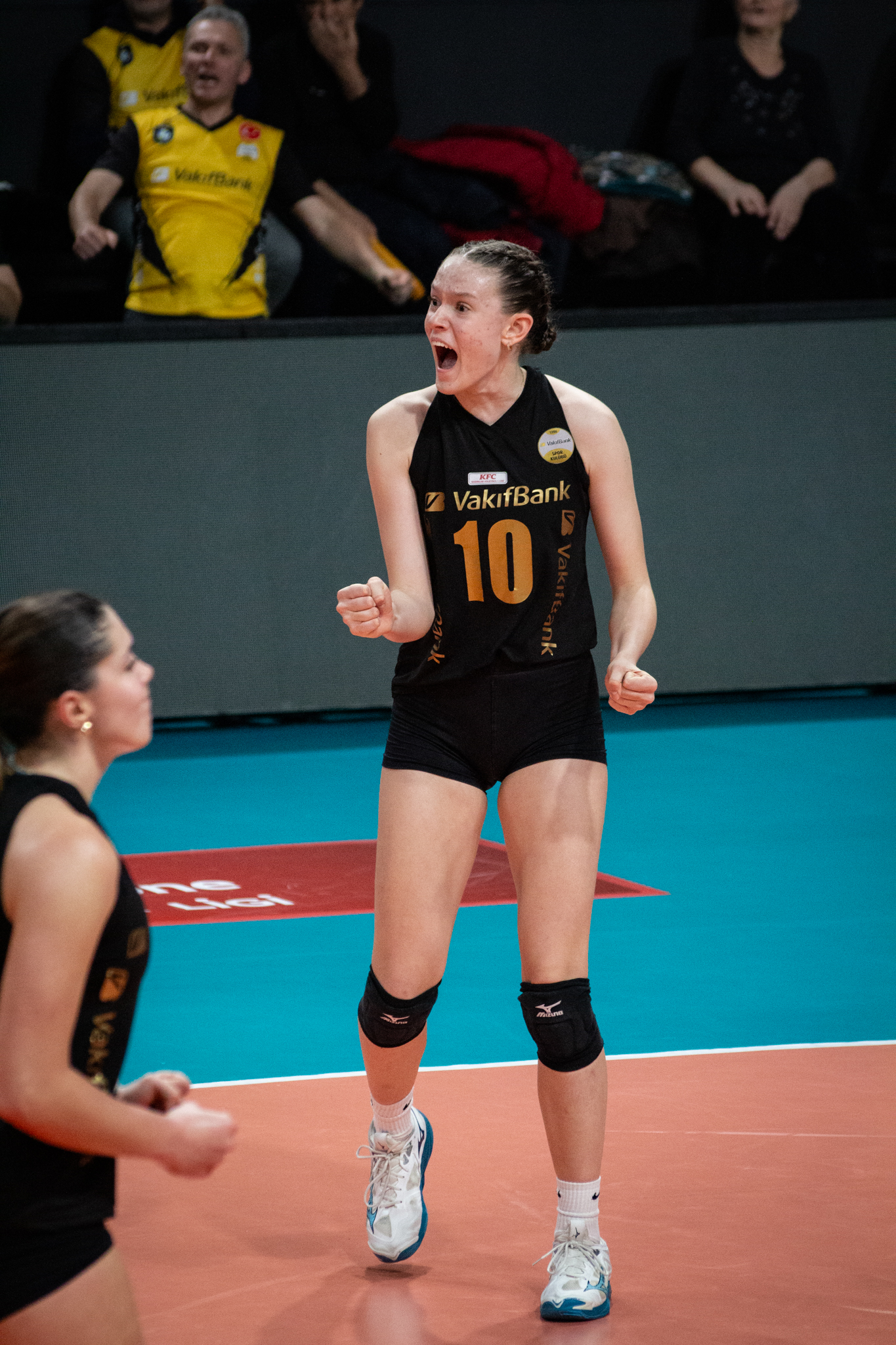
- Aylin Uysalcan (#10) of VakıfBank

Personal information
- Nationality: Turkey; Moldova
- Born: 13 July 2009 (age 17); Çorlu, Tekirdağ, Turkey
- Height: 196 cm (6 ft 5 in)
- Weight: 82 kg (181 lb)
- Spike: 320 cm (130 in)
- Block: 305 cm (120 in)

Volleyball information
- Position: Opposite/Outside Hitter
- Current club: VakıfBank
- Number: 10

Career
Years
- 2017–2021
- 2021–
Teams
- Çorlu Bld.
- VakıfBank

National team
- 2023
- 2024–2025
- 2025
- 2026
- Turkey U17
- Turkey U18
- Turkey U19
- Turkey
Honours
Women's volleyball
Representing Turkey
Mediterranean Games
Gold medal – first place	2026 Taranto	Team
Balkan U19 Championships
Silver medal – second place	2025 Farkë	U19 Team
European Youth Olympic Festival
Gold medal – first place	2025 Skopje	U18 Team
Balkan U18 Championships
Gold medal – first place	2024 Tirana	U18 Team
CEV European U16 Championship
Silver medal – second place	2023 Vrnjačka Banja	U17 Team
Balkan U17 Championships
Silver medal – second place	2023 Vrnjačka Banja	U17 Team

Aylin Uysalcan (born 13 July 2009) is a Turkish volleyball player. She is 196 cm (6 ft 5 in) tall at 82 kg (181 lb) and plays in the outside hitter position. She is right-handed, has 320 cm (130 in) spike height and 305 cm (120 in) block height. She plays for VakıfBank. Uysalcan played first in the girls' youth national team in 2023, and debuted in the women's national team in 2026. She has also Moldovan citizenship.

== Club career ==
Uysalcan developed interest in sports at an early age. She performed gymnastics for four years and played tennis for two years before she switched over to volleyball playing. She entered her hometown club Çorlu Bld. in 2017, and played in the 2020–21 Turkish Volleyball Regional League season. In 2021, she joined the youth team of VakıfBank. With the teams of different age groups, she enjoyed four times Turkish champions and twice Turkish runners-up titles.

Her team won the 2025–26 Turkish Women's Volleyball Cup, became champion of the 2025–26 Turkish Women's Volleyball League, and the 2025–26 CEV Women's Champions League.

== International career ==
=== Turkey U17 ===
Uysalcan won the silver medal with the Turkey women's U17 team at the 2023 Women's U17 Balkan Volleyball Championships in Vrnjačka Banja, Serbia. She took another silver medal at the 2023 Women's U17 European Volleyball Championship in Serbia.

=== Turkey U18 ===
In 2024, she became champion with the national U18 team at the 2024 Women's U18 Balkan Volleyball Championships in Tirana, Albania. She was named the "Most Valuable Player" and the "Best Opposite Hitter" of the championships. At the 2025 European Youth Summer Olympic Festival in Skopje, North Macedonia, she captured thr gold medal.

=== Turkey U19 ===
As part of the national U19 team, she took the silver medal at the Women's U19 Balkan Volleyball Championships in Farkë, Albania, and was named the "Best Opposite Hitter". She placed fourth at the 2025 FIVB Volleyball Girls' U19 World Championship in Osijek, Croatia.

=== Turkey ===
In 2025, Uysalcan was selected to the Turkey women's national volleyball team's broad squad. She is part of the national team at the 2026 FIVB Women's Volleyball Nations League in Brasília, Brazil. She won the gold medal at the 2026 Mediterranean Games in Taranto, Italy.

== Personal life ==
Aylin Uysalcan was born in Çorlu District of Tekirdağ Province, northwestern Turkey on 13 July 2009. She also has Moldovan citizenship.

== Honours ==
=== Club ===
VakıfBank

Turkish Women's Volleyball League
(gold) (1): 2025–26

Turkish Women's Volleyball Cup
(gold) (1): 2025–26

CEV Women's Champions League
(gold) (1): 2025–26

=== International ===
Turkey U17

Balkan Women's U17 Volleyball Championships
(silver) (1): 2023
CEV Women's U16 Volleyball European Championship
(silver) (1): 2023

Turkey U18

Balkan Women's U18 Volleyball Championships
(gold) (1): 2024

European Youth Olympic Festival
(gold) (1): 2025

Turkey U19

Balkan Women's U19 Volleyball Championships
(gold) (1): 2025

Turkey

Mediterranean Games
(gold) (1): 2026

=== Individual ===
Most Valuable Player (1)

2024 Women's U18 Balkan Volleyball Championships

Best Opposite Hitter (2)
2024 Women's U18 Balkan Volleyball Championships
2025 Women's U19 Balkan Volleyball Championships
