= Defne Başyolcu =

Turkish volleyball player (born 2006)

- Defne Başyolcu (2026)

Personal information
- Born: 9 August 2006 (age 20); Bursa, Turkey
- Height: 1.92 m (6 ft 3 1/2 in)
- Weight: 71 kg (157 lb)
- Spike: 316 cm (124 in)
- Block: 304 cm (120 in)

Volleyball information
- Position: Opposite/Outside Hitter
- Current club: Aras Kargo
- Number: 19

Career
Years
- 2020–2022
- 2022–2023
- 2022–2024
- 2023–2024
- 2024–2025
- 2024–2025
- 2025–
Teams
- Nilüfer Bld.
- →Beşiktaş
- Eczacıbaşı
- Istanbul BB
- Aydın BB
- →Karşıyaka
- Aras Kargo

National team
- 2022–2023
- 2025–
- 2025–
- Turkey U17
- Turkey U21
- Turkey
Honours
Women's volleyball
Representing Turkey
FIVB Nations League
Gold medal – first place	2026 Macau	Team
Mediterranean Games
Gold medal – first place	2026 Taranto	Team
Islamic Solidarity Games
Gold medal – first place	2025 Rıyadh	Team

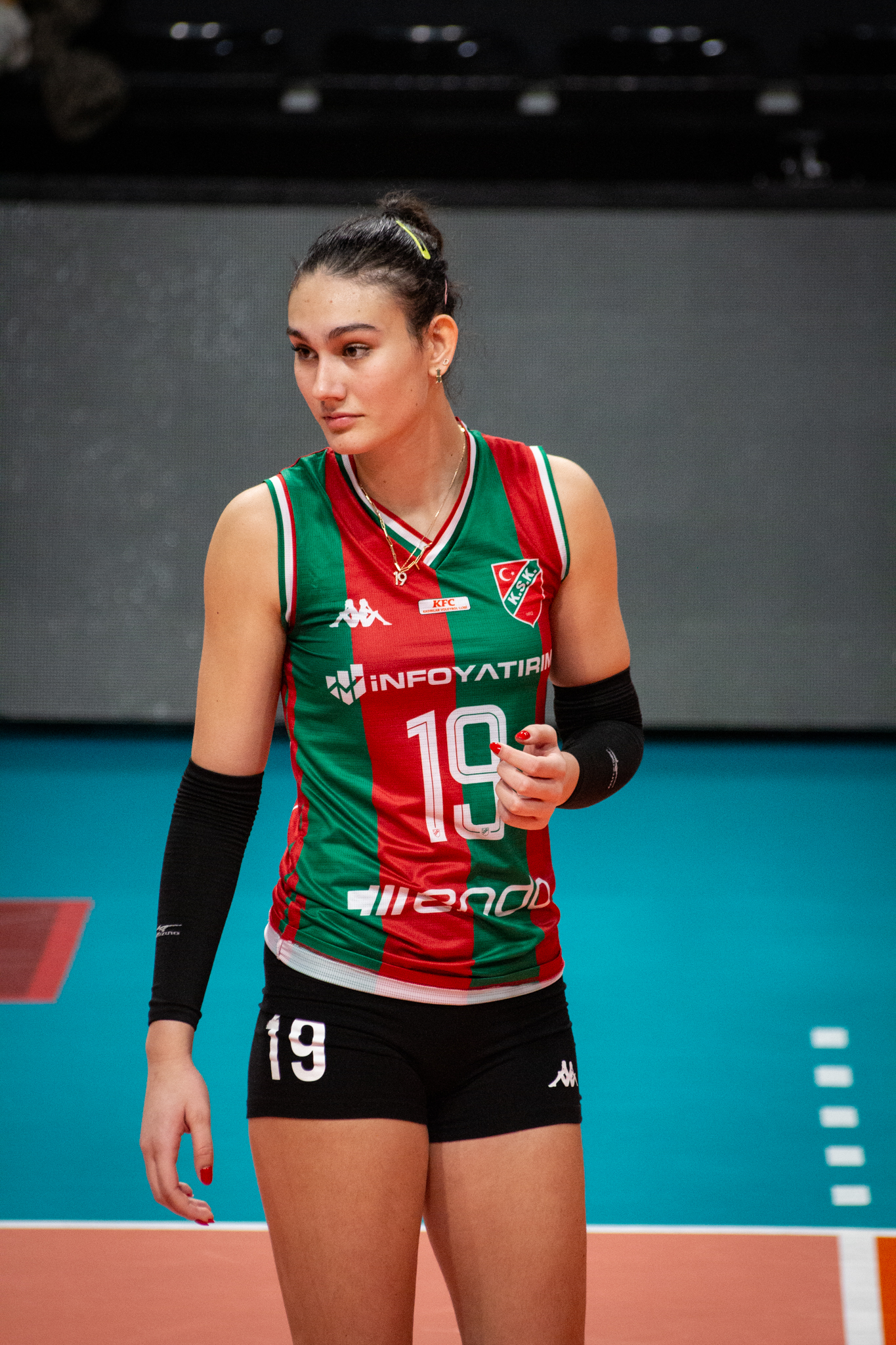
Defne Başyolcu (January 2025)

Defne Başyolcu (born 9 August 2006) is a Turkish professional volleyball player who plays as an opposite hitter for Karşıyaka.

== Personal life ==
Defne Başyolcu was born in Bursa, Turkey on 9 August 2006. Her father, Mehmet Başyolcu, was a former national volleyball player, and her mother, Nazan Uzunbay, was also a volleyball player who was with Galatasaray (1997–1999) and Bursa.

== Club career ==
Başyolcu is 1.92 m (6 ft 3 1/2 in) tall at 71 kg (157 lb). She has a spike height of 316 cm (124 in) and a block height of 304 cm (120 in).

She started her volleyball career in the academy team of Nilüfer Bld. in Bursa in 2020, where she played two seasons. In 2022, she moved to Istanbul and played for Beşiktaş on loan. She contributed to her team's league champion title and promotion to the highest-level Sultans League for the next season. She then played for Eczacıbaşı, and Istanbul BB until 2024. Later, she was with Aydın BB and Karşıyaka in İzmir. In the 2025–26 season, she plays in Aras Kargo..

== International career ==
=== Turkey U17 ===
Başyolcu was admitted to the Turkey U17 team. She won the bronze medal at the U17 Women Balkan Championship 2022 in Vranje, Serbia, and the silver medal at the 2023 Women's U17 European Volleyball Championship.

=== Turkey U21 ===
She was a member of the Turkey U21 team . She took part at the 2025 FIVB U21 World Championship Group C matches in Surabaya, Indonesia. In the game against Italy U21 team, she became top scorer with 21 points.

=== Turkey ===
Late April 2025, she was called up to the broad roster of the Turkey team for the 2025 FIVB Nations League.

She was part of the Turkey team, which became champion at the 2025 Islamic Solidarity Games in Riyadh, Saudi Arabia.

She captured gold medal at the 2026 FIVB Volleyball Nations League in Macau, China, and at the 2026 Mediterranean Games in Taranto, Italy.

== Honours ==
=== Club ===
Turkish Women's Volleyball First League

Beşiktaş
(gold) 2022–23

=== International ===
Turkey U17
(bronze) U17 Women Balkan Championship 2022
(silver) 2023 Women's U17 European Volleyball Championship

Turkey
(gold) 2025 Islamic Solidarity Games
(gold) 2026 FIVB Volleyball Nations League
(gold) 2026 Mediterranean Games
