= Emiroğlu =

Emiroğlu is a Turkish surname. Notable people with the surname include:

- İpek Emiroğlu (born 1992), Turkish football referee
- Selma Emiroğlu (1928–2011), Turkish cartoonist and opera singer
- Sema Emiroğlu (born 1967), Turkish journalist
