= İpek Soroğlu =

Turkish volleyball player

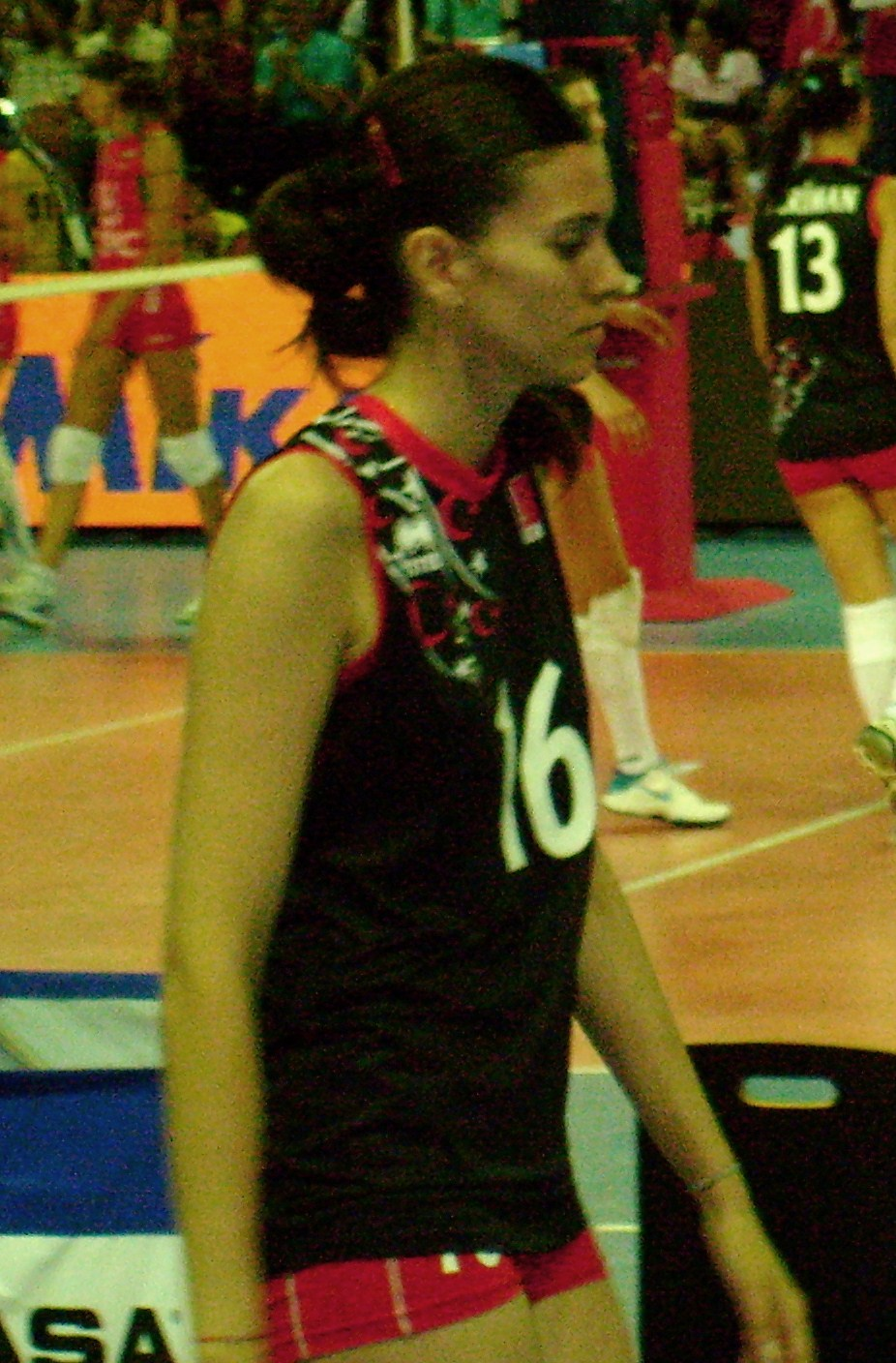
- İpek Soroğlu with the number 16 uniform of the Turkish National Team

Personal information
- Nationality: Turkish
- Born: 12 March 1985 (age 41) Istanbul, Turkey
- Home town: Istanbul, Turkey
- Height: 1.94 m (6 ft 4 in)
- Weight: 72 kg (159 lb)
- Spike: 306 cm (120 in)
- Block: 296 cm (117 in)

Volleyball information
- Position: Middle Blocker

National team
- Years: Team
- 2008 -: Turkey
Medal record
Women's volleyball
Representing Turkey
European Volleyball League
Silver medal – second place	2009 Turkey	Team
Mediterranean Games
Silver medal – second place	2009 Pescara	Team
- Updated on December 2010

İpek Soroğlu (born 12 March 1985, in Istanbul) is a former Turkish volleyball player. She is 192 cm and plays as middle blocker.

== Career ==
İpek signed a 3 years contract with Fenerbahçe Acıbadem in June 2009. She previously played for Vakıfbank Güneş Sigorta, Beşiktaş and Galatasaray.

İpek won the bronze medal at the 2010–11 CEV Champions League with Fenerbahçe Acıbadem.

Soroğlu played with Fenerbahçe in the 2012 FIVB Club World Championship held in Doha, Qatar and helped her team to win the bronze medal after defeating Puerto Rico's Lancheras de Cataño 3–0.

== Clubs ==
- (Turkey) Galatasaray (2002–2003)
- (Turkey) VakıfBank S.K. (2003–2007)
- (Turkey) Beşiktaş (2007–2009)
- (Turkey) Fenerbahçe (2009–2014)
- (Turkey) Bursa Büyükşehir Beld. (2014–2017)
- (Turkey) Çanakkale Belediyespor (2017–2018)
- (Turkey) Türk Hava Yolları (2018–2019)

== Awards ==
=== National team ===
- 2009 Mediterranean Games – Silver Medal
- 2009 European League – Silver Medal
- 2010 European League – Bronze Medal

=== Clubs ===
- 2003–04 Turkish Championship – Champion, with Güneş Sigorta
- 2003–04 Top Teams Cup – Champion, with Güneş Sigorta
- 2004–05 Turkish Championship – Champion, with Güneş Sigorta
- 2009–10 Aroma Women's Volleyball League – Champion, with Fenerbahçe Acıbadem
- 2009–10 Turkish Cup – Runner-Up, with Fenerbahçe Acıbadem
- 2010 Turkish Super Cup – Champion, with Fenerbahçe Acıbadem
- 2009–10 CEV Champions League – Runner-Up, with Fenerbahçe Acıbadem
- 2010 FIVB World Club Championship – Champion, with Fenerbahçe Acıbadem
- 2010–11 CEV Champions League – Bronze medal, with Fenerbahçe Acıbadem
- 2010–11 Aroma Women's Volleyball League – Champion, with Fenerbahçe Acıbadem
- 2011–12 CEV Champions League – Champion, with Fenerbahçe Universal
- 2012 FIVB Women's Club World Championship – Bronze Medal, with Fenerbahçe
- 2012–13 CEV Cup – Runner-Up, with Fenerbahçe
- 2013–14 CEV Cup – Champion, with Fenerbahçe
- 2016–17 CEV Women's Challenge Cup – Champion, with Bursa BB

== See also ==
- Turkish women in sports
