= Esra Gümüş =

Turkish volleyball player

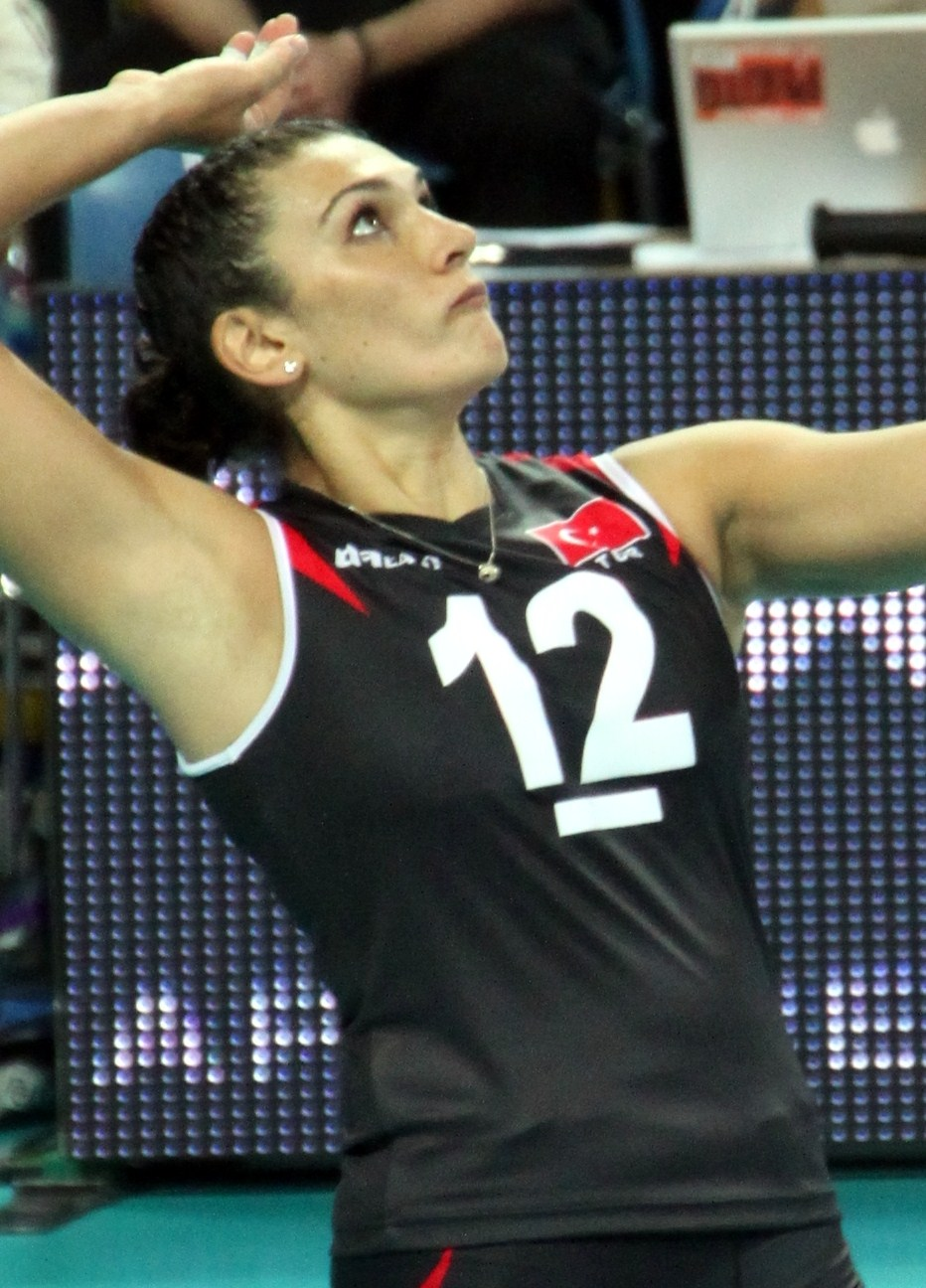

Personal information
- Full name: Esra Gümüş Kirici
- Born: 2 October 1982 (age 44); Ankara, Turkey
- Height: 1.81 m (5 ft 11 in)

Volleyball information
- Position: Middle Blocker
- Current club: Eczacıbaşı Zentiva
- Number: 12

Career
Years	Teams
1994-2000; 2000-2004; 2004-present	VakıfBank Güneş Sigorta; Yeşilyurt; Eczacıbaşı Zentiva

National team
1998-2013	Turkey
Medal record
Women's volleyball
Representing Turkey
World Grand Prix
Bronze medal – third place	2012 Ningbo	Team
European Championships
Silver medal – second place	2003 Ankara	Team
Bronze medal – third place	2011 Italy-Serbia	Team
European League
Silver medal – second place	2009 Kayseri	Team
Bronze medal – third place	2010 Ankarai	Team
Mediterranean Games
Silver medal – second place	2009 Pescara	Team
Silver medal – second place	2013 Mersin	Team

Esra Gümüş Kirici (born 2 October 1982) is a former Turkish volleyball player. She is 181 cm and plays as an outside hitter. She is a former team captain of the Turkey women's national volleyball team. She started her career with VakıfBank Istanbul in 1995 to 2000. Then she played for Yeşilyurt between 2000 and 2004. She transferred to Eczacıbaşı VitrA in 2004. She played for Sariyer Belediyesi before she quit volleyball.

== Clubs ==
- (Turkey) VakifBank Ankara (1995-2000)
- (Turkey) Yeşilyurt (2000-2004)
- (Turkey) Eczacıbaşı VitrA (2004-2015)

== Awards ==
=== Clubs ===
- 1996-97 Turkish League - Champion, with VakifBank Ankara
- 1997-98 Turkish League - Champion, with VakifBank Ankara
- 2005-06 Turkish League - Champion, with Eczacıbaşı Istanbul
- 2006-07 Turkish League - Champion, with Eczacıbaşı Istanbul
- 2007-08 Turkish League - Champion, with Eczacıbaşı Istanbul
- 2011 Turkish Volleyball Super Cup - Champion, with Eczacıbaşı VitrA
- 2011-12 Turkish Cup - Champion, with Eczacıbaşı VitrA
- 2011-12 Aroma Women's Volleyball League - Champion, with Eczacıbaşı VitrA
- 2012 Turkish Volleyball Super Cup - Champion, with Eczacıbaşı VitrA
- 2012-2013 Turkish Women's Volleyball Cup - Runner-Up, with Eczacıbaşı VitrA
- 2012-2013 Turkish Women's Volleyball League - Runner-Up, with Eczacıbaşı VitrA

=== National team ===
- 2003 European Championship - Silver Medal
- 2009 Mediterranean Games - Silver Medal
- 2009 European League - Silver Medal
- 2010 European League - Bronze Medal
- 2011 European Championship - Bronze
- 2012 FIVB World Grand Prix - Bronze Medal
- 2013 Mediterranean Games - Silver

== See also ==
- Turkish women in sports
