= Alessandro Chiappini =

Italian volleyball coach (born 1969)

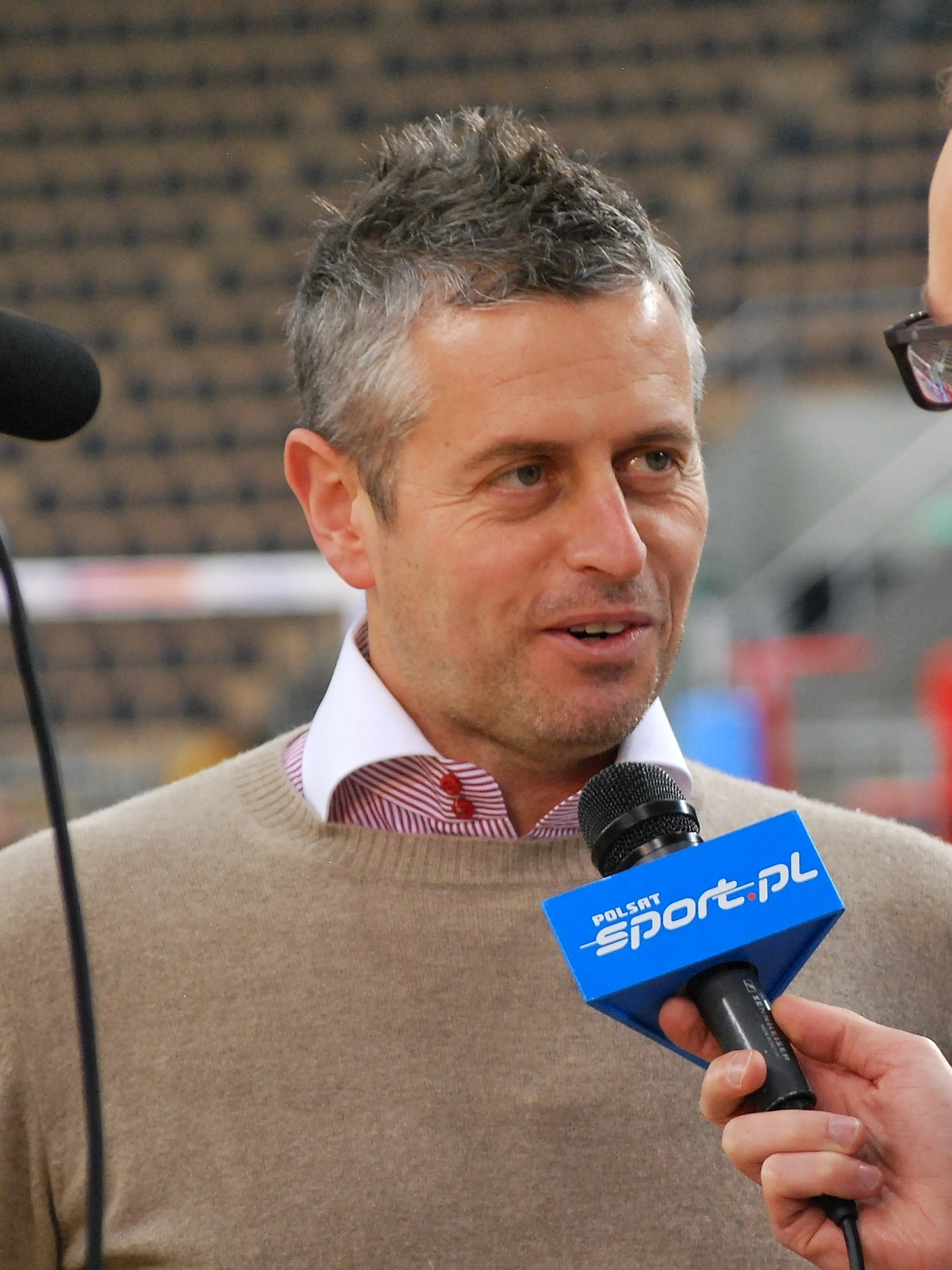

Personal information
- Nationality: (Italy)
- Born: 31 January 1969 (age 57); Perugia, Italy

Volleyball information
- Position: coach

National team
2007-2009	Turkey Women's

Alessandro Chiappini (born 31 January 1969) is an Italian volleyball coach. He was the coach of the Turkey women's national volleyball team. The team participated at the 2007 Women's European Volleyball Championship and won the silver medal at the 2009 Mediterranean Games.
