= Fatma Yıldırım =

Turkish volleyball player (born 1995)

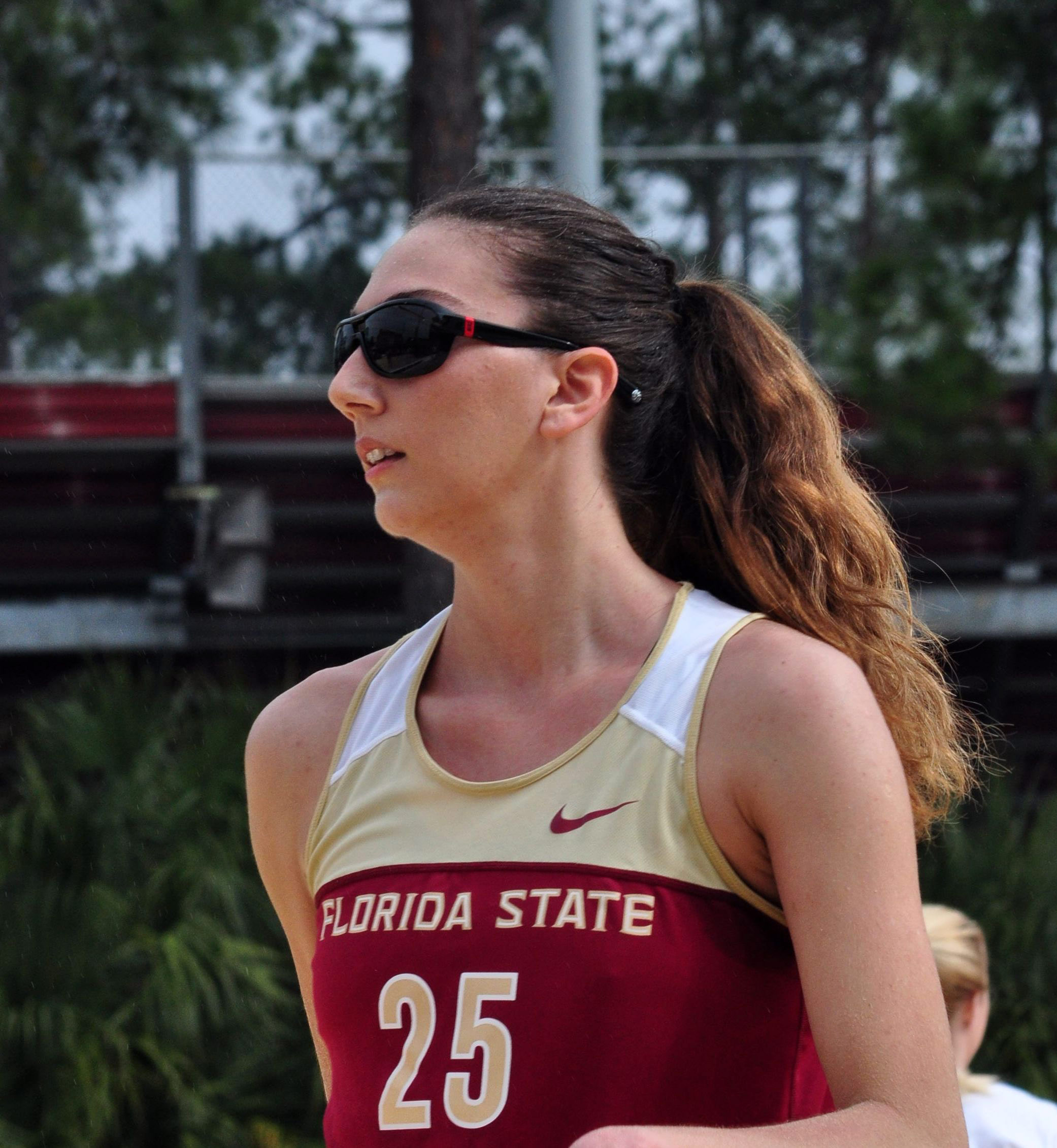

Personal information
- Born: January 3, 1990 (age 36)
- Height: 1.79 m (5 ft 10 1/2 in)
- Weight: 65 kg (143 lb)
- Spike: 285 cm (112 in)
- Block: 275 cm (108 in)
- Education: Florida State University

Volleyball information
- Number: 19

National team
Turkey women's national volleyball team
Honours
Women's volleyball

Fatma Yıldırım (born 3 January 1990) is a Turkish volleyball player.

She participated at the 2016 FIVB Volleyball World Grand Prix, and 2017 FIVB Volleyball World Grand Prix.

== Career ==
She played for the Florida State University.

== Clubs ==
Club	From	To
Turkey Eczacıbaşı İstanbul	2000-2001	2008-2009
United States Florida State University	2009-2010	2013-2014
Turkey Halkbank Ankara	2014-2015	2015-2016
Turkey Bursa BBSK	2016-2017	…
