= Asuman Karakoyun =

Turkish volleyball player

Personal information
- Full name: Asuman Karakoyun
- Born: 16 July 1990 (age 36) Istanbul, Turkey
- Height: 1.80 m (5 ft 11 in)
- Weight: 72 kg (159 lb)
- Spike: 290
- Block: 280

Volleyball information
- Position: Team Manager
- Current club: Türk Hava Yolları

Career
- Years: Team
- 2004–2016: Eczacıbaşı VitrA

National team
- Years: Team
- 2009–2015: Turkey

Asuman Karakoyun (born 16 July 1990) is a retired Turkish volleyball player. She is 180 cm (5.9 ft) tall and played as a Setter. She played for Eczacıbaşı VitrA and wore the number 8. On 23 August 2016, she announced her retirement at the age of 26 after more than one year's absence from the sport due to knee injury.

== Clubs ==
- (Turkey) Eczacıbaşı VitrA (2004–2016)

== Awards ==
=== Individuals ===
- 2012–13 Turkish League Final Series "Best Server"

=== Club ===
- 2011 Turkish Super Cup – Champion, with Eczacıbaşı VitrA
- 2011–12 Turkish Women's Volleyball Cup – Champion, with Eczacıbaşı VitrA
- 2011–12 Aroma Women's Volleyball League – Champion, with Eczacıbaşı VitrA
- 2012 Turkish Volleyball Super Cup – Champion, with Eczacıbaşı VitrA
- 2012–2013 Turkish Women's Volleyball Cup – Runner-Up, with Eczacıbaşı VitrA
- 2012–2013 Turkish Women's Volleyball League – Runner-Up, with Eczacıbaşı VitrA

== See also ==
- Turkish women in sports
