= Aysun Özbek =

Turkish volleyball player (born 1977)

Personal information
- Full name: Aysun Özbek
- Nationality: Turkish
- Born: March 18, 1977 (age 49); Istanbul, Turkey
- Height: 1.85 m (6 ft 1 in)
- Weight: 73 kg (161 lb)
- Spike: 305 cm (120 in)
- Block: 300 cm (118 in)

Volleyball information
- Position: Middle Blocker
- Number: 5

National team
1997-2007	Turkey
Medal record
Women's volleyball
Representing Turkey
European Championships
Silver medal – second place	2003 Turkey	Team
Mediterranean Games
Gold medal – first place	2005 Almeria	Team
Silver medal – second place	1997 Bari	Team
Silver medal – second place	2001 Tunis	Team

Aysun Özbek (born March 18, 1977) is a Turkish retired volleyball player. She is 185 cm tall and weighs 73 kg. Playing in the middle blocker position, she played for Vakıfbank Güneş Sigorta since 1996. She wore the number 5 jersey and was the team's captain.

Özbek also played in over 200 games for the national team. She started her professional career with Fenerbahçe and played there for 6 years.

== Clubs ==
- (Turkey) Fenerbahçe Istanbul (1990–1996)
- (Turkey) VakifBank Ankara (1996–2000)
- (Turkey) VakıfBank Güneş Sigorta Istanbul (2000–2008)
- (Turkey) Eczacıbaşı VitrA (2009–2011)

== Awards ==
=== Individuals ===
- 2003–2004 CEV Top Teams Cup Final Four "Best Blocker"
- 2005–2006 CEV Champions League "Best Blocker"
- 2007–2008 CEV Challenge Cup "Most Valuable Player"

=== National team ===
- 1997 Mediterranean Games – Silver Medal
- 2001 Mediterranean Games – Silver Medal
- 2003 European Championship – Silver Medal
- 2005 Mediterranean Games – Gold Medal

=== Clubs ===
- 1996–1997 Turkish Cup – Champion, with VakıfBank Ankara
- 1996–1997 Turkish League – Champion, with VakıfBank Ankara
- 1997–1998 Turkish Cup – Champion, with VakıfBank Ankara
- 1997–1998 Turkish League – Champion, with VakıfBank Ankara
- 1997–1998 CEV Champions League – Runner-up, with VakıfBank Ankara
- 1998–1999 CEV Champions League – Runner-up, with VakıfBank Ankara
- 2000–2001 Turkish League – Runner-up, with VakıfBank Güneş Sigorta
- 2001–2002 Turkish League – Runner-up, with VakıfBank Güneş Sigorta
- 2002–2003 Turkish League – Runner-up, with VakıfBank Güneş Sigorta
- 2003–2004 Turkish League – Champion, with VakıfBank Güneş Sigorta
- 2003–2004 CEV Top Teams Cup – Champion, with VakıfBank Güneş Sigorta
- 2004–2005 Turkish League – Champion, with VakıfBank Güneş Sigorta
- 2005–2006 Turkish League – Runner-up, with VakıfBank Güneş Sigorta
- 2007–2008 CEV Challenge Cup – Champion, with VakıfBank Güneş Sigorta
- 2010–2011 Turkish Cup – Champion, with Eczacıbaşı VitrA

== See also ==
- Turkish women in sports
