= Deniz Hakyemez =

Turkish volleyball player (born 1983)

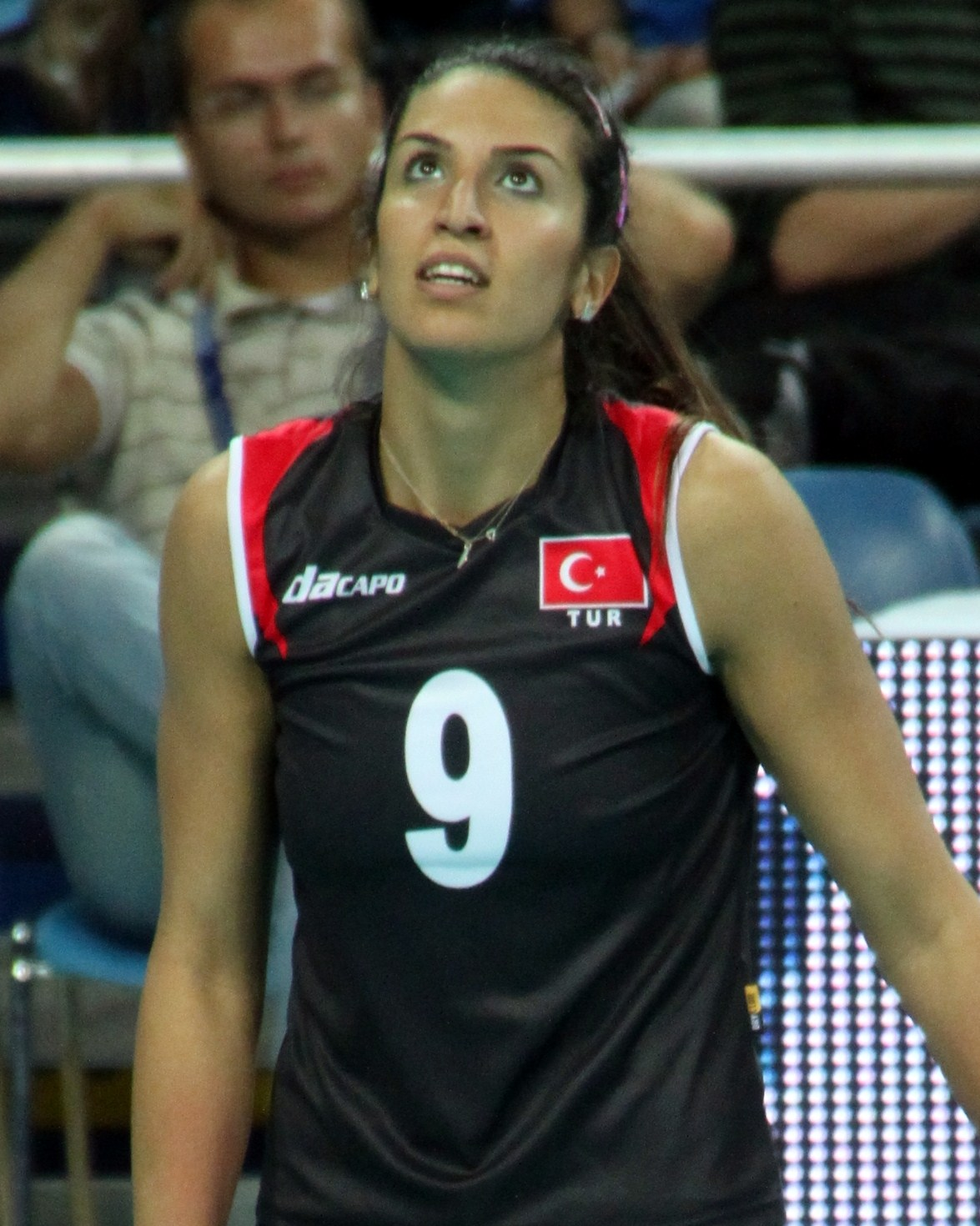

Personal information
- Full name: Deniz Hakyemez Çetin Saraç
- Nationality: Turkey
- Born: 3 February 1983 (age 43); Istanbul, Turkey
- Hometown: Istanbul, Turkey
- Height: 1.88 m (6 ft 2 in)
- Weight: 72 kg (159 lb)
- Spike: 300 cm (118 in)
- Block: 295 cm (116 in)

Volleyball information
- Position: Outside hitter

Career
Years	Teams
1998-2003; 2003-2005; 2005-2009; 2009-2013; 2013-2014; 2014-2016; 2016-2017; 2017-2018; 2018-2019; 2019-2020; 2020-2021	Eczacıbaşı; Beşiktaş; VakıfBank Güneş Sigorta; Galatasaray Medical Park; Salihli Belediyespor; Bolu Belediyespor; Samsun Anakentspor; Arkas Spor; Küçükyali Yelken Spor; Nevşehir Bld.spor; Beşiktaş

National team
2005-present	Turkey
Medal record
Women's volleyball
Representing Turkey
Mediterranean Games
Gold medal – first place	2005 Almeria	Team
Silver medal – second place	2009 Pescara	Team
- Last updated: 4 June 2010

Deniz Hakyemez Çetin Saraç (born 3 February 1983) is a Turkish volleyball player who has represented the national team. She is 1.88 m (6 ft 2 in) tall and plays as an outside hitter. She studied at Marmara University.

Hakyemez plays for Galatasaray Medical Park. She signed 1-year contract with the team in July 2009.

== Awards ==
=== Club ===
- 2011-12 Turkish Cup – Runner-up, with Galatasaray Daikin
- 2011-12 CEV Cup – Runner-up, with Galatasaray Daikin

== See also ==
- Turkish women in sports
