= Yaprak Erkek =

Turkish volleyball player (born 2001)

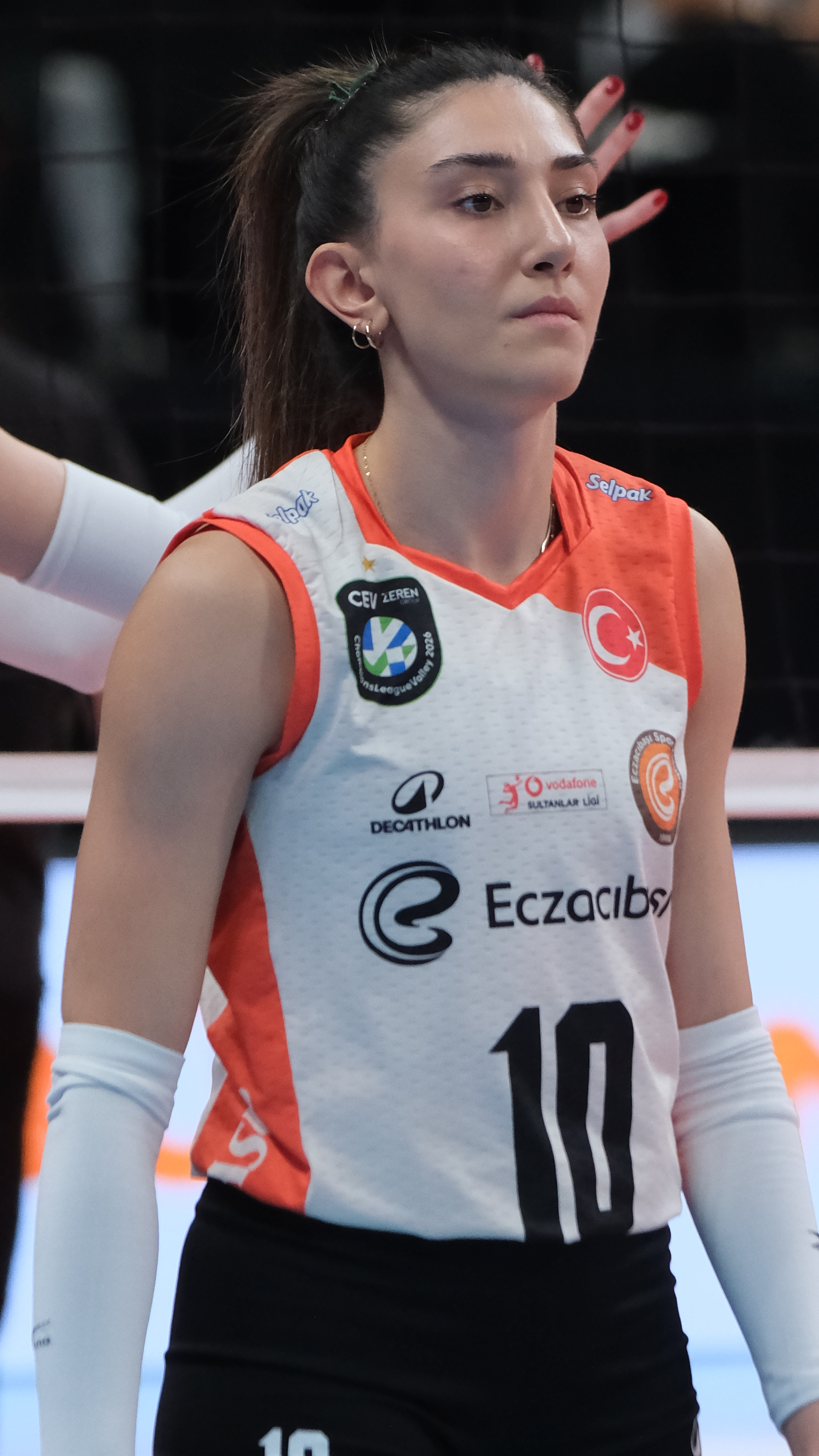
- Erkek in 2025

Personal information
- Born: 2 September 2001 (age 25) Turkey
- Height: 1.82 m (5 ft 11 1/2 in)
- Spike: 300 cm (120 in)
- Block: 295 cm (116 in)

Volleyball information
- Position: Outside hitter
- Current club: (Turkey) Eczacıbaşı
- Number: 10

Career
- Years: Team
- 2017–2021: (Turkey) İlbank
- 2021–2022: (Poland) Legionovia Legionowo
- 2022–: (Turkey) Eczacıbaşı

National team
- Years: Team
- 2022–: Turkey
Honours
Women's volleyball
Representing Turkey
FIVB World Championship
Silver medal – second place	2025 Thailand	Team
FIVB Nations League
Gold medal – first place	2026 Macau	Team
European Championship
Gold medal – first place	2026 Azerbaijan/Czech Republic/Sweden/Turkey	Team
Mediterranean Games
Silver medal – second place	2022 Oran	Team
Islamic Solidarity Games
Gold medal – first place	2021 Konya	Team

Yaprak Erkek (born 2 September 2001) is a Turkish professional volleyball player. She plays in the outside hitter position. Currently, she plays for Eczacıbaşı and is a member of the Turkey women's national volleyball team.

== Club career ==
She is 1.82 m (5 ft 11 1/2 in) tall, and plays in the oıtside hitter position. She has a spke height of 300 cm (120 in) and a block height of 295 cm (116 in).

Erkek started her career in the Academy team of İlbank in Ankara in 2017. Promoted to the main team, she played in the Turkish League until 2021. She then moved to Poland, and signed a deal with Legionovia Legionowo for the 2021–22 season. After one year, she returned home, and joined Eczacıbaşı.

== International career ==
Erkek is a member of the Turkey women's national volleyball team.

In 2022, she won the gold medal at the 2021 Islamic Solidarity Games held in Konya, Turkey. The same year, she took the silver medal at the 2022 Mediterranean Games in Oran, Algeria.

She plays at the 2025 FIVB Women's Volleyball Nations League.

== Honours ==
=== International ===
Islamic Solidarity Games
Gold medal (1) 2021

Mediterranean Games
Silver medal (1): 2022
