= Volleyball at the 2009 Mediterranean Games – Women's tournament =

Women's Volleyball at the 2009 Mediterranean Games
- Dates: 28 June–4 July 2009

Medalists
gold medal	Italy
silver medal	Turkey
bronze medal	Croatia

The women's volleyball tournament at the 2009 Mediterranean Games was held in Vasto.

== Teams ==
Group A

- Albania
- Bosnia and Herzegovina
- Greece
- Turkey

Group B

- Algeria
- Croatia
- France
- Italy

== Preliminary round ==
=== Group A ===
	Team	Points	G	W	L	PW	PL	Ratio	SW	SL	Ratio
1.	Turkey	6	3	3	0	225	145	1.552	9	0	MAX
2.	Greece	5	3	2	1	235	210	1.119	6	4	1.500
3.	Bosnia and Herzegovina	4	3	1	2	224	269	0.833	4	8	0.500
4.	Albania	3	3	0	3	194	254	0.764	2	9	0.222

- June 28, 2009

Bosnia and Herzegovina	3 – 2	Albania	25–15, 18–25, 25–19, 21–25, 15–11

Turkey	3 – 0	Greece	25–17, 25–21, 25–23

- June 29, 2009

Greece	3 – 1	Bosnia and Herzegovina	25–23, 25–16, 24–26, 25–14

Turkey	3 – 0	Albania	25–17, 25–12, 25–14

- June 30, 2009

Greece	3 – 0	Albania	25–16, 25–20, 25–20

Turkey	3 – 0	Bosnia and Herzegovina	25–17, 25–10, 25–14

=== Group B ===
	Team	Points	G	W	L	PW	PL	Ratio	SW	SL	Ratio
1.	Italy	6	3	3	0	225	150	1.500	9	0	MAX
2.	Croatia	5	3	2	1	232	192	1.208	6	4	1.500
3.	France	4	3	1	2	191	224	0.853	4	6	0.667
4.	Algeria	3	3	0	3	143	225	0.636	0	9	0.000

- June 28, 2009

Italy	3 – 0	Algeria	25–15, 25–14, 25–17

Croatia	3 – 1	France	25–16, 24–26, 25–16, 25–12

- June 29, 2009

Croatia	3 – 0	Algeria	25–16, 25–16, 25–15

Italy	3 – 0	France	25–10, 25–18, 25–18

- June 30, 2009

Italy	3 – 0	Croatia	25–21, 25–19, 25–18

France	3 – 0	Algeria	25–18, 25–18, 25–14

=== Final round ===
Semi-finals
Croatia	1
Turkey	3
Greece	1
Italy	3

Final
Italy	3
Turkey	2
Third place
Croatia	3
Greece	0

==== Semi finals ====
- July 2, 2009

Turkey	3 – 1	Croatia	27–29, 25–15, 25–22, 25–17
Italy	3 – 1	Greece	21–25, 25–21, 25–21, 25–18

==== Finals ====
- July 1, 2009 — Classification Match (7th/8th place)

Algeria	3 – 2	Albania	30–28, 18–25, 25–23, 19–25, 15–9

- July 1, 2009 — Classification Match (5th/6th place)

Bosnia and Herzegovina	3 – 0	France	25–21, 27–25, 25–21

- July 4, 2009 — Classification Match (Bronze-medal match)

Croatia	3 – 0	Greece	25–14, 25–21, 25–18

- July 4, 2009 — Classification Match (Gold-medal match)

Italy	3 – 2	Turkey	25–17, 20–25, 18–25, 25–19, 15–10

=== Final ranking ===
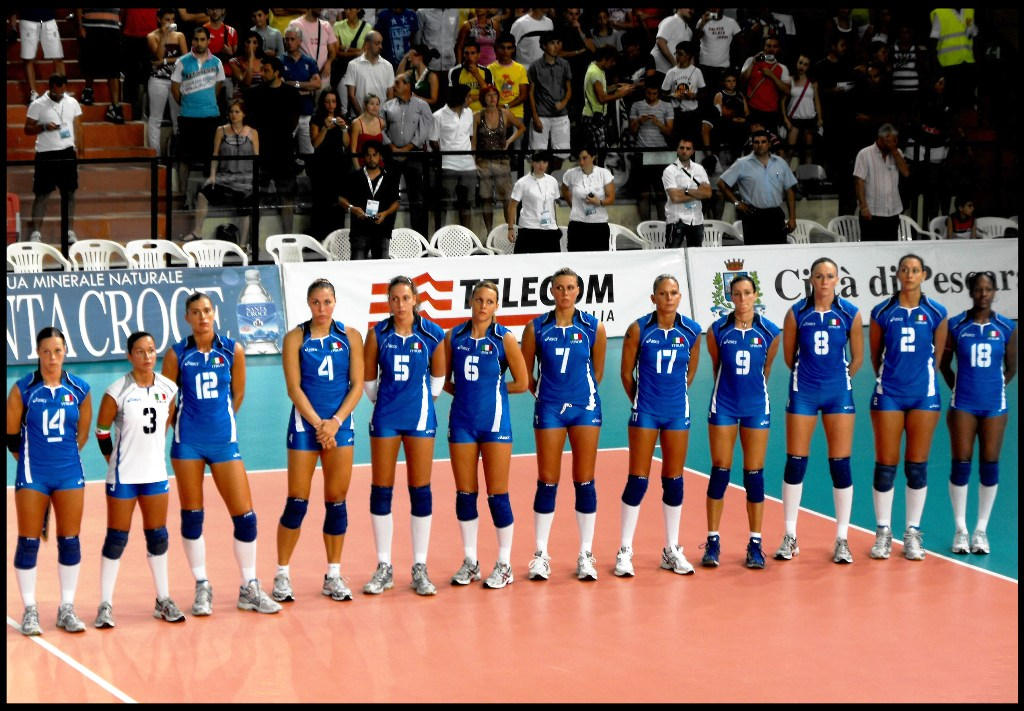
The champion Italian team

RANK	TEAM
	Italy
	Turkey
	Croatia
4.	Greece
5.	Bosnia and Herzegovina
6.	France
7.	Algeria
8.	Albania

=== Awards ===
2009 Women's Mediterranean Games champions

Italy
