= Turkey women's national volleyball team =

Women's national volleyball team representing Türkiye

Turkey
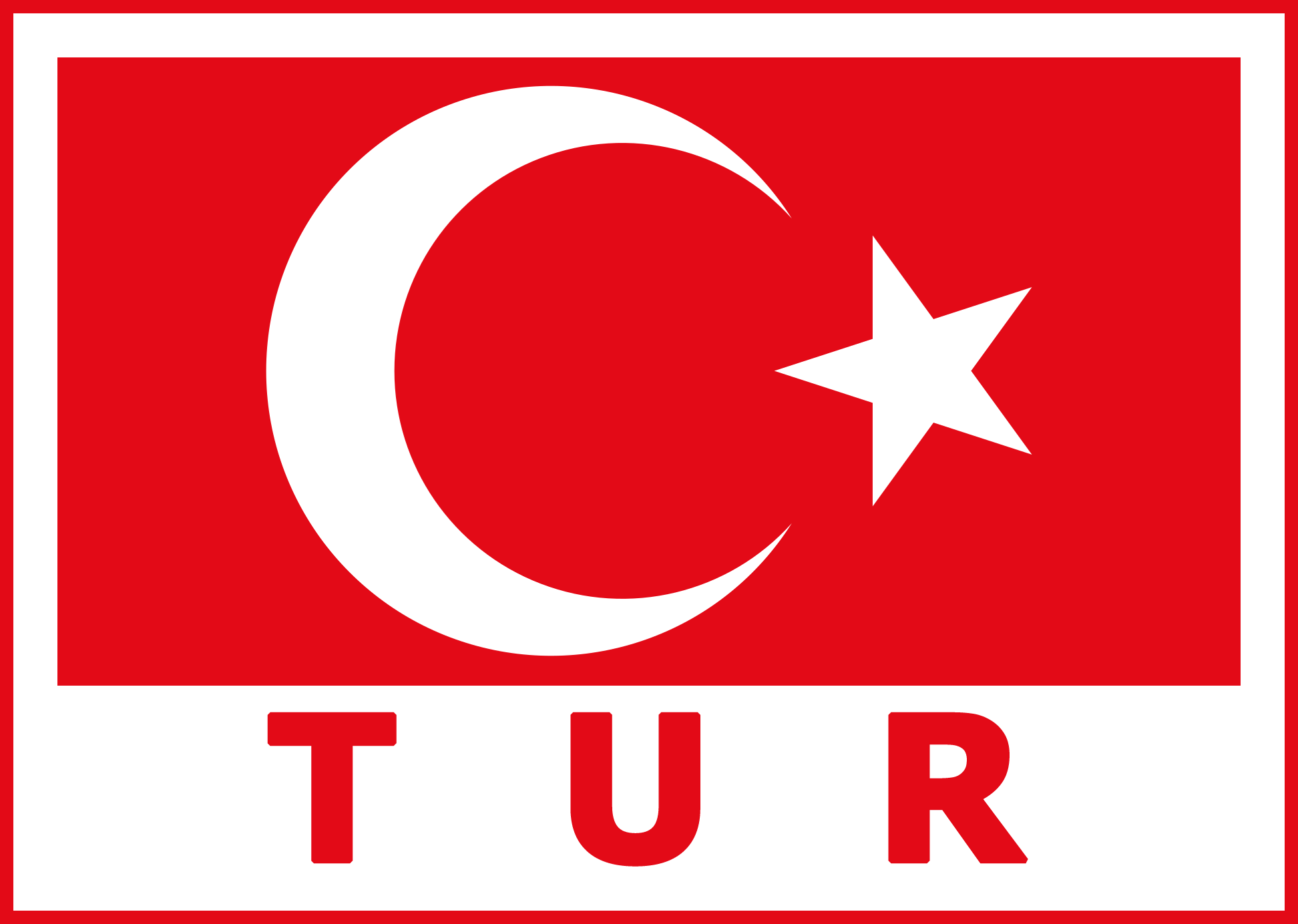
- Nickname(s): Filenin Sultanları; (Sultans of the Net)
- Association: Turkish Volleyball Federation
- Confederation: CEV
- Head coach: Daniele Santarelli
- FIVB ranking: 3 (2 October 2026)

Uniforms
Home	Away	Third

Summer Olympics
- Appearances: 3 (First in 2012)
- Best result: 4th place (2024)

World Championship
- Appearances: 6 (First in 2006)
- Best result: (2025)

World Cup
- Appearances: 2 (First in 2003)
- Best result: (2023)

European Championship
- Appearances: 17 (First in 1963)
- Best result: (2023, 2026)
- tvf.org.tr
Honours
Event	1st	2nd	3rd
Summer Olympics	0	0	0
World Championship	0	1	0
World Cup	1	0	0
World Grand Prix	0	0	1
Nations League	2	1	1
European Championship	2	2	3
European Games	1	0	0
European League	1	3	1
Mediterranean Games	2	7	3
Islamic Solidarity Games	2	1	0
Total	11	15	9
Medal record
World Championship
Silver medal – second place	2025 Thailand	Team
World Cup
Gold medal – first place	2023 Japan	Team
Nations League
Gold medal – first place	2023 Arlington	Team
Gold medal – first place	2026 Macau	Team
Silver medal – second place	2018 Nanjing	Team
Bronze medal – third place	2021 Rimini	Team
World Grand Prix
Bronze medal – third place	2012 Ningbo	Team
European Championship
Gold medal – first place	2023 Belgium-Estonia-Germany-Italy	
Gold medal – first place	2026 Azerbaijan-Czechia-Sweden-Turkey	
Silver medal – second place	2003 Turkey	
Silver medal – second place	2019 Slovakia-Hungary-Poland-Turkey	
Bronze medal – third place	2011 Serbia-Italy	
Bronze medal – third place	2017 Azerbaijan-Georgia	
Bronze medal – third place	2021 Serbia-Bulgaria-Croatia-Romania	
European Games
Gold medal – first place	2015 Azerbaijan	Team
European League
Gold medal – first place	2014 Rüsselsheim	
Silver medal – second place	2009 Kayseri	
Silver medal – second place	2011 Istanbul	
Silver medal – second place	2015 No Host	
Bronze medal – third place	2010 Ankara	
Montreux Volley Masters
Gold medal – first place	2015 Montreux	
Bronze medal – third place	2016 Montreux	
Bronze medal – third place	2018 Montreux	
Mediterranean Games
Gold medal – first place	2005 Spain	Team
Gold medal – first place	2026 Italy	Team
Silver medal – second place	1987 Syria	Team
Silver medal – second place	1991 Greece	Team
Silver medal – second place	1997 Italy	Team
Silver medal – second place	2001 Tunisia	Team
Silver medal – second place	2009 Italy	Team
Silver medal – second place	2013 Turkey	Team
Silver medal – second place	2022 Algeria	Team
Bronze medal – third place	1975 Algeria	Team
Bronze medal – third place	1993 France	Team
Bronze medal – third place	2018 Spain	Team
Islamic Solidarity Games
Gold medal – first place	2021 Konya	Team
Gold medal – first place	2025 Riyadh	Team
Silver medal – second place	2017 Baku	Team

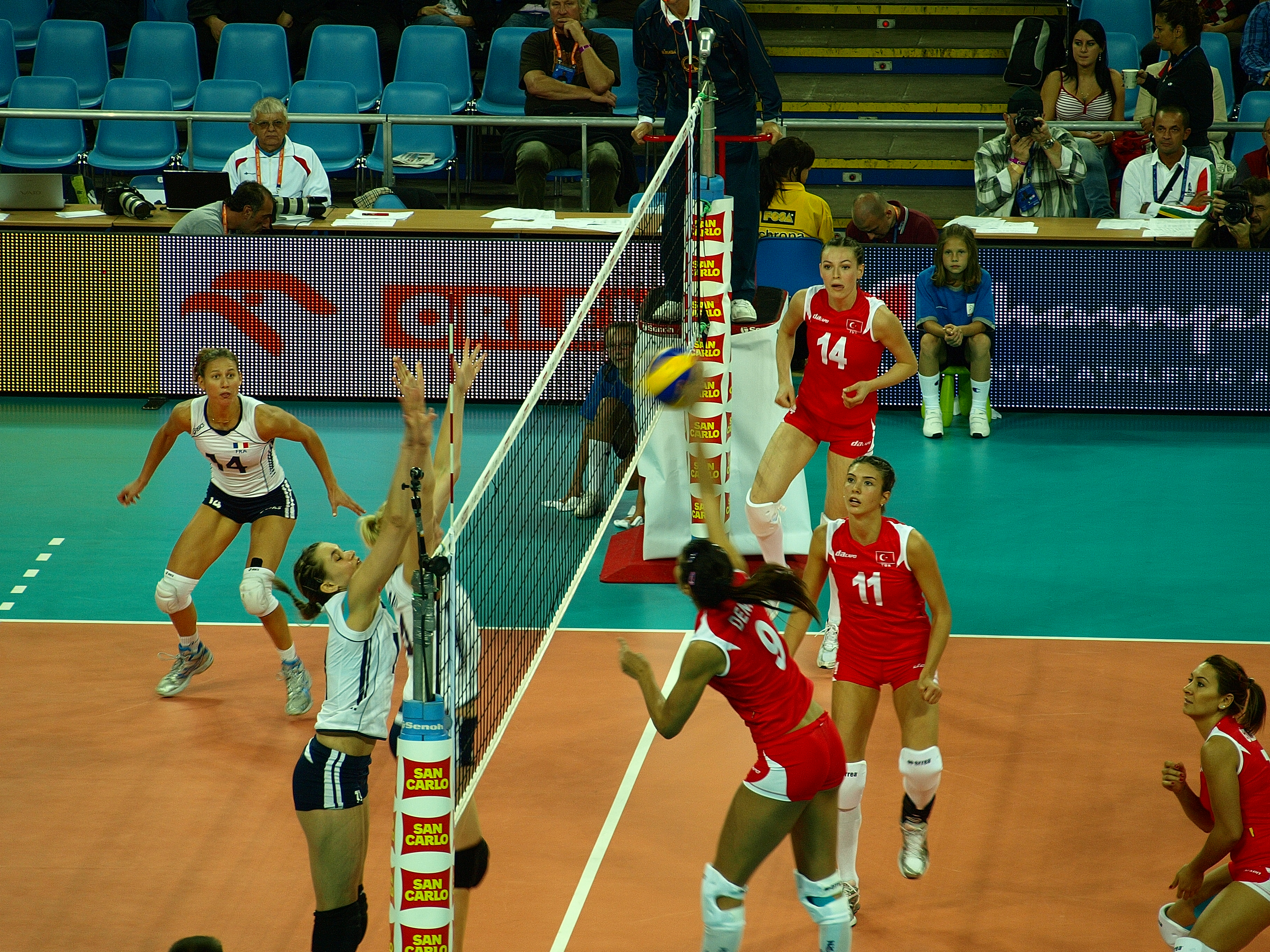
Türkiye against France during the 2009 European Championship in Poland.

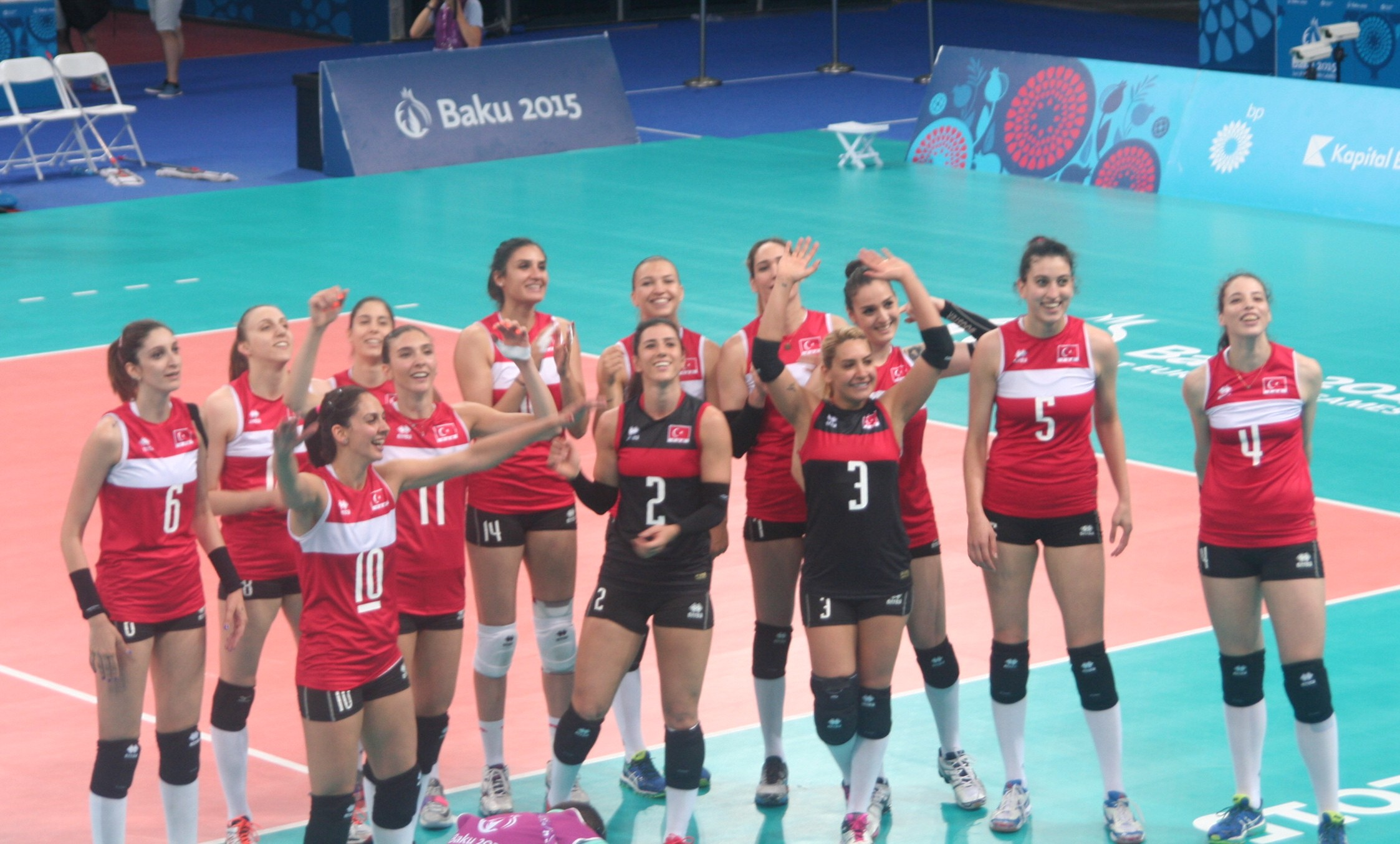
Türkiye won the European Games in 2015.

The Türkiye women's national volleyball team (Turkish: Türkiye kadın millî voleybol takımı) is governed by the Turkish Volleyball Federation (TVF) and represents Türkiye in international volleyball competitions.

The Türkiye women’s national volleyball team won consecutive CEV European Championship titles in 2023 and 2026, its first two European titles. It has also won the FIVB Volleyball Nations League twice, in 2023 and 2026. At the 2024 Summer Olympics, the team reached the semi-finals for the first time and finished fourth, while at the 2025 FIVB Women’s Volleyball World Championship, it reached the final for the first time and won the silver medal.

The team has been nicknamed “Filenin Sultanları” (English: Sultans of the Net) since the 2003 Women’s European Volleyball Championship, which was hosted in Ankara, Türkiye. As of 2 October 2026, Türkiye is ranked third in the FIVB World Rankings. Daniele Santarelli is the head coach of the team.

== History ==
=== Early years ===
Volleyball was introduced to Türkiye in the 1910s. Sabiha Gürayman was among the first Turkish women to play volleyball and later founded and played for the Fenerbahçe women’s volleyball team, having previously played for the club’s men’s team.

The Türkiye women’s national team played its first international match in 1957 at the International Istanbul Tournament against Romania. Its first international victory came on 22 July 1961, when it defeated West Germany 3–2. Türkiye made its European Championship debut in 1963 in Romania, finishing 10th. In 1967, Türkiye hosted the European Championship for the first time and finished 12th.

=== 2000s ===
The 2003 European Championship, hosted in Ankara, was the team’s first appearance in a European Championship final. Türkiye won the silver medal, finishing as runners-up to Poland. It was the team’s first major international success.

=== 2010s ===
During the 2010s, Türkiye achieved several podium finishes in major international competitions, while Turkish clubs also became increasingly successful in European competitions.

Türkiye won bronze at the 2011 European Championship. In 2012, the team qualified for the Olympic Games for the first time and finished ninth in London. Türkiye won another bronze medal at the 2017 European Championship and reached the final of the inaugural FIVB Volleyball Nations League in 2018, winning silver. In 2019, Türkiye reached the European Championship final for the second time and won silver, finishing as runners-up to Serbia.

=== 2020s ===
Türkiye made its second Olympic appearance at the 2020 Summer Olympics in Tokyo, reaching the quarter-finals and finishing fifth. In 2021, the team won bronze at the European Championship.

In 2023, Türkiye won its first FIVB Volleyball Nations League title and its first CEV European Championship title. The team also qualified for the 2024 Summer Olympics during the 2023 season. Between 29 June and 24 September, Türkiye won 22 consecutive matches across the Volleyball Nations League, the European Championship and the Olympic qualification tournament.

At the 2024 Summer Olympics in Paris, Türkiye reached the semi-finals for the first time and finished fourth.

In 2025, Türkiye reached the FIVB Women’s Volleyball World Championship final for the first time and won the silver medal, its first World Championship medal.

In 2026, Türkiye won its second FIVB Volleyball Nations League title and retained the European Championship title. In the European Championship final in Istanbul, Türkiye defeated Italy 3–2. The title also secured direct qualification for the 2028 Summer Olympics. Türkiye will make its fourth Olympic appearance in 2028, following its participation in 2012, 2020 and 2024.

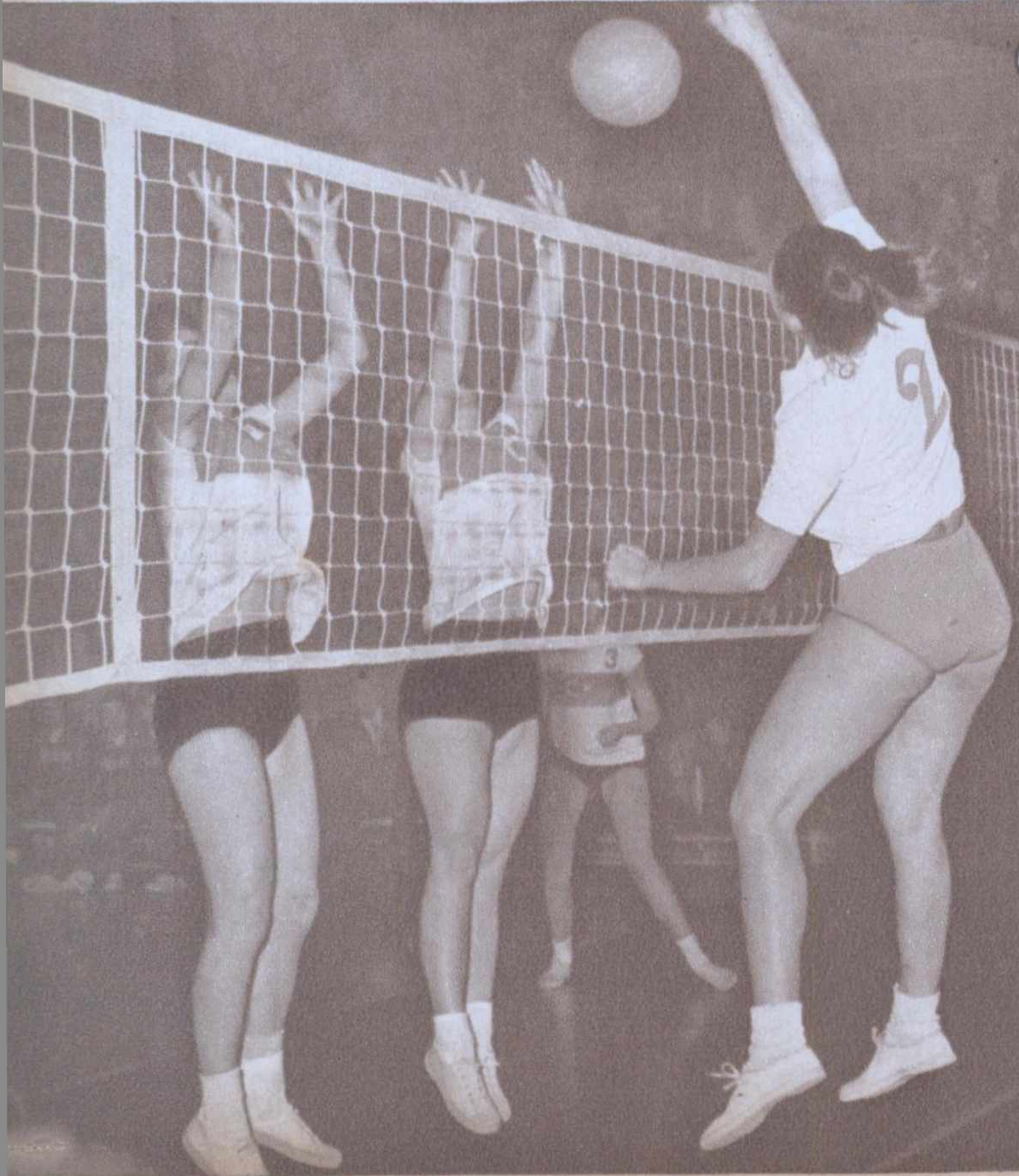
Türkiye against Bulgaria during their debut at the European Championship in 1963.

== Achievements ==
=== Summer Olympics ===
Champions Runners-up Third place Fourth place

Summer Olympics record
Year	Round	Position	Pld	W	L	SW	SL	Squad
(Japan) 1964	did not qualify							
(Mexico) 1968	did not qualify							
(West Germany) 1972	did not qualify							
(Canada) 1976	did not qualify							
(Soviet Union) 1980	did not qualify							
(United States) 1984	did not qualify							
(South Korea) 1988	did not qualify							
(Spain) 1992	did not qualify							
(United States) 1996	did not qualify							
(Australia) 2000	did not qualify							
(Greece) 2004	did not qualify							
(China) 2008	did not qualify							
(United Kingdom) 2012	Preliminary round	9th place	5	2	3	9	11	Squad
(Brazil) 2016	did not qualify							
(Japan) 2020	Quarterfinals	5th place	6	3	3	14	11	Squad
(France) 2024	Semifinals	Fourth place	6	3	3	10	14	Squad
(United States) 2028	qualified							
(Australia) 2032	future event							
Total	0 Titles	4/18	17	8	9	33	36	

=== World Championship ===
Champions Runners up Third place Fourth place

World Championship record
Year	Round	Position	Pld	W	L	SW	SL	Squad
(Japan) 2006	9th–12th places	10th Place	11	5	6	17	22	Squad
(Japan) 2010	5th–8th places	6th Place	11	6	5	23	22	Squad
(Italy) 2014	Second round	9th Place	9	5	4	21	15	Squad
(Japan) 2018	Second round	10th Place	9	5	4	15	15	Squad
(Netherlands) (Poland) 2022	Quarterfinals	8th place	10	6	4	21	16	Squad
(Thailand) 2025	Final	Runners-up	7	6	1	20	5	Squad
(United States) (Canada) 2027	qualified							
(Philippines) 2029	future event							
Total	0 Titles	7/22	57	33	24	117	95	

=== FIVB World Cup ===
Champions Runners-up Third place Fourth place

Year	Position	W	L
(Japan) 2003	7th	5	6
(Japan) 2023	Champions	7	0
Total	1 Titles		

=== World Grand Prix ===
Champions Runners-up Third place Fourth place

Year	Position	W	L
(Japan) 2008	7th	4	5
(China) 2012	Third place	10	4
(Japan) 2013	8th	6	3
(Japan) 2014	Fourth place	8	6
(United States) 2015	11th	2	7
(Thailand) 2016	10th	3	6
(China) 2017	11th	2	7
Total	7/25	35	38

=== Nations League ===
Champions Runners-up Third place Fourth place

Year	Round	Position	Pld	W	L	SW	SL	Squad
(China) 2018	Final	Runners-up	15	10	5	35	23	Squad
(China) 2019	Semifinals	Fourth place	19	13	6	43	25	Squad
(Italy) 2021	Semifinals	Third place	17	12	5	40	24	Squad
(Turkey) 2022	Semifinals	Fourth place	15	8	7	31	25	Squad
(United States) 2023	Final	Champions	15	12	3	40	13	Squad
(Thailand) 2024	Quarterfinals	6th	13	8	5	31	21	Squad
(Poland) 2025	Quarterfinals	6th	13	8	5	30	20	Squad
(Macau) 2026	Final	Champions	15	12	3	39	21	Squad
(N/A) 2027	qualified							
Total	2 Titles	9/9	122	83	39	289	172	

=== European Championship ===
Champions Runners-up Third place Fourth place

Year	Round	Position	Pld	W	L	SW	SL
(Romania) 1963	Round Robin	10th	6	3	3	9	10
(Turkey) 1967	Round Robin	12th	8	3	5	16	19
(Bulgaria) 1981	Final Round	12th	8	0	8	1	23
(West Germany) 1989	Final Round	11th	7	2	5	8	17
(Netherlands) 1995	Preliminary Round	12th	5	0	5	2	15
(Turkey) 2003	Final	Runners-up	7	5	2	17	6
(Croatia) 2005	Final Round	6th	7	3	4	11	12
(Belgium) (Luxembourg) 2007	Playoff Round	10th	6	2	4	6	20
(Poland) 2009	Playoff Round	5th	6	4	2	14	8
(Italy) (Serbia) 2011	Semifinals	Third place	7	5	2	17	11
(Germany) 2013	Quarter Final	7th	5	3	2	9	8
(Netherlands) (Belgium) 2015	Semifinals	Fourth place	6	4	2	12	8
(Azerbaijan) (Georgia (country)) 2017	Semifinals	Third place	7	4	3	15	12
(Slovakia) (Hungary) (Poland) (Turkey) 2019	Final	Runners-up	9	7	2	24	12
(Serbia) (Bulgaria) (Croatia) (Romania) 2021	Semifinals	Third place	9	8	1	25	5
(Belgium) (Italy) (Germany) (Estonia) 2023	Final	Champions	9	9	0	27	6
(Azerbaijan) (Czech Republic) (Sweden) (Turkey) 2026	Final	Champions	9	8	1	24	8
(Slovakia) (Spain) (N/A) (N/A) 2028	qualified						
Total	2 Titles	18/35	121	70	51	237	200

=== European Games ===
Champions Runners-up Third place Fourth place

Year	Position	W	L
(Azerbaijan) 2015	1st place, gold medalist(s)	7	1
Total	1/1	7	1

=== European League ===
Champions Runners-up Third place Fourth place

Year	Position	W	L
(Turkey) 2009	2nd place, silver medalist(s)	11	3
(Turkey) 2010	3rd place, bronze medalist(s)	10	5
(Turkey) 2011	2nd place, silver medalist(s)	11	3
(Czech Republic) 2012	8th	5	7
(Bulgaria) 2013	6th	6	6
2014	1st place, gold medalist(s)	11	3
2015	2nd place, silver medalist(s)	11	3
Total	7/12	65	30

=== Montreux Volley Masters ===
Champions Runners-up Third place Fourth place

Year	Position	W	L
(Switzerland) 2007	6th	2	3
(Switzerland) 2015	1st place, gold medalist(s)	4	1
(Switzerland) 2016	3rd place, bronze medalist(s)	3	2
(Switzerland) 2018	3rd place, bronze medalist(s)	4	1
(Switzerland) 2019	5th	3	1
Total	5/34	16	8

=== Mediterranean Games ===
Champions Runners-up Third place Fourth place

Year	Position
(Algeria) 1975	3rd place, bronze medalist(s)
(Socialist Federal Republic of Yugoslavia) 1979	4th
(Morocco) 1983	5th
(Syria) 1987	2nd place, silver medalist(s)
(Greece) 1991	2nd place, silver medalist(s)
(France) 1993	3rd place, bronze medalist(s)
(Italy) 1997	2nd place, silver medalist(s)
(Tunisia) 2001	2nd place, silver medalist(s)
(Spain) 2005	1st place, gold medalist(s)
(Italy) 2009	2nd place, silver medalist(s)
(Turkey) 2013	2nd place, silver medalist(s)
(Spain) 2018	3rd place, bronze medalist(s)
(Algeria) 2022	2nd place, silver medalist(s)
(Italy) 2026	1st place, gold medalist(s)
Total	14/14

=== Islamic Solidarity Games ===
Champions Runners-up Third place Fourth place

Year	Position	W	L
(Azerbaijan) 2017	2nd place, silver medalist(s)	3	2
(Turkey) 2021	1st place, gold medalist(s)	4	0
(Saudi Arabia) 2025	1st place, gold medalist(s)	5	0
Total	3/3	12	2

== Team ==
=== Current squad ===
Roster for the 2026 Women's European Volleyball Championship.

- Head coach: (Italy) Daniele Santarelli
- Asst. coach: (Italy) Andrea Zotta

No.	Pos.	Player	Birth date and age	Height (cm)	Block (cm)	Spike (cm)
1	L	Gizem Örge	26 April 1993 (age 33)	173	263	270
3	S	Cansu Özbay	17 October 1996 (age 30)	179	294	299
4	OP	Melissa Vargas	16 October 1999 (age 27)	194	315	325
6	OH	Saliha Şahin	5 November 1998 (age 28)	186	294	304
7	OH	Hande Baladın	1 September 1997 (age 29)	187	304	310
8	MB	Sinead Jack Kısal	8 November 1993 (age 33)	195	304	310
10	L	Eylül Yatgın	1 October 1999 (age 27)	170	270	285
11	OP	Derya Cebecioğlu	24 October 2000 (age 26)	181	303	308
12	S	Elif Şahin	19 January 2001 (age 25)	184	302	306
14	MB	Eda Erdem (C)	22 June 1987 (age 39)	188	302	315
15	MB	Deniz Uyanık	25 June 2001 (age 25)	195	310	315
18	MB	Zehra Güneş	7 July 1999 (age 27)	198	312	318
20	OH	Yaprak Erkek	2 September 2001 (age 25)	182	295	300
22	OH	İlkin Aydın	5 January 2000 (age 26)	183	298	299

=== Current squad (B) ===
Roster for the 2026 Mediterranean Games.

- Head coach: (Turkey) Gökhan Durmaz
- Asst. coach: (Turkey) Hakan Can Turan

No.	Pos.	Player	Birth date and age	Height (cm)	Block (cm)	Spike (cm)
1	L	Simay Kurt	29 July 2000 (age 26)	173	260	285
4	OH	Tuğba İvegin	2 February 1998 (age 28)	184	260	265
5	MB	Merve Atlıer	9 August 2006 (age 20)	191	305	310
8	OP	Defne Başyolcu	31 March 2000 (age 26)	193	304	316
10	OH	İdil Naz Başcan	31 March 2000 (age 26)	185	290	300
12	S	Arelya Karasoy Koçaş (C)	14 December 1996 (age 29)	181	283	291
13	S	Dilay Özdemir	15 August 2005 (age 21)	189	288	304
14	OH	Liza Safronova	17 January 2006 (age 20)	193	283	291
16	MB	Berka Buse Özden	16 April 2004 (age 22)	187	310	315
26	MB	Begüm Kaçmaz	26 April 2007 (age 19)	188	270	296
34	OP	Beren Yeşilırmak	1 June 2005 (age 21)	186	268	290
77	OH	Aylin Uysalcan	13 July 2009 (age 17)	196	305	320

=== Former squads ===
==== Olympic Games squads ====
- 2012 Summer Olympics – 9th place
  Gülden Kayalar, Gizem Güreşen, Polen Uslupehlivan, Bahar Toksoy, Özge Kırdar, Gözde Kırdar, Naz Aydemir, Esra Gümüş, Neriman Özsoy, Eda Erdem, Neslihan Demir Darnel, Büşra Cansu Head coach: Marco Aurelio Motta
- 2020 Summer Olympics – 5th place
  Simge Aköz, Cansu Özbay, Tuğba Şenoğlu, Şeyma Ercan, Kübra Akman, Hande Baladın, Meliha İsmailoğlu, Naz Aydemir, Meryem Boz, Eda Erdem Dündar, Zehra Güneş, Ebrar Karakurt Head coach: Giovanni Guidetti
- 2024 Summer Olympics – 4th place
  Gizem Örge, Cansu Özbay, Melissa Vargas, Hande Baladın, Meliha Diken, Derya Cebecioğlu, Elif Şahin, Eda Erdem Dündar, Zehra Güneş, Aslı Kalaç, İlkin Aydın, Ebrar Karakurt Head coach: Daniele Santarelli

==== World Championship squads ====
- 2025 FIVB World Championship – (silver) Silver Medal
  Gizem Örge, Cansu Özbay, Melissa Vargas, Hande Baladın, Sinead Jack Kısal, Derya Cebecioğlu, Elif Şahin, Eda Erdem Dündar, Zehra Güneş, Aslı Kalaç, Yaprak Erkek, İlkin Aydın, Eylül Akarçeşme, Ebrar Karakurt Head coach: Daniele Santarelli

==== World Cup squads ====
- 2023 FIVB Olympic Qualification Tournaments / World Cup – (gold) Gold Medal
  Gizem Örge, Simge Şebnem Aköz, Cansu Özbay, Melissa Vargas, Ayça Aykaç, Kübra Akman, Hande Baladın, Derya Cebecioğlu, Elif Şahin, Eda Erdem, Zehra Güneş, Aslı Kalaç, İlkin Aydın, Ebrar Karakurt Head coach: Daniele Santarelli

==== World Grand Prix squads ====
- 2012 FIVB World Grand Prix – (bronze) Bronze Medal
  Gülden Kayalar Kuzubaşıoğlu, Gözde Kırdar Sonsırma, Gizem Güreşen, Ergül Avcı, Bahar Toksoy, Güldeniz Önal, Naz Aydemir, Esra Gümüş, Neriman Özsoy, Eda Erdem, Neslihan Darnel and Nilay Özdemir Head coach: Marco Aurelio Motta

==== Nations League squads ====
- 2023 FIVB Nations League – (gold) Gold Medal
  Gizem Örge, Simge Şebnem Aköz, Cansu Özbay, Melissa Vargas, Ayça Aykaç, Kübra Akman, Hande Baladın, Derya Cebecioğlu, Elif Şahin, Eda Erdem (C), Saliha Şahin, Zehra Güneş, Aslı Kalaç, İlkin Aydın, Ebrar Karakurt Head coach: Daniele Santarelli
- 2026 FIVB Nations League – (gold) Gold Medal
  Gizem Örge, Cansu Özbay, Melissa Vargas, Saliha Şahin, Hande Baladın, Sinead Jack Kısal, Eylül Akarçeşme, Elif Şahin, Deniz Uyanık, Berka Buse Özden, Zehra Güneş, Yaprak Erkek, İlkin Aydın, Defne Başyolcu Head coach: Daniele Santarelli
- 2018 FIVB Nations League – (silver) Silver Medal
  Gizem Örge, Simge Şebnem Aköz, Kübra Akman, Beyza Arıcı, Şeyma Ercan, Hande Baladın, Buse Ünal, Meliha İsmailoğlu, Fulden Ural, Aslıhan Kılıç, Cansu Özbay, Meryem Boz, Eda Erdem, Zehra Güneş, Gamze Alikaya, Ceren Kapucu, Aylin Sarıoğlu, Yağmur Mislina Kılıç, Ebrar Karakurt, Saliha Şahin, Yasemin Güveli Head coach: Giovanni Guidetti
- 2021 FIVB Nations League – (bronze) Bronze Medal
  Simge Şebnem Aköz, Cansu Özbay, Tuğba Şenoğlu, Şeyma Ercan, Kübra Akman, Hande Baladın, Yasemin Güveli, Meliha İsmailoğlu, Ayça Aykaç, Naz Aydemir, Meryem Boz, Eda Erdem, Zehra Güneş, Aslı Kalaç, Ebrar Karakurt Head coach: Giovanni Guidetti

==== European Championship squads ====
- 2023 European Championship – (gold) Gold Medal
  Gizem Örge, Simge Şebnem Aköz, Cansu Özbay, Melissa Vargas, Ayça Aykaç, Kübra Akman, Hande Baladın, Derya Cebecioğlu, Elif Şahin, Eda Erdem (C), Zehra Güneş, Aslı Kalaç, İlkin Aydın, Ebrar Karakurt Head coach: Daniele Santarelli
- 2026 European Championship – (gold) Gold Medal
  Gizem Örge, Cansu Özbay, Melissa Vargas, Saliha Şahin, Hande Baladın, Sinead Jack Kısal, Eylül Akarçeşme, Derya Cebecioğlu, Elif Şahin, Eda Erdem, Deniz Uyanık, Zehra Güneş, Yaprak Erkek, İlkin Aydın Head coach: Daniele Santarelli
- 2003 European Championship – (silver) Silver Medal
  Bahar Mert, Esra Gümüş, Sinem Akap, Özlem Özçelik, Aysun Özbek, Natalia Hanikoğlu, Mesude Kuyan, Pelin Çelik, Çiğdem Can, Gülden Kayalar, Seda Tokatlıoğlu and Neslihan Darnel Head coach: Reşat Yazıcıoğulları
- 2019 European Championship – (silver) Silver Medal
  Simge Şebnem Aköz, Cansu Özbay, Şeyma Ercan, Kübra Akman, Hande Baladın, Meliha İsmailoğlu, Naz Aydemir, Gözde Yılmaz, Meryem Boz, Eda Erdem, Zehra Güneş, Aylin Sarıoğlu, Fatma Yıldırım, Ebrar Karakurt Head coach: Giovanni Guidetti
- 2011 European Championship – (bronze) Bronze Medal
  Asuman Karakoyun, Gözde Kırdar Sonsırma, Gizem Güreşen, Elif Onur, Ergül Avcı, Polen Uslupehlivan, Bahar Toksoy, Güldeniz Önal, Naz Aydemir, Esra Gümüş, Neriman Özsoy, Eda Erdem, Neşve Büyükbayram, Selime İlyasoğlu, Neslihan Darnel, Özge Kırdar Çemberci and Ceren Kestirengöz Head coach: Marco Aurelio Motta
- 2017 European Championship – (bronze) Bronze Medal
  Gizem Örge, Gözde Kırdar Bracceschi, Kübra Akman, Merve Dalbeler, Polen Uslupehlivan, Bahar Toksoy, Güldeniz Önal, Naz Aydemir, Neriman Özsoy, Eda Erdem, Hande Baladın, Simge Şebnem Aköz, Gamze Alikaya, Meryem Boz Head coach: Giovanni Guidetti
- 2021 European Championship – (bronze) Bronze Medal
  Simge Şebnem Aköz, Cansu Özbay, Tuğba Şenoğlu, Hande Baladın, Yasemin Güveli, Meliha İsmailoğlu, Ayça Aykaç, Buse Ünal, Meryem Boz, Eda Erdem, Zehra Güneş, İlkin Aydın, Beliz Başkır, Ebrar Karakurt. Head coach: Giovanni Guidetti

==== European Games squads ====
- 2015 European Games – (gold) Gold Medal
  Seniye Merve Dalbeler, Gizem Karadayı, Dicle Nur Babat, Kübra Akman, Polen Uslupehlivan, Seda Aslanyürek, Büşra Cansu, Güldeniz Önal Paşalıoğlu (C), Naz Aydemir Akyol, Neriman Özsoy, Gözde Yılmaz, Meliha İsmailoğlu, Aslı Kalaç and Çağla Akın. Head coach: Ferhat Akbaş

==== European League squads ====
- 2014 European League – (gold) Gold Medal
  Ezgi Dilik, Kübra Akman, Ceylan Arısan, Bihter Dumanoğlu, Polen Uslupehlivan, Yeliz Başa, Hatice Gizem Örge, Cansu Çetin, Gözde Yılmaz, Meliha İsmailoğlu, Çağla Akın and Özgenur Yurtdagülen. Head coach: Ferhat Akbaş
- 2009 European League – (silver) Silver Medal
  İpek Soroğlu, Pelin Çelik, Neslihan Darnel, Nihan Yeldan, Seda Tokatlıoğlu, Deniz Hakyemez, Naz Aydemir, Esra Gümüş, Eda Erdem, Duygu Bal, Gözde Kırdar and Gülden Kayalar Head coach: Alessandro Chiappini
- 2011 European League – (silver) Silver Medal
  Asuman Karakoyun, Gizem Güreşen, Elif Onur, Polen Uslupehlivan, Bahar Toksoy, Güldeniz Önal, Naz Aydemir, Esra Gümüş, Eda Erdem, Neşve Büyükbayram, Selime İlyasoğlu, Neslihan Demir, Ceren Kapucu. Head coach: Marco Aurelio Motta
- 2015 European League – (silver) Silver Medal
  Melike Yılmaz, Birgül Güler, Buse Kayacan, Fatma Yıldırım, Ceren Kestirengöz, Ezgi Dilik, Ezgi Dağdelenler, Meryem Boz, Ayşe Melis Gürkaynak, Damla Çakıroğlu, Cansu Aydınoğulları, Serpil Ersarı. Head coach: İsmail Yengil
- 2010 European League – (bronze) Bronze Medal
  Pelin Çelik, Deniz Hakyemez, Esra Gümüş, Neslihan Demir, Gökçen Denkel, Seray Altay, Seda Aslanyürek, İpek Soroğlu, Merve Dalbeler, Neriman Özsoy, Nihan Güneyligil, Eda Erdem, Gizem Karadayi, Bahar Toksoy, Naz Aydemir, Büşra Kılıçlı, Neşve Büyükbayram, Asuman Karakoyun, Dilara Bilge, Duygu Bal, Polen Uslupehlivan, Meryem Boz, Elif Onur Head coach: Mehmet Bedestenlioğlu

==== Montreux Volley Masters squads ====
- 2015 Montreux Volley Masters – (gold) Gold Medal
  Seniye Merve Dalbeler, Gizem Karadayı, Dicle Nur Babat, Kübra Akman, Polen Uslupehlivan, Seda Aslanyürek, Büşra Cansu, Güldeniz Önal Paşalıoğlu (C), Naz Aydemir Akyol, Neriman Özsoy, Gözde Yılmaz, Meliha İsmailoğlu, Aslı Kalaç, Çağla Akın and Ezgi Dağdelenler. Head coach: Ferhat Akbaş
- 2016 Montreux Volley Masters – (bronze) Bronze Medal
  Gizem Örge, Seniye Merve Dalbeler, Gizem Karadayi, Tutku Burcu Yüzgenç, Kübra Akman, Polen Uslupehlivan, Hande Baladın, Meliha İsmailoğlu, Aslı Kalaç, Güldeniz Önal, Naz Aydemir, Melis Durul, Melike Neziha Yilmaz, Eda Erdem, Arelya Karasoy, Ceylan Arısan, Nursevil Aydinlar, Zehra Güneş, Ezgi Dilik, Gözde Yılmaz, Özgenur Yurtdagülen, Fatma Yıldırım. Head coach: Ferhat Akbaş
- 2018 Montreux Volley Masters – (bronze) Bronze Medal
  Gizem Örge, Simge Şebnem Aköz, Cansu Özbay, Beyza Arıcı, Şeyma Ercan, Hande Baladın, Meliha İsmailoğlu, Çağla Akın, Meryem Boz, Eda Erdem, Ebrar Karakurt, Zehra Güneş, Aylin Sarıoğlu. Head coach: Giovanni Guidetti

==== Mediterranean Games squads ====
Note: The following list may not be complete.

- 2005 Mediterranean Games – (gold) Gold Medal
  Bahar Mert, Gülden Kayalar, Özlem İşseven, Aysun Özbek, Duygu Sipahioğlu, Natalia Hanikoğlu, Deniz Hakyemez, Elif Ağca, Seda Tokatlıoğlu, Neslihan Demir, Gözde Kırdar Head coach: Reşat Yazıcıoğulları
- 2026 Mediterranean Games – (gold) Gold Medal
  Simay Kurt, Tuğba İvegin, Merve Atlıer, Defne Başyolcu, İdil Naz Başcan, Arelya Karasoy Koçaş, Dilay Özdemir, Liza Safronova, Berka Buse Özden, Begüm Kaçmaz, Beren Yeşilırmak, Aylin Uysalcan Head coach: Gökhan Durmaz
- 2009 Mediterranean Games – (silver) Silver Medal
  Ayşe Gokçen Denkel, Bahar Toksoy, Deniz Hakyemez, Esra Gümüş, Gizem Güreşen, İpek Soroğlu, Naz Aydemir, Neslihan Darnel, Nihan Yeldan, Özge Kırdar, Pelin Çelik, Seda Tokatlıoğlu Head coach: Alessandro Chiappini
- 2013 Mediterranean Games – (silver) Silver Medal
  Bahar Toksoy, Büşra Cansu, Ergül Avcı, Esra Gümüş Kırıcı, Gizem Karadayı, Gözde Kırdar Sonsırma, Güldeniz Önal, Naz Aydemir, Neslihan Demir, Özge Çemberci, Polen Uslupehlivan, Seda Tokatlıoğlu Head coach: Massimo Barbolini
- 2022 Mediterranean Games – (silver) Silver Medal
  Aslıhan Kılıç, Buse Ünal, Tutku Burcu Yüzgenç, İlkin Aydın, Derya Cebecioğlu, Ezgi Akyaldız, Yaprak Erkek, Ayçin Akyol, Emine Arıcı, Yasemin Yıldırım, Buse Kayacan Sonsırma, Melis Yılmaz Head coach: Alper Hamurcu
- 2018 Mediterranean Games – (bronze) Bronze Medal
  Aslı Kalaç, Aslıhan Kılıç, Buse Ünal, Ceren Kestirengöz, Melis Durul, Melisa Memiş, Özgenur Yurtdagülen, Saliha Şahin, Tuğba Şenoğlu, Yağmur Mislina Kılıç, Yasemin Güveli Head coach: Alper Hamurcu

==== Islamic Solidarity Games squads ====
- 2021 Islamic Solidarity Games – (gold) Gold Medal
  Aslıhan Kılıç, Ayçin Akyol, Buket Gülübay, Buse Kayacan, Ceren Kapucu, Emine Arıcı, Ezgi Akyaldız, İdil Naz Kanbur, İlkin Aydın, Melis Yılmaz, Yaprak Erkek, Yasemin Özel, Yasemin Yıldırım, Zeynep Sude Demirel Head coach: Alper Hamurcu
- 2025 Islamic Solidarity Games – (gold) Gold Medal
  Aslı Tecimer, Ayşe Çürük, Berka Buse Özden, Defne Başyolcu, Deniz Uyanık, Dilay Özdemir, Ege Melisa Bükmen, Karmen Aksoy, Liza Safronova, Merve Nur Öztürk, Nazlı Eda Kafkas, Selin Adalı Head coach: Yunus Öçal
- 2017 Islamic Solidarity Games – (silver) Silver Medal
  Ada Germen, Arelya Karasoy, Bihter Dumanoğlu, Buse Melis Kara, Gizem Mısra Aşçı, Hande Naz Şimşek, Hümay Topaloğlu, Janset Cemre Erkul, Meliha İsmailoğlu, Melike Yılmaz, Nursevil Aydınlar, Rida Erlalelitepe, Su Zent, Yağmur Mislina Kılıç Head coach: Cihan Cintay

=== Head Coaches ===
- (Turkey) Reşat Yazıcıoğulları (2003–2007)
- (Italy) Alessandro Chiappini (2007–2010)
- (Turkey) Mehmet Bedestenlioğlu (2010–2011)
- (Brazil) Marco Aurélio Motta (2011–2012)
- (Italy) Massimo Barbolini (2012–2015)
- (Turkey) Ferhat Akbaş (2015–2017)
- (Italy) Giovanni Guidetti (2017–2022)
- (Italy) Daniele Santarelli (2023–present)

== Kit providers ==
The table below shows the history of kit providers for the Türkiye national volleyball team.

Period	Kit provider
2023 – 2025	Puma
2026 – present	Adidas

== See also ==
  - Women's
- Türkiye Women's national volleyball team U23
- Türkiye Women's national volleyball team U20
- Türkiye Women's national volleyball team U18
  - Men's
- Türkiye Men's national volleyball team
- Türkiye Men's national volleyball team U23
- Türkiye Men's national volleyball team U21
- Türkiye Men's national volleyball team U19
