= 2016 Montreux Volley Masters =

Women's volleyball tournament

Tournament details
- Host country: Switzerland
- Dates: 31 May – 5 June 2016
- Teams: 8
- Venue: 1 (in 1 host city)

Final positions
- Champions: China (6th title)

Tournament awards
- MVP: (China) Hui Ruoqi

The 2016 Montreux Volley Masters is a women's volleyball competition set in Montreux, Switzerland.

== Participating teams ==
Pool A	Pool B
Belgium; Brazil; China; Turkey (Defending champion)	Netherlands; Serbia; Switzerland; Thailand

== Group stage ==
=== Group A ===
Pos	Team	Pld	W	L	Pts	SW	SL	SR	SPW	SPL	SPR	Qualification
1	China	3	2	1	6	7	3	2.333	230	213	1.080	Semifinals
2	Turkey	3	2	1	5	7	6	1.167	284	277	1.025	Semifinals
3	Brazil	3	1	2	4	5	6	0.833	239	249	0.960	
4	Belgium	3	1	2	3	3	7	0.429	219	233	0.940	

Date	Time		Score		Set 1	Set 2	Set 3	Set 4	Set 5	Total	Report
31 May	18:45	China	3–0	Brazil	25–20	25–17	25–22			75–59	P2 P3
31 May	21:15	Turkey	1–3	Belgium	24–26	25–16	21–25	13–25		83–92	P2 P3
1 June	18:45	China	1–3	Turkey	21–25	25–15	19–25	15–25		80–90	P2 P3
2 June	16:30	Belgium	0–3	China	23–25	20–25	21–25			64–75	P2 P3
2 June	18:45	Turkey	3–2	Brazil	25–19	26–28	20–25	25–21	15–12	111–105	P2 P3
3 June	16:30	Brazil	3–0	Belgium	25–21	25–20	25–22			75–63	P2 P3

=== Group B ===
Pos	Team	Pld	W	L	Pts	SW	SL	SR	SPW	SPL	SPR	Qualification
1	Thailand	3	3	0	7	9	4	2.250	288	264	1.091	Semifinals
2	Netherlands	3	2	1	7	8	4	2.000	279	252	1.107	Semifinals
3	Serbia	3	1	2	4	6	6	1.000	268	245	1.094	
4	Switzerland	3	0	3	0	0	9	0.000	151	225	0.671	

Date	Time		Score		Set 1	Set 2	Set 3	Set 4	Set 5	Total	Report
31 May	16:30	Serbia	3–0	Switzerland	25–10	25–19	25–17			75–46	P2 P3
1 June	16:30	Switzerland	0–3	Netherlands	22–25	9–25	19–25			50–75	P2 P3
1 June	21:15	Serbia	2–3	Thailand	25–16	19–25	21–25	25–20	13–15	103–101	P2 P3
2 June	21:15	Thailand	3–2	Netherlands	26–28	21–25	25–20	25–23	15–10	112–106	P2 P3
3 June	18:45	Thailand	3–0	Switzerland	25–23	25–14	25–18			75–55	P2 P3
3 June	21:15	Netherlands	3–1	Serbia	25–18	25–23	22–25	26–24		98–90	P2 P3

== Classification round ==
Date	Time		Score		Set 1	Set 2	Set 3	Set 4	Set 5	Total	Report
4 June	13.00	Brazil	3–0	Switzerland	25–6	25–18	25–21			75–45	P2 P3
4 June	15.30	Serbia	2–3	Belgium	22–25	25–27	25–21	25–18	8–15	105–106	P2 P3

== Final round ==
Semifinal
4 June
China	3
Netherlands	2
4 June
Thailand	3
Turkey	2

Final
5 June
China	3
Thailand	0
Third place match
5 June
Netherlands	1
Turkey	3

=== Semifinal ===
Date	Time		Score		Set 1	Set 2	Set 3	Set 4	Set 5	Total	Report
4 June	18.30	Thailand	3–2	Turkey	25–22	21–25	25–18	16–25	19–17	106–107	P2 P3
4 June	21.00	China	3–2	Netherlands	20–25	25–23	23–25	25–20	15–9	108–102	P2 P3

=== Third place match ===
Date	Time		Score		Set 1	Set 2	Set 3	Set 4	Set 5	Total	Report
5 June	13.30	Turkey	3–1	Netherlands	21–25	25–16	25–15	25–22		96–78	P2 P3

=== Final ===
Date	Time		Score		Set 1	Set 2	Set 3	Set 4	Set 5	Total	Report
5 June	16.00	Thailand	0–3	China	14–25	20–25	23–25			57–75	P2 P3

== Final standings ==
Rank	Team
1st place, gold medalist(s)	China
2nd place, silver medalist(s)	Thailand
3rd place, bronze medalist(s)	Turkey
4	Netherlands
5	Belgium
5	Brazil
7	Serbia
7	Switzerland

== Awards ==
- Most valuable player
  (China) Hui Ruoqi
- Best outside spikers
  (China) Hui Ruoqi
  (Thailand) Ajcharaporn Kongyot
- Best libero
  (Thailand) Piyanut Pannoy
- Best middle blockers
  (China) Zhang Xiaoya
  (Thailand) Hattaya Bamrungsuk
- Best setter
  (Thailand) Nootsara Tomkom
- Best opposite spiker
  (China) Gong Xiangyu
