= Volleyball at the 2018 Mediterranean Games – Women's tournament =

Women's Volleyball at the 2018 Mediterranean Games
- Venue: Tarraco Arena Plaza; Pabellón Municipal del Serrallo
- Location: (Spain) Tarragona
- Dates: 22 June – 1 July
- Nations: 12

Medalists
gold medal	Croatia (2nd title)
silver medal	Greece
bronze medal	Turkey

The women's volleyball tournament at the 2018 Mediterranean Games was held from 22 June to 1 July at the Tarraco Arena Plaza and the Pabellón Municipal del Serrallo in Tarragona.

== Participating teams ==
- Albania
- Algeria
- Bosnia and Herzegovina
- Croatia
- Cyprus
- Greece
- France
- Italy
- Portugal
- Spain (host)
- Slovenia
- Turkey

== Preliminary round ==
All times are local (UTC+2).

=== Group A ===
Pos	Team	Pld	W	L	Pts	SW	SL	SR	SPW	SPL	SPR	Qualification
1	Greece	2	2	0	5	6	2	3.000	184	149	1.235	Quarterfinals
2	Italy	2	1	1	4	5	3	1.667	178	158	1.127	Quarterfinals
3	Cyprus	2	0	2	0	0	6	0.000	95	150	0.633	

Date	Time		Score		Set 1	Set 2	Set 3	Set 4	Set 5	Total	Report
22 Jun	12:30	Italy	2–3	Greece	25–23	23–25	21–25	25–21	9–15	103–109	P2
23 Jun	19:00	Cyprus	0–3	Greece	14–25	20–25	12–25			46–75	P2
25 Jun	11:00	Italy	3–0	Cyprus	25–15	25–14	25–20			75–49	P2

=== Group B ===
Pos	Team	Pld	W	L	Pts	SW	SL	SR	SPW	SPL	SPR	Qualification
1	Turkey	2	2	0	6	6	2	3.000	196	172	1.140	Quarterfinals
2	Spain	2	1	1	3	4	3	1.333	167	161	1.037	Quarterfinals
3	Bosnia and Herzegovina	2	0	2	0	1	6	0.167	139	169	0.822	

Date	Time		Score		Set 1	Set 2	Set 3	Set 4	Set 5	Total	Report
22 Jun	10:00	Turkey	3–1	Bosnia and Herzegovina	25–22	25–15	19–25	25–18		94–80	P2
23 Jun	13:00	Spain	3–0	Bosnia and Herzegovina	25–22	25–16	25–21			75–59	P2
24 Jun	19:00	Turkey	3–1	Spain	26–24	26–28	25–19	25–21		102–92	P2

=== Group C ===
Pos	Team	Pld	W	L	Pts	SW	SL	SR	SPW	SPL	SPR	Qualification
1	Croatia	2	2	0	6	6	1	6.000	172	143	1.203	Quarterfinals
2	France	2	1	1	3	4	3	1.333	159	157	1.013	Quarterfinals
3	Albania	2	0	2	0	0	6	0.000	119	150	0.793	

Date	Time		Score		Set 1	Set 2	Set 3	Set 4	Set 5	Total	Report
23 Jun	10:00	Croatia	3–0	Albania	25–21	25–19	25–19			75–59	P2
24 Jun	11:00	France	3–0	Albania	25–23	25–18	25–19			75–60	P2
25 Jun	16:00	Croatia	3–1	France	22–25	25–19	25–21	25–19		97–84	P2

=== Group D ===
Pos	Team	Pld	W	L	Pts	SW	SL	SR	SPW	SPL	SPR	Qualification
1	Slovenia	2	2	0	6	6	0	MAX	150	96	1.563	Quarterfinals
2	Portugal	2	1	1	3	3	3	1.000	135	123	1.098	Quarterfinals
3	Algeria	2	0	2	0	0	6	0.000	84	150	0.560	

Date	Time		Score		Set 1	Set 2	Set 3	Set 4	Set 5	Total	Report
23 Jun	16:00	Algeria	0–3	Slovenia	10–25	16–25	10–25			36–75	P2
24 Jun	16:00	Portugal	0–3	Slovenia	20–25	19–25	21–25			60–75	P2
25 Jun	19:00	Algeria	0–3	Portugal	7–25	20–25	21–25			48–75	P2

== Final round ==
=== Classification bracket ===
Classification 5–8
29 June
Spain	3
Slovenia	1
29 June
Italy	3
Portugal	0

Fifth place
30 June
Spain	1
Italy	3
Seventh place
30 June
Slovenia	3
Portugal	0

==== Classification 5–8 ====
Date	Time		Score		Set 1	Set 2	Set 3	Set 4	Set 5	Total	Report
29 Jun	16:00	Spain	3–1	Slovenia	25–21	22–25	25–18	25–22		97–86	P2
29 Jun	19:00	Italy	3–0	Portugal	25–12	25–19	25–19			75–50	P2

==== Seventh place game ====
Date	Time		Score		Set 1	Set 2	Set 3	Set 4	Set 5	Total	Report
30 Jun	16:00	Slovenia	3–0	Portugal	25–21	25–19	25–14			75–54	P2

==== Fifth place game ====
Date	Time		Score		Set 1	Set 2	Set 3	Set 4	Set 5	Total	Report
30 Jun	19:00	Spain	1–3	Italy	15–25	26–28	25–22	25–27		91–102	P2

=== Championship bracket ===
Quarter-finals
28 June
Greece	3
Spain	1
28 June
Slovenia	2
France	3
28 June
Turkey	3
Italy	1
28 June
Croatia	3
Portugal	1

Semi-finals
29 June
Greece	3
France	2
29 June
Turkey	2
Croatia	3

Final
1 July
Greece	1
Croatia	3
Third place
30 June
France	1
Turkey	3

==== Quarterfinals ====
Date	Time		Score		Set 1	Set 2	Set 3	Set 4	Set 5	Total	Report
28 Jun	10:00	Croatia	3–1	Portugal	26–24	16–25	28–26	25–20		95–95	P2
28 Jun	13:00	Slovenia	2–3	France	11–25	25–18	25–23	16–25	7–15	84–106	P2
28 Jun	16:00	Turkey	3–1	Italy	22–25	25–16	25–16	25–23		97–80	P2
28 Jun	19:00	Greece	3–1	Spain	26–24	18–25	25–23	28–26		97–98	P2

==== Semifinals ====
Date	Time		Score		Set 1	Set 2	Set 3	Set 4	Set 5	Total	Report
29 Jun	16:00	Greece	3–2	France	15–25	25–16	19–25	25–20	15–13	99–99	P2
29 Jun	19:00	Turkey	2–3	Croatia	25–22	15–25	25–20	21–25	12–15	98–107	P2

==== Third place game ====
Date	Time		Score		Set 1	Set 2	Set 3	Set 4	Set 5	Total	Report
30 Jun	16:00	France	1–3	Turkey	26–24	25–27	14–25	19–25		84–101	P2

==== Final ====
Date	Time		Score		Set 1	Set 2	Set 3	Set 4	Set 5	Total	Report
1 Jul	10:00	Greece	1–3	Croatia	16–25	13–25	25–17	14–25		68–92	P2

== Final standings ==
Rank	Team
1st place, gold medalist(s)	Croatia
2nd place, silver medalist(s)	Greece
3rd place, bronze medalist(s)	Turkey
4	France
5	Italy
6	Spain
7	Slovenia
8	Portugal
9	Albania
9	Algeria
9	Bosnia and Herzegovina
9	Cyprus
