= İpek Emiroğlu =

Turkish football referee

- Born: 1992 (age 33–34); Denizli, Turkey

Domestic
Years	League	Role
2010–2011	Women's Regional League	assistant referee
2010–2014	Women's Second League	assistant referee
2014–	Women's Third League	referee
2013–	Women's Second League	referee
2014–	Women's First League	referee
2014–	U-21 League	referee

İpek Emiroğlu (born 1992) is a Turkish female association football referee.

== Early life ==
İpek Emiroğlu was born 1992 in Denizli, Turkey. She is a student of Veterinary medicine at Uludağ University in Bursa.

== Referee career ==
Emiroğlu began her referee career in a Men's U-21 League match as the fourth official in her hometown in 2009. She served in several matches of the different Boys' Leagues, Regional Amateur League, TFF Third League and in all levels of the Women's leagues as assistant referee. She debuted as referee in a Women's Second League match on December 1, 2013, and served first time as referee in the Women's First League on November 9, 2014.

İpek Emiroğlu is the youngest ever female football referee in Turkey.
