= İpek Derici =

Turkish basketball player

İpek Derici (born August 19, 1990, in Istanbul, Turkey) is a Turkish female basketball player. The young national plays for Beşiktaş at the forward position. She is 189 centimetres (6.20 ft) tall and weighs 71 kilograms (157 lb). Derici graduated from the University of North Carolina.

== See also ==
- Turkish women in sports
