= Volleyball at the 2026 Mediterranean Games – Women's tournament =

Women's Volleyball at the 2026 Mediterranean Games
- Venue: Palamazzola Sport Hall; PalaVentura
- Location: (Italy) Taranto and Lecce
- Dates: 20 – 30 August
- Nations: 9

Medalists
gold medal	Turkey (2nd title)
silver medal	Italy
bronze medal	Serbia

The women's volleyball tournament at the 2026 Mediterranean Games is currently holding from 20 to 30 August at the Palamazzola Sport Hall and PalaVentura in Taranto and Lecce, Italy, respectively.

== Participating teams ==
- Algeria
- Bosnia and Herzegovina
- Egypt
- Greece
- Italy (host)
- Kosovo
- North Macedonia
- Serbia
- Turkey

== Preliminary round ==
All times are local (UTC+2).

=== Group A ===
Pos	Team	Pld	W	L	Pts	SW	SL	SR	SPW	SPL	SPR	Qualification
1	Italy	3	3	0	9	9	0	MAX	225	147	1.531	Final round
2	Serbia	3	2	1	6	6	3	2.000	207	179	1.156	Final round
3	Bosnia and Herzegovina	3	1	2	3	3	6	0.500	190	203	0.936	
4	Egypt	3	0	3	0	0	9	0.000	133	226	0.588	

Source: Taranto 2026

Date	Time		Score		Set 1	Set 2	Set 3	Set 4	Set 5	Total	Report
20 Aug	18:00	Italy	3–0	Bosnia and Herzegovina	25–23	25–20	25–17			75–60	P2 P3
21 Aug	14:00	Serbia	3–0	Egypt	25–11	26–24	25–14			76–49	P2 P3
23 Aug	11:00	Serbia	3–0	Bosnia and Herzegovina	25–17	25–18	25–20			75–55	P2 P3
24 Aug	17:00	Italy	3–0	Egypt	25–10	25–15	25–6			75–31	P2 P3
26 Aug	20:00	Italy	3–0	Serbia	25–18	25–21	25–17			75–56	P2 P3
27 Aug	11:00	Bosnia and Herzegovina	3–0	Egypt	25–22	25–16	25–15			75–53	P2 P3

=== Group B ===
Pos	Team	Pld	W	L	Pts	SW	SL	SR	SPW	SPL	SPR	Qualification
1	Turkey	4	4	0	12	12	1	12.000	322	190	1.695	Final round
2	Greece	4	3	1	9	10	4	2.500	319	258	1.236	Final round
3	Kosovo	4	2	2	6	6	7	0.857	287	281	1.021	
4	North Macedonia	4	1	3	3	5	10	0.500	283	342	0.827	
5	Algeria	4	0	4	0	1	12	0.083	185	325	0.569	

Source: Taranto 2026

Date	Time		Score		Set 1	Set 2	Set 3	Set 4	Set 5	Total	Report
20 Aug	17:00	North Macedonia	0–3	Turkey	4–25	16–25	15–25			35–75	P2 P3
20 Aug	20:00	Kosovo	0–3	Greece	25–27	21–25	15–25			61–77	P2 P3
21 Aug	11:00	Algeria	0–3	Kosovo	19–25	10–25	14–25			43–75	P2 P3
22 Aug	11:00	Greece	3–0	Algeria	25–16	25–11	25–11			75–38	P2 P3
24 Aug	11:00	Kosovo	3–1	North Macedonia	30–28	25–17	19–25	25–16		99–86	P2 P3
24 Aug	14:00	Algeria	0–3	Turkey	7–25	13–25	13–25			33–75	P2 P3
26 Aug	14:00	Turkey	3–0	Kosovo	25–17	25–17	25–18			75–52	P2 P3
26 Aug	17:00	Greece	3–1	North Macedonia	22–25	25–13	25–7	25–17		97–62	P2 P3
27 Aug	14:00	North Macedonia	3–1	Algeria	25–10	25–27	25–14	25–20		100–71	P2 P3
27 Aug	17:00	Turkey	3–1	Greece	22–25	25–17	25–12	25–16		97–70	P2 P3

== Final round ==
=== Championship bracket ===
Semi-finals
29 August
Italy	3
Greece	0
29 August
Turkey	3
Serbia	1

Final
30 August
Italy	0
Turkey	3
Third place
30 August
Greece	2
Serbia	3

==== Semifinals ====
Date	Time		Score		Set 1	Set 2	Set 3	Set 4	Set 5	Total	Report
29 Aug	11:00	Turkey	3–1	Serbia	25–16	23–25	25–21	25–22		98–84	P2 P3
29 Aug	14:00	Italy	3–0	Greece	25–22	25–14	25–22			75–58	P2 P3

==== Third place game ====
Date	Time		Score		Set 1	Set 2	Set 3	Set 4	Set 5	Total	Report
30 Aug	11:00	Greece	2–3	Serbia	25–22	16–25	20–25	25–18	7–15	93–105	P2 P3

==== Final ====
Date	Time		Score		Set 1	Set 2	Set 3	Set 4	Set 5	Total	Report
30 Aug	17:00	Italy	0–3	Turkey	22–25	24–26	19–25			65–76	P2 P3

== Final standings ==
Rank	Team
1st place, gold medalist(s)	Turkey
2nd place, silver medalist(s)	Italy
3rd place, bronze medalist(s)	Serbia
4	Greece
5	Kosovo
6	Bosnia and Herzegovina
7	North Macedonia
8	Egypt
9	Algeria

== See also ==
- Volleyball at the Mediterranean Games
- Volleyball at the 2026 Mediterranean Games – Men's tournament

== External link ==
- 2026 Mediterranean Games – Volleyball
- Preliminary round
- Final round
- Volleyball schedule
