= Derya Cebecioğlu =

Turkish volleyball player (born 2000)

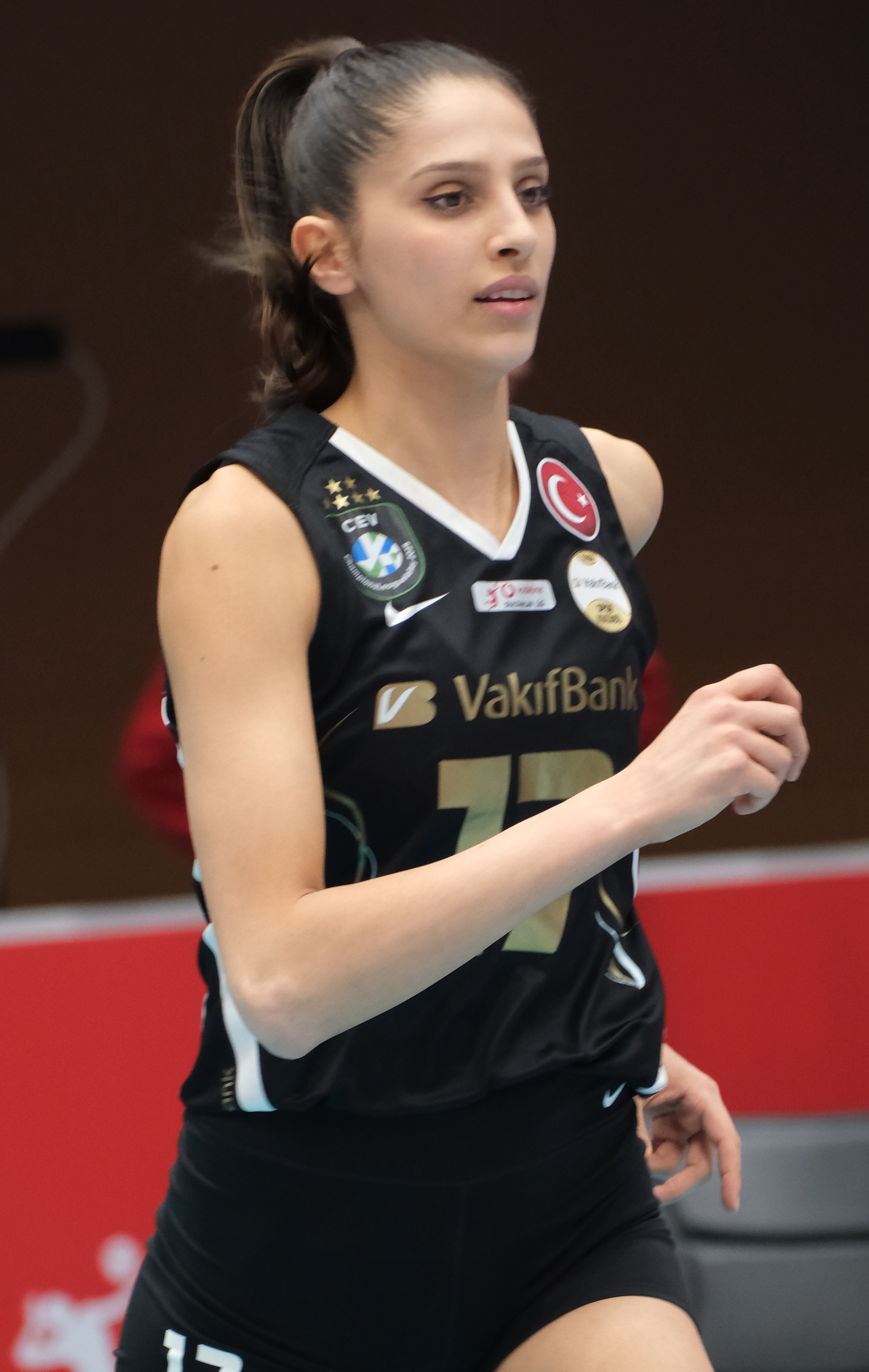
- Derya Cebecioğlu in 2025

Personal information
- Born: 24 October 2000 (age 26); Tarsus, Mersin, Turkey
- Height: 1.81 m (5 ft 11 in)
- Weight: 69 kg (152 lb)
- Spike: 304 cm (120 in)
- Block: 292 cm (115 in)

Volleyball information
- Position: Outside Hitter / Opposite

Career
Years
- 2014–2017
- 2018
- 2019
- 2020
- 2021–2022
- 2023–2026
- 2026-
Teams
- VakıfBank II
- →Bahçelievler
- VakıfBank
- →Sistem9 Yeşilyurt
- VakıfBank
- Kurobe AquaFairies
- THY S.K

National team
- 2014
- 2017
- 2018
- 2017–2019
- 2022–
- Turkey U-15
- Turkey U-18
- Turkey U-19
- Turkey U-20
- Turkey
Honours
Women's Volleyball
Representing Turkey
FIVB World Championship
Silver medal – second place	2025 Thailand	Team
FIVB Nations League
Gold medal – first place	2023 Arlington	Team
European Championship
Gold medal – first place	2023 Belgium/Estonia/Germany/Italy	Team
Gold medal – first place	2026 Azerbaijan-Czechia-Sweden-Turkey	Team
Mediterranean Games
Silver medal – second place	2022 Oran	Team

Derya Cebecioğlu (born 24 October 2000) is a Turkish volleyball player. She is 1.81 m (5 ft 11 1/2 in) tall at 69 kg (152 lb), and plays in the Outside Hitter and sometimes Opposite position. She last played for VakıfBank S.K. in Istanbul. She is a member of the Turkey women's national volleyball team.

== Club career ==
Cebecioğlu is 1.81 m (5 ft 11 1/2 in) tall at 69 kg (152 lb). She has a spike height of 304 cm (120 in) and a block height of 292 cm (115 in) playing in the Outside Hitter position and occasionally as an Opposite.

She started her sport career at the age of 14 in VakıfBbank S.K. and played in the academy teams. With the youth team, she won the Turkish Cup, and later with the junior women's team, she won two consecutive years Turkish Championship.

Before she was promoted to the VakıfBank A team in the 2018–19 season, she was loaned out to Bahçelievler S.K. She won several times titles at the Turkish Women's Volleyball League, Turkish Women's Volleyball Cup, Turkish Women's Volleyball Super Cup as well as at the FIVB Volleyball Women's Club World Championship and the CEV Women's Champions League. In the 2019–20 Turkish Women's Volleyball League season, she was loaned out to Sistem9 Yeşilyurt for two seasons. She returned to her club VakıfBank in the 2020–21 season.

Late May 2023, it was announced that Cebecioğlu signed a deal with Kurobe AquaFairies to play in the 2023–24 season of the Japanese top-level league V.League. On 1 June 2023, she left VakıfBank S.K.

Cebecioğlu returned to VakıfBank in 2024 where she won another champions league title in 2026, as well as two more Turkish League titles..

Recently, Istanbul based THY S.K announced Cebecioğlu would be a part of their roster for the 2026/2027 season.

== International career ==
In 2014, she was admitted to the Turkey girls' national U-15 team and won the gold medal at the Balkan Volleyball championship.

She took part at the 2017 FIVB Volleyball Girls' U18 World Championship in Argentina with the Turkey U-18 team, which ranked fourth.

In 2018, she won the silver medal with the Turkey national U-19 team at the Balkan Volleyball Championship in Čačak, Serbia. She also received the Fair Play Award of the competition. Her national team placed fourth at the 2018 Women's U19 Volleyball European Championship in Albania. She was named one of the Best Outside Hitters of the competition.

She was part of the Turkey U-20 team, which placed fourth at the FIVB Volleyball Women's U20 World Championships in 2017, again in 2019, both held in Mexico.

Cebecioğlu debuted in the Turkey national team playing at the 2018 FIVB Volleyball Women's World Championship in Japan. The team finished the competition at tenth place. At the 2022 FIVB Volleyball Women's World Championship, her team ranked eighth. She won the silver medal at the 2022 Mediterranean Games in Oran, Algeria. She became gold medalist at the 2023 FIVB Volleyball Women's Nations League in Arlington, Texas, United States.

== Personal life ==
Derya Cebecioğlu was born in Mersin, Turkey on 24 October 2000.

== Honours ==
=== Club ===
==== VakıfBank ====
Turkish Women's Volleyball League
(gold) 2019, 2021, 2022

Turkish Women's Volleyball Cup
(gold) 2021, 2022, 2023

Turkish Women's Volleyball Super Cup
(gold) 2021
(silver) 2020, 2022

FIVB Volleyball Women's Club World Championship
(gold) 2018, 2021
(silver) 2022
(bronze) 2019

CEV Women's Champions League
(gold) 2021–22, 2022–23, 2025–26
(silver) 2020–21

=== International ===
==== Turkey U-15 ====
Balkan Volleyball Championship
(gold) 2014

==== Turkey U-19 ====
Balkan Volleyball Championship
(silver) 2018

==== Turkey ====
Mediterranean Games
(silver) 2022

FIVB Volleyball Women's Nations League
(gold) 2023

CEV European Championship
(gold) 2023, 2026

FIVB Women's Volleyball World Championship
(silver) 2025

=== Individual ===
Best Outside Hitter
2018 Women's U19 Volleyball European Championship,
Top Scorer
2019 FIVB Volleyball Women's U20 World Championship,
Fair Play Award
2018 Balkan Volleyball U19 Championship.
