= 2021 FIVB Volleyball Women's Club World Championship =

2021 Women's Club World Championship

Tournament details
- Host country: Turkey
- City: Ankara
- Dates: 15–19 December
- Teams: 6 (from 3 confederations)
- Venue: 1 (in 1 host city)

Final positions
- Champions: (Turkey) VakıfBank İstanbul (4th title)
- Runners-up: (Italy) Imoco Volley Conegliano
- Third place: (Turkey) Fenerbahçe Opet İstanbul
- Fourth place: (Brazil) Itambé Minas

Tournament awards
- MVP: (Sweden) Isabelle Haak
- Best Setter: (Poland) Joanna Wołosz
- Best OH: (Brazil) Gabriela Guimarães (Russia) Arina Fedorovtseva
- Best MB: (Turkey) Zehra Güneş (Netherlands) Robin de Kruijf
- Best OPP: (Sweden) Isabelle Haak
- Best Libero: (Italy) Monica De Gennaro

Tournament statistics
- Matches played: 10
- Attendance: 43,584 (4,358 per match)

The 2021 FIVB Women's Club World Championship was the 14th edition of the tournament. For the first time it was held in Ankara, Turkey from 15 to 19 December. Six teams competed in the tournament, including two wild cards.

== Qualification ==
| Team | Qualified as |
|---|---|
| (Turkey) VakıfBank İstanbul | Hosts |
| (Kazakhstan) Altay VC | 2021 Asian Champions |
| (Italy) Imoco Volley Conegliano | 2020–21 European Champions |
| (Brazil) Dentil Praia Clube | 2021 South American Champions |
| (Brazil) Itambé Minas | Wild Card |
| (Turkey) Fenerbahçe Opet İstanbul | Wild Card |

== Pools composition ==
| Pool A | Pool B |
|---|---|
| (Italy) Imoco Volley Conegliano | (Turkey) VakıfBank İstanbul |
| (Brazil) Dentil Praia Clube | (Brazil) Itambé Minas |
| (Turkey) Fenerbahçe Opet İstanbul | (Kazakhstan) Altay VC |

== Venue ==
All rounds
Ankara, Turkey
Ankara Arena
Capacity: 10,400
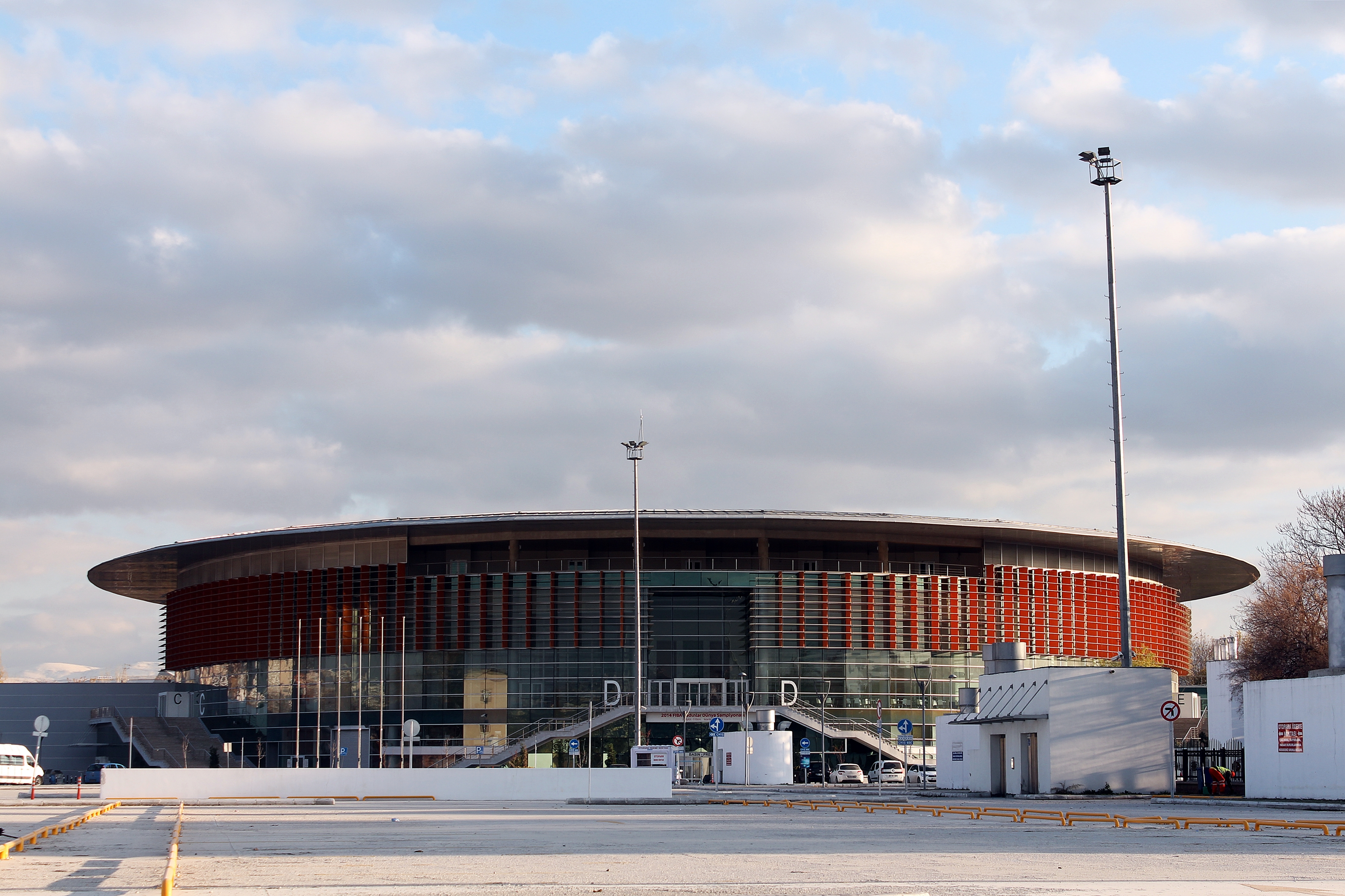

== Pool standing procedure ==
Ranking system:

1. Number of victories
2. Match points
3. Set ratio
4. Point ratio
5. Result of the last match between the tied teams

| Result | Winners | Losers |
|---|---|---|
| 3–0 | 3 points | 0 points |
| 3–1 | 3 points | 0 points |
| 3–2 | 2 points | 1 point |

== Preliminary round ==
- All times are Turkish Time (UTC+03:00).

=== Pool A ===
| Pos | Team | Pld | W | L | Pts | SW | SL | SR | SPW | SPL | SPR | Qualification |
|---|---|---|---|---|---|---|---|---|---|---|---|---|
| 1 | (Italy) Imoco Volley Conegliano | 2 | 2 | 0 | 6 | 6 | 0 | MAX | 150 | 109 | 1.376 | Semifinals |
| 2 | (Turkey) Fenerbahçe Opet İstanbul | 2 | 1 | 1 | 3 | 3 | 4 | 0.750 | 155 | 162 | 0.957 | Semifinals |
| 3 | (Brazil) Dentil Praia Clube | 2 | 0 | 2 | 0 | 1 | 6 | 0.167 | 138 | 172 | 0.802 | |

| Date | Time | | Score | | Set 1 | Set 2 | Set 3 | Set 4 | Set 5 | Total | Report |
|---|---|---|---|---|---|---|---|---|---|---|---|
| 15 Dec | 18:30 | Imoco Volley Conegliano (Italy) | 3–0 | (Turkey) Fenerbahçe Opet İstanbul | 25–12 | 25–23 | 25–23 | | | 75–58 | P2 |
| 16 Dec | 18:30 | Dentil Praia Clube (Brazil) | 1–3 | (Turkey) Fenerbahçe Opet İstanbul | 25–22 | 23–25 | 18–25 | 21–25 | | 87–97 | P2 |
| 17 Dec | 15:00 | Imoco Volley Conegliano (Italy) | 3–0 | (Brazil) Dentil Praia Clube | 25–17 | 25–16 | 25–18 | | | 75–51 | P2 |

=== Pool B ===
| Pos | Team | Pld | W | L | Pts | SW | SL | SR | SPW | SPL | SPR | Qualification |
|---|---|---|---|---|---|---|---|---|---|---|---|---|
| 1 | (Turkey) VakıfBank İstanbul | 2 | 2 | 0 | 6 | 6 | 0 | MAX | 150 | 93 | 1.613 | Semifinals |
| 2 | (Brazil) Itambé Minas | 2 | 1 | 1 | 3 | 3 | 3 | 1.000 | 128 | 135 | 0.948 | Semifinals |
| 3 | (Kazakhstan) Altay VC | 2 | 0 | 2 | 0 | 0 | 6 | 0.000 | 100 | 150 | 0.667 | |

| Date | Time | | Score | | Set 1 | Set 2 | Set 3 | Set 4 | Set 5 | Total | Report |
|---|---|---|---|---|---|---|---|---|---|---|---|
| 15 Dec | 15:00 | Itambé Minas (Brazil) | 3–0 | (Kazakhstan) Altay VC | 25–20 | 25–22 | 25–18 | | | 75–60 | P2 |
| 16 Dec | 15:00 | VakıfBank İstanbul (Turkey) | 3–0 | (Kazakhstan) Altay VC | 25–13 | 25–10 | 25–17 | | | 75–40 | P2 |
| 17 Dec | 18:30 | Itambé Minas (Brazil) | 0–3 | (Turkey) VakıfBank İstanbul | 18–25 | 17–25 | 18–25 | | | 53–75 | P2 |

== Final round ==
- All times are Turkish Time (UTC+03:00).

Semifinals
18 December
(Italy) Conegliano | 3
(Brazil) Minas | 1
18 December
(Turkey) VakıfBank | 3
(Turkey) Fenerbahçe | 0

Final
19 December
(Italy) Conegliano | 2
(Turkey) VakıfBank | 3
3rd place match
19 December
(Brazil) Minas | 0
(Turkey) Fenerbahçe | 3

=== Semifinals ===
| Date | Time | | Score | | Set 1 | Set 2 | Set 3 | Set 4 | Set 5 | Total | Report |
|---|---|---|---|---|---|---|---|---|---|---|---|
| 18 Dec | 15:00 | Imoco Volley Conegliano (Italy) | 3–1 | (Brazil) Itambé Minas | 23–25 | 26–24 | 25–15 | 25–19 | | 99–83 | P2 |
| 18 Dec | 18:30 | VakıfBank İstanbul (Turkey) | 3–0 | (Turkey) Fenerbahçe Opet İstanbul | 25–19 | 29–27 | 25–23 | | | 79–69 | P2 |

=== 3rd place match ===
| Date | Time | | Score | | Set 1 | Set 2 | Set 3 | Set 4 | Set 5 | Total | Report |
|---|---|---|---|---|---|---|---|---|---|---|---|
| 19 Dec | 15:00 | Itambé Minas (Brazil) | 0–3 | (Turkey) Fenerbahçe Opet İstanbul | 18–25 | 7–25 | 26–28 | | | 51–78 | P2 |

=== Final ===
| Date | Time | | Score | | Set 1 | Set 2 | Set 3 | Set 4 | Set 5 | Total | Report |
|---|---|---|---|---|---|---|---|---|---|---|---|
| 19 Dec | 18:30 | Imoco Volley Conegliano (Italy) | 2–3 | (Turkey) VakıfBank İstanbul | 15–25 | 25–22 | 22–25 | 25–22 | 7–15 | 94–109 | P2 |

== Final standing ==
| Rank | Team |
|---|---|
| 1st place, gold medalist(s) | (Turkey) VakıfBank İstanbul |
| 2nd place, silver medalist(s) | (Italy) Imoco Volley Conegliano |
| 3rd place, bronze medalist(s) | (Turkey) Fenerbahçe Opet İstanbul |
| 4 | (Brazil) Itambé Minas |
| 5 | (Brazil) Dentil Praia Clube |
| 6 | (Kazakhstan) Altay VC |

2021 Women's Club World Champions

14–player roster
Buket Gülübay, Cansu Özbay, Tuğba Şenoğlu, Ayça Aykaç, Kübra Akman, Chiaka Ogbogu, Ayse Melis Gürkaynak (c), Gabriela Guimarães, Isabelle Haak, Meryem Boz, Michelle Bartsch-Hackley, Aylin Sarıoğlu, Derya Cebecioğlu, Zehra Güneş
Head coach
Giovanni Guidetti

== Awards ==
- Most valuable player
  (Sweden) Isabelle Haak (VakıfBank İstanbul)
- Best Opposite
  (Sweden) Isabelle Haak (VakıfBank İstanbul)
- Best outside spikers
  (Brazil) Gabriela Guimarães (VakıfBank İstanbul)
  (Russia) Arina Fedorovtseva (Fenerbahçe Opet İstanbul)
- Best middle blockers
  (Turkey) Zehra Güneş (VakıfBank İstanbul)
  (Netherlands) Robin de Kruijf (Imoco Volley Conegliano)
- Best setter
  (Poland) Joanna Wołosz (Imoco Volley Conegliano)
- Best libero
  (Italy) Monica De Gennaro (Imoco Volley Conegliano)

== See also ==
- 2021 FIVB Volleyball Men's Club World Championship
