= Sıla Çalışkan =

Turkish volleyball player (born 1996)

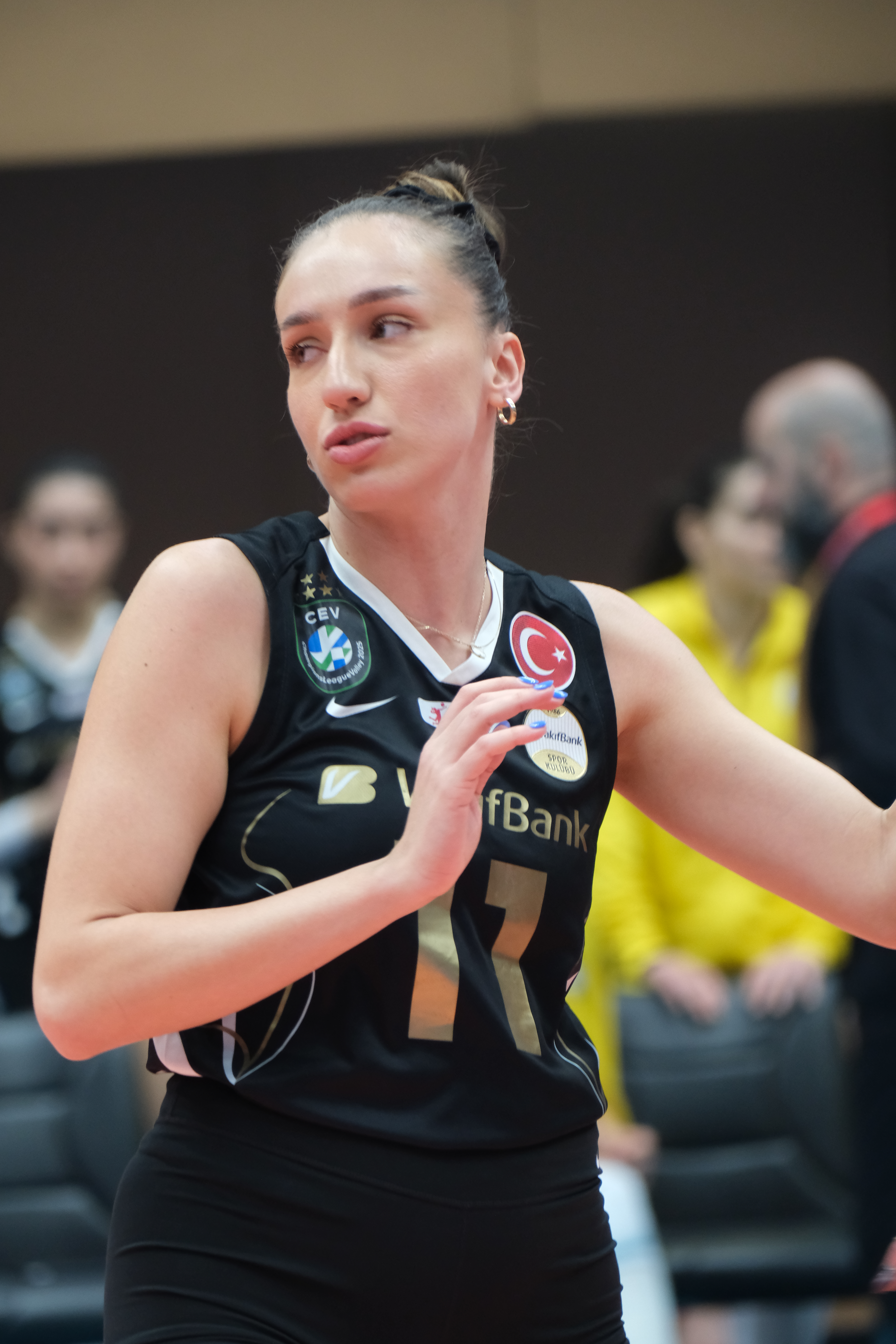
- Sıla Çalışkan of VakıfBank (2025)

Personal information
- Born: 16 December 1996 (age 29); Istanbul, Turkey
- Height: 183 cm (6 ft 0 in)
- Weight: 76 kg (168 lb)
- Spike: 290 cm (114 in)
- Block: 285 cm (112 in)

Volleyball information
- Position: Setter
- Current club: Türk Hava Yolları
- Number: 11

Career
Years
- 2012–2015
- 2016–2017
- 2017–2019
- 2018–2020
- 2020–2021
- 2020–2021
- 2021–2022
- 2022–2023
- 2023–2024
- 2024–2026
- 2026–
Teams
- VakıfBank
- SeramıkSan
- Istanbul Aydın Üniversitesi
- Fenerbahçe
- Çan Gençlik Kale
- Vasas Obuda
- PTT Spor
- Nilüfer Bld.
- Türk Hava Yolları
- VakıfBank
- Türk Hava Yolları
Honours
Women's volleyball
Representing Turkey

Sıla Çalışkan (born 16 December 1996) is a Turkish professional volleyball player. She plays in the setter position for Türk Hava Yolları, and is a member of the Turkey women's national volleyball team.

== Club career ==
Çaloşkan started volleyball playing at the age of ten during sports activities in the primary school. She was encouraged by her physical education teacher to continue with volleyball. Her career began in the youth team of VakıfBank.

After leaving VakıfBank, she played for SeramikSan and İstanbul Aydın Üniversitesi. In June 2018, she transferred to Fenerbahçe. With her team, she enjoyed the third place title of the 2018–19 Turkish Women's Volleyball League season, the runners-up ğosition at the 2018–19 Turkish Women's Volleyball Cupand the thirs place at the 2018–19 CEV Women's Champions League. In May 2020, she signed with the to the Sultans League promoted club Çan Gençlik Kale. In January 2021, she moved to Hungary, and joined the Budapest-based club Vasas Obuda. After returning home, she signed with PTT in Ankara for the 2021–22 Turkish Women's Volleyball League season. The 2022–23 Turkish Women's Volleyball League season, she compleyed at Nilüfer Bld.. In the 2023–24 season, she played for Türk Hava Yolları. She returned to her initial club Vakıfbank in May 2024, and won the 2024–25 Turkish Women's Volleyball League. After leaving VakıfBank, she rejoined her former club Türk Hava Yolları in January 2026.

She plays in the setter position and is 183 cm (6 ft 0 in) tall at 76 kg (168 lb). She is left-handed, has 290 cm (110 in) spike heşight and 295 cm (116 in) block height.

== International career ==
With the Turkey girls' youth team, she won the bronze medal at the Balkan Championships and the silver medal at the President's Cup.

Çalışkan was included in the broad squad of the Turkey women's national volleyball team for participation at the 2025 FIVB Women's Volleyball Nations League.

== Personal life ==
Sıla Çalışkan was born in Istanbul, Turkey on 16 December 1996. She lost her father Vedat Çalışkan, who died in 2025 at the age of 60. She has a sister Selin, who is also a national volleyball player.

== Honours ==
=== Club ===
VakıfBank

Turkish Women's Volleyball League
(gold) (4): 2012– 13 ), 2013–14, 2024–25, 2025–26
(silver) (1): 2014–15

Turkish Women's Volleyball Cup
(gold) (3): 2012–13, 2013–14, 2025–26,
(silver) (1): 2014–15
(bronze) (1): 2024–25

Turkish Women's Volleyball Super Cup
(gold) (1): 2014
(silver) (1): 2026

FIVB Women's Volleyball Club World Championship
(gold) (1): 2013

CEV Women's Champions League
(gold) (2): 2012–13 , 2025–26
(silver) (1): 2013–14
(bronze) (1): 2014–15

Fenerbahçe

Turkish Women's Volleyball League
(bronze) (1): 2018–19

Turkish Women's Volleyball Super Cup
(gold) (1): 2015
CEV Women's Champions League
(bronze) (2): 2018–19

Türk Hava Yolları

Turkish Women's Volleyball Cup
(bronze) (1): 2023–24

Istanbul Aydın Üniversitesi

European Universities Women's Volleyball Championships
(silver) (1): 2018–19

Vasas Obuda

Hungarian Women's Volleyball League
(bronze) (1): 2021

=== International ===
Turkey women's U19

USA Volleyball Cup
(silver) (1): 2022
