= Akbay =

Akbay is a Turkish surname. Notable people with the surname include:

- Bahar Akbay (born 1998), Turkish volleyball player
- Ercan Akbay (born 1959), Turkish writer, painter, and musician
- Ismail Akbay (1930–2003), Turkish scientist who worked for NASA in the United States
- Nihat Akbay (1945–2020), Turkish footballer
