= Ayça Aykaç =

Turkish women's volleyball player (born 1996)

- Aykaç in 2026

Personal information
- Full name: Ayça Aykaç Altıntaş
- Nationality: Turkish
- Born: 27 February 1996 (age 30) İzmir, Turkey
- Height: 175 cm (5 ft 9 in)
- Weight: 62 kg (137 lb)
- Spike: 275 cm (108 in)
- Block: 260 cm (102 in)

Volleyball information
- Position: Libero
- Current club: (Turkey) Galatasaray
- Number: 5

Career
- Years: Team
- 2014–2019: (Turkey) Vakıfbank
- 2019–2020: (Turkey) AtlasGlobal Yeşilyurt
- 2020–2026: (Turkey) Vakıfbank
- 2026–: (Turkey) Galatasaray

National team
- Years: Team
- 2013: Turkey girls' U18
- 2017: Turkey women's U23
- 2020–: Turkey
Honours
Women's volleyball
Representing Turkey
European Championship
| Bronze medal – third place | 2021 Serbia/Bulgaria/Croatia/Romania | Team |
| Gold medal – first place | 2023 Belgium/Italy/Estonia/Germany | Team |
FIVB Nations League
| Bronze medal – third place | 2021 Rimini | Team |
| Gold medal – first place | 2023 Arlington | Team |

Ayça Aykaç (born 27 February 1996) is a Turkish professional volleyball player.

She plays in the libero position for Galatasaray and the Turkey women's national volleyball team.

== Club career ==
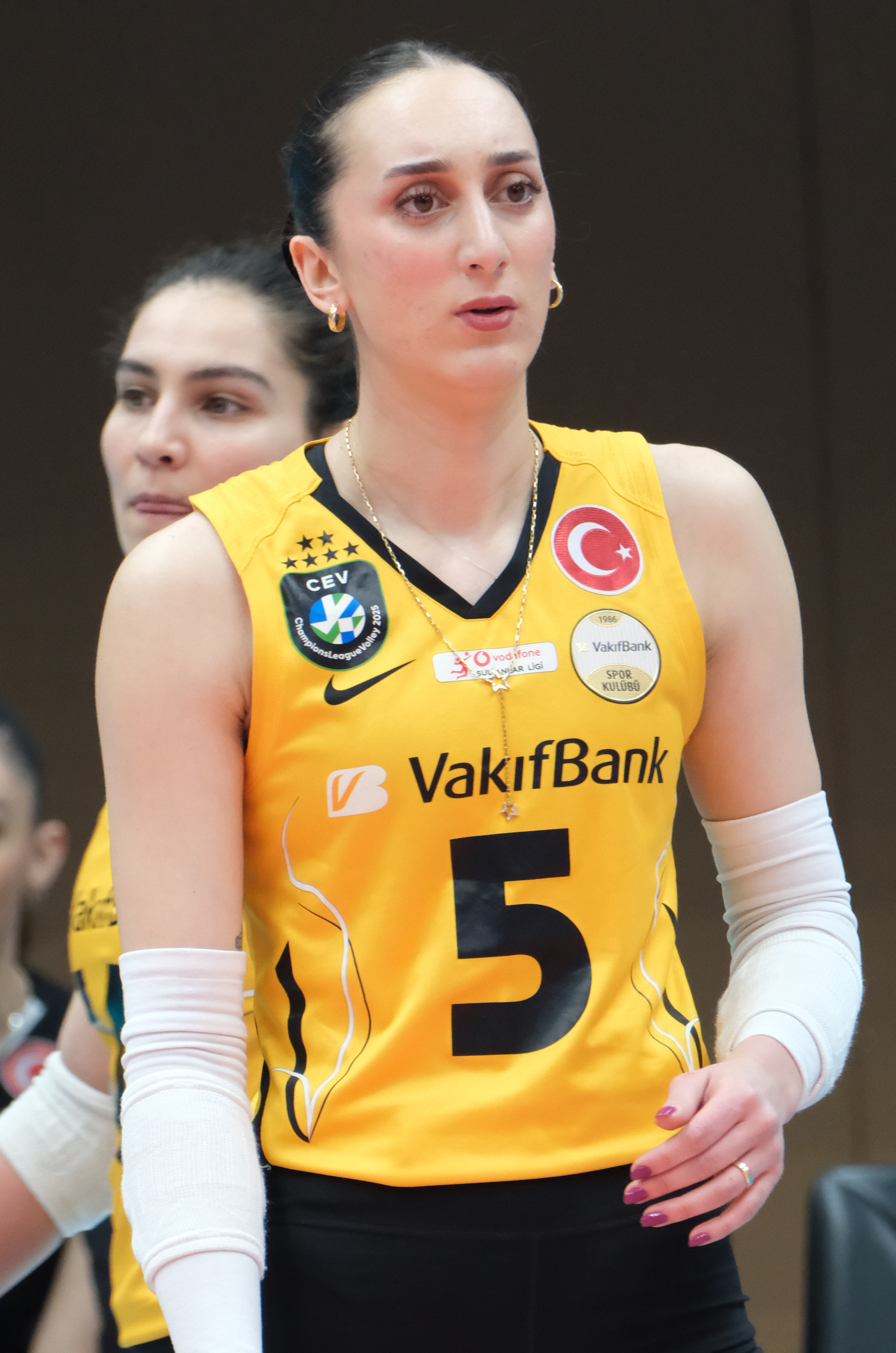
Aykaç in 2025

On July 17, 2026, she signed a 1 + 1 year contract with Galatasaray Daikin.

== Personal life ==
Ayça Aykaç was born in İzmir, Turkey. On 30 September 2023, she married Mert Altıntaş, assistant coach of the Galatasaray S.K. women's volleyball team.

== Honours ==
=== Club ===
Champions (6)

- 2016–17 Turkish Women's Volleyball League (VakıfBank)
- 2017 FIVB Volleyball Women's Club World Championship (VakıfBank)
- 2017–18 Turkish Women's Volleyball League (VakıfBank)
- 2021 FIVB Club World Championship (VakıfBank)
- 2021–22 Turkish Women's Volleyball League (VakıfBank)
- 2021–22 CEV Women's Champions League (VakıfBank)
- 2025–26 CEV Women's Champions League (VakıfBank)

Third places (1)

- 2016 FIVB Volleyball Women's Club World Championship (VakıfBank)

=== National team ===
- 2021 Nations League - Bronze Medal
- 2021 European Championship - Bronze Medal
- 2023 Nations League - Gold Medal
- 2023 European Championship – Gold Medal

=== Individual ===
- 2021–22 CEV Women's Champions League - Best Libero
- 2023 FIVB Volleyball Women's Club World Championship - Best Libero

Awards
| Preceded by (Italy) Monica De Gennaro | Best Libero of Club World Championship; 2023 | Succeeded by TBD |
