= Ayşe Melis Gürkaynak =

Turkish volleyball player (born 1990)

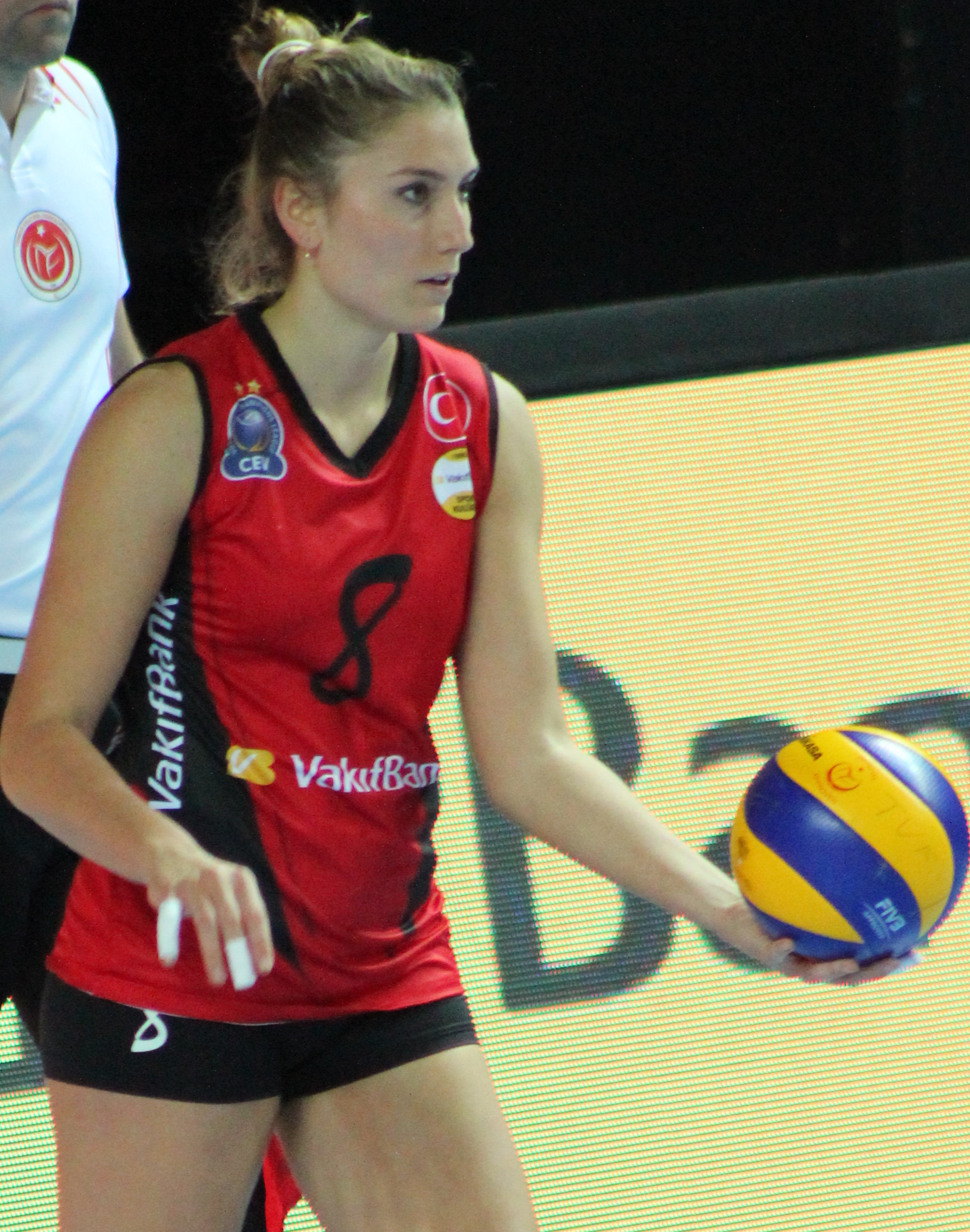

Personal information
- Born: April 20, 1990 (age 36); Ankara, Turkey
- Height: 1.84 m (6 ft 1/2 in)

Volleyball information
- Position: Middle-Blocker
- Current club: Vakıfbank Spor Kulübü
- Number: 8
Honours
Women's volleyball
Representing Turkey
Women's European Volleyball League
Silver medal – second place	2015 Hungary	Team

Ayşe Melis Gürkaynak (born April 20, 1990) is a Turkish volleyball player. She is 184 cm (6.04 ft) tall and plays as a middle blocker. She plays for Vakıfbank Spor Kulübü and wears the number 8.

== Clubs ==
- (Turkey) VakıfBank Güneş Sigorta Türk Telekom (2005-2008)
- (Turkey) Galatasaray Women's Volleyball Team (2008–2009)
- (Turkey) Beşiktaş Women's Volleyball Team (2009–2010)
- (Turkey) VakıfBank Güneş Sigorta Türk Telekom (2010- )

== Awards ==
=== National team ===
- 2015 Women's European Volleyball League – Silver

=== Clubs ===
- 2010–11 CEV Women's Champions League - Champion, with VakıfBank Güneş Sigorta Türk Telekom
- 2011 FIVB Women's Club World Championship - Runner-Up, with VakıfBank Türk Telekom
- 2011-12 Turkish Women's Volleyball League - Runner-Up, with Vakıfbank Spor Kulübü
- 2012-13 Turkish Cup - Champion, with Vakıfbank Spor Kulübü
- 2012–13 CEV Champions League - Champion, with Vakıfbank Spor Kulübü
- 2012-13 Turkish Women's Volleyball League - Champion, with Vakıfbank Spor Kulübü
- 2021–22 CEV Women's Champions League - Champion, with Vakıfbank Spor Kulübü

== See also ==
- Turkish women in sports
