= VakıfBank Sports Palace =

Sports venue in Istanbul, Turkey

- VakıfBank Spor Sarayı
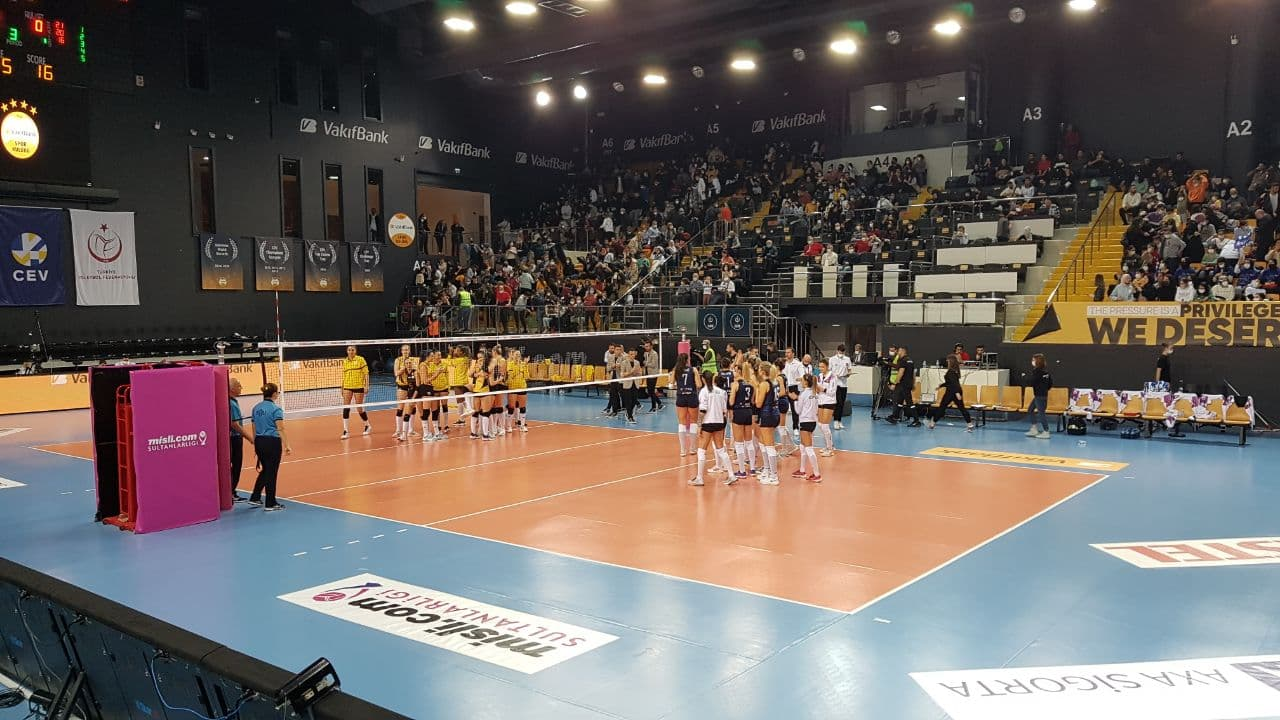
- Volleyball court during a match in December 2021.
- Interactive map of VakıfBank Sports Palace
- Location: Üsküdar, Istanbul, Turkey
- Coordinates: 41°01′31″N 29°02′05″E
- Owner: VakıfBank
- Capacity: 2,900

Construction
- Groundbreaking: June 2015
- Opened: January 2017; 9 years ago

Tenant
- VakıfBank S.K.

VakıfBank Sports Palace (Turkish: VakıfBank Spor Sarayı) is a multi-purpose indoor arena located in Istanbul, Turkey. Built and owned by VakıfBank, it was opened in 2017.

== Overview ==
Situated at Selami Ali Neighborhood, Vakıf Sok. 8 in Bağlarbaşı quarter of Üsküdar District on the Asian part of Istanbul, Turkey, the facility was designed specifically for volleyball. The groundbreaking took place in June 2015, and the facility and opened in January 2017.

The nine-story facility was built by the state-owned bank VakıfBank on a land of 7,260 m^{2} (78,100 sq ft), and covers a total of 30,000 m^{2} (320,000 sq ft). The volleyball court has a seating capacity of 2,900. The facility ncludes also training courts, a gym, physiotherapy rooms, semi-olympic swimming pool, fitness center, meeting rooms, media areas and a cafeteria. There is a covered parking lot for 500 cars. The facility is suitable for disableds.

== Usage ==
The arena regularly hosts matches of the women's volleyball team Vakufbank in the Turkish Women's Volleyball League and European competitions, including the CEV Women's Champions League. Gymnastics exercising girls and boys of age group 4-6, girls and boys of between 4 and 7 years of age from the skills development and educational games branch, volleyball and basketball training girls and boys of age group 8-14, fitness, pilates and zumbaexercising women over 15 years of age, can benefit from the use of the facility free of charge.

== Access ==
The facility's location offers convenient transportation thanks to its proximity to Marmaray,, metrobus, metro and Eurasia Tunnel.

== See also ==
- List of indoor arenas in Turkey
