= VakıfBank S.K. =

Turkish women's volleyball club

VakıfBank SK
- Full name: VakıfBank Spor Kulübü
- Short name: VakıfBank (Legend)
- Founded: 1986
- Ground: VakıfBank Sports Palace (Capacity: 2,900)
- Chairman: Osman Arslan
- Manager: (Italy) Giovanni Guidetti
- Captain: (Turkey) Zehra Güneş
- League: Sultanlar Ligi; CEV Champions League
- 2025–26: Champions
- Website: Club home page
- Championships: 4 World Championships; 7 European Championships; 1 CEV Cup; 1 CEV Challenge Cup; 1 Top Volley International; 15 Turkish Championships; 10 Turkish Cups; 6 Turkish Super Cups

Uniforms
Home	Away

VakıfBank Sports Club (Turkish: VakıfBank Spor Kulübü) is a Turkish professional volleyball club based in Istanbul, Turkey. Founded in 1986, VakıfBank SK is currently one of the best women's volleyball teams in the world, having won the FIVB Volleyball Women's Club World Championship a record four times and the European Champions League seven times to date.

From 23 October 2012 to 22 January 2014, the team held a 73-game winning streak in all official domestic and international competitions, which was acknowledged as a world record by Guinness World Records. The club won all 52 official games played during the 2012–13 season and all 51 official games played in 2013. VakıfBank collected all five championship trophies unbeaten in the 2012–13 season, being the only club in volleyball history to have achieved this unparalleled feat.

== History ==
The team was established following a merger between two separate teams: VakıfBank and Güneş Sigorta. VakıfBank were originally an Ankara-based team but moved to Istanbul after the merger. Their name changed to VakıfBank Güneş Sigorta, VakıfBank Güneş Sigorta Türk Telekom (VGSTT), VakıfBank Türk Telekom and VakıfBank respectively.

VakıfBank won three unbeaten CEV Champions League championships in 2011, 2013, 2017 and 2018, and are the only unbeaten champions in European Champions League history. They also placed second in 1998 and 1999 in this competition. They won the 2013, 2017, 2018 and 2021 Club World Championship, the CEV Top Teams Cup in 2004 and CEV Challenge Cup in 2008 while finishing second in the FIVB Volleyball Women's Club World Championship in 2011 and third in the European Confederation Cup of 2000.

The team is coached by Italian Giovanni Guidetti since 2008. VakıfBank won 47 games of 47 in the 2012–13 season in all competitions including the European Champions League (12 games), Turkish League (29 games), and Turkish Cup (6 games). After that season, they kept most of the players and coaching staff for the 2013–14 season with little changes: Jelena Nikolic, who took a break volleyball for one year, came back to the team and Italian international Carolina Costagrande transfers from Chinese club Guangdong Evergrande V.C. instead of Polish spiker Malgorzata Glinka and Japanese Saori Kimura. Glinka left the team after three great seasons and moved to her home country for familial reasons.

From 23 October 2012 to 22 January 2014, VakıfBank won 73 consecutive victories in all official competitions, which was acknowledged as a world record by Guinness World Records. During this feat the team won an unprecedented 5 trophies including the Club World Championship, European Champions League, and the domestic treble consisting of the Turkish National League, Turkish Cup and Turkish Super Cup. Their streak was finally ended on 27 January 2014 in a game against rivals Fenerbahçe.

== Venue ==
Since 2016, the club has played home matches at the VakıfBank Sports Palace (Turkish: VakıfBank Spor Sarayı) in Istanbul. The venue has a capacity of 2,900 spectators.

== Current roster ==
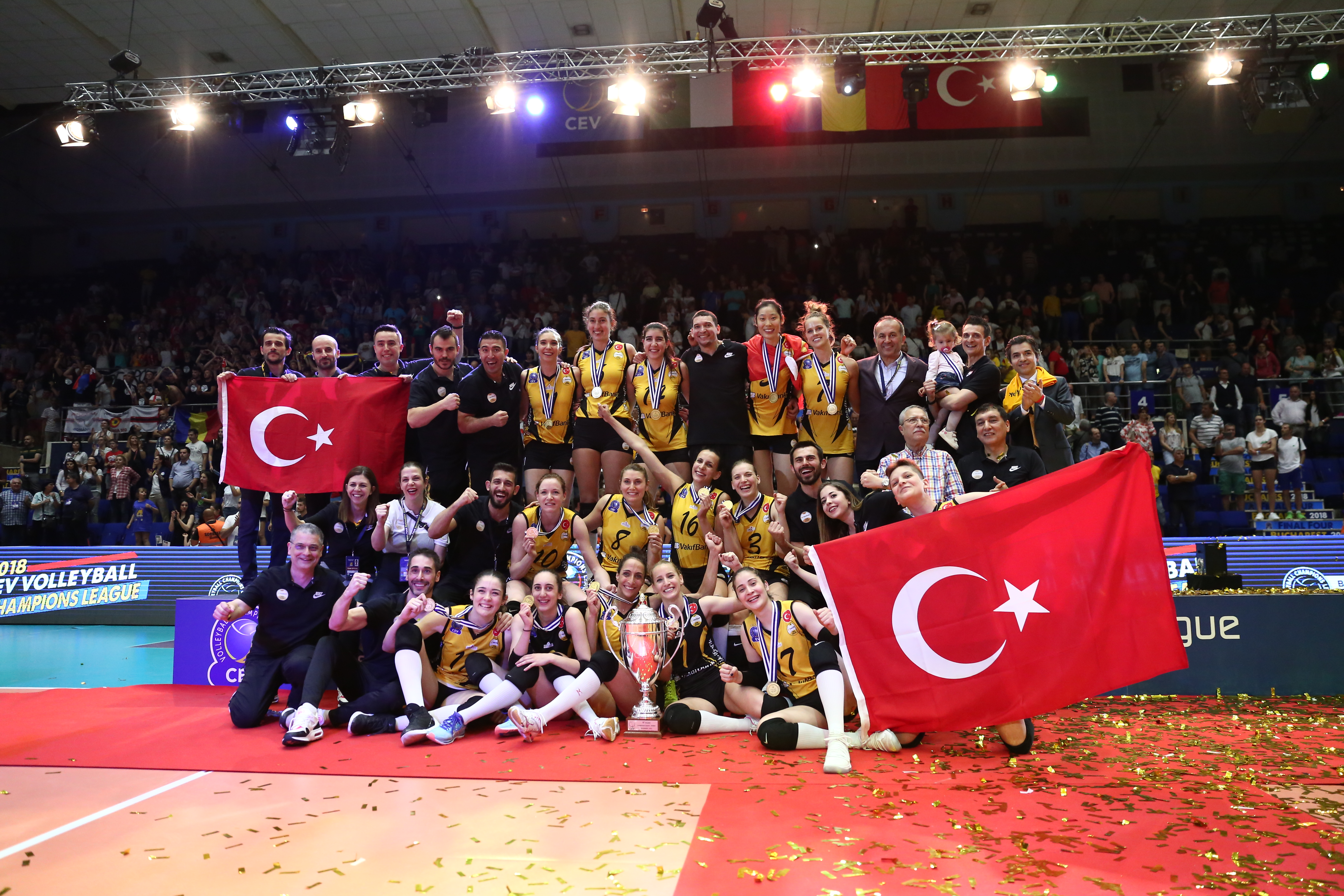
VakıfBank S.K. is one of the best women's volleyball teams in the world, having won the FIVB World Championship four times and the CEV Champions Cup seven times.

VakifBank S.K. for season 2026/2027.

No.	Player	Date of birth	Height (m)	Position	Country
1	Héléna Cazaute	17 December 1997	1.87	Outside hitter	France
3	Cansu Özbay	17 October 1996	1.82	Setter	Turkey
10	Eylül Yatgın	1 October 1999	1.73	Libero	Turkey
6	Berka Buse Özden	16 April 2004	1.87	Middle Blocker	Turkey
7	Aylin Uysalcan	13 July 2009	1.96	Outside hitter	Turkey
11	Naz Aydemir Akyol	14 August 1990	1.86	Setter	Turkey
14	Aleksandra Jegdić	9 October 1994	1.67	Libero	Serbia
15	Deniz Uyanık	25 June 2001	1.95	Middle blocker	Turkey
16	Aylin Sarıoğlu	21 July 1995	1.68	Libero	Turkey
18	Zehra Güneş (c)	7 July 1999	1.98	Middle blocker	Turkey
19	Tijana Bošković	8 March 1997	1.94	Opposite	Serbia
91	Emily Maglio	13 November 1996	1.91	Middle Blocker	Canada
23	Marina Markova	27 January 2001	1.99	Outside hitter	Russia
24	Katarina Dangubić	12 September 1999	1.85	Outside hitter	Serbia
25	Monika Brancuská	19 November 2004	1.88	Opposite	Czech Republic
22	Vanja Ivanović	22 October 2004	1.87	Outside hitter	Serbia

== Honours ==
=== International competitions ===
- FIVB Volleyball Women's Club World Championship
  - Winners (4): 2013, 2017, 2018, 2021
  - Runners-up (3): 2011, 2022, 2023
  - Third place (3): 2006, 2016, 2019
- CEV Champions League
  - Winners (7): 2010–11, 2012–13, 2016–17, 2017–18, 2021–22, 2022–23, 2025–26
  - Runners-up (5): 1998, 1999, 2013–14, 2015–16, 2020–21
  - Third place (2): 2014–15, 2018-19
- CEV Cup
  - Winners (1): 2004
  - Third place (1): 2000
- CEV Challenge Cup
  - Winners (1): 2008
  - Third place (2): 1991, 1992
- Women's Top Volley International
  - Winners (1): 2008

=== Domestic competitions ===
- Turkish Women's Volleyball League
  - Winners (15): 1992, 1993, 1997, 1998, 2004, 2005, 2013, 2014, 2016, 2018, 2019, 2021, 2022, 2025, 2026
  - Runners-up (12): 1995, 1999, 2000, 2001, 2002, 2003, 2006, 2009, 2010, 2011, 2012, 2015
  - Third place (8): 1991, 1993, 1997, 1999, 2000, 2017, 2023, 2024
- Turkish Cup
  - Winners (10): 1995, 1997, 1998, 2013, 2014, 2018, 2021, 2022, 2023, 2026
  - Runners-up (5): 2000, 2001, 2010, 2015, 2017
  - Third place (5): 2011, 2012, 2019, 2024, 2025
- Turkish Super Cup
  - Winners (6): 2013, 2014, 2017, 2021, 2023, 2026
  - Runners-up (7): 2010, 2015, 2018, 2019, 2020, 2022, 2025

== Season by season ==
Season	League	Pos.	Turkish Cup	Turkish Super Cup	European competitions		Worldwide competitions	
2015–16	TWVL	1st		RU	CEV Champions League	RU	FIVB Women's CWC	
2016–17	TWVL	3rd	RU		CEV Champions League	C	FIVB Women's CWC	3rd
2017–18	TWVL	1st	C	C	CEV Champions League	C	FIVB Women's CWC	C
2018–19	TWVL	1st	3rd	RU	CEV Champions League	3rd	FIVB Women's CWC	C
2019–20	TWVL			RU	CEV Champions League		FIVB Women's CWC	C
2020–21	TWVL	1st	C	RU	CEV Champions League	RU		
2021–22	TWVL	1st	C	C	CEV Champions League	C	FIVB Women's CWC	C
2022–23	TWVL	3rd	C	RU	CEV Champions League	C	FIVB Women's CWC	RU
2023–24	TWVL	3rd		C	CEV Champions League		FIVB Women's CWC	RU
2024–25	TWVL	1st	3rd		CEV Champions League	4th		
2025–26	TWVL	1st	C	RU	CEV Champions League	C		

== Previous names ==
- 1986–1999: Güneş Sigorta
- 1999–2009: VakıfBank Güneş Sigorta
- 2009–2011: VakıfBank Güneş Sigorta Türk Telekom
- 2011–2012: VakıfBank Türk Telekom
- 2012–present: VakıfBank

== Notable players ==
Criteria

To appear in this section a player must have either:

- Played at least one season for the club.
- Set a club record or won an individual award while at the club.
- Played at least one official international match for their national team at any time.
- To perform very successfully during period in the club or at later/previous stages of her career.

Domestic Players

Turkey

- Hülya Cömert (1998-2000)
- Özlem Özçelik (1990-1993)
- Necla Esepaşa Güçlü (1990-2000/2000-2006)
- Pelin Yüce Falay (1996-1997/1998-2000/2000-2003)
- Sonay Gülergin (1997-1998)
- Çiğdem Can Rasna (1994-1998)
- Bahar Mert Üçoklar (1994-2000)
- Esra Gümüş (1999-2000)
- Nihan Güneyligil (1998-1999/2006-2009)
- Nedime Elif Yarar (2001-2009)
- Deniz Hakyemez (2005-2009)
- Neslihan Demir (2002–2006/2008–2010)
- Naz Aydemir Akyol (2012–2018/2026-)
- Polen Uslupehlivan (2008–2010/2012–2014)
- Arzu Göllü (2007–2010)
- Özge Kırdar Çemberci (2008–2012)
- Gözde Kırdar Sonsırma (2010–2018)
- Nilay Özdemir (2009–2012)
- Elif Ağca Öner (2001–2007/2008–2009)
- Gizem Güreşen (2009–2015)
- Bahar Toksoy (2007–2015)
- Seda Aslanyürek (2015-2016)
- Ergül Avcı (2011–2013)
- Aysun Özbek (1996–2008)
- Güldeniz Önal (2008–2015)
- Ebrar Karakurt (2016–2020)
- Meliha İsmailoğlu (2019–2021)
- Gizem Örge (2013–2021)
- Gözde Yılmaz (2019–2021)
- Tuğba Şenoğlu (2013-15/2017-18/2020-22)
- Sıla Çalışkan (2012-2015/2025-2026)
- Kübra Akman (2013-2023)
- Ayça Aykaç (2014-2019/2020-2026)
- Zehra Güneş (2017-)
- Aylin Sarıoğlu (2021-)
- Cansu Özbay (2016-)
- Buket Gülübay (2016-2019/2021-2023)
- Karmen Aksoy (2021-2022/2023-2024)
- Alexia Căruțașu (2022-2024)
- Bahar Akbay (2022-2025)
- İdil Naz Başcan (2023-2024)
- Zeynep Sude Demirel (2023-2024)
- Eylül Yatgın (2026-)
- Deniz Uyanık (2024-)
- Berka Buse Özden (2025-)
- Derya Cebecioğlu (2018-19/2021-23/2023-26)
- Ayşe Melis Gürkaynak (2005-2008/2010-2014/2015-2022)
- Meryem Boz (2021-2022)
- Nehir Kurtulan (2025-2026)
- Selin Adalı (2020-2021/2021-2022)
- Nazlı Eda Kafkas (2020-2021)
- Pınar Atasever (2019-2020)
- İlayda Naz Gergef (2024-2025)
- Selin Yener (2024-2025/2025-2026/2026-2027)
- Aylin Uysalcan (2025-)
- Begüm Kaçmaz (2023-2024)
- Melis Durul (2016-2017/2017-2018)
- Cansu Çetin (2015-2016/2016-2017)
- Beren Karslı (2017-2018/2018-2019)
- Özge Nur Çetiner (2016-2017)
- Çağla Akın (2010-2011/2011-2012/2013-2014/2015-2016)
- Ceren Kapucu (2011-2012/2014-2015)
- Pelin Aroğuz (2014-2015)
- Tuğçe Hocaoğlu Coşkun (2012-2013)
- Dilek Kınık (2012-2013)
- Ceyda Aktaş (2011-2012)
- Songül Dikmen (2011-2012)
- Seray Altay (2010-2011)
- Bahanur Şahin Gökalp (2007-2009, 2010-2011)
- Tuğçe Ergenç (2009-2010/2010-2011)
- Ceyda Demirhan Mertoğlu (2010-2011)
- Duygu Bal (2007-2008/2009-2010)
- Serpil Ersari (2008-2009/2009-2010)
- Serenat Şiir Yaz (2008-2009)
- Nihal Yeşil (2008-2009)
- Ceren Mengüç (2007-2008)
- Ebru Elhan (2003-2004/2006-2007)
- İpek Soroğlu Ercan (2003-2004/2006-2007)
- Zeynep Seda Uslu (1999-2000/2002-2003/2004-2005)
- Yasemin Alpullu (1998-2000/2003-2005)
- Ferda Bulut (2002-2003)
- Burçin Fertelli (1999-2000/2000-2003)
- Aycan Kara (1990-1992/2001-2002)
- Banu Toktamış (1998-2000/2000-2002)
- Pelin Çelik (1997-2001)
- Mesude Atılgan (1998-2000/2000-2001)
- Gamze Ergin (2000-2001)
- Zeycan Acar (1988-1993/1999-2000)
- Ayşe Halıcıoğlu (1998-2000)
- Fatma Duygu Sipahioğlu (1996-2000)
- Tatyana Ivannovna Şenel (1995-2000)
- Ebru Algür (1998-1999)
- Izolda Körfez (1994-1999)
- Aysun Evren (1996-1997)
- Nuray Kılıç (1995-1997)
- Nalan Ural (1995-1997)
- Ebru Işık (1992-1996)
- Deniz Emen (1993-1995)
- Emel Taner (1992-1994)
- Zeynep Çelikcan (1992-1993)
- Macide Top Özbey (1992-1995/1990-1992)
- Arzu Savaş (1990-1991)
- Güzin Teksoy (1988-1990)
- Banu Can Schürmann (1998-2000)
- Serap Tunçel (1996-1997/1999-2000)
- Tülin Altıntaş (1999-2000)
- Tuba Meto Kepenek (1990-1994/1998-1999)
- Çiğdem Gökoğlu (1998-1999)
- Müyesser Berk (1994-1995/1997-1999)
- Victoria Sancak (1991-1992/1997-1999)
- Hande Yaşayan (1997-1999)
- Aslı Üçkaleler (1998-1999)
- Ayşen Mete (1996-1998)
- Aylin Kartaltepe (1995-1997)
- Banu Karatekin (1995-1997)
- Aysun Hanif Karatekin (1990-1993/1995-1997)
- Aylin Özbeçetek (1994-1996)
- Melis Esinduy (1994-1995)
- İdil Ulusoy (1992-1994)
- Filiz Bayram (1992-1993)
- Melek Kocaimamoğlu (1990-1992)
- Gamze Adanır (1986-1990)

Non-Domestic European Players

Belarus

- Nataliya Novikova (1996-1997)

Azerbaijan

- Alla Hasanova (1995-1999)
- Yelena Shabovta (1994-1995/1996-1997/2002-2003)

Finland

- Riikka Lehtonen (2007-2008)

Ukraine

- Iryna Komisarova (1998-2000/2000-2002/2005-2006)
- Olena Ustymenko Sokolowski (2011-2012)
- Olena Hasukha (2004-2005/2007-2008)
- Oksana Kotelnikova (1999-2000/2000-2001/2006-2007)
- Tetyana Ivanyushkyna (2003-2004/2004-2005)
- Olena Turkula (2004-2005)
- Olga Kostina (1999-2000/2000-2001/2002-2003/2003-2004)
- Olena Shvets (2003-2004)
- Yuliya Svistina (2000-2001/2001-2002)
- Ganna Taci (1998-1999)
- Alla Kravets (1997-1998)
- Hanna Solovyova (2006-2007)
- Olha Kolomiyets (1999-2000)

Bulgaria

- Elitsa Vasileva (2014–2015)
- Nadezhda Shopova (2006-2007)
- Antonina Zetova (1996-1997/1997-1998)

Croatia

- Maja Poljak (2009–2011)

France

- Victoria Ravva (1993-1994/1994-1995)
- Kinga Maculewicz (2008–2010)
- Héléna Cazaute (2025-)

Germany

- Nancy Celis (1998-1999)
- Sylvia Roll (2007–2008)
- Angelina Grün (2008–2009)
- Christiane Fürst (2011–2014)

Netherlands

- Debby Stam (2009–2010)
- Robin de Kruijf (2014–2016)
- Anne Buijs (2015–2016)
- Lonneke Slöetjes (2015–2019)
- Nika Daalderop (2022–2023)
- Sarah van Aalen (2023-2024)

Italy

- Carolina Costagrande (2013–2015)
- Chiara Di Iulio (2018-2019)
- Paola Egonu (2022–2023)
- Caterina Bosetti (2024-2025)
- Adhuoljok Malual (2025-2026)

Poland

- Małgorzata Glinka-Mogentale (2010–2013)
- Marta Solipiwko (2005-2006)

Russia

- Irina Shcherbakova (1991-1992)
- Svetlana Shakhova (1992-1993)
- Olga Krivosheeva (1988-1989/1992-1993)
- Anna Pligunova (1996-1997)
- Olesya Karalyus (1997-1998)
- Yuliya Svistina (2001–2002)
- Nadezhda Shopova (2001–2002)
- Marina Markova (2024-)

Serbia

- Branka Sekulic (2000-2001)
- Jelena Nikolić (2008–2012/2013–2014)
- Jovana Brakočević (2012–2014)
- Milena Rašić (2014–2021)
- Maja Ognjenović (2019–2021)
- Bianka Buša (2023-2024)
- Tijana Bošković (2025-)
- Katarina Lazović (2025-)
- Vanja Ivanović (2026-)
- Aleksandra Jegdić (2025-)

Czech Republic

- Lucie Václavíková Růžková (1991-1992)
- Gabriela Orvošová (2025–2026)
- Monika Brancuská (2026-)

Sweden

- Angelica Ljungquist (1998-1999)
- Isabelle Haak (2019–2022)

Non-European Players

Dominican Republic

- Annerys Vargas (2007–2008)

Brazil

- Hilma Caldeira (1999–2002)
- Marcia Fu (1999–2000)
- Tatiana Alves Dos Santos (2005–2006)
- Nikolle Del Rio Correa (2006–2007)
- Sheilla Castro (2014–2016)
- Gabriela Guimarães (2019–2024)
- Lorenne Teixeira (2025-2026)

Canada

- Kiera Van Ryk (2024-2025)
- Emily Maglio (2026-)

China

- Pan Wenli (2001–2002)
- Zhu Ting (2016–2019)
- Yuan Xinyue (2024-2025)

Japan

- Saori Kimura (2012–2013)

United States

- Elaine Youngs (1997-1998)
- Kimberly Hill (2015–2017)
- Kelsey Robinson (2017–2019)
- Michelle Bartsch-Hackley (2019–2021)
- Chiaka Ogbogu (2020–2024/2025-2026)
- Kara Bajema (2022–2023)
- Alexandra Frantti (2023-2025)
- Jordan Thompson (2023-2024)
- Kendall Kipp (2024-2025)

Players written in italic still play for the club.

== See also ==
- Turkey women's national volleyball team
- Turkish women in sports
- Perfect season#Volleyball
- VakıfBank
