= Bahar Akbay =

Turkish volleyball player (born 1998)

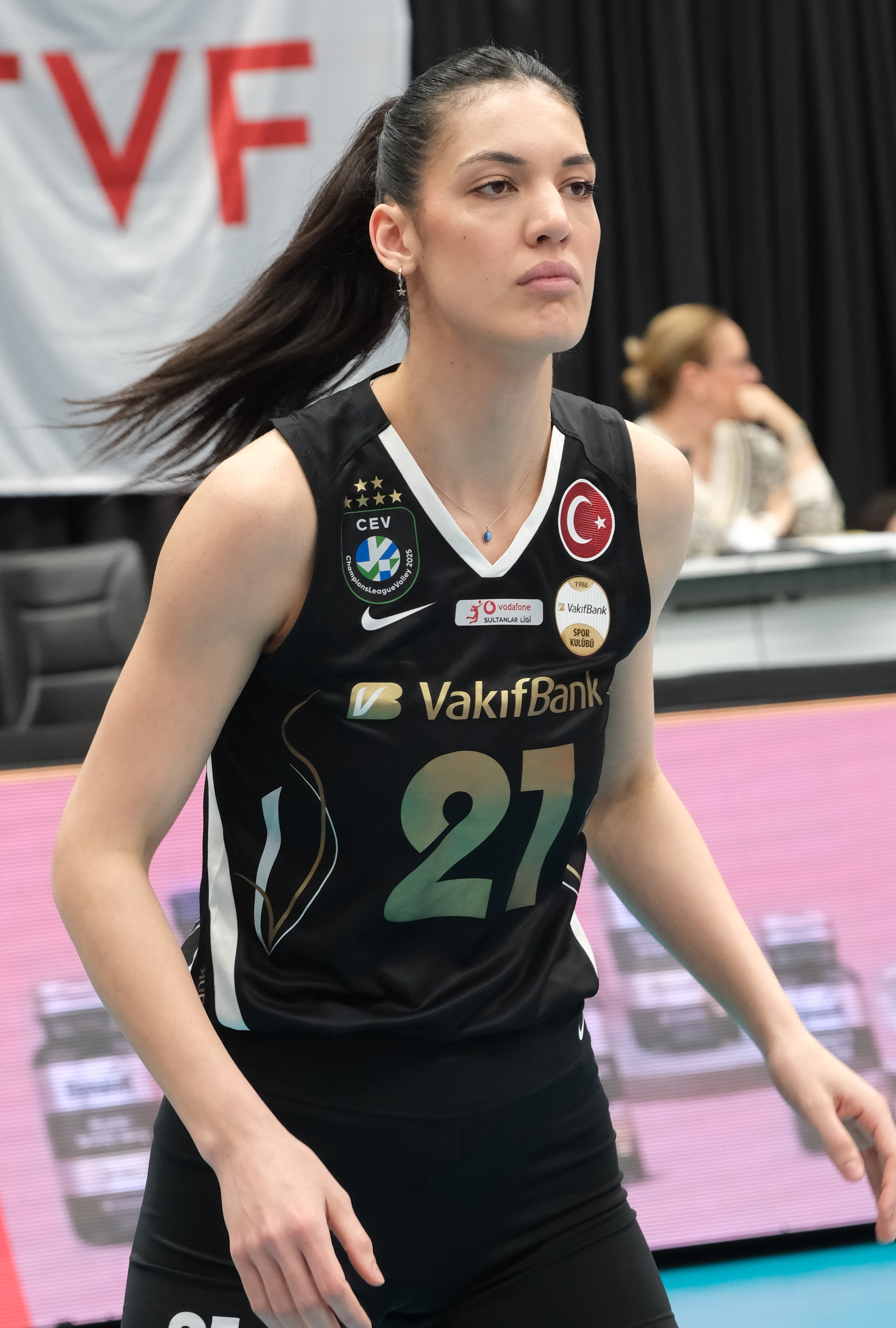
- Bahar Akbay of VakıfBank (2025)

Personal information
- Born: 21 January 1998 (age 28); Muğla, Turkey
- Height: 196 cm (6 ft 5 in)
- Weight: 75 kg (165 lb)
- Spike: 315 cm (124 in)
- Block: 310 cm (122 in)

Volleyball information
- Position: Middle blocker
- Current club: Türk Hava Yolları
- Number: 20

Career
Years
- 2016–2017
- 2017–2018
- 2018–2020
- 2020–2022
- 2022–2025
- 2025–
Teams
- Beylikdüzü Voleybol İhtisas
- Bahçelievler Voleybol
- Beylikdüzü Voleybol İhtisas
- PTT Spor
- VakıfBank
- Türk Hava Yolları
Honours
Women's volleyball
Representing Turkey

Bahar Akbay (born 21 January 1998) is a Turkish professional volleyball player. She plays in the middle blocker position for Türk Hava Yolları, and is a member of the Turkey women's national volleyball team.

== Club career ==
Akbay started her volleyball playing career in the youth team of Beylikdüzü Voleybol İhtisas in Istanbul. Her team became champion in the 2016–17 season of the Turkish Women's Volleyball First League, and was promoted to the Turlish Women's Volleyball League for the 17–18 season. In July 2017, she left her club and joined Bahçelievler Voleybol, which had newly entered the Women's First League. After one season, she returned to her initial club Beylikdüzü Voleybol İhtisas. After the 2020–21 season, she transferred to PTT Spor in Ankara. In June 2022, she joined VakıfBank. She took the runners-up title of the 2022 FIVB Women's Volleyball Club World Championship held in Antalya, Turkey. She wone the champions title of the 2024–25 Turkish Women's Volleyball League season with VakıfBank. She left VakıfBank in May 2025 after playin three seasons for the team. She was with Türk Hava Yolları in the 2025–26 Turkish Women's Volleyball League season.

Akbay plays in the middle blocker position, and is 196 cm (6 ft 5 in) tall at 75 kg (165 lb). She has 315 cm (124 in) spike and 305 cm (120 in) block height.

== International career ==
Akbay was part of the Turkey women's national volleyball team at the 2022 FIVB Women's Volleyball Nations League. She was called up to the broad squad of the national team for participation at the 2025 FIVB Women's Volleyball Nations League.

== Personal life ==
Bahar Akbay was born in Muğla, southwestern Turkey on 21 January 1998.

== Honours ==
=== Club ===
VakıfBank

Turkish Women's Volleyball League
(gold) (1): 2024–25
(bronze) (2): 2022–23, 2023–24

Turkish Women's Volleyball Cup
(gold) (1): 2022–23,
(bronze) (2): 2023–24, 2024–25

Turkish Women's Volleyball Super Cup
(gold) (1): 2024
(silver) (1): 2023

FIVB Women's Volleyball Club World Championship
(silver) (2): 2023, 2024

CEV Women's Champions League
(gold) (1): 2022–23

Beylikdüzü Voleybol İhtisas

Turkish Women's Volleyball First League
(gold) (1): 2016–17
