= 2018–19 CEV Women's Champions League =

- League: CEV Women's Champions League
- Sport: Volleyball
- Duration: Qualifying round: 9 October – 13 November 2018; Main tournament: 20 November 2018 – 18 May 2019
- Teams: 27 (9 qual. + 18 main tourn.)
- Finals champions: (Italy) Igor Gorgonzola Novara
- Runners-up: (Italy) Imoco Volley Conegliano
- Finals MVP: (Italy) Paola Egonu

CEV Women's Champions League seasons
- ← 2017–18 2019–20 →

The 2018–19 CEV Champions League was the highest level of European club volleyball in the 2018–19 season and the 59th edition.

== Qualification ==
A total of 20 teams participate in the main competition, with 18 teams being allocated direct vacancies on the basis of ranking list for European Cups Competitions and 2 teams qualify from the qualification rounds. Drawing of lots for the pools composition was held on 2 November 2018.

Rank	Country	No. teams			Qualified teams
Rank	Country	Vac	Qual	Total	Qualified teams
1	Turkey	3	-	3	Eczacıbaşı VitrA Istanbul
1	Turkey	3	-	3	Fenerbahçe SK Istanbul
1	Turkey	3	-	3	Vakıfbank Istanbul
2	Italy	3	-	3	Igor Gorgonzola Novara
2	Italy	3	-	3	Imoco Volley Conegliano
2	Italy	3	-	3	Savino Del Bene Scandicci
3	Russia	3	-	3	Dinamo Kazan
3	Russia	3	-	3	Dinamo Moscow
3	Russia	3	-	3	Uralochka-NTMK Ekaterinburg
4	Poland	2	1	3	Chemik Police
4	Poland	2	1	3	ŁKS Commercecon Łódź
4	Poland	2	1	3	Budowlani Łódź
6	France	2	-	2	Béziers VB
6	France	2	-	2	RC Cannes
8	Romania	1	-	1	CSM București
9	Germany	1	1	2	SSC Palmberg Schwerin
9	Germany	1	1	2	Allianz MTV Stuttgart
13	Belarus	1	-	1	Minchanka Minsk
14	Bulgaria	1	-	1	Maritza Plovdiv
15	Finland	1	-	1	Hämeenlinna

== Format ==
League round

A round-robin format (each team plays every other team in its pool twice, once home and once away) where the 20 participating teams are drawn into 5 pools of 4 teams each. The five pool winners and the best three second placed teams among all pools qualify for the Playoffs.

The standings is determined by the number of matches won. In case of a tie in the number of matches won by two or more teams, their ranking is based on the following criteria:

- result points (points awarded for results: 3 points for 3–0 or 3–1 wins, 2 points for 3–2 win, 1 point for 2–3 loss);
- set quotient (the number of total sets won divided by the number of total sets lost);
- points quotient (the number of total points scored divided by the number of total points lost);
- results of head-to-head matches between the teams in question.

Playoffs

A knockout format where the 8 qualified teams are each draw into the quarter-finals with the round winners advancing to the next rounds (semifinals and final). Matches in the quarter-finals and semifinals consists of two legs (home and away).
Result points are awarded for each leg (3 points for 3–0 or 3–1 wins, 2 points for 3–2 win, 1 point for 2–3 loss). After two legs, the team with the most result points advances further in the tournament. In case teams are tied after two legs, a Golden Set is played immediately at the completion of the second leg. The Golden Set winner is the team that first obtains 15 points, provided that the points difference between the two teams is at least 2 points (thus, the Golden Set is similar to a tiebreak set in a normal match).

Grand finale

A single match between the winners of the semifinals in a neutral venue decides the tournament champion.

== Pools composition ==
Drawing of lots was held on 2 November 2018, the 20 teams are divided in 4 pots of 5 teams each, with one team per pot being draw into each of the 5 pools (A, B, C, D, E).

Pot 1	Pot 2	Pot 3	Pot 4
Vakıfbank Istanbul (Turkey 1); Imoco Volley Conegliano (Italy 1); Dinamo Moscow (Russia 1); Eczacıbaşı VitrA Istanbul (Turkey 2); Igor Gorgonzola Novara (Italy 2)	Chemik Police (Poland 1); Béziers VB (France 1); Dinamo Kazan (Russia 2); ŁKS Commercecon Łódź (Poland 2); RC Cannes (France 2)	CSM București (Romania 1); SSC Palmberg Schwerin (Germany 1); Minchanka Minsk (Belarus 1); Maritza Plovdiv (Bulgaria 1); Hämeenlinna (Finland 1)	Fenerbahçe SK Istanbul (Turkey 3); Savino Del Bene Scandicci (Italy 3); Uralochka-NTMK Ekaterinburg (Russia 3); Allianz MTV Stuttgart (Germany 2); Budowlani Łódź (Poland 3)

Draw

Pool A	Pool B	Pool C	Pool D	Pool E
Vakıfbank Istanbul	Eczacıbaşı VitrA Istanbul	Igor Gorgonzola Novara	Imoco Volley Conegliano	Dinamo Moscow
Béziers VB	Dinamo Kazan	RC Cannes	ŁKS Commercecon Łódź	Chemik Police
Maritza Plovdiv	Hämeenlinna	Minchanka Minsk	SSC Palmberg Schwerin	CSM București
Allianz MTV Stuttgart	Uralochka-NTMK Ekaterinburg	Budowlani Łódź	Savino Del Bene Scandicci	Fenerbahçe SK Istanbul

== League round ==
The league round started on 20 November 2018.

- All times are local.

=== Pool A ===
Pos	Team	Pld	W	L	Pts	SW	SL	SR	SPW	SPL	SPR	Qualification
1	(Turkey) Vakıfbank Istanbul	6	6	0	18	18	1	18.000	471	342	1.377	Playoff round
2	(Germany) Allianz MTV Stuttgart	6	4	2	12	13	8	1.625	479	447	1.072	Playoff round
3	(Bulgaria) Maritza Plovdiv	6	1	5	3	5	16	0.313	421	492	0.856	
4	(France) Béziers VB	6	1	5	3	4	15	0.267	354	444	0.797	

Date	Time		Score		Set 1	Set 2	Set 3	Set 4	Set 5	Total	Report
20 Nov	20:00	Béziers VB (France)	3–0	(Bulgaria) Maritza Plovdiv	25–17	25–12	25–20			75–49	Report
22 Nov	19:00	Vakıfbank Istanbul (Turkey)	3–1	(Germany) Allianz MTV Stuttgart	25–13	20–25	25–19	25–17		95–74	Report
19 Dec	19:00	Allianz MTV Stuttgart (Germany)	3–0	(France) Béziers VB	25–16	25–16	25–20			75–52	Report
20 Dec	18:00	Maritza Plovdiv (Bulgaria)	0–3	(Turkey) Vakıfbank Istanbul	16–25	16–25	21–25			53–75	Report
23 Jan	19:00	Allianz MTV Stuttgart (Germany)	3–1	(Bulgaria) Maritza Plovdiv	25–15	25–21	23–25	25–19		98–80	Report
23 Jan	20:00	Béziers VB (France)	0–3	(Turkey) Vakıfbank Istanbul	24–26	19–25	14–25			57–76	Report
6 Feb	18:00	Vakıfbank Istanbul (Turkey)	3–0	(Bulgaria) Maritza Plovdiv	25–19	25–17	25–19			75–55	Report
6 Feb	20:00	Béziers VB (France)	0–3	(Germany) Allianz MTV Stuttgart	19–25	20–25	16–25			55–75	Report
20 Feb	18:00	Maritza Plovdiv (Bulgaria)	3–1	(France) Béziers VB	25–15	19–25	25–15	25–16		94–71	Report
20 Feb	19:00	Allianz MTV Stuttgart (Germany)	0–3	(Turkey) Vakıfbank Istanbul	23–25	18–25	18–25			59–75	Report
26 Feb	19:00	Vakıfbank Istanbul (Turkey)	3–0	(France) Béziers VB	25–10	25–18	25–16			75–44	Report
26 Feb	20:00	Maritza Plovdiv (Bulgaria)	1–3	(Germany) Allianz MTV Stuttgart	24–26	19–25	25–22	22–25		90–98	Report

=== Pool B ===
Pos	Team	Pld	W	L	Pts	SW	SL	SR	SPW	SPL	SPR	Qualification
1	(Turkey) Eczacıbaşı VitrA Istanbul	6	6	0	17	18	3	6.000	503	380	1.324	Playoff round
2	(Russia) Dynamo Kazan	6	3	3	10	12	9	1.333	456	426	1.070	
3	(Russia) Uralochka-NTMK Ekaterinburg	6	3	3	8	11	13	0.846	497	503	0.988	
4	(Finland) HPK Hämeenlinna	6	0	6	1	2	18	0.111	333	480	0.694	

Date	Time		Score		Set 1	Set 2	Set 3	Set 4	Set 5	Total	Report
20 Nov	19:00	Dynamo Kazan (Russia)	3–0	(Finland) HPK Hämeenlinna	25–12	25–13	25–10			75–35	Report
21 Nov	19:30	Eczacıbaşı VitrA Istanbul (Turkey)	3–0	(Russia) Uralochka-NTMK Ekaterinburg	25–16	25–17	25–21			75–54	Report
18 Dec	19:00	Uralochka-NTMK Ekaterinburg (Russia)	3–2	(Russia) Dynamo Kazan	23–25	17–25	25–17	26–24	15–5	106–96	Report
19 Dec	20:00	HPK Hämeenlinna (Finland)	0–3	(Turkey) Eczacıbaşı VitrA Istanbul	11–25	20–25	16–25			47–75	Report
22 Jan	19:00	Dynamo Kazan (Russia)	1–3	(Turkey) Eczacıbaşı VitrA Istanbul	16–25	16–25	25–22	22–25		79–97	Report
24 Jan	19:00	Uralochka-NTMK Ekaterinburg (Russia)	3–0	(Finland) HPK Hämeenlinna	25–19	25–21	25–15			75–55	Report
5 Feb	17:30	Eczacıbaşı VitrA Istanbul (Turkey)	3–0	(Finland) HPK Hämeenlinna	25–17	25–7	25–20			75–44	Report
5 Feb	19:00	Dynamo Kazan (Russia)	3–0	(Russia) Uralochka-NTMK Ekaterinburg	25–19	25–17	25–21			75–57	Report
19 Feb	18:30	HPK Hämeenlinna (Finland)	0–3	(Russia) Dynamo Kazan	19–25	18–25	19–25			56–75	Report
20 Feb	19:00	Uralochka-NTMK Ekaterinburg (Russia)	2–3	(Turkey) Eczacıbaşı VitrA Istanbul	20–25	22–25	25–19	25–22	8–15	100–106	Report
26 Feb	17:00	Eczacıbaşı VitrA Istanbul (Turkey)	3–0	(Russia) Dynamo Kazan	25–21	25–18	25–17			75–56	Report
26 Feb	18:30	HPK Hämeenlinna (Finland)	2–3	(Russia) Uralochka-NTMK Ekaterinburg	25–19	25–21	21–25	20–25	5–15	96–105	Report

=== Pool C ===
Pos	Team	Pld	W	L	Pts	SW	SL	SR	SPW	SPL	SPR	Qualification
1	(Italy) Igor Gorgonzola Novara	6	6	0	18	18	0	MAX	459	323	1.421	Playoff round
2	(Poland) Budowlani Łódź	6	4	2	11	12	9	1.333	458	474	0.966	
3	(France) RC Cannes	6	1	5	4	6	15	0.400	456	511	0.892	
4	(Belarus) Minchanka Minsk	6	1	5	3	4	16	0.250	442	507	0.872	

Date	Time		Score		Set 1	Set 2	Set 3	Set 4	Set 5	Total	Report
21 Nov	20:00	RC Cannes (France)	3–0	(Belarus) Minchanka Minsk	25–20	25–19	25–18			75–57	Report
22 Nov	20:30	Igor Gorgonzola Novara (Italy)	3–0	(Poland) Budowlani Łódź	25–19	25–19	25–20			75–58	Report
19 Dec	20:00	Minchanka Minsk (Belarus)	0–3	(Italy) Igor Gorgonzola Novara	19–25	32–34	16–25			67–84	Report
20 Dec	18:00	Budowlani Łódź (Poland)	3–0	(France) RC Cannes	25–23	25–23	30–28			80–74	Report
22 Jan	19:30	RC Cannes (France)	0–3	(Italy) Igor Gorgonzola Novara	15–25	17–25	19–25			51–75	Report
23 Jan	20:00	Budowlani Łódź (Poland)	3–0	(Belarus) Minchanka Minsk	25–22	25–21	26–24			76–67	Report
5 Feb	20:30	RC Cannes (France)	2–3	(Poland) Budowlani Łódź	25–18	23–25	25–22	18–25	8–15	99–105	Report
7 Feb	20:30	Igor Gorgonzola Novara (Italy)	3–0	(Belarus) Minchanka Minsk	25–16	25–13	25–19			75–48	Report
19 Feb	18:00	Budowlani Łódź (Poland)	0–3	(Italy) Igor Gorgonzola Novara	19–25	16–25	11–25			46–75	Report
21 Feb	19:00	Minchanka Minsk (Belarus)	3–1	(France) RC Cannes	44–46	25–21	25–19	25–18		119–104	Report
26 Feb	20:00	Minchanka Minsk (Belarus)	1–3	(Poland) Budowlani Łódź	19–25	19–25	25–18	21–25		84–93	Report
26 Feb	20:30	Igor Gorgonzola Novara (Italy)	3–0	(France) RC Cannes	25–20	25–18	25–15			75–53	Report

=== Pool D ===
Pos	Team	Pld	W	L	Pts	SW	SL	SR	SPW	SPL	SPR	Qualification
1	(Italy) Savino Del Bene Scandicci	6	4	2	12	15	8	1.875	506	482	1.050	Playoff round
2	(Italy) Imoco Volley Conegliano	6	4	2	11	14	10	1.400	553	465	1.189	Playoff round
3	(Germany) SSC Palmberg Schwerin	6	3	3	10	12	11	1.091	513	519	0.988	
4	(Poland) ŁKS Commercecon Łódź	6	1	5	3	4	16	0.250	375	481	0.780	

Date	Time		Score		Set 1	Set 2	Set 3	Set 4	Set 5	Total	Report
20 Nov	20:30	ŁKS Commercecon Łódź (Poland)	3–1	(Germany) SSC Palmberg Schwerin	25–18	25–23	14–25	25–17		89–83	Report
21 Nov	20:30	Imoco Volley Conegliano (Italy)	3–2	(Italy) Savino Del Bene Scandicci	25–21	24–26	25–12	23–25	15–10	112–94	Report
18 Dec	19:00	SSC Palmberg Schwerin (Germany)	3–0	(Italy) Imoco Volley Conegliano	36–34	25–19	25–22			86–75	Report
20 Dec	20:30	Savino Del Bene Scandicci (Italy)	3–0	(Poland) ŁKS Commercecon Łódź	25–10	25–23	25–23			75–56	Report
22 Jan	18:00	ŁKS Commercecon Łódź (Poland)	0–3	(Italy) Imoco Volley Conegliano	20–25	15–25	17–25			52–75	Report
23 Jan	20:30	Savino Del Bene Scandicci (Italy)	3–0	(Germany) SSC Palmberg Schwerin	25–16	28–26	25–17			78–59	Report
5 Feb	18:00	ŁKS Commercecon Łódź (Poland)	0–3	(Italy) Savino Del Bene Scandicci	21–25	22–25	17–25			60–75	Report
6 Feb	20:30	Imoco Volley Conegliano (Italy)	3–2	(Germany) SSC Palmberg Schwerin	23–25	24–26	25–19	25–19	15–7	112–96	Report
19 Feb	19:30	SSC Palmberg Schwerin (Germany)	3–1	(Poland) ŁKS Commercecon Łódź	23–25	25–21	25–18	25–17		98–81	Report
20 Feb	20:30	Savino Del Bene Scandicci (Italy)	3–2	(Italy) Imoco Volley Conegliano	15–25	25–22	25–23	20–25	15–9	100–104	Report
26 Feb	19:00	SSC Palmberg Schwerin (Germany)	3–1	(Italy) Savino Del Bene Scandicci	16–25	25–23	25–23	25–13		91–84	Report
26 Feb	20:30	Imoco Volley Conegliano (Italy)	3–0	(Poland) ŁKS Commercecon Łódź	25–10	25–12	25–15			75–37	Report

=== Pool E ===
Pos	Team	Pld	W	L	Pts	SW	SL	SR	SPW	SPL	SPR	Qualification
1	(Turkey) Fenerbahçe SK Istanbul	6	5	1	16	17	5	3.400	515	422	1.220	Playoff round
2	(Russia) Dinamo Moscow	6	5	1	13	16	9	1.778	554	521	1.063	Playoff round
3	(Romania) CSM București	6	1	5	4	7	16	0.438	474	523	0.906	
4	(Poland) Chemik Police	6	1	5	3	7	17	0.412	464	541	0.858	

Date	Time		Score		Set 1	Set 2	Set 3	Set 4	Set 5	Total	Report
21 Nov	19:00	Dinamo Moscow (Russia)	1–3	(Turkey) Fenerbahçe SK Istanbul	17–25	25–17	18–25	11–25		71–92	Report
22 Nov	18:00	Chemik Police (Poland)	1–3	(Romania) CSM București	19–25	16–25	25–16	22–25		82–91	Report
19 Dec	18:30	Fenerbahçe SK Istanbul (Turkey)	3–0	(Poland) Chemik Police	25–12	25–16	25–22			75–50	Report
20 Dec	19:30	CSM București (Romania)	0–3	(Russia) Dinamo Moscow	21–25	27–29	27–29			75–83	Report
23 Jan	18:30	Fenerbahçe SK Istanbul (Turkey)	3–0	(Romania) CSM București	25–18	25–19	25–22			75–59	Report
24 Jan	18:00	Chemik Police (Poland)	2–3	(Russia) Dinamo Moscow	25–16	16–25	21–25	25–19	5–15	92–100	Report
6 Feb	18:00	Chemik Police (Poland)	0–3	(Turkey) Fenerbahçe SK Istanbul	24–26	20–25	15–25			59–76	Report
6 Feb	19:00	Dinamo Moscow (Russia)	3–1	(Romania) CSM București	25–18	25–20	14–25	25–15		89–78	Report
20 Feb	19:00	Fenerbahçe SK Istanbul (Turkey)	2–3	(Russia) Dinamo Moscow	25–23	12–25	25–23	24–26	15–17	101–114	Report
20 Feb	19:30	CSM București (Romania)	2–3	(Poland) Chemik Police	25–17	23–25	25–16	21–25	8–15	102–98	Report
26 Feb	19:00	Dinamo Moscow (Russia)	3–1	(Poland) Chemik Police	25–20	25–17	22–25	25–21		97–83	Report
26 Feb	20:00	CSM București (Romania)	1–3	(Turkey) Fenerbahçe SK Istanbul	11–25	25–21	19–25	14–25		69–96	Report

== Playoff round ==
- Drawing of lots was held in Luxembourg City, Luxembourg on 1 March 2019.

=== Quarter-finals ===
Team 1	Agg.	Team 2	1st leg	2nd leg	Golden Set
Allianz MTV Stuttgart (Germany)	1–5	(Italy) Igor Gorgonzola Novara	1–3	2–3	
Dinamo Moscow (Russia)	2–4	(Turkey) Vakıfbank Istanbul	3–2	0–3	
Savino Del Bene Scandicci (Italy)	1–5	(Turkey) Fenerbahçe SK Istanbul	1–3	2–3	
Imoco Volley Conegliano (Italy)	3–3	(Turkey) Eczacıbaşı VitrA Istanbul	0–3	3–1	15–10

==== First leg ====
Date	Time		Score		Set 1	Set 2	Set 3	Set 4	Set 5	Total	Report
12 Mar	19:00	Allianz MTV Stuttgart (Germany)	1–3	(Italy) Igor Gorgonzola Novara	19–25	24–26	25–19	20–25		88–95	Report
13 Mar	18:30	Savino Del Bene Scandicci (Italy)	1–3	(Turkey) Fenerbahçe SK Istanbul	19–25	25–23	19–25	21–25		84–98	Report
13 Mar	19:00	Dinamo Moscow (Russia)	3–2	(Turkey) Vakıfbank Istanbul	20–25	25–23	25–23	21–25	15–13	106–109	Report
13 Mar	20:30	Imoco Volley Conegliano (Italy)	0–3	(Turkey) Eczacıbaşı VitrA Istanbul	21–25	25–27	22–25			68–77	Report

==== Second leg ====
Date	Time		Score		Set 1	Set 2	Set 3	Set 4	Set 5	Total	Report
19 Mar	17:00	Eczacıbaşı VitrA Istanbul (Turkey)	1–3	(Italy) Imoco Volley Conegliano	21–25	23–25	25–21	21–25		90–96	Report
Golden set		Eczacıbaşı VitrA Istanbul (Turkey)	10–15	(Italy) Imoco Volley Conegliano							
19 Mar	20:00	Fenerbahçe SK Istanbul (Turkey)	3–2	(Italy) Savino Del Bene Scandicci	19–25	26–28	25–22	25–17	15–8	110–100	Report
20 Mar	19:00	Vakıfbank Istanbul (Turkey)	3–0	(Russia) Dinamo Moscow	25–19	25–16	25–8			75–43	Report
21 Mar	20:30	Igor Gorgonzola Novara (Italy)	3–2	(Germany) Allianz MTV Stuttgart	25–14	25–22	16–25	18–25	16–14	100–100	Report

=== Semifinals ===
Team 1	Agg.	Team 2	1st leg	2nd leg	Golden Set
Vakıfbank Istanbul (Turkey)	3–3	(Italy) Igor Gorgonzola Novara	0–3	3–1	14–16
Imoco Volley Conegliano (Italy)	6–0	(Turkey) Fenerbahçe SK Istanbul	3–0	3–0	

==== First leg ====
Date	Time		Score		Set 1	Set 2	Set 3	Set 4	Set 5	Total	Report
2 Apr	20:30	Imoco Volley Conegliano (Italy)	3–0	(Turkey) Fenerbahçe SK Istanbul	25–21	25–23	26–24			76–68	Report
4 Apr	19:00	Vakıfbank Istanbul (Turkey)	0–3	(Italy) Igor Gorgonzola Novara	17–25	25–27	15–25			57–77	Report

==== Second leg ====
Date	Time		Score		Set 1	Set 2	Set 3	Set 4	Set 5	Total	Report
9 Apr	19:00	Fenerbahçe SK Istanbul (Turkey)	0–3	(Italy) Imoco Volley Conegliano	18–25	22–25	26–28			66–78	Report
10 Apr	20:30	Igor Gorgonzola Novara (Italy)	1–3	(Turkey) Vakıfbank Istanbul	23–25	20–25	25–15	21–25		89–90	Report
Golden set		Igor Gorgonzola Novara (Italy)	16–14	(Turkey) Vakıfbank Istanbul							

=== Final ===
Date	Time		Score		Set 1	Set 2	Set 3	Set 4	Set 5	Total	Report
18 May	16:00	Igor Gorgonzola Novara (Italy)	3–1	(Italy) Imoco Volley Conegliano	25–18	25–17	14–25	25–22		89–82	Report
