= 2020–21 CEV Women's Champions League =

2020–2021 CEV Women's Champions League
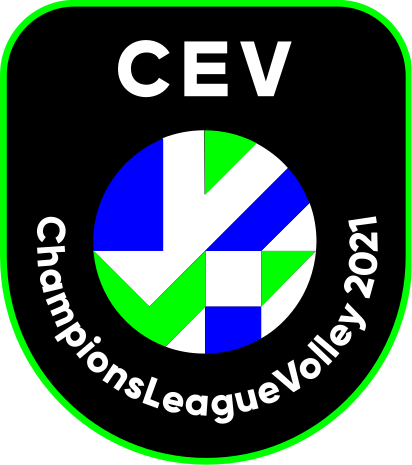
- League: CEV Women's Champions League
- Sport: Volleyball
- Duration: Qualifying round: 22 September – 14 October 2020; Main tournament: 24 November 2020 – 1 May 2021
- Number of teams: 29 (13 qual. + 16 main tourn.)
- Finals champions: (Italy) Imoco Volley Conegliano
- Runners-up: (Turkey) Vakifbank Istanbul
- Finals MVP: (Italy) Paola Egonu

CEV Women's Champions League seasons
- ← 2019–20 2021–22 →

The 2020–21 CEV Champions League was the highest level of European club volleyball in the 2020–21 season and the 61st edition.

== Qualification ==
A total of 20 teams participate in the main competition, with 17 teams being allocated direct vacancies on the basis of ranking list for European Cup Competitions and 3 teams qualify from the qualification rounds.

== Format ==
League round

A round-robin format (two single round-robin tournaments held in ‘bio-secure bubbles’ at two different venues in each pool) where the 20 participating teams are drawn into 5 pools of 4 teams each. The five pool winners and the best three second placed teams among all pools qualify for the Playoffs.

The standings is determined by the number of matches won. In case of a tie in the number of matches won by two or more teams, their ranking is based on the following criteria:

- result points (points awarded for results: 3 points for 3–0 or 3–1 wins, 2 points for 3–2 win, 1 point for 2–3 loss);
- set quotient (the number of total sets won divided by the number of total sets lost);
- points quotient (the number of total points scored divided by the number of total points lost);
- results of head-to-head matches between the teams in question.

Playoffs

A knockout format where the 8 qualified teams are each draw into the quarter-finals with the round winners advancing to the next rounds (semifinals and final). Matches in the quarter-finals and semifinals consists of two legs (home and away).
Result points are awarded for each leg (3 points for 3–0 or 3–1 wins, 2 points for 3–2 win, 1 point for 2–3 loss). After two legs, the team with the most result points advances further in the tournament. In case teams are tied after two legs, a Golden Set is played immediately at the completion of the second leg. The Golden Set winner is the team that first obtains 15 points, provided that the points difference between the two teams is at least 2 points (thus, the Golden Set is similar to a tiebreak set in a normal match).

Grand finale

A single match between the winners of the semifinals in a neutral venue decides the tournament champion.

== Pool composition ==
Drawing of lots for the league round was held on 21 August 2020 in Luxembourg City. The 20 teams are divided in 4 pots of 5 teams each, with one team per pot being draw into each of the 5 pools (A, B, C, D, E).

Pot 1	Pot 2	Pot 3	Pot 4
Vakıfbank Istanbul (Turkey 1); Imoco Volley Conegliano (Italy 1); Dinamo-Ak Bars (Russia 1); Eczacıbaşı VitrA Istanbul (Turkey 2); Unet E-Work Busto Arsizio (Italy 2)	Chemik Police (Poland 1); ASPTT Mulhouse (France 1); Lokomotiv Kaliningrad (Russia 2); Developres SkyRes Rzeszów (Poland 2); Nantes VB (France 2)	SSC Palmberg Schwerin (Germany 1); Maritza Plovdiv (Bulgaria 1); VK UP Olomouc (Czech 1); LP Salo (Finland 1); Fenerbahçe SK Istanbul (Turkey 3)	Igor Gorgonzola Novara (Italy 3); Uralochka-NTMK Ekaterinburg (Russia 3) (N/A) Winner from Qualification (N/A) Winner from Qualification (N/A) Winner from Qualification

Draw

Pool A	Pool B	Pool C	Pool D	Pool E
Unet E-Work Busto Arsizio	Imoco Volley Conegliano	Vakifbank Istanbul	Eczacıbaşı VitrA Istanbul	Dinamo-Ak Bars
Developres SkyRes Rzeszów	Nantes VB	ASPTT Mulhouse	Lokomotiv Kaliningrad	Grupa Azoty Chemik Police
SSC Palmberg Schwerin	Fenerbahçe Opet Istanbul	Maritza Plovdiv	LP Salo	VK UP Olomouc
(N/A) Winner from Qualification	Uralochka-NTMK Ekaterinburg	(N/A) Winner from Qualification	(N/A) Winner from Qualification	Igor Gorgonzola Novara

After drawing of lots, LP Salo and Uralochka-NTMK Ekaterinburg announced their withdrawal from the competition. The drawing of lots changes as follows:

Pool A	Pool B	Pool C	Pool D	Pool E
Unet E-Work Busto Arsizio	Imoco Volley Conegliano	Vakifbank Istanbul	Eczacıbaşı VitrA Istanbul	Dinamo-Ak Bars
Developres SkyRes Rzeszów	Nantes VB	ASPTT Mulhouse	Lokomotiv Kaliningrad	Grupa Azoty Chemik Police
SSC Palmberg Schwerin	Fenerbahçe Opet Istanbul	Maritza Plovdiv	Allianz MTV Stuttgart	VK UP Olomouc
Savino Del Bene Scandicci	Calcit Volley Kamnik	ŁKS Commercecon Łódź	(Russia) Dinamo Moscow	Igor Gorgonzola Novara

== League round ==
The league round started on 24 November 2020.

- All times are local.

=== Pool A ===
Pos	Team	Pld	W	L	Pts	SW	SL	SR	SPW	SPL	SPR	Qualification
1	(Italy) Savino Del Bene Scandicci	6	4	2	12	15	9	1.667	542	509	1.065	Quarterfinals
2	(Italy) Unet E-Work Busto Arsizio	6	4	2	11	14	10	1.400	523	479	1.092	Quarterfinals
3	(Germany) SSC Palmberg Schwerin	6	3	3	8	10	12	0.833	467	484	0.965	
4	(Poland) Developres SkyRes Rzeszów	6	1	5	5	8	16	0.500	513	573	0.895	

Date	Time		Score		Set 1	Set 2	Set 3	Set 4	Set 5	Total	Report
1 Dec	17:30	Savino Del Bene Scandicci (Italy)	3–2	(Italy) Unet E-Work Busto Arsizio	25–18	11–25	25–19	23–25	17–15	101–102	Report
1 Dec	20:30	SSC Palmberg Schwerin (Germany)	3–1	(Poland) Developres SkyRes Rzeszów	25–27	25–18	25–18	25–18		100–81	Report
2 Dec	17:30	SSC Palmberg Schwerin (Germany)	1–3	(Italy) Savino Del Bene Scandicci	25–19	19–25	20–25	21–25		85–94	Report
2 Dec	20:30	Developres SkyRes Rzeszów (Poland)	2–3	(Italy) Unet E-Work Busto Arsizio	17–25	22–25	25–19	25–22	14–16	103–107	Report
3 Dec	17:30	Unet E-Work Busto Arsizio (Italy)	0–3	(Germany) SSC Palmberg Schwerin	24–26	14–25	22–25			60–76	Report
3 Dec	20:30	Developres SkyRes Rzeszów (Poland)	0–3	(Italy) Savino Del Bene Scandicci	23–25	18–25	16–25			57–75	Report
2 Feb	17:00	Savino Del Bene Scandicci (Italy)	2–3	(Italy) Unet E-Work Busto Arsizio	18–25	25–21	14–25	25–18	10–15	92–104	Report
2 Feb	20:00	SSC Palmberg Schwerin (Germany)	3–2	(Poland) Developres SkyRes Rzeszów	25–18	22–25	23–25	26–24	15–7	111–99	Report
3 Feb	17:00	Developres SkyRes Rzeszów (Poland)	0–3	(Italy) Unet E-Work Busto Arsizio	23–25	22–25	17–25			62–75	Report
3 Feb	20:00	SSC Palmberg Schwerin (Germany)	0–3	(Italy) Savino Del Bene Scandicci	22–25	13–25	15–25			50–75	Report
4 Feb	17:00	Developres SkyRes Rzeszów (Poland)	3–1	(Italy) Savino Del Bene Scandicci	33–35	25–22	25–22	28–26		111–105	Report
4 Feb	20:00	Unet E-Work Busto Arsizio (Italy)	3–0	(Germany) SSC Palmberg Schwerin	25–20	25–13	25–12			75–45	Report

=== Pool B ===
Pos	Team	Pld	W	L	Pts	SW	SL	SR	SPW	SPL	SPR	Qualification
1	(Italy) Imoco Volley Conegliano	6	6	0	18	18	1	18.000	473	337	1.404	Quarterfinals
2	(Turkey) Fenerbahçe Opet Istanbul	6	4	2	12	13	7	1.857	455	412	1.104	Quarterfinals
3	(France) Nantes VB	6	2	4	6	6	13	0.462	389	447	0.870	
4	(Slovenia) Calcit Volley Kamnik	6	0	6	0	2	18	0.111	372	493	0.755	

Date	Time		Score		Set 1	Set 2	Set 3	Set 4	Set 5	Total	Report
8 Dec	18:00	Calcit Volley Kamnik (Slovenia)	0–3	(Italy) Imoco Volley Conegliano	18–25	17–25	15–25			50–75	Report
8 Dec	20:30	Fenerbahçe Opet Istanbul (Turkey)	3–0	(France) Nantes VB	25–16	25–18	25–15			75–49	Report
9 Dec	18:00	Nantes VB (France)	0–3	(Italy) Imoco Volley Conegliano	19–25	11–25	16–25			46–75	Report
9 Dec	20:30	Fenerbahçe Opet Istanbul (Turkey)	3–1	(Slovenia) Calcit Volley Kamnik	25–16	20–25	26–24	25–17		96–82	Report
10 Dec	18:00	Nantes VB (France)	3–0	(Slovenia) Calcit Volley Kamnik	25–22	25–19	25–20			75–61	Report
10 Dec	20:30	Imoco Volley Conegliano (Italy)	3–0	(Turkey) Fenerbahçe Opet Istanbul	25–14	25–19	25–19			75–52	Report
26 Jan	18:00	Fenerbahçe Opet Istanbul (Turkey)	3–0	(France) Nantes VB	25–22	25–16	25–20			75–58	Report
26 Jan	20:30	Calcit Volley Kamnik (Slovenia)	0–3	(Italy) Imoco Volley Conegliano	21–25	11–25	11–25			43–75	Report
27 Jan	18:00	Fenerbahçe Opet Istanbul (Turkey)	3–0	(Slovenia) Calcit Volley Kamnik	25–13	25–18	25–20			75–51	Report
27 Jan	20:30	Nantes VB (France)	0–3	(Italy) Imoco Volley Conegliano	20–25	20–25	24–26			64–76	Report
28 Jan	18:00	Nantes VB (France)	3–1	(Slovenia) Calcit Volley Kamnik	22–25	25–19	25–20	25–21		97–85	Report
28 Jan	20:30	Imoco Volley Conegliano (Italy)	3–1	(Turkey) Fenerbahçe Opet Istanbul	25–19	22–25	25–21	25–17		97–82	Report

=== Pool C ===
Pos	Team	Pld	W	L	Pts	SW	SL	SR	SPW	SPL	SPR	Qualification
1	(Turkey) Vakifbank Istanbul	6	6	0	18	18	2	9.000	498	352	1.415	Quarterfinals
2	(Poland) ŁKS Commercecon Łódź	6	4	2	11	12	10	1.200	497	477	1.042	
3	(France) ASPTT Mulhouse	6	2	4	6	7	13	0.538	418	462	0.905	
4	(Bulgaria) Maritza Plovdiv	6	0	6	1	6	18	0.333	452	574	0.787	

Date	Time		Score		Set 1	Set 2	Set 3	Set 4	Set 5	Total	Report
24 Nov	18:00	ŁKS Commercecon Łódź (Poland)	0–3	(Turkey) Vakifbank Istanbul	23–25	17–25	22–25			62–75	Report
24 Nov	20:30	Maritza Plovdiv (Bulgaria)	0–3	(France) ASPTT Mulhouse	17–25	19–25	13–25			49–75	Report
25 Nov	18:00	Maritza Plovdiv (Bulgaria)	2–3	(Poland) ŁKS Commercecon Łódź	18–25	25–20	25–20	17–25	10–15	95–105	Report
25 Nov	20:30	ASPTT Mulhouse (France)	0–3	(Turkey) Vakifbank Istanbul	18–25	16–25	18–25			52–75	Report
26 Nov	18:00	ASPTT Mulhouse (France)	0–3	(Poland) ŁKS Commercecon Łódź	20–25	23–25	20–25			63–75	Report
26 Nov	20:30	Vakifbank Istanbul (Turkey)	3–1	(Bulgaria) Maritza Plovdiv	25–9	25–10	23–25	25–16		98–60	Report
2 Feb	18:00	ŁKS Commercecon Łódź (Poland)	0–3	(Turkey) Vakifbank Istanbul	21–25	19–25	20–25			60–75	Report
2 Feb	20:30	Maritza Plovdiv (Bulgaria)	1–3	(France) ASPTT Mulhouse	23–25	25–22	22–25	22–25		92–97	Report
3 Feb	18:00	ASPTT Mulhouse (France)	0–3	(Turkey) Vakifbank Istanbul	15–25	13–25	18–25			46–75	Report
3 Feb	20:30	Maritza Plovdiv (Bulgaria)	1–3	(Poland) ŁKS Commercecon Łódź	24–26	18–25	25–23	17–25		84–99	Report
4 Feb	18:00	Vakifbank Istanbul (Turkey)	3–1	(Bulgaria) Maritza Plovdiv	25–11	25–20	25–27	25–14		100–72	Report
4 Feb	20:30	ASPTT Mulhouse (France)	1–3	(Poland) ŁKS Commercecon Łódź	23–25	19–25	25–21	18–25		85–96	Report

=== Pool D ===
Pos	Team	Pld	W	L	Pts	SW	SL	SR	SPW	SPL	SPR	Qualification
1	(Turkey) Eczacıbaşı VitrA Istanbul	6	6	0	16	18	5	3.600	544	442	1.231	Quarterfinals
2	(Russia) Dinamo Moscow	6	3	3	9	12	11	1.091	484	505	0.958	
3	(Germany) Allianz MTV Stuttgart	6	2	4	7	10	14	0.714	503	540	0.931	
4	(Russia) Lokomotiv Kaliningrad	6	1	5	4	5	15	0.333	426	470	0.906	

Date	Time		Score		Set 1	Set 2	Set 3	Set 4	Set 5	Total	Report
8 Dec	17:00	Dinamo Moscow (Russia)	3–2	(Russia) Lokomotiv Kaliningrad	25–23	13–25	27–29	25–23	17–15	107–115	Report
8 Dec	20:00	Allianz MTV Stuttgart (Germany)	2–3	(Turkey) Eczacıbaşı VitrA Istanbul	25–22	25–21	17–25	21–25	9–15	97–108	Report
9 Dec	17:30	Dinamo Moscow (Russia)	2–3	(Germany) Allianz MTV Stuttgart	27–29	25–13	25–22	14–25	11–15	102–104	Report
9 Dec	20:00	Lokomotiv Kaliningrad (Russia)	0–3	(Turkey) Eczacıbaşı VitrA Istanbul	17–25	22–25	22–25			61–75	Report
10 Dec	17:30	Lokomotiv Kaliningrad (Russia)	3–0	(Germany) Allianz MTV Stuttgart	25–23	25–20	25–20			75–63	Report
10 Dec	20:00	Eczacıbaşı VitrA Istanbul (Turkey)	3–0	(Russia) Dinamo Moscow	25–18	25–20	25–14			75–52	Report
2 Feb	16:00	Allianz MTV Stuttgart (Germany)	2–3	(Turkey) Eczacıbaşı VitrA Istanbul	32–30	23–25	25–22	14–25	9–15	103–117	Report
2 Feb	19:00	Dinamo Moscow (Russia)	3–0	(Russia) Lokomotiv Kaliningrad	25–20	25–13	25–23			75–56	Report
3 Feb	16:00	Dinamo Moscow (Russia)	3–0	(Germany) Allianz MTV Stuttgart	25–21	25–20	25–20			75–61	Report
3 Feb	19:00	Lokomotiv Kaliningrad (Russia)	0–3	(Turkey) Eczacıbaşı VitrA Istanbul	20–25	19–25	17–25			56–75	Report
4 Feb	16:00	Eczacıbaşı VitrA Istanbul (Turkey)	3–1	(Russia) Dinamo Moscow	25–16	19–25	25–14	25–18		94–73	Report
4 Feb	19:00	Lokomotiv Kaliningrad (Russia)	0–3	(Germany) Allianz MTV Stuttgart	23–25	19–25	21–25			63–75	Report

=== Pool E ===
Pos	Team	Pld	W	L	Pts	SW	SL	SR	SPW	SPL	SPR	Qualification
1	(Italy) Igor Gorgonzola Novara	6	6	0	17	18	5	3.600	557	463	1.203	Quarterfinals
2	(Poland) Grupa Azoty Chemik Police	6	4	2	13	15	6	2.500	484	437	1.108	Quarterfinals
3	(Russia) Dinamo-Ak Bars	6	2	4	6	7	13	0.538	445	464	0.959	
4	(Czech Republic) VK UP Olomouc	6	0	6	0	2	18	0.111	374	496	0.754	

Date	Time		Score		Set 1	Set 2	Set 3	Set 4	Set 5	Total	Report
24 Nov	17:30	Igor Gorgonzola Novara (Italy)	3–0	(Russia) Dinamo-Ak Bars	25–19	25–22	25–13			75–54	Report
24 Nov	20:30	VK UP Olomouc (Czech Republic)	0–3	(Poland) Grupa Azoty Chemik Police	18–25	19–25	18–25			55–75	Report
25 Nov	17:30	VK UP Olomouc (Czech Republic)	0–3	(Italy) Igor Gorgonzola Novara	17–25	25–27	20–25			62–77	Report
25 Nov	20:30	Grupa Azoty Chemik Police (Poland)	3–0	(Russia) Dinamo-Ak Bars	25–21	25–22	25–18			75–61	Report
26 Nov	17:30	Dinamo-Ak Bars (Russia)	3–0	(Czech Republic) VK UP Olomouc	25–18	25–17	25–20			75–55	Report
26 Nov	20:30	Grupa Azoty Chemik Police (Poland)	2–3	(Italy) Igor Gorgonzola Novara	25–27	22–25	25–21	25–21	6–15	103–109	Report
2 Feb	17:30	Igor Gorgonzola Novara (Italy)	3–1	(Russia) Dinamo-Ak Bars	30–28	22–25	25–22	25–20		102–95	Report
2 Feb	20:30	VK UP Olomouc (Czech Republic)	0–3	(Poland) Grupa Azoty Chemik Police	12–25	23–25	17–25			52–75	Report
3 Feb	17:30	VK UP Olomouc (Czech Republic)	1–3	(Italy) Igor Gorgonzola Novara	15–25	25–22	8–25	23–25		71–97	Report
3 Feb	20:30	Grupa Azoty Chemik Police (Poland)	3–0	(Russia) Dinamo-Ak Bars	28–26	25–20	25–17			78–63	Report
4 Feb	17:30	Dinamo-Ak Bars (Russia)	3–1	(Czech Republic) VK UP Olomouc	25–18	22–25	25–21	25–15		97–79	Report
4 Feb	20:30	Grupa Azoty Chemik Police (Poland)	1–3	(Italy) Igor Gorgonzola Novara	19–25	25–22	18–25	16–25		78–97	Report

=== First place ranking ===
Pos	Team	Pld	W	L	Pts	SW	SL	SR	SPW	SPL	SPR
1	(Italy) Imoco Volley Conegliano	6	6	0	18	18	1	18.000	473	337	1.404
2	(Turkey) Vakifbank Istanbul	6	6	0	18	18	2	9.000	498	352	1.415
3	(Italy) Igor Gorgonzola Novara	6	6	0	17	18	5	3.600	557	463	1.203
4	(Turkey) Eczacıbaşı VitrA Istanbul	6	6	0	16	18	5	3.600	544	442	1.231
5	(Italy) Savino Del Bene Scandicci	6	4	2	12	15	9	1.667	542	509	1.065

=== Second place ranking ===
Pos	Team	Pld	W	L	Pts	SW	SL	SR	SPW	SPL	SPR	Qualification
1	(Poland) Grupa Azoty Chemik Police	6	4	2	13	15	6	2.500	484	437	1.108	Quarterfinals
2	(Turkey) Fenerbahçe Opet Istanbul	6	4	2	12	13	7	1.857	455	412	1.104	Quarterfinals
3	(Italy) Unet E-Work Busto Arsizio	6	4	2	11	14	10	1.400	523	479	1.092	Quarterfinals
4	(Russia) Dinamo Moscow	6	3	3	9	12	11	1.091	484	505	0.958	
5	(France) ASPTT Mulhouse	6	2	4	6	7	13	0.538	418	462	0.905	

== Playoffs ==
- Drawing of Lots was held on 12 February 2021 in Luxembourg City.

#	Cup 1	Cup 2
1	(Italy) Imoco Volley Conegliano	(Italy) Savino Del Bene Scandicci
2	(Turkey) Vakıfbank Istanbul	(Poland) Grupa Azoty Chemik Police
3	(Italy) Igor Gorgonzola Novara	(Turkey) Fenerbahçe Opet Istanbul
4	(Turkey) Eczacıbaşı VitrA Istanbul	(Italy) Unet E-Work Busto Arsizio

=== Bracket ===
Quarterfinals
1E	(Italy) Igor Gorgonzola Novara	3	3
2B	(Turkey) Fenerbahçe Opet Istanbul	1	1
1B	(Italy) Imoco Volley Conegliano	3	3
1A	(Italy) Savino Del Bene Scandicci	2	0
1C	(Turkey) VakıfBank Istanbul	3	3
2E	(Poland) Grupa Azoty Chemik Police	0	0
1D	(Turkey) Eczacıbaşı VitrA Istanbul	1	1
2A	(Italy) Unet E-Work Busto Arsizio	3	3

Semifinals
1E	(Italy) Igor Gorgonzola Novara	0	0
1B	(Italy) Imoco Volley Conegliano	3	3
1C	(Turkey) VakıfBank Istanbul	2	3
2A	(Italy) Unet E-Work Busto Arsizio	3	0

Final
1B	(Italy) Imoco Volley Conegliano	3
1C	(Turkey) VakıfBank Istanbul	2

- All times are local.

=== Quarterfinals ===
Team 1	Agg.	Team 2	1st leg	2nd leg
Fenerbahçe Opet Istanbul (Turkey)	0–6	(Italy) Igor Gorgonzola Novara	1–3	1–3
Savino Del Bene Scandicci (Italy)	1–5	(Italy) Imoco Volley Conegliano	2–3	0–3
Grupa Azoty Chemik Police (Poland)	0–6	(Turkey) Vakıfbank Istanbul	0–3	0–3
Unet E-Work Busto Arsizio (Italy)	6–0	(Turkey) Eczacıbaşı VitrA Istanbul	3–1	3–1

==== First leg ====
Date	Time		Score		Set 1	Set 2	Set 3	Set 4	Set 5	Total	Report
23 Feb	17:00	Fenerbahçe Opet Istanbul (Turkey)	1–3	(Italy) Igor Gorgonzola Novara	25–19	12–25	19–25	25–27		81–96	Report
24 Feb	17:30	Savino Del Bene Scandicci (Italy)	2–3	(Italy) Imoco Volley Conegliano	25–17	27–29	30–28	23–25	15–17	120–116	Report
25 Feb	18:00	Grupa Azoty Chemik Police (Poland)	0–3	(Turkey) VakıfBank Istanbul	9–25	15–25	20–25			44–75	Report
25 Feb	18:00	Unet E-Work Busto Arsizio (Italy)	3–1	(Turkey) Eczacıbaşı VitrA Istanbul	25–19	15–25	25–17	28–26		93–87	Report

==== Second leg ====
Date	Time		Score		Set 1	Set 2	Set 3	Set 4	Set 5	Total	Report
3 Mar	19:00	Igor Gorgonzola Novara (Italy)	3–1	(Turkey) Fenerbahçe Opet Istanbul	25–16	25–18	16–25	25–11		91–70	Report
3 Mar	20:30	Imoco Volley Conegliano (Italy)	3–0	(Italy) Savino Del Bene Scandicci	25–20	25–17	25–20			75–57	Report
4 Mar	17:00	VakıfBank Istanbul (Turkey)	3–0	(Poland) Grupa Azoty Chemik Police	25–21	25–13	25–13			75–47	Report
4 Mar	19:30	Eczacıbaşı VitrA Istanbul (Turkey)	1–3	(Italy) Unet E-Work Busto Arsizio	23–25	22–25	25–22	26–28		96–100	Report

=== Semifinals ===
Team 1	Agg.	Team 2	1st leg	2nd leg
Igor Gorgonzola Novara (Italy)	0–6	(Italy) Imoco Volley Conegliano	0–3	0–3
Vakıfbank Istanbul (Turkey)	4–2	(Italy) Unet E-Work Busto Arsizio	2–3	3–0

==== First leg ====
Date	Time		Score		Set 1	Set 2	Set 3	Set 4	Set 5	Total	Report
17 Mar	21:00	Igor Gorgonzola Novara (Italy)	0–3	(Italy) Imoco Volley Conegliano	21–25	18–25	17–25			56–75	Report
17 Mar	20:00	VakıfBank Istanbul (Turkey)	2–3	(Italy) Unet E-Work Busto Arsizio	25–20	25–17	21–25	13–25	13–15	97–102	Report

==== Second leg ====
Date	Time		Score		Set 1	Set 2	Set 3	Set 4	Set 5	Total	Report
23 Mar	20:30	Imoco Volley Conegliano (Italy)	3–0	(Italy) Igor Gorgonzola Novara	25–15	25–23	25–20			75–58	Report
24 Mar	18:00	Unet E-Work Busto Arsizio (Italy)	0–3	(Turkey) VakıfBank Istanbul	13–25	15–25	15–25			43–75	Report

=== Final ===
Date	Time		Score		Set 1	Set 2	Set 3	Set 4	Set 5	Total	Report
1 May	17:00	Imoco Volley Conegliano (Italy)	3–2	(Turkey) VakıfBank Istanbul	22–25	25–22	23–25	25–23	15–12	110–107	Report
