= 2012–13 Turkish Women's Volleyball League =

2012–2013 Turkey Women's Volleyball League
- Sport: Volleyball
- Founded: 1983
- No. of teams: 12
- Country: Turkey
- Continent: (European Union) Europe
- Most recent champion: VakıfBank S.K.
- Most titles: Eczacıbaşı VitrA (17)
- Broadcaster: SmartSpor – NtvSpor

The 2012–13 Turkish Women's Volleyball League (Turkish: Türkiye Kadınlar Voleybol 1. Ligi), was the annual season of the country's highest volleyball level and was conquered for 7th time in a row by VakıfBank S.K.

== Teams ==
1. VakıfBank
2. Eczacıbaşı VitrA
3. Galatasaray Daikin
4. Fenerbahçe
5. Beşiktaş Bahçeşehir Üni.
6. Bursa Büyükşehir Bld.
7. Sarıyer Bld
8. Yeşilyurt
9. Nilüfer Belediyesi
10. İBA TED Ankara Kolejliler
11. Ereğli Belediye
12. İlbank

== Regular season ==
Rank	Team	Point	J	G	P	PP	PC	Ratio	YLP
1.	VakıfBank	67.20	22	22	0	66	8	8.250	3.20
2.	Eczacıbaşı VitrA	62.90	22	20	2	62	12	5.167	2.90
3.	Galatasaray Daikin	47.80	22	15	7	50	30	1.167	2.80
4.	Fenerbahçe	47.30	22	15	7	52	26	2.000	2.30
5.	Bursa Büyükşehir Bld.	33.80	22	11	11	41	39	1.051	1.80
6.	Beşiktaş Bahçeşehir Üni.	31.80	22	11	11	36	43	0.837	0.80
7.	İlbank	28.80	22	8	14	35	47	0.745	1.80
8.	Sarıyer Bld	25.00	22	9	13	33	50	0.660	0
9.	Yeşilyurt	24.00	22	7	15	31	52	5.166	2.00
10.	Ereğli Belediye	20.30	22	7	15	30	51	0.588	0.30
11.	Nilüfer Belediyesi	20.20	22	6	16	24	52	0.462	1.20
12.	İBA TED Ankara Kolejliler	6.70	22	1	21	13	63	0.206	0.70

– YLP : Young League Point

== Individual awards ==
Award	Player	Team
MVP	(Turkey) Gözde Kırdar	Vakıfbank
Best Scorer	(Serbia) Jovana Brakocevic	Vakıfbank
Best Spiker	(Turkey) Gözde Kırdar	Vakıfbank
Best Blocker	(Turkey) Bahar Toksoy	Vakıfbank
Best Server	(Turkey) Asuman Karakoyun	Eczacıbaşı VitrA
Best Setter	(Turkey) Naz Aydemir	Vakıfbank
Best Receiver	(Turkey) Gözde Kırdar	Vakıfbank
Best Libero	(Turkey) Gülden Kayalar	Eczacıbaşı VitrA
