= 2021–22 CEV Women's Champions League =

- League: CEV Women's Champions League
- Sport: Volleyball
- Duration: Qualifying round: 21 September – 4 November 2021; Main tournament: 23 November 2021 – 2022
- Number of teams: 28 (10 qual. + 18 main tourn.)
- Finals champions: (Turkey) Vakifbank Istanbul
- Runners-up: (Italy) Imoco Volley Conegliano
- Finals MVP: (Brazil) Gabriela Guimarães

CEV Women's Champions League seasons
- ← 2020–21 2022–23 →

The 2021–22 CEV Women's Champions League was the 62nd edition of the highest level European volleyball club competition organised by the European Volleyball Confederation.

== Qualification ==
Rank	Country	No. teams			Qualified teams
Rank	Country	Vac	Qual	Total	Qualified teams
1	Turkey	3	–	3	VakifBank Istanbul
1	Turkey	3	–	3	Fenerbahçe Opet Istanbul
1	Turkey	3	–	3	THY Istanbul
2	Italy	3	–	3	A. Carraro Imoco Conegliano
2	Italy	3	–	3	Igor Gorgonzola Novara
2	Italy	3	–	3	Vero Volley Monza
3	Russia	3	–	3	Lokomotiv Kaliningrad
3	Russia	3	–	3	Dinamo Moscow
3	Russia	3	–	3	Dinamo-AK Bars Kazan
4	Poland	2	–	2	Grupa Azoty Chemik Police
4	Poland	2	–	2	Developres SkyRes Rzeszów
5	France	2	–	2	ASPTT Mulhouse
5	France	2	–	2	Béziers Volley
7	Germany	1	–	1	Dresdner SC
8	Bulgaria	1	–	1	Maritza Plovdiv
9	Finland	1	–	1	LP Salo
10	Czech Republic	1	–	1	Dukla Liberec
11	Hungary	1	–	1	Fatum Nyíregyháza
17	Ukraine	–	1	1	SC Prometey
18	Serbia	–	1	1	ŽOK Ub

== Pools composition ==
Drawing of Lots was held on 24 September 2021 in Ljubljana.

== League round ==
- 20 teams compete in the league round
- The teams are split into 5 groups, each one featuring four teams
- Winner of each pool and best three second placed teams advance to the quarterfinals
- All times are local

=== Pool A ===
Pos	Team	Pld	W	L	Pts	SW	SL	SR	SPW	SPL	SPR	Qualification
1	(Poland) Developres SkyRes Rzeszów	6	5	1	13	15	8	1.875	521	467	1.116	Quarterfinals
2	(Russia) Lokomotiv Kaliningrad	6	4	2	13	15	7	2.143	516	472	1.093	Quarterfinals
3	(Germany) Dresdner SC	6	3	3	9	11	13	0.846	500	532	0.940	
4	(Ukraine) SC Prometey	6	0	6	1	4	18	0.222	476	541	0.880	

Date	Time		Score		Set 1	Set 2	Set 3	Set 4	Set 5	Total	Report
23 Nov	19:00	Lokomotiv Kaliningrad (Russia)	3–0	(Ukraine) SC Prometey	25–21	25–19	25–23			75–63	Report
23 Nov	18:00	Developres SkyRes Rzeszów (Poland)	3–2	(Germany) Dresdner SC	25–10	19–25	25–15	22–25	15–9	106–84	Report
8 Dec	19:00	Dresdner SC (Germany)	0–3	(Russia) Lokomotiv Kaliningrad	20–25	17–25	19–25			56–75	Report
7 Dec	19:00	SC Prometey (Ukraine)	1–3	(Poland) Developres SkyRes Rzeszów	20–25	14–25	25–21	17–25		76–96	Report
21 Dec	18:00	Developres SkyRes Rzeszów (Poland)	3–2	(Russia) Lokomotiv Kaliningrad	25–17	22–25	25–21	17–25	16–14	105–102	Report
22 Dec	19:00	SC Prometey (Ukraine)	2–3	(Germany) Dresdner SC	25–16	16–25	25–16	14–25	15–17	95–99	Report
18 Jan	19:00	Lokomotiv Kaliningrad (Russia)	1–3	(Germany) Dresdner SC	25–21	20–25	22–25	22–25		89–96	Report
18 Jan	18:00	Developres SkyRes Rzeszów (Poland)	3–0	(Ukraine) SC Prometey	25–22	25–23	25–17			75–62	Report
3 Feb	19:00	SC Prometey (Ukraine)	1–3	(Russia) Lokomotiv Kaliningrad	18–25	25–27	25–19	21–25		89–96	Report
2 Feb	19:00	Dresdner SC (Germany)	0–3	(Poland) Developres SkyRes Rzeszów	19–25	22–25	24–26			65–76	Report
15 Feb	19:00	Lokomotiv Kaliningrad (Russia)	3–0	(Poland) Developres SkyRes Rzeszów	28–26	25–19	25–18			78–63	Report
15 Feb	19:00	Dresdner SC (Germany)	3–1	(Ukraine) SC Prometey	25–22	25–27	25–23	25–19		100–91	Report

=== Pool B ===
Pos	Team	Pld	W	L	Pts	SW	SL	SR	SPW	SPL	SPR	Qualification
1	(Turkey) VakifBank Istanbul	6	6	0	18	18	2	9.000	494	353	1.399	Quarterfinals
2	(Italy) Vero Volley Monza	6	4	2	12	14	6	2.333	456	408	1.118	Quarterfinals
3	(France) ASPTT Mulhouse	6	1	5	3	4	16	0.250	402	469	0.857	
4	(Finland) LP Salo	6	1	5	3	4	16	0.250	368	490	0.751	

Date	Time		Score		Set 1	Set 2	Set 3	Set 4	Set 5	Total	Report
24 Nov	19:00	VakifBank Istanbul (Turkey)	3–1	(Italy) Vero Volley Monza	23–25	25–23	25–16	25–21		98–85	Report
23 Nov	19:00	ASPTT Mulhouse (France)	3–1	(Finland) LP Salo	23–25	25–14	25–14	25–19		98–72	Report
9 Dec	19:00	LP Salo (Finland)	0–3	(Turkey) VakifBank Istanbul	14–25	11–25	17–25			42–75	Report
8 Dec	19:30	Vero Volley Monza (Italy)	3–0	(France) ASPTT Mulhouse	25–20	25–17	25–12			75–49	Report
22 Dec	19:00	ASPTT Mulhouse (France)	0–3	(Turkey) VakifBank Istanbul	19–25	19–25	17–25			55–75	Report
21 Dec	19:00	Vero Volley Monza (Italy)	3–0	(Finland) LP Salo	25–13	25–23	25–14			75–50	Report
20 Jan	19:00	VakifBank Istanbul (Turkey)	3–0	(Finland) LP Salo	25–9	25–21	25–20			75–50	Report
19 Jan	19:30	ASPTT Mulhouse (France)	0–3	(Italy) Vero Volley Monza	18–25	22–25	18–25			58–75	Report
3 Feb	19:00	Vero Volley Monza (Italy)	1–3	(Turkey) VakifBank Istanbul	25–21	17–25	17–25	12–25		71–96	Report
3 Feb	19:00	LP Salo (Finland)	3–1	(France) ASPTT Mulhouse	25–19	25–21	18–25	29–27		97–92	Report
15 Feb	17:00	VakifBank Istanbul (Turkey)	3–0	(France) ASPTT Mulhouse	25–11	25–18	25–21			75–50	Report
15 Feb	18:00	LP Salo (Finland)	0–3	(Italy) Vero Volley Monza	21–25	13–25	23–25			57–75	Report

=== Pool C ===
Pos	Team	Pld	W	L	Pts	SW	SL	SR	SPW	SPL	SPR	Qualification
1	(Russia) Dinamo Moscow	6	5	1	13	15	7	2.143	489	459	1.065	Quarterfinals
2	(Italy) Igor Gorgonzola Novara	6	4	2	12	13	6	2.167	449	392	1.145	
3	(Turkey) THY Istanbul	6	3	3	10	13	12	1.083	543	515	1.054	
4	(Czech Republic) Dukla Liberec	6	0	6	1	2	18	0.111	364	479	0.760	

Date	Time		Score		Set 1	Set 2	Set 3	Set 4	Set 5	Total	Report
25 Nov	20:00	Igor Gorgonzola Novara (Italy)	3–0	(Turkey) THY Istanbul	25–21	25–22	26–24			76–67	Report
23 Nov	19:00	Dinamo Moscow (Russia)	3–0	(Czech Republic) Dukla Liberec	25–19	25–19	25–20			75–58	Report
7 Dec	20:00	Dukla Liberec (Czech Republic)	0–3	(Italy) Igor Gorgonzola Novara	11–25	16–25	19–25			46–75	Report
8 Dec	18:00	THY Istanbul (Turkey)	2–3	(Russia) Dinamo Moscow	23–25	25–16	17–25	25–19	9–15	99–100	Report
23 Dec	19:00	Dinamo Moscow (Russia)	0–3	(Italy) Igor Gorgonzola Novara	20–25	21–25	23–25			64–75	Report
21 Dec	18:00	THY Istanbul (Turkey)	3–0	(Czech Republic) Dukla Liberec	25–18	25–15	25–22			75–55	Report
20 Jan	20:00	Igor Gorgonzola Novara (Italy)	3–0	(Czech Republic) Dukla Liberec	25–12	25–23	25–13			75–48	Report
19 Jan	19:00	Dinamo Moscow (Russia)	3–2	(Turkey) THY Istanbul	16–25	26–24	25–19	18–25	15–13	100–106	Report
2 Feb	18:00	THY Istanbul (Turkey)	3–1	(Italy) Igor Gorgonzola Novara	25–21	17–25	25–23	25–16		92–85	Report
13 Feb	18:00	Dukla Liberec (Czech Republic)	0–3	(Russia) Dinamo Moscow	13–25	22–25	23–25			58–75	Report
15 Feb	21:00	Igor Gorgonzola Novara (Italy)	0–3	(Russia) Dinamo Moscow	19–25	22–25	22–25			63–75	Report
15 Feb	20:00	Dukla Liberec (Czech Republic)	2–3	(Turkey) THY Istanbul	25–23	25–16	16–25	23–25	10–15	99–104	Report

=== Pool D ===
Pos	Team	Pld	W	L	Pts	SW	SL	SR	SPW	SPL	SPR	Qualification
1	(Turkey) Fenerbahçe Opet Istanbul	6	6	0	17	18	3	6.000	498	385	1.294	Quarterfinals
2	(Russia) Dinamo-AK Bars Kazan	6	4	2	13	14	7	2.000	478	415	1.152	Quarterfinals
3	(France) Béziers Volley	6	2	4	5	7	14	0.500	422	486	0.868	
4	(Bulgaria) Maritza Plovdiv	6	0	6	1	3	18	0.167	392	503	0.779	

Date	Time		Score		Set 1	Set 2	Set 3	Set 4	Set 5	Total	Report
25 Nov	19:00	Fenerbahçe Opet Istanbul (Turkey)	3–2	(Russia) Dinamo-AK Bars Kazan	15–25	22–25	25–17	25–21	15–7	102–95	Report
24 Nov	20:00	Béziers Volley (France)	3–0	(Bulgaria) Maritza Plovdiv	25–21	25–20	25–16			75–57	Report
8 Dec	19:00	Maritza Plovdiv (Bulgaria)	1–3	(Turkey) Fenerbahçe Opet Istanbul	14–25	25–20	23–25	15–25		77–95	Report
7 Dec	19:00	Dinamo-AK Bars Kazan (Russia)	3–1	(France) Béziers Volley	22–25	25–23	25–18	25–17		97–83	Report
23 Dec	19:00	Béziers Volley (France)	0–3	(Turkey) Fenerbahçe Opet Istanbul	24–26	15–25	22–25			61–76	Report
21 Dec	19:00	Dinamo-AK Bars Kazan (Russia)	3–0	(Bulgaria) Maritza Plovdiv	25–10	25–21	25–20			75–51	Report
19 Jan	19:00	Fenerbahçe Opet Istanbul (Turkey)	3–0	(Bulgaria) Maritza Plovdiv	25–22	25–11	25–14			75–47	Report
18 Jan	20:00	Béziers Volley (France)	0–3	(Russia) Dinamo-AK Bars Kazan	12–25	17–25	21–25			50–75	Report
11 Feb	19:00	Dinamo-AK Bars Kazan (Russia)	0–3	(Turkey) Fenerbahçe Opet Istanbul	20–25	22–25	19–25			61–75	Report
1 Feb	19:00	Maritza Plovdiv (Bulgaria)	2–3	(France) Béziers Volley	27–29	25–23	17–25	25–16	12–15	106–108	Report
15 Feb	20:00	Fenerbahçe Opet Istanbul (Turkey)	3–0	(France) Béziers Volley	25–8	25–17	25–19			75–44	Report
15 Feb	19:00	Maritza Plovdiv (Bulgaria)	0–3	(Russia) Dinamo-AK Bars Kazan	15–25	19–25	20–25			54–75	Report

=== Pool E ===
Pos	Team	Pld	W	L	Pts	SW	SL	SR	SPW	SPL	SPR	Qualification
1	(Italy) A. Carraro Imoco Conegliano	6	6	0	18	18	0	MAX	452	256	1.766	Quarterfinals
2	(Poland) Grupa Azoty Chemik Police	6	4	2	12	12	7	1.714	433	368	1.177	
3	(Serbia) ŽOK Ub	6	2	4	6	7	12	0.583	381	441	0.864	
4	(Hungary) Fatum Nyíregyháza	6	0	6	0	0	18	0.000	250	450	0.556	

Date	Time		Score		Set 1	Set 2	Set 3	Set 4	Set 5	Total	Report
24 Nov	19:30	A. Carraro Imoco Conegliano (Italy)	3–0	(Serbia) ŽOK Ub	25–8	27–25	25–16			77–49	Report
24 Nov	18:00	Grupa Azoty Chemik Police (Poland)	3–0	(Hungary) Fatum Nyíregyháza	25–11	25–13	25–14			75–38	Report
8 Dec	18:00	ŽOK Ub (Serbia)	1–3	(Poland) Grupa Azoty Chemik Police	20–25	25–18	20–25	16–25		81–93	Report
9 Dec	18:00	Fatum Nyíregyháza (Hungary)	0–3	(Italy) A. Carraro Imoco Conegliano	18–25	13–25	11–25			42–75	Report
23 Dec	18:00	Grupa Azoty Chemik Police (Poland)	0–3	(Italy) A. Carraro Imoco Conegliano	21–25	19–25	11–25			51–75	Report
22 Dec	18:00	ŽOK Ub (Serbia)	3–0	(Hungary) Fatum Nyíregyháza	25–21	25–20	25–23			75–64	Report
26 Jan	20:30	A. Carraro Imoco Conegliano (Italy)	3–0	(Hungary) Fatum Nyíregyháza	25–0	25–0	25–0			75–0	Report
20 Jan	18:00	Grupa Azoty Chemik Police (Poland)	3–0	(Serbia) ŽOK Ub	25–17	25–19	25–14			75–50	Report
2 Feb	18:00	ŽOK Ub (Serbia)	0–3	(Italy) A. Carraro Imoco Conegliano	16–25	22–25	13–25			51–75	Report
3 Feb	18:00	Fatum Nyíregyháza (Hungary)	0–3	(Poland) Grupa Azoty Chemik Police	18–25	18–25	13–25			49–75	Report
15 Feb	19:30	A. Carraro Imoco Conegliano (Italy)	3–0	(Poland) Grupa Azoty Chemik Police	25–19	25–22	25–22			75–63	Report
15 Feb	18:00	Fatum Nyíregyháza (Hungary)	0–3	(Serbia) ŽOK Ub	19–25	21–25	17–25			57–75	Report

=== Second place ranking ===
Pos	Team	Pld	W	L	Pts	SW	SL	SR	SPW	SPL	SPR	Qualification
1	(Russia) Lokomotiv Kaliningrad	6	4	2	13	15	7	2.143	516	472	1.093	Quarterfinals
2	(Russia) Dinamo-AK Bars Kazan	6	4	2	13	14	7	2.000	478	415	1.152	Quarterfinals
3	(Italy) Vero Volley Monza	6	4	2	12	14	6	2.333	456	408	1.118	Quarterfinals
4	(Italy) Igor Gorgonzola Novara	6	4	2	12	13	6	2.167	449	392	1.145	
5	(Poland) Grupa Azoty Chemik Police	6	4	2	12	12	7	1.714	433	368	1.177	

== Playoffs ==
- All times are local

=== Quarterfinals ===
Pot 1	Pot 2
A. Carraro Imoco Conegliano; VakifBank Istanbul; Fenerbahçe Opet Istanbul; Dinamo Moscow	Developres SkyRes Rzeszów; Lokomotiv Kaliningrad; Dinamo-AK Bars Kazan; Vero Volley Monza

Team 1	Agg.	Team 2	1st leg	2nd leg
Dinamo-AK Bars Kazan (Russia)	–	(Russia) Dinamo Moscow	–	–
Vero Volley Monza (Italy)	0–6	(Italy) A. Carraro Imoco Conegliano	0–3	1–3
Developres SkyRes Rzeszów (Poland)	2–4	(Turkey) VakifBank Istanbul	3–2	1–3
Lokomotiv Kaliningrad (Russia)	0–6	(Turkey) Fenerbahçe Opet Istanbul	W.O.	W.O.

==== First leg ====
Date	Time		Score		Set 1	Set 2	Set 3	Set 4	Set 5	Total	Report
		Dinamo-AK Bars Kazan (Russia)	–	(Russia) Dinamo Moscow	–	–	–			0–0	
9 Mar	20:30	Vero Volley Monza (Italy)	0–3	(Italy) A. Carraro Imoco Conegliano	21–25	21–25	19–25			61–75	Report
8 Mar	17:30	Developres SkyRes Rzeszów (Poland)	3–2	(Turkey) VakifBank Istanbul	13–25	29–27	19–25	29–27	15–13	105–117	Report

==== Second leg ====
Date	Time		Score		Set 1	Set 2	Set 3	Set 4	Set 5	Total	Report
		Dinamo Moscow (Russia)	–	(Russia) Dinamo-AK Bars Kazan	–	–	–			0–0	
17 Mar	20:30	A. Carraro Imoco Conegliano (Italy)	3–1	(Italy) Vero Volley Monza	25–19	22–25	25–16	25-17		97–60	Report
16 Mar	18:00	VakifBank Istanbul (Turkey)	3–1	(Poland) Developres SkyRes Rzeszów	25–15	25–19	23–25	25–23		98–82	Report

=== Semifinals ===
Team 1	Agg.	Team 2	1st leg	2nd leg	Golden Set
(Russia)	0–6	(Italy) A. Carraro Imoco Conegliano	W.O.	W.O.	
VakifBank Istanbul (Turkey)	3–3	(Turkey) Fenerbahçe Opet Istanbul	3–1	0–3	15–11

==== First leg ====
Date	Time		Score		Set 1	Set 2	Set 3	Set 4	Set 5	Total	Report
		(Russia)	–	(Italy) A. Carraro Imoco Conegliano	0–25	0–25	0–25			0–75	
31 Mar	19:00	VakifBank Istanbul (Turkey)	3–1	(Turkey) Fenerbahçe Opet Istanbul	25–21	25–20	22–25	25–18		97–84	Report

==== Second leg ====
Date	Time		Score		Set 1	Set 2	Set 3	Set 4	Set 5	Total	Report
		A. Carraro Imoco Conegliano (Italy)	–	(Russia)	25–0	25–0	25–0			75–0	
6 Apr	19:00	Fenerbahçe Opet Istanbul (Turkey)	3–0	(Turkey) VakifBank Istanbul	25–14	25–20	28–26			78–60	Report
Golden set		Fenerbahçe Opet Istanbul (Turkey)	11–15	(Turkey) VakifBank Istanbul							

=== Final ===
Date	Time		Score		Set 1	Set 2	Set 3	Set 4	Set 5	Total	Report
22 May	18:00	A. Carraro Imoco Conegliano (Italy)	1–3	(Turkey) VakifBank Istanbul	22–25	21–25	25–23	21–25		89–98	Report
