= Galatasaray women's volleyball team past rosters =

This article contains past rosters of the Galatasaray S.K. (women's volleyball) team.

== 1970 Era ==
=== 1970–71 ===
Roster

- (Turkey) Selcan Çağlar

=== 1971–72 ===
Roster

- (Turkey) Selcan Çağlar

=== 1972–73 ===
Roster

- (Turkey) Selcan Çağlar

=== 1973–74 ===
Roster

- (Turkey) Deniz Dosdoğru
- (Turkey) Selcan Çağlar

=== 1974–75 ===
Roster

- (Turkey) Deniz Dosdoğru
- (Turkey) Selcan Çağlar

=== 1975–76 ===
Roster

- (Turkey) Deniz Dosdoğru

=== 1976–77 ===
Roster

- (Turkey) Deniz Dosdoğru

=== 1977–78 ===
Roster

- (Turkey) Deniz Dosdoğru
- (Turkey) Violet Duca

=== 1978–79 ===
Roster

- (Turkey) Deniz Dosdoğru

== 1980 Era ==
=== 1985–86 ===
Roster

- (Turkey) Ebru
- (Turkey) Elif
- (Turkey) Deniz
- (Turkey) Didem
- (Turkey) Figen
- (Turkey) İdil
- (Turkey) Nesteren
- (Turkey) Seda
- (Turkey) Sevda
- (Turkey) Sırma
- (Turkey) Sıdıka
- (Turkey) Sibel
- (Turkey) Ümit

=== 1986–87 ===
Roster

- (Turkey) Ayşe
- (Turkey) Billur
- (Turkey) Deniz
- (Turkey) Didem
- (Turkey) Elif
- (Turkey) İpek
- (Turkey) İdil
- (Turkey) Oya
- (Turkey) Özge
- (Turkey) Seda
- (Turkey) Ümit

=== 1987–88 ===
Roster

- (Turkey) Arzu
- (Germany) Barbara English
- (Turkey) Billur
- (Turkey) Deniz
- (Turkey) Didem
- (Turkey) Elif
- (Turkey) Hamiyet Demircioğlu
- (Turkey) İpek
- (Turkey) Nalan Ural
- (Turkey) Sonay Gülergin
- (Turkey) Ümit

=== 1988–89 ===
Roster

- (Turkey) Didem
- (Turkey) Esra Temelli
- (Turkey) Elif
- (Turkey) Macide Top
- (Turkey) Nalan Ural
- (Turkey) Nilgün
- (Turkey) Pınar Erel
- (Czechoslovakia) Sona
- (Turkey) Sonay Gülergin
- (Turkey) Ümit

=== 1989–90 ===
Roster

- (Turkey) Aycan Gökberk
- (Turkey) Didem
- (Turkey) Esra Temelli
- (Turkey) Macide Top
- (Turkey) Nilgün
- (Turkey) Nevin
- (Turkey) Pınar Erel
- (Czechoslovakia) Sona
- (Turkey) Serap
- (Turkey) Yeşim
- (Turkey) Zeynep
- Coach: (Turkey) Mehmet Bedestenlioğlu

== 1990 Era ==
=== 1990–91 ===
Roster

- (Turkey) Arzu
- (Turkey) Dilek
- (Turkey) Duygu
- (Turkey) Esra Temelli
- (Turkey) Filiz
- (Czechoslovakia) Jana Tahuova
- (Turkey) Nurcihan Bilir
- (Turkey) Nevin
- (Turkey) Nihal
- (Turkey) Pınar
- (Turkey) Sevinç
- (Socialist Federal Republic of Yugoslavia) Slavica Cambiroza
- Coach: (Turkey) Mehmet Bedestenlioğlu

=== 1991–92 ===
Roster

- (Turkey) Arzu
- (Turkey) Banu İnan
- (Turkey) Banu Karatekin
- (Turkey) Duygu
- (Turkey) Dilek Ayal
- (Turkey) Dilek Girpan
- (Turkey) Devran
- (Turkey) Eda
- (Turkey) Ebru
- (Albania) Hidri Enkelejda
- (Turkey) Nihal
- (Turkey) Özlem
- (Turkey) Pınar
- (Turkey) Senem
- Coach: (Turkey) Mehmet Bedestenlioğlu

=== 1992–93 ===
Roster

- (Turkey) Arzu Göllü
- (Turkey) Banu
- (Turkey) Dilek
- (Turkey) Devran
- (Turkey) Duygu
- (Turkey) Ebru Algür
- (Turkey) Ebru
- (Turkey) Fidan Başak
- (Czech Republic) Karolína Koloušková Myslíková
- (Turkey) Nihal
- (Turkey) Özlem
- (Turkey) Senem
- Coach: (Turkey) Mehmet Bedestenlioğlu

=== 1993–94 ===
Roster

- (Turkey) Arzu Göllü
- (Turkey) Ayşe Halıcıoğlu
- (Turkey) Dilek
- (Turkey) Devran
- (Turkey) Ebru Algür
- (Turkey) Fidan Başak
- (Czech Republic) Karolína Koloušková Myslíková
- (Turkey) Nihal
- (Ukraine) Olga Gaydayenko
- (Turkey) Özlem
- (Russia) Vera Rakunin
- (Turkey) Zeynep Özdemir
- Coach: (Turkey) Cengiz Göllü

=== 1994–95 ===
Roster

- (Turkey) Ayşe Halıcıoğlu
- (Turkey) Burçin Fertelli
- (Turkey) Berna
- (Turkey) Banu
- (Turkey) Devran
- (Turkey) Dilek
- (Ukraine) Elena Stefanovich
- (Turkey) Fidan Başak
- (Turkey) Funda
- (China) Hu Wen Yue
- (Turkey) Nihal
- (Turkey) Özlem
- (Turkey) Zeynep Özdemir
- Coach: (Turkey) Cengiz Göllü

=== 1995–96 ===
Roster

- (Turkey) Arzu Göllü
- (Turkey) Ayşe Halıcıoğlu
- (Turkey) Burçin Fertelli
- (Turkey) Funda
- (Russia) (Turkey) Inessa Korkmaz
- (Russia) Irina Ilchenko
- (Turkey) Larissa Kapazistina Kızılca
- (Turkey) Nihal
- (Turkey) Sonay Gülergin
- (Turkey) Vildan Layic
- (Turkey) Zeynep Özdemir
- Coach: (Turkey) Cengiz Göllü

=== 1996–97 ===
Roster

- (Turkey) Arzu Göllü
- (Turkey) Ayşe Halıcıoğlu
- (Turkey) Banu Inan
- (Turkey) Burçin Fertelli
- (Belarus) Elena Lik
- (Russia) Irina Ilchenko
- (Turkey) Neslihan Turan
- (Turkey) Sonay Gülergin
- (Turkey) Vildan Layic
- (Russia) Yuliya Khamitova
- (Turkey) Zeynep Özdemir
- Coach: (Turkey) Cengiz Göllü / (Turkey) Mehmet Bedestenlioğlu

=== 1997–98 ===
Roster

- (Turkey) Ayşe Halıcıoğlu
- (Turkey) Burçin Fertelli
- (Turkey) Deniz Paşaoğlu
- (Belarus) Elena Lik
- (Russia) Irina Smirnova-Ilchenko
- (Russia) Marina Pankova
- (Turkey) Nazan Uzunbay
- (Turkey) Neslihan Turan
- (Turkey) Özge Akıncıbay
- (Turkey) Özlem Stanicki
- (Turkey) Vildan Layic
- (Turkey) Zeynep Özdemir
- Coach: (Turkey) Mehmet Bedestenlioğlu

=== 1998–99 ===
Roster

- (Turkey) Ayşen Mete
- (Turkey) Burcu Elaman
- (Turkey) Burçin Fertelli
- (Turkey) Doğa Hor Tekin
- (Belarus) Elena Lik
- (Bulgaria) Emiliya Pachova
- (Turkey) Güzin Teksoy
- (Russia) Marina Pankova
- (Turkey) Nazan Uzunbay
- (Turkey) Neslihan Turan
- (Turkey) Özge Akıncıbay
- (Turkey) Özlem Stanicki
- (Bulgaria) Penka Natova
- (Turkey) Pınar Müezzinler
- (Turkey) Zeynep Özdemir
- Coach: (Turkey) Mehmet Bedestenlioğlu

=== 1999–00 ===
Roster

- (Turkey) Ayşen Mete
- (Turkey) Burcu Elaman
- (Turkey) Deniz Yürük
- (Turkey) Doğa Hor Tekin
- (Belarus) Elena Lik
- (Bulgaria) Emiliya Pachova
- (Turkey) Neslihan Turan
- (Turkey) Özlem Stanicki
- (Turkey) Pınar Müezzinler
- (Turkey) Tuba Meto Kepenek
- (Ukraine) Yuliya Buyeva
- Coach: (Cuba) Eugenio George Lafita

== 2000 Era ==
=== 2000–01 ===
Roster

- (Russia) Alevtina Tcherepanova
- (Turkey) Burcu Elaman
- (Turkey) Deniz Yürük
- (Turkey) Doğa Hor Tekin
- (Turkey) Elçin Şenyurt
- (Belarus) Elena Lik
- (Turkey) Handan Temiz
- (Turkey) İzolda Körfez
- (Ukraine) Julia Malish
- (Turkey) Neslihan Turan
- (Turkey) Nihal Özer
- (Turkey) Pınar Müezzinler
- (Turkey) Zehra Yaman
- Coach: (Turkey) Gökhan Edman

=== 2001–02 ===
Roster

- (Russia) Alevtina Tcherepanova
- (Turkey) Burcu Elaman
- (North Macedonia) Carla Dimoska
- (Turkey) Deniz Yürük
- (Turkey) Doğa Hor Tekin
- (Turkey) Elçin Şenyurt
- (Turkey) Handan Temiz
- (Turkey) İzolda Körfez
- (Ukraine) Julia Malish
- (Turkey) Neslihan Turan
- (Turkey) Nihal Özer
- (Turkey) Pınar Müezzinler
- (Turkey) Serpil Erdem
- (Turkey) Zehra Yaman
- Coach: (Turkey) Gökhan Edman

=== 2002–03 ===
Roster

- (Turkey) Doğa Hor Tekin
- (Turkey) Elçin Şenyurt
- (Turkey) Handan Temiz
- (Turkey) İpek Soroğlu
- (Ukraine) Julia Malish
- (Turkey) Neslihan Turan
- (Turkey) Nihal Özer
- (Turkey) Pınar Müezzinler
- (Turkey) Serpil Erdem
- (Latvia) Viktorija Brice
- (Turkey) Zehra Yaman

=== 2003–04 ===
Roster

- (Turkey) Neslihan Turan

- Galatasaray withdrew from the league because it decided to close the volleyball branch.

=== 2004–05 ===
Roster

- (Turkey) Deniz Emen
- (Turkey) Neslihan Turan
- Coach: (Turkey) Gökhan Rahman Çokşen

=== 2005–06 ===
Roster

- (Turkey) Banu Boytüzün
- (Turkey) Banu Toktamış
- (Turkey) Berat Seda Küçük
- (Turkey) Burçin Fertelli
- (Turkey) Ceyda Yerli
- (Turkey) Deniz Emen
- (Turkey) Ferda Bulut
- (Turkey) Neslihan Turan
- (Ukraine) Olga Petrashko
- (Turkey) Sibel Küçük
- (Kazakhstan) Tatyana Mudritskaya Georgiou
- (Croatia) Vesna Jelić
- (Ukraine) Yanina Yakovlyeva
- (Turkey) Zeynep Saygı
- (Turkey) Zeynep Seda Uslu
- Coach: (Turkey) Gökhan Rahman Çokşen
- Assistant Coach: (Turkey) Erhan Doğanöz

=== 2006–07 ===
Roster

- (Turkey) Ayça Naz İhtiyaroğlu
- (Turkey) Banu Boytüzün
- (Turkey) Başak Koç
- (Turkey) Berna Sezer
- (Turkey) Burçin Fertelli
- (Turkey) Didem Özdemir
- (Turkey) Dilara Bilge
- (Turkey) Emel Kaplan
- (Turkey) Ferda Bulut
- (Sweden) Malin Eriksson Gallardo
- (Turkey) Neslihan Turan
- (Peru) Patricia Soto
- (Kazakhstan) Tatyana Mudritskaya Georgiou
- Coach: (Turkey) Gökhan Rahman Çokşen

=== 2007–08 ===
Roster

- (Turkey) Aslıhan Köyel
- (Turkey) Bahar Ekinci
- (Turkey) Başak Koç
- (United States) Brittany Hochevar
- (Turkey) Büşra Izal
- (Turkey) Dilara Sağbaş
- (Brazil) Elizabeth Hintemann
- (Turkey) Ferda Bulut
- (Turkey) Gülen Erman
- (Turkey) Hatice Sungur
- (Turkey) Heval Alp
- (Turkey) Neslihan Turan
- (Turkey) Serap Çalıkuşu
- (Turkey) Tuğçe Çelik
- (Ukraine) Youlia Kovtun
- Coach: (Turkey) Ahmet Reşat Arığ / (Turkey) Mehmet Bedestenlioğlu

=== 2008–09 ===
Roster

- (Turkey) Ayşe Melis Gürkaynak
- (Turkey) Bahar Ekinci
- (Turkey) Ceren Mengüç
- (Turkey) Dilara Bilge
- (Turkey) Emel Kaplan
- (Turkey) Gizem Güreşen
- (United States) Keao Burdine
- (Serbia) Nataša Krsmanović
- (Turkey) Neslihan Turan
- (United States) Ogonna Nnamani
- (Turkey) Seray Altay
- (Canada) Stacey Jiggins
- (Turkey) Tuba Meto Kepenek
- (Turkey) Tuğçe Çelik
- Coach: (Turkey) Gökhan Edman
- Assistant Coach: (Turkey) Ataman Güneyligil

=== 2009–10 ===
Roster

- (Turkey) Ayça Naz İhtiyaroğlu
- (Turkey) Bahanur Şahin Gökalp
- (Turkey) Burcu Bircan
- (Turkey) Ceren Mengüç
- (Turkey) Deniz Hakyemez
- (Turkey) Dilara Bilge
- (Turkey) Elif Ağca
- (Turkey) Ebru Elhan
- (Turkey) Gözde Dal İrgi
- (Serbia) Ivana Đerisilo
- (Serbia) Nataša Krsmanović
- (Turkey) Nedime Elif Yarar
- (Turkey) Neslihan Turan
- (Turkey) Özlem Özçelik
- (Turkey) Serpil Dönmez
- (Brazil) Valeska Menezes
- Coach: (Turkey) Gökhan Edman
- Assistant Coach: (Turkey) Ataman Güneyligil

== 2010 Era ==
=== 2010–11 ===
Roster

- (Turkey) Arzu Göllü
- (Turkey) Ayşe Gökçen Denkel
- (Turkey) Deniz Hakyemez
- (Turkey) Dilara Bilge
- (Turkey) Ebru Elhan
- (Brazil) Érika Coimbra
- (Turkey) Ezgi Arslan
- (Turkey) Funda Bilgi
- (Turkey) Gamze Alikaya
- (Turkey) Gözde Dal İrgi
- (Serbia) Ivana Đerisilo
- (Puerto Rico) Karina Ocasio
- (Turkey) Özlem Özçelik
- (Turkey) Seniye Merve Dalbeler Aslan
- (Serbia) Vesna Čitaković
- (Turkey) Zeynep Seda Uslu
- Coach: (Turkey) Gökhan Edman

=== 2011–12 ===
Roster

- (Turkey) Aslı Türker
- (Turkey) Ayşe Gökçen Denkel
- (Turkey) Bihter Dumanoğlu
- (Turkey) Buse İnce
- (Turkey) Deniz Hakyemez
- (Turkey) Derya Çayırgan
- (Turkey) Dilara Bilge
- (Turkey) Ecem Alıcı
- (Italy) Eleonora Lo Bianco
- (Turkey) Funda Bilgi
- (Turkey) Gamze Alikaya
- (Croatia) Marina Miletić
- (Russia) (Turkey) Natalia Hanikoğlu
- (Turkey) Nilay Konar
- (Cuba) Rosir Calderón
- (Turkey) Selime İlyasoğlu
- (Turkey) Seray Altay
- (Serbia) Slađana Erić
- Coach: (Serbia) Dragan Nešić
- Assistant Coach: (Turkey) Ahmet Reşat Arığ
- Assistant Coach: (Turkey) Ataman Güneyligil

=== 2012–13 ===
Roster

- (Turkey) Bihter Dumanoğlu
- (Serbia) Brižitka Molnar
- (Turkey) Burcu Bircan Evin
- (Turkey) Buse İnce
- (Turkey) Cansu Aydınoğulları
- (Turkey) Derya Çayırgan
- (Turkey) Dilara Bilge
- (Turkey) Ecem Alıcı
- (Italy) Eleonora Lo Bianco
- (Turkey) Ezgi Arslan
- (Turkey) Gamze Alikaya
- (Turkey) Necla Esepaşa Güçlü
- (Turkey) Neriman Özsoy
- (Turkey) Nilay Konar
- (Turkey) Özgenur Yurtdagülen
- (Cuba) Rosir Calderón
- (Turkey) Selime İlyasoğlu
- (Turkey) Seray Aksoy Gurle
- (Italy) Simona Gioli
- (Turkey) Sinem Barut
- (Japan) Yūko Sano
- Coach: (Italy) Massimo Barbolini
- Assistant Coach: (Turkey) Ataman Güneyligil

=== 2013–14 ===
Roster

- (Turkey) Aslı Kalaç
- (Turkey) Bihter Dumanoğlu
- (Bulgaria) Dobriana Rabadžieva
- (Italy) Eleonora Lo Bianco
- (Turkey) Ergül Avcı Eroğlu
- (Turkey) Ezgi Arslan
- (Turkey) Gamze Alikaya
- (Colombia) Madelaynne Montaño
- (Turkey) Neriman Özsoy
- (Turkey) Nihan Güneyligil
- (Turkey) Nursevil Gökbudak
- (Turkey) Pelin Beydüz
- (Japan) Saori Kimura
- (Turkey) Sinem Barut
- (Serbia) Stefana Veljković
- Coach: (Italy) Massimo Barbolini
- Assistant Coach: (Turkey) Ataman Güneyligil

=== 2014–15 ===
Roster

- (Turkey) Ada Germen Korkmaz
- (Turkey) Aslı Kalaç
- (Turkey) Ayşe Melis Gürkaynak
- (Turkey) Bihter Dumanoğlu
- (Italy) Caterina Bosetti
- (Turkey) Duygu Güncü
- (Turkey) Ezgi Arslan
- (Netherlands) Floortje Meijners
- (Turkey) Gamze Alikaya
- (Italy) Nadia Centoni
- (Turkey) Nihan Güneyligil
- (Turkey) Nursevil Gökbudak
- (Turkey) Özgenur Yurtdagülen
- (Turkey) Pelin Beydüz
- (Turkey) Yağmur Mislina Kılıç
- Coach: (Italy) Massimo Barbolini
- Assistant Coach: (Turkey) Ataman Güneyligil

=== 2015–16 ===
Roster

- (Turkey) Ada Germen Korkmaz
- (Turkey) Aslı Kalaç
- (Turkey) Bihter Dumanoğlu
- (Belgium) Charlotte Leys
- (United States) Cursty Jackson
- (Turkey) Ezgi Arslan
- (Turkey) Gamze Alikaya
- (Turkey) Güldeniz Önal
- (Italy) Nadia Centoni
- (Turkey) Nihan Güneyligil
- (Turkey) Nursevil Gökbudak
- (Turkey) Pelin Beydüz
- (Turkey) Su Zent
- (Turkey) Yağmur Mislina Kılıç
- Coach: (Turkey) Ataman Güneyligil
- Assistant Coach: (Turkey) Cihan Cintay

=== 2016–17 ===
Roster

- (Turkey) Ada Germen Korkmaz
- (Turkey) Aslı Kalaç
- (Belgium) Charlotte Leys
- (Turkey) Ezgi Arslan
- (Turkey) Gamze Alikaya
- (Turkey) Güldeniz Önal
- (Bulgaria) Hristina Ruseva
- (Turkey) Işıl Öz
- (Italy) Nadia Centoni
- (Turkey) Nihan Güneyligil
- (Turkey) Nursevil Gökbudak
- (Turkey) Pelin Beydüz
- (Turkey) Seda Aslanyürek
- (Trinidad and Tobago) Sinead Jack
- (Turkey) Su Zent
- Coach: (Turkey) Ataman Güneyligil
- Assistant Coach: (Turkey) Cihan Cintay

=== 2017–18 ===
Roster

- (Turkey) Aslı Kalaç
- (Turkey) Bihter Dumanoğlu
- (Turkey) Buse Kayacan
- (Turkey) Cansu Çetin
- (Bulgaria) Dobriana Rabadžieva
- (Turkey) Gamze Alikaya
- (Turkey) Gizem Güreşen
- (Bulgaria) Hristina Ruseva
- (Turkey) İlkin Aydın
- (Turkey) Neslihan Demir
- (Turkey) Nursevil Gökbudak
- (Turkey) Pelin Beydüz
- (Turkey) Seda Aslanyürek
- (Trinidad and Tobago) Sinead Jack
- (Turkey) Su Zent
- (Russia) Tatiana Kosheleva
- (Turkey) Yağmur Mislina Kılıç
- Coach: (Turkey) Ataman Güneyligil
- Assistant Coach: (Turkey) Cihan Cintay
- Team Manager: (Turkey) Nihan Güneyligil

=== 2018–19 ===
Roster

- (Turkey) Aslı Kalaç
- (Turkey) Buse Kayacan
- (Turkey) Çağla Akın
- (Turkey) Cansu Çetin
- (Belgium) Charlotte Leys
- (United States) Cursty Jackson
- (Turkey) Çağla Çiçekoğlu
- (Turkey) Dilara Gedikoğlu
- (Turkey) Elif Su Eriçek
- (Turkey) Gizem Güreşen
- (Turkey) Hande Baladın
- (Turkey) İlkin Aydın
- (Turkey) Melike Nezihe Çadır
- (Turkey) Meryem Boz
- (Turkey) Nur Sevil Gokbudak
- (Turkey) Pelin Beydüz
- (United States) Sherridan Atkinson
- (Turkey) Sinem Barut
- Coach: (Turkey) Ataman Güneyligil
- Assistant Coach: (Turkey) Cihan Cintay
- Team Manager: (Turkey) Nihan Güneyligil

=== 2019–20 ===
Roster

- (Greece) Anthí Vasilantonáki
- (Turkey) Aslı Kalaç
- (Turkey) Beren Yeşilırmak
- (Turkey) Çağla Akın
- (Turkey) Cansu Çetin
- (Turkey) Çağla Çiçekoğlu
- (Turkey) Derya Çayırgan
- (Turkey) Ece Emrullah
- (Turkey) Elif Su Eriçek
- (Turkey) Gizem Güreşen
- (Turkey) Güldeniz Önal
- (Turkey) İlkin Aydın
- (Turkey) Melike Nezihe Çadır
- (Turkey) Nilay Karaağaç
- (Ukraine) Olesia Rykhliuk
- (Turkey) Sezen Keşkekoğlu
- (Netherlands) Yvon Beliën
- Coach: (Turkey) Ataman Güneyligil
- Assistant Coach: (Turkey) Cihan Cintay
- Team Manager: (Turkey) Nihan Güneyligil

== 2020 Era ==
=== 2020–21 ===
Roster

- (Turkey) Beren Yeşilırmak
- (Turkey) Çağla Akın
- (Turkey) Derya Çayırgan
- (Turkey) Ece Emrullah
- (Turkey) Elif Su Eriçek
- (Turkey) Ergül Avcı Eroğlu
- (Turkey) Gizem Güreşen
- (Turkey) Güldeniz Önal
- (Turkey) Hazal Selin Uygur
- (Turkey) İlkin Aydın
- (Turkey) Nilay Karaağaç
- (Ukraine) Olesia Rykhliuk
- (Turkey) Sezen Keşkekoğlu
- (Turkey) Sude Hacımustafaoğlu
- (Russia) Tatiana Kosheleva
- Coach: (Turkey) Ataman Güneyligil
- Assistant Coach: (Turkey) Cihan Cintay
- Assistant Coach: (Russia) Fedor Kuzin
- Team Manager: (Turkey) Nihan Güneyligil

=== 2021–22 ===
Roster

- (Romania) (Turkey) Alexia Căruțașu
- (Greece) Anthí Vasilantonáki
- (Turkey) Beren Yeşilırmak
- (Turkey) Bihter Dumanoğlu
- (Turkey) Esra Demirkıran
- (Turkey) Fatma Beyaz
- (Turkey) Gamze Alikaya
- (Turkey) Gizem Güreşen
- (Turkey) İlkin Aydın
- (Turkey) Nilay Karaağaç
- (Slovenia) Saša Planinšec
- (Turkey) Su Zent
- (Turkey) Sude Hacımustafaoğlu
- (Turkey) Zeynep Sude Demirel
- Coach: (Turkey) Ataman Güneyligil
- Assistant Coach: (Turkey) Cihan Cintay
- Assistant Coach: (Turkey) Recep Vatansever

=== 2022–23 ===
Roster

- (Greece) Anthí Vasilantonáki
- (Turkey) Ayçin Akyol
- (Turkey) Beren Yeşilırmak
- (Turkey) Bihter Dumanoğlu
- (Turkey) Emine Arıcı
- (Turkey) Fatma Beyaz
- (Turkey) Fulden Ural
- (Turkey) Gamze Alikaya
- (Turkey) Gizem Güreşen
- (Turkey) İlkin Aydın
- (Turkey) İrem Nur Özsoy
- (Turkey) Karmen Aksoy
- (United States) Khat Bell
- (United States) Logan Eggleston
- (Serbia) Mina Popović
- (Turkey) Nazlı Eda Kafkas
- (Turkey) Özge Arslanalp
- (Turkey) Sude Hacımustafaoğlu
- Coach: (Turkey) Ataman Güneyligil
- Assistant Coach: (Turkey) Cihan Cintay
- Assistant Coach: (Turkey) Dehri Can Dehrioğlu

=== 2023–24 ===
Roster

- (Turkey) Arzum Tezcan
- (Turkey) Ayçin Akyol
- (Turkey) Bihter Dumanoğlu
- (United States) Danielle Cuttino
- (Turkey) Duygu Düzceler
- (Turkey) Elifsu Eriçek
- (Turkey) Emine Arıcı
- (Turkey) Fatma Beyaz
- (United States) Heather Gneiting
- (Turkey) İlkin Aydın
- (Japan) Kanami Tashiro
- (Serbia) Katarina Lazović
- (United States) Logan Eggleston
- (Turkey) Melisa Sazalan
- (Turkey) Özge Arslanalp
- (Russia) Polina Shemanova
- (Turkey) Selen Ursavaş
- (Turkey) Sude Hacımustafaoğlu
- (Turkey) Yağmur Karaoğlu
- Coach: (Spain) Guillermo Naranjo Hernández
- Assistant Coach: (Turkey) İsmail Çağrı Akdoğan
- Assistant Coach: (Turkey) Emre Türkileri
- Team Manager: (Turkey) Neşve Büyükbayram
