= 2022–23 Galatasaray S.K. (women's volleyball) season =

Galatasaray HDI Sigorta
2022–23 season
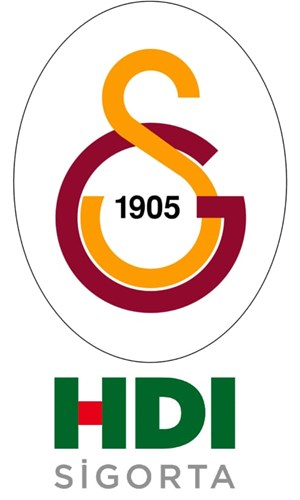
- President: Dursun Özbek
- Head coach: Ataman Güneyligil
- Arena: TVF Burhan Felek Sport Hall
- Misli.com Sultanlar Ligi: 5th seed
- Playoffs: 6th
- Axa Sigorta Kupa Voley: Quarter-finals
- Women's CEV Cup: 16th Finals

It is the 2022–23 season of the Women's Volleyball team of Galatasaray Sports Club.

== Overview ==
=== August ===
- On 3 August 2022, a new 2-year contract was signed with Head Coach Ataman Güneyligil.
- On 5 August 2022, Asuman Baş was appointed as the Manager of the Women's Volleyball Team.
- Dehri Can Dehrioğlu was appointed as the assistant coach of the Women's Volleyball Team on 9 August 2022.
- The fixtures of the Misli.com Sultanlar Ligi for the 2022–23 volleyball season were determined with the drawing of lots held at the Ankara Headquarters of the Turkish Volleyball Federation on August 12, 2022.

=== October ===
- In the notification made on 6 October 2022, it was announced that Galatasaray HDI Sigorta Women's Volleyball Team will participate in the Sardes Cup to be held in Manisa in order to support the treatment expenses of Duru Sağlık baby, who has SMA.
- In the notification made on 7 October 2022, it was announced that the Muhammet Görken Tournament, which will be hosted by Galatasaray HDI Sigorta Women's Volleyball Team, will start. The tournament, between 13 and 14 October, is organized in the name of Muhammet Görken, who struggled with MSA, who worked on volleyball.

=== March ===
- On 28 March 2023, Galatasaray Women's Volleyball Team head coach Ataman Güneyligil announced that he would not be in charge of the team in the new season.

=== May ===
- Ataman Güneyligil, who served as the head coach of Galatasaray Women's Volleyball Team for many years and will continue his career in Europe next season, was presented with a plaque by Galatasaray Sports Club President Dursun Özbek for his services to Galatasaray on 23 May 2023.

== Sponsorship and kit manufacturers ==
- Supplier: Umbro
- Name sponsor: HDI Sigorta
- Main sponsor: Daikin
- Jersey top sponsor: Tunç Holding
- Back sponsor: Garnet Trade
- Sleeve sponsor: —
- Lateral sponsor: GSMobile
- Short sponsor: HDI Sigorta
- Socks sponsor: —

== Technical Staff ==
As of 14 August 2022

Name	Job
(Turkey) Neslihan Turan	Volleyball Teams Administrative Manager
(Turkey) Asuman Baş	Team Manager
(Turkey) Ataman Güneyligil	Head Coach
(Turkey) Dehri Can Dehrioğlu	Assistant Coach
(Turkey) Gençer Yarkın	Assistant Coach and Conditioner
(Turkey) Emre Türkileri	Statistics Coach
(Turkey) Dinçer Kaya	Physiotherapist
(Turkey) Murat Beder	Masseur
(Turkey) Serpil Amaç	Volleyball Branch Secretary

== Team roster ==
As of 22 March 2023

Shirt No	Nationality	Player	Birth Date	Position	Height
1	Greece	Anthí Vasilantonáki	9 April 1996 (age 30)	Outside Hitter	1.96
2	Turkey	İlkin Aydın	5 January 2000 (age 26)	Outside Hitter	1.83
4	Turkey	Karmen Aksoy	8 July 2003 (age 22)	Middle-blocker	1.92
5	Serbia	Mina Popović	16 September 1994 (age 31)	Middle-blocker	1.87
6	Turkey	Sude Hacımustafaoğlu	25 March 2002 (age 24)	Outside Hitter	1.80
7	Turkey	Emine Arıcı	17 January 1997 (age 29)	Middle-blocker	1.92
8	Turkey	Nazlı Eda Kafkas	16 November 2001 (age 24)	Setter	1.80
10	Turkey	Ayçin Akyol	15 June 1999 (age 27)	Middle-blocker	1.88
11	Turkey	Gamze Alikaya (c)	1 February 1993 (age 33)	Setter	1.79
12	Turkey	Bihter Dumanoğlu	3 February 1995 (age 31)	Libero	1.75
18	Turkey	Beren Yeşilırmak	1 June 2005 (age 21)	Opposite	1.77
20	Turkey	İrem Nur Özsoy	13 June 2003 (age 23)	Libero	1.70
33	United States	Logan Eggleston	13 November 2000 (age 25)	Outside Hitter	1.85
90	Turkey	Fulden Ural	3 January 1991 (age 35)	Outside Hitter	1.86

== Transfers ==
=== New contracts ===
Date	Player	Contract length	Source
8 August 2022	(Turkey) İlkin Aydın	3-year	
9 August 2022	(Greece) Anthí Vasilantonáki	1-year + 1-year	
10 August 2022	(Turkey) Sude Hacımustafaoğlu	1-year	
22 August 2022	(Turkey) Beren Yeşilırmak	2-year	

=== In ===
Date	Player	From	Source
12 August 2022	(Turkey) Fulden Ural	(Turkey) Kuzeyboru	
15 August 2022	(Turkey) Nazlı Eda Kafkas	(Turkey) Yeşilyurt	
16 August 2022	(Turkey) Karmen Aksoy	(Turkey) VakıfBank	
17 August 2022	(Turkey) Ayçin Akyol	(Turkey) Sigorta Shop Kalecik Belediyespor	
17 August 2022	(Serbia) Mina Popović	(Turkey) Fenerbahçe Opet	
22 September 2022	(United States) Khat Bell	(South Korea) Incheon Heungkuk Life Pink Spiders	
31 December 2022	(United States) Logan Eggleston	(United States) Texas Longhorns women's volleyball	
19 January 2023	(Turkey) Emine Arıcı	(Turkey) Aydın Büyükşehir Belediyespor	

=== Out ===
Date	Player	From	Source
19 April 2022	(Turkey) Nilay Karaağaç	Retired	
25 April 2022	(Slovenia) Saša Planinšec	(Turkey) Aydın Büyükşehir Belediyespor	
26 April 2022	(Turkey) Zeynep Sude Demirel	(Turkey) Türk Hava Yolları Spor Kulübü	
27 April 2022	(Turkey) Su Zent	(Turkey) Sarıyer Belediyesi Spor Kulübü	
16 June 2022	(Romania) Alexia Căruțașu	(Turkey) VakıfBank Spor Kulübü	
29 December 2022	(United States) Khat Bell	(South Korea) Korea Expressway Corporation Hi-Pass	
19 January 2023	(Turkey) Fatma Beyaz	(Turkey) Adam Voleybol	
21 March 2023	(Turkey) Gizem Güreşen	Free agent	

== Pre-season and friendlies ==
Date	Time		Score		Set 1	Set 2	Set 3	Set 4	Set 5	Total	Report
27 September 2022	–	Galatasaray HDI Sigorta	1–3	Türk Hava Yolları Spor Kulübü	17–25	12–25	25–20	20–25	–	74–95	Report
29 September 2022	–	Galatasaray HDI Sigorta	2–2	Aydın Büyükşehir Belediyespor	17–25	25–22	27–25	15–25	–	84–97	Report
7 October 2022	17:00	SigortaShop Kadın Voleybol Kulübü	0–3	Galatasaray HDI Sigorta	18–25	23–25	16–25	–	–	57–75	Report 1 Report 2
8 October 2022	18:00	Galatasaray HDI Sigorta	3–0	Çukurova Belediye Adana Demirspor	25–18	25–20	25–18	–	–	75–56	Report 1 Report 2
9 October 2022	15:00	Aydın Büyükşehir Belediyespor	2–3	Galatasaray HDI Sigorta	16–25	25–23	25–23	17–25	12–15	95–111	Report 1 Report 2
13 October 2022	19:00	Galatasaray HDI Sigorta	3–1	Bolu Belediyespor	25–23	25–17	20–25	25–21	–	95–86	Report 1 Report 2
14 October 2022	19:00	Galatasaray HDI Sigorta	3–1	VakıfBank Spor Kulübü	25–18	26–28	25–19	25–16	–	101–81	Report 1 Report 2
18 October 2022	–	Galatasaray HDI Sigorta	1–4	Eczacıbaşı Dynavit	25–27	24–26	23–25	25–17	16–25	113–120	Report
28 February 2023	17:30	Eczacıbaşı Dynavit	3–0	Galatasaray HDI Sigorta	25–19	25–22	25–14	–	–	75–55	Report

== Competitions ==
=== Turkish Women's Volleyball League (Misli.com Sultanlar Ligi) ===
==== League table ====
Qualified for the Play-off (1st-4th)
Qualified for the Play-off (5th-8th)
Qualified for the Turkish Women's Volleyball First League

Pos	Team	Pld	W	L	Pts	SW	SL	SR	SPW	SPL	SPR	Qualification
1	Eczacıbaşı Dynavit	26	26	0	76	78	7	11.143	2102	1662	1.265	Play-off (1st-4th)
2	VakıfBank Spor Kulübü	26	23	3	68	69	16	4.313	2064	1698	1.216	Play-off (1st-4th)
3	Fenerbahçe Opet	26	22	4	66	69	19	3.632	2108	1663	1.268	Play-off (1st-4th)
4	Türk Hava Yolları Spor Kulübü	26	18	8	55	63	33	1.909	2179	1952	1.116	Play-off (1st-4th)
5	Galatasaray HDI Sigorta	26	17	9	50	57	42	1.357	2221	2094	1.061	Play-off (5th-8th)
6	Nilüfer Belediyespor	26	15	11	43	51	48	1.063	2159	2144	1.007	Play-off (5th-8th)
7	Sarıyer Belediyesi Spor Kulübü	26	14	12	37	48	51	0.941	2127	2167	0.982	Play-off (5th-8th)
8	Aydın Büyükşehir Belediyespor	26	10	16	34	46	60	0.767	2291	2341	0.979	Play-off (5th-8th)
9	Çukurova Belediye Adana Demirspor	26	10	16	30	39	55	0.709	2022	2098	0.964	
10	Kuzeyboru	26	9	17	27	36	58	0.621	2020	2185	0.924	
11	PTT Spor Kulübü	26	9	17	26	38	61	0.623	2014	2202	0.915	
12	SigortaShop Kadın Voleybol Kulübü	26	5	21	21	40	70	0.571	2270	2431	0.934	
13	Bolu Belediyespor	26	4	22	13	28	70	0.400	1963	2272	0.864	Turkish Women's Volleyball First League
14	İlbank	26	0	26	0	6	78	0.077	1453	2084	0.697	Turkish Women's Volleyball First League

Source: Misli.com Sultans League Stage
Rules for classification: 1) Games won 2) Points 3) Set ratio 4) Setpoint ratio

==== Regular season (1st Half) ====
- All times are Europe Time (UTC+03:00).

Date	Time		Score		Set 1	Set 2	Set 3	Set 4	Set 5	Total	Report
2 November 2022	17:00	Kuzeyboru	0–3	Galatasaray HDI Sigorta	20–25	23–25	22–25	–	–	65–75	Report 1 Report 2
6 November 2022	15:00	Galatasaray HDI Sigorta	3–0	Çukurova Belediye Adana Demirspor	25–14	25–21	25–21	–	–	75–56	Report 1 Report 2
9 November 2022	18:00	Bolu Belediyespor	1–3	Galatasaray HDI Sigorta	19–25	15–25	25–21	18–25	–	77–96	Report 1 Report 2
13 November 2022	15:00	Galatasaray HDI Sigorta	3–1	SigortaShop Kadın Voleybol Kulübü	25–18	23–25	25–20	25–9	–	98–72	Report 1 Report 2
16 November 2022	13:00	İlbank	0–3	Galatasaray HDI Sigorta	15–25	15–25	15–25	–	–	45–75	Report 1 Report 2
20 November 2022	15:00	Galatasaray HDI Sigorta	0–3	Fenerbahçe Opet	16–25	19–25	20–25	–	–	55–75	Report 1 Report 2
23 November 2022	17:00	Eczacıbaşı Dynavit	3–0	Galatasaray HDI Sigorta	31–29	25–15	25–22	–	–	81–66	Report 1 Report 2
28 November 2022	13:00	Galatasaray HDI Sigorta	1–3	Nilüfer Belediyespor	14–25	25–18	22–25	24–26	–	85–94	Report 1 Report 2
3 December 2022	17:00	Sarıyer Belediyesi Spor Kulübü	1–3	Galatasaray HDI Sigorta	23–25	23–25	25–17	23–25	–	94–92	Report 1 Report 2
10 December 2022	14:00	Galatasaray HDI Sigorta	2–3	VakıfBank Spor Kulübü	25–16	20–25	17–25	25–19	13–15	100–100	Report 1 Report 2
18 December 2022	15:00	PTT Spor Kulübü	2–3	Galatasaray HDI Sigorta	25–23	25–21	18–25	20–25	13–15	101–109	Report 1 Report 2
25 December 2022	15:00	Galatasaray HDI Sigorta	2–3	Türk Hava Yolları Spor Kulübü	21–25	25–20	19–25	25–23	7–15	97–108	Report 1 Report 2
28 December 2022	13:00	Galatasaray HDI Sigorta	3–1	Aydın Büyükşehir Belediyespor	19–25	25–15	25–18	25–21	–	94–79	Report 1 Report 2

==== Regular season (2nd Half) ====
- All times are Europe Time (UTC+03:00).

Date	Time		Score		Set 1	Set 2	Set 3	Set 4	Set 5	Total	Report
14 January 2023	13:00	Galatasaray HDI Sigorta	3–1	Kuzeyboru	25–14	25–22	21–25	25–23	–	96–84	Report 1 Report 2
21 January 2023	14:00	Çukurova Belediye Adana Demirspor	1–3	Galatasaray HDI Sigorta	18–25	25–22	19–25	23–25	–	85–97	Report 1 Report 2
28 January 2023	15:00	Galatasaray HDI Sigorta	3–1	Bolu Belediyespor	22–25	25–18	25–15	25–21	–	97–79	Report 1 Report 2
4 February 2023	14:00	SigortaShop Kadın Voleybol Kulübü	2–3	Galatasaray HDI Sigorta	16–25	16–25	25–23	25–18	13–15	95–106	Report 1 Report 2
4 March 2023	14:00	Galatasaray HDI Sigorta	3–1	İlbank	25–17	22–25	25–17	25–14	–	97–73	Report 1 Report 2
11 March 2023	14:00	Fenerbahçe Opet	3–0	Galatasaray HDI Sigorta	25–15	25–13	25–17	–	–	75–45	Report 1 Report 2
19 March 2023	19:00	Galatasaray HDI Sigorta	0–3	Eczacıbaşı Dynavit	19–25	23–25	22–25	–	–	64–75	Report 1 Report 2
25 March 2023	15:00	Nilüfer Belediyespor	0–3	Galatasaray HDI Sigorta	22–25	23–25	18–25	–	–	63–75	Report 1 Report 2
1 April 2023	15:00	Galatasaray HDI Sigorta	3–1	Sarıyer Belediyesi Spor Kulübü	25–19	25–22	21–25	25–21	–	96–87	Report 1 Report 2
8 April 2023	17:00	VakıfBank Spor Kulübü	3–0	Galatasaray HDI Sigorta	25–21	25–23	25–23	–	–	75–67	Report 1 Report 2
15 April 2023	15:00	Galatasaray HDI Sigorta	3–0	PTT Spor Kulübü	26–24	25–19	25–23	–	–	76–66	Report 1 Report 2
18 April 2023	18:00	Türk Hava Yolları Spor Kulübü	3–1	Galatasaray HDI Sigorta	25–21	25–23	13–25	25–20	–	88–89	Report 1 Report 2
23 April 2023	14:00	Aydın Büyükşehir Belediyespor	2–3	Galatasaray HDI Sigorta	25–16	18–25	25–18	22–25	12–15	102–99	Report 1 Report 2

==== Playoffs ====
===== 5–8th place =====
- All times are Europe Time (UTC+03:00).

Date	Time		Score		Set 1	Set 2	Set 3	Set 4	Set 5	Total	Report
3 May 2023	18:00	Aydın Büyükşehir Belediyespor	2–3	Galatasaray HDI Sigorta	18–25	23–25	25–21	25–17	12–15	103–103	Report 1 Report 2
6 May 2023	13:00	Galatasaray HDI Sigorta	3–1	Aydın Büyükşehir Belediyespor	25–27	25–9	25–23	25–17	–	100–76	Report 1 Report 2

===== 5–6th place =====
- All times are Europe Time (UTC+03:00).

Date	Time		Score		Set 1	Set 2	Set 3	Set 4	Set 5	Total	Report
9 May 2023	18:00	Nilüfer Belediyespor	3–1	Galatasaray HDI Sigorta	25–20	25–13	23–25	25–19	–	98–77	Report 1 Report 2
12 May 2023	19:00	Galatasaray HDI Sigorta	1–3	Nilüfer Belediyespor	22–25	17–25	25–21	23–25	–	87–96	Report 1 Report 2

=== Turkish Women's Volleyball Cup (Axa Sigorta Kupa Voley) ===
==== Group C ====
Pos	Team	Pld	W	L	Pts	SW	SL	SR	SPW	SPL	SPR
1	Galatasaray HDI Sigorta	3	2	1	7	8	4	2.000	279	229	1.218
2	Sarıyer Belediyesi Spor Kulübü	3	2	1	6	6	4	1.500	239	227	1.053
3	Nilüfer Belediyespor	3	2	1	5	7	6	1.167	270	290	0.931
4	PTT Spor Kulübü	3	0	3	0	2	9	0.222	228	270	0.844

===== Results =====
- All times are Europe Time (UTC+03:00).

Date	Time		Score		Set 1	Set 2	Set 3	Set 4	Set 5	Total	Report
21 October 2022	14:00	Galatasaray HDI Sigorta	2–3	Nilüfer Belediyespor	25–11	23–25	20–25	25–18	11–15	104–94	Report 1 Report 2
22 October 2022	15:30	Sarıyer Belediyesi Spor Kulübü	0–3	Galatasaray HDI Sigorta	22–25	27–29	11–25	–	–	60–79	Report 1 Report 2
23 October 2022	13:00	Galatasaray HDI Sigorta	3–1	PTT Spor Kulübü	25–16	25–18	21–25	25–16	–	96–75	Report 1 Report 2

==== Quarter-finals ====
- All times are Europe Time (UTC+03:00).

Date	Time		Score		Set 1	Set 2	Set 3	Set 4	Set 5	Total	Report
8 March 2023	17:00	VakıfBank Spor Kulübü	3–0	Galatasaray HDI Sigorta	25–14	25–19	25–18	–	–	75–51	Report 1 Report 2

=== Women's CEV Cup ===
==== 16th Finals ====
Date	Time		Score		Set 1	Set 2	Set 3	Set 4	Set 5	Total	Report
14 December 2022	20:30	Galatasaray HDI Sigorta (Turkey)	1–3	(Italy) Savino Del Bene Scandicci	17–25	15–25	25–19	12–25	–	69–94	Report 1 Report 2
22 December 2022	20:00	Savino Del Bene Scandicci (Italy)	3–0	(Turkey) Galatasaray HDI Sigorta	25–14	25–19	25–21	–	–	75–54	Report 1 Report 2
