= 2021–22 Galatasaray S.K. (women's volleyball) season =

Galatasaray HDI Sigorta
2021–22 season
- President: Burak Elmas
- Head coach: Ataman Güneyligil
- Arena: TVF Burhan Felek Sport Hall
- Misli.com Sultanlar Ligi: 5th
- Playoffs: 5th
- Axa Sigorta Kupa Voley: Quarter-finals

It is the 2021–22 season of the Women's Volleyball team of Galatasaray Sports Club.

== Sponsorship and kit manufacturers ==
- Supplier: Galatasaray Store
- Name sponsor: HDI Sigorta
- Main sponsor: HDI Sigorta and Tunç Holding
- Back sponsor: Qnet
- Sleeve sponsor: —
- Lateral sponsor: GSMobile
- Short sponsor: —
- Socks sponsor: —

== Technical Staff ==
As of 9 December 2021

Name	Job
(Turkey) Neslihan Turan	Volleyball Branch Administrative Manager
(Turkey) Serpil Amaç	Volleyball Branch Secretary
(Turkey) Ataman Güneyligil	Women's Volleyball Team Head Coach
(Turkey) Cihan Çintay	Women's Volleyball Team Coach
(Turkey) Gencer Yarkın	Women's Volleyball Team Coach
(Turkey) Turgay Aslanyürek	Women's Volleyball Team Conditioner
(Turkey) Dinçer Kaya	Women's Volleyball Team Physiotherapist
(Turkey) Recep Vatansever	Women's Volleyball Team Statistics Coach
(Turkey) Onur Mahir Daşdemir	Women's Volleyball Team Field Coach
(Turkey) Murat Beder	Masseur

== Team roster ==
As of 9 December 2021

Shirt No	Nationality	Player	Birth Date	Position	Height
1	Greece	Anthí Vasilantonáki	9 April 1996 (age 30)	Outside Hitter	1.96
2	Turkey	İlkin Aydın	5 January 2000 (age 26)	Wing-Spiker	1.83
3	Turkey	Gizem Güreşen (c)	14 January 1987 (age 39)	Libero	1.78
4	Turkey	Beren Yeşilırmak	1 June 2005 (age 21)	Wing-Spiker	1.77
7	Turkey	Fatma Beyaz	16 April 1995 (age 31)	Middle-blocker	1.86
9	Slovenia	Saša Planinšec	2 June 1995 (age 31)	Middle-blocker	1.85
10	Turkey	Sude Hacımustafaoğlu	25 March 2002 (age 24)	Outside Hitter	1.80
11	Turkey	Nilay Karaağaç	24 October 1985 (age 40)	Setter	1.79
12	Turkey	Bihter Dumanoğlu	3 February 1995 (age 31)	Libero	1.75
13	Turkey	Zeynep Sude Demirel	27 November 2000 (age 25)	Middle-blocker	1.98
14	Romania	Alexia Căruțașu	10 June 2003 (age 23)	Wing-Spiker	1.88
17	Turkey	Su Zent	23 March 1996 (age 30)	Middle-blocker	1.85
18	Turkey	Gamze Alikaya	1 February 1993 (age 33)	Setter	1.79

== Transfers ==
=== New contracts ===
Date	Player	Source
19 April 2021	(Turkey) Gizem Güreşen	

=== In ===
Date	Player	From	Source
19 April 2021	(Turkey) Gamze Alikaya	(Turkey) Eczacıbaşı VitrA	
21 April 2021	(Turkey) Bihter Dumanoğlu	(Turkey) Sistem9 Yeşilyurt	
22 April 2021	(Turkey) Zeynep Sude Demirel	(Turkey) Sistem9 Yeşilyurt	
14 May 2021	(Greece) Anthí Vasilantonáki	(Turkey) Aydın Büyükşehir Belediyespor	
14 May 2021	(Turkey) Fatma Beyaz	(Turkey) Bolu Belediyespor	
14 May 2021	(Turkey) Su Zent	(Turkey) PTT Spor Kulübü	
14 May 2021	(Romania) Alexia Căruțașu	(Turkey) Sistem9 Yeşilyurt	
21 May 2021	(Slovenia) Saša Planinšec	(Turkey) Aydın Büyükşehir Belediyespor	

=== Out ===
Date	Player	From	Source
5 April 2021	(Turkey) Çağla Akın	(Turkey) Nilüfer Belediyespor	
10 April 2021	(Turkey) Hazal Selin Arifoğlu	(Turkey) Kuzeyboru	
27 April 2021	(Turkey) Ergül Avcı Eroğlu	(Turkey) Aydın Büyükşehir Belediyespor	
4 May 2021	(Ukraine) Olesia Rykhliuk	(Turkey) Kuzeyboru	
5 May 2021	(Turkey) Ece Emrullah	(United States) Texas A&M University–Corpus Christi	
18 May 2021	(Turkey) Güldeniz Önal	(Turkey) Aydın Büyükşehir Belediyespor	
28 May 2021	(Turkey) Derya Çayırgan	(Turkey) Çukurova Belediyespor	
7 June 2021	(Russia) Tatiana Kosheleva	(Italy) Megabox Vallefoglia	

== Pre-season and friendlies ==
- All times are Europe Time (UTC+03:00).

Date	Time		Score		Set 1	Set 2	Set 3	Set 4	Set 5	Total	Report
16 September 2021	–	Galatasaray HDI Sigorta	4–0	Olympiacos	25–20	25–17	25–17	25–21	–	100–75	Report
22 September 2021	18:30	Kuzeyboru	3–1	Galatasaray HDI Sigorta	25–16	25–23	21–25	25–16	–	96–80	Report
23 September 2021	16:00	PTT Spor Kulübü	3–2	Galatasaray HDI Sigorta	25–12	25–22	22–25	23–25	15–11	110–95	Report
24 September 2021	12:00	Mert Grup Sigorta	0–3	Galatasaray HDI Sigorta	20–25	14–25	16–25	–	–	50–75	Report
24 September 2021	12:00	Mert Grup Sigorta	0–3	Galatasaray HDI Sigorta	20–25	14–25	16–25	–	–	50–75	Report
30 December 2021	–	Galatasaray HDI Sigorta	3–2	Eczacıbaşı Dynavit	25–13	16–25	22–25	25–20	15–10	103–93	Report

== Competitions ==
=== Turkish Women's Volleyball League (Misli.com Sultanlar Ligi) ===
==== League table ====
Qualified for the Play-offs (1–4)
Qualified for the Play-offs (5–8)
Qualified for the Play-outs

Pos	Team	Pld	W	L	Pts	SW	SL	SR	SPW	SPL	SPR	Qualification
1	VakıfBank Spor Kulübü	26	24	2	71	73	14	5.214	2138	1665	1.284	Play-offs (1-4)
2	Eczacıbaşı Dynavit	26	22	4	66	70	20	3.500	2132	1779	1.198	Play-offs (1-4)
3	Fenerbahçe Opet	26	22	4	66	71	22	3.227	2214	1776	1.247	Play-offs (1-4)
4	Türk Hava Yolları Spor Kulübü	26	21	5	60	67	26	2.577	2173	1837	1.183	Play-offs (1-4)
5	Galatasaray HDI Sigorta	26	17	9	51	58	37	1.568	2127	1951	1.090	Play-offs (5-8)
6	PTT Spor Kulübü	26	17	9	47	55	42	1.310	2178	2109	1.033	Play-offs (5-8)
7	Aydın Büyükşehir Belediyespor	26	12	14	37	43	47	0.915	1974	1982	0.996	Play-offs (5-8)
8	Kuzeyboru	26	11	15	38	48	51	0.941	2105	2095	1.005	Play-offs (5-8)
9	Mert Grup Sigorta	26	10	16	29	41	56	0.732	2068	2159	0.958	
10	Bolu Belediyespor	26	7	19	22	32	64	0.500	1935	2219	0.872	
11	Sarıyer Belediyesi Spor Kulübü	26	7	19	21	37	67	0.552	2082	2320	0.897	
12	Nilüfer Belediyespor	26	6	20	17	25	68	0.368	1845	2200	0.839	
13	Karayolları Spor Kulübü	26	5	21	16	29	71	0.408	2010	2295	0.876	Play-outs
14	Yeşilyurt Spor Kulübü	26	1	25	5	12	76	0.158	1527	2121	0.720	Play-outs

Source: Misli.com Sultanlar Lig Etabı / Update: 5 April 2022

==== Regular season (1st Half) ====
- All times are Europe Time (UTC+03:00).

Date	Time		Score		Set 1	Set 2	Set 3	Set 4	Set 5	Total	Report
9 October 2021	14:00	Galatasaray HDI Sigorta	1–3	PTT Spor Kulübü	19–25	21–25	25–21	19–25	–	84–96	Report
12 October 2021	15:00	Aydın Büyükşehir Belediyespor	1–3	Galatasaray HDI Sigorta	27–25	14–25	20–25	21–25	–	82–100	Report
16 October 2021	15:00	Galatasaray HDI Sigorta	3–0	Kuzeyboru	25–11	25–17	25–22	–	–	75–50	Report
19 October 2021	16:30	Yeşilyurt Spor Kulübü	1–3	Galatasaray HDI Sigorta	25–21	14–25	18–25	21–25	–	78–96	Report
23 October 2021	20:00	Galatasaray HDI Sigorta	3–2	Eczacıbaşı Dynavit	25–20	16–25	25–20	22–25	15–9	103–99	Report
30 October 2021	18:00	Fenerbahçe Opet	3–2	Galatasaray HDI Sigorta	25–18	20–25	20–25	25–21	15–11	105–100	Report
6 November 2021	14:30	Galatasaray HDI Sigorta	3–0	Karayolları Spor Kulübü	25–19	25–20	25–20	–	–	75–59	Report
9 November 2021	17:00	Bolu Belediyespor	1–3	Galatasaray HDI Sigorta	26–24	15–25	18–25	18–25	–	77–99	Report
13 November 2021	16:30	Galatasaray HDI Sigorta	3–0	Nilüfer Belediyespor	25–23	25–16	25–17	–	–	75–56	Report
20 November 2021	13:00	VakıfBank Spor Kulübü	3–0	Galatasaray HDI Sigorta	25–16	25–19	25–12	–	–	75–47	Report
28 November 2021	14:00	Galatasaray HDI Sigorta	3–2	Sarıyer Belediyesi Spor Kulübü	25–23	25–22	27–25	–	–	77–70	Report
4 December 2021	17:00	Türk Hava Yolları Spor Kulübü	3–2	Galatasaray HDI Sigorta	25–16	16–25	19–25	25–18	15–6	100–90	Report
10 December 2021	13:00	Mert Grup Sigorta	2–3	Galatasaray HDI Sigorta	16–25	25–23	25–22	22–25	13–15	101–110	Report

==== Regular season (2nd Half) ====
- All times are Europe Time (UTC+03:00).

Date	Time		Score		Set 1	Set 2	Set 3	Set 4	Set 5	Total	Report
23 February 2022	13:00	PTT Spor Kulübü	3–2	Galatasaray HDI Sigorta	21–25	25–23	25–23	20–25	15–12	106–108	Report
15 January 2022	14:00	Galatasaray HDI Sigorta	3–0	Aydın Büyükşehir Belediyespor	25–22	25–20	25–13	–	–	75–55	Report
23 January 2022	17:00	Kuzeyboru	2–3	Galatasaray HDI Sigorta	19–25	25–19	17–25	25–17	5–15	91–101	Report
30 January 2022	14:30	Galatasaray HDI Sigorta	3–0	Yeşilyurt Spor Kulübü	25–17	25–12	25–21	–	–	75–50	Report
7 February 2022	17:00	Eczacıbaşı Dynavit	3–0	Galatasaray HDI Sigorta	25–22	25–22	25–16	–	–	75–60	Report
2 March 2022	17:00	Galatasaray HDI Sigorta	0–3	Fenerbahçe Opet	18–25	20–25	22–25	–	–	60–75	Report
20 February 2022	15:00	Karayolları Spor Kulübü	0–3	Galatasaray HDI Sigorta	20–25	18–25	20–25	–	–	58–75	Report
27 February 2022	16:00	Galatasaray HDI Sigorta	3–0	Bolu Belediyespor	25–20	25–19	29–27	–	–	79–66	Report
6 March 2022	15:00	Nilüfer Belediyespor	0–3	Galatasaray HDI Sigorta	18–25	23–25	14–25	–	–	55–75	Report
13 March 2022	17:00	Galatasaray HDI Sigorta	0–3	VakıfBank Spor Kulübü	17–25	23–25	16–25	–	–	56–75	Report
21 March 2022	13:00	Sarıyer Belediyesi Spor Kulübü	1–3	Galatasaray HDI Sigorta	26–24	12–25	17–25	11–25	–	66–99	Report
27 March 2022	13:30	Galatasaray HDI Sigorta	0–3	Türk Hava Yolları Spor Kulübü	25–27	18–25	15–25	–	–	58–77	Report
2 April 2022	17:00	Galatasaray HDI Sigorta	3–0	Mert Grup Sigorta	25–20	25–12	25–22	–	–	75–54	Report

==== Playoffs ====
===== 5–8th place =====
- All times are Europe Time (UTC+03:00).

Date	Time		Score		Set 1	Set 2	Set 3	Set 4	Set 5	Total	Report
8 April 2022	15:00	Kuzeyboru	2–3	Galatasaray HDI Sigorta	25–14	25–14	17–25	14–25	13–15	94–93	Report
11 April 2022	15:00	Galatasaray HDI Sigorta	3–1	Kuzeyboru	25–17	31–33	25–15	25–19	–	106–84	Report

===== 5–6th place =====
- All times are Europe Time (UTC+03:00).

Date	Time		Score		Set 1	Set 2	Set 3	Set 4	Set 5	Total	Report
16 April 2022	14:00	PTT Spor Kulübü	1–3	Galatasaray HDI Sigorta	25–23	23–25	24–26	18–25	–	90–99	Report
19 April 2022	15:00	Galatasaray HDI Sigorta	3–0	PTT Spor Kulübü	25–19	25–11	25–22	–	–	75–52	Report

=== Turkish Women's Volleyball Cup (Axa Sigorta Kupa Voley) ===
==== Group B ====
Pos	Team	Pld	W	L	Pts	SW	SL	SR	SPW	SPL	SPR
1	Galatasaray HDI Sigorta	3	3	0	9	9	1	9.000	244	213	1.146
2	Eczacıbaşı Dynavit	3	2	1	6	6	3	2.000	211	187	1.128
3	Mert Grup Sigorta	3	1	2	3	3	7	0.429	195	231	0.844
4	Karayolları Spor Kulübü	3	0	3	0	2	9	0.222	239	258	0.926

===== Results =====
- All times are Europe Time (UTC+03:00).

Date	Time		Score		Set 1	Set 2	Set 3	Set 4	Set 5	Total	Report
28 September 2021	18:30	Galatasaray HDI Sigorta	3–1	Karayolları Spor Kulübü	16–25	25–23	25–23	28–26	–	94–97	Report
29 September 2021	18:30	Mert Grup Sigorta	0–3	Galatasaray HDI Sigorta	20–25	12–25	23–25	–	–	55–75	Report
30 September 2021	15:00	Eczacıbaşı Dynavit	0–3	Galatasaray HDI Sigorta	21–25	21–25	19–25	–	–	61–75	Report

==== Quarter-finals ====
- All times are Europe Time (UTC+03:00).

Date	Time		Score		Set 1	Set 2	Set 3	Set 4	Set 5	Total	Report
12 January 2022	18:00	VakıfBank Spor Kulübü	3–0	Galatasaray HDI Sigorta	25–22	25–13	25–20	–	–	75–55	Report
