= 2011–12 Galatasaray S.K. (women's volleyball) season =

Galatasaray
2011–12 season
- Chairman: (Turkey) Ünal Aysal
- Manager: (Turkey) Dragan Nešić

Galatasaray SK. Women's Volleyball 2011–2012 season is the 2011–2012 volleyball season for Turkish professional volleyball club Galatasaray.

The club competes in:

- Turkish Women's Volleyball League
- Turkish Cup

== Team Roster Season 2011–12 ==
As of 25 September 2011

Shirt No	Nationality	Player	Birth Date	Height	Position
1	Serbia	Slađana Erić	July 29, 1983 (age 42)	183	Middle Blocker
2	Turkey	Ezgi Arslan	March 23, 1992 (age 33)	190	Outside Hitter
3	Croatia	Marina Miletić	February 21, 1983 (age 43)	180	Outside Hitter
4	Turkey	Seray Altay	August 28, 1987 (age 38)	182	Opposite Hitter
5	Turkey	Funda Bilgi	June 4, 1983 (age 42)	163	Libero
6	Turkey	Buse İnce	March 25, 1993 (age 32)	181	Middle Blocker
7	Turkey	Natalia Hanikoğlu	June 23, 1975 (age 50)	189	Outside Hitter
8	Turkey	Nilay Konar	August 30, 1980 (age 45)	190	Middle Blocker
9	Turkey	Deniz Hakyemez	February 3, 1983 (age 43)	188	Outside Hitter
10	Turkey	Aslı Türker	November 19, 1988 (age 37)	182	Middle Blocker
11	Turkey	Gamze Alikaya	June 27, 1993 (age 32)	179	Setter
12	Cuba	Rosir Calderón	December 28, 1984 (age 41)	190	Outside Hitter
13	Turkey	Selime İlyasoğlu	August 2, 1988 (age 37)	183	Outside Hitter
14	Italy	Eleonora Lo Bianco	December 22, 1979 (age 46)	172	Setter
15	Turkey	Bihter Dumanoğlu	August 28, 1992 (age 33)	182	Libero
16	Turkey	Ecem Alıcı	January 1, 1994 (age 32)	181	Outside Hitter
18	Turkey	Gökçen Denkel	August 2, 1985 (age 40)	188	Middle Blocker

== Squad changes for the 2011–2012 season ==
In: Note: Flags indicate national team as defined under FIFA eligibility rules; some limited exceptions apply. Players may hold more than one non-FIFA nationality.

No.	Pos.	Nation	Player
1		SRB	Slađana Erić (from Universal Modena)
2		TUR	Seray Altay (from Eczacıbaşı Zentiva)
7		TUR	Buse İnce (from Bartın Polisgücü)
10	PG	TUR	Natalia Hanikoğlu (from Azzerail Bakü)
13		TUR	Nilay Konar (from TED Kolejliler)
14		TUR	Aslı Türker (from Emlak TOKİ)
16		CUB	Rosir Calderón (from Voléro Zürich)
18		TUR	Selime İlyasoğlu (from Nilüfer Belediyesi)
18		ITA	Eleonora Lo Bianco (from Foppapedretti Volley Bergamo)
18		TUR	Bihter Dumanoğlu (from GS Youth Team)
18		TUR	Ecem Alıcı (from TVF Spor Lisesi)

Out: Note: Flags indicate national team as defined under FIFA eligibility rules; some limited exceptions apply. Players may hold more than one non-FIFA nationality.

No.	Pos.	Nation	Player
1		SRB	Vesna Čitaković (to Muszynianka Muszyna)
9		PUR	Karina Ocasio (to Juncos)
2		SRB	Ivana Đerisilo (to Chateau d'Ax Urbino)
8		TUR	Merve Dalbeler (to Fenerbahçe)
4		TUR	Özlem Özçelik (to Beşiktaş)
10		TUR	Seda Uslu Eryüz (to Fenerbahçe)
16		TUR	Gözde Dal (to TED Kolejliler)
5		BRA	Erika Coimbra (to Igtisadchi Baku)
16		TUR	Ebru Elhan (to Ereğli Belediyesi)
16		TUR	Arzu Göllü (to retired)

== Results, schedules and standings ==
=== Pre-season games ===
Galatasaray MP won the Izida Cup.

==== Izida Cup ====
September 6, 2011; 17:00	Spartak OMSK	3 – 2	Galatasaray MP	Dobrotisa Sports Hall

September 7, 2011; 17:00	Ukraine National Team	3 – 2	Galatasaray MP	Dobrotisa Sports Hall
September 7, 2011; 17:00	19–25, 25–21, 21–25, 25–23, 15–12			Dobrotisa Sports Hall

September 8, 2011; 17:00	Yeşilyurt	2 – 3	Galatasaray MP	Dobrotisa Sports Hall
September 8, 2011; 17:00	(Report)			Dobrotisa Sports Hall

September 10, 2011; 17:00	Loko Angara	0 – 3	Galatasaray MP	Dobrotisa Sports Hall
September 10, 2011; 17:00	(Report)			Dobrotisa Sports Hall

September 11, 2011; 17:00	OK Crvena zvezda	0 – 3	Galatasaray MP	Dobrotisa Sports Hall
September 11, 2011; 17:00	23–25, 19–25, 21–25 (Report)			Dobrotisa Sports Hall

Results

Pos.	Club
1	(Turkey) Galatasaray MP
2	(Russia) Spartak OMSK
3	(Turkey) Yeşilyurt
4	(Russia) Loko Angara
5	(Ukraine) Ukrania NT
6	(Serbia) OK Crvena zvezda

=== Turkish Volleyball League 2011–12 ===
==== Regular season ====
October 13, 2011; 18:30	Fenerbahçe Universal	3 – 1	Galatasaray MP	Burhan Felek Spor Salonu; Referees: Serdar Nişancıoğlu, Ali Temel Öneri
October 13, 2011; 18:30	25–23, 22–25, 25–16, 25–16 (report)			Burhan Felek Spor Salonu; Referees: Serdar Nişancıoğlu, Ali Temel Öneri

October 16, 2011; 13:00	Galatasaray MP	3 – 0	Ankaragücü	Burhan Felek Spor Salonu; Referees: Cihat Fırıncıoğlu, Barış Sümen
October 16, 2011; 13:00	25–18, 25–18, 25–13 (report)			Burhan Felek Spor Salonu; Referees: Cihat Fırıncıoğlu, Barış Sümen

October 19, 2011; 15:00	İller Bankası	0 – 3	Galatasaray MP	Ankara Başkent Spor Salonu; Referees: Mehmet Demirdelen, Yasemin Altınel
October 19, 2011; 15:00	19–25, 14–25, 13–25 (report)			Ankara Başkent Spor Salonu; Referees: Mehmet Demirdelen, Yasemin Altınel

October 23, 2011; 19:30	Galatasaray MP	3 – 1	Ereğli Belediyesi	Burhan Felek Spor Salonu; Referees: Nurper Özbar, Tayfun Şener
October 23, 2011; 19:30	23–25, 26–24, 25–14, 25–19 (report)			Burhan Felek Spor Salonu; Referees: Nurper Özbar, Tayfun Şener

November 26, 2011; 15:00	Nilüfer Belediyesi	1 – 3	Galatasaray MP	Bursa Nilüfer Spor Salonu; Referees: Arzu Emiroğlu, Yasin Okumuş
November 26, 2011; 15:00	15–25, 19–25, 25–22, 16–25 (report)			Bursa Nilüfer Spor Salonu; Referees: Arzu Emiroğlu, Yasin Okumuş

December 4, 2011; 14:30	Galatasaray MP	3 – 0	Beşiktaş JK	Burhan Felek Spor Salonu; Referees: Ebru Meriçkan, Esat Danzili
December 4, 2011; 14:30	25–11, 25–23, 25–17 (report)			Burhan Felek Spor Salonu; Referees: Ebru Meriçkan, Esat Danzili

December 11, 2011; 16:00	İBA Kimya TED Kolejliler	0 – 3	Galatasaray MP	TOBB Spor Salonu; Referees: Onur Hoşnut, Hatice Özmen
December 11, 2011; 16:00	15–25, 21–25, 15–25 (report)			TOBB Spor Salonu; Referees: Onur Hoşnut, Hatice Özmen

December 19, 2011; 13:00	Galatasaray MP	3 – 1	Pursaklar V. İhtisas	Burhan Felek Spor Salonu; Referees: Erdal Akıncı, Bülent Kırmızı
December 19, 2011; 13:00	22–25, 25–18, 25–17, 25–23 (report)			Burhan Felek Spor Salonu; Referees: Erdal Akıncı, Bülent Kırmızı

December 25, 2011; 16:00	Yeşilyurt	1 – 3	Galatasaray MP	İstanbul Yeşilyurt Spor Salonu
December 25, 2011; 16:00	28–26, 12–25, 18–25, 18–25 (report)			İstanbul Yeşilyurt Spor Salonu

December 29, 2011; 19:30	Eczacıbaşı	3 – 0	Galatasaray MP	Burhan Felek Spor Salonu
December 29, 2011; 19:30	25–23, 25–15, 25–16 (report)			Burhan Felek Spor Salonu

=== Turkish Cup 2011–12 ===
November 24, 2011; 15:00	Pursaklar V. İhtisas	1 – 3	Galatasaray MP	Ankara Pursaklar Spor Salonu
November 24, 2011; 15:00	11–25, 18–25, 26–24, 22–25 (report)			Ankara Pursaklar Spor Salonu

=== CEV Cup 2011–12 ===
December 1, 2011; 19:30	Galatasaray MP	3 – 0	Apollon Limassol	TVF Burhan Felek Sport Hall; Attendance: 750; Referees: Hari Salabashyan, Vugar Jafarov
December 1, 2011; 19:30	25–11, 25–14, 25–20 (Report)			TVF Burhan Felek Sport Hall; Attendance: 750; Referees: Hari Salabashyan, Vugar Jafarov

December 8, 2011; 20:30	Apollon Limassol	0 – 3	Galatasaray MP	Apollon Hall Limassol; Attendance: 1,000; Referees: Ambarkov Ordanche, Vagni Ilaria
December 8, 2011; 20:30	15–25, 14–25, 18–25 (Report)			Apollon Hall Limassol; Attendance: 1,000; Referees: Ambarkov Ordanche, Vagni Ilaria
