= Funda =

- Gender: Female given name (Turkish, common in Turkey)
- Language: Turkish

Origin
- Meaning: "Heather, etymologically "tassle" from the Greek word "φούντα"

Funda is a Turkish feminine given name meaning "Heather", which may refer to:

== People ==
- Funda Arar (born 1975), Turkish singer
- Funda Bilgi (born 1983), Turkish volleyball player
- Funda Ergun, Turkish-American computer scientist
- Funda Güleç (born 2003), Turkish kickboxer
- Funda İyce Tuncel (born 1968), Turkish painter
- Funda Nakkaşoğlu (born 1995), Australian-Turkish basketball player
- Funda Önal (born 1984), English model of Turkish descent
- Funda Oru (born 1985), Belgian politician
- Funda Teoman (born 1984), Turkish pro basketball referee
- Funda Sevilay Erdal (born 1959), Turkish singer

== Places ==
- Funda, Cacuaco, Angola
