= Tuncel =

Tuncel ([tundʒel]) is a Turkish given name for males and a surname. Notable people with the surname include:

== Given name ==
- Tuncel Kurtiz (1936–2013), Turkish actor, playwright and film director

== Surname ==
- Funda İyce Tuncel (born 1968), Turkish female painter
- Merve Tuncel (born 2005), Turkish female swimmer
- Sebahat Tuncel (born 1975), Turkish female politician
