= Bilgi =

Bilgi or Bilagi may refer to:

== Places ==
- Bilgi, Karnataka, a town and taluk (sub-district) in the Bagalkot district of Karnataka, India
- Bilgi, a small village in Siddapura, Uttara Kannada, Karnataka, India
- Istanbul Bilgi University

== People ==
- Funda Bilgi, Turkish volleyball player
