= Mehmet Bedestenlioğlu =

Turkish volleyball player and coach

Personal information
- Nationality: Turkish
- Born: 22 February 1959 (age 67); Tokat, Turkey

Coaching information
- Current team: PTT Spor
Previous teams coached
Years	Teams
1984–1986; 1986–1989; 1989–1993; 1996–1999; 2001–2002; 2007; 2007–2008; 2009; 2010; 2011–2013; 2013; 2013; 2015; 2016–2019; 2019–	Ankara DSİ GSK; Emlak TOKİ; Galatasaray; Galatasaray; Eczacıbaşı; Turkey U18; Galatasaray; Turkey U20; Turkey; Sarıyer Belediyesi; Turkey U18; Turkey U23; Turkey U18; Beylikdüzü; PTT Spor

Volleyball information
- Position: Hitter

Career
Years	Teams
1975–1986	Ankara DSİ Spor

National team
Turkey

Mehmet Bedestenlioğlu (born 22 February 1959) is a Turkish volleyball coach. He's been coaching Turkish side PTT Spor since 2019.
