= Yuliya Buyeva =

Ukrainian volleyball player (born 1975)

Personal information
- Nationality: Ukrainian
- Born: 24 December 1975 (age 50)
- Height: 186 cm (6 ft 1 in)

Volleyball information

National team
- Years: Team
- –: Ukraine

Yuliya Buyeva (born 24 December 1975) is a former Ukrainian volleyball player. She was part of the Ukraine women's national volleyball team at the 1996 Summer Olympics. She played for Universidad Granada, Galatasaray S.K. in the 1999–00 season, Post SV Wien, Dresdner SC, Berlin 68, Beşiktaş, Universidad Burgos as well as for several Ukrainian clubs (Sokil Kyiv, Iskra Luhansk, Jinestra Odesa).
