= Funda Teoman =

Turkish basketball referee (born 1984)

Zeynep Funda Teoman
- Born: March 30, 1984 (age 42)
- Basketball career
- Position: Turkish Basketball Super League, Turkish Women's Basketball League referee
- Officiating career: ?–present

Zeynep Funda Teoman (born March 30, 1984) is a Turkish female pro basketball referee.

== Private life ==
Zeynep Funda Teoman was born on March 30, 1984, to a father, who was a teacher of physical education. Her two older brothers are basketball referees.

== Sporting career ==
Teoman began with basketball playing already in her early age. However, she quit because she found herself not talented. As she did not want to come off basketball, she decided to become a referee. She began her career at the age of 15 serving as scorer and timekeeper. She successfully completed a course for officials at the age of 18. She officiated matches in minor level competitions as a C- and then B-category referee. Still a B-category official, she debuted internationally at the 6th FIBA Europe International Basketball Camp for U15 Girls held in Postojna, Slovenia in 2012.

She was promoted to A-category official, the highest official position in the country. She became so one of the only three female pro basketball referees in Turkey along with Özlem Yalman and Ayşenur Yazıcıoğlu. From the 2012–13 seas on, she is entitled to officiate in the Turkish Basketball Super League and Turkish Women's Basketball League. In the 2014–15 season, she was relegated to B-category, and in the 2016–17 season to C-category official.
