= Turkey women's national under-23 volleyball team =

Turkey U23
- Association: Turkish Volleyball Federation
- Confederation: CEV

Uniforms
Home	Away	Third

FIVB U23 World Championship
- Appearances: 3 (First in 2013)
- Best result: (gold) 1st Place : (2017)
- tvf.org.tr

The Turkey women's national under-23 volleyball team represents Turkey in international women's volleyball competitions and friendly matches under age 23. It is governed by the Turkish Volleyball Federation that is a part of the Federation of International Volleyball FIVB and also of the European Volleyball Confederation CEV.

== Results ==
=== FIVB U23 World Championship ===
Champions Runners up Third place Fourth place

FIVB U23 World Championship
Year	Round	Position	Pld	W	L	SW	SL	Squad
(Mexico) 2013		5th place						Squad
(Turkey) 2015		Runners-UP						Squad
(Slovenia) 2017		Champions						Squad
Total	1 Title	3/3						

== Team ==
=== Current squad ===
The following is the Turkish roster in the 2017 FIVB Women's U23 World Championship.

Head coach: Ataman Guneyligil

No.	Name	Date of birth	Height	Weight	Spike	Block	2016–2017 club
2	Tuğba Şenoğlu	2 February 1998	1.84 m (6 ft 0 in)	64 kg (141 lb)	275 cm (108 in)	270 cm (110 in)	(Turkey) Beşiktaş
4	Beyza Arici	27 July 1995	1.92 m (6 ft 4 in)	82 kg (181 lb)	302 cm (119 in)	293 cm (115 in)	(Turkey) Eczacıbaşı VitrA
5	Ayça Aykaç	27 February 1996	1.76 m (5 ft 9 in)	54 kg (119 lb)	280 cm (110 in)	279 cm (110 in)	(Turkey) VakıfBank
7	Çağla Akın (c)	19 January 1995	1.77 m (5 ft 10 in)	70 kg (150 lb)	300 cm (120 in)	280 cm (110 in)	(Turkey) Beşiktaş
9	Asli Kalac	13 December 1995	1.83 m (6 ft 0 in)	73 kg (161 lb)	310 cm (120 in)	300 cm (120 in)	(Turkey) Galatasaray Daikin
10	Ezgi Dilik	12 June 1995	1.70 m (5 ft 7 in)	60 kg (130 lb)	282 cm (111 in)	287 cm (113 in)	(Turkey) Fenerbahçe
12	Bihter Dumanoğlu	3 February 1995	1.70 m (5 ft 7 in)	70 kg (150 lb)	279 cm (110 in)	275 cm (108 in)	(Turkey) Galatasaray Daikin
15	Hande Baladin	1 September 1997	1.89 m (6 ft 2 in)	71 kg (157 lb)	310 cm (120 in)	300 cm (120 in)	(Turkey) Eczacıbaşı VitrA
16	Saliha Şahin	5 November 1998	1.85 m (6 ft 1 in)	62 kg (137 lb)	282 cm (111 in)	275 cm (108 in)	(Turkey) Karayolları
17	Nursevil Aydınlar	28 November 1995	1.87 m (6 ft 2 in)	64 kg (141 lb)	293 cm (115 in)	285 cm (112 in)	(Turkey) Galatasaray Daikin
18	Zehra Güneş	7 July 1999	1.94 m (6 ft 4 in)	82 kg (181 lb)	309 cm (122 in)	255 cm (100 in)	(Turkey) Beşiktaş
19	Ebrar Karakurt	17 January 2000	1.94 m (6 ft 4 in)	72 kg (159 lb)	307 cm (121 in)	305 cm (120 in)	(Turkey) VakıfBank

=== Notable players ===
- Beyza Arıcı
- Hatice Gizem Örge
- Hande Baladın : MVP
- Kübra Akman

== See also ==
  - Men's
- Turkey Men's national volleyball team
- Turkey Men's national volleyball team U23
- Turkey Men's national volleyball team U21
- Turkey Men's national volleyball team U19
  - Women's
- Turkey Women's national volleyball team
- Turkey Women's national volleyball team U23
- Turkey Women's national volleyball team U20
- Turkey Women's national volleyball team U18
