= Dilara Bilge =

Turkish volleyball player (born 1990)

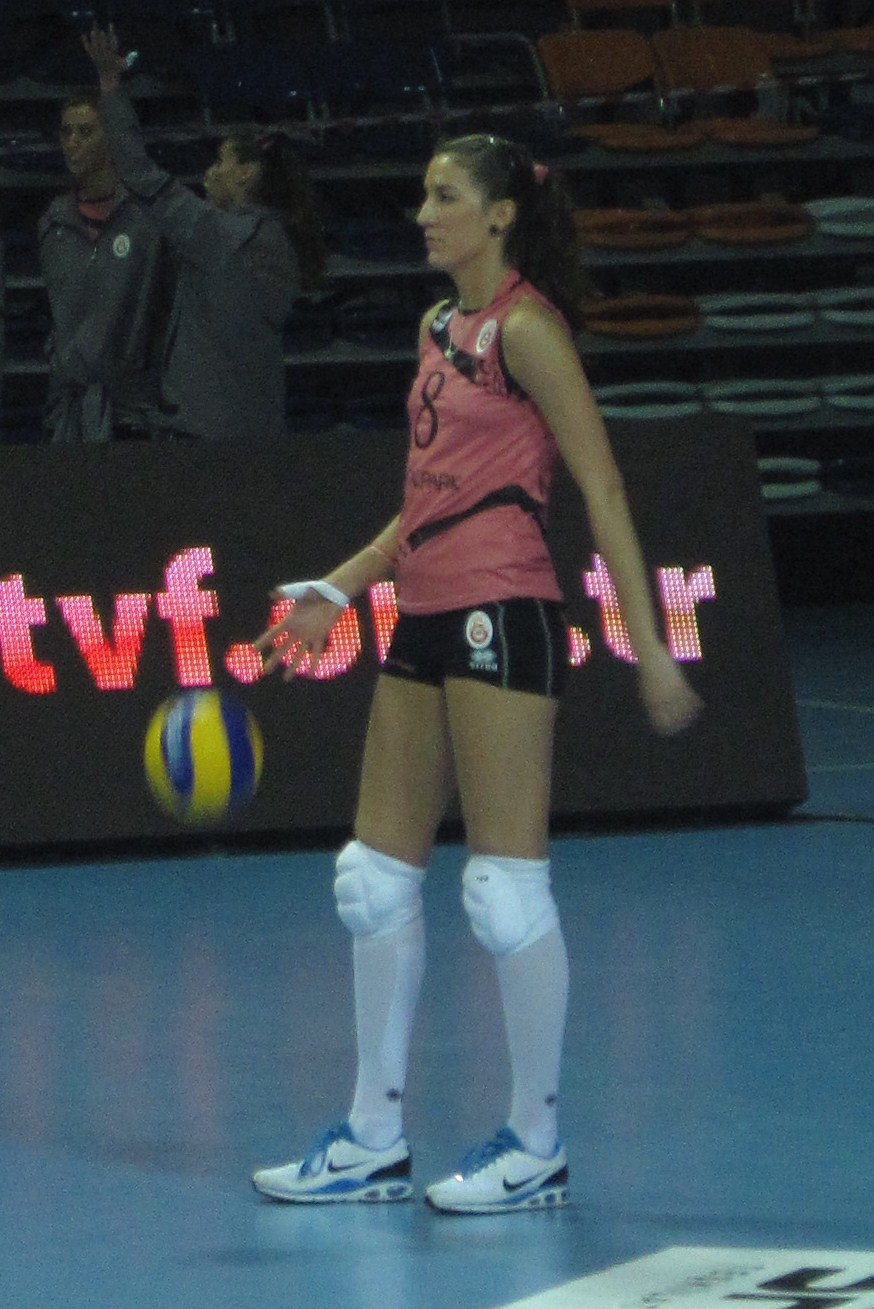

Personal information
- Full name: Dilara Bilge
- Born: August 20, 1990 (age 36); Turkey
- Height: 1.95 m (6 ft 5 in)

Volleyball information
- Position: Opposite hitter
- Current club: (Japan) JT Marvelous
- Number: 8

Career
Years
- 2007–08
- 2008–13
Teams
- (Turkey) Galatasaray Youth Team
- (Turkey) Galatasaray Medical Park

National team
Turkey
- Last updated: November 3, 2013

Dilara Bilge (born August 20, 1990) is a Turkish volleyball player. She is 195 cm and plays as opposite hitter.

She played for Galatasaray Medical Park before she was transferred by the Japanese club JT Marvelous in September 2013.

== See also ==
- Turkish women in sports
