= Nazlı Eda Kafkas =

Turkish volleyball player (born 2001)

Personal information
- Full name: Nazlı Eda Kafkas
- Born: November 16, 2001 (age 24) Turkey
- Height: 1.80 m (5 ft 11 in)
- Weight: 62 kg (137 lb)
- Spike: 285 cm (112 in)
- Block: 275 cm (108 in)

Volleyball information
- Position: Setter
- Current club: Nilüfer Belediyespor

Career
- Years: Team
- 2019–2021; 2020–2022; 2021–2022; 2022–2023; 2023–: Vakıfbank Istanbul II; Vakıfbank Istanbul; → Yeşilyurt; Galatasaray; Nilüfer Belediyespor

National team
- Years: Team
- Turkey
Honours
Women's volleyball
Representing Turkey
Islamic Solidarity Games
Gold medal – first place	2025 Rıyadh	Team

Nazlı Eda Kafkas (born November 16, 2001) is a Turkish volleyball player. She is 1.80 m (5 ft 11 in) tall at 62 kg (137 lb) and plays in the Setter position. She plays for Nilüfer Belediyespor.

== Club career ==
=== Vakıfbank Istanbul ===
Born in 2001 from Vakıfbank Istanbul infrastructure on 10 October 2020, setter Kafkas took time in the official match for the first time in front of Beylikdüzü Voleybol İhtisas.

=== Yeşilyurt ===
On 18 May 2021, she signed a 1-year loan contract with Yeşilyurt, one of the Sultans League teams.

=== Galatasaray ===
She signed a 1-year contract with Galatasaray on August 15, 2022.

== International career ==
Kafkas was part of the Turkey team, which became champion at the 2025 Islamic Solidarity Games in Riyadh, Saudi Arabia.

== Honours ==
Turkey
(gold) 2025 Islamic Solidarity Games
