= Derya Çayırgan =

Turkish volleyball player (born 1995)

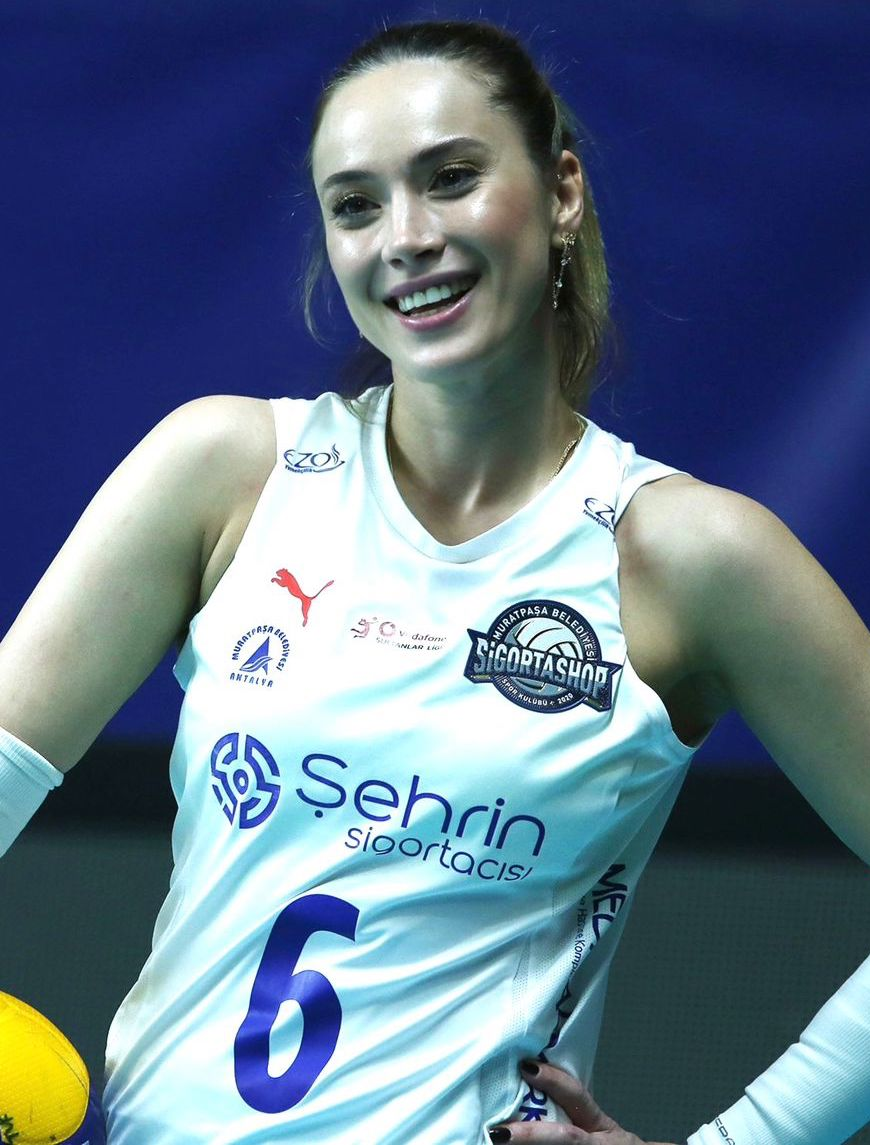

Personal information
- Born: October 9, 1987 (age 39); Istanbul, Turkey
- Height: 1.68 m (5 ft 6 in)
- Weight: 58 kg (128 lb)
- Spike: 270 cm (110 in)
- Block: 260 cm (100 in)

Volleyball information
- Position: Libero

Career
Years
- 2005–2010
- 2010–2012
- 2012–2013
- 2013–2014
- 2014–2015
- 2015–2016
- 2016–2019
- 2019–2021
- 2021–2022
Teams
- Yeşilyurt
- Ereğli Belediye
- Galatasaray
- Fenerbahçe
- Karşıyaka
- Çanakkale Belediye
- Halkbank
- Galatasaray
- Çukurova Belediyespor

Derya Çayırgan (born October 9, 1987 in Istanbul, Turkey) is a Turkish former volleyball player. She is 168 cm (5.51 ft) tall at 58 kg (128 lb). She played as a defensive specialist (libero).

As a result of Turkish Anti-Doping Commission's 2.1 Detection of a Prohibited Substance or its Metabolites or Markers in a Sample Collected from an Athlete (Furosemide), the Athlete is suspended from sport for 1 year, effective 18 October 2024. The ban will expire on 18 October 2025.
