= Ebru Elhan =

Turkish volleyball player

Personal information
- Full name: Ebru Elhan Bayram
- Born: 19 February 1982 (age 44); Kayseri, Turkey
- Height: 1.85 m (6 ft 1 in)

Volleyball information
- Position: Outside hitter
- Current club: Ereğli Belediyesi
- Number: 7

Career
Years	Teams
1998–2000; 2000–2001; 2001–2003; 2003–2006; 2006–2007; 2007–2009; 2009–2011	Güneş Sigorta; Bursaspor; Yeşilyurt; VakıfBank Güneş Sigorta; Emlak TOKI; Türk Telekom Ankara; Galatasaray Medical Park

National team
2001–present	Turkey
Honours
Representing Turkey
Women's volleyball
Silver medal – second place	2003 Turkey

Ebru Elhan (born 19 February 1982 in Kayseri) is a Turkish volleyball player. She plays as outside hitter.

== Biography ==
She played for the Turkey women's national volleyball team, at the 2003 Women's European Volleyball Championship.

She plays for club team Ereğli Belediyesi.

== See also ==
- Turkish women in sports
