= Gökhan Edman =

Turkish volleyball coach

Personal information
- Nationality: Turkish
- Born: 11 December 1964 (age 61); Ankara, Turkey

Volleyball information
- Position: Head coach

Career
Years
- 1998–2000
- 2000–2002
- 2002–2003
- 2008–2011
- 2012
- 2012
- 2013–2018
Teams
- Eczacıbaşı
- Galatasaray
- VakıfBank
- Galatasaray
- Turkey U20
- Turkey U19
- Sarıyer Belediyesi

Gökhan Edman (born 11 December 1964) is a Turkish volleyball coach.

== Career ==
As of December 2, 2008, he will be in charge of the Galatasaray Women's A team and youth teams.
