= Zeynep Seda Uslu =

Turkish volleyball player (born 1983)

Personal information
- Full name: Zeynep Seda Uslu
- Born: October 30, 1983 (age 43) Turkey
- Height: 1.80 m (5 ft 11 in)
- Weight: 73 kg (161 lb)

Volleyball information
- Position: Setter
- Current club: Fenerbahçe Universal

National team
- Years: Team
- –: Turkey

Zeynep Seda Uslu (born October 30, 1983) is a Turkish volleyball player. She is 180 cm and plays as setter. She plays for Turkish professional club Fenerbahçe Universal.

She started her volleyball career with VakıfBank Güneş Sigorta (1999-05) and also played for Eczacıbaşı Zenitiva (2006–09), Beşiktaş (2009–10) and Galatasaray Medical Park (2005–06 and 2010–11) before transferred to Fenerbahçe Universal.

- Turkish League: 2004, 2005, 2007, 2008
- Turkish Cup: 2009
- Top Teams Cup: 2004

== See also ==
- Turkish women in sports
