= Güldeniz Önal =

Turkish volleyball player (born 1986)

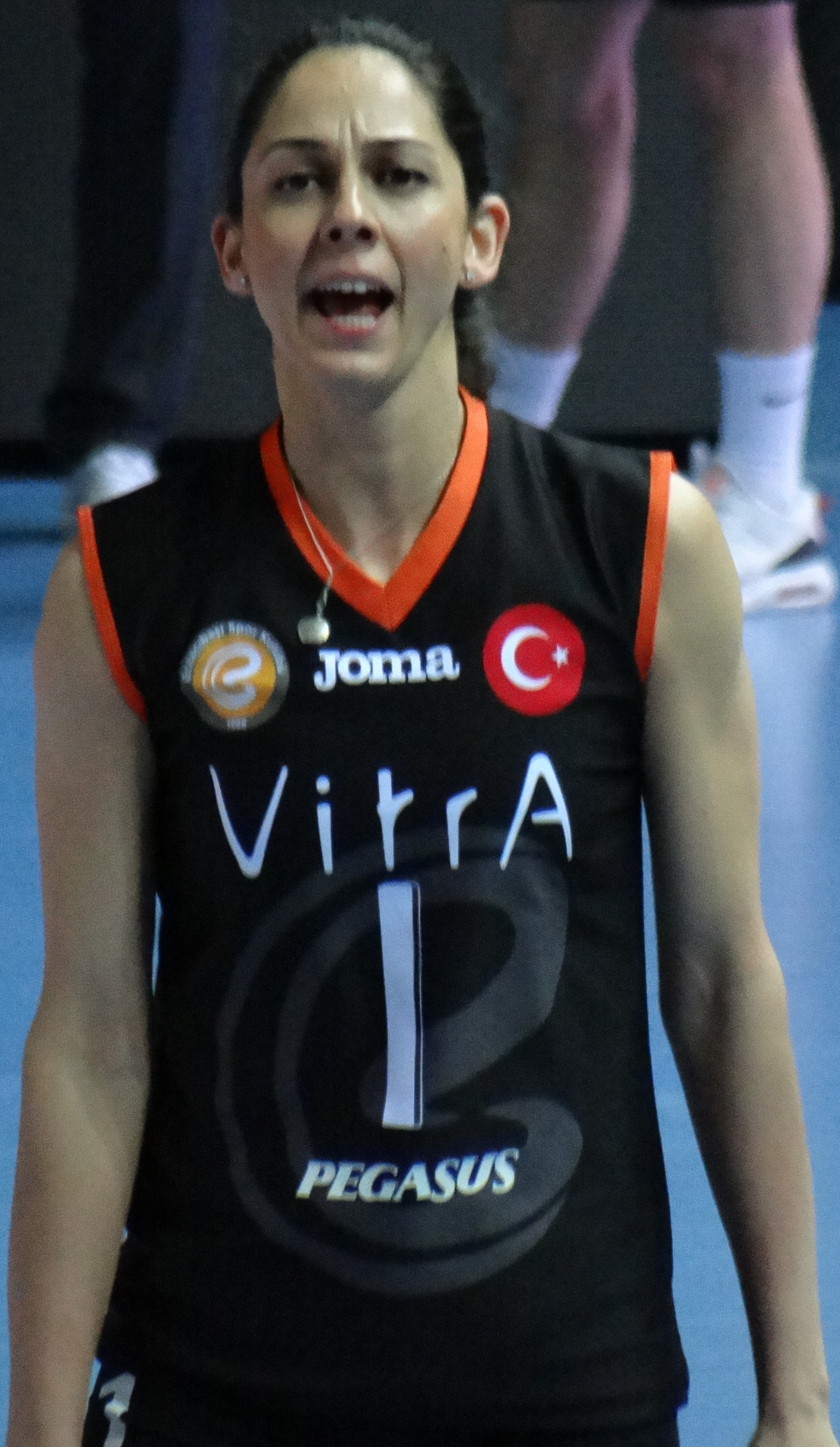

Personal information
- Full name: Güldeniz Önal Paşaoğlu
- Nationality: Turkish
- Born: 25 March 1986 (age 40); İzmir, Turkey
- Hometown: Ankara, Turkey
- Height: 1.83 m (6 ft 0 in)
- Weight: 75 kg (165 lb)
- Spike: 303 cm (119 in)
- Block: 295 cm (116 in)

Volleyball information
- Position: Outside hitter
- Current club: Kuzeyboru

Career
Years	Teams
2003–2008; 2008–2015; 2015–2017; 2017–2019; 2019–2021; 2021–2022; 2022–	İller Bankası; VakıfBank; Galatasaray; Eczacıbaşı VitrA; Galatasaray; Aydın Büyükşehir Belediyespor; Çukurova Belediyespor

National team
Turkey
Medal record
Women's volleyball
Representing Turkey
World Grand Prix
Bronze medal – third place	2012 Ningbo
European Championships
Bronze medal – third place	2011 Italy/Serbia
Bronze medal – third place	2017 Azerbaijan/Georgia
European Games
Gold medal – first place	2015 Baku	Team
Mediterranean Games
Silver medal – second place	2013 Mersin	Team

Güldeniz Önal Paşaoğlu (born 25 March 1986) is a Turkish volleyball player. She is 183 cm and plays as outside hitter.

== Personal info ==
She studied at Gazi University.

== Career ==
Önal win the 2010–11 CEV Champions League with her team VakıfBank Güneş Sigorta Türk Telekom.

Önal won the gold medal at the 2013 Club World Championship playing with Vakıfbank Istanbul.

== Awards ==
=== Clubs ===
- 2010-11 CEV Champions League - Champion, with VakıfBank Güneş Sigorta Türk Telekom
- 2011 FIVB Women's Club World Championship - Runner-Up, with VakıfBank Türk Telekom
- 2011-12 Turkish Women's Volleyball League - Runner-Up, with Vakıfbank Spor Kulübü
- 2012-13 Turkish Cup - Champion, with Vakıfbank Spor Kulübü
- 2012–13 CEV Champions League - Champion, with Vakıfbank Spor Kulübü
- 2012-13 Turkish Women's Volleyball League - Champion, with Vakıfbank Spor Kulübü
- 2013 Club World Championship - Champion, with Vakıfbank Istanbul
- 2013-14 CEV Champions League - Runner-Up, with Vakıfbank Istanbul
- 2014-15 CEV Champions League - Third Place, with Vakıfbank Istanbul
- 2016-17 Turkish Women's Volleyball League - Runner-Up, with Galatasaray Spor Kulübü

=== National team ===
- 2011 European Championship - Bronze medal
- 2012 FIVB World Grand Prix - Bronze medal
- 2013 Mediterranean Games - Silver medal
- 2015 European Games - Gold medal

== See also ==
- Turkish women in sports
