= Seray Altay =

Turkish volleyball player (born 1987)

Personal information
- Full name: Seray Altay
- Born: August 28, 1987 (age 39); Ankara, Turkey
- Height: 1.82 m (5 ft 11 1/2 in)

Volleyball information
- Position: Opposite

Career
Years	Teams
2001-2007; 2007-2008; 2008-2009; 2009-2010; 2010-2011; 2011-2012; 2012-2014; 2014-2015; 2015-2018; 2018-2019; 2020-2021	Eczacıbaşı; Yeşilyurt; Galatasaray; Eczacıbaşı Zentiva; VakıfBank; Galatasaray; Yeşilyurt; Beşiktaş JK; Sarıyer Belediyesi; Beylikdüzü; Beşiktaş JK

National team
2008-present	Turkey

Seray Altay (born August 28, 1987) is a Turkish volleyball player. She is 182 cm and plays as opposite.

== Career ==
With VakıfBank Güneş Sigorta Türk Telekom Seray won the 2010–11 CEV Champions League.

She plays for Galatasaray Medical Park.

== Awards ==
=== Clubs ===
- 2010/11 CEV Champions League - Champion, with VakıfBank Güneş Sigorta Türk Telekom
- 2011-12 Turkish Cup - Runner-up, with Galatasaray Daikin
- 2011-12 CEV Cup - Runner-up, with Galatasaray Daikin

== See also ==
- Turkish women in sports
