= Emine Arıcı =

Turkish volleyball player (born 1997)

Personal information
- Nationality: Turkey
- Born: 17 January 1997 (age 29)
- Home town: İzmir, Turkey
- Height: 192 cm (6 ft 4 in)
- Weight: 85 kg (187 lb)

Volleyball information
- Position: Middle-blocker
- Current club: (Turkey) Türk Hava Yolları
- Number: 3

Career
- Years: Team
- 2018–2019: (Turkey) Pursaklar
- 2019–2020: (Turkey) Küçükyalı Yelken Spor
- 2020: (Turkey) Edremit Belediyesi Altınoluk SK
- 2020–2021: (Turkey) Çan Gençlik Kale Spor AK
- 2021–2023: (Turkey) Aydın Büyükşehir Belediyespor
- 2023–2024: (Turkey) Galatasaray HDI Sigorta
- 2024–: (Turkey) Türk Hava Yolları

National team
- Years: Team
- 2022–: Turkey
Honours
Women's volleyball
Representing Turkey
Islamic Solidarity Games
Gold medal – first place	2021 Konya	Team

Emine Arıcı (born 17 January 1997 in İzmir) is a Turkish volleyball player who plays as a middle blocker for Türk Hava Yolları and the Turkey women's national volleyball team.

== Career ==
=== Galatasaray ===
On 19 January 2023, she signed a 1.5-year contract with Galatasaray HDI Sigorta.
