= İlkin Aydın =

Turkish volleyball player (born 2000)

- Aydın in 2026

Personal information
- Full name: İlkin Aydın
- Nickname: İkkan
- Born: 5 January 2000 (age 26) Ankara, Turkey
- Height: 1.83 m (6 ft 0 in)
- Weight: 67 kg (148 lb)
- Spike: 299 cm (118 in)
- Block: 298 cm (117 in)

Volleyball information
- Position: Outside hitter
- Current club: Galatasaray
- Number: 22 (national team), 2 (club)

Career
- Years: Team
- 2015–2016; 2016–2017; 2017–present: İlbank; TVF Spor Lisesi; Galatasaray

National team
- Years: Team
- 2017; 2018; 2018–present: Turkey U-18; Turkey U-19; Turkey
Honours
Women's volleyball
Representing Turkey
FIVB World Championship
Silver medal – second place	2025 Thailand	Team
FIVB Nations League
Gold medal – first place	2023 Arlington	Team
Gold medal – first place	2026 Macau	Team
Women's European Volleyball Championship
Gold medal – first place	2023 European Championship	Team
Gold medal – first place	2026 Azerbaijan/Czech Republic/Sweden/Turkey	Team
Bronze medal – third place	2021 Serbia/Bulgaria/Croatia/Romania	Team
Islamic Solidarity Games
Gold medal – first place	2021 Konya	Team

İlkin Aydın (born 5 January 2000) is a Turkish professional volleyball player who plays as an outside hitter for Galatasaray.

== Club career ==
Aydın played at İlbank in 2015-2016 and then at TVF Sports High School between 2016 and 2017.

=== Galatasaray ===
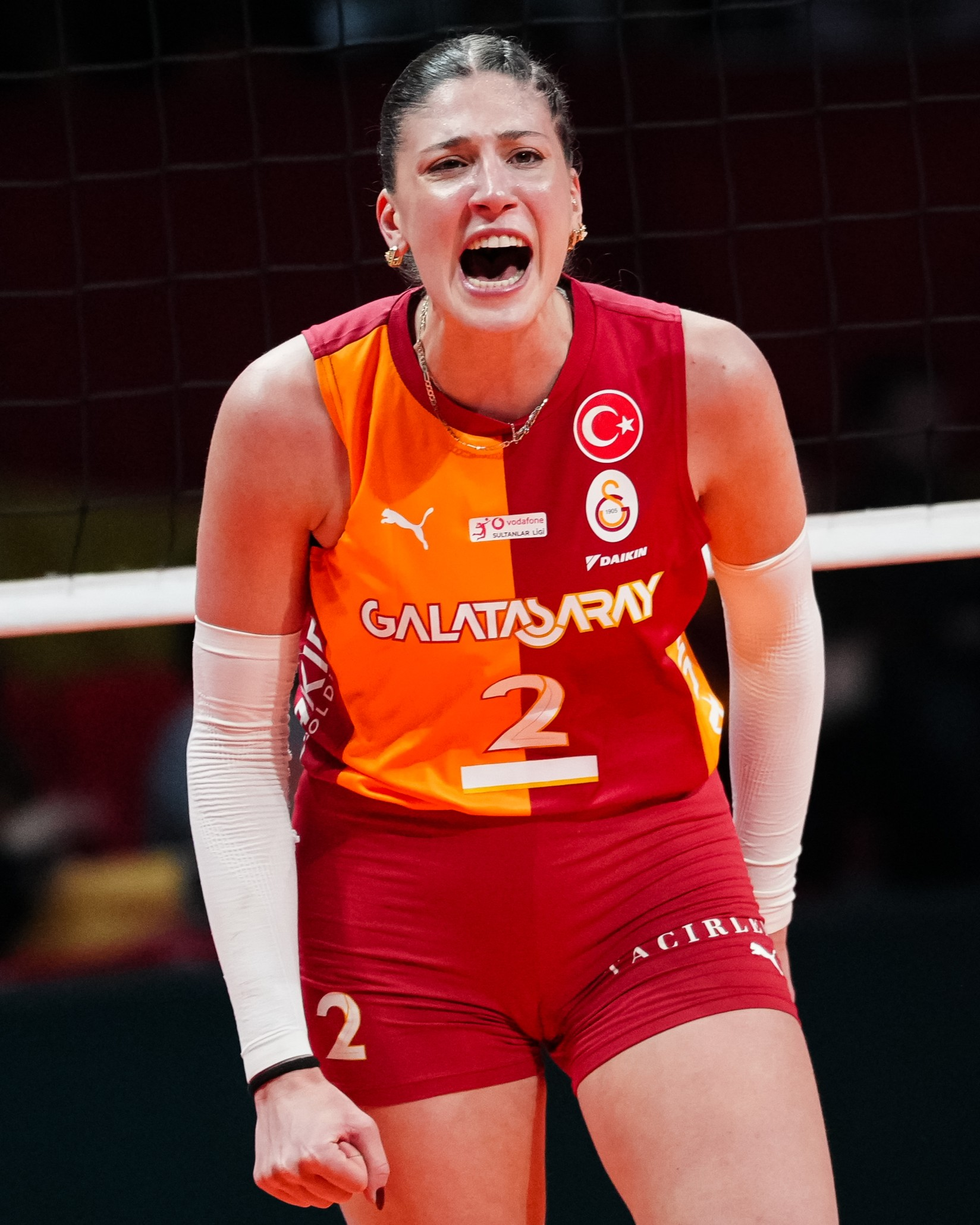
Aydın in 2026

Aydın transferred to Galatasaray for three years on 5 August 2017.

On 8 August 2022, she signed a new 3-year contract with Galatasaray.

She signed a new 2-year contract with Galatasaray on 26 December 2023.

On January 30, 2026, Galatasaray signed a new two-year contract with team captain Aydın.

== International career ==
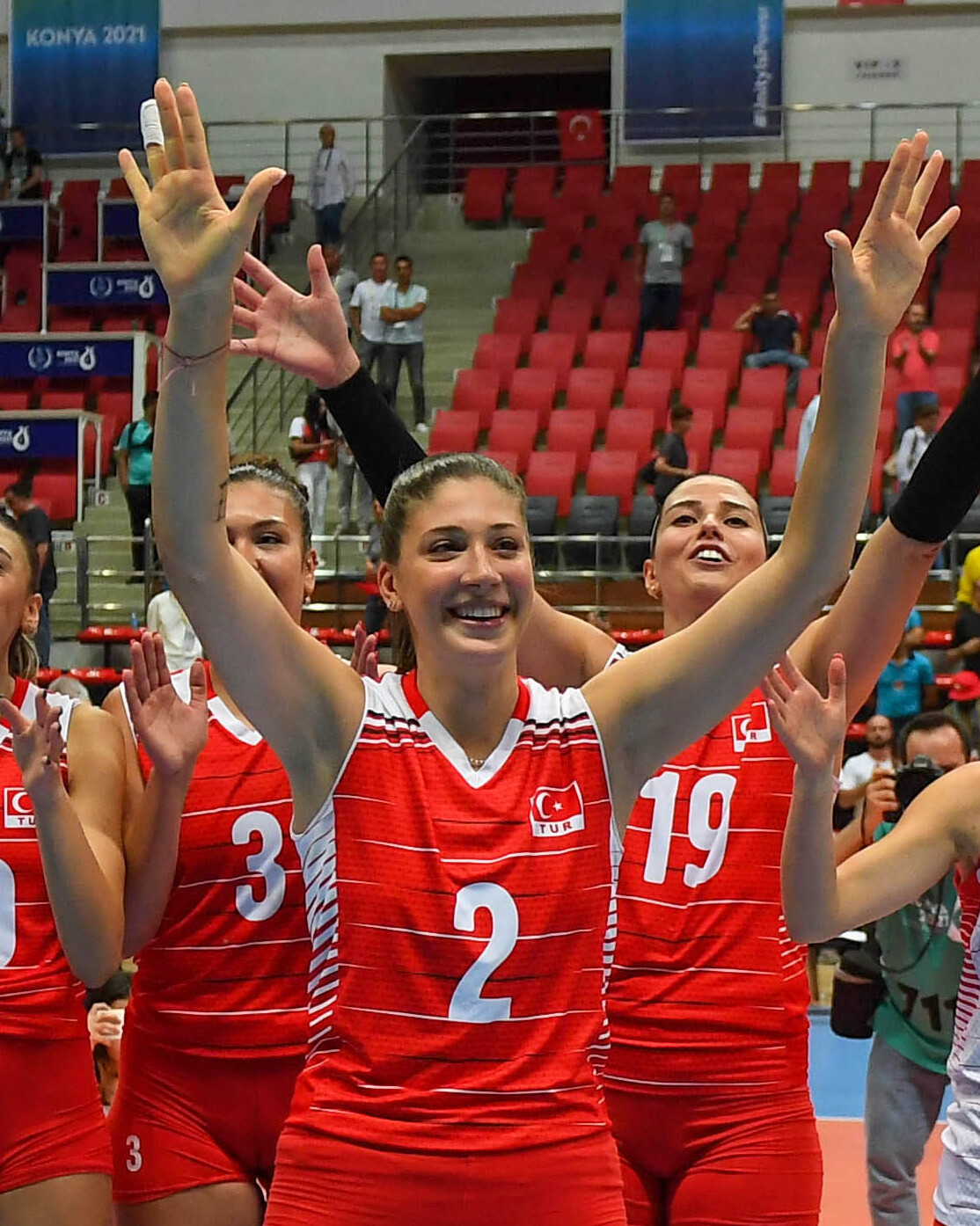
Aydın in 2021

She was part of the Turkey women's national volleyball team, which became champion at the 2023 Women's European Volleyball Championship.

== Honours ==
=== Individuals ===
- 2025–26 CEV Cup – "Most valuable player"

=== National team ===
- 2021 European Championship – Bronze Medal
- 2023 Nations League - Gold Medal
- 2023 European Championship – Gold Medal
- 2023 World Cup – Gold Medal
- 2025 World Championship – Silver Medal
- 2026 Nations League - Gold Medal
- 2026 European Championship – Gold Medal

=== Clubs ===
- 2020–21 CEV Cup Runner-Up, with Galatasaray
- 2023–24 BVA Cup Champion, with Galatasaray
- 2024–25 BVA Cup Champion, with Galatasaray
- 2025–26 CEV Cup Champion, with Galatasaray

== Education ==
She continues her education at Üsküdar University, Faculty of Communication, Visual Communication and Design Department.
