= Ataman Güneyligil =

Turkish volleyball coach (born 1981)

Personal information
- Nationality: Turkish
- Born: 6 September 1981 (age 45); Istanbul, Turkey

Volleyball information
- Position: Head coach
- Current club: Göztepe SK

Career
Years
- 2003–2006
- 2006–2008
- 2008–2010
- 2010–2011
- 2011–2015
- 2013
- 2015
- 2015–2023
- 2017
- 2017
- 2023
- 2023
- 2023–2024
- 2024–
Teams
- VakıfBank (assistant)
- Beşiktaş (assistant)
- Galatasaray (assistant)
- Dicle Üniversitesi
- Galatasaray (assistant)
- Turkey U23 (assistant)
- Turkey U20
- Galatasaray
- Turkey U23
- Turkey (assistant)
- Azerbaijan
- PAOK Thessaloniki
- Çukurova Belediyesi Spor Kulübü
- Göztepe SK

Ataman Güneyligil (born 6 September 1981) is a Turkish volleyball coach. He is the current head coach of the Göztepe SK.

== Career ==
=== Galatasaray ===
Güneyligil was appointed as the head coach of the Galatasaray Women's Volleyball Team on 20 August 2015.

On 3 August 2022, Galatasaray signed a new 2-year contract with Head Coach Güneyligil.

On 29 March 2023, he announced on his social media account that he would leave Galatasaray at the end of the 2022–23 season.

=== Azerbaijan women's national team ===
In May 2023, Güneyligil was appointed head coach of the Azerbaijan women's national volleyball team, which play in the 2023 Women's European Volleyball Championship.
