= Funda İyce Tuncel =

Turkish artist

- Born: 1968 (age 57–58); Ankara, Ankara Province, Turkey
- Education: Gazi University, Art Department
- Known for: Painting, Founder of the Contemporary Arts Foundation
- Awards: World Art Foundation Art Fair, Orange County California, World Art Expo 09, 3rd place; DYO 31. Resim Yarışması, display; Sağlık Ve Sosyal Hizmet Emekçileri Sendikası 6. Kültür Sanat Yarışması Resim 1st place
- Website: fundaiycetuncel.com

Funda İyce Tuncel (born 1968, in Ankara) is a Turkish painter and founding member of the Contemporary Arts Foundation.

She was born in Ankara, Turkey in 1968. She received education in Gazi University in the Art Department. From 1992 to 1995, she worked as an art consultant at the Atatürk Cultural Center.

She became a member of several organizations including "The International Fine Arts Society" (Turkish: Uluslararası Plastik Sanatçılar Derneği, UPSD), "Pan-Mediterranean Women Artists Network" (FAM) (Turkish: Akdeniz Kadın Sanatçılar Birliği), and the "United Painters and Sculptors Society" (Turkish: Birleşmiş Ressamlar ve Heykeltraşlar Derneği, BRHD), of which she was the Secretary-General from 1998 to 2002. She was also the founder and first member of the "Contemporary Arts Foundation" (Turkish: Çağdaş Sanatlar Vakfı, ÇAĞSAV). She was also a founding member of the "International Knidos Culture and Arts Academy" (Turkish: Uluslararası Kinidos Kültür Sanat Akademisi, UKKSA).

In 2008 she published her first book detailing her methods and artwork, and a second book, Göç İmgeleri, in 2013.

She has had 44 personal expositions at several places including one at the Grand National Assembly, and also many collaborative exhibitions.
