= Ezgi Güç =

Turkish volleyball player (born 1992)

Ezgi Arslan

Personal information
- Full name: Ezgi Güç-Arslan
- Nationality: Turkish
- Born: 23 March 1992 (age 34)
- Height: 181 cm (5 ft 11 in)
- Weight: 59 kg (130 lb)
- Spike: 280 cm (110 in)
- Block: 275 cm (108 in)

Volleyball information
- Number: 15 (national team)

Career
Years	Teams
2013	GALATASARAY

National team
2013	Turkey

Ezgi Güç-Arslan (born 23 March 1992) is a Turkish female volleyball player. She was part of the Turkey women's national volleyball team.

She participated in the 2013 FIVB Volleyball World Grand Prix. On club level she played for GALATASARAY in 2013.

== Clubs ==
Club	From	To
Turkey SGK Ankara	2008-2009	2009-2010
Turkey Galatasaray İstanbul	2010-2011	2010-2011
Turkey Ereğli Belediye	2011-2012	2011-2012
Turkey Galatasaray İstanbul	2012-2013	2016-2017
Turkey Anakent Spor Kulübü	2017-2018	...
