= Natalia Hanikoğlu =

Turkish-Russian volleyball player (born 1975)

Personal information
- Nationality: Russia Turkey
- Born: Natalya Nikolaevna Belyaeva; 23 June 1975 (age 51); Moscow, Russia
- Height: 1.90 m (6 ft 3 in)
- Weight: 76 kg (168 lb)
- Spike: 308 cm (121 in)
- Block: 302 cm (119 in)

Volleyball information
- Position: Outside hitter
- Current club: Beşiktaş Bahçeşehir Üniversitesi
- Number: 7

National team
1994–99; 1999-08	Russia; Turkey
Medal record
Women's volleyball
Representing Turkey
European Championships
Silver medal – second place	Turkey 2003	Team
Mediterranean Games
Gold medal – first place	2005 Almeria	Team

Natalia Hanikoğlu (née Belyaeva, born 23 June 1975) is a Turkish-Russian volleyball player. She is 190 cm tall and plays as a middle blocker and outside hitter. She plays for Galatasaray Medical Park and wears the number 7 jersey. She played over 100 times for the Russia national team, and when she received Turkish citizenship after marrying Turkish former volleyball player Hakan Hanikoğlu, she played over 200 times for the Turkey national team, too. She has a daughter whose name is Ela (meaning: Hazel) born in Moscow.

She also played for CSKA Moscow, Zarechie Odintsovo in Russia, Ancona in Italy, Kocaelispor, Beşiktaş and Eczacıbaşı in Turkey.

== Awards ==
=== Club ===
- 2011–12 Turkish Cup – Runner-up, with Galatasaray Daikin
- 2011–12 CEV Cup – Runner-up, with Galatasaray Daikin

== See also ==
- Turkish women in sports
