= Arzu Göllü =

Turkish volleyball player (born 1969)

Personal information
- Full name: Arzu Göllü
- Born: 1 January 1969 (age 57); Istanbul, Turkey
- Height: 1.73 m (5 ft 8 in)

Volleyball information
- Position: Settler

Career
Years	Teams
1991–2000; 2000–2001; 2006–2007; 2007–2010; 2010–2011	Eczacıbaşı; Beşiktaş; DYO Karşıyaka; VakıfBank Güneş Sigorta; Galatasaray Medical Park

National team
1988–2010	Turkey

Arzu Göllü (born 1969) is a retired Turkish volleyball player. She is one of the most talented female volleyball players in Turkish sports history and daughter of Cengiz Göllü, the legendary volleyball player, who also served as the technical director of Turkish national volleyball team for many years.

She is 172 cm, and plays as settler. She is signed for Galatasaray Medical Park.

She started her professional career with Eczacıbaşı Istanbul where she played for 9 years, till 2000, and earned her ongoing reputation as the "captain" of the best known women's volleyball team in Turkey.

She also played for Beşiktaş J.K. and Karşıyaka S.K. and she wore the captain strip for Beşiktaş J.K. and Karşıyaka S.K. as well as Eczacıbaşı Istanbul.

She played over 270 times for the Turkish National Volleyball Team during her successful career.

== Achievements ==
- 9 kez 'Türk Ligi Şampiyonu': (1985–86, 1986–87, 1987–88, 1988–89, 1993–94, 1994–95, 1998–99, 1999–00, 2000–01)
- 3 kere 'türk Kupası Şampiyonu': (1998–99, 1999–00, 2000–01)
- 3 kere 'Başkanlar Kupası Şampiyonu': (1988–89, 1990–91, 1992–93)
- Şampiyonuve 'Kupa Galipleri Kupası', 1999
- 2'nci Sıra 'CEV Kupası', 1993
- 3'üncü yerde 'Şampiyon Kulüpler', 2000

== See also ==
- Turkish women in sports
