= Nilay Konar =

Turkish volleyball player (born 1980)

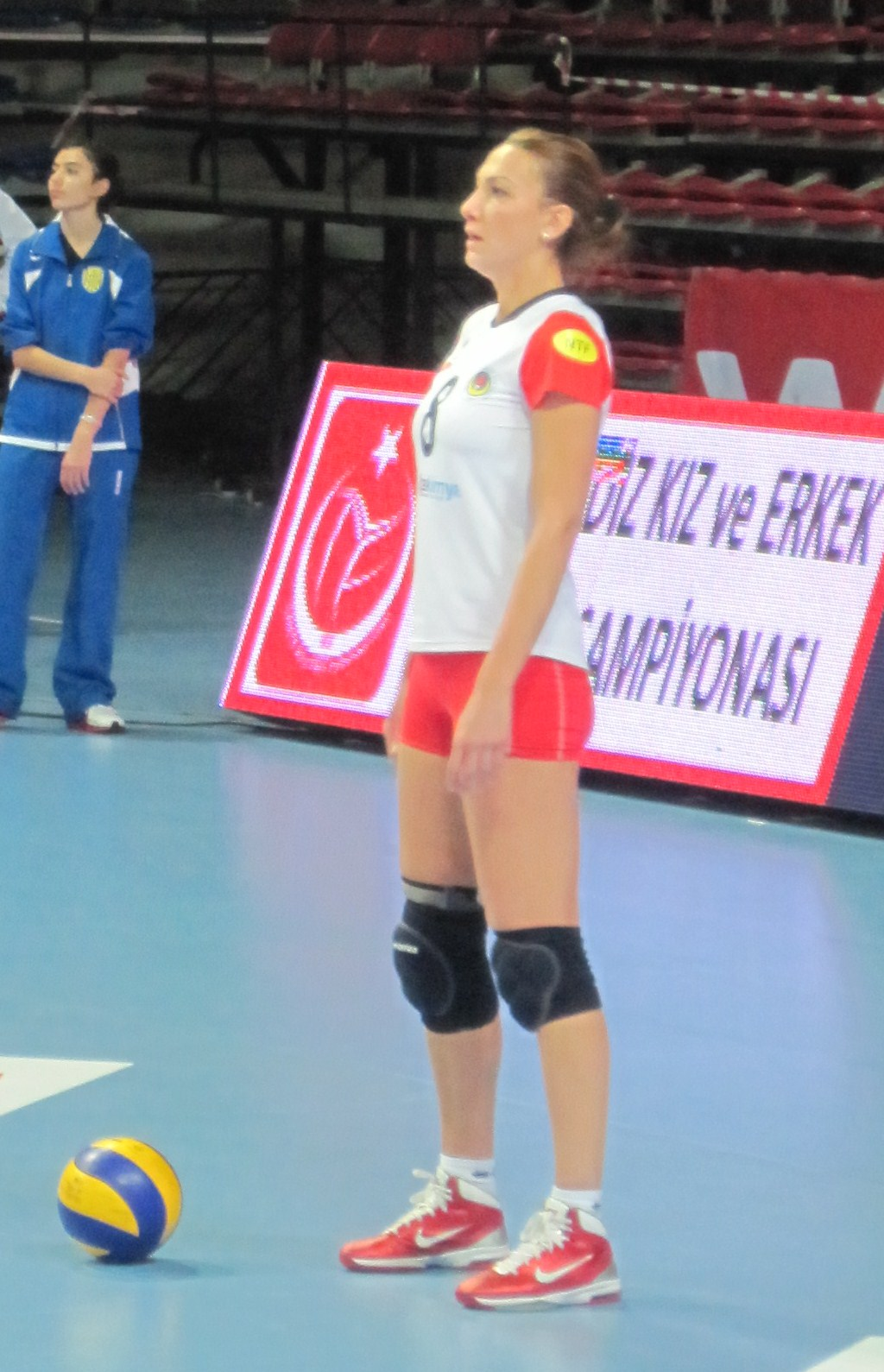

Personal information
- Full name: Nilay Konar
- Born: August 30, 1980 (age 46); Ankara, Turkey
- Height: 1.91 m (6 ft 3 in)

Volleyball information
- Position: Middle Blocker
- Current club: (Turkey) Galatasaray Daikin
- Number: [TBA]

Career
Years	Teams
1998–1999; 1999–2000; 2000–2003; 2004–2005; 2005–2007; 2007–2009; 2009–2010; 2010–2011; 2011–present	Emlakbank; Deniz Nakliyat; Kocaelispor; Türk Telekom; Eczacıbaşı; Türk Telekom; MKE Ankaragücü; TED Kolejliler; Galatasaray

National team
Turkey

Nilay Konar (born August 30, 1980, in Ankara) is a Turkish volleyball player. She is 191 cm and plays as middle blocker. She plays for Galatasaray Medical Park.

== Career ==
- Aroma Women's Volleyball League
  - Winner : 2006, 2007.

== Clubs ==
Club	From	To
Emlakbank Ankara	1998–1999	1998–1999
75.Yıl Deniz Nakliyat	1999–2000	1999–2000
Kocaelispor İzmit	2000–2001	2002–2003
Türk Telekom Avea	2004–2005	2004–2005
Eczacıbaşı	2005–2006	2006–2007
Türk Telekom Ankara	2007–2008	2008–2009
MKE Ankaragücü	2009–2010	2009–2010
TED Ankara Kolejliler	2010–2011	2010–2011
Galatasaray	2011–2012	,

== Awards ==
=== Club ===
- 2011-12 Turkish Cup - Runner-up, with Galatasaray Daikin
- 2011-12 CEV Cup - Runner-up, with Galatasaray Daikin
- 2012 Turkish Volleyball Super Cup - Runner-Up, with Galatasaray Daikin
- 2012-2013 Turkish Women's Volleyball Cup - Bronze Medal with Galatasaray Daikin

== See also ==
- Turkish women in sports
