= Su Zent =

Turkish volleyball player (born 1996)

Personal information
- Full name: Su Zent
- Born: March 25, 1996 (age 30); Istanbul, Turkey
- Height: 1.85 m (6 ft 1 in)
- Weight: 72 kg (159 lb)
- Spike: 306 cm (120 in)
- Block: 299 cm (118 in)

Volleyball information
- Position: Middle-blocker
- Current club: Sarıyer Belediyesi Spor Kulübü

Career
Years
- 2011–2013
- 2013–2014
- 2014–2015
- 2015–2018
- 2018–2019
- 2019–2020
- 2020
- 2020–2021
- 2021–2022
- 2022–
Teams
- TVF Spor Lisesi
- Bolu Bld.
- Bakırköy Belediyesi Yeşilyurt
- Galatasaray
- Türk Hava Yolları
- Beşiktaş
- Kuzeyboru
- PTT Spor
- Galatasaray
- Sarıyer Belediyesi Spor Kulübü

National team
Turkey
Honours
Women's volleyball
Representing Turkey
Islamic Solidarity Games
Silver medal – second place	2017 Baku	Team

Su Zent (born March 25, 1996, in Istanbul, Turkey) is a Turkish volleyball player. She is 185 cm (6.07 ft) tall at 72 kg (159 lb) and plays as middle-blocker. She plays for Sarıyer Belediyesi Spor Kulübü.

== Career ==
On 14 May 2021, she signed a 1-year contract with the Galatasaray Women's Volleyball Team.
