= Nilay Karaağaç =

Turkish volleyball player (born 1985)

Personal information
- Full name: Nilay Özdemir Karaağaç
- Born: October 24, 1985 (age 41); Salihli, Manisa Province, Turkey
- Height: 1.79 m (5 ft 10 1/2 in)
- Weight: 62 kg (137 lb)
- Spike: 236 cm (93 in)
- Block: 231 cm (91 in)

Volleyball information
- Position: Setter

Career
Years
- 2000–2004
- 2005–2007
- 2007–2008
- 2008–2010
- 2010–2012
- 2012–2014
- 2014–2015
- 2015
- 2015–2016
- 2017–2018
- 2019–2022
Teams
- Karşıyaka
- Emlak TOKİ
- Türk Telekom
- Beşiktaş
- VakıfBank
- Fenerbahçe
- Eczacıbaşı VitrA
- Volero Zurich
- Eczacıbaşı VitrA
- Bursa BB
- Galatasaray

National team
Turkey

Nilay Karaağaç (born 24 October 1985 in Salihli, Manisa Province, Turkey, is a Turkish volleyball player. She is 179 cm (5 ft 10 in) tall and plays as setter. She plays for Galatasaray and wears jersey number 11. She played 124 times for the Turkey women's national volleyball team.

== Career ==
Özdemir played with Fenerbahçe in the 2012 FIVB Club World Championship held in Doha, Qatar and helped her team to win the bronze medal after defeating Puerto Rico's Lancheras de Cataño 3-0.

== Clubs ==
- 2000-2004 Karşıyaka
- 2005-2007 Emlak TOKİ
- 2007-2008 Türk Telekom Ankara
- 2008-2010 Beşiktaş JK
- 2010-2012 Vakifbank Türk Telekom
- 2012-2014 Fenerbahçe
- 2014-2015 Eczacıbaşı VitrA
- 2015 Volero Zurich
- 2015-2016 Eczacıbaşı VitrA
- 2017-2018 Bursa Büyükşehir Belediyespor
- 2019-2022 Galatasaray

== Awards ==
=== Clubs ===
- 2012 FIVB Women's Club World Championship – Bronze Medal, with Fenerbahçe
- 2012-13 CEV Cup - Silver Medal, with Fenerbahçe
- 2013-14 CEV Cup - Champion, with Fenerbahçe

=== National team ===
- 2011 European Championship - Bronze
- 2012 FIVB World Grand Prix - Bronze

== See also ==
- Turkish women in sports
