= Neslihan Turan =

Turkish volleyball player (born 1980)

Personal information
- Born: Neslihan Keskin; 29 July 1980 (age 46) Turkey
- Height: 1.80 m (5 ft 11 in)

Coaching information
- Current team: Galatasaray (administrative manager)
- Previous teams coached
- Years: Teams
- 2010–2013 2016–: Galatasaray (team manager); Galatasaray (administrative manager)

Volleyball information
- Position: Outside Hitter

Career
- Years: Team
- 1998–2010: Galatasaray

National team
- Years: Team
- –: Turkey

Neslihan Turan (born July 29, 1980) is a retired Turkish volleyball player.

== Club career ==
During her 20–year career, the volleyball player who only played for Galatasaray was also the team captain.

== Management career ==
In the statement made by Galatasaray on August 2, 2010, it was announced that Turan was appointed as the Women's Volleyball Team Manager.

== Personal life ==
She married Melih Turan and they had a daughter named Lila on April 24, 2015.
