= Fatma Beyaz =

Turkish volleyball player (born 1995)

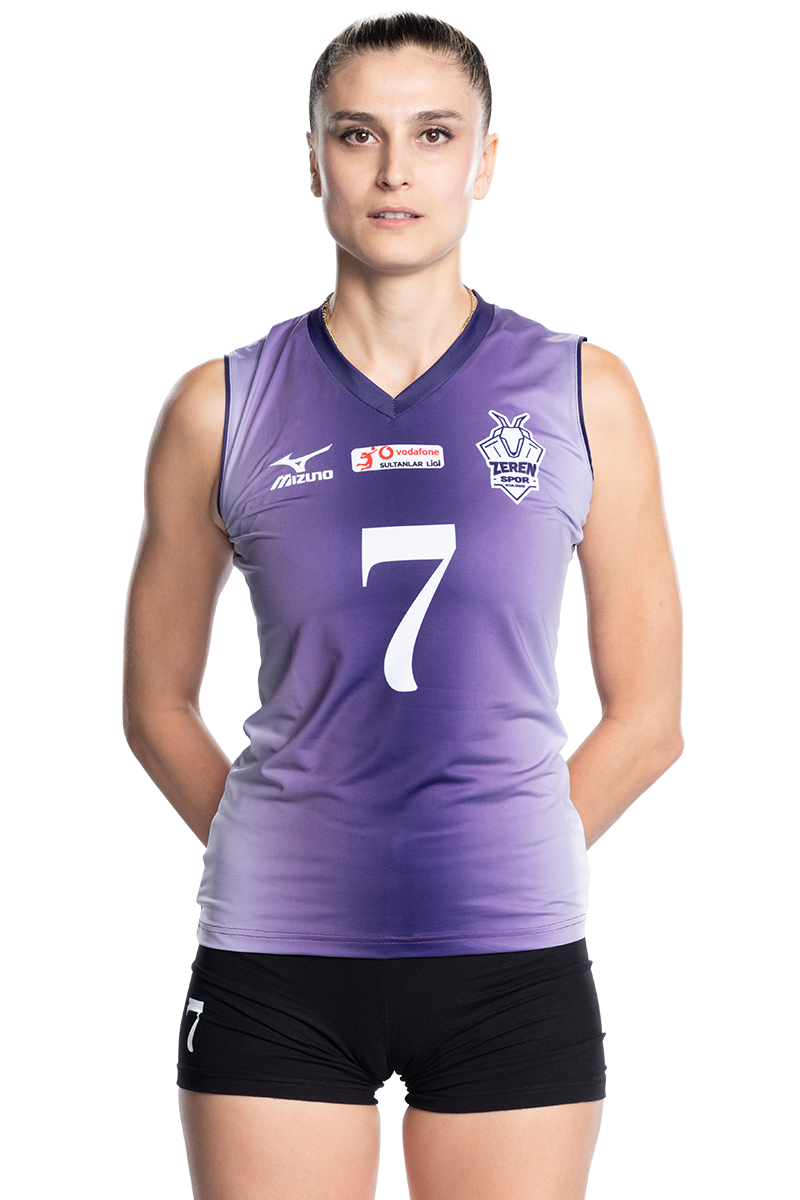
- Beyaz in 2024

Personal information
- Full name: Fatma Beyaz
- Born: April 16, 1995 (age 31); Istanbul, Turkey
- Height: 1.86 m (6 ft 1 in)
- Weight: 68 kg (150 lb)
- Spike: 315 cm (124 in)
- Block: 305 cm (120 in)

Volleyball information
- Position: Middle-blocker
- Current club: Fenerbahçe

Career
Years
- 2016–2017
- 2017–2018
- 2018–2020
- 2020
- 2020–2021
- 2021–2023
- 2023
- 2023–2024
- 2024–2025
- 2025–
Teams
- İdmanocağı SK
- Özateş SK
- Beşiktaş
- Çan Gençlik Kale Spor
- Bolu Belediyespor
- Galatasaray
- Adam Voleybol
- Galatasaray
- Zeren Spor Kulübü
- Fenerbahçe

National team
| Turkey |

Fatma Beyaz (born April 16, 1995 in Istanbul, Turkey) is a Turkish volleyball player. She is 186 cm (6.10 ft) tall at 68 kg (150 lb) and plays in the Middle-blocker position. She plays for Fenerbahçe.

== Career ==
She started her career with Vakıfbank U19 team in the 2012-2013 season, and also wore the jerseys of Salihli Belediyespor, Ordu Türk Telekom, İdmanocağı SK, Özateş SK, Beşiktaş, Çan Gençlik Kale Spor, Bolu Belediyespor, Galatasaray, Adam Voleybol and Zeren Spor Kulübü.

== Honours ==
(Turkey) Fenerbahçe

- Turkish Super Cup: 2025
