= Bihter Dumanoğlu =

Turkish volleyball player (born 1995)

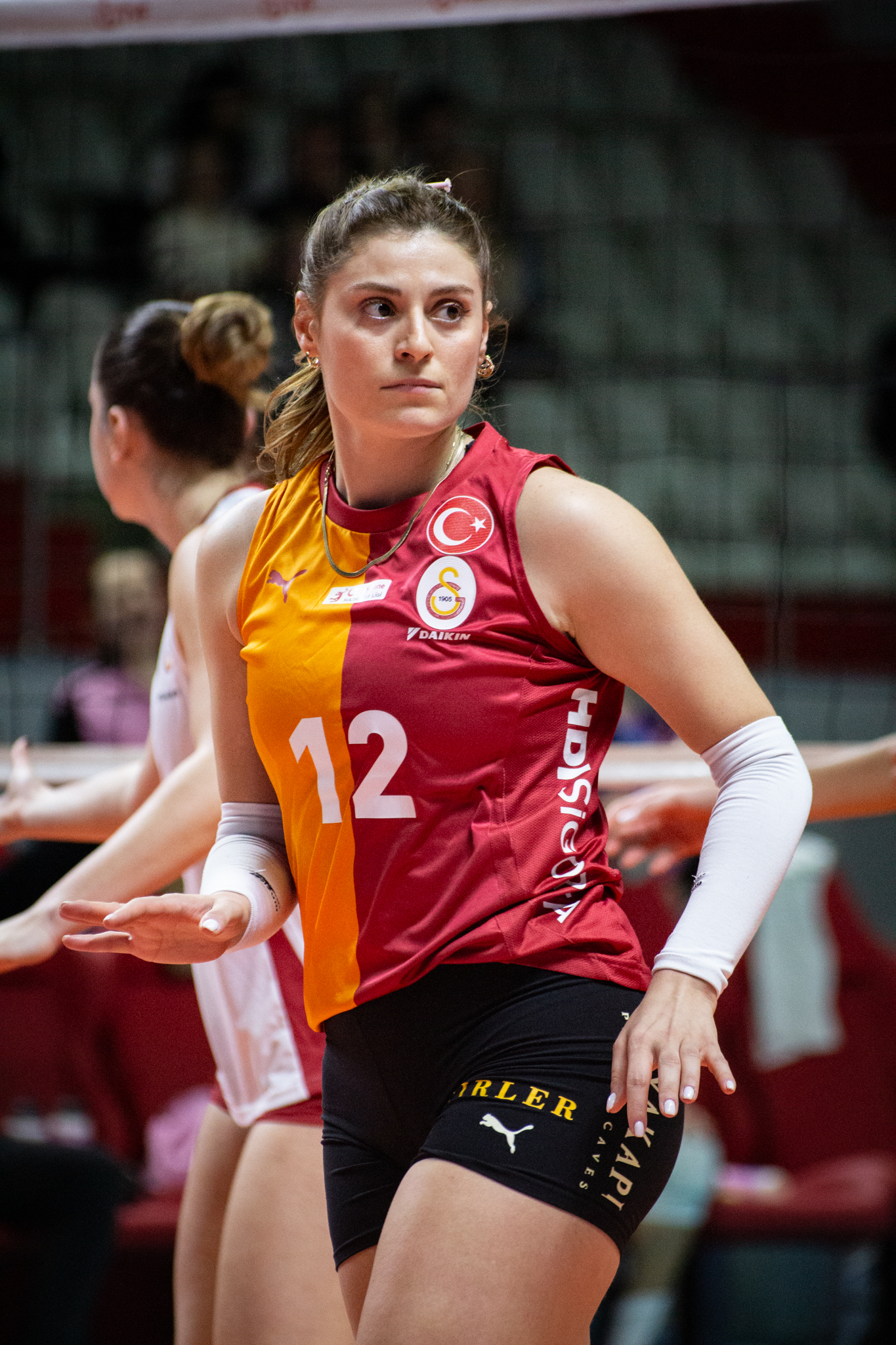

Personal information
- Full name: Bihter Dumanoğlu Yarkın
- Born: February 3, 1995 (age 31); Turkey
- Height: 1.75 m (5 ft 9 in)
- Weight: 68 kg (150 lb)
- Spike: 282 cm (111 in)
- Block: 270 cm (110 in)

Volleyball information
- Position: Libero
- Current club: Papara Göztepe

Career
Years	Teams
2013–2016	Galatasaray
2016–2017	Beşiktaş
2017–2018	Galatasaray
2018–2019	Çanakkale Belediyespor
2019–2020	Aydın Büyükşehir Belediyespor
2020–2021	Sistem9 Yeşilyurt
2021–2025	Galatasaray
2025–	Papara Göztepe

National team
2011-	Turkey
Honours
Women's volleyball
Representing Turkey
Women's European Volleyball League
Gold medal – first place	2014 Germany/Turkey	Team
Islamic Solidarity Games
Silver medal – second place	2017 Baku	Team
Women's U23 World Championship
Gold medal – first place	2017 Ljubljana	Team

Bihter Dumanoğlu (born February 3, 1995) is a Turkish female volleyball player. She is 174 cm (5.71 ft) tall at 68 kg (150 lb) and plays as libero. She is currently with the Papara Göztepe, which competes in the Turkish Women's Volleyball League.

== Career ==
=== Club ===
On 21 April 2021, she signed a 2-year contract with the Galatasaray Women's Volleyball Team.

On 20 June 2023, she signed a new 2-year contract with Galatasaray and remained in the yellow-red team.

=== National team ===
Dumanoğlu is a member of the Turkey women's national volleyball team.

== Awards ==
=== National team ===
- 2014 Women's European Volleyball League - Gold

=== Club ===
- 2011-12 Turkish Cup - Runner-up, with Galatasaray Daikin
- 2011-12 CEV Cup - Runner-up, with Galatasaray Daikin
