= Gamze Alikaya =

Turkish women's volleyball player (born 1993)

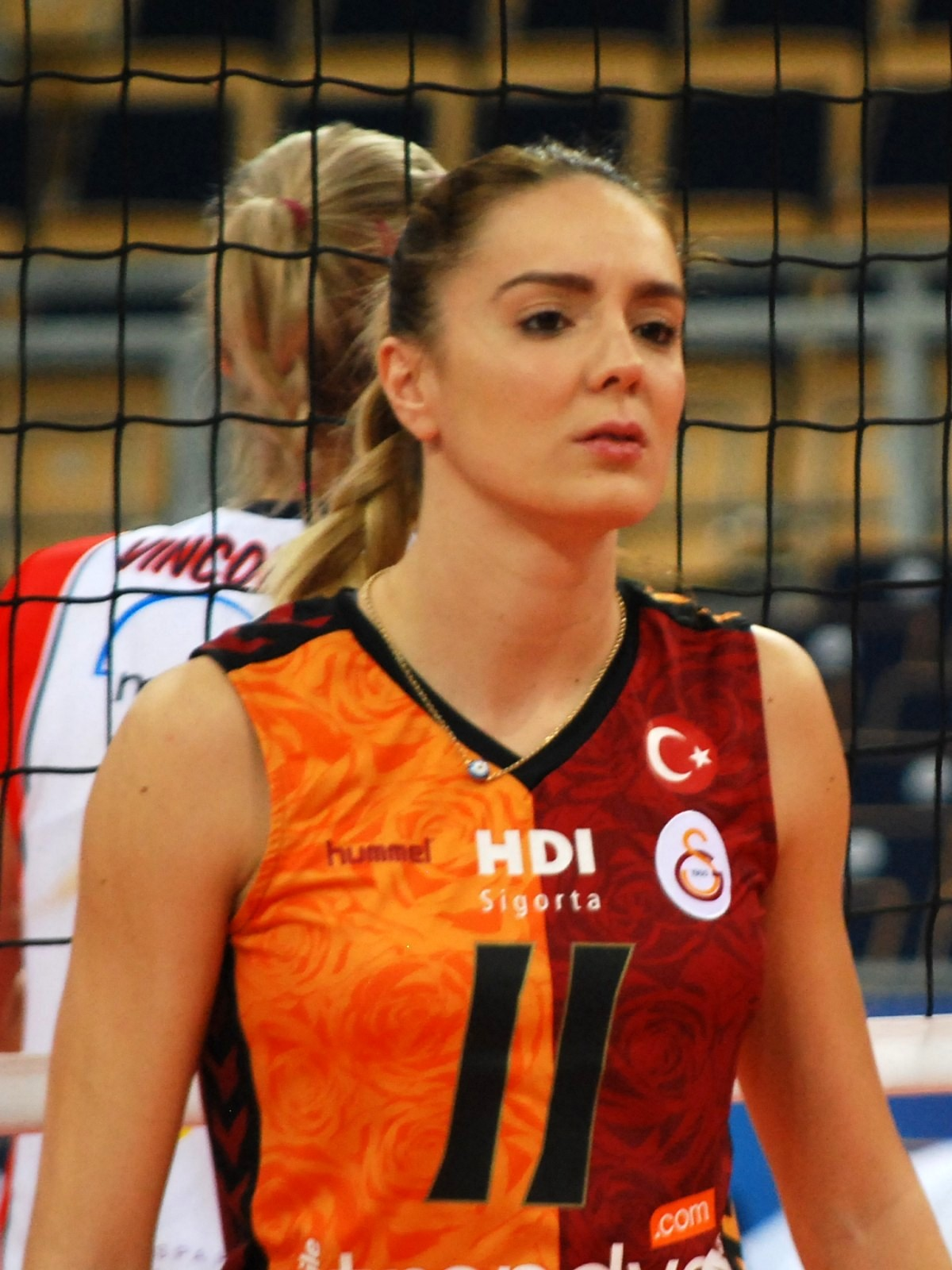
- Gamze Alikaya for Galatasaray S.K. (2017)

Personal information
- Full name: Gamze Kılıç Alikaya
- Born: 1 January 1993 (age 33); Istanbul, Turkey
- Height: 1.79 m (5 ft 10 1/2 in)
- Weight: 68 kg (150 lb)
- Spike: 300 cm (120 in)
- Block: 280 cm (110 in)

Volleyball information
- Position: Setter
- Current club: Kuzeyboru

Career
Years	Teams
2010–2018	Galatasaray
2018–2020	Eczacıbaşı VitrA
2021–2023	Galatasaray
2023–	Kuzeyboru

National team
2008–2009	Turkey youth
2010–2011	Turkey junior
2013–	Turkey
Honours
Women's volleyball
Representing Turkey
FIVB Nations League
Silver medal – second place	2018 Nanjing	Team

Gamze Alikaya (born 1 January 1993) is a Turkish volleyball player. She is 179 cm (5.87 ft) tall at 68 kg (150 lb) and plays in the setter position.

She played for Galatasaray S.K. before she transferred to Eczacıbaşı VitrA for the 2018–19 season. She is a member of the Turkey women's national volleyball team.

== Playing career ==
=== Club ===
By end May 2018, Alikaya moved from her club Galatasaray S.K. to Eczacıbaşı VitrA for the 2018–19 Turkish Women's Volleyball League season.

Between 2012 and 2018, she took part at Women's CEV Cup with Galatasaray S.K.

=== International ===
Alikaya played for the Turkey girls' youth (2008–2009), and the Turkey women's junior teams (22010-2011). She is a member of the Turkey women's national volleyball team, She played at the 2014 World Grand Prix, 2015 European Championship, 2017 World Grand Prix, 2017 European Championship, and currently takes part at the 2018 FIVB Volleyball Women's Nations League for Turkey.
