= Funda Bilgi =

Turkish volleyball player (born 1983)

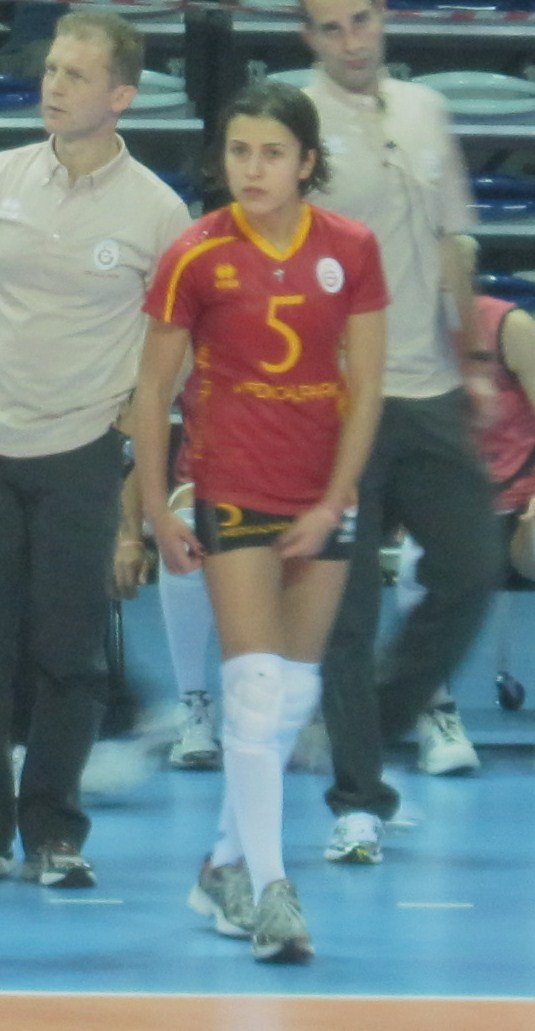

Personal information
- Full name: Funda Bilgi
- Born: June 4, 1983 (age 43); Turkey
- Height: 1.63 m (5 ft 4 in)

Volleyball information
- Position: Libero
- Current club: Galatasaray Medical Park
- Number: 28

Career
Years	Teams
2006; 2007; 2008; 2009; 2010–present	Numune İnterfarma; TED Koleji; Şahinbey Belediyesi; Ankaragücü; Galatasaray Medical Park

National team
Turkey

Funda Bilgi (born June 4, 1983) is a Turkish volleyball player. She is 163 cm and plays as libero. She plays for Galatasaray Medical Park.

== Awards ==
=== Club ===
- 2011-12 Turkish Cup - Runner-up, with Galatasaray Daikin
- 2011-12 CEV Cup - Runner-up, with Galatasaray Daikin

== See also ==
- Turkish women in sports
