= Yeşilyurt women's volleyball team =

Bakırköy Belediyesi Yeşilyurt Women’s Volleyball
- Full name: Bakırköy Belediyesi Yeşilyurt Kadın Voleybol
- Short name: Yeşilyurtspor
- Founded: 1956; 70 years ago
- Ground: Yeşilyurt Arena; Istanbul, Turkey
- Chairman: (Turkey) Levent Gökçe
- Manager: (Turkey) Üzeyir Özdurak
- League: Sultanlar Ligi
- Website: http://www.yesilyurtsporkulubu.org.tr Club home page

Yeşilyurt Women’s Volleyball, now renamed to Bakırköy Belediyesi Yeşilyurt Women’s Volleyball, is the women's volleyball section of Turkish sports club Yeşilyurt S.K. in Istanbul, Turkey. Founded in 1956 in Yeşilyurt neighborhood of Bakırköy district, the club's colors are . The team is playing its home matches at the Yeşilyurt Arena.

== Current squad ==
As of 20 August 2013.

Number	Player	Birth date and age	Position	Height (m)
	(Turkey) Duygu Öztürk	1992 (age 33–34)	Outside hitter	1.81
	(Turkey) Seray Altay	August 28, 1987 (age 38)	Hitter	1.82
	(Turkey) Simge Şebnem Aköz	1991 (age 34–35)	Libero	1.68
	(Turkey) Şule Yetimoğlu	1992 (age 33–34)	Libero	1.68
	(Turkey) Özgenur Yurtdagülen	August 6, 1993 (age 33)	Middle Blocker	1.92
	(Turkey) Tuğçe Hocaoğlu	March 11, 1988 (age 38)	Setter	1.83
	(Turkey) Ceren Kestirengöz	July 19, 1993 (age 33)	Hitter	1.94
	(Turkey) Ceren Çağlar	1992 (age 33–34)	Middle Blocker	1.90
	(Turkey) Merve Tanıl	February 22, 1990 (age 36)	Setter	1.80
	(Turkey) Pınar Motur	1993 (age 32–33)	Middle Blocker	1.83

Head coach: Üzeyir Özdurak

== Former players ==
Azerbaijan

- Oksana Parkhomenko (2000-2001)

Thailand

- Saymai Paladsrichuay (2008-2009)
- Narumon Khanan (2008-2009)

Turkey

- Tülin Altıntaş
- Ergül Avcı
- Pelin Çelik (2001-2003)
- Neslihan Demir Darnel (1998-2002)
- Zeynep Sude Demirel (2020–2021)
- Esra Gümüş (2000-2004)
- Ünzile Nur Hacıoğlu (2022-2024)
- Sude Hacımustafaoğlu (2022-2025)
- Özge Kırdar (2005-2006)
- Bahanur Şahin Gökalp (2004-2006)
- Eylem Şenkal
- Bahar Toksoy (2004-2006)
