= 2012–13 Turkish Women's Volleyball Cup =

2012-2013 Teledünya Turkish Women's Volleyball Cup
- Duration: October 6, 2012 – February 24, 2013
- Date: February 24, 2013
- Finals venue: Başkent Volleyball Hall, Ankara
- Finals champions: Vakıfbank

The 2012–13 Teledünya Turkish Women's Volleyball Cup (Turkish: 2012-2013 Teledünya Türkiye Bayanlar Voleybol Kupası) was the 15th edition of Turkish Women's Volleyball Cup. It was held between October 6, 2012 and February 24, 2013. Vakıfbank won the cup defeating the title defender Eczacıbaşı VitrA with 3-0 in the final, and captured the title for the first time again after 15 years.

== Round 1 ==
24 teams were drawn to 6 pools of 4 teams each. The 1st and 2nd ranked qualified for Round 2. The remaining 3rd placed and all 4th placed teams were eliminated.

=== Group A ===
Pos	Team	Pld	W	L	Pts	SW	SL	SR	SPW	SPL	SPR
1	Beşiktaş Bahçeşehir Üni.	2	2	0	6	6	1	6.000	174	124	1.403
2	Halkbank Gazi Üni.	2	1	1	3	3	4	0.750	158	159	0.994
3	İdman Ocağı	2	0	2	0	1	6	0.167	143	162	0.883

Date	Time		Score		Set 1	Set 2	Set 3	Set 4	Set 5	Total	Report
06 Oct	14:00	Halkbank Gazi Üni.	3–1	İdman Ocağı	25–20	25–23	12–25	25–22		87–90	
07 Oct	14:00	İdman Ocağı	0–3	Beşiktaş Bahçeşehir Üni.	17–25	23–25	13–25			53–75	
08 Oct	14:00	Beşiktaş Bahçeşehir Üni.	3–1	Halkbank Gazi Üni.	24–26	25–10	25–15	25–20		99–71	

=== Group B ===
Pos	Team	Pld	W	L	Pts	SW	SL	SR	SPW	SPL	SPR
1	Ereğli Bld.	2	2	0	5	6	2	3.000	184	121	1.521
2	Karşıyaka	2	1	1	4	5	3	1.667	167	147	1.136
3	Ankaragücü	2	0	2	0	1	6	0.167	67	150	0.447

Date	Time		Score		Set 1	Set 2	Set 3	Set 4	Set 5	Total	Report
06 Oct	14:00	Karşıyaka	3–0	Ankaragücü	25–16	25–11	25–11			75–38	
07 Oct	16:00	Ankaragücü	0–3	Ereğli Bld.	14–25	7–25	8–25			29–75	
08 Oct	14:00	Ereğli Bld.	3–2	Karşıyaka	25–22	23–25	25–13	23–25	15-7	111–85	

=== Group C ===
Pos	Team	Pld	W	L	Pts	SW	SL	SR	SPW	SPL	SPR
1	Sarıyer Bld.	3	3	0	9	9	2	4.500	271	197	1.376
2	Salihli Bld.	3	2	1	6	7	3	2.333	234	204	1.147
3	Çankaya Bld. ANKA	3	1	2	3	3	6	0.500	181	223	0.812
4	Arkasspor	3	0	3	0	1	9	0.111	190	252	0.754

Date	Time		Score		Set 1	Set 2	Set 3	Set 4	Set 5	Total	Report
06 Oct	14:00	Sarıyer Bld.	3–1	Salihli Bld.	24–26	25–19	25–16	25-23		99–61	
06 Oct	16:00	Çankaya Bld. ANKA	3–0	Arkasspor	28–26	27–25	25–22			80–73	
07 Oct	14:00	Salihli Bld.	3–0	Çankaya Bld. ANKA	25–14	25–23	25–12			75–49	
07 Oct	16:00	Arkasspor	1–3	Sarıyer Bld.	8–25	13–25	25–22	15-25		61–72	
08 Oct	14:00	Sarıyer Bld.	3–0	Çankaya Bld. ANKA	25–15	25–20	25–17			75–52	
08 Oct	16:00	Arkasspor	0–3	Salihli Bld.	21–25	21–25	14–25			56–75	

=== Group D ===
Pos	Team	Pld	W	L	Pts	SW	SL	SR	SPW	SPL	SPR
1	Bursa Büyükşehir Bld.	3	3	0	9	9	1	9.000	251	116	2.164
2	Çanakkale Bld.	3	2	1	5	7	5	1.400	270	221	1.222
3	Karayolları	3	1	2	4	5	6	0.833	227	233	0.974
4	Bolu Bld	3	0	3	0	0	9	0.000	113	226	0.500

Date	Time		Score		Set 1	Set 2	Set 3	Set 4	Set 5	Total	Report
06 Oct	14:00	Bursa Büyükşehir Bld.	3–0	Bolu Bld	25–13	25–6	25–12			75–31	
06 Oct	16:00	Karayolları	2–3	Çanakkale Bld.	21–25	25–21	28–26	19-25	4-15	97–72	
07 Oct	14:00	Bolu Bld	0–3	Karayolları	9–25	13–25	24–26			46–76	
07 Oct	16:00	Çanakkale Bld.	1–3	Bursa Büyükşehir Bld.	22–25	21–25	28–26	14-25		85–76	
08 Oct	14:00	Bursa Büyükşehir Bld.	3–0	Karayolları	25–23	25–16	25–15			75–54	
08 Oct	16:00	Çanakkale Bld.	3–0	Bolu Bld	25–14	25–14	25–8			75–36	

== Round 2 ==
The only match played in this round

Date	Time		Score		Set 1	Set 2	Set 3	Set 4	Set 5	Total	Report
28 Nov	14:00	Salihli Bld.	3–0	Halkbank Gazi Üni.	25–12	25–17	25–11			75–40	
28 Nov	16:00	Sarıyer Bld.	1–3	Bursa Büyükşehir Bld.	22–25	25–22	23–25	23-25		93–72	
28 Nov	16:00	VakıfBank	3–0	TED Ankara Kolejliler	25–13	25–17	25–22			75–52	
28 Nov	17:00	İlbank	2–3	Ereğli Bld.	25–23	20–25	20–25	25-21	14-16	104–73	
28 Nov	17:00	Çanakkale Bld.	0–3	Karşıyaka	20–25	19–25	16–25			55–75	
28 Nov	17:00	Bakırköy Bld. Yeşilyurt	3–0	Nilüfer Bld.	25–20	25–23	25–14			75–57	
28 Nov	18:00	Galatasaray Daikin	3–1	Fenerbahçe	25–17	25–22	18–25	25-22		93–64	
29 Nov	16:00	Eczacıbaşı VitrA	3–1	Beşiktaş Bahçeşehir Üni.	25–14	25–22	25–27	25-15		100–63	

== Quarterfinals ==
- All times are local time.
- In case of a tie – 1 match won & 1 match lost and not depending on the final score of both matches – the teams play a Golden Set to determine which one qualified for the Final Round.

=== First leg ===
Date	Time		Score		Set 1	Set 2	Set 3	Set 4	Set 5	Total	Report
17 Dec	15:00	Eczacıbaşı VitrA	3–1	Ereğli Bld.	25–10	22–25	25–18	25-14		97–53	
18 Dec	17:30	VakıfBank	3–0	Bakırköy Bld. Yeşilyurt	25–8	25–15	25–17			75–40	
19 Dec	15:00	Galatasaray Daikin	3–0	Salihli Bld.	25–23	25–21	25–22			75–66	
19 Dec	20:30	Bursa Büyükşehir Bld.	3–0	Karşıyaka	25–20	26–24	25–21			76–65	

=== Second leg ===
Date	Time		Score		Set 1	Set 2	Set 3	Set 4	Set 5	Total	Report
20 Dec	17:00	Ereğli Bld.	1–3	Eczacıbaşı VitrA	24–26	31–33	25–21	17-25		97–80	
03 Feb	14:30	Salihli Bld.	0–3	Galatasaray Daikin	21–25	16–25	13–25			50–75	
03 Feb	17:00	Bakırköy Bld. Yeşilyurt	0–3	VakıfBank	20–25	14–25	8–25			42–75	
03 Feb	18:00	Karşıyaka	^{1}3–2	Bursa Büyükşehir Bld.	22–25	22–25	25–18	25-13	17-15	111–68	111–96

^{1}Karşıyaka won the golden set 15–11

== Finals ==
- Venue: Başkent Volleyball Hall, Ankara, Turkey,

Pos	Team	Pld	W	L	Pts	SW	SL	SR	SPW	SPL	SPR
1	VakıfBank	3	3	0	9	9	1	9.000	248	174	1.425
2	Eczacıbaşı VitrA	3	2	1	6	6	3	2.000	203	184	1.103
3	Galatasaray Daikin	3	1	2	3	4	6	0.667	213	224	0.951
4	Karşıyaka	3	0	3	0	0	9	0.000	144	226	0.637

Date	Time		Score		Set 1	Set 2	Set 3	Set 4	Set 5	Total	Report
22 Feb	13:00	VakıfBank	3–0	Karşıyaka	25–9	25–17	25–17			75–43	
22 Feb	15:00	Eczacıbaşı VitrA	3–0	Galatasaray Daikin	25–21	25–17	25–21			75–59	
23 Feb	13:00	Karşıyaka	0–3	Eczacıbaşı VitrA	16–25	20–25	14–26			50–76	
23 Feb	15:00	Galatasaray Daikin	1–3	VakıfBank	17–25	23–25	25–23	14-25		79–73	
24 Feb	13:00	Galatasaray Daikin	3–0	Karşıyaka	25–19	25–18	25–14			75–51	
24 Feb	15:00	VakıfBank	3–0	Eczacıbaşı VitrA	25–17	25–12	25–23			75–52	
