= Gizem Giraygil =

Turkish volleyball player (born 1986)

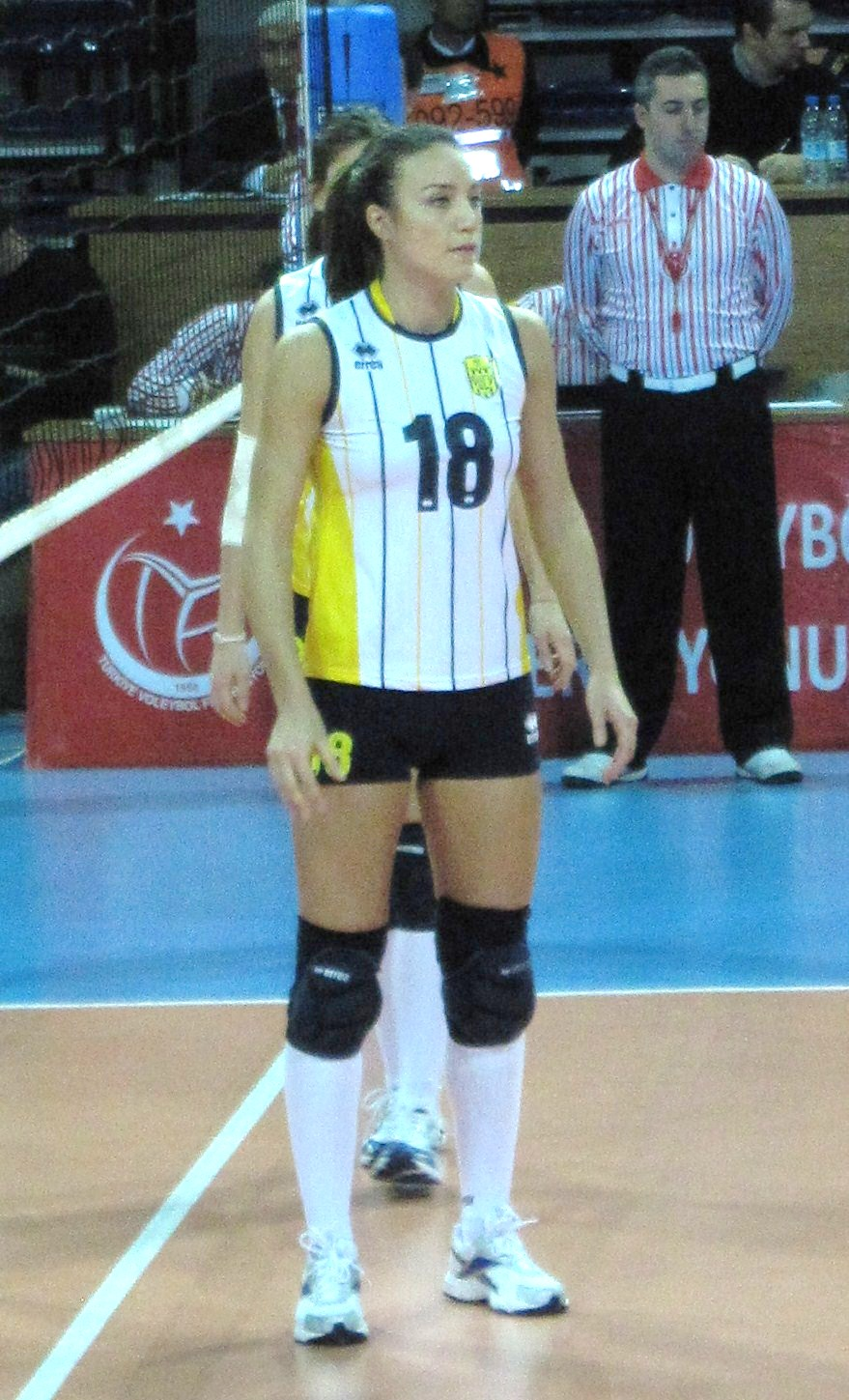
- Gizem Giraygil (February 2011)

Personal information
- Full name: Gizem Giraygil Varol
- Born: May 8, 1986 (age 40); Ankara, Turkey
- Height: 1.80 m (5 ft 11 in)
- Weight: 68 kg (150 lb)
- Spike: 281 cm (111 in)
- Block: 280 cm (110 in)

Coaching information
Previous teams coached
Years	Teams
2018–2024; 2024–2025; 2026–	Türk Hava Yolları (team manager); Eczacıbaşı Dynavit (team manager); Galatasaray (team manager)

Volleyball information
- Position: Setter

Career
Years	Teams
2003–2004	Emlak TOKİ
2004–2006	İlbank
2006–2007	Emlak TOKİ
2007–2008	Fenerbahçe Acıbadem
2008–2009	Gazi Üniversitesi Spor Kulübü
2009–2010	Ereğli Belediye
2010–2012	MKE Ankaragücü
2012	Beşiktaş
2012–2013	Karşıyaka
2013–2014	Lokomotiv Baku
2014	İdmanocağı
2014–2015	Nilüfer Belediyespor
2015–2016	İdmanocağı
2016–2017	Beşiktaş
2017–2018	Türk Hava Yolları

National team
Turkey

Gizem Giraygil (born May 8, 1986) is a Turkish retired volleyball player.

== Personal life ==
Gizem Giraygil was born to Ömer Giraygil in Ankara on May 8, 1986. She spent her early years in a sport environment due to her father's post as the manager of the Selim Sırrı Tarcan Sport Hall. Supported by her parents, she began with volleyball playing at the age of eleven.

She was educated in Political Science at Çankaya University in Ankara.

== Club career ==
After playing for Vakıfbank Güneş Sigorta, İller Bankası, Toki, Fenerbahçe and Ereğli Belediye, she transferred to Ankaragücü.

End January 2012, she left Ankaragücü, however, due to the club's financial problems, and signed for Beşiktaş in Istanbul. In August 2012, she transferred to the İzmir-based club Karşıyaka. In July 2013, she moved to the Azeri club Lokomotiv Baku.

== Management career ==
On July 15, 2026, she was appointed Team Manager of the Galatasaray Daikin Women's Volleyball Team.
