= Beşiktaş JK (women's volleyball) =

Women's volleyball team in Istanbul

Beşiktaş
- Full name: Beşiktaş Women's Volleyball Team
- Short name: Beşiktaş
- Founded: 1961
- Ground: BJK Akatlar Arena; Istanbul, Turkey (Capacity: 3,200)
- Chairman: Serdal Adalı
- Manager: Lorenzo Micelli
- Captain: Buket Gülübay
- League: Sultanlar Ligi
- 2024–25: 10th
- Website: Club home page
- Championships: 1 Turkish Championship

Uniforms
Home	Away

Beşiktaş Women’s Volleyball is the women's volleyball section of Turkish sports club Beşiktaş J.K. in Istanbul, Turkey. The club plays its home matches in BJK Akatlar Arena.

== 2026-27 Team Roster ==
Number	Player	Position	Height (m)
1	(Turkey) Simay Kurt	Libero	1.73
3	(Turkey) Burcu Yönder	Setter	1.85
5	(Turkey) Merve Atlıer	Middle Blocker	1.91
6	(Turkey) Özge Nur Çetiner	Middle Blocker	1.93
7	(Turkey) Buket Gülübay (C)	Setter	1.84
8	(France) Iman Ndiaye	Opposite Hitter	1.88
9	(Turkey) Emine Arıcı	Middle Blocker	1.92
10	(Netherlands) Jolien Knollema	Outside Hitter	1.88
11	(Russia) Polina Shemanova	Outside Hitter	1.83
17	(Turkey) Ece Eke	Middle Blocker	1.93
18	(Algeria) Yasmine Abderrahim	Outside Hitter	1.82
19	(Ukraine) Anna Artyshuk	Opposite Hitter	1.94
34	(United States) Katelyn Evans	Outside Hitter	1.87
	(Turkey) Sude Kale	Libero	

== Honours ==
=== National competitions ===
- Turkish Women's Volleyball League
  - Runners-up (3): 1995-96, 1996-97, 2003-04
- Turkish Women's Volleyball Championship
  - Champions (1): 1964-65

=== International competitions ===
- CEV Women's Challenge Cup
  - Runners-up (1): 2013-14
- BVA Cup
  - Champions (5): 2008, 2009, 2013, 2014, 2018

== Past rosters ==
2025–26

Julia Szczurowska, Diana Meliushkyna, Selin Adalı, Ceren Karagöl, Yasemin Özel, Buket Gülübay, Ceren Nur Domaç, Angela Leyva, İdil Naz Başcan, Buse Kayacan Sonsırma, Zeynep Sude Demirel, Cansu Aydınoğulları, Kadi Kullerkann, Margarita Kurilo

2024–25

Hümay Fırıncıoğlu, Jovana Brakočević, Gizem Güreşen, Julia Szczurowska, Alara Altundağ, Saliha Şahin, Olivia Różański, Merve Tanıl, Derya Güç, Dilay Özdemir, Begüm Kaçmaz, Bengisu Aygün, Merve Nezir, Emily Maglio, Sude Gümüş, Beliz Başkır

2023–24

Duru Aksu, Jovana Brakočević, Gizem Güreşen, Ecem Aknam, Pelin Eroktay, Hilal Kocakara, Çağla Akın, Victoria Demidova, Wilma Salas, İdil Naz Başcan, Bahar Toksoy Guidetti, Sude Naz Uzun, Bengisu Aygün, Celeste Plak, Emily Maglio

2013–14

Zeynep Seda Uslu, Seda Türkkan, Natalia Hanikoğlu, Marina Tumas, Dilek Kınık, Ayça Naz İhtiyaroğlu, Naz Döner, Dicle Nur Babat, Nilay Konar, Gabriela Koeva, Tülin Altıntaş, Selime İlyasoğlu, Paula Yamila Nizetich, Ceyda Aktaş

2012–13

Çağla Akın, Zeynep Seda Uslu, Natalia Hanikoğlu, Ana Lazarević, Funda Bilgi, Tülin Altıntaş, Fatma Sinem Karamuk, Dicle Nur Babat, Tuğba Toprak, Gabriela Koeva, Yağmur Koçyiğit, Aslı Köprülü, Ece Hocaoğlu, Tereza Rossi Matuszkova (Koç: Adnan Kıstak)

2011–12

Maiko Kano, Tanya Sabkova, Olena Gashuka Samsonova, Zülfiye Gündoğdu, Tuğçe Ergenç, Özlem Özçelik, Gülşah Olcay, Duygu Sipahioğlu, Yeliz Askan, Cansu Aydınoğulları, Pınar Eren, Sinem Barut, Hilal Yabuz, Gizem Giraygil (Koç: Bülent Karslıoğlu)

2010–11

Banu Toktamış, Cansu Aydınoğulları, Duygu Sipahioğlu, Gizem Sancak, Gülbahar Akgül, Gülşah Olcay, Hilal Yabuz, Müge Şakar, Natalia Kulikova, Olesia Rykhliuk, Olga Savenchuk, Pelin Çelik, Pınar Eren, Sinem Barut, Yeliz Askan (Coach: Bülent Karslıoğlu)

2009–10

Cansu Aydınoğulları, Duygu Sipahioğlu, Gizem Sancak, Hilal Yabuz, Jasna Majstorović, Melis Gürkaynak, Melis Şahin, Müge Şakar, Nilay Özdemir, Pınar Eren, Sanja Popović, Zeynep Seda Uslu, Tatiana Dos Santos, Yağmur Koçyiğit, Yeliz Askan (Coach: Bülent Karslıoğlu)

== Notable players ==
Bulgaria

- Gabriela Koeva

Czech Republic

- Tereze Rossi Matuszkova

Croatia

- Sanja Popović

Japan

- Maiko Kano

Germany

- Atika Bouagaa

Serbia

- Mirela Delić
- Ana Lazarević

Turkey

- Pelin Çelik
- Cansu Çetin
- Zeynep Sude Demirel
- Ceren Nur Domaç
- Zehra Güneş
- Eda Erdem
- Arzu Göllü
- Natalia Hanikoğlu (Russia)
- Begüm Kaçmaz
- Büşra Kılıçlı
- Yağmur Koçyiğit
- İpek Soroğlu
- Özlem Özçelik
- Zeynep Seda Uslu
- Çağla Akın
- Ece Hocaoğlu

United States

- Kim Oden
