= 2010 FIVB Women's Club World Championship squads =

This article shows all participating team squads at the 2010 FIVB Women's Club World Championship, held from December 15 to 21, 2010 in Doha, Qatar.

== Volley Bergamo ==
- Head Coach: (Italy) Davide Mazzanti

Number	Player	Position	(m)	Birth date
1	(Italy) Serena Ortolani	Opposite	1.87	07/01/1987
2	(Romania) Iuliana Nucu	Middle blocker	1.86	04/10/1980
3	(Italy) Noemi Signorile	Setter	1.83	15/02/1990
4	(Italy) Sara Alberti	Wing spiker	1.85	03/01/1993
5	(Italy) Caterina Fanzini	Wing spiker	1.86	12/08/1985
6	(Italy) Sara Carrara	Libero	1.68	01/12/1991
7	(Italy) Gloria Baldi	Wing spiker	1.87	31/05/1993
8	(Italy) Enrica Merlo	Libero	1.70	28/12/1988
9	(Italy) Lucia Bosetti	Wing spiker	1.75	09/07/1989
10	(Italy) Angela Gabbiadini	Wing spiker	1.80	12/05/1992
11	(Italy) Michela Gallizioli	Wing spiker	1.86	06/07/1993
12	(Italy) Francesca Piccinini	Wing spiker	1.85	10/01/1979
13	(Italy) Valentina Arrighetti	Middle blocker	1.89	26/01/1985
14	(Italy) Eleonora Lo Bianco	Setter	1.72	22/12/1979
15	(Italy) Francesca Rota	Wing spiker	1.85	06/01/1994
16	(Bulgaria) Elitsa Vasileva	Wing spiker	1.94	13/05/1990
17	(Italy) Andrea Sangalli	Wing spiker	1.75	04/03/1993
18	(Italy) Marina Zambelli	Middle blocker	1.87	01/01/1990

== Federbrau ==
- Head Coach: (Thailand) Kiattipong Radchatagriengkai
- Assistant coach: (Thailand) Nataphon Srisamutnak

Number	Player	Position
1	(Thailand) Piyanut Pannoy	Libero
2	(Thailand) Tapaphaipun Chaisri	Libero
3	(Thailand) Rasamee Supamool	Wing spiker
4	(Thailand) Hattaya Bamrungsuk	Middle blocker
5	(Thailand) Pleumjit Thinkaow	Middle blocker
6	(Thailand) Onuma Sittirak	Opposite
7	(Thailand) Patcharee Deesamer	Middle blocker
8	(Thailand) Utaiwan Kaensing	Middle blocker
9	(Thailand) Jurairat Ponleka	Setter
10	(Thailand) Wilavan Apinyapong	Wing spiker
11	(Thailand) Amporn Hyapha	Middle blocker
12	(Thailand) Kamonporn Sukmak	Setter
13	(Thailand) Nootsara Tomkom	Setter
14	(Thailand) Sutadta Chuewulim	Middle blocker
15	(Thailand) Malika Kanthong	Wing spiker
16	(Thailand) Sontaya Keawbundit	Wing spiker
17	(Thailand) Wanitchaya Luangtonglang	Wing spiker
18	(Thailand) Em-orn Phanusit	Wing spiker

== Fenerbahçe Acıbadem ==
- Coach: (Brazil) Zé Roberto

Number	Player	Position	Height (m)
1	(Poland) Katarzyna Skowrońska	Opposite	1.88
3	(Turkey) Nihan Yeldan Güneyligil	Libero	1.72
4	(Turkey) Songül Dikmen	Libero	1.73
5	(Russia) Lioubov Sokolova	Opposite-outside hitter	1.93
6	(Turkey) Ergül Avcı	Middle blocker	1.90
7	(Brazil) Fofão	Setter	1.73
8	(Turkey) İpek Soroğlu	Middle blocker	1.94
9	(Turkey) Seda Tokatlıoğlu (3rd C)	Opposite-outside hitter	1.92
10	(Turkey) Yağmur Koçyiğit	Outside hitter	1.85
11	(Germany) Christiane Fürst	Middle blocker	1.92
12	(Turkey) Çiğdem Can Rasna (C)	Middle blocker	1.84
13	(Croatia) Nataša Osmokrović (2nd C)	Outside hitter	1.84
14	(Turkey) Eda Erdem	Middle blocker	1.87
15	(Turkey) Zülfiye Gündoğdu	Setter	1.78
17	(Turkey) Naz Aydemir	Setter	1.86

== Mirador ==
- Head Coach: (Brazil) Marcos Kwiek

Number	Player	Position
1	(Dominican Republic) Annerys Vargas	Middle blocker
2	(Dominican Republic) Brayelin Martínez	Wing spiker
3	(Dominican Republic) Gabriela Reyes	Setter
4	(Dominican Republic) Yeniffer Ramírez	Wing spiker
5	(Dominican Republic) Brenda Castillo	Libero
6	(Dominican Republic) Carmen Rosa Caso	Libero
7	(Dominican Republic) Niverka Marte	Setter
8	(Dominican Republic) Cándida Arias	Middle blocker
9	(Dominican Republic) Sidarka Núñez	Opposite
10	(Dominican Republic) Milagros Cabral	Wing spiker
11	(Dominican Republic) Yonkaira Peña	Wing spiker
12	(Dominican Republic) Karla Echenique	Setter
13	(Dominican Republic) Cindy Rondón	Opposite
15	(Dominican Republic) Marifranchi Rodríguez	Middle blocker
16	(Dominican Republic) Marisol Concepción	Wing spiker
18	(Dominican Republic) Bethania de la Cruz	Wing spiker
19	(Dominican Republic) Ana Yorkira Binet	Wing spiker
