= Jaline Prado =

Brazilian volleyball player

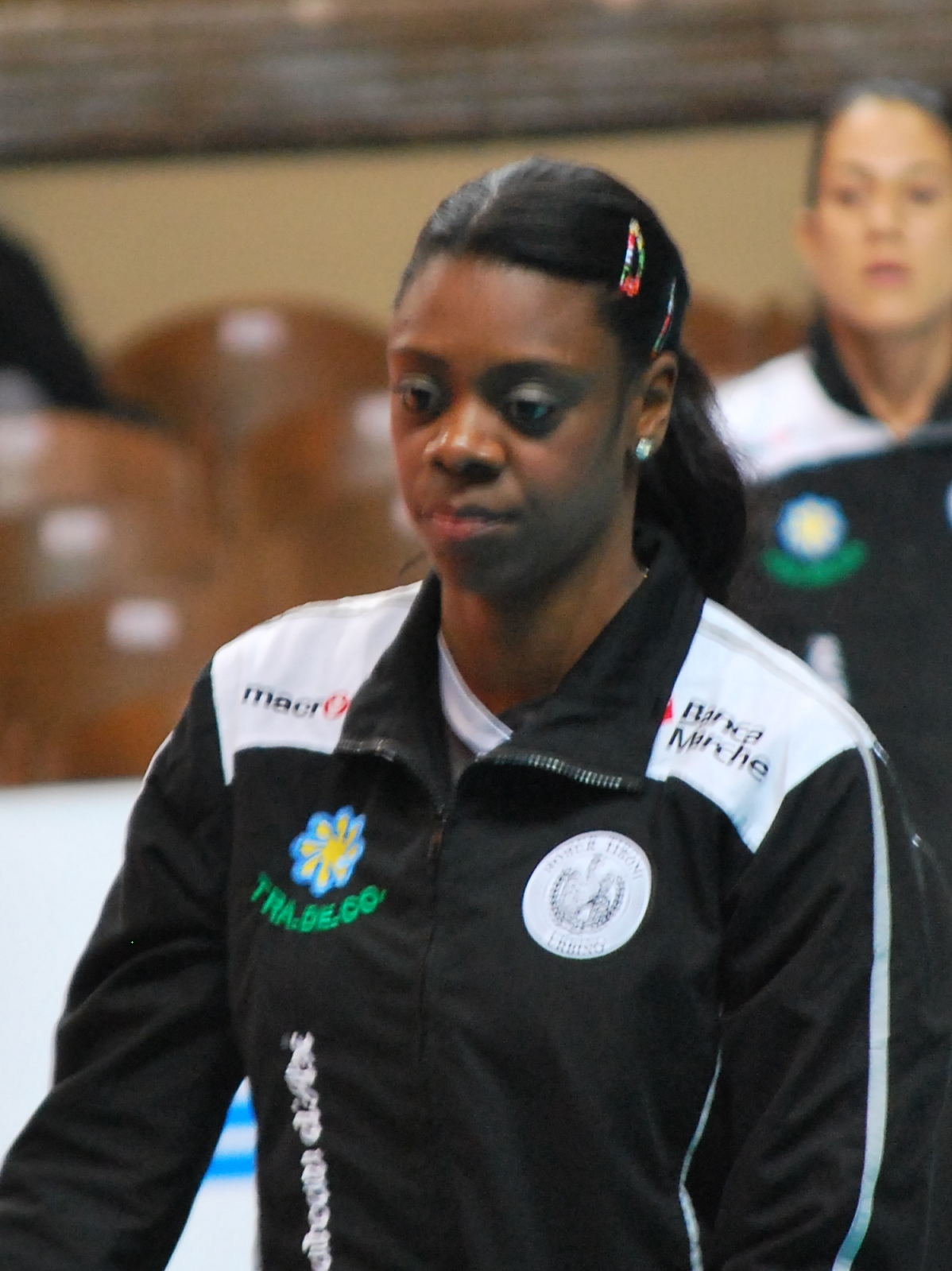

Personal information
- Born: 27 December 1979 (age 46); Campos

Volleyball information
- Current club: Amiens LMVB
- Number: 9

Jaline Prado de Oliveira (born 27 December 1979, Campos) is a Brazilian volleyball player who played in the European Women's Volleyball Leagues.

== Playing career ==
She participated at the 2011–12 Women's CEV Cup, with Chateau d'Ax Urbino.

== Clubs ==
| Club | From | To |
|---|---|---|
| BRA Tietê Volei Clube | 1996-1997 | 1996-1997 |
| BRA São Bernardo | 1997-1997 | 1997-1997 |
| BRA Universidade de Guarulhos | 1998-1998 | 1998-1998 |
| BRA- Macaé Sports | 1999-2000 | 1999-2000 |
| BRA Vasco da Gama | 2000-2001 | 2000-2001 |
| BRA Automóvel Clube Fluminense | 2001-2002 | 2003-2004 |
| BRA CR Flamengo | 2005-2006 | 2005-2006 |
| ITA Minerva Volley Pavia | 2006-2007 | 2006-2007 |
| ITA Volley San Vito | 2007-2008 | 2008-2009 |
| ITA Roma Pallavolo | 2009-2010 | 2009-2010 |
| ITA Tiboni Urbino | 2010-2011 | 2010-2011 |
| ITA AS Rota Volley | 2011-2012 | 2011-2012 |
| ITA Minerva Volley Pavia | 2012-2012 | 2012-2012 |
| ITA Volley Soverato | 2012-2013 | 2012-2013 |
| TUR Ereğli Belediye | sept 2013 | sept 2013 |
| GRE AO Markopoulo | 2014-2015 | 2014-2015 |
| SLO OK Gorica | 2015-2016 | 2015-2016 |
| FRA Amiens LMVB | 2016-2017 | … |
