= Hülya Cömert =

Turkish volleyball player

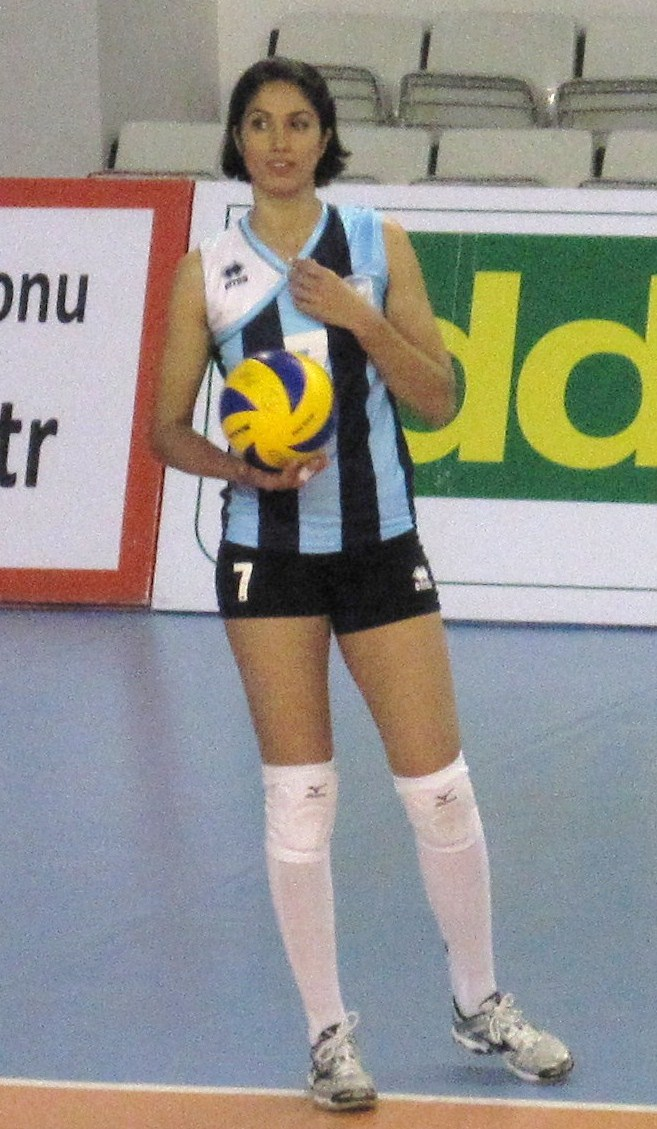

Personal information
- Nationality: Turkish
- Born: January 8, 1980 (age 46); Ankara
- Height: 1.88 m (6 ft 2 in)
- Weight: 72 kg (159 lb)

Volleyball information
- Position: Middle blocker

Career
Years	Teams
1998-2000; 2000-2001; 2002-2006; 2006-2007; 2007-2008; 2008-2009; 2009-2011; 2011-2012	(Turkey) VakıfBank S.K. (Turkey) Deniz Nakliyat (Turkey) İller Bankası Ankara (Turkey) Beşiktaş JK (Turkey) Marmaris Belediye GSK (Turkey) Ereğli Belediyespor (Turkey) Pursaklar Belediyesi (Turkey) Çankaya Belediye

Hülya Cömert (born January 8, 1980) is a Turkish volleyball player.

== Sporting achievements ==
=== Clubs ===
CEV Champions League:

- 1999

Turkish Championship:

- 1999, 2000
- 2003

CEV Cup:

- 2000
