= Sabriye =

Sabriye is a feminine Turkish given name. Notable people with the name include:

- Sabriye Gönülkırmaz (born 1994), Turkish volleyball player
- Sabriye Şengül (born 1988), Turkish boxer, kickboxer and mixed martial artist
- Sabriye Tenberken (born 1970), German blind social worker of Turkish origin
