= İller Bankası women's volleyball =

İller Bankası Women's Volleyball
- Short name: İlbank
- Founded: 1995
- Ground: Selim Sırrı Tarcan Sport Hall; Ankara, Turkey
- Chairman: Tuncay Karaman
- Manager: (Turkey) Burhan Canpolat
- League: Sultanlar Ligi
- Website: Club home page

Uniforms
Home	Away

İller Bankası Women's Volleyball ( Turkish: İlbank Kadın Voleybol Takımı), shortly İlbank, is a women's volleyball team of İller Bankası Youth and Sports Club in Ankara, Turkey, sponsored by the Turkish state-owned bank of İller Bankası. Founded in 1995, the club's colors are blue and gold. The team is playing its home matches at the Selim Sırrı Tarcan Sport Hall.

The club's president is Tuncay Karaman. The women's volleyball team is coached by Burhan Canpolat. The team plays in the Turkish Women's Volleyball League in the 2012–13 season.

== International success ==
- BVA Cup:
  - Winners (2): 2012, 2014
  - Runners-up (1): 2010

== Current squad ==
2012-13 season

Number	Player	Position	Height (m)
1	(Belarus) Marina Tumas	Hitter	1.94
2	(Turkey) Lila Toner	Hitter	1.86
4	(Turkey) Ferda Bulut	Hitter	1.85
5	(Turkey) Tuğçe Atıcı	Setter	1.84
6	(Turkey) Selin Toy	Middle Blocker	1.90
7	(Turkey) Ebru Mandacı	Middle Blocker	1.87
8	(Turkey) Gamze Ergin	Middle Blocker	1.88
9	(Turkey) Ebru Ceylan	Libero	1.83
10	(Russia) Alica Szekelyova	Setter	1.85
11	(Turkey) Ezgi Dağdelenler	Hitter	1.87
13	(Turkey) Elif Uzun	Hitter	1.87
14	(Kazakhstan) Alessya Safronova	Middle Blocker	1.87
15	(Turkey) Bahanur Şahin	Libero	1.78
16	(Turkey) Seval Yılmaz	Libero	1.75

== Notable players ==
{ Belarus

- Marina Tumas

Dominican Republic

- Gina Mambru

Kazakhstan

- Alessya Safronova

Russia

- Alica Szekelyova

Serbia

- Jovana Kocić

Trinidad and Tobago

- Sinead Jack

Turkey

- Dilara Bağcı
- Meryem Boz
- Hülya Cömert
- Songül Dikmen
- Gizem Giraygil
- Zülfiye Gündoğdu
- Begüm Kaçmaz
- Seda Tokatlıoğlu
- Bahanur Şahin Gökalp
