= Damla Çakıroğlu =

Turkish volleyball player (born 1994)

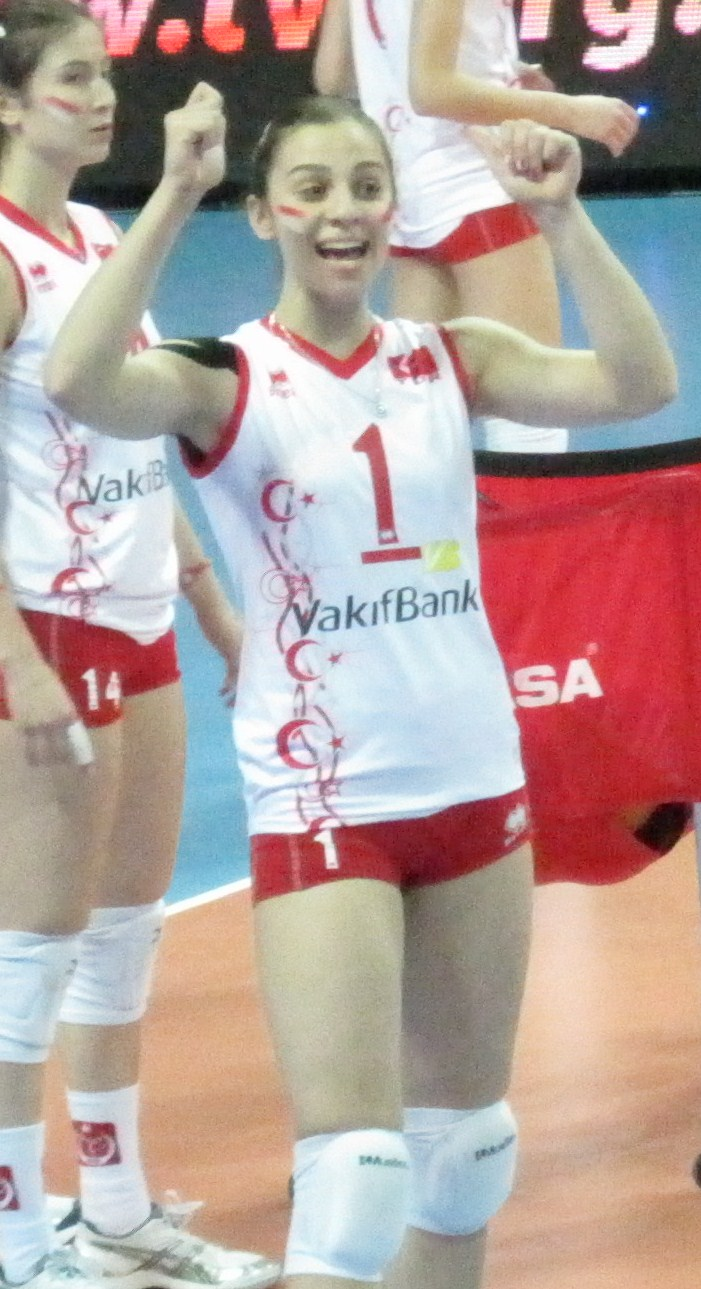

Personal information
- Born: June 22, 1994 (age 32)
- Height: 1.79 m (5 ft 10 in)
- Weight: 69 kg (152 lb)
- Spike: 302 cm (119 in)
- Block: 293 cm (115 in)

Volleyball information
- Current club: Fenerbahçe
- Number: 1

National team
- 2011
- 2012-present
- (Turkey) Girls' youth
- (Turkey) Women's junior
Honours
Women's volleyball
Representing Turkey
Women's Junior European Championship
Gold medal – first place	2012 Ankara	Team
Girls Youth World Championship
Gold medal – first place	2011 Ankara	Team
European Youth Olympic Festival
Bronze medal – third place	2011 Trabzon	Team

Damla Çakıroğlu (born June 22, 1994) is a Turkish female volleyball player. She is 179 cm (5.87 ft) and was the captain of the girls' youth national team and the women's junior national team. She played for TVF Fine Arts and Sports High School in Ankara. She wears number 1.

Damla is the daughter of Melih Çakıroğlu, former coach of the Türk Telekom Basketball Club.

== Clubs ==
- TVF Güzel Sanatlar ve Spor Lisesi (Turkish Volleyball Federation Fine Arts and Sport High School), Ankara.
- In the 2011-12 season, she transferred to İBA TED Ankara Kolejliler, which plays in the Turkish Women's Volleyball League.

== Awards ==
=== Individual ===
- 2011 FIVB Girls Youth World Championship - Most Valuable Player
- 2011 FIVB Girls Youth World Championship - Best server
- 2012 Women's Junior European Volleyball Championship - Most Valuable Player

=== National team ===
- 2011 European Youth Summer Olympic Festival - Bronze
- 2011 FIVB Girls Youth World Championship - Gold
- 2012 Women's Junior European Volleyball Championship - Gold
- 2015 Women's European Volleyball League – Silver

== See also ==
- Turkish women in sports
