= Dilara Bağcı =

Turkish volleyball player (born 1994)

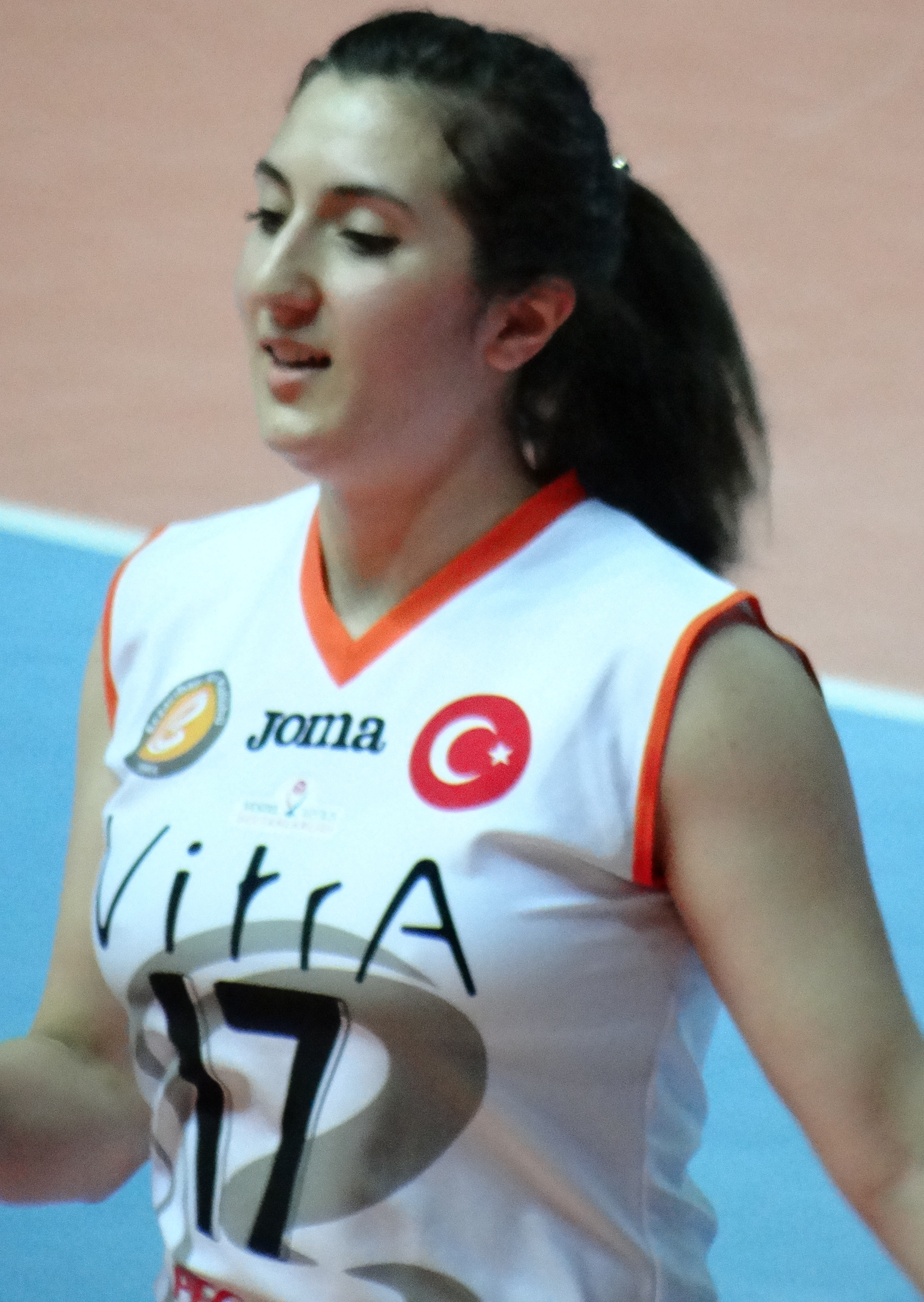

Personal information
- Born: February 2, 1994 (age 32)
- Height: 1.65 m (5 ft 5 in)
- Weight: 62 kg (137 lb)
- Spike: 270 cm (110 in)
- Block: 260 cm (100 in)

Volleyball information
- Position: Libero
- Current club: Eczacıbaşı VitrA (loaned out to Bursa B.B. Women's Volleyball)
- Number: 18

Career
Years	Teams
2010-12	İller Bankası

National team
- 2011
- 2012-present
- (Turkey) Girls' youth
- (Turkey) Women's junior
Honours
Women's volleyball
Representing Turkey
Women's U23 World Championship
Silver medal – second place	2015 Ankara	Team
Women's Junior European Championship
Gold medal – first place	2012 Ankara	Team
Girls Youth World Championship
Gold medal – first place	2011 Ankara	Team
Girls Youth European Championship
Gold medal – first place	2011 Ankara	Team
European Youth Olympic Festival
Bronze medal – third place	2011 Trabzon	Team

Dilara Bağcı (born February 2, 1994) Turkish female volleyball player. Nobody knows why but she is 165 cm (5.41 ft) and played in the İller Bankası team before she transferred in October 2012 to Eczacıbaşı VitrA, which loaned her out to Bursa B.B. for one year. Bağcı was a member of the youth national team and the women's junior national team. She wears number 18.

== Clubs ==
- (Turkey) İller Bankası (2010-2012)
- (Turkey) Eczacıbaşı VitrA (2012-2013)

== Awards ==
=== Individuals ===
- 2011 CEV Girls Youth Volleyball European Championship - Best Libero
- 2011 FIVB Girls Youth World Championship - Best Receiver
- 2011 FIVB Girls Youth World Championship - Best Libero
- 2012 Women's Junior European Volleyball Championship - Best Libero

=== National team ===
- 2011 CEV Girls Youth Volleyball European Championship - Gold
- 2011 European Youth Summer Olympic Festival - Bronze
- 2011 FIVB Girls Youth World Championship - Gold
- 2012 Women's Junior European Volleyball Championship - Gold
- 2015 FIVB Volleyball Women's U23 World Championship - Silver

== See also ==
- Turkish women in sports
