= Sinem Barut =

Turkish volleyball player (born 1986)

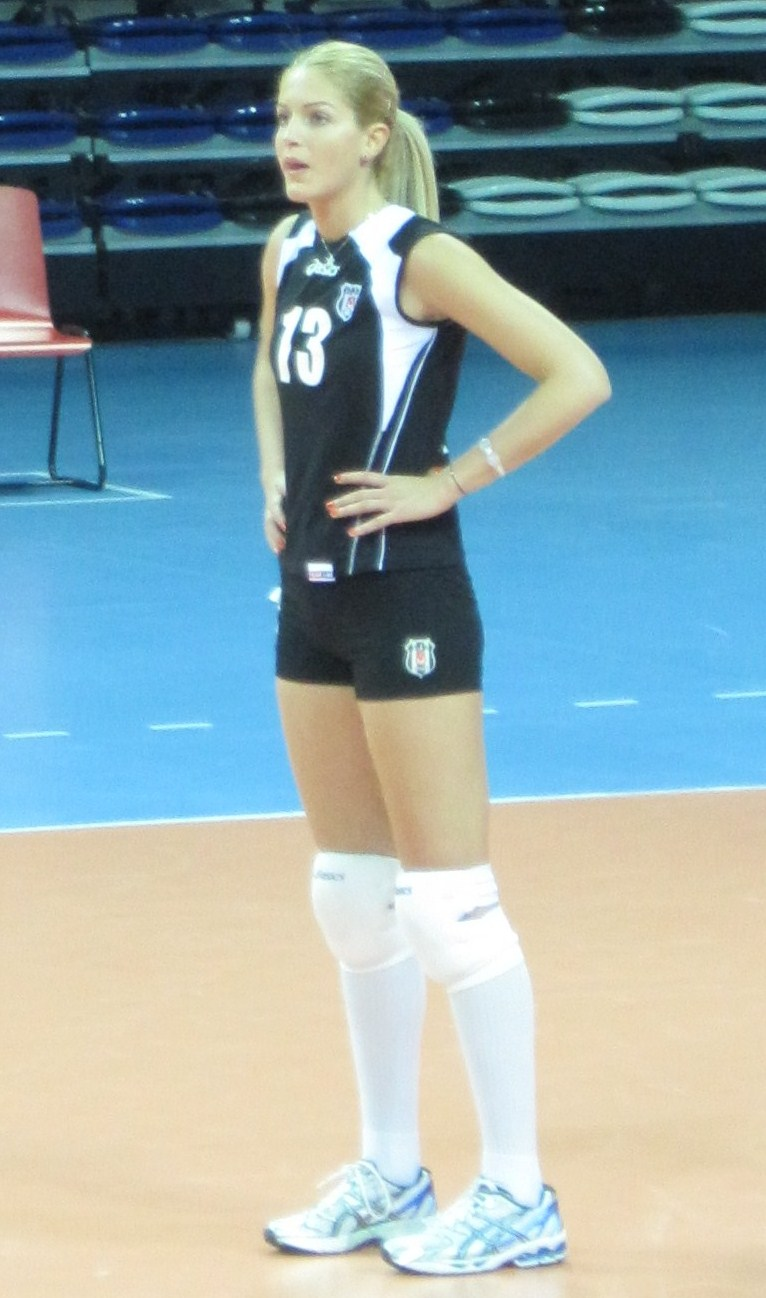

Personal information
- Full name: Sinem Barut
- Born: April 12, 1986 (age 40); İzmir
- Height: 1.86 m (6 ft 1 in)

Volleyball information
- Position: Middle Blocker
- Current club: Galatasaray
- Number: 2

Career
Years	Teams
-2009; 2010– 2012–	Ankaragücü SK; Türk Telekom; Göztepe; Beşiktaş JK; Galatasaray

National team
Turkey

Sinem Barut (born April 12, 1986) is a Turkish volleyball player. She is 186 cm and plays as middle blocker. She plays for Galatasaray.

== Awards ==
=== Club ===
- 2011-12 Turkish Cup - Runner-up, with Galatasaray Daikin
- 2011-12 CEV Cup - Runner-up, with Galatasaray Daikin
- 2012 Turkish Volleyball Super Cup - Runner-Up, with Galatasaray Daikin
- 2012-2013 Turkish Women's Volleyball Cup - Bronze Medal with Galatasaray Daikin

== See also ==
- Turkish women in sports
