= Merve Tanıl =

Turkish volleyball player (born 1990)

Personal information
- Full name: Merve Tanıl
- Born: February 22, 1990 (age 36); Ankara, Turkey
- Height: 1.80 m (5 ft 11 in)

Volleyball information
- Position: Setter
- Current club: Yeşilyurtspor
- Number: 12

Career
Years
- 2007-08
- 2008-11
- 2011-12
- 2012-13
Teams
- Vakıfbank Güneş Sigorta
- Fenerbahçe Acıbadem
- Ereğli Belediye
- İBA Kimya TED Ankara Kolejliler

National team
2007-present	Turkey

Merve Tanıl (born February 22, 1990, in Ankara) is a Turkish volleyball player. She is 180 cm and plays as setter. She played for |İBA Kimya TED Ankara Kolejliler before she was transferred by Yeşilyurtspor for the 2013-14 season. She also played for Vakıfbank Güneş Sigorta, Fenerbahçe Acıbadem and Ereğli Belediye in the past. She studied at Bahçeşehir University in Istanbul.

With Fenerbahçe Acıbadem, she won the Turkish Super Cup, Teledünya Turkish Cup, Turkish Women's Volleyball League and became runner-up at 2009–10 CEV Women's Champions League.

== See also ==
- Turkish women in sports
