= Ece Hocaoğlu =

Turkish volleyball player (born 1994)

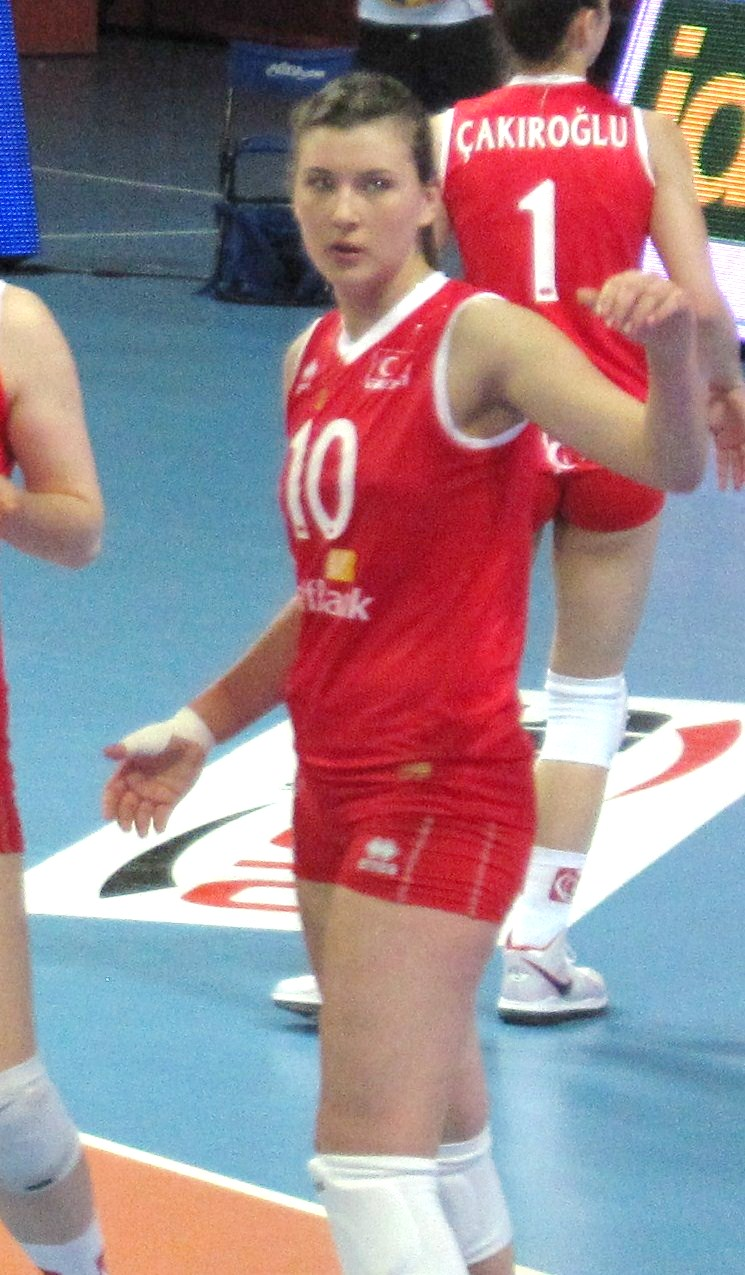

Personal information
- Born: March 5, 1994 (age 32); Bursa, Turkey
- Height: 1.86 m (6 ft 1 in)
- Weight: 82 kg (181 lb)
- Spike: 296 cm (117 in)
- Block: 280 cm (110 in)

Volleyball information
- Position: Wing spiker
- Current club: Beşiktaş Women's Volleyball
- Number: 10

Career
Years	Teams
2006-2009; 2009-2011; 2011-2012	(Turkey) Ankara VakıfBank (Turkey) TVF Sport High School (Turkey) Nilüfer Belediyespor

National team
2011-	Turkey
Honours
Women's volleyball
Representing Turkey women's youth national volleyball team
Women's Junior European Championship
Gold medal – first place	2012 Ankara	Team
Girls Youth World Championship
Gold medal – first place	2011 Ankara	Team
Girls Youth European Championship
Gold medal – first place	2011 Ankara	Team
European Youth Olympic Festival
Bronze medal – third place	2011 Trabzon	Team

Ece Hocaoğlu (born March 5, 1994, in Bursa, Turkey) is a Turkish female volleyball player. She is 186 cm (6.10 ft) tall at 82 kg (181 lb) and plays in the wing spiker position. Currently, she plays for Beşiktaş Women's Volleyball in Istanbul. In the 2011-12 season, she was with Nilüfer Belediyespor in her hometown. Hocaoğlu is a member of the Turkey women's youth national volleyball team, and wears number 10.

Her elder sister Tuğçe Hocaoğlu (born 1988) is also a professional volleyball player.

== Clubs ==
- (Turkey) Ankara VakıfBank (2006-2009)
- (Turkey) TVF Sport High School (2009-2011)
- (Turkey) Nilüfer Belediyespor (2011-2012)
- (Turkey) Beşiktaş Women's Volleyball Team (2012-2013)

== Awards ==
=== Individual ===
- *2011 CEV Girls Youth Volleyball European Championship - Most Valuable Player

=== National team ===
- 2011 European Youth Summer Olympic Festival - Bronze
- 2011 FIVB Girls Youth World Championship - Gold
- 2011 CEV Girls Youth Volleyball European Championship - Gold
- 2012 Women's Junior European Volleyball Championship - Gold

== See also ==
- Turkish women in sports
