= Ceyda Aktaş =

Turkish volleyball player (born 1994)

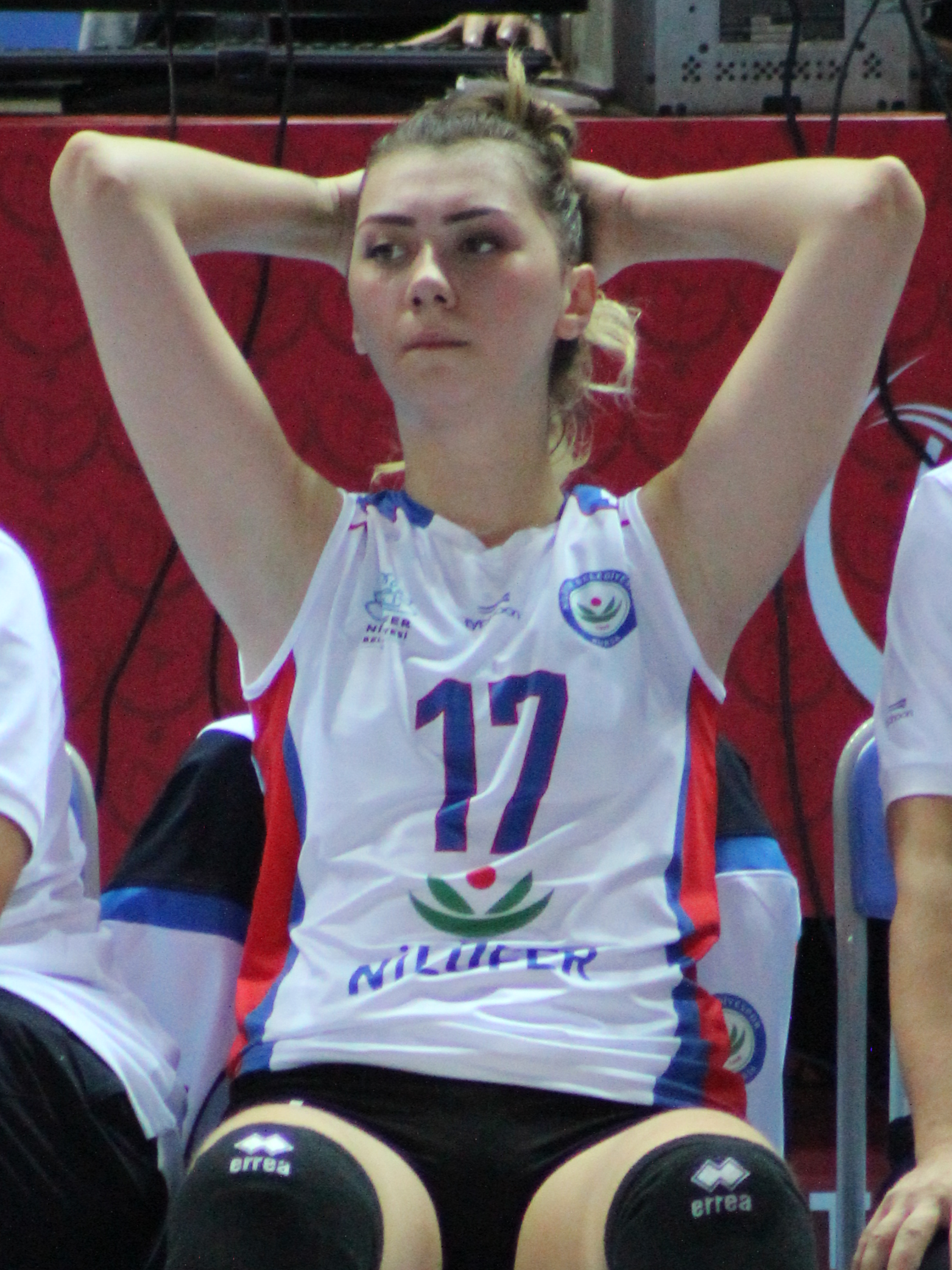

Personal information
- Born: August 18, 1994 (age 32); Ankara, Turkey
- Height: 1.89 m (6 ft 2 1/2 in)
- Weight: 77 kg (170 lb)
- Spike: 295 cm (116 in)
- Block: 287 cm (113 in)

Volleyball information
- Position: Wing spiker
- Current club: Thanh Hóa VC
- Number: 36

Career
Years
- 2004-2009
- 2009-2011
- 2011-2012
- 2012-2013
Teams
- Ankara VakıfBank
- TVF Sport High School
- VakıfBank Türk Telekom
- TED Ankara Kolejliler

National team
- 2011
- 2012-present
- (Turkey) Girls' youth
- (Turkey) Women's junior
Honours
Women's volleyball
Representing Turkey
Women's Junior European Championship
Gold medal – first place	2012 Ankara	Team
Girls Youth World Championship
Gold medal – first place	2011 Ankara	Team
Girls Youth European Championship
Gold medal – first place	2011 Ankara	Team

Ceyda Aktaş (born August 18, 1994 in Ankara, Turkey) is a Turkish volleyball player. She is 189 cm (6.20 ft) tall at 77 kg (170 lb) and plays in the wing spiker position.

Ceyda describes herself as having been hyperactive in her childhood. For this, her parents channelized her to performing sports and dancing. She first began with playing basketball, but left it because she was not interested anymore. Ceyda then learned and performed Latin dances, participating at dance competitions as well. Due to her height, she was discovered by volleyball coaches Zeycan Acar and Taner Atik, who visited her class in the school while searching for potential volleyballers. At the age of ten, Ceyda began playing volleyball in 2004 as a member of Ankara VakıfBank's girls team.

After having played for TVF Sport High School in 2009-2011, she transferred to the Istanbul club VakıfBank Türk Telekom in the 2011-12 season. She returned to her hometown to study at TED University. Ceyda is currently with the TED Ankara Kolejliler. Aktaş debuted in the Turkey girls' youth national volleyball team in 2011 and is currently a member of the Turkey women's junior national volleyball team. She wears number 7.

== Clubs ==
- (Turkey) Ankara VakıfBank (2004-2009)
- (Turkey) TVF Sport High School (2009-2011)
- (Turkey) VakıfBank Türk Telekom (2011-2012)
- (Turkey) TED Ankara Kolejliler (2012-2013)
- (Turkey) Beşiktaş J.K. (2013-2014)
- (Turkey) Çanakkale Belediyespor (2014-2015)
- (Turkey) Halkbank Ankara (2015-2016)
- (Turkey) Nilüfer Belediyespor (2016-2017)
- (Turkey) Beylikdüzü (2017-2018)
- (Turkey) Beşiktaş J.K. (2018-2019)
- (Turkey) Kuzeyboru Spor Club (2019-2020)
- (Turkey) PTT Spor (2020-2021)
- (Greece) ASP Thetis (2021-2022)
- (Hungary) Békéscsabai RSE (2022-2023)
- (Belarus) Minchanka Minsk (2023-2024)
- (Turkey) Sarıyer Belediyespor (2024)
- (China) Liaoning Donggang Strawberry Alliance (2024-2025)
- (Vietnam) Thanh Hóa VC (2025)

== Awards ==
=== Individuals ===
- 2013 FIVB Junior World Championship "Best Opposite"

=== National team ===
- 2011 CEV Girls Youth Volleyball European Championship - Gold
- 2011 FIVB Girls Youth World Championship - Gold
- 2012 Women's Junior European Volleyball Championship - Gold

== See also ==
- Turkish women in sports
