= Ceren Nur Domaç =

Turkish volleyball player (born 1999)

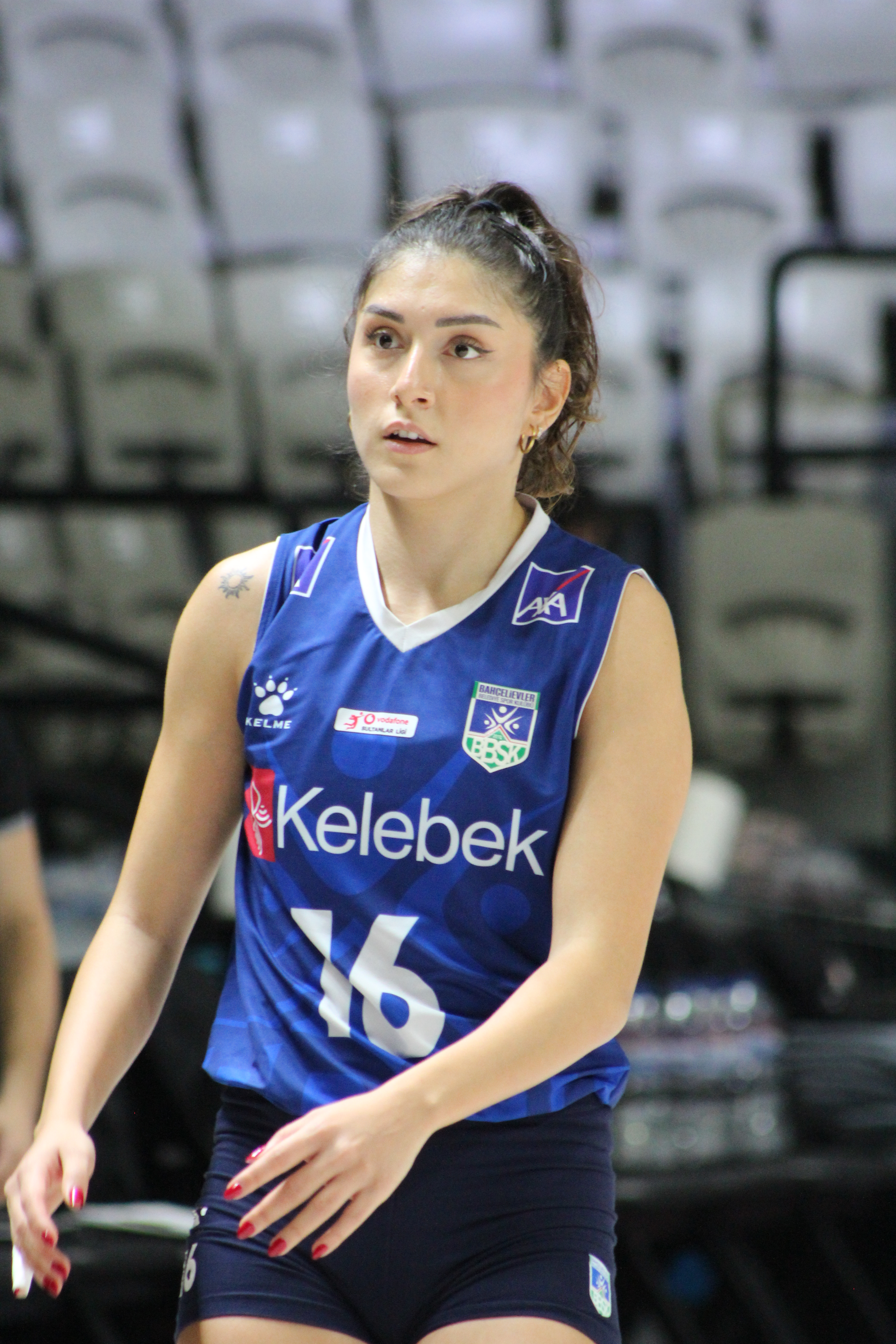
- Ceren Nur Domaç (#16) of Bahçelievler Bld. (2024)

Personal information
- Born: 16 July 1999 (age 27); Eskişehir, Turkey
- Height: 188 cm (6 ft 2 in)
- Weight: 69 kg (152 lb)
- Spike: 298 cm (117 in)
- Block: 295 cm (116 in)

Volleyball information
- Position: Middle blocker
- Current club: Aras Kargo

Career
Years	Teams
2014–2016	ES Voleybol U16
2017–2018	Eczacıbaşı VitrA
2018–2020	Sarıyer Bld.
2020–2021	Kuzeyboru
2021–2022	PTT Spor
2022–2023	Çukurova Bld.
2023–2025	Bahçelievler Bld.
2025–20276	Beşiktaş
2026–	Aras Kargo

National team
2015	Turkeu U16
2015	Turkey U19
2017	Turkey U21

Ceren Nur Domaç (born 16 July 1999) is a Turkish professional volleyball player. She plays as middle blocker in the Turkish Women's Volleyball League for Aras Kargo.

== Club career ==
Domaç stands at 188 cm (6 ft 2 in) tall and weighs 69 kg (152 lb). She has a spike height of 298 cm (9 ft 9 1/2 in) and a block height of 295 cm (9 ft 8 in). She plays in the middle blocker position.

She started her sport career entering the hometown club ES Voleybol in 2008. In the years 2014–2016, she played in the club youth academy. In 2015, she won the Turkish Girls' Cadet Championship. At the age of sixteen, she joined the youth system of the Istanbul-based club Eczacıbaşı VitrA, and soon was promoted to the senior team. She played at the 2017–18 Women's CEV Cup, and won the cup title. After one season, she transferred to Sarıyer Bld. also in Istanbul. Her next clubs were Kuzeyboru in Aksaray, PTT Spor in Ankara, Çukurova Bld in Adana, Bahçelievler Bld. and Beşiktaş in Istanbul. In June 2026, she signed with the İzmir-based club Aras Kargo from İzmir.

== International career ==
=== Turkey U16 ===
Domaç played for Turkey girls' national U16 team at the 2015 Girls' Youth Balkan Championships in Romania. Her team lost the finals match against Serbia, and took the silver medal. She was named the "Best Outside Hitter".

=== Turkey U19 ===
She represented her country playing in the Turkey women's national U19 team, and captured the gold medal at the 2015 European Youth Summer Olympic Festival in Tbilisi, Georgia.

=== Turkey U21 ===
She was part of the Turkey women's national U21 team at the 2017 FIVB Volleyball Women's U20 World Championship in Mexico. Her team finished the championship on the fourth place after losing the bronze-medal match against Japan.

== Personal life ==
Ceren Nur Domaç was born in Eskişehir, Turkey on 16 July 1999.
