= Cemre Erol =

Turkish volleyball player

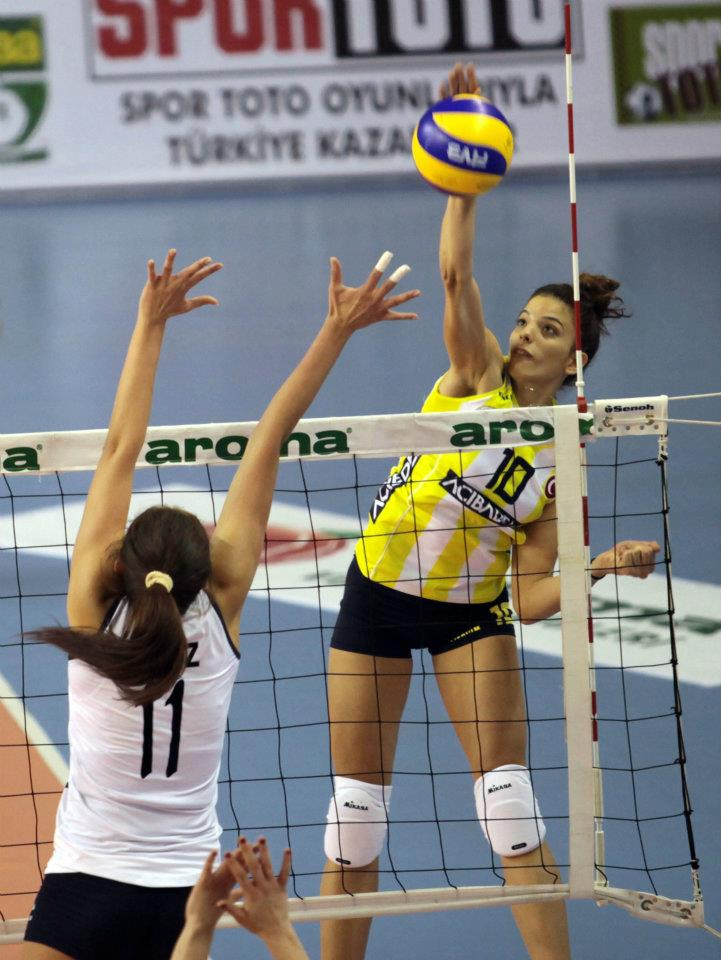

Personal information
- Born: May 18, 1992 (age 34); Ankara, Turkey
- Height: 1.83 m (6 ft 0 in)
- Weight: 68 kg (150 lb)
- Education: İstanbul Bilgi University

Volleyball information
- Position: Outside hitter
- Current club: Türk Hava Yolları SK
- Number: 16

Career
Years	Teams
2009–2010; 2010–2012; 2012–2013; 2013–2014; 2014–2015; 2015–2016; 2016-present	Fenerbahçe Acıbadem; Ted Ankara Kolejliler SK; Konya Ereğli Belediyespor; Halkbank SK; Nilüfer Belediyespor; Çanakkale Belediyespor; Türk Hava Yolları SK

National team
Turkey youth Turkey junior

Cemre Erol (born May 18, 1992, in Ankara) is a Turkish volleyball player. She is 183 cm tall and plays as outside hitter.

She started her volleyball life when she was 12. She played for Fenerbahçe Acıbadem, Ted Ankara Kolejliler SK, Nilüfer Belediyespor, and Halkbank SK. Currently, she is playing for Türk Hava Yolları SK.

== National team ==
- 2008 Turkey Youth Girls National Volleyball Team – Balkan Champion / Greece
- 2009 Turkey Youth Girls National Volleyball Team – European Championship 5th / Holland
- 2009 Turkey Youth Girls National Volleyball Team – World Championship 4th / Thailand
- 2011 Turkey Junior Girls National Volleyball Team – Balkan Championship 3rd / Serbia

== Club teams ==
- 2010 Eczacıbaşı Sports Club – Junior Girls Champion of Turkey
- 2010 Fenerbahçe Acıbadem
- 1.Indesit Champions League 2nd.
- 2.Turkey Cup Champion
- 3.Turkey Aroma Women's Champion of 1. Division
- 2011 Emlak Toki Sports Club – Champion of 2. Division

== Education ==
- 1999–2009 Ankara Gazi University Foundation Primary/Secondary/High School
- 2009–2010 Istek Private Acıbadem Schools – High School Graduation
- 2012–2014 Anadolu University – Radio TV Programming associate degree
- 2014-still Istanbul Bilgi University – Public Relations Bachelor

== Gallery ==
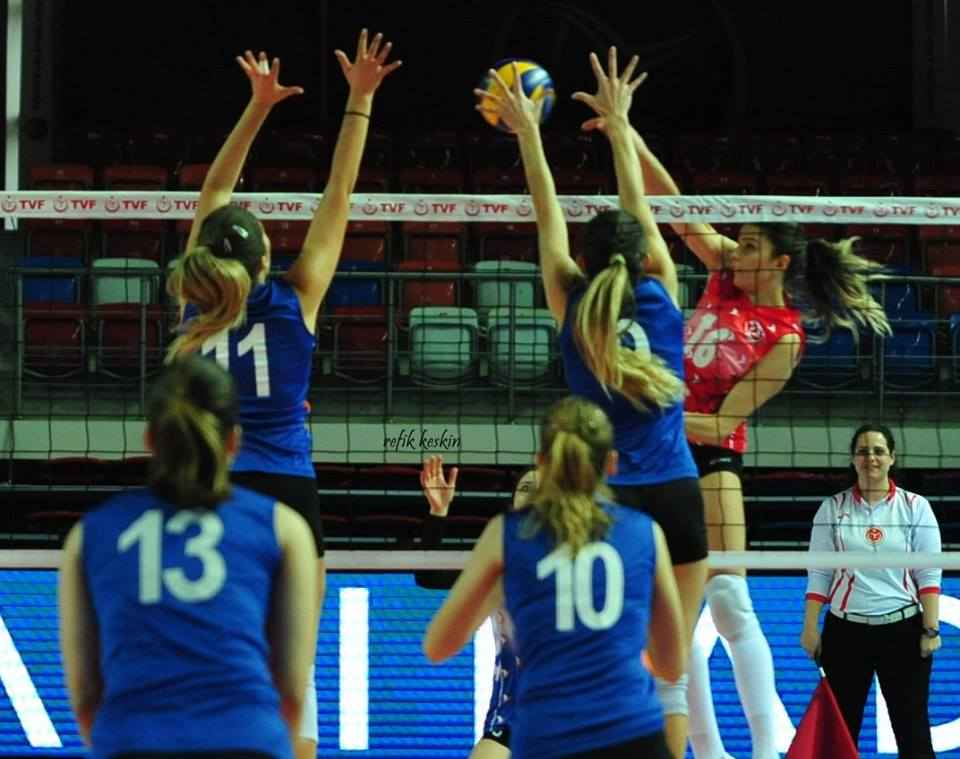
THY – 2016

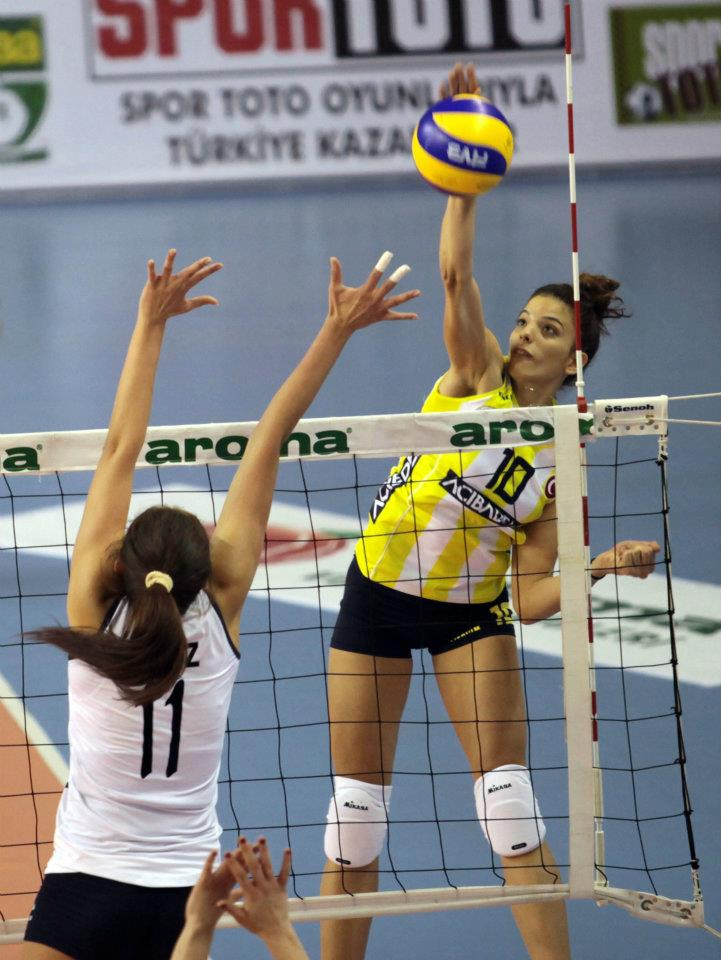
Fenerbahçe Acıbadem 2010

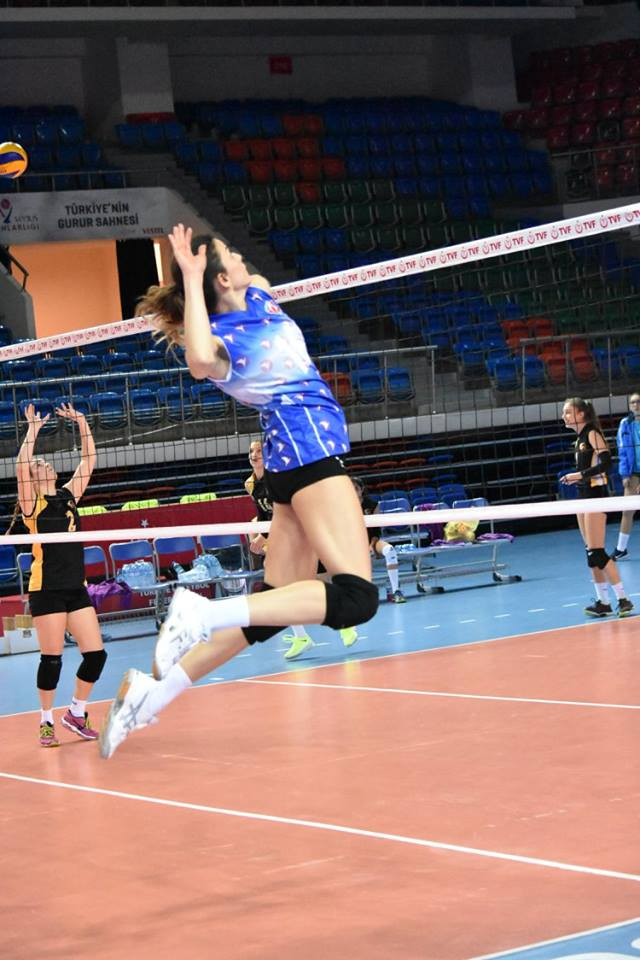
THY 2016

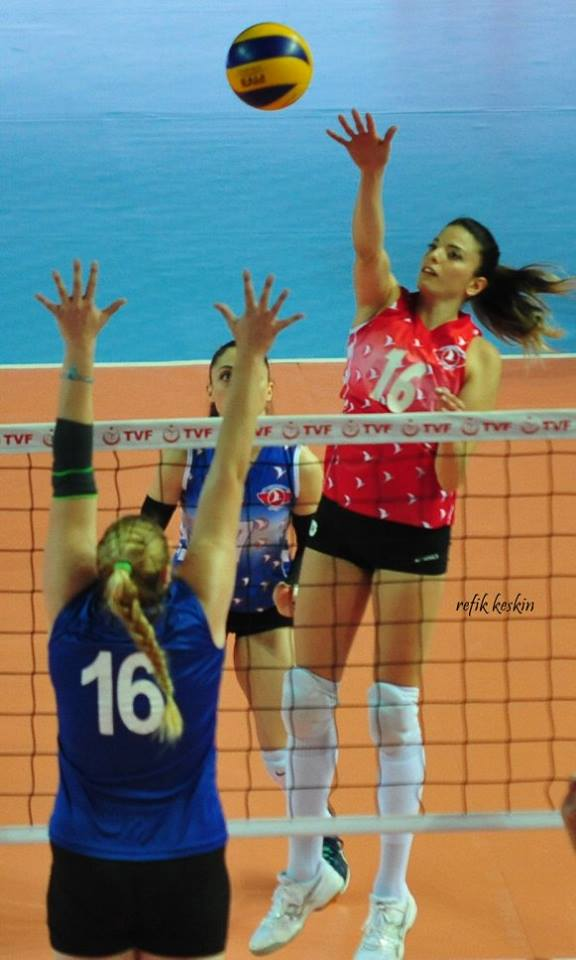
Cemre #16

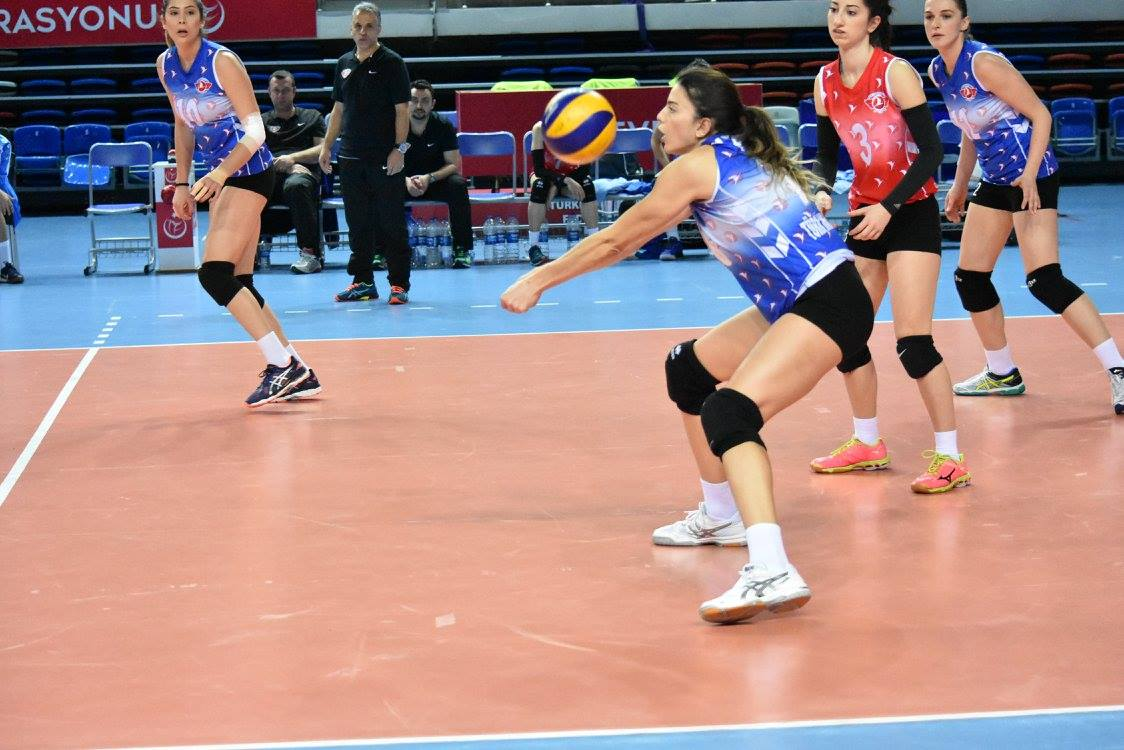
Reception

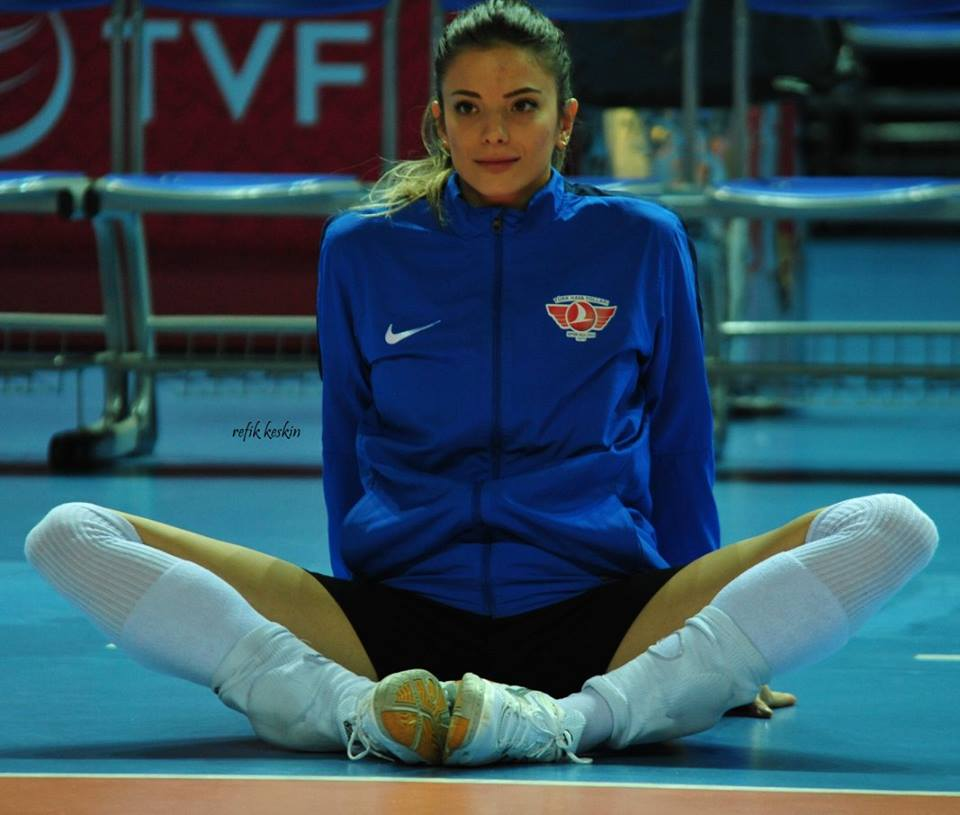
During the strecthing

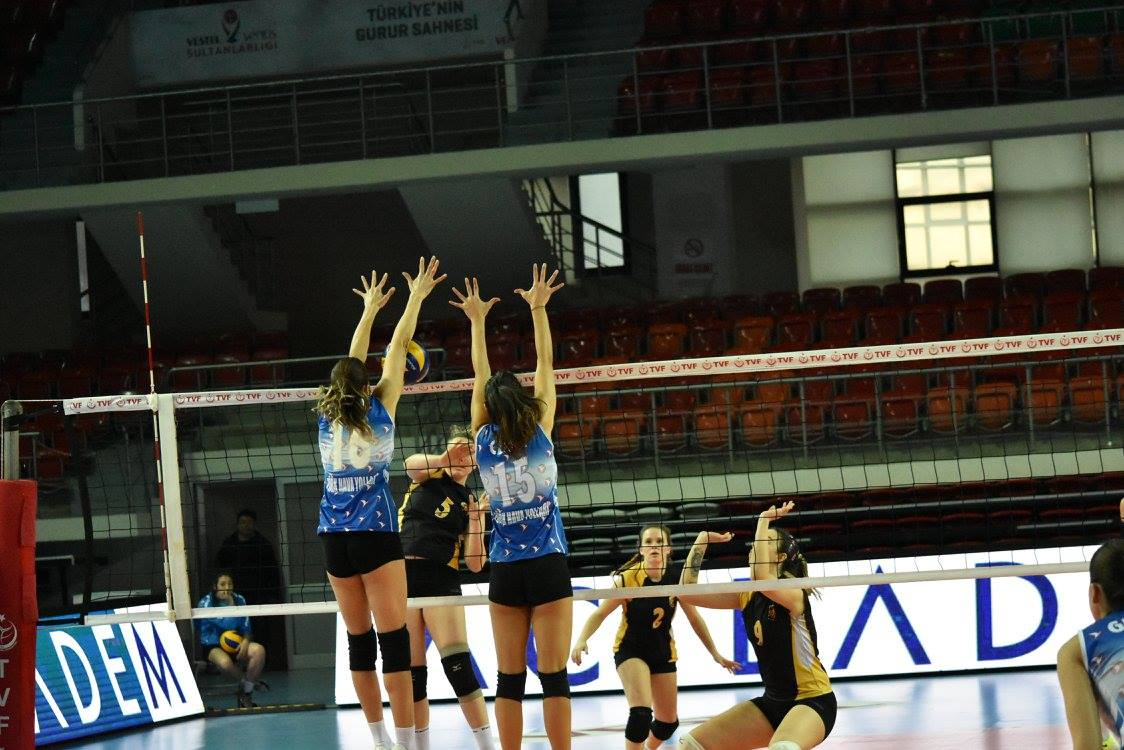
Blocking

== See also ==
- Turkish women in sports
