= Karşıyaka women's volleyball team =

Karşıyaka SK
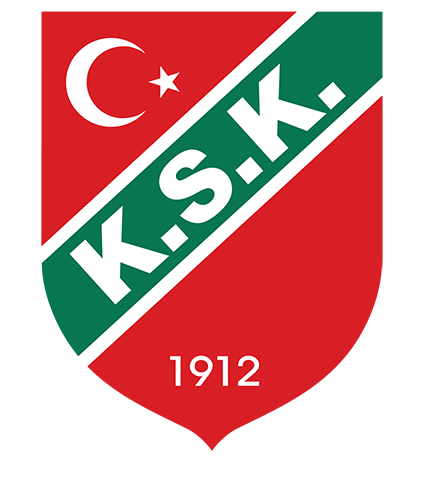
- Full name: Karşıyaka Sports Club Women's Volleyball
- Short name: Karşıyaka
- Founded: 1912
- Ground: Karşıyaka Arena (Capacity: 6,500)
- Chairman: (Turkey) Aygün Cicibaş
- Manager: (Turkey) Reşat Yazıcıoğulları
- League: Turkish Women's Volleyball Second League
- Website: Club home page

Uniforms
Home	Away

Karşıyaka Women's Volleyball commonly known as Karşıyaka and officially known as Endo Karşıyaka for commercial reasons, are the professional women's volleyball department of Karşıyaka SK, a major Turkish multi-sport club based in İzmir, Turkey. They play their matches at the 6.500-seated Karşıyaka Arena.

== History ==
The team was founded and has been promoted to Turkish First League in the 1982. The team finished the Turkish First League as 3rd in 2006-07 season. It was biggest success in the club history. The team relegated from Turkish First League in the 2010-11 season for the first time in its history. The team still plays in the Turkish Second League.

== Current roster ==
As of October 2025.

Number	Player	Position	Height (m)
1	(Belgium) Helene Rousseaux	Middle blocker	1.88
3	(Turkey) Dilay Göçen	Setter	1.79
4	(Turkey) Selen Naz Kıran	Setter	1.80
5	(Turkey) Alara Altundağ	Libero	1.60
6	(Turkey) Hatice Secem Ege	Middle blocker	1.85
7	(Turkey) Zeynep Özcuraş	Outside Hitter	1.81
10	(Turkey) Şevval Acıbal	Outside Hitter	1.78
11	(Turkey) Buse Kara Cılkız	Outside Hitter	1.80
12	(Turkey) Hanife Nur Özaydınlı	Middle blocker	1.88
14	(Turkey) Belkız Bayri	Middle blocker	1.86
15	(Turkey) Nehir Döngez	Outside Hitter	1.85
17	(Russia) Anastasia Lyashko	Middle blocker	1.98
19	(Turkey) Defne Başyolcu	Opposite Hitters	1.93
88	(Bulgaria) Iveta Stanchulova	Hitter	1.86

== See also ==
- Karşıyaka SK
