= 2011 FIVB Volleyball Girls' U18 World Championship =

2011 FIVB Girls Youth World Championship
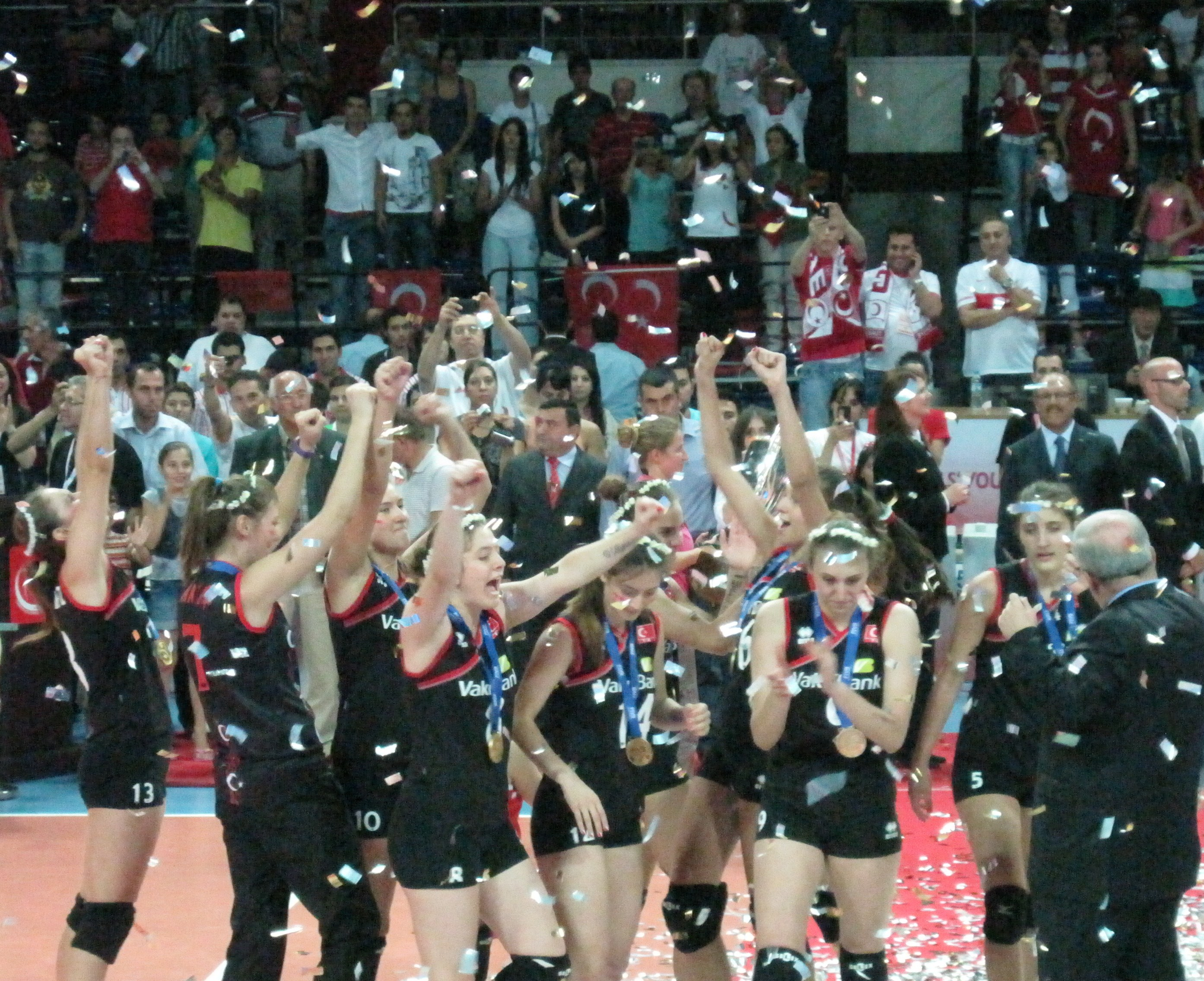
- 2011 FIVB Girls Youth Volleyball World Championship awarding ceremony. World Champion Turkey celebrates with the cup.

Tournament details
- Host country: Turkey
- Dates: August 12–21
- Teams: 16
- Venues: 2 (in Ankara host cities)

Final positions
- Champions: Turkey (1st title)

Tournament awards
- MVP: Damla Çakıroğlu (TUR)

The 2011 FIVB Girls Youth Volleyball World Championship was held in Ankara, Turkey, from 12 to 21 August 2011. 16 teams participated in the tournament.

== Qualification process ==
Confederation	Method of Qualification	Date	Venue	Vacancies	Qualified
FIVB	Host			1	Turkey
NORCECA	2010 NORCECA Youth Championship	April 6 – 11, 2010	Guatemala City, Guatemala	3	United States; Mexico; Puerto Rico
AVC	2010 Asian Youth Championship	May 20 – 26, 2010	Kuala Lumpur, Malaysia	3	Japan; China; Thailand
CSV	2010 South American Youth Championship	August 24 – 29, 2010	Callao, Peru	2	Brazil; Argentina
CAVB	2011 African Youth Championship	January 2–4, 2011	Cairo, Egypt	2	Egypt; Algeria
CEV	2011 European Youth Championship	April 30 – May 8, 2011	Ankara, Turkey	5	Italy; Serbia; Germany; Poland; Slovakia
Total				16	

== Competing nations ==
The following national teams have qualified:

Pool A	Pool B	Pool C	Pool D
Egypt; Poland; Turkey; Algeria	Brazil; Slovakia; Mexico; Argentina	United States; Puerto Rico; Serbia; China	Japan; Italy; Germany; Thailand

== Venues ==
- Başkent Volleyball Hall (7,600 seats) – Pool A, C
- Ankara Arena (10,400 seats) – Pool B, D

== First round ==
=== Pool A ===
Pos	Team	Pld	W	L	Pts	SPW	SPL	SPR	SW	SL	SR	Qualification
1	Turkey	3	3	0	9	225	140	1.607	9	0	MAX	Pool E
2	Poland	3	2	1	6	206	161	1.280	6	3	2.000	Pool F
3	Egypt	3	1	2	3	198	226	0.876	3	7	0.429	Pool G
4	Algeria	3	0	3	0	143	245	0.584	1	9	0.111	Pool H

Date		Score		Set 1	Set 2	Set 3	Set 4	Set 5	Total
12 Aug	Poland	3–0	Egypt	25–13	25–16	26–24			76–53
12 Aug	Turkey	3–0	Algeria	25–8	25–13	25–14			75–35
13 Aug	Poland	3–0	Algeria	25–7	25–13	25–13			75–33
13 Aug	Turkey	3–0	Egypt	25–9	25–21	25–20			75–50
14 Aug	Egypt	3–1	Algeria	25–19	25–13	20–25	25–18		95–75
14 Aug	Turkey	3–0	Poland	25–23	25–17	25–15			75–55

=== Pool B ===
Pos	Team	Pld	W	L	Pts	SPW	SPL	SPR	SW	SL	SR	Qualification
1	Brazil	3	3	0	9	248	170	1.459	9	1	9.000	Pool F
2	Argentina	3	2	1	5	236	233	1.013	6	5	1.200	Pool E
3	Mexico	3	1	2	3	211	226	0.934	4	6	0.667	Pool H
4	Slovakia	3	0	3	1	195	261	0.747	2	9	0.222	Pool G

Date		Score		Set 1	Set 2	Set 3	Set 4	Set 5	Total
12 Aug	Brazil	3–0	Slovakia	25–13	25–12	25–21			75–46
12 Aug	Argentina	3–0	Mexico	25–21	25–19	25–22			75–62
13 Aug	Slovakia	2–3	Argentina	25–23	18–25	23–25	25–23	5–15	96–111
13 Aug	Brazil	3–1	Mexico	25–13	23–25	25–14	25–22		98–74
14 Aug	Slovakia	0–3	Mexico	21–25	18–25	14–25			53–75
14 Aug	Brazil	3–0	Argentina	25–17	25–20	25–13			75–50

=== Pool C ===
Pos	Team	Pld	W	L	Pts	SPW	SPL	SPR	SW	SL	SR	Qualification
1	China	3	3	0	9	249	194	1.284	9	1	9.000	Pool E
2	Serbia	3	2	1	6	212	175	1.211	6	3	2.000	Pool F
3	United States	3	1	2	3	215	226	0.951	4	6	0.667	Pool G
4	Puerto Rico	3	0	3	0	144	225	0.640	0	9	0.000	Pool H

Date		Score		Set 1	Set 2	Set 3	Set 4	Set 5	Total
12 Aug	United States	3–0	Puerto Rico	25–14	25–20	25–17			75–51
12 Aug	Serbia	0–3	China	18–25	20–25	23–25			61–75
13 Aug	China	3–0	Puerto Rico	25–22	25–18	25–11			75–51
13 Aug	Serbia	3–0	United States	25–21	25–13	26–24			76–58
14 Aug	Serbia	3–0	Puerto Rico	25–13	25–8	25–21			75–42
14 Aug	China	3–1	United States	24–26	25–15	25–22	25–20		99–82

=== Pool D ===
Pos	Team	Pld	W	L	Pts	SPW	SPL	SPR	SW	SL	SR	Qualification
1	Japan	3	3	0	8	252	223	1.130	9	2	4.500	Pool F
2	Germany	3	2	1	7	277	255	1.086	8	4	2.000	Pool E
3	Italy	3	1	2	3	237	236	1.004	4	6	0.667	Pool H
4	Thailand	3	0	3	0	175	227	0.771	0	9	0.000	Pool G

Date		Score		Set 1	Set 2	Set 3	Set 4	Set 5	Total
12 Aug	Italy	0–3	Japan	20–25	20–25	21–25			61–75
12 Aug	Germany	3–0	Thailand	25–18	25–16	25–20			75–54
13 Aug	Italy	3–0	Thailand	25–20	25–17	27–25			77–62
13 Aug	Japan	3–2	Germany	17–25	20–25	25–23	25–18	15–12	102–103
14 Aug	Italy	1–3	Germany	29–31	25–16	25–27	20–25		99–99
14 Aug	Japan	3–0	Thailand	25–16	25–23	25–20			75–59

== Second round ==
=== Pool E ===
Pos	Team	Pld	W	L	Pts	SPW	SPL	SPR	SW	SL	SR	Qualification
1	China	3	3	0	9	245	187	1.310	9	1	9.000	Classification 1st–4th
2	Turkey	3	2	1	6	237	191	1.241	7	3	2.333	Classification 1st–4th
3	Germany	3	1	2	3	178	203	0.877	3	6	0.500	Classification 5th–8th
4	Argentina	3	0	3	0	146	225	0.649	0	9	0.000	Classification 5th–8th

Date		Score		Set 1	Set 2	Set 3	Set 4	Set 5	Total
16 Aug	China	3–0	Argentina	25–17	25–19	25–7			75–43
16 Aug	Turkey	3–0	Germany	25–13	25–20	25–13			75–46
17 Aug	China	3–0	Germany	25–23	25–23	25–11			75–57
17 Aug	Turkey	3–0	Argentina	25–14	25–18	25–18			75–50
18 Aug	China	3–1	Turkey	25–21	19–25	26–24	25–17		95–87
18 Aug	Germany	3–0	Argentina	25–21	25–16	25–16			75–53

=== Pool F ===
Pos	Team	Pld	W	L	Pts	SPW	SPL	SPR	SW	SL	SR	Qualification
1	Serbia	3	3	0	8	289	245	1.180	9	3	3.000	Classification 1st–4th
2	Poland	3	1	2	4	287	301	0.953	6	7	0.857	Classification 1st–4th
3	Brazil	3	1	2	3	309	306	1.010	6	8	0.750	Classification 5th–8th
4	Japan	3	1	2	3	225	258	0.872	4	7	0.571	Classification 5th–8th

Date		Score		Set 1	Set 2	Set 3	Set 4	Set 5	Total
16 Aug	Serbia	3–2	Brazil	26–28	21–25	25–21	25–17	17–15	114–106
16 Aug	Japan	1–3	Poland	23–25	17–25	25–21	20–25		85–96
17 Aug	Brazil	3–2	Poland	25–17	24–26	27–29	25–22	15–7	116–101
17 Aug	Serbia	3–0	Japan	25–17	25–12	25–20			75–49
18 Aug	Brazil	1–3	Japan	23–25	24–26	25–15	15–25		87–91
18 Aug	Serbia	3–1	Poland	25–19	24–26	26–24	25–21		100–90

=== Pool G ===
Pos	Team	Pld	W	L	Pts	SPW	SPL	SPR	SW	SL	SR	Qualification
1	United States	3	3	0	9	240	186	1.290	9	0	MAX	Classification 9th–12th
2	Slovakia	3	2	1	5	240	236	1.017	6	5	1.200	Classification 9th–12th
3	Thailand	3	1	2	4	237	233	1.017	5	6	0.833	Classification 13th–16th
4	Egypt	3	0	3	0	168	230	0.730	0	9	0.000	Classification 13th–16th

Date		Score		Set 1	Set 2	Set 3	Set 4	Set 5	Total
16 Aug	Thailand	3–0	Egypt	25–15	25–12	25–22			75–49
16 Aug	United States	3–0	Slovakia	27–25	25–20	25–19			77–64
17 Aug	United States	3–0	Thailand	33–31	25–10	25–22			83–63
17 Aug	Slovakia	3–0	Egypt	25–21	25–20	25–19			75–60
18 Aug	United States	3–0	Egypt	25–16	25–15	30–28			80–59
18 Aug	Thailand	2–3	Slovakia	25–18	17–25	25–16	17–25	15–17	99–101

=== Pool H ===
Pos	Team	Pld	W	L	Pts	SPW	SPL	SPR	SW	SL	SR	Qualification
1	Italy	3	3	0	9	242	173	1.399	9	1	9.000	Classification 9th–12th
2	Mexico	3	2	1	6	210	191	1.099	6	3	2.000	Classification 9th–12th
3	Puerto Rico	3	1	2	3	212	217	0.977	4	6	0.667	Classification 13th–16th
4	Algeria	3	0	3	0	142	225	0.631	0	9	0.000	Classification 13th–16th

Date		Score		Set 1	Set 2	Set 3	Set 4	Set 5	Total
16 Aug	Italy	3–0	Algeria	25–8	25–16	25–18			75–42
16 Aug	Mexico	3–0	Puerto Rico	25–21	25–23	25–22			75–66
17 Aug	Italy	3–1	Puerto Rico	25–15	16–25	25–17	25–14		91–71
17 Aug	Mexico	3–0	Algeria	25–18	25–16	25–15			75–49
18 Aug	Italy	3–0	Mexico	25–18	26–24	25–18			76–60
18 Aug	Puerto Rico	3–0	Algeria	25–15	25–15	25–21			75–51

== Semifinal round ==
=== Classification 13th–16th ===
Date	Time		Score		Set 1	Set 2	Set 3	Set 4	Set 5	Total
20 Aug	11:40	Thailand	3–0	Algeria	25–17	25–8	25–10			75–35
20 Aug	14:00	Puerto Rico	2–3	Egypt	16–25	25–19	25–23	22–25	8–15	107–96

=== Classification 9th–12th ===
Date	Time		Score		Set 1	Set 2	Set 3	Set 4	Set 5	Total
20 Aug	16:30	United States	3–0	Mexico	26–24	25–17	25–20			76–61
20 Aug	19:00	Italy	0–3	Slovakia	23–25	24–26	22–25			69–76

=== Classification 5th–8th ===
Date	Time		Score		Set 1	Set 2	Set 3	Set 4	Set 5	Total
20 Aug	11:30	Germany	3–1	Japan	26–24	25–14	24–26	25–21		100–85
20 Aug	14:00	Brazil	3–2	Argentina	21–25	25–16	23–25	25–14	15–10	109–90

=== Classification 1st–4th ===
Date	Time		Score		Set 1	Set 2	Set 3	Set 4	Set 5	Total
20 Aug	16:30	Serbia	2–3	Turkey	14–25	25–14	17–25	25–20	14–16	95–100
20 Aug	19:00	China	3–1	Poland	25–21	21–25	25–23	25–20		96–89

== Final round ==
=== 15th place match ===
Date	Time		Score		Set 1	Set 2	Set 3	Set 4	Set 5	Total
21 Aug	09:30	Puerto Rico	3–1	Algeria	20–25	25–11	27–25	25–12		97–73

=== 13th place match ===
Date	Time		Score		Set 1	Set 2	Set 3	Set 4	Set 5	Total
21 Aug	11:35	Thailand	3–0	Egypt	25–15	25–15	25–11			75–41

=== 11th place match ===
Date	Time		Score		Set 1	Set 2	Set 3	Set 4	Set 5	Total
21 Aug	13:30	Italy	3–0	Mexico	25–18	25–15	25–20			75–53

=== 9th place match ===
Date	Time		Score		Set 1	Set 2	Set 3	Set 4	Set 5	Total
21 Aug	15:30	United States	3–0	Slovakia	25–21	25–16	25–14			75–51

=== 7th place match ===
Date	Time		Score		Set 1	Set 2	Set 3	Set 4	Set 5	Total
21 Aug	11:00	Japan	3–0	Argentina	25–22	25–20	25–17			75–59

=== 5th place match ===
Date	Time		Score		Set 1	Set 2	Set 3	Set 4	Set 5	Total
21 Aug	13:00	Brazil	1–3	Germany	25–23	18–25	19–25	19–25		81–98

=== 3rd place match ===
Date	Time		Score		Set 1	Set 2	Set 3	Set 4	Set 5	Total
21 Aug	15:00	Serbia	3–0	Poland	25–21	25–13	25–18			75–52

=== Final ===
Date	Time		Score		Set 1	Set 2	Set 3	Set 4	Set 5	Total
21 Aug	17:30	Turkey	3–0	China	25–19	25–17	25–22			75–58

== Final standing ==
Rank	Team
1st place, gold medalist(s)	Turkey
2nd place, silver medalist(s)	China
3rd place, bronze medalist(s)	Serbia
4	Poland
5	Germany
6	Brazil
7	Japan
8	Argentina
9	United States
10	Slovakia
11	Italy
12	Mexico
13	Thailand
14	Egypt
15	Puerto Rico
16	Algeria

2011 FIVB Girls Youth World champions

Turkey
1st title

Team Roster
Damla Çakıroğlu (c), Çağla Akın, Kübra Akman, Şeyma Ercan, Ceylan Arısan, Buket Yılmaz, Aslı Kalaç, Ece Hocaoğlu, Sabriye Gönülkırmaz, Ecem Alıcı, Nursevil Aydınlar and Dilara Bağcı
Head Coach: Şahin Çatma

== Individual awards ==
- Most valuable player
  - Damla Çakıroğlu (TUR)
- Best scorer
  - Gabriela Guimarães (BRA)
- Best spiker
  - Aya Horie (JPN)
- Best blocker
  - Mina Popović (SRB)
- Best server
  - Damla Çakıroğlu (TUR)
- Best digger
  - Liuyan Huang (CHN)
- Best setter
  - Kaho Maruta (JPN)
- Best receiver
  - Dilara Bağcı (TUR)
- Best libero
  - Dilara Bağcı (TUR)
