= TED Ankara Kolejliler Volleyball =

TED Ankara Kolejliler
- Short name: TED Ankara Kolejliler
- Founded: 1954; 72 years ago
- Ground: Başkent Volleyball Hall, Ankara, Turkey
- Chairman: (Turkey) Yusuf Çavuşoğlu
- Manager: (Turkey) Özge Pala Tulu
- League: Turkish Women's Volleyball League
- 2012-13: 12
- Website: Club home page

TED Ankara Kolejliler Women's Volleyball is the women's volleyball section of the Turkish sports club TED Ankara Kolejliler S.K. in Ankara, Turkey. Founded in 1954 in Ankara, the club's colors are blue, red and white. The team plays its home matches at the Başkent Volleyball Hall.

The team is coached by Yusuf Çavuşoğlu.

== 2012-2013 roster ==
Coach: (Turkey) Yusuf Çavuşoğlu

| Jersey No. | Name | Height (m) | Position | Country |
|---|---|---|---|---|
| 1 | Miniriye Vatansever | 1.78 | Outside hitter | Turkey |
| 2 | Merve Çarkçı | 1.80 | Setter | Turkey |
| 4 | Songül Gürsoytrak | 1.73 | Libero | Turkey |
| 6 | Duygu Sipahioğlu | 1.73 | Outside hitter | Turkey |
| 7 | Ceyda Aktaş | 1.90 | Outside hitter | Turkey |
| 8 | Ezgi Yeşiloğlu | 1.80 | Outside hitter | Turkey |
| 9 | Tuğba Toprak | 1.85 | Middle blocker | Turkey |
| 10 | Oleksandra Peretiatko | 1.82 | Setter | Ukraine |
| 11 | Olena Sych | 1.92 | Outside hitter | Ukraine |
| 12 | Merve Tanıl | 1.79 | Setter | Turkey |
| 13 | Ece Gören | 1.65 | Libero | Turkey |
| 14 | Damla Çakıroğlu | 1.81 | Outside hitter | Turkey |
| 17 | Merve Güleç | 1.84 | Middle blocker | Turkey |
