= Sabriye Gönülkırmaz =

Turkish volleyball player (born 1994)

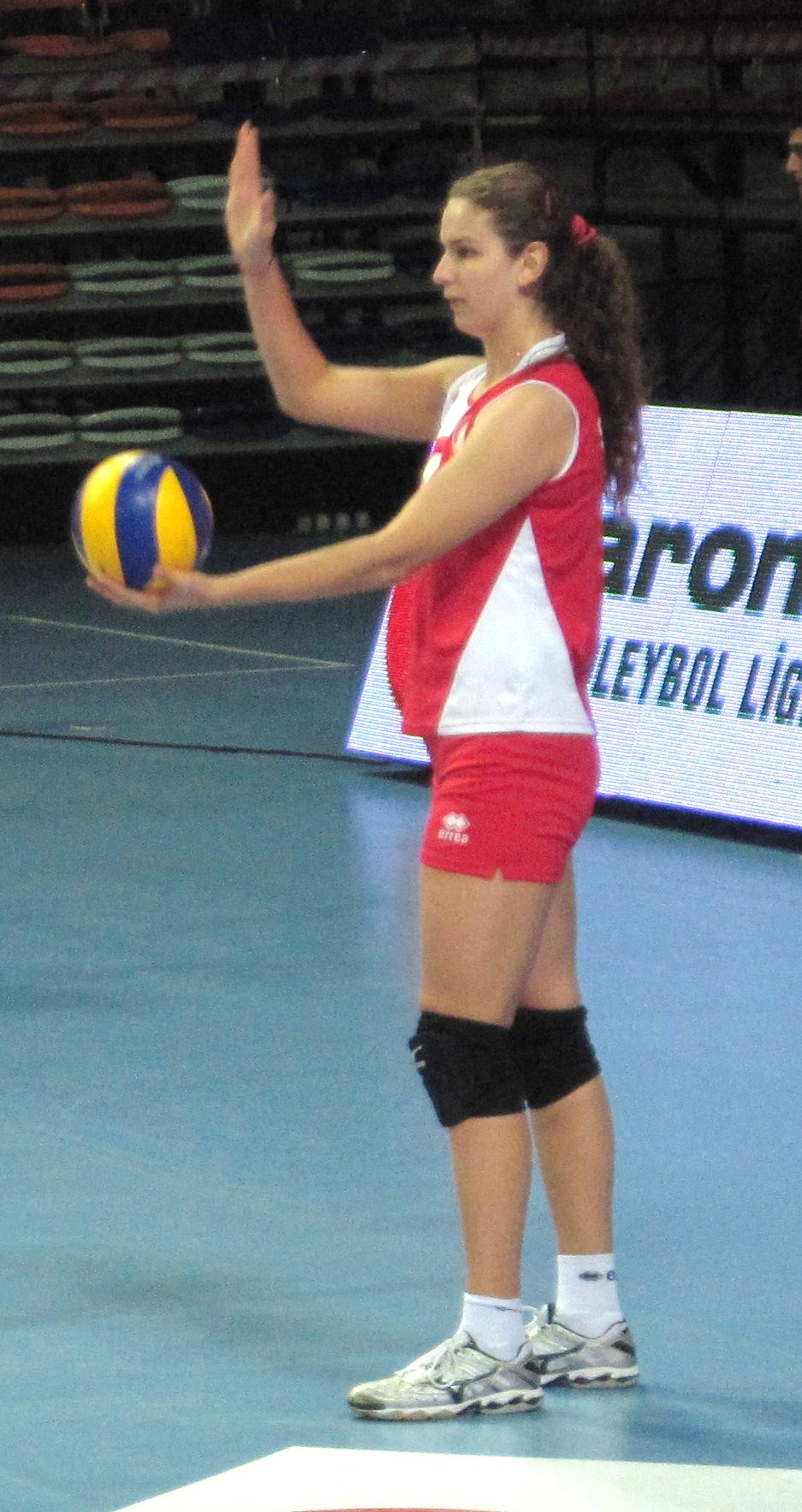

Personal information
- Born: 17 May 1994 (age 32); Istanbul, Turkey
- Height: 1.86 m (6 ft 1 in)
- Weight: 78 kg (172 lb)
- Spike: 298 cm (117 in)
- Block: 288 cm (113 in)

Volleyball information
- Position: Middle blocker (formerly wing spiker)
- Current club: (Turkey) Yeşilyurt
- Number: 13

Career
Years	Teams
2004-2008; 2008-2009; 2009-2011; 2011-2012	(Turkey) Altınyıldız (Turkey) Yeşilyurt (Turkey) TVF Sport High School (Turkey) Yeşilyurt

National team
2011-	Turkey
Honours
Women's volleyball
Representing Turkey women's youth national volleyball team
Women's Junior European Championship
Gold medal – first place	2012 Ankara	Team
Girls Youth World Championship
Gold medal – first place	2011 Ankara	Team
European Youth Olympic Festival
Bronze medal – third place	2011 Trabzon	Team

Sabriye Gönülkırmaz (born 17 May 1994 in Istanbul, Turkey) is a Turkish volleyball player. She is 186 cm (6.10 ft) tall at 78 kg (172 lb). She has played in the past as wing spiker, later changing her position to middle blocker. She currently plays for Yeşilyurt Women's Volleyball Team, which competes in the Turkish Women's Volleyball League. Gönülkırmaz is a member of the Turkey women's youth national volleyball team, and wears number 13.

A native of Istanbul, she began with volleyball sport at the age of nine in Altınyıldız Sport Club, where she was coached by Feyzullah Yücetürk.

== Clubs ==
- (Turkey) Altınyıldız (2004–2008)
- (Turkey) Yeşilyurt (2008–2009)
- (Turkey) TVF Sport High School (2009–2011)
- (Turkey) Yeşilyurt (2011–2012)

== Awards ==
=== National team ===
- 2011 FIVB Girls Youth World Championship – Gold
- 2011 European Youth Summer Olympic Festival – Bronze
- 2012 Women's Junior European Volleyball Championship – Gold

== See also ==
- Turkish women in sports
