= Selim Sırrı Tarcan Sport Hall =

Indoor arena in Ankara, Turkey

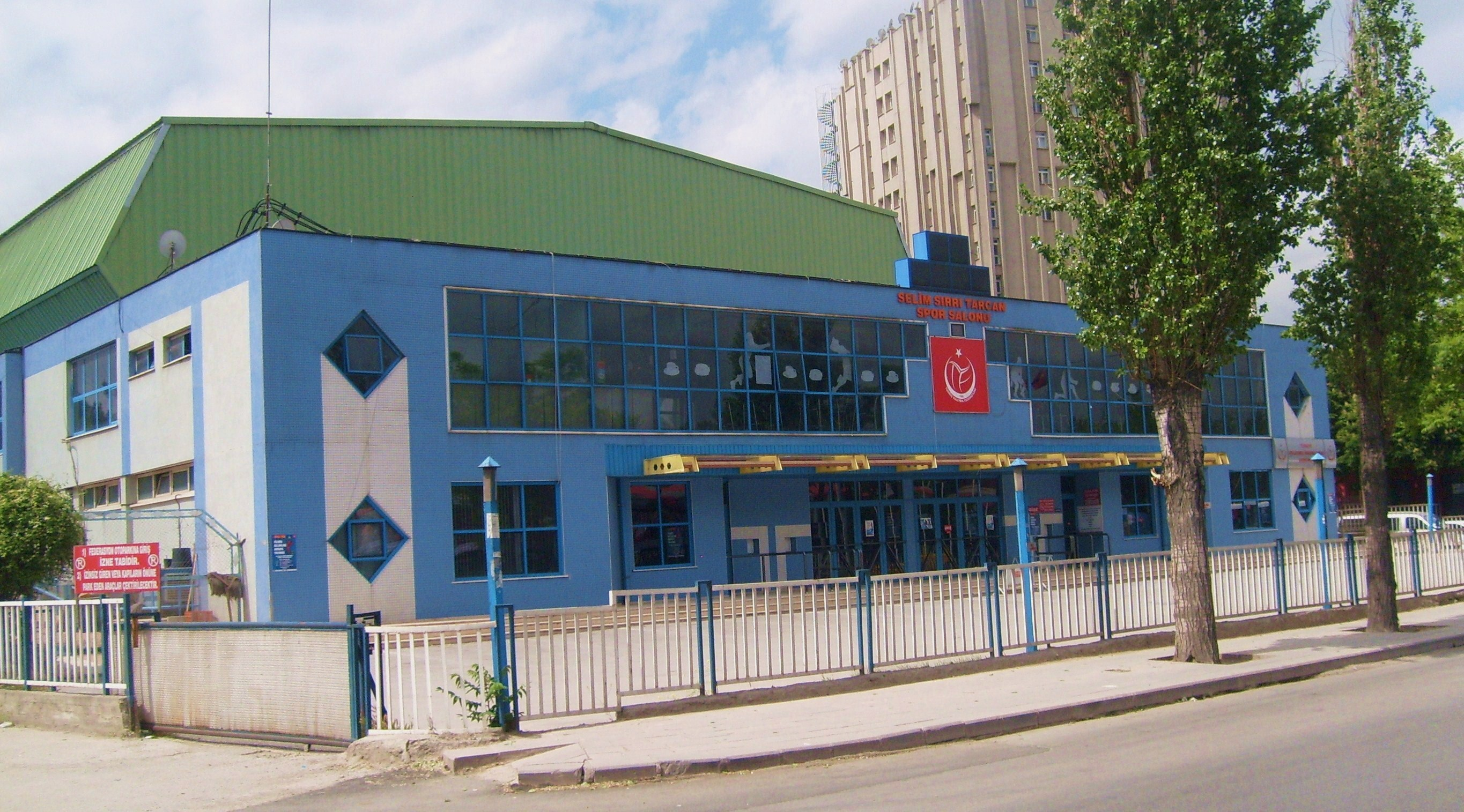
- Interactive map of Selim Sırrı Tarcan Sport Hall
- Location: Altındağ, Ankara, Turkey
- Coordinates: 39.93465°N 32.84892°E
- Owner: Turkish Volleyball Federation
- Capacity: 2,500

Construction
- Groundbreaking: 1958; 68 years ago
- Opened: 1964; 62 years ago
- Architect: Gündüz Gürgen

Tenant
- İller Bankası Women's Volleyball

Selim Sırrı Tarcan Sport Hall (Turkish: Ankara Selim Sırrı Tarcan Spor Salonu) is an indoor arena for volleyball matches located in Altındağ district of Ankara, Turkey. Named after Selim Sırrı Tarcan (1874-1956), founder of the National Olympic Committee of Turkey and a major contributor to volleyball sport in Turkey, the venue has a seating capacity of 2,500 spectators.

Designed by architect Gündüz Güngen, its construction began in 1958 and completed in 1964. The sport hall was commissioned by the Turkish State Railways (TCDD), however it was handed over to the Directorate of Physical Education after 5–6 months of its opening. In April 2006, the venue was transferred to the Turkish Volleyball Federation for a time span of 49 years.

The venue is home to İller Bankası Women's Volleyball, which plays in the Turkish Women's Volleyball League.

== Gallery ==
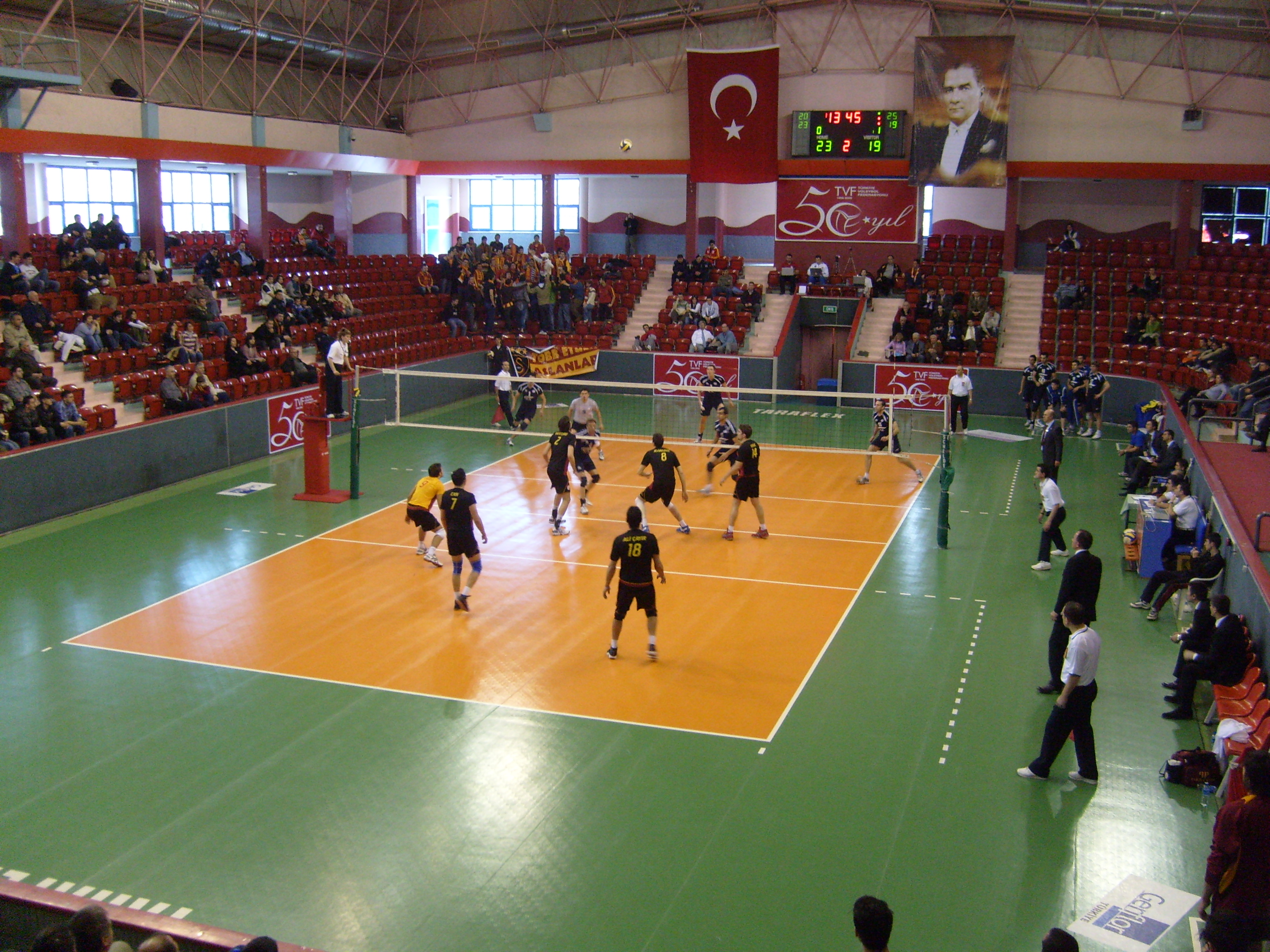
A volleyball match in Selim Sırrı Tarcan Sport Hall
