= Alara Altundağ =

Turkish volleyball player

Alara Altundağ (born June 5, 1994) is a Turkish volleyball player who plays as a spiker for Beşiktaş in the Sultans League. Previously, she played for PTT, Keçiören Belediyesi Bağlum Spor, Mert Grup Sigorta, Çukurova Belediyespor and Karayolları.

== Career ==
- (Turkey) PTT (2018-19)
- (Turkey) Keçiören Belediyesi Bağlum Spor (2019-20)
- (Turkey) Mert Grup Sigorta (2020-22)
- (Turkey) Çukurova Belediyespor (2022-23)
- (Turkey) Karayolları (2023-24)
- (Turkey) Beşiktaş (2024-present)
