= Yağmur Koçyiğit =

Turkish volleyball player (born 1988)

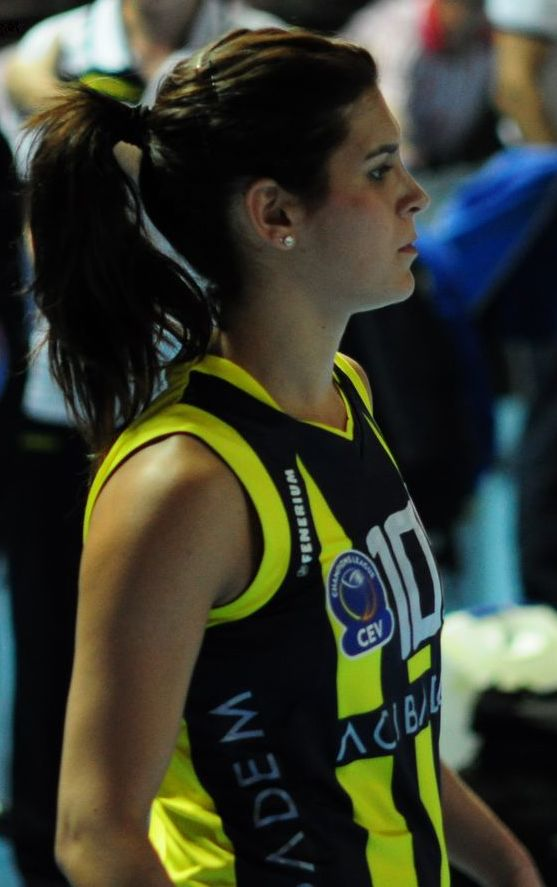

Personal information
- Full name: Yağmur Koçyiğit
- Born: September 7, 1988 (age 38) Istanbul, Turkey
- Height: 1.85 m (6 ft 1 in)
- Weight: 71 kg (157 lb)

Volleyball information
- Position: Outside hitter
- Current club: Fenerbahçe S.K.
- Number: 10

National team
- Years: Team
- –: Turkey youth

Yağmur Koçyiğit (born September 7, 1988) is a Turkish volleyball player. She stands 185 cm (6 ft 1 in) tall and plays as an outside hitter. She plays for Fenerbahçe and signed a three-year contract with the team in July 2010. She has also played for Jamper Aguere from Spain, as well as Turkey's Eczacıbaşı Zentiva and Beşiktaş.

Koçyiğit won the bronze medal at the 2010–11 CEV Champions League with Fenerbahçe.

== Awards ==
=== Clubs ===
- 2010 Turkish Super Cup – Champion, with Fenerbahçe
- 2010 FIVB World Club Championship – Champion, with Fenerbahçe
- 2010–11 CEV Champions League - Bronze medal, with Fenerbahçe
- 2010–11 Aroma Women's Volleyball League – Champion, with Fenerbahçe
- 2011–12 CEV Champions League – Champion, with Fenerbahçe

== See also ==
- Turkish women in sports
