= Ereğli Belediye =

Ereğli Belediyesi Spor Kulübü
- Full name: Ereğli Belediyesi Spor Kulübü
- Short name: Ereğli Belediyesi
- Founded: 2002
- Ground: Ereğli Atatürk Spor Salonu
- Manager: Mustafa Çayır
- League: Turkish Women's Volleyball League
- 2012-13: 10
- Website: Club home page

Ereğli Belediyesi Spor Kulübü is the women's volleyball club based in Konya, Turkey.

== Current squad ==
Number	Player	Position
1	(Turkey) Merve Eskikaya	Outside hitter
2	(Turkey) Derya Kalabulut	Setter
5	(Ukraine) Antonina Kryvobogova	Outside hitter
7	(Turkey) Zülfiye Gündoğdu	Setter
8	(Turkey) Ayça Naz İhtiyaroğlu	Libero
9	(Turkey) Deniz Çetinsaraç	Outside hitter
10	(Czech Republic) Šárka Barborková	Outside hitter
11	(United States) Diane Elizabeth Copenhagen	Outside hitter
12	(Turkey) Aslı Türker	Middle blocker
14	(Turkey) Sibel Küçük	Outside hitter
15	(Turkey) Müge Kurt	Middle blocker
16	(Turkey) Cemre Erol	Outside hitter
17	(Turkey) Gözde Dal	Middle blocker
18	(Turkey) Bahar Bakırcıoğlu	Outside hitter

== See also ==
- See also Turkey women's national volleyball team
