= Ayça Naz İhtiyaroğlu =

Turkish volleyball player (born 1984)

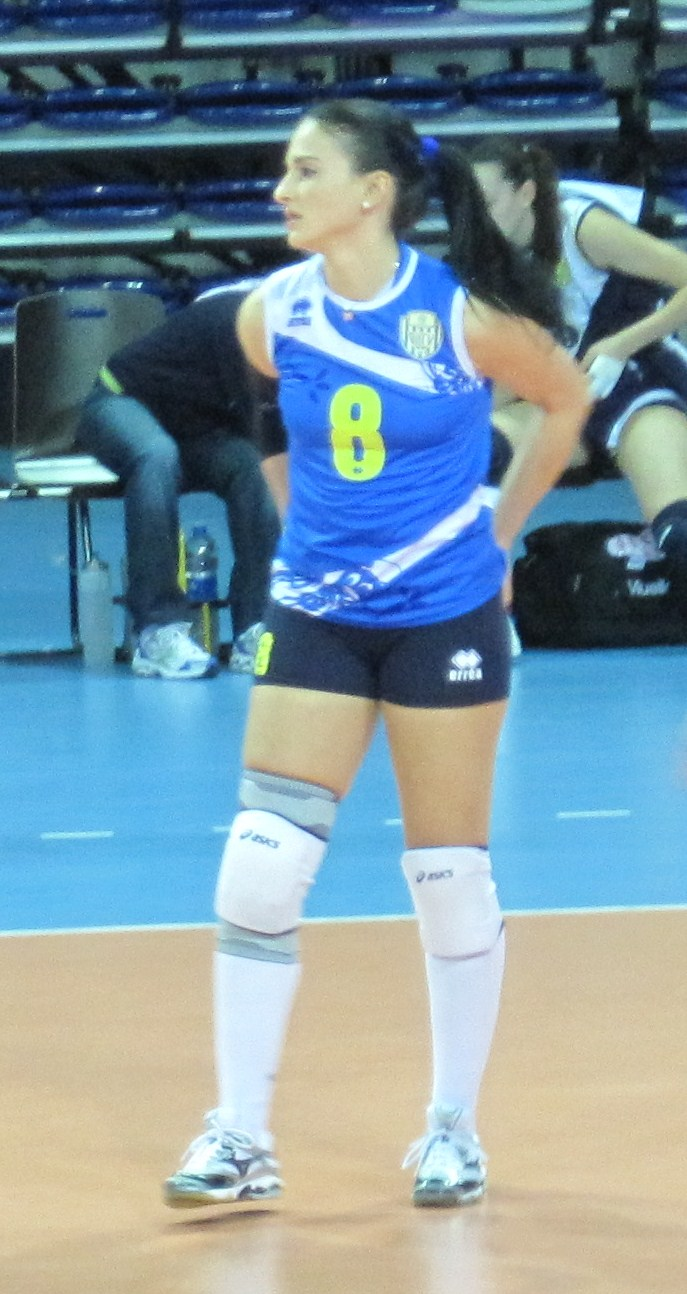

Personal information
- Born: August 13, 1984 (age 40); Istanbul, Turkey
- Height: 169 cm (5 ft 7 in)

Ayça Naz İhtiyaroğlu (born August 13, 1984) is a Turkish volleyball player. She is 169 cm tall and plays as libero. She has been playing for Galatasaray Women's Volleyball Team since the 2009 season and wears number 8. She has played 53 times for the national team. She has also played for Yeşilyurt and Fenerbahçe Acıbadem.

İhtiyaroğlu is engaged to Fenerbahçe S.K. captain Arslan Ekşi.

== See also ==
- Turkish women in sports
