= Marina Tumas =

Belarusian volleyball player (born 1981)

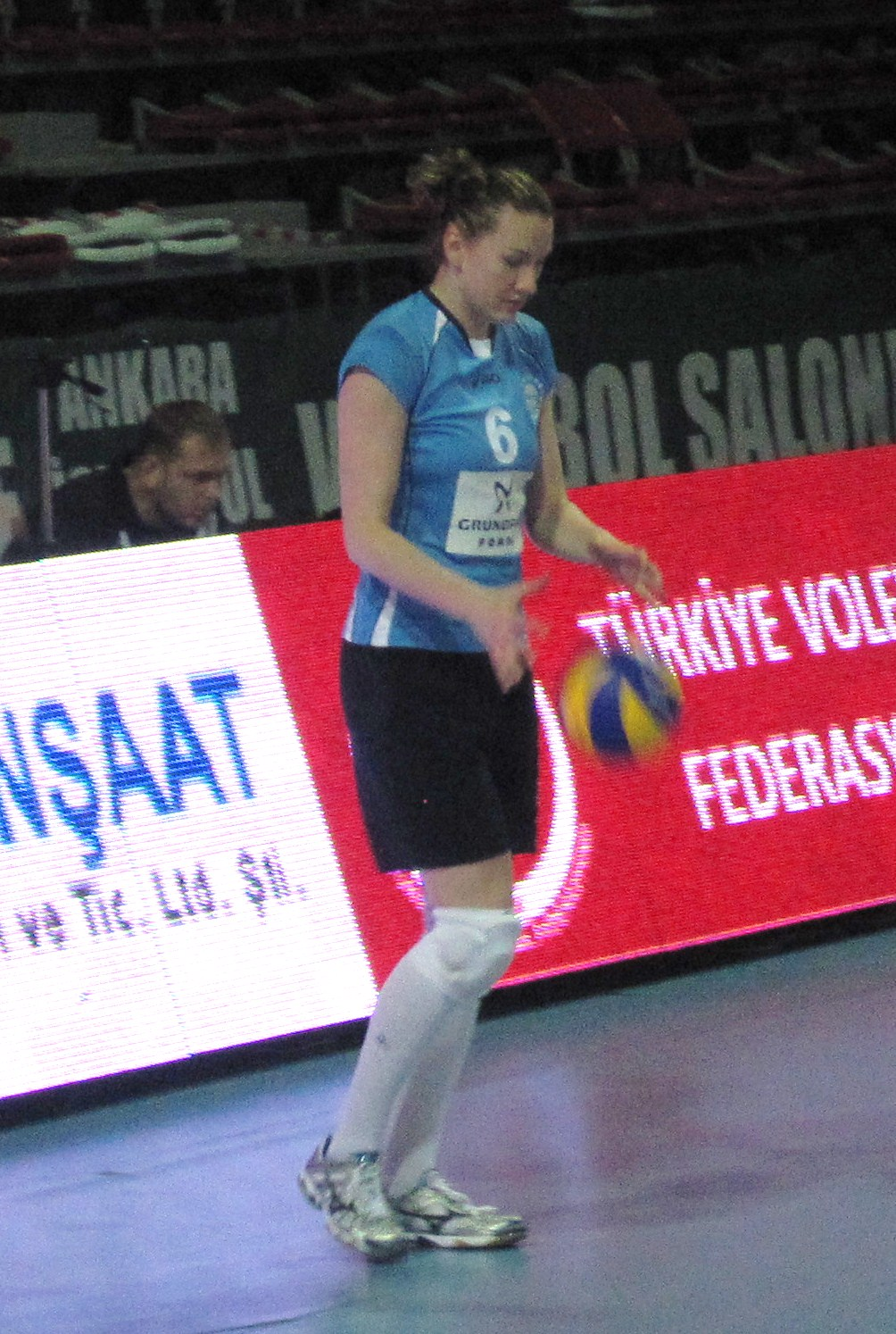

Personal information
- Nationality: Belarusian
- Born: 17 September 1984 (age 42)
- Height: 188 cm (74 in)

Volleyball information
- Position: opposite
- Current club: Minchanka VC

National team
2001—	Belarus

Marina Tumas (Belarusian: Марына Тумас; Russian: Марина Тумас; born September 17, 1984) is a Belarusian volleyball player. She is 188 cm. She plays for İller Bankası Team in Turkey.
