= Zülfiye Gündoğdu =

Turkish volleyball player (born 1982)

Personal information
- Full name: Zülfiye Gündoğdu
- Born: December 30, 1982 (age 43) Ankara, Turkey
- Height: 1.74 m (5 ft 8 1/2 in)
- Weight: 63 kg (139 lb)

Volleyball information
- Position: Setter
- Current club: Beşiktaş
- Number: 15

Career
- Years: Team
- 2011-present: Beşiktaş

National team
- Years: Team
- –: Turkey youth

Zülfiye Gündoğdu (born December 30, 1982, in Ankara) is a Turkish volleyball player. She is 174 cm and plays as setter. She plays for Beşiktaş. She signed with the team on 5 July 2011. She has also played for Ankara Karayolları, İller Bankası, Ankara TED Koleji, Gazi Üniversitesi, Yalovaspor, Polisan Değirmendere, Nilüfer Belediyesi, Fenerbahçe Acıbadem and she played 20 times for Turkish Women's Beach Volley Team.

== Awards ==
=== Clubs ===
- 2010 Turkish Super Cup - Champion, with Fenerbahçe Acıbadem
- 2010 FIVB World Club Championship - Champion, with Fenerbahçe Acıbadem
- 2010-11 CEV Champions League - Bronze medal, with Fenerbahçe Acıbadem
- 2010-11 Aroma Women's Volleyball League - Champion, with Fenerbahçe Acıbadem

== See also ==
- Turkish women in sports
