= 2023–24 Galatasaray S.K. (women's volleyball) season =

Galatasaray Daikin
2023–24 season
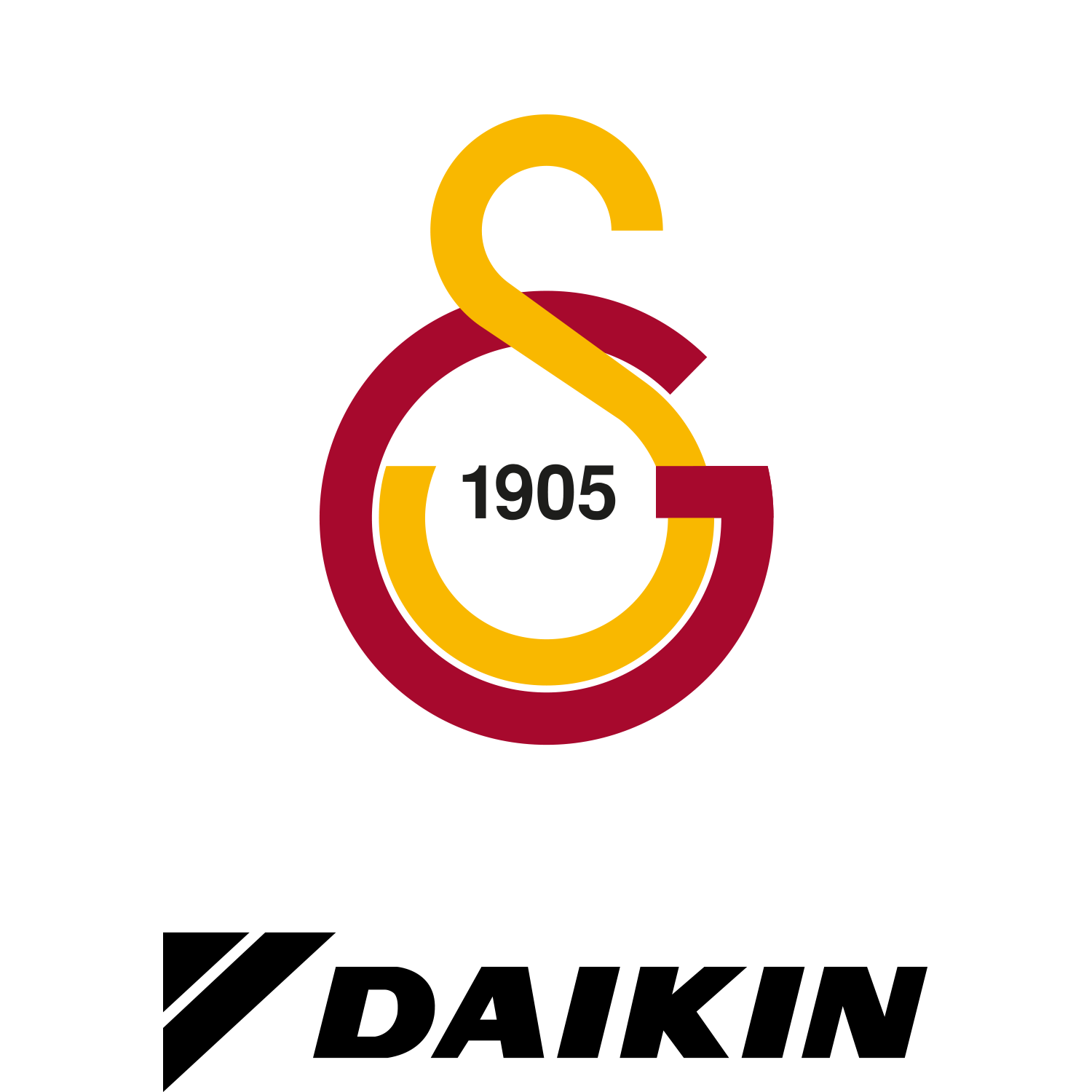
- President: Dursun Özbek
- Head coach: Guillermo Naranjo Hernández
- Arena: TVF Burhan Felek Sport Hall
- Turkish Women's Volleyball League: 6th seed
- Playoffs: 6th
- Turkish Women's Volleyball Cup: Group Stage
- BVA Cup: Champions
- CEV Women's Challenge Cup: 8th finals

It is the 2023–24 season of the Women's Volleyball team of Galatasaray Sports Club.

== Overview ==
=== June ===
- On 19 June, Guillermo Naranjo Hernández was appointed as the head coach of the Galatasaray women's volleyball team. It was announced that a 2-year contract was signed with the Spanish coach.

=== July ===
- On 19 July, Galatasaray women's volleyball team will compete in the BVA Cup. If Galatasaray becomes the champion, they will qualify for the CEV Challenge Cup.

=== August ===
- On 10 August, Galatasaray's new team captain is libero Bihter Dumanoğlu.
- On 14 August, Galatasaray Women's Volleyball Team 2023–24 Season Turkish Women's Volleyball League fixture has been announced.
- On 14 August, Galatasaray Women's Volleyball Team will compete in the 2023–24 Season Turkish Women's Volleyball Cup, the groups have been determined.
- On 21 August, It was announced that young libero İrem Nur Özsoy ruptured her anterior cruciate ligaments after the injury she suffered in training.

=== September ===
- On 14 September, Neşve Büyükbayram was appointed as assistant administrative manager.
- On 14 September, İsmail Çağrı Akdoğan was appointed as assistant coach.
- On 14 September, Ioannis Paraschidis was appointed as the conditioning coach.
- On 18 September, The match schedule of Galatasaray Women's Volleyball Team in the BVA Cup to be held in Kosovo has been announced.
- On 21 September, Galatasaray became the Undefeated Balkan Cup Champion.

=== October ===
- On 1 October, The match schedule of Group B, in which Galatasaray will also take part in the group stage of the Turkish Women's Volleyball Cup, which will be hosted by İzmir and Bursa, has been announced.

=== November ===
- On 2 November, It was learned that Emine Arıcı suffered from plantar fasciitis and suffered a fracture in the heel of her right foot due to the rupture. It is estimated that Arıcı will not be on the field for approximately two months.

== Sponsorship and kit manufacturers ==
- Supplier: Umbro
- Name sponsor: Daikin
- Main sponsor: HDI Sigorta
- Back sponsor: Hammer Jack, Tunç Holding
- Sleeve sponsor: —
- Lateral sponsor: GSMobile
- Short sponsor: AKSA, Kayakapı Premium Caves - Cappadocia
- Socks sponsor: —

== Technical Staff ==
As of 5 October 2023

Name	Job
(Turkey) Neslihan Turan	Volleyball Teams Administrative Manager
(Turkey) Neşve Büyükbayram	Assistant Administrative Manager
(Turkey) Asuman Baş	Team Manager
(Spain) Guillermo Naranjo Hernández	Head Coach
(Turkey) İsmail Çağrı Akdoğan	Assistant Coach
(Turkey) Emre Türkileri	Assistant Coach
(Greece) Ioannis Paraschidis	Conditioner
(Turkey) Uğur Şimşek	Statistics Coach
(Turkey) Dinçer Kaya	Physiotherapist
(Turkey) Murat Beder	Masseur

== Team roster ==
As of 10 February 2024

No.	Player	Position	Date of Birth	Height (m)	Country
1	Selen Ursavaş	Libero	15 April 2000 (age 26)	1.60	Turkey
2	İlkin Aydın	Outside Hitter	5 January 2000 (age 26)	1.83	Turkey
3	Kanami Tashiro	Setter	25 March 1991 (age 35)	1.73	Japan
6	Sude Hacımustafaoğlu	Outside Hitter	25 March 2002 (age 24)	1.80	Turkey
7	Fatma Beyaz	Middle-blocker	16 April 1995 (age 31)	1.86	Turkey
8	Elifsu Eriçek	Outside Hitter	16 December 2002 (age 23)	1.80	Turkey
9	Emine Arıcı	Middle-blocker	17 January 1997 (age 29)	1.92	Turkey
10	Ayçin Akyol	Middle-blocker	15 June 1999 (age 27)	1.88	Turkey
11	Melisa Sazalan	Outside Hitter	29 September 2006 (age 19)	1.85	Turkey
12	Bihter Dumanoğlu (c)	Libero	3 February 1995 (age 31)	1.75	Turkey
14	Özge Arslanalp	Setter	28 January 2004 (age 22)	1.73	Turkey
17	Yağmur Karaoğlu	Opposite	21 August 2001 (age 24)	1.90	Turkey
18	Duygu Düzceler	Setter	6 April 1990 (age 36)	1.78	Turkey
20	Danielle Cuttino	Opposite	22 June 1996 (age 29)	1.94	United States
22	Heather Gneiting	Middle-blocker	12 May 2000 (age 26)	1.98	United States
24	Katarina Lazović	Outside Hitter	12 September 1999 (age 26)	1.82	Serbia
33	Logan Eggleston	Outside Hitter	13 November 2000 (age 25)	1.85	United States
77	Arzum Tezcan	Setter	6 April 1998 (age 28)	1.86	Turkey
–	İrem Nur Özsoy	Libero	13 June 2003 (age 23)	1.70	Turkey

== Transfers ==
=== In ===
Date	Player	Transferred from	Fee	Source
20 June 2023	(United States) Danielle Cuttino	(Japan) Toyota Auto Body Queenseis	Free	
22 June 2023	(Japan) Kanami Tashiro	(France) Neptunes de Nantes Volley-Ball	Free	
6 July 2023	(United States) Heather Gneiting	(United States) Brigham Young University	Free	
6 July 2023	(Turkey) Yağmur Karaoğlu	(Hungary) Fatum Nyíregyháza	Free	
8 July 2023	(Turkey) Duygu Düzceler	(Turkey) Çukurova Belediyesi Adana Demirspor	Free	
8 July 2023	(Turkey) Fatma Beyaz	(Turkey) Adam Voleybol	Free	
9 August 2023	(Turkey) Melisa Sazalan	Youth system	N/A	
12 September 2023	(Turkey) Selen Ursavaş	(Turkey) İlbank	Free	
14 September 2023	(Turkey) Elif Su Eriçek	(Turkey) Çukurova Belediyesi Adana Demirspor	Free	
29 November 2023	(Turkey) Arzum Tezcan	(Turkey) İstanbul Büyükşehir Belediyesi Spor Kulübü	Undisclosed	
6 January 2024	(Russia) Polina Shemanova	(United States) Syracuse University	Undisclosed	
10 February 2024	(Serbia) Katarina Lazović	(China) Beijing BAIC Motor	Undisclosed	

=== Out ===
Date	Player	Transferred to	Fee	Source
22 May 2023	(Serbia) Mina Popović	(Russia) Lokomotiv Kaliningrad	End of contract	
26 May 2023	(Turkey) Fulden Ural	(Turkey) Beşiktaş Ayos	End of contract	
3 June 2023	(Turkey) Gamze Alikaya	(Turkey) Kuzeyboru	End of contract	
4 June 2023	(Greece) Anthí Vasilantonáki	(Turkey) Türk Hava Yolları Spor Kulübü	End of contract	
5 June 2023	(Turkey) Beren Yeşilırmak	(Turkey) Çukurova Belediyesi Adana Demirspor	Undisclosed	
6 June 2023	(Turkey) Nazlı Eda Kafkas	(Turkey) Nilüfer Belediyespor	End of contract	
7 June 2023	(Turkey) Karmen Aksoy	(Turkey) VakıfBank	End of contract	
31 January 2024	(Russia) Polina Shemanova	(Turkey) Sarıyer Belediyesi Spor Kulübü	Undisclosed	

=== Contracts renewals ===
Date	Player	Contract length	Source
20 June 2023	(Turkey) Bihter Dumanoğlu	2-year	
21 June 2023	(Turkey) Sude Hacımustafaoğlu	2-year + 1-year	
22 June 2023	(Turkey) İrem Nur Özsoy	2-year	
8 July 2023	(United States) Logan Eggleston	1-year	
26 December 2023	(Turkey) İlkin Aydın	2-year	
26 January 2024	(Turkey) Ayçin Akyol	2-year	

== Pre-season and friendlies ==
Date	Time		Score		Set 1	Set 2	Set 3	Set 4	Set 5	Total	Report
9 September 2023	–	Beşiktaş Ayos	3–1	Galatasaray Daikin	25–15	18–25	25–20	25–18	–	93–78	Report 1 Report 2
14 September 2023	–	Galatasaray Daikin	3–1	Aydın Büyükşehir Belediyespor	25–23	25–22	24–26	25–11	–	99–82	Report

== Competitions ==
=== Turkish Women's Volleyball League ===
==== League table ====
Pos	Team	Pld	W	L	Pts	SW	SL	SR	SPW	SPL	SPR	Qualification or relegation
1	Fenerbahçe Opet	26	24	2	73	76	16	4.750	2224	1793	1.240	Play-off (1st-4th)
2	VakıfBank	27	25	2	72	74	21	3.524	2284	1944	1.175	Play-off (1st-4th)
3	Eczacıbaşı Dynavit	26	23	3	68	71	17	4.176	2133	1768	1.206	Play-off (1st-4th)
4	Türk Hava Yolları	26	19	7	54	62	33	1.879	2249	2001	1.124	Play-off (1st-4th)
5	Kuzeyboru	26	17	9	46	58	42	1.381	2227	2119	1.051	Play-off (5th-8th)
6	Galatasaray Daikin	26	14	12	40	50	48	1.042	2152	2084	1.033	Play-off (5th-8th)
7	Nilüfer Belediyespor	26	12	14	34	45	55	0.818	2121	2232	0.950	Play-off (5th-8th)
8	Muratpaşa Belediyesi SigortaShop	26	11	15	32	44	55	0.800	2137	2202	0.970	Play-off (5th-8th)
9	Beşiktaş Ayos	26	9	17	28	39	60	0.650	2101	2228	0.943	
10	Aydın Büyükşehir Belediyespor	26	8	18	28	43	63	0.683	2259	2378	0.950	
11	Çukurova Belediyespor	26	8	18	26	40	62	0.645	2171	2311	0.939	
12	Sarıyer Belediyespor	26	6	20	21	33	64	0.516	1939	2194	0.884	
13	PTT	26	6	20	20	29	67	0.433	1949	2215	0.880	Relegation
14	Karayolları	26	1	25	7	15	76	0.197	1718	2195	0.783	Relegation

Source: TVF
Rules for classification: 1) Games won 2) Points 3) Set ratio 4) Setpoint ratio

==== Regular season (1st Half) ====
- All times are Europe Time (UTC+03:00).

Date	Time		Score		Set 1	Set 2	Set 3	Set 4	Set 5	Total	Report
15 October 2023	15:00	Nilüfer Belediyespor	3–2	Galatasaray Daikin	25–20	22–25	25–20	18–25	15–13	105–103	Report 1 Report 2
24 October 2023	17:00	Galatasaray Daikin	3–2	Sarıyer Belediyesi Spor Kulübü	27–29	25–16	22–25	25–22	15–12	114–104	Report 1 Report 2
21 October 2023	14:00	VakıfBank Spor Kulübü	3–0	Galatasaray Daikin	25–12	25–15	25–16	–	–	75–43	Report 1 Report 2
28 October 2023	14:00	Galatasaray Daikin	3–0	PTT Spor Kulübü	25–23	25–16	25–20	–	–	75–59	Report 1 Report 2
31 October 2023	15:30	Türk Hava Yolları Spor Kulübü	3–1	Galatasaray Daikin	25–18	23–25	25–23	25–15	–	98–81	Report 1 Report 2
4 November 2023	13:00	Galatasaray Daikin	1–3	Fenerbahçe Opet	24–26	25–19	19–25	22–25	–	90–95	Report 1 Report 2
12 November 2023	15:00	Aydın Büyükşehir Belediyespor	3–2	Galatasaray Daikin	25–23	18–25	25–16	23–25	16–14	107–103	Report 1 Report 2
19 November 2023	18:00	Galatasaray Daikin	0–3	Eczacıbaşı Dynavit	16–25	12–25	18–25	–	–	46–75	Report 1 Report 2
22 November 2023	18:00	Kuzeyboru	3–0	Galatasaray Daikin	25–23	25–20	25–16	–	–	75–59	Report 1 Report 2
25 November 2023	16:00	Galatasaray Daikin	3–1	Karayolları Spor Kulübü	23–25	25–13	25–22	25–15	–	98–75	Report 1 Report 2
3 December 2023	19:00	Beşiktaş Ayos	1–3	Galatasaray Daikin	25–16	22–25	19–25	12–25	–	78–91	Report 1 Report 2
9 December 2023	17:00	Galatasaray Daikin	3–2	Çukurova Belediye Adana Demirspor	23–25	19–25	25–18	25–17	15–8	107–93	Report 1 Report 2
16 December 2023	14:00	Galatasaray Daikin	3–2	Muratpaşa Belediyesi Sigorta Shop	25–21	26–24	23–25	27–29	15–11	116–110	Report 1 Report 2

==== Regular season (2nd Half) ====
- All times are Europe Time (UTC+03:00).

Date	Time		Score		Set 1	Set 2	Set 3	Set 4	Set 5	Total	Report
7 January 2024	16:00	Galatasaray Daikin	3–0	Nilüfer Belediyespor	25–22	25–9	25–19	–	–	75–50	Report 1 Report 2
14 January 2024	17:00	Sarıyer Belediyesi Spor Kulübü	0–3	Galatasaray Daikin	15–25	17–25	11–25	–	–	43–75	Report 1 Report 2
21 January 2024	17:00	Galatasaray Daikin	0–3	VakıfBank Spor Kulübü	16–25	20–25	22–25	–	–	58–75	Report 1 Report 2
24 January 2024	17:00	PTT Spor Kulübü	0–3	Galatasaray Daikin	14–25	18–25	29–31	–	–	61–81	Report 1 Report 2
28 January 2024	18:00	Galatasaray Daikin	0–3	Türk Hava Yolları Spor Kulübü	21–25	17–25	16–25	–	–	54–75	Report 1 Report 2
4 February 2024	17:30	Fenerbahçe Opet	3–0	Galatasaray Daikin	25–20	25–18	25–20	–	–	75–58	Report 1 Report 2
11 February 2024	13:00	Galatasaray Daikin	3–2	Aydın Büyükşehir Belediyespor	25–18	22–25	25–22	20–25	16–14	108–104	Report 1 Report 2
17 February 2024	18:30	Eczacıbaşı Dynavit	3–0	Galatasaray Daikin	25–21	28–26	25–21	–	–	78–68	Report 1 Report 2
25 February 2024	13:30	Galatasaray Daikin	2–3	Kuzeyboru	23–25	18–25	25–15	25–20	9–15	100–100	Report 1 Report 2
3 March 2024	14:00	Karayolları Spor Kulübü	0–3	Galatasaray Daikin	19–25	26–28	20–25	–	–	65–78	Report 1 Report 2
6 March 2024	17:00	Galatasaray Daikin	3–2	Beşiktaş Ayos	24–26	30–32	25–20	25–17	15–13	119–108	Report 1 Report 2
10 March 2024	14:00	Çukurova Belediye Adana Demirspor	0–3	Galatasaray Daikin	15–25	19–25	13–25	–	–	47–75	Report 1 Report 2
17 March 2024	14:00	Muratpaşa Belediyesi Sigorta Shop	0–3	Galatasaray Daikin	25–27	13–25	16–25	–	–	54–77	Report 1 Report 2

==== Playoffs ====
===== 5–8th place =====
- All times are Europe Time (UTC+03:00).

Date	Time		Score		Set 1	Set 2	Set 3	Set 4	Set 5	Total	Report
2 April 2024	17:00	Nilüfer Belediyespor	0–3	Galatasaray Daikin	23–25	15–25	22–25	–	–	60–75	Report 1 Report 2
5 April 2024	17:00	Galatasaray Daikin	3–1	Nilüfer Belediyespor	19–25	25–21	25–14	25–20	–	94–80	Report 1 Report 2

===== 5–6th place =====
- All times are Europe Time (UTC+03:00).

Date	Time		Score		Set 1	Set 2	Set 3	Set 4	Set 5	Total	Report
10 April 2024	15:00	Galatasaray Daikin	2–3	Kuzeyboru	25–23	19–25	19–25	25–20	7–15	95–108	Report 1 Report 2
13 April 2024	14:00	Kuzeyboru	2–3	Galatasaray Daikin	25–17	25–22	19–25	20–25	13–15	102–104	Report 1 Report 2
15 April 2024	16:00	Kuzeyboru	3–1	Galatasaray Daikin	25–18	24–26	25–16	25–19	–	99–79	Report 1 Report 2

=== Turkish Women's Volleyball Cup ===
==== Group B ====
Pos	Team	Pld	W	L	Pts	SW	SL	SR	SPW	SPL	SPR
1	Çukurova Belediye Adana Demirspor	2	1	1	4	5	3	1.667	163	161	1.012
2	Muratpaşa Belediyesi Sigorta Shop	2	1	1	3	5	5	1.000	217	196	1.107
3	Galatasaray Daikin	2	1	1	2	3	5	0.600	156	179	0.872

Source: 2023-2024 Kadınlar Kupa Voley

===== Results =====
- All times are Europe Time (UTC+03:00).

Date	Time		Score		Set 1	Set 2	Set 3	Set 4	Set 5	Total	Report
1 October 2023	18:00	Muratpaşa Belediyesi Sigorta Shop	2–3	Galatasaray Daikin	22–25	22–25	25–20	25–23	10–15	104–108	Report 1 Report 2
2 October 2023	19:00	Galatasaray Daikin	0–3	Çukurova Belediye Adana Demirspor	17–25	12–25	19–25	–	–	48–75	Report 1 Report 2

=== BVA Cup ===
==== Results ====
- All times are Europe Time (UTC+03:00).

Date	Time		Score		Set 1	Set 2	Set 3	Set 4	Set 5	Total	Report
19 September 2023	18:30	Galatasaray Daikin (Turkey)	3–0	(Albania) SK Skenderbeu	25–16	25–9	25–9	–	–	75–34	Report 1 Report 2
20 September 2023	18:30	AO Markopoulous (Greece)	0–3	(Turkey) Galatasaray Daikin	23–25	13–25	23–25	–	–	59–75	Report 1 Report 2
21 September 2023	21:00	KV Drita (Kosovo)	0–3	(Turkey) Galatasaray Daikin	11–25	21–25	14–25	–	–	46–75	Report 1 Report 2

=== CEV Challenge Cup ===
==== 32nd finals ====
- All times are Europe Time (UTC+03:00).

Date	Time		Score		Set 1	Set 2	Set 3	Set 4	Set 5	Total	Report
10 October 2023	20:00	Galatasaray Daikin (Turkey)	3–0	(Portugal) Kairos Ponta Delgada	25–17	25–11	25–20	–	–	75–48	Report 1 Report 2
18 October 2023	23:30	Kairos Ponta Delgada (Portugal)	0–3	(Turkey) Galatasaray Daikin	19–25	18–25	17–25	–	–	54–75	Report 1 Report 2

==== 16th finals ====
- All times are Europe Time (UTC+03:00).

Date	Time		Score		Set 1	Set 2	Set 3	Set 4	Set 5	Total	Report
9 November 2023	19:30	Hämeenlinnan LR (Finland)	0–3	(Turkey) Galatasaray Daikin	14–25	18–25	13–25	–	–	45–75	Report 1 Report 2
16 November 2023	20:00	Galatasaray Daikin (Turkey)	3–0	(Finland) Hämeenlinnan LR	25–14	25–15	25–14	–	–	75–43	Report 1 Report 2

==== 8th finals ====
- All times are Europe Time (UTC+03:00).

Date	Time		Score		Set 1	Set 2	Set 3	Set 4	Set 5	Total	Report
30 November 2023	20:30	Galatasaray Daikin (Turkey)	2–3	(Germany) VC Wiesbaden	22–25	16–25	27–25	25–21	13–15	103–111	Report 1 Report 2
6 December 2023	21:30	VC Wiesbaden (Germany)	2–3	(Turkey) Galatasaray Daikin	20–25	25–22	25–21	18–25	14–16	102–109	Report 1 Report 2
Golden set		VC Wiesbaden (Germany)	15–11	(Turkey) Galatasaray Daikin							
