= 2024–25 Galatasaray S.K. (women's volleyball) season =

Galatasaray Daikin
2024–25 season
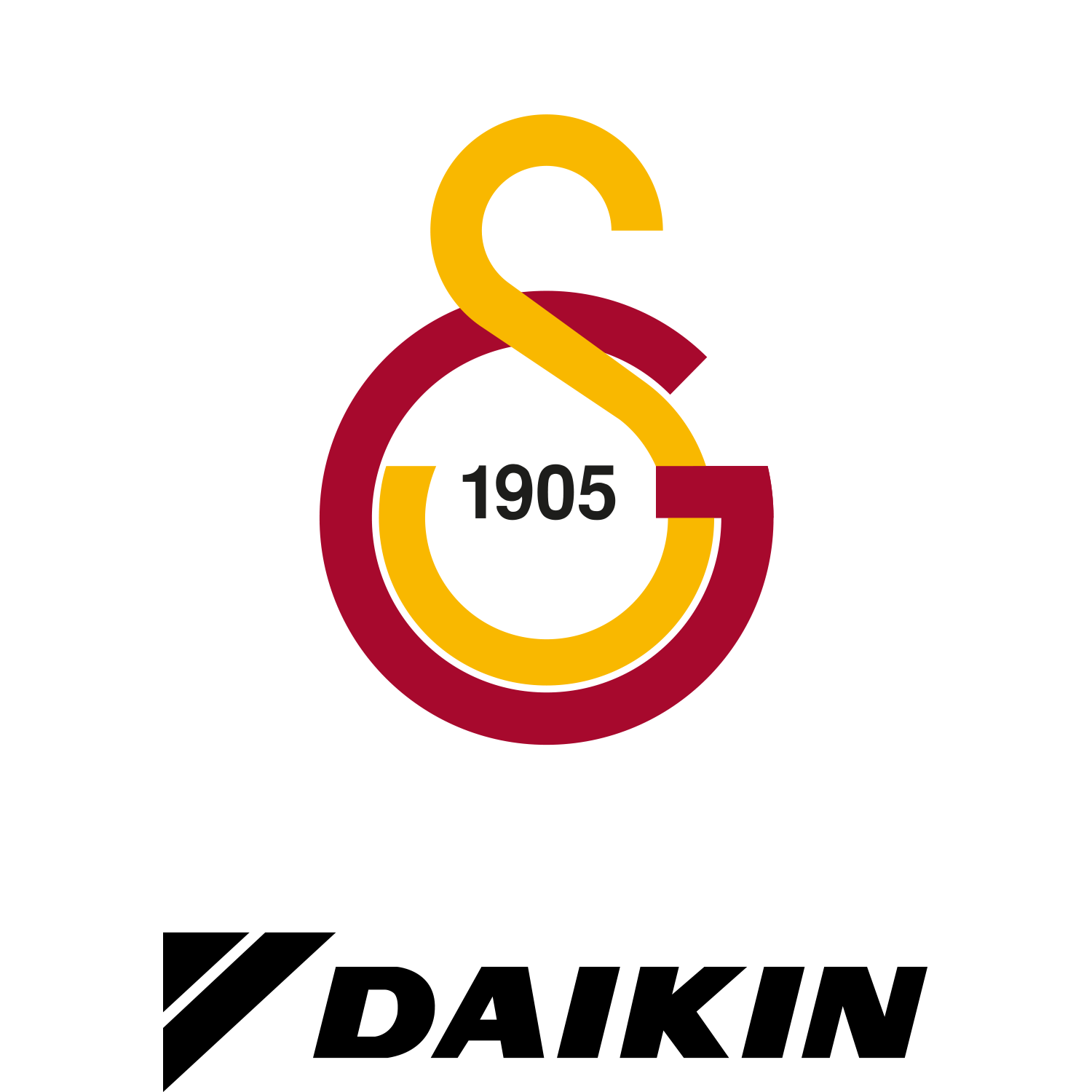
- President: Dursun Özbek
- Head coach: Alberto Bigarelli
- Arena: TVF Burhan Felek Sport Hall
- Turkish Women's Volleyball League: 4th seed
- Playoffs: 4th
- Turkish Women's Volleyball Cup: Quarter-finals
- BVA Cup: Champions
- CEV Women's Challenge Cup: Semi-finals

It is the 2024–25 season of the Women's Volleyball team of Galatasaray Sports Club.

== Season overview ==
=== Pre-season ===
On 30 April, Asuman Baş, who has been the team manager for 2 seasons, was given a plaque of appreciation for her efforts and bid farewell.

On 3 May, Neşve Büyükbayram was appointed as Team Manager.

On 1 August, The 2024–25 Volleyball Season fixtures in the Sultanlar Ligi have been announced.

On 8 August, Adnan Mert Paşaoğlu was appointed as assistant coach.

On 23 August, Galatasaray Daikin's BVA Cup program has been announced. Galatasaray Women's Volleyball Team will play as the home team in the BVA Cup to be held in Istanbul.

On 5 September, Galatasaray Daikin's captain in the new season will be İlkin Aydın.

On 30 December, Galatasaray Daikin parted ways with head coach Guillermo Naranjo Hernández.

On 31 December, Alberto Bigarelli was appointed as the head coach of Galatasaray Daikin Women's Volleyball Team.

== Sponsorship and kit manufacturers ==
- Supplier: Puma
- Name sponsor: Daikin
- Main sponsor: Daikin
- Back sponsor: Başak Traktör
- Sleeve sponsor: —
- Lateral sponsor: HDI Sigorta
- Short sponsor: Tacirler, Kayakapı Premium Caves - Cappadocia, AKSA
- Socks sponsor: —

== Technical Staff ==
As of 1 January 2025

Name	Job
(Turkey) Neslihan Turan	Administrative Manager
(Turkey) Neşve Büyükbayram	Team Manager
(Italy) Alberto Bigarelli	Head Coach
(Turkey) Adnan Mert Paşaoğlu	Assistant Coach
(Turkey) Emre Türkileri	Assistant Coach
(Greece) Ioannis Paraschidis	Conditioner
(Turkey) Uğur Şimşek	Statistics Coach
(Turkey) Dinçer Kaya	Physiotherapist
(Turkey) Murat Beder	Masseur

=== Staff changes ===
Change	Date	Staff member	Staff position	Ref.
Out	30 December 2024	(Spain) Guillermo Naranjo Hernández	Head Coach	
In	31 December 2024	(Italy) Alberto Bigarelli	Head Coach	

== Team roster ==
As of 10 September 2024

No.	Player	Position	Date of Birth	Height (m)	Country
2	İlkin Aydın (c)	Outside Hitter	5 January 2000 (age 26)	1.83	Turkey
4	Britt Bongaerts	Setter	3 November 1996 (age 29)	1.85	Netherlands
5	Eylül Akarçeşme	Libero	1 October 1999 (age 26)	1.70	Turkey
6	Sude Hacımustafaoğlu	Outside Hitter	25 March 2002 (age 24)	1.80	Turkey
7	Ceylan Arısan	Middle-blocker	1 January 1994 (age 32)	1.90	Turkey
8	Yasemin Güveli	Middle-blocker	5 January 1999 (age 27)	1.90	Turkey
9	Eline Timmerman	Middle-blocker	30 December 1998 (age 27)	1.92	Netherlands
10	Ayçin Akyol	Middle-blocker	15 June 1999 (age 27)	1.88	Turkey
11	Aslıhan Kılıç	Setter	21 April 1998 (age 28)	1.80	Turkey
12	Bihter Dumanoğlu	Libero	3 February 1995 (age 31)	1.75	Turkey
14	Alexia Căruțașu	Opposite	10 June 2003 (age 23)	1.88	Romania / Turkey
16	Yasemin Özel	Opposite	13 May 1998 (age 28)	1.85	Turkey
24	Katarina Lazović	Outside Hitter	12 September 1999 (age 26)	1.82	Serbia
27	Ana Kalandadze	Outside Hitter	10 December 1998 (age 27)	1.86	Georgia

== Transfers ==
=== Contract extensions ===
Date	Player	Contract length	Source
12 June 2024	(Turkey) Bihter Dumanoğlu	1-year	
12 June 2024	(Turkey) Sude Hacımustafaoğlu	1-year + 1-year	
13 June 2024	(Serbia) Katarina Lazović	1-year	
17 January 2025	(Netherlands) Britt Bongaerts	2-year	
21 January 2025	(Turkey) Eylül Akarçeşme	1-year	

=== Transfers in ===
Date	Player	Transferred from	Fee	Source
13 May 2024	(Romania) (Turkey) Alexia Căruțașu	(Turkey) VakıfBank	Free	
14 May 2024	(Turkey) Yasemin Güveli	(Turkey) Çukurova Belediyesi Spor Kulübü	Free	
15 May 2024	(Turkey) Yasemin Özel	(Turkey) PTT Spor Kulübü	Free	
16 May 2024	(Turkey) Aslıhan Kılıç	(Turkey) Muratpaşa Belediyesi Sigorta Shop	Free	
17 May 2024	(Turkey) Eylül Akarçeşme	(Turkey) Nilüfer Belediyespor	Free	
17 June 2024	(Netherlands) Eline Timmerman	(Germany) Allianz MTV Stuttgart	Free	
18 June 2024	(Georgia (country)) Ana Kalandadze	(Poland) PGE Rysice Rzeszów	Free	
19 June 2024	(Netherlands) Britt Bongaerts	(Germany) Allianz MTV Stuttgart	Free	
7 August 2024	(Turkey) Ceylan Arısan	(Turkey) Sarıyer Belediyesi Spor Kulübü	Free	

=== Transfers out ===
Date	Player	Transferred to	Fee	Source
7 May 2024	(Japan) Kanami Tashiro	(Japan) Toray Arrows	End of contract	
7 May 2024	(Turkey) Duygu Düzceler	(Turkey) İBB Spor Kulübü	End of contract	
7 May 2024	(Turkey) Yağmur Karaoğlu	(Turkey) Yeşilyurt	End of contract	
7 May 2024	(United States) Danielle Cuttino	(United States) LOVB Atlanta	End of contract	
8 May 2024	(Turkey) Fatma Beyaz	(Turkey) Zeren Spor Kulübü	End of contract	
8 May 2024	(Turkey) Emine Arıcı	(Turkey) Türk Hava Yolları	End of contract	
8 May 2024	(Turkey) Elifsu Eriçek	(Turkey) Bolu Belediyespor	End of contract	
8 May 2024	(United States) Logan Eggleston	(United States) LOVB Austin	End of contract	
8 May 2024	(Turkey) Arzum Tezcan	(Turkey) Sarıyer Belediyesi Spor Kulübü	End of contract	

=== Loans out ===
Date	Player	Transferred to	Fee	Until	Source
3 June 2024	(Turkey) İrem Nur Özsoy	(Turkey) Aydın Büyükşehir Belediyespor	Undisclosed	End of season	
3 July 2024	(Turkey) Melisa Sazalan	(Turkey) Göztepe SK	Undisclosed	End of season	
29 July 2024	(Turkey) Selen Ursavaş	(Turkey) TED Ankara Kolejliler	Undisclosed	End of season	

== Pre-season and friendlies ==
Date	Time		Score		Set 1	Set 2	Set 3	Set 4	Set 5	Total	Report
30 August 2024	–	Galatasaray Daikin	–	Türk Hava Yolları	–	–	–	–	–	0–0	Report
4 September 2024	–	Aras Kargo	1–3	Galatasaray Daikin	12–25	15–25	21–25	15–12	–	63–87	Report
5 September 2024	–	Galatasaray Daikin	3–1	Beşiktaş	19–25	25–16	25–18	25–19	–	94–78	Report
28 September 2024	–	Galatasaray Daikin	4–0	Nilüfer Belediyespor	25–19	25–15	25–18	25–18	–	100–70	Report

== Competitions ==
=== Turkish Women's Volleyball League ===
==== League table ====
Pos	Team	Pld	W	L	Pts	SW	SL	SR	SPW	SPL	SPR	Qualification or relegation
1	Fenerbahçe Medicana	26	23	3	72	75	14	5.357	2136	1688	1.265	Play-off (1st-4th)
2	VakıfBank	26	22	4	65	70	20	3.500	2115	1760	1.202	Play-off (1st-4th)
3	Eczacıbaşı Dynavit	26	22	4	65	67	23	2.913	2136	1728	1.236	Play-off (1st-4th)
4	Galatasaray Daikin	26	19	7	59	63	30	2.100	2149	1863	1.154	Play-off (1st-4th)
5	Türk Hava Yolları	26	18	8	53	58	35	1.657	2118	1950	1.086	Play-off (5th-8th)
6	Zeren Spor	26	17	9	43	57	47	1.213	2278	2279	1.000	Play-off (5th-8th)
7	Kuzeyboru	26	14	12	42	52	45	1.156	2123	2139	0.993	Play-off (5th-8th)
8	Aydın Büyükşehir Belediyespor	26	9	17	27	39	58	0.672	2089	2200	0.950	Play-off (5th-8th)
9	Bahçelievler Belediyespor	26	9	17	26	31	58	0.534	1814	2054	0.883	
10	Beşiktaş	26	8	18	25	33	59	0.559	1958	2112	0.927	
11	Aras Kargo	26	8	18	24	37	63	0.587	2100	2255	0.931	
12	Nilüfer Belediyespor	26	5	21	20	32	66	0.485	1969	2229	0.883	
13	Keçiören Belediyesi SigortaShop	26	5	21	16	26	67	0.388	1903	2193	0.868	Relegation
14	Sarıyer Belediyespor	26	3	23	9	17	72	0.236	1718	2146	0.801	Relegation

Source: TVF
Rules for classification: 1) Games won 2) Points 3) Set ratio 4) Setpoint ratio

==== Regular season (1st Half) ====
- All times are Europe Time (UTC+03:00).

Date	Time		Score		Set 1	Set 2	Set 3	Set 4	Set 5	Total	Report
5 October 2024	13:00	Galatasaray Daikin	3–0	VakıfBank Spor Kulübü	25–21	25–22	25–15	–	–	75–58	Report 1 Report 2
12 October 2024	19:00	Aras Kargo	0–3	Galatasaray Daikin	23–25	23–25	22–25	–	–	68–75	Report 1 Report 2
19 October 2024	19:00	Galatasaray Daikin	3–0	Zeren Spor	25–20	25–22	25–13	–	–	75–55	Report 1 Report 2
22 October 2024	17:00	Sarıyer Belediyesi Spor Kulübü	0–3	Galatasaray Daikin	15–25	17–25	20–25	–	–	52–75	Report 1 Report 2
26 October 2024	13:00	Galatasaray Daikin	3–0	Bahçelievler Belediye Spor Kulübü	25–20	25–21	25–17	–	–	75–58	Report 1 Report 2
29 October 2024	17:30	Fenerbahçe Medicana	3–0	Galatasaray Daikin	25–21	25–16	25–18	–	–	75–55	Report 1 Report 2
2 November 2024	15:00	Galatasaray Daikin	2–3	Aydın Büyükşehir Belediyespor	25–15	23–25	19–25	25–18	12–15	104–98	Report 1 Report 2
9 November 2024	14:00	Türk Hava Yolları	3–2	Galatasaray Daikin	29–27	24–26	23–25	25–16	15–11	116–105	Report 1 Report 2
17 November 2024	13:00	Galatasaray Daikin	3–1	Nilüfer Belediyespor	25–17	25–11	18–25	26–24	–	94–77	Report 1 Report 2
23 November 2024	13:00	Keçiören Belediyesi Sigorta Shop	1–3	Galatasaray Daikin	15–25	25–21	19–25	22–25	–	81–96	Report 1 Report 2
1 December 2024	17:00	Galatasaray Daikin	3–0	Beşiktaş	25–13	25–23	25–22	–	–	75–58	Report 1 Report 2
6 December 2024	18:00	Eczacıbaşı Dynavit	1–3	Galatasaray Daikin	22–25	25–11	14–25	19–25	–	80–86	Report 1 Report 2
15 December 2024	17:00	Kuzeyboru	3–2	Galatasaray Daikin	21–25	25–19	25–21	18–25	15–13	104–103	Report 1 Report 2

==== Regular season (2nd Half) ====
- All times are Europe Time (UTC+03:00).

Date	Time		Score		Set 1	Set 2	Set 3	Set 4	Set 5	Total	Report
4 January 2025	14:00	VakıfBank Spor Kulübü	3–0	Galatasaray Daikin	25–20	25–16	25–14	–	–	75–50	Report 1 Report 2
12 January 2025	14:30	Galatasaray Daikin	3–1	Aras Kargo	25–18	25–13	26–28	25–19	–	101–78	Report 1 Report 2
15 January 2025	14:00	Zeren Spor	1–3	Galatasaray Daikin	31–29	21–25	19–25	12–25	–	83–104	Report 1 Report 2
19 January 2025	15:00	Galatasaray Daikin	3–0	Sarıyer Belediyesi Spor Kulübü	25–19	25–12	25–12	–	–	75–43	Report 1 Report 2
26 January 2025	13:00	Bahçelievler Belediye Spor Kulübü	2–3	Galatasaray Daikin	23–25	9–25	27–25	25–19	6–15	90–109	Report 1 Report 2
2 February 2025	16:00	Galatasaray Daikin	0–3	Fenerbahçe Medicana	18–25	16–25	17–25	–	–	51–75	Report 1 Report 2
9 February 2025	15:00	Aydın Büyükşehir Belediyespor	1–3	Galatasaray Daikin	25–23	7–25	20–25	20–25	–	72–98	Report 1 Report 2
26 February 2025	19:00	Galatasaray Daikin	3–0	Türk Hava Yolları	25–23	25–14	25–18	–	–	75–55	Report 1 Report 2
23 February 2025	15:00	Nilüfer Belediyespor	0–3	Galatasaray Daikin	13–25	21–25	18–25	–	–	52–75	Report 1 Report 2
2 March 2025	15:00	Galatasaray Daikin	3–0	Keçiören Belediyesi Sigorta Shop	25–13	26–24	25–19	–	–	76–56	Report 1 Report 2
8 March 2025	18:00	Beşiktaş	0–3	Galatasaray Daikin	18–25	20–25	15–25	–	–	53–75	Report 1 Report 2
16 March 2025	19:30	Galatasaray Daikin	0–3	Eczacıbaşı Dynavit	19–25	20–25	24–26	–	–	63–76	Report 1 Report 2
19 March 2025	17:00	Galatasaray Daikin	3–1	Kuzeyboru	25–17	25–19	29–31	25–18	–	104–85	Report 1 Report 2

==== Playoffs ====
===== 1–4th place =====
- All times are Europe Time (UTC+03:00).

Date	Time		Score		Set 1	Set 2	Set 3	Set 4	Set 5	Total	Report
9 April 2025	13:30	Galatasaray Daikin	3–2	Fenerbahçe Medicana	25–23	20–25	25–23	21–25	15–10	106–106	Report 1 Report 2
12 April 2025	13:30	Fenerbahçe Medicana	3–1	Galatasaray Daikin	27–25	18–25	25–18	25–11	–	95–79	Report 1 Report 2
14 April 2025	17:00	Fenerbahçe Medicana	3–2	Galatasaray Daikin	23–25	25–20	16–25	25–13	15–9	104–92	Report 1 Report 2

===== 3–4th place =====
- All times are Europe Time (UTC+03:00).

Date	Time		Score		Set 1	Set 2	Set 3	Set 4	Set 5	Total	Report
17 April 2025	16:00	Galatasaray Daikin	0–3	Eczacıbaşı Dynavit	14–25	12–25	14–25	–	–	40–75	Report 1 Report 2
20 April 2025	15:30	Eczacıbaşı Dynavit	3–2	Galatasaray Daikin	15–25	25–22	25–16	23–25	15–10	103–98	Report 1 Report 2

=== Turkish Women's Volleyball Cup ===
==== Group A ====
Pos	Team	Pld	W	L	Pts	SW	SL	SR	SPW	SPL	SPR
1	Galatasaray Daikin	2	2	0	6	6	0	MAX	150	118	1.271
2	Zeren Spor	2	1	1	3	3	3	1.000	133	131	1.015
3	Sarıyer Belediyesi Spor Kulübü	2	0	2	0	0	6	0.000	116	150	0.773

Source: Puan Durumu - 2024 - 2025 SEZONU - AXA SİGORTA KUPA VOLEY KADINLAR

===== Results =====
- All times are Europe Time (UTC+03:00).

Date	Time		Score		Set 1	Set 2	Set 3	Set 4	Set 5	Total	Report
20 September 2024	16:00	Galatasaray Daikin	3–0	Zeren Spor	25–18	25–19	25–21	–	–	75–58	Report 1 Report 2
21 September 2024	14:00	Sarıyer Belediyesi Spor Kulübü	0–3	Galatasaray Daikin	21–25	23–25	16–25	–	–	60–75	Report 1 Report 2

==== Quarter-finals ====
- All times are Europe Time (UTC+03:00).

Date	Time		Score		Set 1	Set 2	Set 3	Set 4	Set 5	Total	Report
12 February 2025	15:30	VakıfBank Spor Kulübü	3–2	Galatasaray Daikin	25–20	26–28	25–17	18–25	15–12	109–102	Report 1 Report 2

=== BVA Cup ===
==== Results ====
- All times are Europe Time (UTC+03:00).

Date	Time		Score		Set 1	Set 2	Set 3	Set 4	Set 5	Total	Report
10 September 2024	19:00	Galatasaray Daikin (Turkey)	3–0	(Bosnia and Herzegovina) ZOK Igman	25–6	25–7	25–16	–	–	75–29	P2; Report 1 Report 2
11 September 2024	19:00	KV Drita (Kosovo)	0–3	(Turkey) Galatasaray Daikin	8–25	12–25	7–25	–	–	27–75	P2; Report 1 Report 2
12 September 2024	19:00	Galatasaray Daikin (Turkey)	3–0	(Greece) PAOK	25–17	25–21	25–20	–	–	75–58	P2; Report 1 Report 2

=== CEV Challenge Cup ===
==== 32nd finals ====
- All times are Europe Time (UTC+03:00).

Date	Time		Score		Set 1	Set 2	Set 3	Set 4	Set 5	Total	Report
8 October 2024	20:00	Galatasaray Daikin (Turkey)	3–0	(Greece) AO Thiras	25–14	25–20	25–16	–	–	75–50	P2; Report 1 Report 2
15 October 2024	19:00	AO Thiras (Greece)	0–3	(Turkey) Galatasaray Daikin	14–25	11–25	17–25	–	–	42–75	P2; Report 1 Report 2

==== 16th finals ====
- All times are Europe Time (UTC+03:00).

Date	Time		Score		Set 1	Set 2	Set 3	Set 4	Set 5	Total	Report
5 November 2024	19:30	Galatasaray Daikin (Turkey)	3–0	(Germany) VC Wiesbaden	25–22	25–17	25–14	–	–	75–53	P2; Report 1 Report 2
14 November 2024	21:30	VC Wiesbaden (Germany)	1–3	(Turkey) Galatasaray Daikin	15–25	15–25	25–17	20–25	–	75–92	P2; Report 1 Report 2

==== 8th finals ====
- All times are Europe Time (UTC+03:00).

Date	Time		Score		Set 1	Set 2	Set 3	Set 4	Set 5	Total	Report
27 November 2024	21:30	Sm'Aesch Pfeffingen (Switzerland)	0–3	(Turkey) Galatasaray Daikin	18–25	13–25	17–25	–	–	48–75	P2; Report 1 Report 2
12 December 2024	19:30	Galatasaray Daikin (Turkey)	3–0	(Switzerland) Sm'Aesch Pfeffingen	25–9	25–12	25–18	–	–	75–39	P2; Report 1 Report 2

==== Quarter-finals ====
- All times are Europe Time (UTC+03:00).

Date	Time		Score		Set 1	Set 2	Set 3	Set 4	Set 5	Total	Report
8 January 2025	20:00	Olympiacos SFP (Greece)	0–3	(Turkey) Galatasaray Daikin	11–25	24–26	17–25	–	–	52–76	P2; Report 1 Report 2
23 January 2025	20:30	Galatasaray Daikin (Turkey)	3–2	(Greece) Olympiacos SFP	25–13	20–25	22–25	25–9	15–8	107–80	P2; Report 1 Report 2

==== Semi-finals ====
- All times are Europe Time (UTC+03:00).

Date	Time		Score		Set 1	Set 2	Set 3	Set 4	Set 5	Total	Report
5 February 2025	19:30	Galatasaray Daikin (Turkey)	1–3	(Italy) Reale Mutua Fenera Chieri'76	29–27	20–25	17–25	17–25	–	83–102	P2; Report 1 Report 2
18 February 2025	22:00	Reale Mutua Fenera Chieri'76 (Italy)	1–3	(Turkey) Galatasaray Daikin	25–22	20–25	23–25	25–27	–	93–99	P2; Report 1 Report 2
Golden set		Reale Mutua Fenera Chieri'76 (Italy)	15–13	(Turkey) Galatasaray Daikin							
