= 2026–27 Turkish Women's Volleyball League =

- League: Turkish Women's Volleyball League
- Sport: Volleyball
- Duration: 3 October 2026 – April 2027
- Teams: 14

Turkish Women's Volleyball League seasons
- ← 2025–26 2027–28 →

The 2026–27 Turkish Women's Volleyball League, branded as 2026–2027 Vodafone Sultans League (2026–2027 Vodafone Sultanlar Ligi in Turkish) is the 44th edition of the top-level women's volleyball tournament of the Turkish Women's Volleyball League.

In a statement made by the federation on June 3, 2026, it was stated that the participation fee for the Sultanlar League was 500,000 TL. The application deadline for participation set as July 10, 2026.

In the 2026–27 season, teams will be allowed to have a maximum of 6 foreign players in their 14-person match squad and a maximum of 5 foreign players on the field at the same time.

The fixtures were released on 13 August 2026.

== Teams ==
Fourteen teams competed in the league stage.

#	Club	Head Coach	Captain	City
1	Afyon Bld.	(Turkey) Gökhan Çokşen	Sabriye Gönülkırmaz	Afyonkarahisar
2	Aras Kargo	(Turkey) Suphi Doğancı	Hazal Selin Uygur	İzmir
3	Beşiktaş	(Italy) Lorenzo Micelli	Buket Gülübay	Istanbul
4	Eczacıbaşı Peron İstanbul	(Italy) Giulio Bregoli	Simge Aköz	Istanbul
5	Fenerbahçe Medicana	(Italy) Stefano Lavarini	Eda Erdem	Istanbul
6	Galatasaray Daikin	(Italy) Alberto Bigarelli	İlkin Aydın	Istanbul
7	Göztepe	(Bulgaria) Radoslav Arsov	Ezgi Bektaş	İzmir
8	İlbank	(Turkey) Mehmet Duygun	Sinem Arıncı	Ankara
9	Kuzeyboru	(Italy) Lorenzo Pintus	Tuğba Şenoğlu	Aksaray
10	Manisa BB	(Turkey) Görkem Kazan	Büşra Kılıçlı	Manisa
11	Nilüfer Bld.	(Turkey) Gökhan Durmaz	Buse Ünal	Bursa
12	Türk Hava Yolları	(Italy) Davide Mazzanti	Melis Yılmaz	Istanbul
13	VakıfBank	(Italy) Giovanni Guidetti	Zehra Güneş	Istanbul
14	Zeren Spor	(Turkey) Ahmetcan Erşimşek	Fatma Yıldırım	Ankara

== Competition format ==
The season will consist of a double round-robin regular season following by classification play-offs. After the league stage, the top four teams will enter the championship play-offs, while other teams will play classification rounds.

== Regular season ==
The regular season will play by 14 teams over 26 matches.

Pos	Team	Pld	W	L	Pts	SW	SL	SR	SPW	SPL	SPR	Qualification or relegation
1	VakıfBank	9	9	0	26	27	4	6.750	755	617	1.224	Play-off (1st-4th)
2	Fenerbahçe Medicana	8	8	0	23	24	3	8.000	660	500	1.320	Play-off (1st-4th)
3	Eczacıbaşı Peron İstanbul	9	7	2	21	24	9	2.667	773	636	1.215	Play-off (1st-4th)
4	Türk Hava Yolları	9	6	3	17	19	15	1.267	760	723	1.051	Play-off (1st-4th)
5	Galatasaray Daikin	9	5	4	17	19	16	1.188	786	770	1.021	Play-off (5th-8th)
6	Kuzeyboru	9	5	4	14	21	19	1.105	892	863	1.034	Play-off (5th-8th)
7	Aras Kargo	9	5	4	14	18	17	1.059	734	765	0.959	Play-off (5th-8th)
8	Göztepe	8	4	4	11	14	16	0.875	658	678	0.971	Play-off (5th-8th)
9	Beşiktaş	9	3	6	10	16	21	0.762	782	818	0.956	
10	İlbank	9	3	6	8	11	22	0.500	719	794	0.906	
11	Nilüfer Belediyespor	9	2	7	9	14	21	0.667	716	762	0.940	
12	Zeren Spor	9	2	7	7	11	24	0.458	737	822	0.897	
13	Afyon Bld. Yüntaş	9	2	7	4	10	25	0.400	716	842	0.850	Relegation
14	Manisa BB	9	1	8	5	9	25	0.360	709	807	0.879	Relegation

Updated to match(es) played on 15 November 2026. Source: TVF

=== Fixture and Results ===
==== First Half (Weeks 1-13) ====
The first half of the season will be played between October 4 and December 13, 2026.

The Fenerbahçe vs. Göztepe match, scheduled for the 3rd week, has been postponed to a later date due to weather conditions.

The Aras Kargo vs Fenerbahçe match, scheduled for the 10th week, has been postponed to a later date due to health issues among the Aras Kargo players.

Date	Time		Score		Set 1	Set 2	Set 3	Set 4	Set 5	Total	Report
Week 1
3 Oct 26	14.00	VakıfBank	3–1	Beşiktaş	25–16	25–18	23–25	25–19		98–78	Report
3 Oct 26	16.00	Nilüfer Bld.	2–3	Eczacıbaşı Peron İstanbul	25–20	25–19	18–25	19–25	12–15	99–104	Report
4 Oct 26	13.00	Fenerbahçe Medicana	3–0	Manisa BB	25–12	25–17	25–14			75–43	Report
4 Oct 26	14.00	Kuzeyboru	2–3	Afyon Bld.	22–25	25–19	23–25	25–23	13–15	108–107	Report
4 Oct 26	16.00	İlbank	3–1	Göztepe	25–22	25–22	25–27	25–17		100–88	Report
4 Oct 26	16.00	Aras Kargo	3–0	Zeren Spor	25–16	25–20	25–20			75–56	Report
4 Oct 26	19.00	Türk Hava Yolları	3–2	Galatasaray Daikin	23–25	19–25	25–23	25–22	15–13	107–108	Report

Date	Time		Score		Set 1	Set 2	Set 3	Set 4	Set 5	Total	Report
Week 2
11 Oct 26	13.00	Galatasaray Daikin	3–1	Nilüfer Bld.	25–21	25–15	17–25	25–20		92–81	Report
11 Oct 26	15.00	Afyon Bld.	1–3	Türk Hava Yolları	25–22	18–25	18–25	20–25		81–97	Report
11 Oct 26	16.00	Manisa BB	3–1	Kuzeyboru	25–18	26–28	25–21	25–22		101–89	Report
11 Oct 26	16.00	Göztepe	0–3	VakıfBank	20–25	22–25	19–25			61–75	Report
11 Oct 26	16.00	Eczacıbaşı Peron İstanbul	3–0	Aras Kargo	25–14	25–16	25–17			75–47	Report
11 Oct 26	16.00	Zeren Spor	3–1	İlbank	28–30	25–21	32–30	25–21		110–102	Report
11 Oct 26	19.00	Beşiktaş	2–3	Fenerbahçe Medicana	25–20	25–23	16–25	23–25	12–15	101–108	Report

Date	Time		Score		Set 1	Set 2	Set 3	Set 4	Set 5	Total	Report
Week 3
14 Oct 26	14.00	Kuzeyboru	3–1	Türk Hava Yolları	18–25	25–19	25–20	25–22		93–86	Report
14 Oct 26	16.00	Aras Kargo	3–2	Galatasaray Daikin	22–25	16–25	25–18	25–20	15–9	103–97	Report
14 Oct 26	19.00	Manisa BB	1–3	Beşiktaş	26–24	15–25	22–25	22–25		85–99	Report
14 Oct 26	19.00	Nilüfer Bld.	3–0	Afyon Bld.	25–20	25–20	25–14			75–54	Report
14 Oct 26	19.00	VakıfBank	3–0	Zeren Spor	25–23	25–19	27–25			77–67	Report
14 Oct 26	19.00	İlbank	0–3	Eczacıbaşı Peron İstanbul	23–25	17–25	14–25			54–75	Report
8 Dec 26	14.00	Fenerbahçe Medicana		Göztepe	–	–	–	–	–	0–0	Report

Date	Time		Score		Set 1	Set 2	Set 3	Set 4	Set 5	Total	Report
Week 4
18 Oct 26	13.00	Beşiktaş	2–3	Kuzeyboru	16–25	25–22	24–26	25–18	12–15	102–106	Report
18 Oct 26	15.00	Afyon Bld.	1–3	Aras Kargo	25–22	21–25	20–25	23–25		89–97	Report
18 Oct 26	15.00	Zeren Spor	0–3	Fenerbahçe Medicana	12–25	17–25	18–25			47–75	Report
18 Oct 26	16.00	Türk Hava Yolları	3–1	Nilüfer Bld.	25–13	18–25	25–11	25–19		93–68	Report
18 Oct 26	16.00	Göztepe	3–0	Manisa BB	25–15	20–20	25–16			70–51	Report
18 Oct 26	18.00	Eczacıbaşı Peron İstanbul	2–3	VakıfBank	25–14	25–18	18–25	22–25	9–15	99–97	Report
18 Oct 26	19.00	Galatasaray Daikin	3–1	İlbank	21–25	25–21	25–23	25–15		96–84	Report

Date	Time		Score		Set 1	Set 2	Set 3	Set 4	Set 5	Total	Report
Week 5
25 Oct 26	13.00	Beşiktaş	1–3	Göztepe	18–25	25–18	19–25	24–26		86–94	Report
25 Oct 26	14.00	Kuzeyboru	3–2	Nilüfer Bld.	20–25	25–27	25–17	25–18	15–13	110–100	Report
25 Oct 26	14.00	VakıfBank	3–0	Galatasaray Daikin	25–20	25–20	25–22			75–62	Report
25 Oct 26	16.00	Aras Kargo	1–3	Türk Hava Yolları	22–25	16–25	25–23	21–25		84–98	Report
25 Oct 26	16.00	Manisa BB	2–3	Zeren Spor	23–25	25–18	23–25	25–18	11–15	107–101	Report
25 Oct 26	16.00	İlbank	3–1	Afyon Bld.	25–16	28–26	19–25	25–21		97–88	Report
25 Oct 26	19.00	Fenerbahçe Medicana	3–1	Eczacıbaşı Peron İstanbul	25–27	27–25	25–21	25–22		102–95	Report

Date	Time		Score		Set 1	Set 2	Set 3	Set 4	Set 5	Total	Report
Week 6
1 Nov 26	15.00	Afyon Bld.	1–3	VakıfBank	20–25	35–33	19–25	17–25		91–108	Report
1 Nov 26	16.00	Göztepe	3–1	Kuzeyboru	20–25	25–22	25–23	25–21		95–91	Report
1 Nov 26	16.00	Nilüfer Bld.	2–3	Aras Kargo	25–20	25–21	22–25	24–26	10–15	106–107	Report
1 Nov 26	16.00	Zeren Spor	2–3	Beşiktaş	23–25	28–26	25–22	24–26	8–15	108–114	Report
1 Nov 26	16.00	Türk Hava Yolları	3–0	İlbank	25–20	25–22	25–20			75–62	Report
1 Nov 26	16.00	Eczacıbaşı Peron İstanbul	3–0	Manisa BB	30–28	25–11	25–20			80–59	Report
1 Nov 26	19.00	Galatasaray Daikin	0–3	Fenerbahçe Medicana	22–25	18–25	18–25			58–75	Report

Date	Time		Score		Set 1	Set 2	Set 3	Set 4	Set 5	Total	Report
Week 7
4 Nov 26	16.30	Manisa BB	0–3	Galatasaray Daikin	29–31	22–25	25–27			76–83	Report
4 Nov 26	18.00	Kuzeyboru	3–2	Aras Kargo	21–25	25–18	21–25	25–20	15–7	107–95	Report
4 Nov 26	19.00	Göztepe	3–2	Zeren Spor	16–25	25–20	25–20	19–25	15–12	100–102	Report
4 Nov 26	19.00	Beşiktaş	0–3	Eczacıbaşı Peron İstanbul	15–25	16–25	16–25			47–75	Report
4 Nov 26	19.00	VakıfBank	3–0	Türk Hava Yolları	25–21	25–22	25–11			75–54	Report
5 Nov 26	14.00	Fenerbahçe Medicana	3–0	Afyon Bld.	25–10	25–15	25–18			75–43	Report
5 Nov 26	19.00	İlbank	0–3	Nilüfer Bld.	17–25	22–25	13–25			52–75	Report

Date	Time		Score		Set 1	Set 2	Set 3	Set 4	Set 5	Total	Report
Week 8
8 Nov 26	14.00	Galatasaray Daikin	3–1	Beşiktaş	25–20	17–25	25–17	25–18		92–80	Report
8 Nov 26	15.00	Eczacıbaşı Peron İstanbul	3–0	Göztepe	25–20	25–18	25–18			75–56	Report
8 Nov 26	15.00	Afyon Bld.	3–2	Manisa BB	29–27	21–25	25–20	20–25	15–13	110–110	Report
8 Nov 26	16.00	Aras Kargo	3–0	İlbank	25–22	25–22	25–18			75–62	Report
8 Nov 26	16.00	Zeren Spor	0–3	Kuzeyboru	24–26	24–26	23–25			71–77	Report
8 Nov 26	16.00	Nilüfer Bld.	0–3	VakıfBank	18–25	22–25	14–25			54–75	Report
8 Nov 26	19.00	Türk Hava Yolları	0–3	Fenerbahçe Medicana	18–25	17–25	20–25			55–75	Report

Date	Time		Score		Set 1	Set 2	Set 3	Set 4	Set 5	Total	Report
Week 9
15 Nov 26	13.00	Fenerbahçe Medicana	3–0	Nilüfer Bld.	25–17	25–19	25–22			75–58	Report
15 Nov 26	14.00	Zeren Spor	1–3	Eczacıbaşı Peron İstanbul	15–25	19–25	25–20	16–25		75–95	Report
15 Nov 26	14.00	VakıfBank	3–0	Aras Kargo	25–15	25–19	25–17			75–51	Report
15 Nov 26	16.00	Göztepe	1–3	Galatasaray Daikin	25–22	22–25	18–25	24–26	–	89–98	Report
15 Nov 26	16.00	Manisa BB	1–3	Türk Hava Yolları	14–25	17–25	25–20	21–25		77–95	Report
15 Nov 26	17.00	Kuzeyboru	2–3	İlbank	27–29	25–16	23–25	25–21	11–15	111–106	Report
15 Nov 26	19.00	Beşiktaş	3–0	Afyon Bld.	25–17	25–17	25–18			75–52	Report

Date	Time		Score		Set 1	Set 2	Set 3	Set 4	Set 5	Total	Report
Week 10
21 Nov 26	14.00	Eczacıbaşı Peron İstanbul	3–0	Kuzeyboru	25–15	25–23	25–22			75–60	Report
22 Nov 26	13.00	Galatasaray Daikin	3–1	Zeren Spor	–	–	–	–	–	0–0	Report
22 Nov 26	15.00	Afyon Bld.	–	Göztepe	–	–	–	–	–	0–0	Report
22 Nov 26	16.00	İlbank	–	VakıfBank	–	–	–	–	–	0–0	Report
22 Nov 26	16.00	Nilüfer Bld.	–	Manisa BB	–	–	–	–	–	0–0	Report
22 Nov 26	19.00	Türk Hava Yolları	–	Beşiktaş	–	–	–	–	–	0–0	Report
TBD		Aras Kargo	–	Fenerbahçe Medicana	–	–	–	–	–	0–0	Report

Date	Time		Score		Set 1	Set 2	Set 3	Set 4	Set 5	Total	Report
Week 11
28 Nov 26	14.00	Kuzeyboru	–	VakıfBank	–	–	–	–	–	0–0	Report
29 Nov 26	13.00	Fenerbahçe Medicana	–	İlbank	–	–	–	–	–	0–0	Report
29 Nov 26	14.00	Zeren Spor	–	Afyon Bld.	–	–	–	–	–	0–0	Report
29 Nov 26	16.00	Manisa BB	–	Aras Kargo	–	–	–	–	–	0–0	Report
29 Nov 26	17.00	Göztepe	–	Türk Hava Yolları	–	–	–	–	–	0–0	Report
29 Nov 26	18.00	Eczacıbaşı Peron İstanbul	–	Galatasaray Daikin	–	–	–	–	–	0–0	Report
29 Nov 26	19.00	Beşiktaş	–	Nilüfer Bld.	–	–	–	–	–	0–0	Report

Date	Time		Score		Set 1	Set 2	Set 3	Set 4	Set 5	Total	Report
Week 12
		Galatasaray Daikin	–	Kuzeyboru	–	–	–	–	–	0–0	
		VakıfBank	–	Fenerbahçe Medicana	–	–	–	–	–	0–0	
		Afyon Bld.	–	Eczacıbaşı Peron İstanbul	–	–	–	–	–	0–0	
		İlbank	–	Manisa BB	–	–	–	–	–	0–0	
		Türk Hava Yolları	–	Zeren Spor	–	–	–	–	–	0–0	
		Aras Kargo	–	Beşiktaş	–	–	–	–	–	0–0	
		Nilüfer Bld.	–	Göztepe	–	–	–	–	–	0–0	

Date	Time		Score		Set 1	Set 2	Set 3	Set 4	Set 5	Total	Report
Week 13
		Kuzeyboru	–	Fenerbahçe Medicana	–	–	–	–	–	0–0	
		Galatasaray Daikin	–	Afyon Bld.	–	–	–	–	–	0–0	
		Manisa BB	–	VakıfBank	–	–	–	–	–	0–0	
		Eczacıbaşı Peron İstanbul	–	Türk Hava Yolları	–	–	–	–	–	0–0	
		Beşiktaş	–	İlbank	–	–	–	–	–	0–0	
		Zeren Spor	–	Nilüfer Bld.	–	–	–	–	–	0–0	
		Göztepe	–	Aras Kargo	–	–	–	–	–	0–0	

==== Second Half (Weeks 14-26) ====
The second half of the season will be played between January 2 and March 20, 2027.

Date	Time		Score		Set 1	Set 2	Set 3	Set 4	Set 5	Total	Report
Week 14
		Afyon Bld.	–	Kuzeyboru	–	–	–	–	–	0–0	
		Manisa BB	–	Fenerbahçe Medicana	–	–	–	–	–	0–0	
		Galatasaray Daikin	–	Türk Hava Yolları	–	–	–	–	–	0–0	
		Beşiktaş	–	VakıfBank	–	–	–	–	–	0–0	
		Eczacıbaşı Peron İstanbul	–	Nilüfer Bld.	–	–	–	–	–	0–0	
		Göztepe	–	İlbank	–	–	–	–	–	0–0	
		Zeren Spor	–	Aras Kargo	–	–	–	–	–	0–0	

Date	Time		Score		Set 1	Set 2	Set 3	Set 4	Set 5	Total	Report
Week 15
		Kuzeyboru	–	Manisa BB	–	–	–	–	–	0–0	
		Türk Hava Yolları	–	Afyon Bld.	–	–	–	–	–	0–0	
		Fenerbahçe Medicana	–	Beşiktaş	–	–	–	–	–	0–0	
		Nilüfer Bld.	–	Galatasaray Daikin	–	–	–	–	–	0–0	
		VakıfBank	–	Göztepe	–	–	–	–	–	0–0	
		Aras Kargo	–	Eczacıbaşı Peron İstanbul	–	–	–	–	–	0–0	
		İlbank	–	Zeren Spor	–	–	–	–	–	0–0	

Date	Time		Score		Set 1	Set 2	Set 3	Set 4	Set 5	Total	Report
Week 16
		Türk Hava Yolları	–	Kuzeyboru	–	–	–	–	–	0–0	
		Beşiktaş	–	Manisa BB	–	–	–	–	–	0–0	
		Afyon Bld.	–	Nilüfer Bld.	–	–	–	–	–	0–0	
		Göztepe	–	Fenerbahçe Medicana	–	–	–	–	–	0–0	
		Galatasaray Daikin	–	Aras Kargo	–	–	–	–	–	0–0	
		Zeren Spor	–	VakıfBank	–	–	–	–	–	0–0	
		Eczacıbaşı Peron İstanbul	–	İlbank	–	–	–	–	–	0–0	

Date	Time		Score		Set 1	Set 2	Set 3	Set 4	Set 5	Total	Report
Week 17
		Kuzeyboru	–	Beşiktaş	–	–	–	–	–	0–0	
		Nilüfer Bld.	–	Türk Hava Yolları	–	–	–	–	–	0–0	
		Manisa BB	–	Göztepe	–	–	–	–	–	0–0	
		Aras Kargo	–	Afyon Bld.	–	–	–	–	–	0–0	
		Fenerbahçe Medicana	–	Zeren Spor	–	–	–	–	–	0–0	
		İlbank	–	Galatasaray Daikin	–	–	–	–	–	0–0	
		VakıfBank	–	Eczacıbaşı Peron İstanbul	–	–	–	–	–	0–0	

Date	Time		Score		Set 1	Set 2	Set 3	Set 4	Set 5	Total	Report
Week 18
		Nilüfer Bld.	–	Kuzeyboru	–	–	–	–	–	0–0	
		Göztepe	–	Beşiktaş	–	–	–	–	–	0–0	
		Türk Hava Yolları	–	Aras Kargo	–	–	–	–	–	0–0	
		Zeren Spor	–	Manisa BB	–	–	–	–	–	0–0	
		Afyon Bld.	–	İlbank	–	–	–	–	–	0–0	
		Eczacıbaşı Peron İstanbul	–	Fenerbahçe Medicana	–	–	–	–	–	0–0	
		Galatasaray Daikin	–	VakıfBank	–	–	–	–	–	0–0	

Date	Time		Score		Set 1	Set 2	Set 3	Set 4	Set 5	Total	Report
Week 19
		Kuzeyboru	–	Göztepe	–	–	–	–	–	0–0	
		Aras Kargo	–	Nilüfer Bld.	–	–	–	–	–	0–0	
		Beşiktaş	–	Zeren Spor	–	–	–	–	–	0–0	
		İlbank	–	Türk Hava Yolları	–	–	–	–	–	0–0	
		Manisa BB	–	Eczacıbaşı Peron İstanbul	–	–	–	–	–	0–0	
		VakıfBank	–	Afyon Bld.	–	–	–	–	–	0–0	
		Fenerbahçe Medicana	–	Galatasaray Daikin	–	–	–	–	–	0–0	

Date	Time		Score		Set 1	Set 2	Set 3	Set 4	Set 5	Total	Report
Week 20
		Aras Kargo	–	Kuzeyboru	–	–	–	–	–	0–0	
		Zeren Spor	–	Göztepe	–	–	–	–	–	0–0	
		Nilüfer Bld.	–	İlbank	–	–	–	–	–	0–0	
		Eczacıbaşı Peron İstanbul	–	Beşiktaş	–	–	–	–	–	0–0	
		Türk Hava Yolları	–	VakıfBank	–	–	–	–	–	0–0	
		Galatasaray Daikin	–	Manisa BB	–	–	–	–	–	0–0	
		Afyon Bld.	–	Fenerbahçe Medicana	–	–	–	–	–	0–0	

Date	Time		Score		Set 1	Set 2	Set 3	Set 4	Set 5	Total	Report
Week 21
		Kuzeyboru	–	Zeren Spor	–	–	–	–	–	0–0	
		İlbank	–	Aras Kargo	–	–	–	–	–	0–0	
		Göztepe	–	Eczacıbaşı Peron İstanbul	–	–	–	–	–	0–0	
		VakıfBank	–	Nilüfer Bld.	–	–	–	–	–	0–0	
		Beşiktaş	–	Galatasaray Daikin	–	–	–	–	–	0–0	
		Fenerbahçe Medicana	–	Türk Hava Yolları	–	–	–	–	–	0–0	
		Manisa BB	–	Afyon Bld.	–	–	–	–	–	0–0	

Date	Time		Score		Set 1	Set 2	Set 3	Set 4	Set 5	Total	Report
Week 22
		İlbank	–	Kuzeyboru	–	–	–	–	–	0–0	
		Eczacıbaşı Peron İstanbul	–	Zeren Spor	–	–	–	–	–	0–0	
		Aras Kargo	–	VakıfBank	–	–	–	–	–	0–0	
		Galatasaray Daikin	–	Göztepe	–	–	–	–	–	0–0	
		Nilüfer Bld.	–	Fenerbahçe Medicana	–	–	–	–	–	0–0	
		Afyon Bld.	–	Beşiktaş	–	–	–	–	–	0–0	
		Türk Hava Yolları	–	Manisa BB	–	–	–	–	–	0–0	

Date	Time		Score		Set 1	Set 2	Set 3	Set 4	Set 5	Total	Report
Week 23
		Kuzeyboru	–	Eczacıbaşı Peron İstanbul	–	–	–	–	–	0–0	
		VakıfBank	–	İlbank	–	–	–	–	–	0–0	
		Zeren Spor	–	Galatasaray Daikin	–	–	–	–	–	0–0	
		Fenerbahçe Medicana	–	Aras Kargo	–	–	–	–	–	0–0	
		Göztepe	–	Afyon Bld.	–	–	–	–	–	0–0	
		Manisa BB	–	Nilüfer Bld.	–	–	–	–	–	0–0	
		Beşiktaş	–	Türk Hava Yolları	–	–	–	–	–	0–0	

Date	Time		Score		Set 1	Set 2	Set 3	Set 4	Set 5	Total	Report
Week 24
		VakıfBank	–	Kuzeyboru	–	–	–	–	–	0–0	
		Galatasaray Daikin	–	Eczacıbaşı Peron İstanbul	–	–	–	–	–	0–0	
		İlbank	–	Fenerbahçe Medicana	–	–	–	–	–	0–0	
		Afyon Bld.	–	Zeren Spor	–	–	–	–	–	0–0	
		Aras Kargo	–	Manisa BB	–	–	–	–	–	0–0	
		Türk Hava Yolları	–	Göztepe	–	–	–	–	–	0–0	
		Nilüfer Bld.	–	Beşiktaş	–	–	–	–	–	0–0	

Date	Time		Score		Set 1	Set 2	Set 3	Set 4	Set 5	Total	Report
Week 25
		Kuzeyboru	–	Galatasaray Daikin	–	–	–	–	–	0–0	
		Fenerbahçe Medicana	–	VakıfBank	–	–	–	–	–	0–0	
		Eczacıbaşı Peron İstanbul	–	Afyon Bld.	–	–	–	–	–	0–0	
		Manisa BB	–	İlbank	–	–	–	–	–	0–0	
		Zeren Spor	–	Türk Hava Yolları	–	–	–	–	–	0–0	
		Beşiktaş	–	Aras Kargo	–	–	–	–	–	0–0	
		Göztepe	–	Nilüfer Bld.	–	–	–	–	–	0–0	

Date	Time		Score		Set 1	Set 2	Set 3	Set 4	Set 5	Total	Report
Week 26
		Fenerbahçe Medicana	–	Kuzeyboru	–	–	–	–	–	0–0	
		Afyon Bld.	–	Galatasaray Daikin	–	–	–	–	–	0–0	
		VakıfBank	–	Manisa BB	–	–	–	–	–	0–0	
		Türk Hava Yolları	–	Eczacıbaşı Peron İstanbul	–	–	–	–	–	0–0	
		İlbank	–	Beşiktaş	–	–	–	–	–	0–0	
		Nilüfer Bld.	–	Zeren Spor	–	–	–	–	–	0–0	
		Aras Kargo	–	Göztepe	–	–	–	–	–	0–0	
