= Alessya Safronova =

Kazakhstani volleyball player (born 1986)

Personal information
- Full name: Alessya Safronova Canbolat
- Nationality: Kazakhstani - Ukrainian - Turkish
- Born: 10 February 1986 (age 40); Zaporizhzhia, Ukraine
- Height: 192 cm (76 in)
- Weight: 57 kg (126 lb)
- Spike: 290 cm (110 in)
- Block: 280 cm (110 in)

Volleyball information
- Position: Middle blocker
- Number: 14

Career
Years	Teams
2003-2007; 2007-2008; 2008-2009; 2009-2013; 2013-2014; 2014-2015; 2015-2017; 2017-2018; 2018-2020	(Ukraine) Krug Cherkasy (Kazakhstan) VC Zhetyssu (Russia) AES Balakovo (Turkey) İller Bankası (Turkey) Ereğli Belediyespor (Turkey) Karşıyaka (Kazakhstan) Altay VC (Turkey) Beylikdüzü (Kazakhstan) VC Zhetyssu

National team
2008-2020	Kazakhstan

Alessya Safronova or Alessya Canbolat (Russian: Алеся Сафронова Канполат Ukrainian: Алеся Сафронова Канболат; born 10 February 1986) is a former Kazakhstani-Ukrainian female volleyball player.

== Personal life ==
She has Turkish citizenship after got married with Turkish volleyball coach Burhan Şaik Canbolat. Her daughter Liza Safronova plays for Fenerbahçe and member of the Turkey U21.

== National team ==
She was part of the Kazakhstan women's national volleyball team, during the 2018 Asian Games she led the team to victory over Philippines, and despite an error, ended up scoring 11–25, 25–22, 15–25, 25–19, 14–16 with personal best being 13 markers.

== Awards ==
- 2004-05 Ukrainian Super League - Gold Medal
- 2005-06 Ukrainian Super League - Gold Medal
- 2006-07 Ukrainian Super League - Gold Medal
- 2007-08 Kazakhstan Volleyball Championship - Gold Medal
- 2012 BVA Cup Championship - Gold Medal
- 2014 BVA Cup Championship - Gold Medal
- 2015-16 Kazakhstan Volleyball Championship - Gold Medal
- 2015-16 Kazakhstan Volleyball Cup- Silver Medal
- 2016 Asian Women's Club Volleyball Championship - Fourth Place
- 2016-17 Kazakhstan Volleyball Championship - Gold Medal
- 2016 Kazakhstan Super Cup - Gold Medal
- 2017 Asian Women's Club Volleyball Championship - Fourth Place
- 2018 Kazakhstan Super Cup - Gold Medal
- 2018-19 Kazakhstan Volleyball Championship - Silver Medal
- 2019 Kazakhstan Super Cup - Gold Medal
- 2019-20 Kazakhstan Volleyball Championship - Gold Medal
