= Manisa Büyükşehir Belediyespor (women's volleyball) =

Turkish women's volleyball team

Manisa Büyükşehir Belediyespor Women's volleyball
- Full name: Manisa Büyükşehir Belediye Spor Kulübü Kadın Voleybol Takımı
- Short name: Manisa BB
- Founded: 2022; 4 years ago
- Ground: Manisa Tarık Almış Sport Hall (Capacity: 1,044)
- Manager: (Turkey) Görkem Kazan
- League: Turkish Women's Volleyball League
- 2025–26: 2nd

Manisa Büyükşehir Belediyespor Women's Volleyball, also known as Vestel Manisa Büyükşehir Belediyespor Women's Volleyball for sponsorship reasons, is the women's volleyball team of the same named multi-sports club Manisa Büyükşehir Belediyespor based in Manisa, western Turkey. The team play in the topflight Turkish Women's Volleyball League.

== History ==
Manisa Belediyespor (Manisa Municipality Sports) was founded in 1994. Following the city's attainment of metropolitan status, the club's name was changed to Manisa Büyükşehir Belediyespor (Manisa Metropolitan Municipality Sports) in 2014.

The women's volleyball team was formed in 2022, and competed in the fourth-tier Turkish Women's Volleyball Regional League during the 2022–23 season. Winning the competition thanks to their performance in the Regional League finals, the team was promoted to the Women's Second League.

=== 2024–25 ===
To strengthen the team roster, the club recruited fourTurkish players, as the middle blocker İlayda Alkan, the liberos Neslihan Çengeltepe and Hilal Köse, as well as the outside hitter Cansu Ayyıldız before the beginning of the second season in the third-tier Second League .

The team successfully reached the play-offs of the Second League during the 2024–25 season, and was promoted to the second-tier First League after finishing the Group A as runners-up.

=== 2025-26 ===
The club made for the first time foreign player transfers for the new season in the First League including the Indonesian opposite hitter Megawati Hangestri Pertiwi Polish opposite hitter Aleksandra Rasińska, German outside hitter Tanja Großer, and Puero Rican outside hitter Dariana Hollingsworth.

Having won 20 of the 22 matches played during the 2025-26 Women's First League regular season, and accumulated 55 points, the team finished at the top of its group, and advanced to the final stage. The team finished the league in second place, and secured the right to compete in the topflight Turkish Women's Volleyball League for the 2026-27 season.

=== 2026-27 ===
For the first season in the topflight Sultans League, the club renewed the contract of Aleksandra Rasińska, and recruited the Brazilians setter Carolina Leite, and opposite hitter Lorenne Teixeira, the German outside hitter Ivana Vanjak, and the Bosnia and Herzegovina outside hitter Edina Begić.

== Colors ==
The team colors are green and white.

== Arena ==
The team play their home matches at the 1,044-seating capacity Manisa Tarık Almış Sport Hall in Turgutlu.

== Team roster 2026–27 ==
- Head coach: (Turkey) Görkem Kazan

No.	Player	Date of Birth	Height (m)	Position	Country
1	Firdevs Kiremitçi	29 June 1999 (age 27)	1.93	Middle blocker	Turkey
2	Işıl Öz	12 April 1998 (age 28)	1.76	Libero	Turkey
3	Carolina Leite	15 November 1992 (age 33)	1.78	Setter	Brazil
4	Ivana Vanjak	30 May 1995 (age 31)	1.93	Outside hitter	Germany
6	Sude Hacımustafaoğlu	25 March 2002 (age 24)	1.82	Outside hitter	Turkey
9	Büşra Kılıçlı	16 July 1990 (age 36)	1.89	Middle blocker	Turkey
10	Edina Begić	9 October 1992 (age 34)	1.85	Outside hitter	Bosnia and Herzegovina
11	Merve Nur Öztürk	1 January 2000 (age 26)	1.85	Outside hitter	Turkey
19	Gizem Mısra Aşçı	26 January 1998 (age 28)	1.80	Setter	Turkey
22	Nisan Barut	1 January 2005 (age 21)	1.87	Middle blocker	Turkey
24	Lorenne Teixeira	8 January 1996 (age 30)	1.87	Opposite hitter	Brazil
26	Fatma Nur Yılmaz	9 October 2000 (age 26)	1.85	Middle blocker	Turkey
35	Melis Demir	29 January 1996 (age 30)	1.73	Libero	Turkey
99	Aleksandra Rasińska	6 November 1998 (age 27)	1.90	Opposite hitter	Poland
