= Ivana Vanjak =

Croatian-German volleyball player (born 1995)

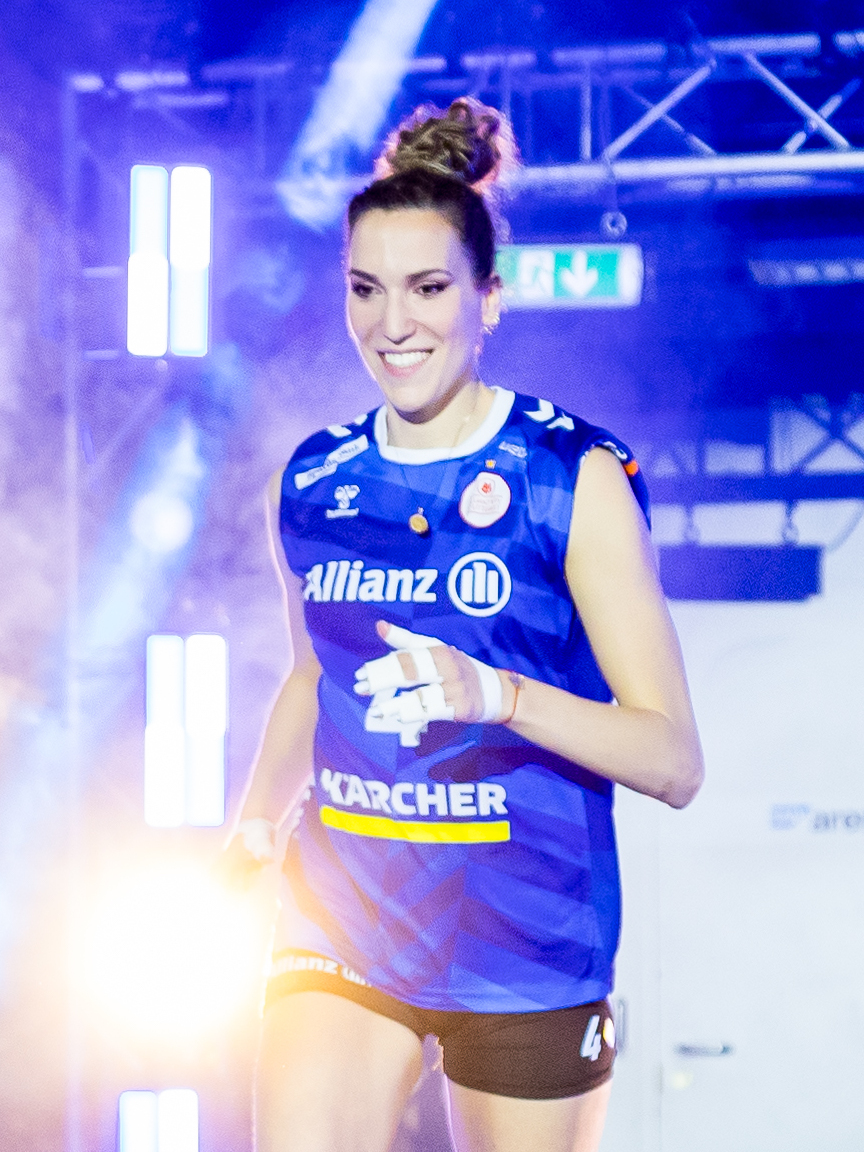
- Ivna Vanjak of Allianz MTV Stuttgart (2024)

Personal information
- Born: 30 May 1995 (age 31)
- Height: 1.93 m (6 ft 4 in)
- Weight: 80 kg (180 lb)
- Spike: 330 cm (130 in)
- Block: 308 cm (121 in)

Volleyball information
- Position: Outside hitter
- Current club: Manisa BB
- Number: 4

Career
Years
- 2011–2012
- 2012–2013
- 2013–2017
- 2017–2018
- 2018–2019
- 2019–2020
- 2020–2021
- 2022
- 2023–2024
- 2024
- 2024–2026
- 2025–2026
- 2025–2026
- 2026
- 2026–
Teams
- (Germany) TG Bad Soden
- (Germany) VC Wiesbaden
- (United States) Stanford Cardinal
- (Germany) USC Münster
- (Germany) TG Bad Soden
- (Germany) USC Münster
- (France) ASPTT Mulhouse
- (Turkey) Kuzeyboru
- (Germany) Allianz MTV Stuttgartt
- (Indonesia) Jakarta Pertamina Enduro
- (Greece) Olympiacos Piraeus
- (Italy) Bartoccini-MC Restauri Perugia
- (China) Henan Shuanghui
- (Vietnam) Hà Nội Tasco Auto
- (Turkey) Manisa BB

National team
2018–2022	Germany
Honours
Women's volleyball
Representing Germany

Ivana Vanjak (born 30 May 1995) is a German women's volleyball player of Croatian origin. She is 1.93 m (6 ft 4 in) tall at 80 kg (180 lb) and plays in the outside hitter position. She plays for Manisa BB in the Sultans League. She was part of the Germeny national team.

== Club career ==
Vanjak stands 1.93 m (6 ft 4 in) tall and weighs 80 kg (180 lb). She has a spike height of 330 cm (130 in), a block height of 308 cm (121 in) and plays as outside hitter.

Vanjak started her volleyball career at the hometown club TG Bad Soden. She then played in Germany for VC Wiesbaden, where she debuted in the topflight Volleyball-Bundesliga der Frauen. During her time in the United States between 2013 and 2017, she was a redshirt with the college volleyball team Stanford Cardinal. In 2017, she played also beach volleyball in the college team. Returned home, she was recruited mid August 2017 by the top-league club USC Münster to replace the leaving outside hitter Hanna Orthmann. In November 2018, she joined her former club TG Bad Soden to play in the 2. Bundesliga für Frauen. In the 2019–2020 LNV Ligue A Féminine season, she played again for USC Münster, leaving the club in March 2020. She then moved to France, and played for ASPTT Mulhouse, where she won the 2020–21 French Women's Volleyball Cup, and was named the MVP of the Cup. End December 2021, she left the French club, and moved to Turkey to play for Kuzeyboru in the 2021–22 Turkish Women's Volleyball League. Early June 2023, she transferred to Allianz MTV Stuttgart, after she went back to Germany. She won the German league title, the Cup, and the Super Cup with her team. In 2024, she was a short time in Indonesia with Jakarta Pertamina Enduro. End August 2024, she moved to Greece, and signed with Olympiacos Piraeus for the 2024–25 A1 Ethniki Women's Volleyball league season. Mid December 2025, she went to Italy, and signed with Bartoccini-MC Restauri Perugia to play in the Italian 2nd League. In the 2025–26 season, she played for Henan Shuanghui in the Chinese Women's Volleyball Super League. In March 2026, she moved to Vietnam, and joined Hà Nội Tasco Auto for a very short time, where she won the 2026 Hùng Vương Volleyball Cup. In April 2026, she went to Turkey again, and signed a deal with Manisa BB, which was newly promoted to the topflight Sultans League.

== International career ==
Vanjak is a member of the German national team. She was part of the national team, which finished the 2018 FIVB Women's Volleyball Nations League in Nanjing, China on eleventh place. She played at the 2018 FIVB Women's Volleyball World Championship in Japan, where her team ranked also eleventh. The 2019 Women's European Volleyball Championship, she finished sixth with her team. She took part at the 2020 Olympics – European qualification with the national team, which became runners-up after losing the final match. Her national team finished the 2021 FIVB Women's Volleyball Nations League in Rimini, Italy on the tenth place. She took the tenth place with her national team at the 2022 FIVB Women's Volleyball Nations League in Ankara, Turkey.

== Personal life ==
Ivana Vanjak was born to Croatian parents Tonci and Valerija Vanjak on 30 May 1995. She has two sisters, Antonija and Ana, who is also a volleyball player, and a brother, Ivan. Her uncle, Josko Vukičević, was a professional basketball player and member of the Croatian National team.

After graduating from the high school Albert-Einstein-Schule in Schwalbach am Taunus, Germany in 2013, she went to the United States, and entered Stanford University in California, where she majored in chemical engineerin between 2013 and 2016..

== Honours ==
=== Club ===
==== Leagues ====
- (gold) 2016 NCAA Division I tournament 2020–21 (Stanford Cardinal)
- (gold) 2020–21 LNV Ligue A Féminine (ASPTT Mulhouse)
- (gold) 2024–25 A1 Ethniki Women's Volleyball (Olympiacos Piraeus)

===== Cups =====
- (gold) 2021 Coupe de France de Volleyball Féminin (ASPTT Mulhouse)
- (gold) 2021 Supercoupe de France féminine de volley-ball
- (gold) 2023 VBL Supercup Frauen (Allianz MTV Stuttgart)
- (gold) 2024 DVV-Pokal für Frauen (Allianz MTV Stuttgart)
- (gold) 2024 Greek Women's Volleyball Super Cup (Olympiacos Piraeus)
- (gold) 2024–25 Greek Women's Volleyball Cup (Olympiacos Piraeus)

=== Individual ===
MVP
2021 Coupe de France de Volleyball Féminin (ASPTT Mulhouse)
