= Victoria Mayer =

Argentine volleyball player (born 2001)

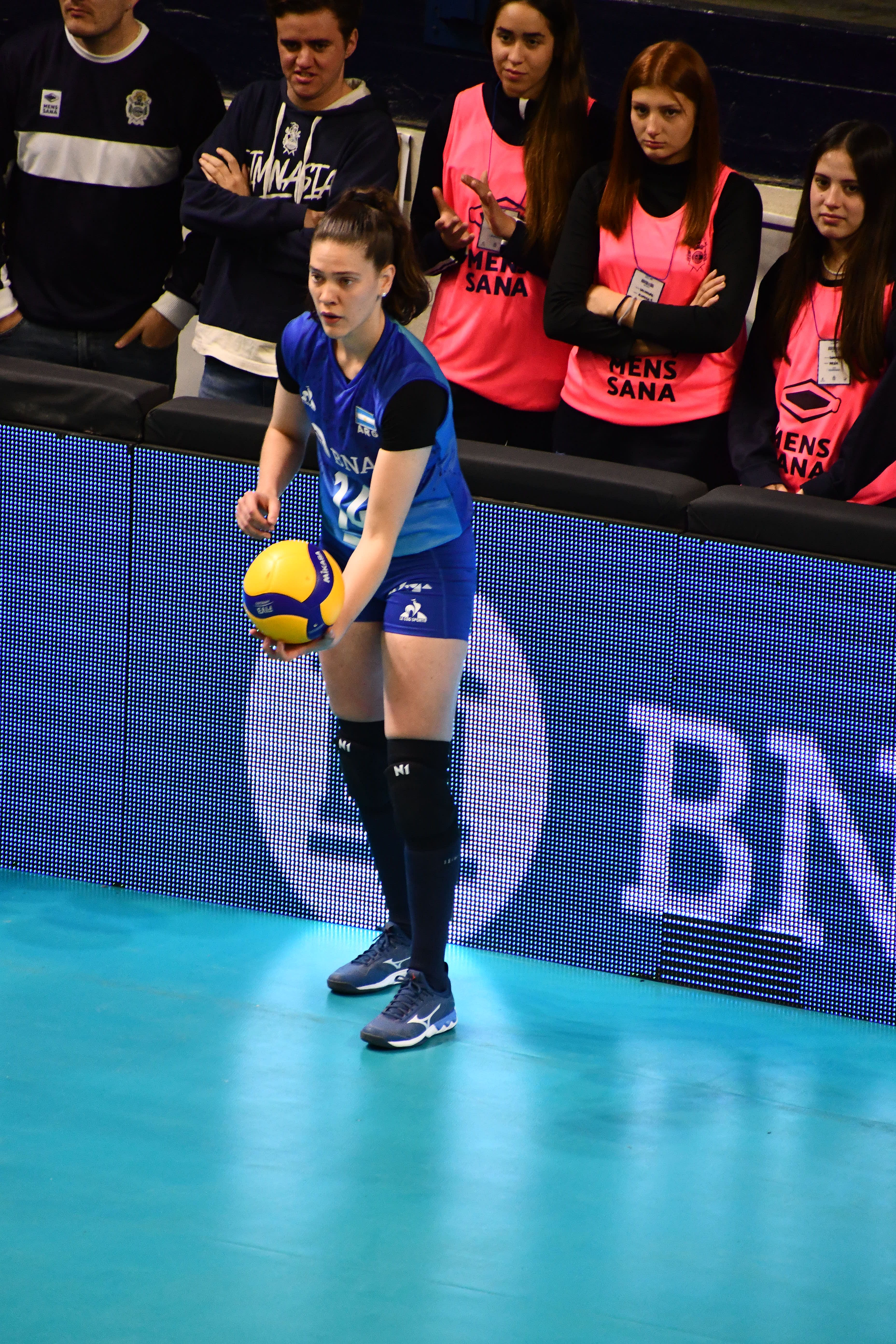
- Victoria Mayer of Argentina national team (2024)

Personal information
- Full name: María Victoria Mayer
- Nickname: Vicky
- Born: 19 June 2001 (age 25) Santa Fe, Argentina
- Home town: Santa Fe, Argentina
- Height: 178 cm (70 in)
- Weight: 66 kg (146 lb)
- Spike: 289 cm (114 in)
- Block: 270 cm (106 in)

Volleyball information
- Position: Setter
- Current club: Afyon Bld.
- Number: 14 (club and national team)

Career
- Years: Team
- 2017–2018; 2018–2019; 2019–2020; 2020–2021; 2021–2022; 2021–2022; 2022–2024; 2024–2025; 2025–2026; 2026–: CA San Jorge; Gimnasia y Esgrima La Plata; Flamengo U21; Reale Mutua Fenera Chieri '76; Stade français Paris Saint-Cloud; Unet E-Work Busto Arsizio; Volley Mulhouse Alsace; MOYA Radomka Radom; Levallois Paris Saint-Cloud; Afyon Bld.

National team
- Years: Team
- 2018-now: Argentina
Honours
Representing Argentina
Pan American Games
Bronze medal – third place	2019 Lima	Team
Pan-American Cup
Gold medal – first place	2023 Ponce	Team
Gold medal – first place	2024 León/Irapuato	Team
South American Championship
Silver medal – second place	2023 Recife	Team

María Victoria Mayer (born 19 June 2001), nicknamed Vicky, is an Argentine volleyball player. She is part of the Argentina women's national volleyball team. She competed at the 2020 Summer Olympics. She plays in the topflight Turkis Women's Volleyball League for Afyon Bld.

== Club career ==
After appearing for CA San Jorge, Regatas - Santa Fe and Gimnasia y Esgrima La Plata in her country between 2017 and 2019, Mayer went abroad, and played for Flamengo U21 (2019–20), in Btazil, Reale Mutua Fenera Chieri '76 (2020–21) in Italy, Stade français Paris Saint-Cloud (2021–22) in France, Unet E-Work sto Arsizio (2021–22) again in Italy, Volley Mulhouse Alsace (2022–24) again in France,MOYA Radomka Radom (2024–25) in Poland and Levallois Paris Saint-Cloud (2025–26) in France again. End April 2026, she moved to Turkey, and signed with the Afyon Bld. to play in the topflight Turkis Women's Volleyball League.

== International career ==
Mayer participated in the 2017 FIVB Volleyball Girls' U18 World Championship, and 2018 FIVB Volleyball Women's Nations League.
