= Jovana Kocić =

Serbian volleyball player (born 1998)

- Jovana Kocić of CSM Volei Alba Blaj

Personal information
- Nationality: Serbian
- Born: 24 February 1998 (age 28); Serbia
- Height: 1.90 m (6 ft 3 in)
- Weight: 85 kg (187 lb)
- Spike: 290 cm (114 in)
- Block: 285 cm (112 in)

Volleyball information
- Position: Middle blocker
- Current club: Afyon Bld.
- Number: 6

Career
Years
- 2013–2014
- 2014–2020
- 2020–2024
- 2024–2025
- 2025
- 2025–2026
- 2026–
Teams
- (Serbia) OK Sterija
- (Serbia) OK Vizura Beograd
- (Romania) CSM Volei Alba Blaj
- (Italy) CDA Volley Talmassons FVG
- (Turkey) İlBank
- (Greece) P.A.O.K.
- (Turkey) Afyon Bld.

National team
- 2015–2016
- 2017–
- Serbia U19
- Serbia
Honours
{{MedalSportWomen's volleyball }}
Representing Serbia

Jovana Kocić (Serbian Cyrillic: Јована Коцић; born 24 February 1998) is a Serbian professional volleyball player of Afyon Bld. in the topflight Turkish Women's Volleyball League. She is 1.90 m (6 ft 3 in) tall and plays as middle blocker. She is part of the Serbia national team.

== Club career ==
Kocić stands 1.90 m (6 ft 3 in) and weighs 85 kg (187 lb). She has a spike height of 290 cm (110 in), a block height of 285 cm (112 in) and plays in the middle blocker po<ition.

She started her volleyball career at OK Sterija in Belgrade, Serbia. She the played for OK Vizura Beograd. She then went abroad to jıin CSM Volei Alba Blaj in Blaj, Transylvania, Romania. In September 2025, the Ankara-based club İlBank, which was recently promoted to the first-tier Turkish Women's Volleyball League, transferred Kocić from the Italian club CDA Volley Talmassons FVG. Her contract was unexpectedly terminated mid December 2025 before the end of the league season. In the same time, she made a deal with the Greek club P.A.O.K. in Thessaloniki to play in the A1 Ethniki Women's Volleyball league. In the beginning of May 2026, she moved to Turkey again, and signed with Afyon Bld., which recently was promoted to the topflight Turkish Women's Volleyball League.

== International career ==
=== Serbia U19 ===
Kocić was part of the Serbia U19 team. She played at the 2015 FIVB Volleyball Girls' U18 World Championship in Peru. While her team took the fifyh place, she was named one of the two "Best Middle Blocker's. The same year, she won the silver medal with her team at the 2015 Girls' Youth European Volleyball Championship in Bulgaria. She won the silver medal at the 2016 Women's U19 Volleyball European Championship, and she was named again one of the "Best Midlle Blockers's.

=== Serbia ===
Kocić is a member of the Serbia national team. She played at the 2017 Women's European Volleyball Championship, and won the gold medal. She took part at the 2019 FIVB Women's Volleyball Nations League in China, which her team finished on the 13th place, and at the 2019 FIVB Volleyball Women's World Cup in Japan,, at which her ream ranked ninth. The 2021 FIVB Women's Volleyball Nations League in Italy finished her team as 13th. She won the bronze medal at the 2022 FIVB Women's Volleyball Nations League in Turkey. She finished the 2025 FIVB Women's Volleyball Nations League in Poland on the 15th place.

== Honours ==
=== Club ===
- (silver) A1 Ethniki Women's Volleyball (P.A.O.K.)

=== International ===
- (silver) 2015 Girls' Youth European Volleyball Championship
- (silver) 2016 Women's U19 Volleyball European Championship
- (gold) 2017 Women's European Volleyball Championship
- (bronze) 2022 FIVB Women's Volleyball Nations League

=== Individual ===
Best Middle Blocker
2015 FIVB Volleyball Girls' U18 World Championship
2016 Women's U19 Volleyball European Championship
