= Burhan Şaik Canbolat =

Turkish volleyball player and coach

Personal information
- Nationality: Turkish
- Born: 14 November 1967 (age 58)
- Height: 1.91 m (6 ft 3 in)

Coaching information
Previous teams coached
Years	Teams
2001–2015; 2015–2017; 2017–2018; 2018–2021; 2019–2020; 2022-2023	(Turkey) Iller Bankası; Altay VC (Turkey) Manisa Büyükşehir Belediyespor; Zhetyssu VC; Kazakhstan (Turkey) PTT Spor

Career
Years	Teams
1998–2001	Emlak Bankası

Burhan Şaik Canbolat (born 14 November 1967) is a Turkish volleyball coach and former volleyball player. He most recently coached Turkish Women's Volleyball League club PTT Spor in 2022-23 season. He is 191 cm (6.27 ft) tall.

== Personal life ==
He is married with former Kazakhstan national volleyball player Alessya Safronova. His daughter Liza Safronova plays for Fenerbahçe and member of the Turkey U21.

== Awards ==
- 2012 BVA Cup Championship - Gold Medal
- 2014 BVA Cup Championship - Gold Medal
- 2015-16 Kazakhstan Volleyball Championship - Gold Medal
- 2015-16 Kazakhstan Volleyball Cup- Silver Medal
- 2016 Asian Women's Club Volleyball Championship - Fourth Place
- 2016-17 Kazakhstan Volleyball Championship - Gold Medal
- 2016 Kazakhstan Super Cup - Gold Medal
- 2017 Asian Women's Club Volleyball Championship - Fourth Place
- 2018 Kazakhstan Super Cup - Gold Medal
- 2018-19 Kazakhstan Volleyball Championship - Silver Medal
- 2019 Kazakhstan Super Cup - Gold Medal
- 2019-20 Kazakhstan Volleyball Championship - Gold Medal
