= Afyon Belediyespor (women's volleyball) =

Women's volleyball club in Turkey

- Full name: Afyon Belediye Yüntaş Spor Kulübü
- Nickname: "Zafer'in Sultanları" ("Sultans of the Victory")
- Founded: 2024; 2 years ago
- Ground: Prof. Dr. Veysel Eroğlu Sport Hall
- Manager: (Turkey) Gökhan Rahman Çokşen
- League: Turkish Women's Volleyball First League

Afyon Belediyespor Women's Volleyball (Turkish: Afyon Belediye Spor Kulübü Kadın Voleybol Takımı), also known as Afyon Belediye Yüntaş for sponsorship reasons, is the women's volleyball team of the same named multi-sports club based in Afyonkarahisar, western Turkey. The team competes in the Turkish Women's Volleyball League.

== History ==
The Afyon Bld. women's volleyball team was formed in 202, and entered the third-tier Turkish Women's Volleyball Second League. The team finished the play-offs of the 2024–25 as champions, and was promoted to the First league. Following the 2025–26 season, they were promoted to the topflight Turkish Women's Volleyball League.

Afyon Bld. women's volleyball team is nicknamed "Zafer'in Sultanları" ("Sultans of the Victory") refereing to Afyonkarahisar, dubbed "Zafer'in Şehiri" ("City of the Victory"), as the place of the decisive victory in the Battle of Dumlupınar in 1922, and the Sultans League for the volleyball league.

=== 2026–27 ===
To strengthen the team roster, the club recruıted the Kazakhstan-Turkish outside hitter Liza Safronova, the Argentine setter Victoria Mayer, the Serbian middle blocker Jovana Kocić, the American opposite hitter Kashauna Williams, and the Dominican opposite hitter Katielle Alonzo, before the beginning of the 2026–27 Turkish Women's Volleyball League. In the new season, Gökhan Rahman Çokşen serves as the head coach.

== Colors ==
Club colors are purple and white.

== Arena ==
The team play their home matches at the 2018-built Prof. Dr. Veysel Eroğlu Sport Hall, which has a seating capacity of 2,833.

== Team roster 2026–27 ==
- Head coach: (Turkey) Gökhan Rahman Çokşenn

No.	Player	Date of Birth	Height (m)	Position	Country
1	Sema Nur Doluca Özbilge	10 July 1996 (age 30)	1.64	Libero	Turkey
2	Katielle Alonzo	30 September 2005 (age 20)	1.90	Outside hitter	Dominican Republic
4	Ceren Yüzgenç	11 June 2000 (age 26)	1.76	Opposite hitter	Turkey
6	Jovana Kocić	24 February 1998 (age 28)	1.90	Middle blocker	Serbia
7	Ilayda Naz Gergef	2 January 2006 (age 20)	1.74	Libero	Turkey
8	Berrak Deniz Kakaşçı	14 May 1997 (age 29)	1.76	Setter	Turkey
14	Victoria Mayer	19 June 2001 (age 25)	1.78	Setter	Argentina
15	Damla Tokman	2 April 2002 (age 24)	1.88	Middle blocker	Turkey
16	Aleksandra Milanova	4 July 2001 (age 25)	1.83	Outside hitter	Bulgaria
19	Sabriye Dikmen	17 May 1994 (age 32)	1.88	Middle blocker	Turkey
22	Aylin Toktamış	13 March 2001 (age 25)	1.82	Outside hitter	Turkey
23	Kashauna Williams	12 January 1999 (age 27)	1.86	Opposite hitter	United States
23	Kashauna Williams	12 January 1999 (age 27)	1.86	Opposite hitter	United States
41	Liza Safronova	17 January 2006 (age 20)	1.93	Outside hitter	KazakhstanTurkey
99	Sena Güleryüz	14 May 1999 (age 27)	1.89	Middle blocker	Turkey
