= Liza Safronova =

Kazakhstani-Turkish volleyball player (born 2006)

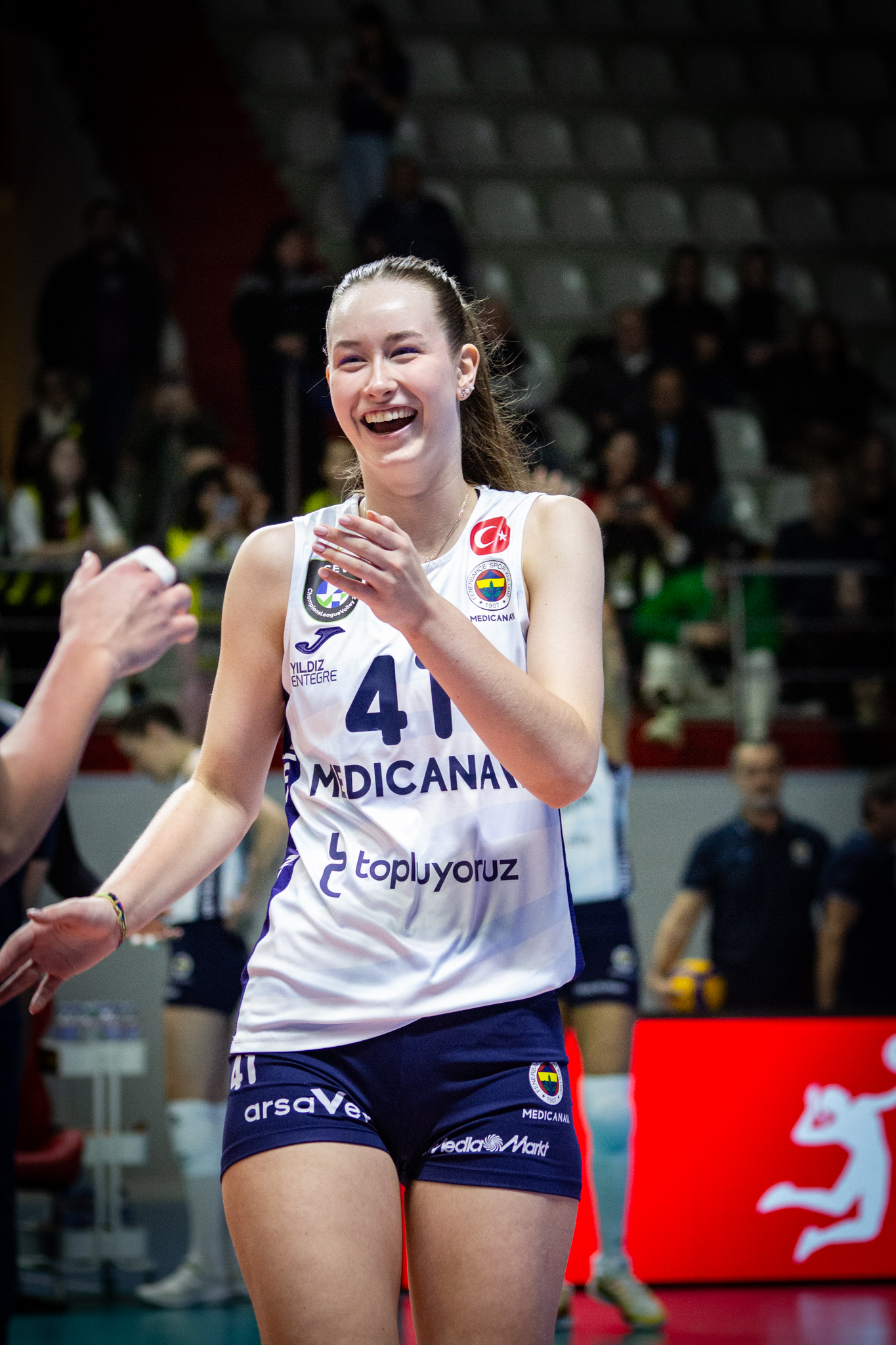
- Safronova with Fenerbahçe Medicana in 2025

Personal information
- Full name: Yelizaveta Safronova Canbolat,
- Nationality: Turkish - Kazakhstani
- Born: 17 January 2006 (age 20) Kyiv, Ukraine.
- Height: 1.93 m (6 ft 4 in)
- Weight: 69 kg (152 lb)

Volleyball information
- Position: Outside hitter / Spiker
- Current club: Afyon Bld.
- Number: 41 (club), 14 (national team)

Career
- Years: Team
- 2017–2023; 2023–2024; 2024–2025; 2025–2026; 2026–: VakifBank; Havran Bld.; Fenerbahçe Medicana; Volero Le Cannet; Afyon Bld.

National team
- Years: Team
- 2021–2023; 2023–: Turkey U19; Turkey U20
Honours
Women's volleyball
Representing Turkey
Mediterranean Games
Gold medal – first place	2026 Taranto	Team
Islamic Solidarity Games
Gold medal – first place	2025 Rıyadh	Team
FIVB U19 World Cup
Silver medal – second place	2023 Osijek/Szeged	Team
FIVB U23 Europe Cup
Bronze medal – third place	2024 Lecce/Copertino	Team
FIVB U20 Europe Cup
Gold medal – first place	2024 Sofia/Dublin	Team
BVA U21 Balkan Cup
Gold medal – first place	2024 Tirana	Team
BVA U19 Balkan Cup
Silver medal – second place	2023 Sofia	Team

Yelizaveta Safronova Canbolat (Russian: Елизавета Сафронова Джанболат, Ukrainian: Єлизавета Сафронова Джанболат; born 17 January 2006 in Kyiv, Ukraine) is a Turkish-Kazakhstani volleyball player who plays for Volero Le Cannet of Ligue Nationale de Volley and CEV Champions League. She is 193 cm (6.33 ft) tall at 69 kg (152 lb).

== Personal life ==
Safronova was born on 17 January 2006 in Kyiv, Ukraine, when her mother Alessya Safronova played for Krug Cherkasy. Her mother is of Ukraine descent former Kazakhstani international volleyball player, and her Turkish father Burhan Şaik Canbolat is former Kazakhstan women's national volleyball team coach.

Her family gave her full support, and encouraged her to follow her dream of becoming a volleyball star, like her idol, Fenerbahçe and Turkey national team captain Eda Erdem.

== Club career ==
Safronova started her volleyball career with Iller Bankası II (2013–15) in Ankara, Turkey. After then her mother transferred to Kazakhstan and she played for Altay II (2015–17). When her mother transferred to Beylikdüzü Bld. in Istanbul, she started to play for VakifBank II (2017–21) under coaching by Giuseppe Bosetti and Franca Bardelli.

She started her professional career with VakifBank (2021–23), and also played for Havran Bld. (2023–24).

On 29 February 2024, Safronova had an agreement with Fenerbahçe Medicana for further years. On 17 July 2024, Fenerbahçe Medicana announced the agreement. On 12 October 2024, she made her Sultanlar Ligi debut with the team against Nilüfer Bld.. On 9 January 2026, it was announced that Safronova and Fenerbaçhe officially parted ways.

For the 2025–26 season, she transferred to Volero Le Cannet in France.

Returned to Turkey, she signed a deal on 29 April 2026 with the newly to the topflight Turkish League promoted club Afyon Bld..

== International career ==
Safranova was therefore eligible to represent Turkey, Kazakhstan and Ukraine. She had chosen to represent the Turkey U19 between (2021–2023) and now a member of Turkey U20 which won the 2024 Volleyball European U20 Championship.

She was part of the Turkey team, which became champion at the 2025 Islamic Solidarity Games in Riyadh, Saudi Arabia.

She captured the gold medal at the 2026 Mediterranean Games in Taranto, Italy.

== Awards ==
=== Individual ===
- FIVB U20 European Championship "Best outside spiker"

=== Club ===
VakıfBank

- (gold) 2022 Turkish Junior League Championship
- (gold) 2023 Turkish Junior League Championship

Fenerbahçe

- (gold) 2024 Turkish Super Cup Championship
- (gold) 2024–25 Turkish Cup Championship
- (gold) 2025 Turkish Super Cup Championship

=== International ===
- (silver) 2023 FIVB U19 World Championship
- (silver) 2023 BVA U19 Balkan Cup
- (gold) 2024 FIVB U20 European Championship
- (gold) 2024 BVA U21 Balkan Cup
- (bronze) 2024 FIVB U23 European Championship -
- (gold) 2025 Islamic Solidarity Games
- (gold) 2026 Mediterranean Games

Awards
Preceded by (Serbia) Aleksandra Uzelac and (Poland) Karolina Staniszewska	Best outside spiker of FIVB U20 Europe Cup; 2024 (with (Turkey) Beren Yeşilırmak)	Succeeded by -
