= Büşra Kılıçlı =

Turkish volleyball player (born 1990)

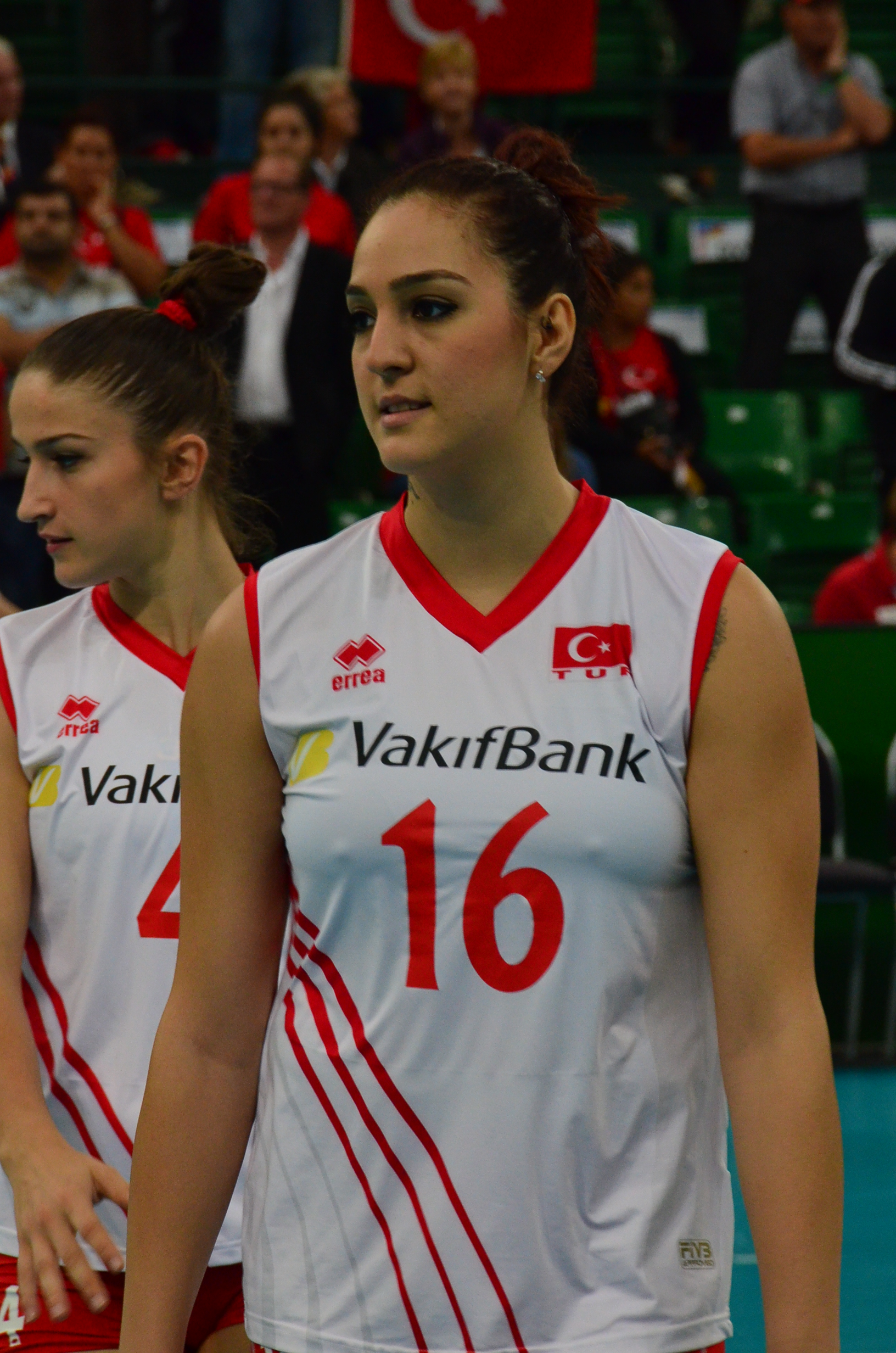

Personal information
- Born: 16 July 1990 (age 36); Gölcük, Turkey
- Height: 1.88 m (6 ft 2 in)
- Weight: 80 kg (176 lb)
- Spike: 310 cm (122 in)
- Block: 308 cm (121 in)

Volleyball information
- Position: Middle blocker
- Current club: Manisa BB
- Number: 9

Career
Years
- 2003–2007
- 2009–2010
- 2007–2019
- 2019–2020
- 2019–2021
- 2021–2023
- 2023–2024
- 2024–2026
- 2026–
Teams
- Eczacıbaşı U18l
- Bahçeşehir Üniversitesi
- Eczacıbaşı VitrA
- Beşiktaş
- Türk Hava Yolları
- Sarıyer Bld.
- Kuzeyboru
- Türk Hava Yolları
- Manisa BB

National team
Turkey
Medal record
Women's volleyball
Representing Turkey
World Grand Prix
Bronze medal – third place	2012 Ningbo	Team
European Championships
Bronze medal – third place	2011 Italy-Serbia	Team
European Games
Gold medal – first place	2015 Baku	Team
Montreux Volley Masters
Gold medal – first place	2015 Montreux	Team
Mediterranean Games
Silver medal – second place	2013 Mersin	Team

Büşra Kılıçlı (née Cansu; born 16 July 1990 in Gölcük) is a Turkish volleyball player. She is 188 cm (6.17 ft) and plays as a middle blocker. She currently plays for Manisa BB and wears number 9. She is regular Turkish national team player, including at the 2012 Summer Olympics.

== Awards ==
=== Individuals ===
- 2015 Montreux Volley Masters "2nd Best Middle Blocker"

=== Clubs ===
- 2011 Turkish Volleyball Super Cup - Champion, with Eczacıbaşı VitrA
- 2011-12 Turkish Cup - Champion, with Eczacıbaşı VitrA
- 2011-12 Aroma Women's Volleyball League - Champion, with Eczacıbaşı VitrA
- 2012 Turkish Volleyball Super Cup - Champion, with Eczacıbaşı VitrA
- 2012-2013 Turkish Women's Volleyball Cup - Runner-Up, with Eczacıbaşı VitrA
- 2012-2013 Turkish Women's Volleyball League - Runner-Up, with Eczacıbaşı VitrA
- 2014-15 CEV Champions League - Champion, with Eczacıbaşı VitrA
- 2015 FIVB Volleyball Women's Club World Championship - Champion, with Eczacıbaşı VitrA

=== National team ===
- 2011 European Championship - Bronze Medal
- 2012 FIVB World Grand Prix - Bronze Medal
- 2013 Mediterranean Games - Silver
- 2015 European Games - Gold

== Personal life ==
On August 2, 2015, Büşra Cansu married national basketball player Deniz Kılıçlı.

== See also ==
- Turkish women in sports
