= Kanami Tashiro =

Japanese volleyball player (born 1991)

Personal information
- Nationality: Japanese
- Born: 25 March 1991 (age 35); Shiga, Japan
- Height: 173 cm (68 in)
- Weight: 70 kg (154 lb)
- Spike: 280 cm (110 in)
- Block: 273 cm (107 in)

Volleyball information
- Position: Setter
- Current club: (Japan) Toray Arrows

Career
Years	Teams
2008–2018	(Japan) Toray Arrows
2018–2019	(Romania) CSM București
2019–2021	(Japan) Denso Airybees
2021–2023	(France) Neptunes de Nantes Volley-Ball
2023–2024	(Turkey) Galatasaray
2024–	(Japan) Toray Arrows

National team
Japan

Kanami Tashiro (田代 佳奈美, Tashiro Kanami; born 25 March 1991) is a Japanese volleyball player who plays for Toray Arrows. She is also part of the Japan women's national volleyball team and played at the 2016 Summer Olympics in Rio de Janeiro, and at the 2020 Summer Olympics, in Women's volleyball.

== Career ==
=== Club ===
On 22 June 2023, she signed a 1 + 1-year contract with Galatasaray.

=== National team ===
She participated at the 2016 FIVB World Grand Prix and 2018 FIVB Volleyball Women's Nations League.
