= Sude Hacımustafaoğlu =

Turkish volleyball player (born 2002)

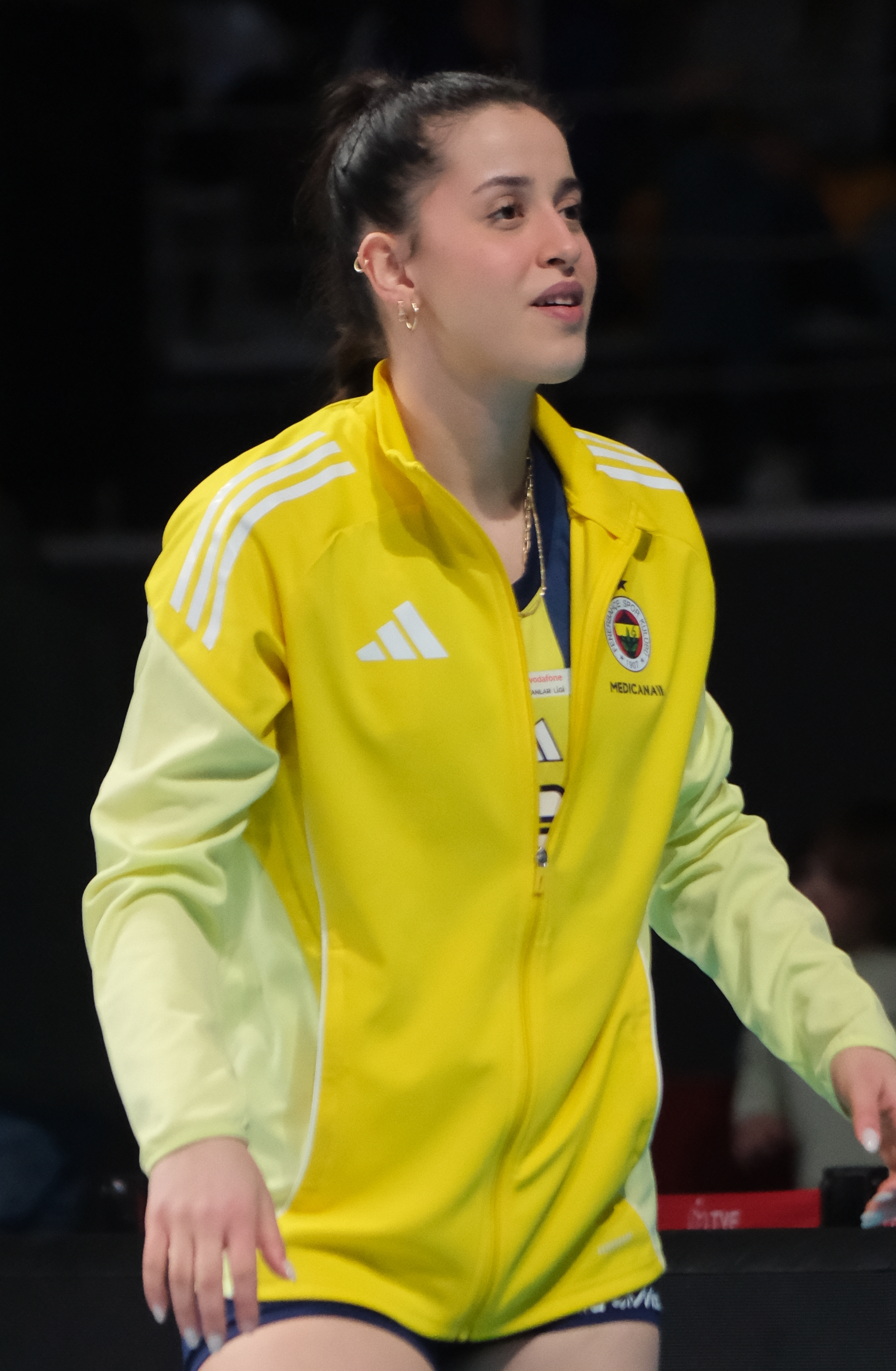

Personal information
- Full name: Sude Hacımustafaoğlu
- Born: 25 March 2002 (age 24); İzmir, Turkey
- Height: 1.80 m (5 ft 11 in)
- Weight: 70 kg (150 lb)
- Spike: 305 cm (120 in)
- Block: 290 cm (110 in)

Volleyball information
- Position: Wing-Spiker
- Current club: Manisa BB
- Number: 6

Career
Years
- 2018–2019
- 2019–2021
- 2020–2023
- 2022–2023
- 2023–2025
- 2024–2026
- 2026–
Teams
- Gelişim Koleji
- →Mehmet Erdem Maramara Akademi
- Galatasaray
- →Yeşilyurt
- Galatasaray
- →Göztepe
- Manisa BB

National team
Turkey

Sude Hacımustafaoğlu (born 25 March 2002, in İzmir, Turkey) is a Turkish female volleyball player. She is 180 cm (5.9 ft) tall at 70 kg (150 lb) and plays in the Wing-Spiker position. She plays for Manisa BB in the Sultans League.

== Youth career ==
She played at Gelişim College in the 2018–19 season. Drawing attention with his good game, Sude was transferred to Galatasaray youth team in August 2019.

== Club career ==
She was included in the Galatasaray A Team squad in the 2020–21 season.

On 21 June 2023, she signed a new contract with Galatasaray for 2 + 1 years.
