= Guillermo Naranjo Hernández =

Spanish volleyball coach (born 1977)

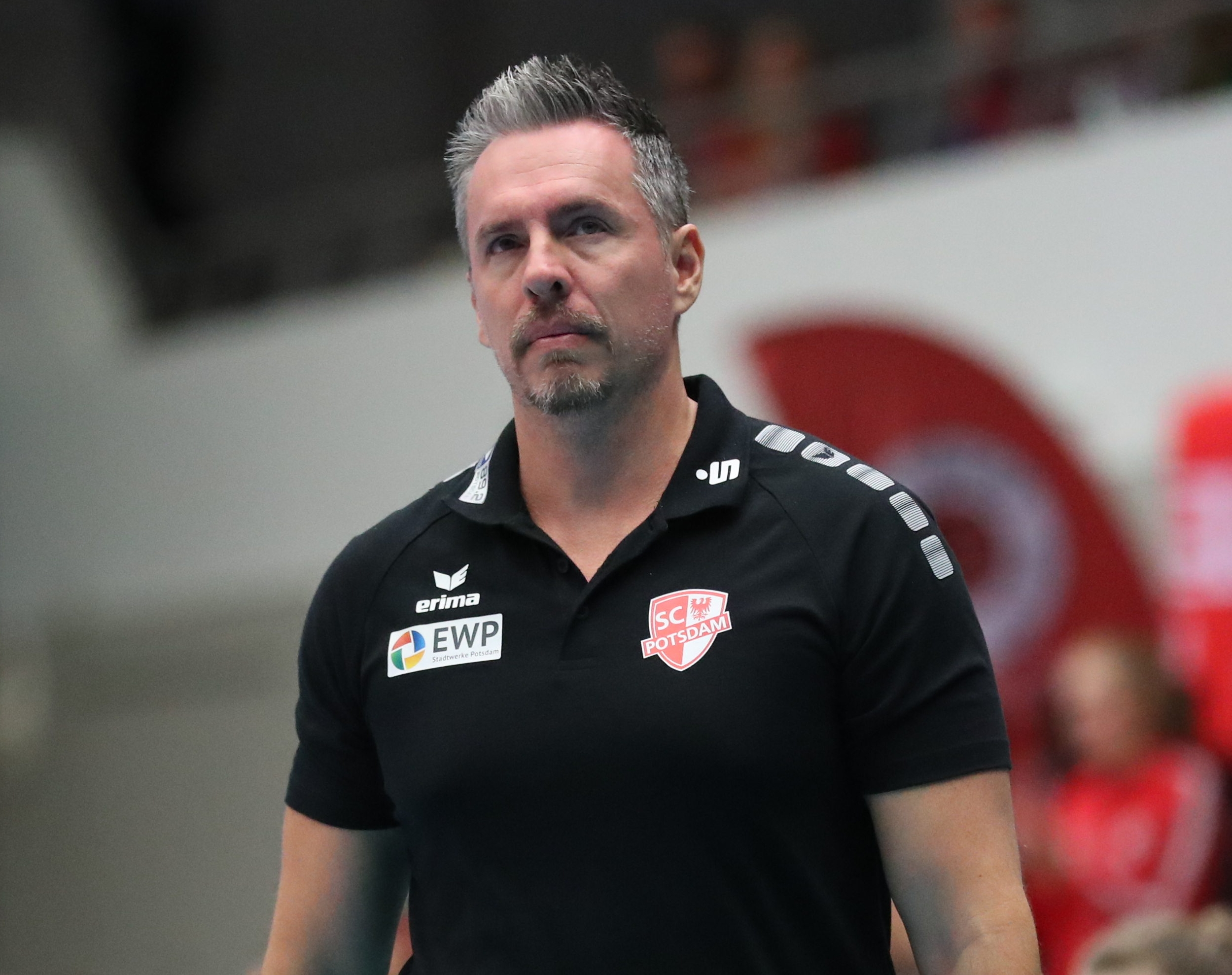

Personal information
- Full name: Guillermo Naranjo Hernández
- Born: 18 June 1977 (age 49); Santa Cruz de Tenerife, Spain

Coaching information
- Current team: CSM Volei Alba Blaj
Previous teams coached
Years	Teams
2012–2013; 2013–2017; 2017–2018; 2018–2021; 2018; 2018–2023; 2022– 2023–2024; 2025–	TSV GA Stuttgart; Allianz MTV Stuttgart; CSM Târgoviște; Greece; Enea PTPS Piła; SC Potsdam; Romania; Galatasaray; CSM Volei Alba Blaj

Guillermo Naranjo Hernández (born 18 June 1977) is a Spanish volleyball coach.

== Coaching career ==
The Spanish coach, who started his coaching career with Allianz MTV Stuttgart in 2013, continued his duties until 2017 and then coached the Romanian team CSM Târgoviște and the Polish team Enea PTPS Piła respectively.

Hernández, who won the German Super Cup and German Cup twice with the SC Potsdam team, served on the Greek Women's National Team between 2018 and 2021. Guillermo Naranjo Hernández, who won the silver medal with Greece at the 2018 Mediterranean Games, has also been the head coach of the Romanian Women's National Team since 2022.

=== Galatasaray ===
On June 19, 2023, it was announced that she became the Head Coach of Galatasaray Women's Volleyball Team.

It was announced that they parted ways with Galatasaray by mutual agreement on December 30, 2024.
