= Neşve Büyükbayram =

Turkish volleyball player (born 1990)

Personal information
- Born: 1 January 1990 (age 36); Istanbul, Turkey
- Height: 1.87 m (6 ft 2 in)
- Weight: 82 kg (181 lb)
- Spike: 300 cm (120 in)
- Block: 295 cm (116 in)

Coaching information
Previous teams coached
Years	Teams
2022–2023; 2023–2024; 2024–2026	Bahçeşehir University (Head coach); Galatasaray (assistant administrative manager); Galatasaray (team manager)

Volleyball information
- Position: Middle-blocker

Career
Years	Teams
2002–2004	Bahçeşehir University (youth)
2004–2007	Eczacıbaşı (youth)
2007–2010	Eczacıbaşı Zentiva
2010–2011	Yeşilyurt
2011–2012	Eczacıbaşı VitrA
2012–2013	Yeşilyurt
2013–2016	Halkbank Ankara
2016–2017	İdmanocağı SK
2017–2018	Halkbank Ankara

National team
Turkey

Neşve Büyükbayram (born 1 January 1990) is a Turkish retired volleyball player.

== Club career ==
Büyükbayram started her career in 2002 in the youth team of Bahçeşehir University in Istanbul.

On 10 December 2010, she signed a loan contract with the Yeşilyurt team until the end of the 2010–11 season.

She signed a contract with the İdmanocağı SK on 27 May 2016.

On 8 June 2017, she signed a contract with Halkbank Ankara volleyball team.

== Management career ==
=== Bahçeşehir Üniversitesi ===
Bahçeşehir University Women's Volleyball Team signed an agreement with Büyükbayram for the coaching position on August 31, 2022.

=== Galatasaray ===
On 14 September 2023, Büyükbayram was appointed as the assistant administrative manager at Galatasaray Sports Club Volleyball Branch.

On 3 May 2024, she was appointed as the Team Manager of Galatasaray Women's Volleyball Team.

It was announced that she parted ways with Galatasaray on July 7, 2026.

== Personal life ==
She married Burak Kubuş in 2018.
