= Duygu Düzceler =

Turkish volleyball player (born 1990)

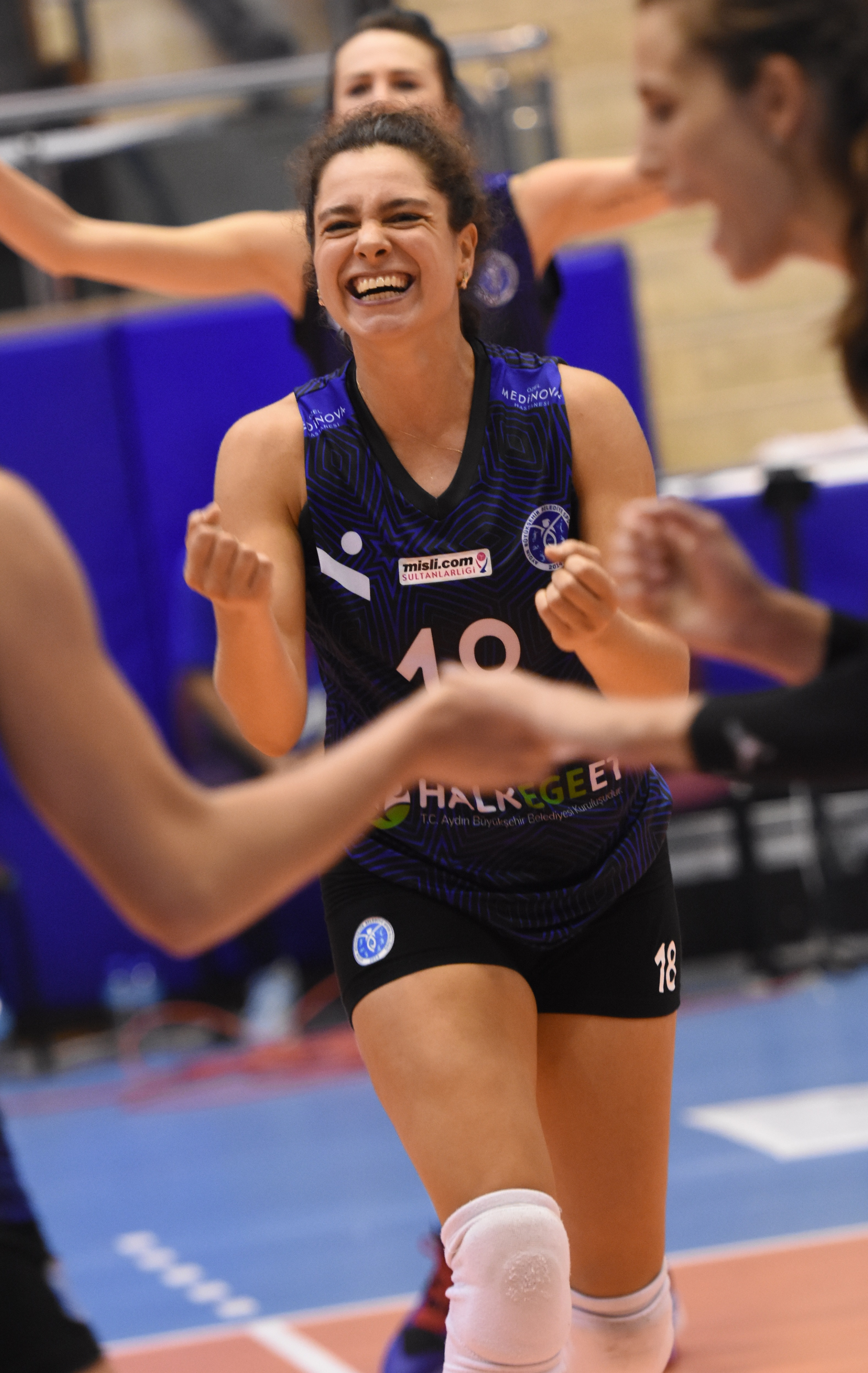

Personal information
- Nationality: Turkish
- Born: 6 April 1990 (age 36); Istanbul, Turkey
- Height: 1.78 m (5 ft 10 in)
- Weight: 64 kg (141 lb)
- Spike: 280 cm (110 in)
- Block: 275 cm (108 in)

Volleyball information
- Position: Setter
- Current club: İBB Spor Kulübü

Career
Years	Teams
2007–2013; 2013–2014; 2014–2015; 2018–2020; 2020–2022; 2022–2023; 2023–2024; 2024–	Florida State University; Bursa Büyükşehir Belediyespor; Çanakkale Belediyespor; Nilüfer Belediyespor; Aydın Büyükşehir Belediyespor; Çukurova Belediyesi Adana Demirspor; Galatasaray HDI Sigorta; İBB Spor Kulübü

Duygu Düzceler (born 6 April 1990) is a Turkish volleyball player. She plays as setter for İBB Spor Kulübü.

== Career ==
Duygu Düzceler's career began in the youth sector of VakıfBank Güneş Sigorta, where she played before moving to the USA to pursue her studies, and played at university level in NCAA Division I with Florida State University, from 2009 to 2012. As soon as she completed her university commitments, in January 2013 she signed her first professional contract in the Turkish cadet division, playing the second part of the 2012–13 championship with Salihli.

Duygu Düzceler debuted in Voleybol 1. Ligi in the 2013–14 season, signed by Bursa Büyükşehir Belediyespor: she remained tied to the club for two years, winning the 2014–15 Challenge Cup. In the 2015–16 championship she moved to Çanakkale Belediyespor, while in the following championship he moved to Nilüfer Belediyespor for two years .

In the 2018–19 season she arrived at Aydın Büyükşehir Belediyespor: shortly after the start of the 2020–21 season she get injured, breaking the anterior cruciate ligament of her right knee, thus being forced to undergo surgery and a long stop.

=== Galatasaray HDI Sigorta ===
On 8 July 2023, she signed a 1 + 1-year contract with Galatasaray HDI Sigorta.

== Awards ==
=== Clubs ===
- 2014–15 CEV Women's Challenge Cup Champion, with Bursa Büyükşehir Belediyespor
- 2018–19 CEV Women's Challenge Cup Runner-Up, with Aydın Büyükşehir Belediyespor
