= Melisa Sazalan =

Turkish volleyball player

Personal information
- Full name: Melisa Sazalan
- Born: September 29, 2006 (age 20); Turkey
- Height: 1.86 m (6 ft 1 in)
- Spike: 296 cm (117 in)
- Block: 285 cm (112 in)

Volleyball information
- Position: Outside Hitter
- Current club: Galatasaray

Career
Years	Teams
2019–2022	Arkas Spor
2022–2023	Galatasaray ll
2023–2024	Galatasaray Daikin
2024–2025	Papara Göztepe
2025–	Galatasaray Daikin
2025–	→ Bodrum Belediyesi Bodrumspor

National team
Turkey

Melisa Sazalan (born September 29, 2006) is a Turkish professional volleyball player who plays as an Outside Hitter for Bodrum Belediyesi Bodrumspor.

== Club career ==
=== Galatasaray ===
Born in 2006 and trained in the Arkas Spor infrastructure, Sazalan was transferred to the Galatasaray team in September 2022.

=== Göztepe ===
She signed a 1–year contract with Papara Göztepe on July 3, 2024.

=== Bodrum Belediyesi Bodrumspor (loan) ===
In the statement made by Galatasaray on August 17, 2025, it was announced that she will play on loan at Bodrum Belediyesi Bodrumspor until the end of the 2025–26 season.
