= İrem Nur Özsoy =

Turkish volleyball player

Personal information
- Full name: İrem Nur Özsoy
- Born: June 13, 2003 (age 23) İzmir, Turkey
- Height: 1.60 m (5 ft 3 in)
- Weight: 60 kg (130 lb)
- Spike: 255 cm (100 in)
- Block: 240 cm (94 in)

Volleyball information
- Position: Libero
- Current club: Aydın Büyükşehir Belediyespor

Career
- Years: Team
- 2019–2021; 2021–2022; 2022–2026; 2024–2025; 2026–: Arkas Spor; Galatasaray ll; Galatasaray; → Aydın Büyükşehir Belediyespor; Aydın Büyükşehir Belediyespor

National team
- Years: Team
- Turkey

İrem Nur Özsoy (born June 13, 2003, in İzmir, Turkey) is a Turkish female volleyball player. She is 160 cm (5.2 ft) tall at 60 kg (130 lb) and plays in the Libero position.

== Career ==
She started her volleyball career at Arkas Spor.

=== Galatasaray ===
She was transferred to Galatasaray youth team in 2021 and completed her career in the A team squad in 2022.

She signed a 2-year contract with Galatasaray on 21 June 2023.

=== Aydın Büyükşehir Belediyespor (loan) ===
On June 3, 2024, she signed a 1-year temporary contract with Aydın Büyükşehir Belediyespor.

=== Return to Galatasaray ===
On July 1, 2025, she signed a new 1-year contract with Galatasaray.

== Honours ==
=== Clubs ===
- 2025–26 CEV Cup Champion, with Galatasaray
