= Zeynep Sude Demirel =

Turkish volleyball player (born 2000)

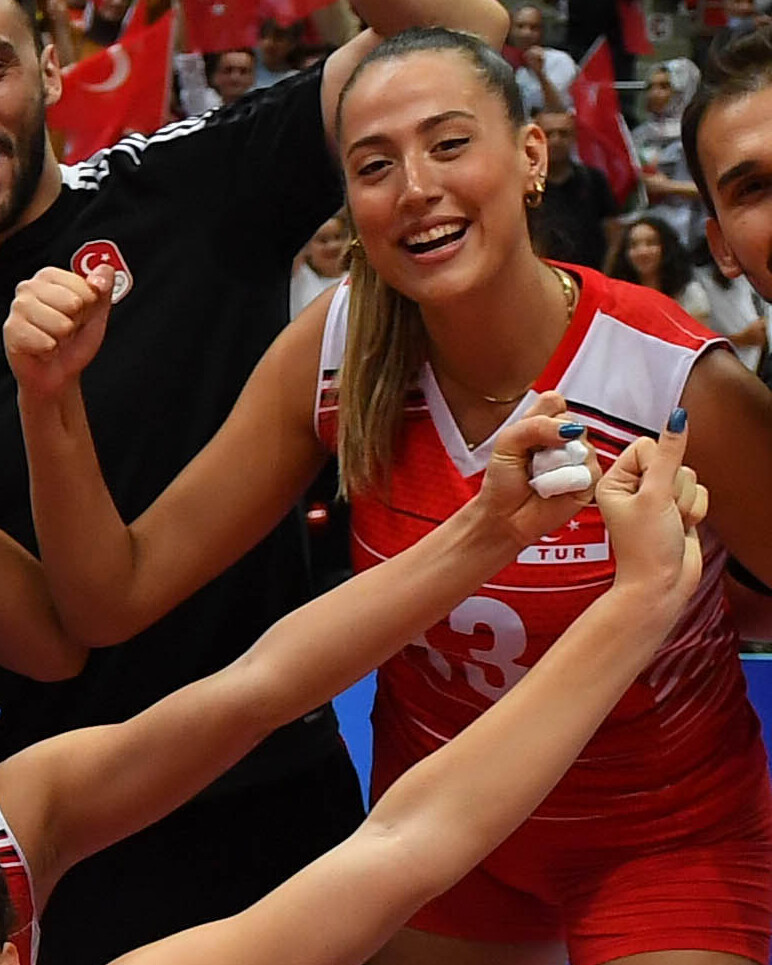
- Zeynep Sude Demirel of Turkey national team at the 2022 FIVB World Championship.

Personal information
- Full name: Zeynep Sude Demirel
- Born: 27 November 2000 (age 25) İzmit, Turkey
- Height: 1.98 m (6 ft 6 in) →
- Weight: 80 kg (180 lb)
- Spike: 308 cm (121 in)
- Block: 300 cm (120 in)

Volleyball information
- Position: Middle blocker
- Current club: Göztepe
- Number: 13

Career
- Years: Team
- 2018–2019; 2019–2020; 2020–2021; 2021–2022; 2022–2023; 2023–2024; 2024–2025; 2025–2026; 2026–: Büyükçekmece Voleybol Akademisi; Çanakkale Bld.; Yeşilyurt; Galatasaray HDI Sigorta; Türk Hava Yolları; VakıfBank; →Aydın BB; Beşiktaş; Göztepe

National team
- Years: Team
- Turkey
Honours
Women's volleyball
Representing Turkey
Islamic Solidarity Games
Gold medal – first place	2021 Konya	Team

Zeynep Sude Demirel (born 27 November 2000) is a Turkish volleyball player. She is 198 cm (6.50 ft) tall and 80 kg (180 lb), and plays as a middle blocker. She plays in the topflight Turkish Women's Volleyball League for Göztepe.

== Club career ==
Demirel stands at 1.98 m (6 ft 6 in), weighs 80 kg (180 lb) and is a middle blocker. She played for Büyükçekmece Voleybol Akademisi, Çanakkale Bld. and Yeşilyurt. On 22 April 2021, she signed a one-year contract with the Galatatasaray team. For the 2024–25 League season, she was loaned out from VakıfBank to Aydın BB. She ten joined Beşiktaş. In May 2026, she signed with the İzmir-based club Göztepe for the 2026–27 League season.

=== Incident ===
Demirel was angered by a mistake her teammate Margarita Kurillo made in the final moments of the 2025–26 League season's hpme match of her team Beşiktaş against Aydın BB, which her team lost by 2-3. After the game ended, she physically confronted her teammate on the court. The club imposed an administrative fine of ₺400,000 (approximately US$9,300) on her after reviewing the incident and considering the defenses presented. The amount of the fine was considered a record.

== International career ==
=== Turkey U21 ===
Demirel played for national U21 team at the 2019 FIVB Volleyball Women's U20 World Championship in Mexico, which finished fourth.

=== Turkey ===
Demirel was part of the national team at the 2021 Islamic Solidarity Games in Konya, Turkey, which won the gold medal.

She took part at the 2022 FIVB Women's Volleyball World Championship in the Netherlands. The team finished at eight place.
