= Ünzile Nur Hacıoğlu =

Turkish volleyball player (born 1999)

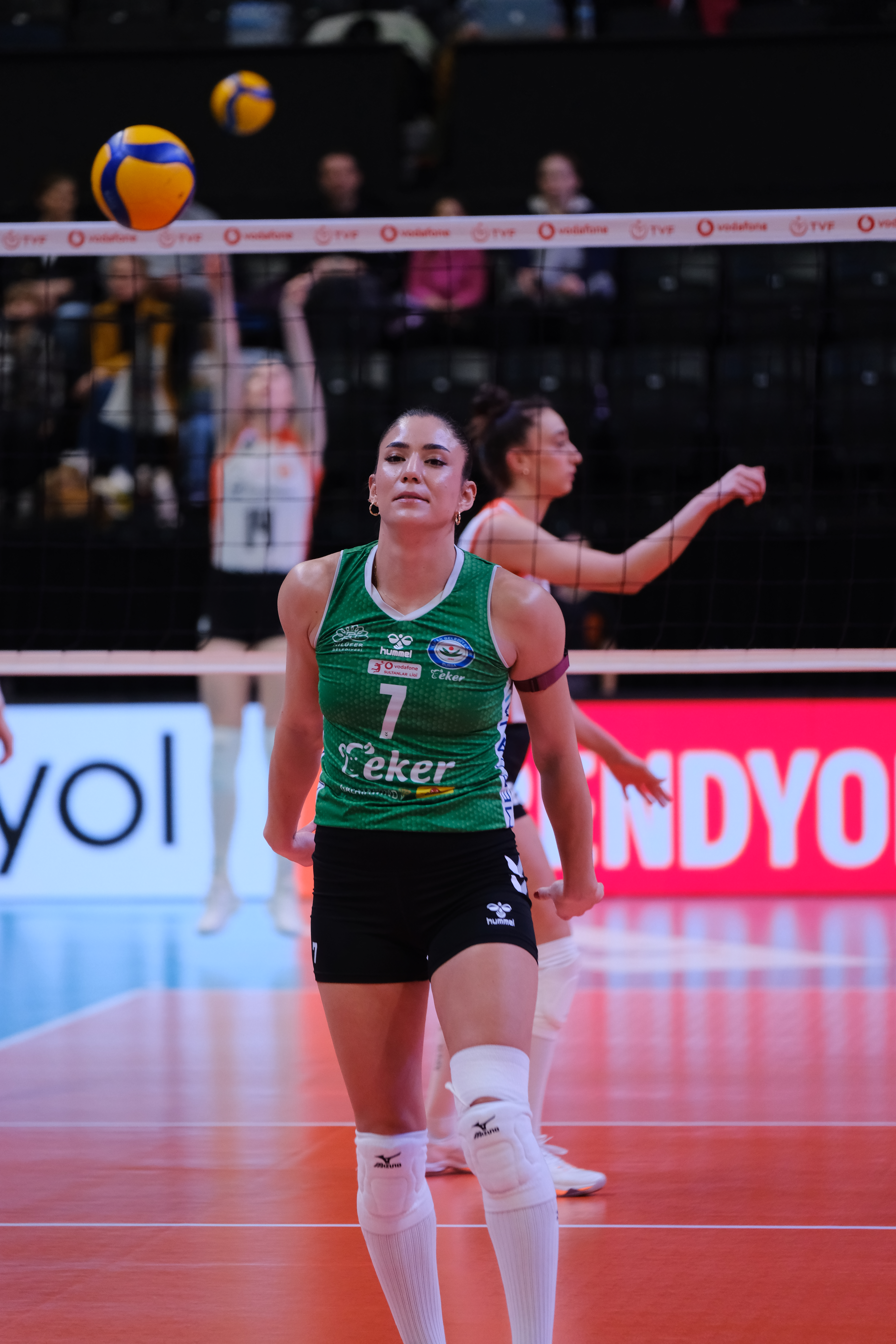
- Ünzile Nur Hacıoğlu (#7)of [Nilüfer Bld. (2026)

Personal information
- Full name: Ünzile Nur Hacıoğlu
- Born: Ünzile Nur Cansız; 19 July 1999 (age 27) Eskişehir, Turkey
- Height: 180 cm (5 ft 11 in)
- Weight: 73 kg (161 lb)
- Spike: 300 cm (118 in)
- Block: 285 cm (112 in)

Volleyball information
- Position: Middle blocker
- Current club: Aydın BB

Career
- Years: Team
- 2015–2016: Eskişehir DSİ Bentspor
- 2017–2020: Anadolu Üniversitesi
- 2020–2022: Kayseri OSB Teknik Koleji
- 2022–2024: Yeşilyurt
- 2023–2024: Istanbul BB
- 2024–2025: Göztepe
- 2025–2026: Nilüfer Bld.
- 2026–2027: Aydın BB

Ünzile Nur Hacıoğlu (née Cansız; born 19 July 1999) is a Turkish professional volleyball player. She plays as middle blocker in the Turkish Women's Volleyball League for Aydın BB.

== Club career ==
Hacıoğlu stands at 180 cm (5 ft 11 in) tall and weighs 73 kg (161 lb). She has a spike height of 300 cm (9 ft 10 in) and a block height of 285 cm (9 ft 4 in). She plays in the middle blocker position.

Hacıoğlu started playing volleyball at an early age. She became a member of the Eskişehir DSİ Bentspor in her hometown. In 2015, at the age of fifteen, she played a major role in the championship victory in playoff matches of her team in the Regional League, and in the subsequent promotion of her team. Thus, she caught the attention of many Second-League club coaches, and received transfer offers. She did not accept the offers after taking her education into account. After playing for Anadolu Üniversitesi in Eskişehir, she transferred to OSB Teknik Koleji from Kayseri in July 2020. In May 2021, her contract was extended for one season. She played for the First-League-club Yeşilyurt in Istanbul during the 2022–23 season. In May 2023, her contract was renewed for one season. Having dual license, she played both for Yeşilyurt and Istanbul BB in the 2023–24 season, First League season. In May 2024, Hacıoğlu transferred to the Izmir-based club Göztepe for the 2024–25 First League season. In the 2025–26 Volleyball League season, she played for Nilüfer Belediyespor in Bursa. At the end of the Sultans League season, the club released her from her contract. In July 2026, she signed a one-year contract with Aydın BB to play in the 2026–27 Sultans League season.

== Personal life ==
Hacıoğlu was born on 19 July 1999 in Eskişehir.
