= Zhuang Yushan =

Chinese volleyball player (born 2003)

Personal information
- Full name: Zhuang Yushan
- Nationality: Chinese
- Born: 28 April 2003 (age 23) Fujian, China
- Height: 1.84 m (6 ft 0 in)
- Spike: 315 cm (124 in)
- Block: 310 cm (120 in)

Volleyball information
- Position: Outsite hitter
- Current club: Göztepe
- Number: 2

Career
- Years: Team
- 2021–2023; 2024; 2024–2025; 2025–2026; 2026–: Fujian Anxi Tiekuanyin; Honda Olivero S.Bernardo Cuneo; Fujian Anxi Tiekuanyin; Omag-Mt San Giovanni in Marignano; Göztepe

National team
- Years: Team
- 2022–2023; 2022–2023: China U21; China
Honours
Women's volleyball
Representing China
AVC Continental Championship
Silver medal – second place	2026 Tianjin	Team
AVC Cup
Silver medal – second place	2022 Pasig	Team
Summer World University Games
Gold medal – first place	2021 Chengdu	Team

Zhuang Yushan (Chinese: 庄宇珊; born 28 April 2003 in Fujian) is a Chinese volleyball player. She is an outside hitter. She played for the Chiana national U21 and Chiana national teams. She plays in the topflight Turkish Volleyball League for Göztepe.

== Club career ==
Zhuang started her volleyball career with Fujian Anxi Tiekuanyin in the 2021–22 Chinese Super League season. After three seasons, she moved to Italy, and signed a deal with Honda Olivero S.Bernardo Cuneo in February 2024 valid for the remainder of the 2023–24 Italian League season until the end of the season. Returned home, she rejoined her hometown club Fujian Anxi Tiekuanyin. In November 2025, she went to Italy again, and signed with Omag-Mt San Giovanni in Marignano for the 2025–26 Italian League season. In April 2026, Zhuang moved to Turkey and signed with the İzmir-based club Göztepe to play in the topflight Volleyball League.

== International career ==
=== China U19 ===
In 2019, she was called up to the national U19 team, and played at the 2019 FIVB Volleyball Girls' U18 World Championship in Egypt ranking fourth.

=== China U21 ===
In 2022, she played for the national U21 team that won the 2023 FIVB Women's U21 World Championship in Mexico, where she was named both MVP and "Best Outside Hitter".

=== China ===
In 2022, she received her first call-ups to the senior national team that same year, she won the silver medal at the 2022 AVC Cup for Women in Pasig, Philippines. She captured the gold medal at the 2021 Summer World University Games in Chengdu, Sichuan, China, which was held in 2023 due to the COVID-19 pandemic in China. She played at the FIVB Women's Volleyball Nations League of 2024 in Bangkok, Thailand (fifth place), 2025 in Łódź, Poland (fifth place), 2026 in Macau, China (fourth place), as well as at the 2025 FIVB World Championship in Thailand (ninth place).

== Personal life ==
Zhuang Yushan was born in Fujian, Zhangzhou, China on 28 April 2003.

== Honours ==
=== Internatiomal ===
Chiana U21
(gold) Champions (1):

2023 FIVB Women's U21 World Championship

China

(gold) Champions (1)
2021 Summer World University Games
(silver) Runners-up (1)
2022 AVC Cup

=== Individual ===
Most Valuable Player (1)
2023 FIVB Women's U21 World Championship
Best Outside Hitter (1)
2023 FIVB Women"s U21 World Chaöpipnshio

- 2026 AVC Continental Championship – "Best outside spikers"
