= Simay Kurt =

Turkish volleyball player (born 2000)

Personal information
- Nationality: Turkey
- Born: 29 July 2000 (age 26); Turkey
- Height: 173 cm (5 ft 8 in)
- Weight: 68 kg (150 lb)
- Spike: 285 cm (112 in)
- Block: 260 cm (100 in)

Volleyball information
- Position: Libero
- Current club: Beşiktaş

Career
Years
- 2016–2020
- 2020–2022
- 2022–2024
- 2024–2026
- 2026–
Teams
- Beylikdüzü Voleybol İhtisas
- PTT Spor
- Sarıyer Bld.
- Aras Kargo
- Beşiktaş

National team
- 2016–2019
- 2019
- 2026
- Turkey U19
- Turkey U21
- Turkey
Honours
Women's volleyball
Representing Turkey
Mediterranean Games
Gold medal – first place	2026 Taranto	Team
Balkan Championships
Gold medal – first place	2019 Ankara	Team U19

Simay Kurt (born 29 July 2000) is a Turkish profeessional volleyball player. She is 173 cm (5 ft 8 in) tall at 68 kg (150 lb) and plays in the libero position. She has 285 cm (112 in) spike height and 260 cm (100 in) block height. She plays for Beşiktaş.

== Club career ==
Kurt started her volleyball career at Beylikdüzü Voleybol İhtisas in Istanbul, where she grew up in the youth system. She then played for PTT Spor in Ankara. In April 2022, she returned to Istanbul, and signed with Sarıyer Bld.. In April 2024, she joined Aras Kargo in İzmir, which was recently promoted to play in the topflight Sultans League. In May 2025, her contract was extended for one more season. In May 2026, she transferred to Beşiktaş in Istanbul to replace the leaving libero Buse Kayacan Sonsırma.

== International career ==
=== Turkey U19 ===
Kurt was selected to the national U19 team in December 2016. She played at the 2017 FIVB Girls' U18 World Championship in Argentina. The team lost the third-place match against Russia. She played at the 2018 Women's U19 European Championship in Albania, where the team ranked fourth. She won the gold medal at the 2019 Balkan Women's U19 Volleyball Championship in Ankara, Turkey.

=== Turkey U21 ===
She took the silver medal at the 2019 International Volleyball Challenge U21. She was part of th national U20 team, which took the fourth place at the 2019 FIVB Women's U20 World Championship in Mexico after losing the bronze-medal game to Russia.

=== Turkey ===
She captured the gold medal at the 2026 Mediterranean Games in Taranto, Italy.
