= Merve Atlıer =

Turkish volleyball player (born 2000)

- Merve Atlıer of Beşiktaş (2026)

Personal information
- Nationality: Turkish
- Born: 31 March 2000 (age 26); Bursa, Turkey
- Height: 191 cm (6 ft 3 in)
- Weight: 75 kg (165 lb)
- Spike: 310 cm (122 in)
- Block: 305 cm (120 in)

Volleyball information
- Position: Middle blocker
- Current club: Beşiktaş

Career
Years
- 2014
- 2014–2018
- 2018–2019
- 2019–2020
- 2020–2022
- 2022–2024
- 2024–2026
- 2026–
Teams
- Nilüfer Bld. Youth
- Eczacıbaşı Youth
- Eczacıbaşı VitrA
- Karayolları
- Eczacıbaşı Dynavit
- →Kuzeyboru
- Aras Kargo
- Beşiktaş

National team
2017	Turkey U18
2017	Turkey U19
2019	Turkey U21
2026–	Turkey
Honours
Women's volleyball
Representing Turkey
Mediterranean Games
Gold medal – first place	2026 Taranto	Team

Merve Atlıer (born 31 March 2000) is a Turkish volleyball player. She plays in the Turkish Women's Volleyball League for Beşiktaş as middle blocker. She appeared in the national U18, U19 and U21 teams before she was selected to the senior women's team.

== Club career ==
Atlıer started playing volleyball at an early age entering in the youth team of Nilüfer Bld. in her hometown. At the age of fourteen, she moved to Istanbul, and joined Eczacıbaşı Volleyball youth team, where she continued her development. At the age of eighteen, she became professional, and debuted in the topflight Sultans League with Eczacıbaşı VitrA. She then played in the Sultans League for Karayolları in Ankara before she returned to her former club, renamed to Eczacıbaşı Dynavit, in May 2020. In May 2022, she was loaned out to Kuzeyboru in Aksaray in order to increase match experience. After two seasons, she transferred in April 2024 to the İzmir-based club Aras Kargo, which was newly promoted to the Sultans League. In May 2026, she left Aras Kargo, and joined Beşiktaş in Istanbul for the 2026–27 Turkish Women's Volleyball League season.

She is 191 cm (6 ft 3 in) tall and plays in the middle blocker position.

== International career ==
Atlıer was selected to the national U18 team to play at the 2017 Girls' U18 Volleyball European Championship held in Arnhem, Netherlands.

With the national U19 team, she became champion at the 2019 BVA Girls'U19 Balkan Volleyball Championship in Ankara, Turkey.

As part of the national U21 team, she played at the 2019 FIVB Volleyball Women's U20 World Championship in Mexico. Her team ranked fourth, and she was named one of the two "Best Middle blocker"s.

She is a member of Turkey women's national volleyball team. She was called up for the 2026 FIVB Women's Volleyball Nations League. She captured the gold medal at the 2026 Mediterranean Games in Taranto, Italy.

== Personal life ==
Merve ATlıer was born in Bursa, Turkey on 31 March 2000.

== Honours ==
=== Club ===
Sultans League
(silver) (1): 2018–19 (Eczacıbaşı VitrA)
(bronze) (1): 2021–22 (Eczacıbaşı Dynavit)

Turkish Women's Volleyball Super Cup
(gold) (1): 2018 (Eczacıbaşı VitrA)
(silver) (1): 2021 (Eczacıbaşı Dynavit)

Turkish Women's Volleyball Cup,
(gold) (1): 2018–19 (Eczacıbaşı VitrA)
(silver) (1): 2020–21 (Eczacıbaşı Dynavit)
(bronze) (1): 2021–22 (Eczacıbaşı Dynavit)

FIVB Women's Volleyball Club World Championship
(bronze) (1): 2018 (Eczacıbaşı VitrA)

Women's CEV Cup
(gold) (1): 2021–22 (Eczacıbaşı Dynavit)

=== International ===
Turkey U18

Balkan U18 Championship
(silver) (1): 2018

Turkey U19

Balkan U19 Championship
(gold) (1): 2019

Turkey U21

International Volleyball Challenge U21
(silver) (1): 2019

Turkey

Mediterranean Ganes
(gold) (1): 2026

=== Individual ===
Best Middle blocker (1)
2019 FIVB Volleyball Women's U20 World Championship
