= Rebecca Latham =

American volleyball player

Personal information
- Full name: Rebecca Kay Latham
- Nickname: Becca
- Nationality: (United States) American
- Born: June 23, 1997 (age 29); Austin, United States
- Height: 1.91 m (6 ft 3 in)
- Weight: 81 kg (179 lb)
- Education: Denver Pioneers

Volleyball information
- Position: Opposite hitter
- Current club: (Turkey) Göztepe

Career
Years
- 2019–2021
- 2021–2022
- 2022–2023
- 2022–2024
- 2024–2025
- 2024–2025
- 2025–2026
- 2026–
Teams
- (Italy) Futura Volley Giovani Busto Arsizio
- (South Korea) Hwaseong IBK Altos
- (Greece) ASP Thetis
- (Greece) AO Markópoulo Revoil
- (Greece) Athletes Unlimited Pro League
- (Puerto Rico) Mets de Guaynabo
- (South Korea) Incheon Heungkuk Life Pink Spiders
- (Turkey) Göztepe

National team
United States

Rebecca Latham (born June 23, 1997) is an American volleyball player, originally from Austin, Texas, United States who has played in Italy, South Korea and is currently playing in Turkey for Göztepe.

== Early years ==
Latham began playing volleyball at the age of eight, and continued training and competing at McNeil High School and Austin Junior Volleyball Club in Austin, Texas. She was later recruited to play for University of Denver, where she played as an Opposite in the Denver Pioneers for all four years during her college education.

== Club career ==
After graduation, Latham played for Futura Giovani Busto Arsizio in Italy,n, Hwaseong IBK Altos in South Korea, ASP Thetis, AO Markopoulo Revoil and Athletes Unlimited Pro League in Greece, Mets de Guaynabo in Puerto Rico, and lastly, Incheon Heungkuk Life Pink Spiders again in South Korea. In June 2026, she moved to Turkey, and joined the İzmir-based club Göztepe to play in the 2026–27 Turkish Women's Volleyball League.
