= Marina Markova =

Russian volleyball player (born 2001)

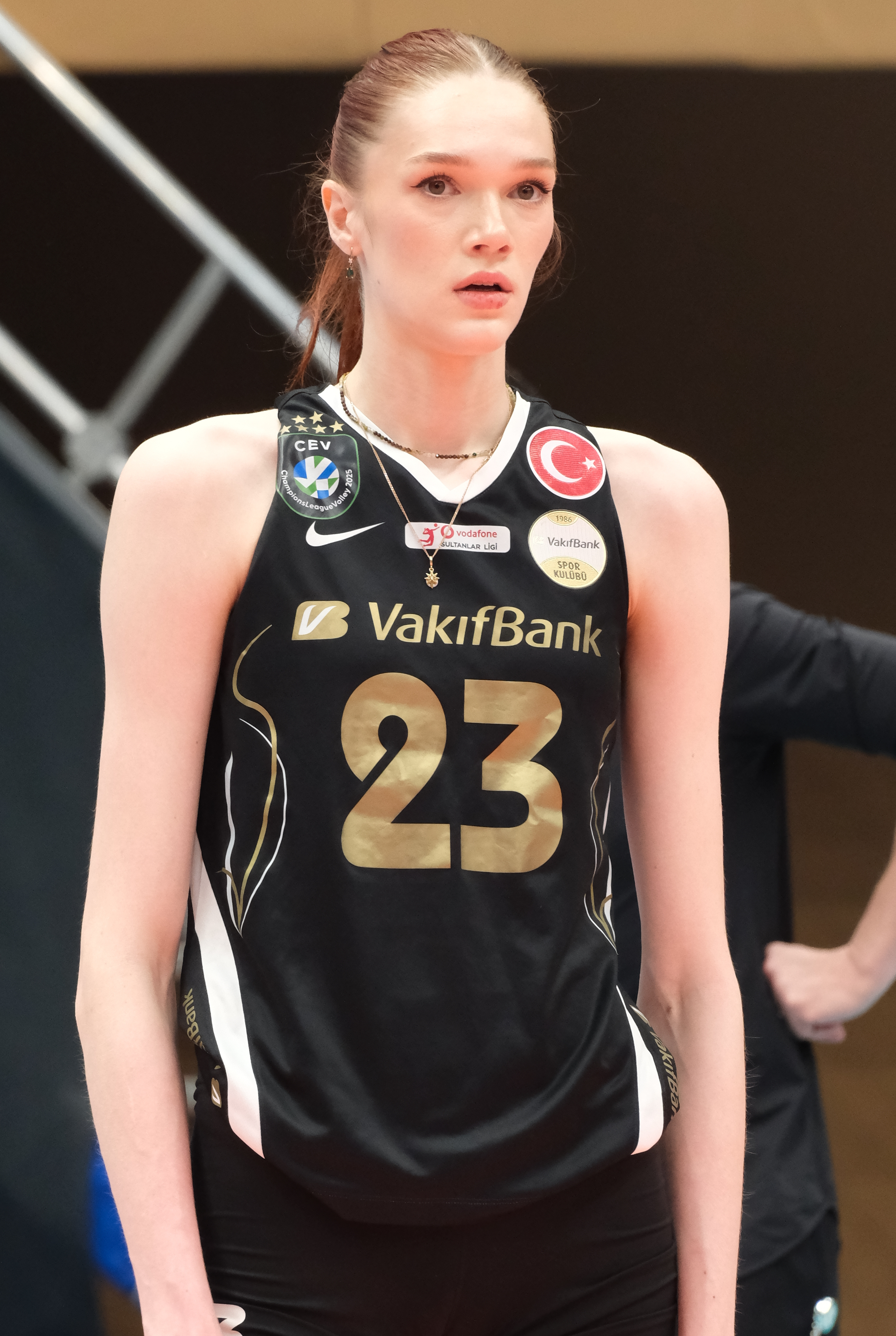

Personal information
- Full name: Marina Alekseevna Markova
- Born: January 27, 2001 (age 25) Saint Petersburg, Russia
- Height: 2.00 m (6 ft 6 1/2 in)
- Weight: 74 kg (163 lb)
- Spike: 345 cm (136 in)
- Block: 332 cm (131 in)

Volleyball information
- Position: Outside hitter
- Current club: VakıfBank

Career
- Years: Team
- 2016-2019; 2019-2022; 2022-2023; 2023-2024; 2023-2024; 2023-2024; 2024-: Leningradka Saint Petersburg; Syracuse University; University of Florida; Muratpaşa Belediyespor; Igor Gorgonzola Novara; VW Jakarta Elektrik PLN; VakıfBank

Marina Alekseevna Markova (Russian: Марина Алексеевна Маркова, born January 27, 2001 in Saint Petersburg, Russia) is a Russian volleyball player. She is 200 cm (6.6 ft) tall at 74 kg (163 lb) and plays in the outside hitter position. She plays for VakıfBank of the CEV Champions League and Sultanlar Ligi.

== Career ==
She started her career with Leningradka Saint Petersburg in 2016, up until 2019.

Then she went to the USA for her college career and played for Syracuse University between 2019-2022, and for the Florida Gators women's volleyball in the 2022-2023 season.

She signed with Turkish Sultanlar Ligi team Muratpaşa Belediyespor from Antalya for 2023–24 season. She also played for Serie A team Igor Gorgonzola Novara and Indonesia Proliga team VW Jakarta Elektrik PLN before transferring to VakıfBank in the 2024–25 Sultanlar Ligi season.

== Honours ==
=== Club ===
(United States) University of Florida

- Southeastern Conference: 2022–23

(Italy) Igor Gorgonzola Novara

- CEV Challenge Cup: 2023–24

(Turkey) VakıfBank

- Sultanlar Ligi: 2024–25, 2025–26

=== Individual ===
- 2022 AVCA Third Team All-American
- 2022 AVCA All-Southeast Region selection
- 2022 All-SEC Team
- 2023-24 Indonesia Proliga best server
- 2024-25 Turkish Cup best attacker
- 2024-25 Turkish Cup best scorer
- 2025-26 Turkish League MVP
- 2025-26 Turkish League MVP
