= Aras Kargo SK =

Turkish women's volleyball club

Aras Kargo Spor Kulübü
- Founded: October 2023; 3 years ago
- Ground: İzmir Atatürk Volleyball Hall, İzmir (Capacity: 6,000)
- League: Sultans League
- 2025–26: 6th

Uniforms
Home	Away

Aras Kargo SK (Turkish: Aras Kargo Spor Kulübü) is a Turkish professional women's volleyball club based in İzmir that plays in the top-level Sultans League.

== History ==
Aras Kargo SK was founded as a women's volleyball club by the İzmir-based package delivery company Aras Kargo in October 2023. The club colors are red and white.

The team started to play in the second-tier Turkish Women's Volleyball First League in the 2023–24 season. At the end of the season, they defearted their opponent in the second final match, and were promoted to the top-level Sultanlar League in the 2024–25 season.

== Arena ==
Aras Kargo play their home matches at İzmir Atatürk Volleyball Hall, which has a seating capacity of 6,000.

== Current squad ==
2025-26 season:

Head coach:

No.	Pos.	Player	Date of birth and age	Height (m)
1	L	(Turkey) Simay Kurt	29 July 2000 (age 26)	1.73
2	OH	(Turkey) Buse Kara Cılkız	30 August 1998 (age 28)	1.80
5	MB	(Turkey) Merve Atlıer	31 March 2000 (age 26)	1.91
6	MB	(Turkey) Özge Nur Çetiner	6 August 1993 (age 33)	1.93
7	S	(Turkey) İrem Çör	21 September 1996 (age 30)	1.80
9	MB	(Turkey) Nisan Eroğuz	11 April 2006 (age 20)	1.86
10	L	(Turkey) Sude Taşbaş	1 November 2002 (age 24)	1.78
11	S	(Turkey) Aslıhan Kılıç	21 April 1998 (age 28)	1.79
14	OP	(Canada) Anna Smrek	11 October 2003 (age 23)	2.05
15	MB	(Turkey) Hazal Selin Uygur	18 August 1992 (age 34)	1.86
19	OP	(Turkey) Defne Başyolcu	9 August 2006 (age 20)	1.93
25	OH	(Cuba) Diaris Pérez	16 November 1998 (age 27)	1.82
27	OH	(Georgia (country)) [Ana Kalandadze	10 December 1998 (age 27)	1.87
55	OH	(Colombia) Ana Karina Olaya	13 September 2002 (age 24)	1.87
91	OP	(Greece) Martha Anthouli	13 August 2004 (age 22)	2.02

== Former notable players ==
Turkey

- Merve Atlıer
- Büşra Güneş
- Simay Kurt
