= İzmir Atatürk Volleyball Hall =

Volleyball venue in İzmir, Turkey

Izmir Atatürk Volleyball Hall
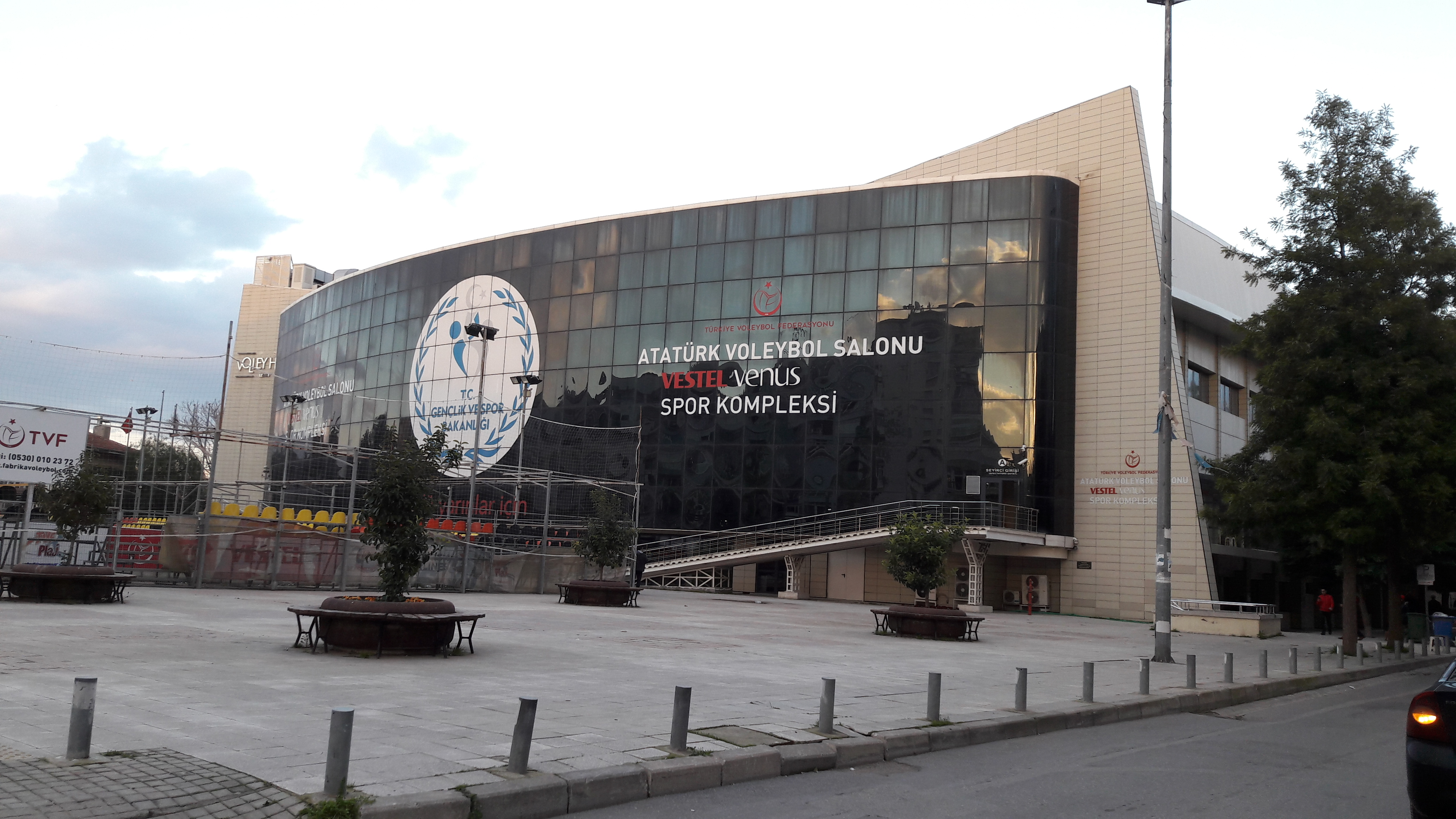
- Interactive map of Izmir Atatürk Volleyball Hall
- Former names: Izmir Atatürk Sports Hall
- Coordinates: 38°26′1″N 27°8′53″E
- Capacity: 5,500
- Type: Arena
- Event: Sporting events
- Public transit: Alsancak Station, İZBAN

Construction
- Built: 1971
- Renovated: 2012
- Expanded: 2012

Tenants
- Altınordu Voleybal; Aras Kargo; Göztepe
- Arkas K.S.K. BAL Spor: 2001-2026; 1971-2005; 2010-2026

İzmir Atatürk Volleyball Hall (Turkish: İzmir Atatürk Voleybol Salonu), later renamed to TVF Atatürk Volleyball Hall Vestel Venus Arena (Turkish: TVF Atatürk Voleybol Salonu Vestel Venus Arena) for sponsorship reasons, is a volleyball venue located in the Alsancak Neighborhood of Konak District in İzmir, Turkey.

Designed by Architect Harbi Hotan, the venue was built in 1971 to host some competitions of the 1971 Mediterranean Games held in İzmir. After hosting various indoor sport competitions, it was rebuilt for volleyball matches. The hall underwent a comprehensive renovation by the Turkish Volleyball Federation (TVF( in 2012. It has a seating capacity of 5,500. The building features six dressing rooms, four referee rooms, one doping control room, 80-person press center and cafeteria.

The arena is home to the İzmir-based volleyball teams playing in the second-tşer Turkish Women's Volleyball First League and the topflight Turkish Women's Volleyball League, including Altınordu Voleybol, Aras Kargo, Göztepe as well as in the second-tear Turkish Men's Volleyball First League and the Turkish Men's Volleyball League, including Arkas , Altekma.

The venue, named after the Turkish Volleyball Federation (TVF), was renamed to TVF Atatürk Volleyball Hall Vestel Venus Arena after a sponsorhip agreement was reached with the Turkish home and professional appliances manufacturing company Vestel in the beginning of the 2026–27 Turkish Women's Volleyball League season.

== International events hosted ==
The arena hosted some competitions of the The venue was built in 1971 to host some competitions of the 1971 Mediterranean Games, basketball games of the 2005 Summer Universiade and 15 games of the Group B in the preliminary round of the Eurobasket 2005 Women from September 2 to 7 2005.

- 2013 FIVB Men's Junior World Championship 22 August-1 September
- 2015 Women's European Volleyball League - Leg 4 and 5 21-30 August 2015

== See also ==
- List of indoor arenas in Turkey
