= İlayda Alkan =

Turkish volleyball player (born 1998)

Personal information
- Nationality: Turkish
- Born: 24 February 1998 (age 28) İzmir, Turkey
- Height: 1.85 m (6 ft 1 in)

Volleyball information
- Position: Middle blocker
- Current club: Hatay Volleybol
- Number: 2

Career
- Years: Team
- 2014–2018; 2019; 2019–2023; 2023–2024; 2024–2025; 2025–; –: Arkas; Edremit Bld.; Göztepe; Kapaklı Site; Manisa BB; Hatay Voleybol
Honours
Representing Turkey
Women's volleyball
Deaflympics
| Silver medal – second place | 2025 Tokyo | Team |
| Gold medal – first place | 2021 Caxias do Sul | Team |
World Championships
| Gold medal – first place | 2021 Chianciano Terme | Team |
European Championships
| Silver medal – second place | 2023 Karabük | Team |

İlayda Alkan (born 24 February 1998) is a Turkish female deaf volleyball player. She plays in the middle biocker position.

== Club career ==
Alkan became interested in sports by attending volleyball matches of her older sister Nazlı Alkan. She so started playing volleyball with the encouragement of her sister's coaches and her family.

In the 2014–15 season, she joined Arkas in her hometown. In 2019, after four seasons, she played a while at Edremit Bld. in Balıkesir, and then transferred to her hometown-based club Göztepe, where her sister was serving as team captain. She last played for Göztepe in the 2022–23 Turkish First Volleyball League. In May 2023, she moved to Tekirdağ and joined Kapaklı Site for the 2023–24 season. After one season, she transferred to Manisa BB. In the 2025–26 season, she joined Hatay Voleybol.

She is 1.85 m (6 ft 1 in) tall and plays in the middle blocker position.

== International career ==
Alkan is a member of the Turkey women's national deaf volleyball team. She captured the gold medal with her team at the 2021 World Deaf Volleyball Championships in Chianciano Terme, Italy. She competed at the Summer Deaflympics. With her team, she won the gold medal at the 2021 Caxias do Sul Deaflympics in Brazil, which took place in 2022. In 2023, she won the silver medal at the 11th European Deaf Volleyball Championships in Karabük, Turkey. She won the silver medal at the 2025 Tokyo Deaflympics in Japan.

== Personal life ==
İlayda Alkan was born on 24 February 1998. Her two-year older sister Nazlı Alkan is also a professional volleyball player.

She suffered hearing loss as a result of a seizure she contracted at a young age, and has had to live her life with a 52% hearing impairment.
