= Göztepe S.K. (women's volleyball) =

Women's volleyball club in Turkey

Göztepe S.K. Women's volleyball
- Full name: Göztepe Spor Kulübü Kadın Voleybol Takımı
- Short name: Papara Göztepe
- Founded: 1962; 64 years ago
- Ground: İzmir Atatürk Volleyball Hall
- Manager: (Bulgaria) Radoslav Arsov
- League: Turkish Women's Volleyball League
- 2025–26: 11th

Göztepe S.K. Women's Volleyball (Turkish: Göztepe Spor Kulübü Kadın Voleybol Takımı), also known as Papara Göztepe, is the women's volleyball team of the same named multi-sports club based in İzmir, western Turkey. The team competes in the Turkish Women's Volleyball League. Club colours are yellow and red.

== History ==
Göztepe women's volleyball team was formed in 1962. The women's branch represents across all youth age categories, conducts training sessions in five different halls to develop new athletes.

The team competed in the second-tier Turkish Women's Volleyball First League. In the 2024–25 season, the team secured a spot in the play-offs by finishing the regular season. as leaders, and subsequently earned promotion to the topflight Turkish Women's Volleyball League, widely known as "Sultans League", after finishing the play-off finals in second place.

=== 2026–27 season ===
At the end of the 2025–26 Turkish Women's Volleyball League season, the contract of the Turkish head coach Ataman Güneyligil was terminated by mutual agreement, and the club signed a deal with Radoslav Arsov from Bulgaria as head coach. The contracts of the Americans, outside hitter Kara Bajema, opposite hitter Sherridan Atkinson, middle blocker Kayla Haneline, French opposite hitter Amélie Rotar, Sloven outside hitter Lana Ščuka, Turkish players, middle blocker Emine Arıcı, setter Nazlı Eda Kafkas, opposite hitter Ceren Kapucu , middle blocker Ilayda Uçak , libero Nehir Kurtulan and libero Bihter Dumanoğlu were terminated by mutual agreement. For the 2026–27 Turkish Women's Volleyball League season, the team signed professional contract with outside hitter Eflin Burçin Toraman, libero Duru Zeren and middle blocker Sude Benli from the team's youth system, renewed contracts of the Turkish players, outside hitter Ezgi Bektaş, and setter Nursevil Gökbudak, recruited Chinese outside hitter Yushan Zhuang.

== Colors ==
The team wears the colors yellow and red as the club's colors.

== Arena ==
The team play their home matches at the 5,500-seating capacity İzmir Atatürk Volleyball Hall in Alsancak.

== Team roster 2026–27 ==
- Head coach: (Bulgaria) Radoslav Arsov

No.	Player	Date of Birth	Height (m)	Position	Country
1	Tuna Aybüke Özel	26 April 2002 (age 24)	1.62	Libero	Turkey
2	Zhuang Yushan	28 April 2003 (age 23)	1.84	Outside hitter	China
3	Duru Zeren	6 July 2009 (age 17)	1.72	Libero	Turkey
4	Melis Erdoğan	3 December 2010 (age 15)	1.87	Setter	Turkey
5	Kseniya Liabiodkina	18 February 2002 (age 24)	1.82	Opposite hitter	Belarus
7	Eflin Burçin Toraman	2011 (age 14–15)	1.76	Outside hitter	Turkey
10	Nursevil Gökbudak	28 November 1995 (age 30)	1.90	Setter	Turkey
11	Ezgi Bektaş	3 November 1993 (age 32)	1.84	Outside hitter	Turkey
12	Hande Naz Sunar	4 July 1995 (age 31)	1.87	Middle blocker	Turkey
13	Zeynep Sude Demirel	27 November 2000 (age 25)	1.98	Middle blocker	Turkey
14	Sude Benli	1 May 2008 (age 18)	1.86	Middle blocker	Turkey
17	Anna Astashina	24 September 2005 (age 20)	1.87	Setter	Russia
17	Rebecca Latham	23 June 1997 (age 29)	1.92	Opposite hitter	United States
21	Anna Prasolova	15 July 1999 (age 27)	1.90	Middle blocker	Russia
24	Olga Vaganova	19 February 2001 (age 25)	1.78	Outside hitter	Russia

== Former notable players ==
Belgium

- Hélène Rousseaux

Dominican Republic

- Madeline Guillén

Turkey

- İlayda Alkan
- Emine Arıcı
- Bihter Dumanoğlu
- Ünzile Nur Hacıoğlu
- Sude Hacımustafaoğlu
- Nazlı Eda Kafkas
- Ceren Kapucu
- Sude Hacımustafaoğlu
- Melisa Sazalan

United States

- Kara Bajema
- Kayla Haneline
