= Mets de Guaynabo =

Mets de Guaynabo may refer to several sport teams based in Guaynabo, Puerto Rico:

- Mets de Guaynabo (basketball), a team in the Baloncesto Superior Nacional
- Mets de Guaynabo (women's volleyball), a team in the Liga de Voleibol Superior Femenino
- Mets de Guaynabo (men's volleyball), a team in the Liga de Voleibol Superior Masculino
- Mets de Guaynabo (baseball), a team in the Liga de Béisbol Superior Doble A
