= 2024–25 Turkish Women's Volleyball League =

- League: Turkish Women's Volleyball League
- Sport: Volleyball
- Teams: 14

Regular season
- Season champions: Fenerbahçe Medicana

Final
- Champions: Vakıfbank S.K.
- Runners-up: Fenerbahçe Medicana
- Finals MVP: Cansu Özbay

Turkish Women's Volleyball League seasons
- ← 2023–24 2025–26 →

The 2024–25 Turkish Women's Volleyball League, branded as 2024–2025 Vodafone Sultans League (2024–2025 Vodafone Sultanlar Ligi in Turkish) is the 42nd edition of the top-level women's volleyball tournament of the Turkish Women's Volleyball League.

== Format ==
14 teams will compete in the regular season. 11 of the top 12 teams from 2023–24 Turkish Women's Volleyball League returned. Çukurova Belediyespor, one of the top 12 teams from the previous season, transferred their licence to Zeren Spor. The top 2 teams from the second-tier league (2023–2024 KFC Kadınlar 1. Ligi), Aras Kargo and Bahçelievler Belediyespor, joined the league. During the regular season, teams will compete in a double round-robin tournament with home-and-away fixtures. The bottom 2 teams will be relegated to play in the second-tier league next season. Final rankings for the top 8 will be determined with playoffs, with 5th-8th teams and the 1st-4th teams played in separate brackets. All playoff match-ups will be played as best-off-three series, except for the championship series which will be played best-off-five. The top three teams will qualify for the 2025–26 CEV Women's Champions League, while the 4th place team will qualify for the 2025–26 Women's CEV Cup, the 5th place team will qualify for the 2025–26 CEV Women's Challenge Cup, and the 6th place team will qualify for the 2025 Women's BVA Cup.

== Teams ==
Club	Head Coach	Captain	City	Colors
Aras Kargo	(Turkey) Suphi Doğancı	(Turkey) Gizem Mısra Aşçı	İzmir	
Aydın Büyükşehir Belediyespor	(Turkey) Alper Hamurcu	(Turkey) Fatma Şekerci	Aydın	
Bahçelievler Belediyespor	(Turkey) Kenan Uzun	(Turkey) Meryem Boz	Bahçelievler, Istanbul	
Beşiktaş JK	(Turkey) Recep Vatansever	(Serbia) Jovana Brakočević-Canzian	Istanbul	
Eczacıbaşı Dynavit	(Turkey) Ferhat Akbaş	(Serbia) Tijana Bošković	Istanbul	
Fenerbahçe Medicana	(Italy) Marco Fenoglio	(Turkey) Eda Erdem Dündar	Istanbul	
Galatasaray Daikin	(Spain) Guillermo Hernández	(Turkey) İlkin Aydın	Istanbul	
Keçiören Belediyesi SigortaShop	(Turkey) Cihan Çintay	(Turkey) Derya Çayırgan	Keçiören, Ankara	
Kuzeyboru	(Turkey) Mehmet Bedestenlioğlu	(Turkey) Güldeniz Önal	Aksaray	
Nilüfer Belediyespor	(Turkey) Haluk Korkmaz	(Turkey) Hazal Selin Uygur	Nilüfer, Bursa	
Sarıyer Belediyespor	(Turkey) Ali Kayaoğlu	(Turkey) Ceyda Aktaş	Istanbul	
Türk Hava Yolları	(Brazil) ~~Zé Roberto~~ (Turkey) Mehmet Kamil Söz	(Turkey) Büşra Kılıçlı	Istanbul	
VakıfBank	(Italy) Giovanni Guidetti	(Turkey) Zehra Güneş	Istanbul	
Zeren Spor	(Serbia) Stevan Ljubičić	(Turkey) Şeyma Ercan Küçükaslan	Ankara	

== Foreign players ==
Teams are allowed to list no more than 5 foreign players in the roster for each game, and have no more than 3 foreign players on the court at a time.

Team	Player 1	Player 2	Player 3	Player 4	Player 5	Player 6
Aras Kargo	(United States) Annie Mitchem	(Serbia) Bianka Buša	(Belarus) Hanna Klimets	(Ukraine) Yuliya Boyko	—N/a	—N/a
Aydın BBSK	(Poland) Aleksandra Rasińska	(Peru) Ángela Leyva	(Canada) Hilary Johnson	(France) Nina Stojiljković	—N/a	—N/a
Bahçelievler BSK	(United States) Caitie Baird	(Romania) Elizabet Inneh	(Russia) Polina Shemanova	—N/a	—N/a	—N/a
Beşiktaş Ayos	(Canada) Emily Maglio	(Serbia) Jovana Brakočević-Canzian	(Poland) Olivia Różański	—N/a	—N/a	—N/a
Eczacıbaşı Dynavit	(Canada) Alexa Gray	(Italy) Anna Nicoletti	(United States) Dana Rettke	(Serbia) Jovana Stevanović	(United States) Kathryn Plummer	(Serbia) Tijana Bošković
Fenerbahçe Medicana	(Brazil) Ana Cristina de Souza	(Russia) Arina Fedorovtseva	(Serbia) Bojana Drča	(Bulgaria) Elitsa Vasileva-Atanasijević	(Bulgaria) Hristina Vuchkova	(Poland) Magdalena Stysiak
Galatasaray Daikin	(Georgia (country)) Ana Kalandadze	(Netherlands) Britt Bongaerts	(Netherlands) Eline Timmerman	(Serbia) Katarina Lazović	—N/a	—N/a
Keçiören Bld. SigortaShop	(Argentina) Elina Rodríguez	(France) Iman Ndiaye	(United States) Julia Sangiacomo	(United States) Micaya White	(United States) Yaasmeen Bedart-Ghani	—N/a
Kuzeyboru	(Russia) Anna Lazareva	(Russia) Margarita Kurilo	(Bulgaria) Nasya Dimitrova	(Vietnam) Trần Thị Thanh Thúy	—N/a	—N/a
Nilüfer Bld.	(Serbia) Bojana Milenković	(Poland) Julia Szczurowska	(Puerto Rico) Pilar Marie Victoria (Note: Victoriá died in Bursa, Turkey on August 29, 2024, prior to the beginning of the season.)	—N/a	—N/a	—N/a
Sarıyer Bld.	(Croatia) Ema Strunjak	(Russia) Natalia Krotkova	(Serbia) Tara Taubner	—N/a	—N/a	—N/a
Türk Hava Yolları	(Greece) Anthí Vasilantonáki	(Brazil) Diana Duarte	(Brazil) Júlia Bergmann	(Brazil) Roberta Ratzke	—N/a	—N/a
VakıfBank	(United States) Ali Frantti	(Italy) Caterina Bosetti	(United States) Kendall Kipp	(Canada) Kiera Van Ryk	(Russia) Marina Markova	(China) Yuan Xinyue
Zeren Spor	(Serbia) Aleksandra Uzelac	(Serbia) Brankica Mihajlović	(Russia) Elizaveta Kochurina	(Italy) Ofelia Malinov	—N/a	—N/a

== Regular season ==
=== Standings ===
Pos	Team	Pld	W	L	Pts	SW	SL	SR	SPW	SPL	SPR	Qualification or relegation
1	Fenerbahçe Medicana	26	23	3	72	75	14	5.357	2136	1688	1.265	Play-off (1st-4th)
2	VakıfBank	26	22	4	65	70	20	3.500	2115	1760	1.202	Play-off (1st-4th)
3	Eczacıbaşı Dynavit	26	22	4	65	67	23	2.913	2136	1728	1.236	Play-off (1st-4th)
4	Galatasaray Daikin	26	19	7	59	63	30	2.100	2149	1863	1.154	Play-off (1st-4th)
5	Türk Hava Yolları	26	18	8	53	58	35	1.657	2118	1950	1.086	Play-off (5th-8th)
6	Zeren Spor	26	17	9	43	57	47	1.213	2278	2279	1.000	Play-off (5th-8th)
7	Kuzeyboru	26	14	12	42	52	45	1.156	2123	2139	0.993	Play-off (5th-8th)
8	Aydın Büyükşehir Belediyespor	26	9	17	27	39	58	0.672	2089	2200	0.950	Play-off (5th-8th)
9	Bahçelievler Belediyespor	26	9	17	26	31	58	0.534	1814	2054	0.883	
10	Beşiktaş	26	8	18	25	33	59	0.559	1958	2112	0.927	
11	Aras Kargo	26	8	18	24	37	63	0.587	2100	2255	0.931	
12	Nilüfer Belediyespor	26	5	21	20	32	66	0.485	1969	2229	0.883	
13	Keçiören Belediyesi SigortaShop	26	5	21	16	26	67	0.388	1903	2193	0.868	Relegation
14	Sarıyer Belediyespor	26	3	23	9	17	72	0.236	1718	2146	0.801	Relegation

Source: TVF
Rules for classification: 1) Games won 2) Points 3) Set ratio 4) Setpoint ratio

=== Fixture and Results ===
==== First Half (Weeks 1-13) ====
Date	Time		Score		Set 1	Set 2	Set 3	Set 4	Set 5	Total	Report
Week 1
5 Oct 24	13:00	Galatasaray Daikin	3–0	VakıfBank SK	25–21	25–22	25–15			75–58	Report
5 Oct 24	14:00	Keçiören Belediyesi Sigorta Shop	3–2	Sarıyer Belediyespor	16–25	25–20	23–25	25–23	15–13	104–106	Report
5 Oct 24	15:00	Nilüfer Belediyespor	1–3	Bahçelievler Belediyespor	20–25	25–22	19–25	22–25		86–97	Report
5 Oct 24	18:00	Kuzeyboruspor	3–0	Aydın Büyükşehir Belediyespor	25–21	25–22	25–17			75–60	Report
5 Oct 24	18:00	Eczacıbaşı Dynavit	3–0	Aras Kargo	25–12	25–21	25–21			75–54	Report
5 Oct 24	19:00	Türk Hava Yolları	0–3	Fenerbahçe Medicana	14–25	19–25	14–25			47–75	Report
5 Oct 24	19:00	Beşiktaş	3–1	Zeren SK	26–24	25–21	25–27	25–23		101–95	Report

Date	Time		Score		Set 1	Set 2	Set 3	Set 4	Set 5	Total	Report
Week 2
11 Oct 24	14:00	Sarıyer Belediyespor	0–3	Beşiktaş	19–25	23–25	24–26			66–76	Report
11 Oct 24	18:00	Zeren SK	1–3	Eczacıbaşı Dynavit	21–25	25–14	09–25	20–25		75–89	Report
12 Oct 24	14:00	VakıfBank SK	3–2	Kuzeyboruspor	25–13	18–25	19–25	25–16	15–12	102–91	Report
12 Oct 24	15:00	Aydın Büyükşehir Belediyespor	0–3	Türk Hava Yolları	16–25	23–25	20–25			59–75	Report
12 Oct 24	15:00	Fenerbahçe Medicana	3–0	Nilüfer Belediyespor	25–23	32–30	25–18			82–71	Report
12 Oct 24	18:00	Bahçelievler Belediyespor	3–0	Keçiören Belediyesi Sigorta Shop	25–13	25–23	25–16			75–52	Report
12 Oct 24	19:00	Aras Kargo	0–3	Galatasaray Daikin	23–25	23–25	22–25			68–75	Report

Date	Time		Score		Set 1	Set 2	Set 3	Set 4	Set 5	Total	Report
Week 3
19 Oct 24	14:00	VakıfBank SK	3–1	Aras Kargo	25–27	25–16	25–08	25–16		100–67	Report
19 Oct 24	14:00	Keçiören Belediyesi Sigorta Shop	0–3	Fenerbahçe Medicana	23–25	15–25	21–25			59–75	Report
19 Oct 24	15:00	Nilüfer Belediyespor	3–0	Aydın Büyükşehir Belediyespor	25–19	25–20	25–21			75–60	Report
19 Oct 24	18:00	Kuzeyboruspor	1–3	Türk Hava Yolları	18–25	31–29	22–25	18–25		89–104	Report
19 Oct 24	18:00	Eczacıbaşı Dynavit	3–0	Sarıyer Belediyespor	25–15	25–17	25–19			75–51	Report
19 Oct 24	19:00	Galatasaray Daikin	3–0	Zeren SK	25–20	25–22	25–13			75–55	Report
19 Oct 24	19:00	Beşiktaş	1–3	Bahçelievler Belediyespor	25–27	19–25	25–16	22–25		91–93	Report

Date	Time		Score		Set 1	Set 2	Set 3	Set 4	Set 5	Total	Report
Week 4
22 Oct 24	14:00	Fenerbahçe Medicana	3–0	Beşiktaş	25–14	25–20	25–13			75–47	Report
22 Oct 24	17:00	Aras Kargo	1–3	Kuzeyboruspor	25–19	18–25	22–25	25–27		90–96	Report
22 Oct 24	17:00	Sarıyer Belediyespor	0–3	Galatasaray Daikin	15–25	17–25	20–25			52–75	Report
22 Oct 24	17:00	Türk Hava Yolları	3–0	Nilüfer Belediyespor	25–17	25–19	25–20			75–56	Report
22 Oct 24	18:00	Bahçelievler Belediyespor	0–3	Eczacıbaşı Dynavit	10–25	13–25	11–25			34–75	Report
22 Oct 24	18:00	Zeren SK	0–3	VakıfBank SK	16–25	19–25	13–25			48–75	Report
22 Oct 24	19:00	Aydın Büyükşehir Belediyespor	3–1	Keçiören Belediyesi Sigorta Shop	25–22	22–25	25–20	26–24		98–91	Report

Date	Time		Score		Set 1	Set 2	Set 3	Set 4	Set 5	Total	Report
Week 5
26 Oct 24	13:00	Beşiktaş	1–3	Aydın Büyükşehir Belediyespor	25–22	18–25	12–25	18–25		73–97	Report
26 Oct 24	13:00	Galatasaray Daikin	3–0	Bahçelievler Belediyespor	25–20	25–21	25–17			75–58	Report
26 Oct 24	14:00	Keçiören Belediyesi Sigorta Shop	0–3	Türk Hava Yolları	15–25	24–26	16–25			55–76	Report
26 Oct 24	14:00	VakıfBank SK	3–0	Sarıyer Belediyespor	25–14	25–21	25–15			75–50	Report
26 Oct 24	17:30	Aras Kargo	2–3	Zeren SK	25–18	23–25	25–22	21–25	12–15	106–105	Report
26 Oct 24	18:00	Kuzeyboruspor	3–0	Nilüfer Belediyespor	25–19	25–18	25–17			75–54	Report
26 Oct 24	19:00	Eczacıbaşı Dynavit	0–3	Fenerbahçe Medicana	19–25	20–25	24–26			63–76	Report

Date	Time		Score		Set 1	Set 2	Set 3	Set 4	Set 5	Total	Report
Week 6
29 Oct 24	15:00	Türk Hava Yolları	3–0	Beşiktaş	25–16	25–17	25–22			75–55	Report
29 Oct 24	15:00	Aydın Büyükşehir Belediyespor	1–3	Eczacıbaşı Dynavit	27–29	25–22	23–25	19–25		94–101	Report
29 Oct 24	17:00	Sarıyer Belediyespor	1–3	Aras Kargo	19–25	25–23	23–25	23–25		90–98	Report
29 Oct 24	17:30	Fenerbahçe Medicana	3–0	Galatasaray Daikin	25–21	25–16	25–18			75–55	Report
29 Oct 24	18:00	Zeren SK	3–1	Kuzeyboruspor	25–20	23–25	25–23	25–22		98–90	Report
29 Oct 24	18:00	Nilüfer Belediyespor	2–3	Keçiören Belediyesi Sigorta Shop	25–22	25–18	26–28	19–25	6–15	101–108	Report
29 Oct 24	18:00	Bahçelievler Belediyespor	0–3	VakıfBank SK	17–25	18–25	18–25			53–75	Report

Date	Time		Score		Set 1	Set 2	Set 3	Set 4	Set 5	Total	Report
Week 7
2 Nov 24	13:30	VakıfBank SK	3–2	Fenerbahçe Medicana	25–23	14–25	23–25	25–17	15–10	102–100	Report
2 Nov 24	15:00	Zeren SK	3–0	Sarıyer Belediyespor	25–13	25–14	25–19			75–46	Report
2 Nov 24	15:00	Galatasaray Daikin	2–3	Aydın Büyükşehir Belediyespor	25–15	23–25	19–25	25–18	12–15	104–98	Report
2 Nov 24	15:00	Aras Kargo	2–3	Bahçelievler Belediyespor	15–25	25–22	25–19	20–25	9–15	94–106	Report
2 Nov 24	18:00	Kuzeyboruspor	3–0	Keçiören Belediyesi Sigorta Shop	25–21	25–21	25–17			75–59	Report
2 Nov 24	19:30	Eczacıbaşı Dynavit	3–0	Türk Hava Yolları	25–20	25–16	25–21			75–57	Report
3 Nov 24	14:00	Beşiktaş	3–2	Nilüfer Belediyespor	25–17	22–25	21–25	25–18	15–10	108–95	Report

Date	Time		Score		Set 1	Set 2	Set 3	Set 4	Set 5	Total	Report
Week 8
9 Nov 24	14:00	Türk Hava Yolları	3–2	Galatasaray Daikin	29–27	24–26	23–25	25–16	15–11	116–105	Report
9 Nov 24	14:00	Keçiören Belediyesi Sigorta Shop	1–3	Beşiktaş	25–23	25–27	22–25	22–25		94–100	Report
9 Nov 24	15:00	Aydın Büyükşehir Belediyespor	1–3	VakıfBank SK	25–21	21–25	20–25	17–25		83–96	Report
9 Nov 24	15:00	Nilüfer Belediyespor	1–3	Eczacıbaşı Dynavit	17–25	14–25	25–20	20–25		76–95	Report
9 Nov 24	17:00	Sarıyer Belediyespor	0–3	Kuzeyboruspor	20–25	18–25	23–25			61–75	Report
9 Nov 24	18:00	Fenerbahçe Medicana	3–0	Aras Kargo	25–18	25–22	25–22			75–62	Report
9 Nov 24	18:00	Bahçelievler Belediyespor	0–3	Zeren SK	24–26	21–25	19–25			64–76	Report

Date	Time		Score		Set 1	Set 2	Set 3	Set 4	Set 5	Total	Report
Week 9
16 Nov 24	13:00	Zeren SK	3–2	Fenerbahçe Medicana	25–27	25–12	26–24	20–25	15–11	111–99	Report
16 Nov 24	15:00	Aras Kargo	2–3	Aydın Büyükşehir Belediyespor	25–18	25–18	23–25	18–25	11–15	102–101	Report
16 Nov 24	16:30	Eczacıbaşı Dynavit	3–0	Keçiören Belediyesi Sigorta Shop	25–19	25–19	25–18			75–56	Report
16 Nov 24	17:00	Sarıyer Belediyespor	0–3	Bahçelievler Belediyespor	19–25	19–25	24–26			62–76	Report
16 Nov 24	19:00	Kuzeyboruspor	3–1	Beşiktaş	25–19	25–20	20–25	26–24		96–88	Report
17 Nov 24	13:00	Galatasaray Daikin	3–1	Nilüfer Belediyespor	25–17	25–11	18–25	26–24		94–77	Report
17 Nov 24	15:30	VakıfBank SK	3–1	Türk Hava Yolları	23–25	25–22	25–11	25–18		98–76	Report

Date	Time		Score		Set 1	Set 2	Set 3	Set 4	Set 5	Total	Report
Week 10
22 Nov 24	18:00	Beşiktaş	1–3	Eczacıbaşı Dynavit	25–13	24–26	22–25	16–25		87–89	Report
23 Nov 24	13:00	Keçiören Belediyesi Sigorta Shop	1–3	Galatasaray Daikin	15–25	25–21	19–25	22–25		81–96	Report
23 Nov 24	15:00	Aydın Büyükşehir Belediyespor	1–3	Zeren SK	25–27	20–25	25–23	19–25		89–100	Report
23 Nov 24	15:00	Nilüfer Belediyespor	0–3	VakıfBank SK	17–25	15–25	27–29			59–79	Report
23 Nov 24	15:00	Bahçelievler Belediyespor	0–3	Kuzeyboruspor	13–25	13–25	14–25			40–75	Report
23 Nov 24	15:30	Türk Hava Yolları	3–1	Aras Kargo	21–25	25–20	25–15	25–23		96–83	Report
23 Nov 24	19:00	Fenerbahçe Medicana	3–0	Sarıyer Belediyespor	25–15	25–13	25–16			75–44	Report

Date	Time		Score		Set 1	Set 2	Set 3	Set 4	Set 5	Total	Report
Week 11
29 Nov 24	14:00	Aras Kargo	3–0	Nilüfer Belediyespor	25–22	25–16	25–19			75–57	Report
30 Nov 24	13:00	Kuzeyboruspor	1–3	Eczacıbaşı Dynavit	25–27	25–18	20–25	19–25		89–95	Report
30 Nov 24	15:00	Zeren SK	1–3	Türk Hava Yolları	19–25	25–16	19–25	19–25		82–91	Report
30 Nov 24	18:00	Bahçelievler Belediyespor	1–3	Fenerbahçe Medicana	25–21	17–25	20–25	17–25		79–96	Report
30 Nov 24	18:30	Sarıyer Belediyespor	0–3	Aydın Büyükşehir Belediyespor	13–25	23–25	8–25			44–75	Report
1 Dec 24	14:00	VakıfBank SK	3–0	Keçiören Belediyesi Sigorta Shop	25–16	26–24	25–21			76–61	Report
1 Dec 24	17:00	Galatasaray Daikin	3–0	Beşiktaş	25–13	25–23	25–22			75–58	Report

Date	Time		Score		Set 1	Set 2	Set 3	Set 4	Set 5	Total	Report
Week 12
6 Dec 24	18:00	Eczacıbaşı Dynavit	1–3	Galatasaray Daikin	22–25	25–11	14–25	19–25		80–86	Report
7 Dec 24	13:00	Beşiktaş	0–3	VakıfBank SK	12–25	13–25	24–26			49–76	Report
7 Dec 24	13:00	Fenerbahçe Medicana	3–0	Kuzeyboruspor	25–17	25–10	25–15			75–42	Report
7 Dec 24	16:00	Aydın Büyükşehir Belediyespor	0–3	Bahçelievler Belediyespor	23–25	23–25	21–25			67–75	Report
7 Dec 24	18:00	Türk Hava Yolları	3–0	Sarıyer Belediyespor	25–19	25–17	25–21			75–57	Report
7 Dec 24	18:30	Keçiören Belediyesi Sigorta Shop	3–0	Aras Kargo	25–20	25–18	25–14			75–52	Report
8 Dec 24	20:00	Nilüfer Belediyespor	0–3	Zeren SK	24–26	22–25	25–27			71–78	Report

Date	Time		Score		Set 1	Set 2	Set 3	Set 4	Set 5	Total	Report
Week 13
13 Dec 24	17:00	Aras Kargo	1–3	Beşiktaş	23–25	23–25	25–22	21–25		92–97	Report
14 Dec 24	15:00	Zeren SK	3–0	Keçiören Belediyesi Sigorta Shop	30–28	25–19	25–20			80–67	Report
14 Dec 24	17:00	Sarıyer Belediyespor	3–2	Nilüfer Belediyespor	20–25	25–21	23–25	25–12	15–8	108–91	Report
14 Dec 24	17:30	Fenerbahçe Medicana	3–1	Aydın Büyükşehir Belediyespor	21–25	25–16	25–18	25–15		96–74	Report
14 Dec 24	18:00	Bahçelievler Belediyespor	0–3	Türk Hava Yolları	16–25	23–25	18–25			57–75	Report
14 Dec 24	19:00	VakıfBank SK	1–3	Eczacıbaşı Dynavit	19–25	16–25	25–23	16–25		76–98	Report
15 Dec 24	17:00	Kuzeyboruspor	3–2	Galatasaray Daikin	21–25	25–19	25–21	18–25	25–13	114–103	Report

==== Second Half (Weeks 14-26) ====
Date	Time		Score		Set 1	Set 2	Set 3	Set 4	Set 5	Total	Report
Week 14
3 Jan 25	17:00	Fenerbahçe Medicana	3–0	Türk Hava Yolları	25–21	25–20	25–18			75–59	Report
4 Jan 25	14:00	VakıfBank SK	3–0	Galatasaray Daikin	25–20	25–16	25–14			75–50	Report
5 Jan 25	13:00	Zeren SK	3–2	Beşiktaş	17–25	25–16	24–26	25–23	15–13	106–103	Report
5 Jan 25	15:00	Aydın Büyükşehir Belediyespor	2–3	Kuzeyboruspor	18–25	25–22	25–16	21–25	14–16	103–104	Report
5 Jan 25	15:30	Aras Kargo	0–3	Eczacıbaşı Dynavit	23–25	23–25	12–25			58–75	Report
5 Jan 25	17:00	Sarıyer Belediyespor	0–3	Keçiören Belediyesi Sigorta Shop	18–25	20–25	23–25			61–75	Report
5 Jan 25	18:00	Bahçelievler Belediyespor	3–2	Nilüfer Belediyespor	27–25	25–19	12–25	22–25	15–13	101–107	Report

Date	Time		Score		Set 1	Set 2	Set 3	Set 4	Set 5	Total	Report
Week 15
12 Jan 25	13:00	Kuzeyboruspor	0–3	VakıfBank SK	22–25	18–25	21–25			61–75	Report
12 Jan 25	14:00	Keçiören Belediyesi Sigorta Shop	3–0	Bahçelievler Belediyespor	25–23	25–23	25–14			75–60	Report
12 Jan 25	14:00	Galatasaray Daikin	3–1	Aras Kargo	25–18	25–13	26–28	25–19		101–78	Report
12 Jan 25	15:00	Nilüfer Belediyespor	0–3	Fenerbahçe Medicana	10–25	15–25	17–25			42–75	Report
12 Jan 25	17:00	Beşiktaş	3–0	Sarıyer Belediyespor	25–20	25–18	25–19			75–57	Report
12 Jan 25	17:00	Türk Hava Yolları	3–1	Aydın Büyükşehir Belediyespor	25–16	25–13	20–25	25–22		95–76	Report
12 Jan 25	19:00	Eczacıbaşı Dynavit	3–1	Zeren SK	25–18	23–25	25–10	25–19		98–72	Report

Date	Time		Score		Set 1	Set 2	Set 3	Set 4	Set 5	Total	Report
Week 16
14 Jan 25	18:00	Aras Kargo	0–3	VakıfBank SK	10–25	22–25	21–25			53–75	Report
15 Jan 25	13:00	Fenerbahçe Medicana	3–0	Keçiören Belediyesi Sigorta Shop	25–16	25–21	25–10			75–47	Report
15 Jan 25	14:00	Zeren SK	1–3	Galatasaray Daikin	31–29	21–25	19–25	22–25		93–104	Report
15 Jan 25	17:00	Bahçelievler Belediyespor	3–1	Beşiktaş	16–25	25–23	25–17	25–22		91–87	Report
15 Jan 25	17:00	Sarıyer Belediyespor	0–3	Eczacıbaşı Dynavit	13–25	12–25	18–25			43–75	Report
15 Jan 25	19:00	Aydın Büyükşehir Belediyespor	1–3	Nilüfer Belediyespor	15–25	23–25	25–22	23–25		86–97	Report
16 Jan 25	13:30	Türk Hava Yolları	3–0	Kuzeyboruspor	25–8	26–24	25–16			76–48	Report

Date	Time		Score		Set 1	Set 2	Set 3	Set 4	Set 5	Total	Report
Week 17
18 Jan 25	13:00	VakıfBank SK	2–3	Zeren SK	25–21	23–25	25–18	18–25	13–15	104–104	Report
19 Jan 25	13:00	Keçiören Belediyesi Sigorta Shop	0–3	Aydın Büyükşehir Belediyespor	16–25	22–25	25–27			63–77	Report
19 Jan 25	13:00	Beşiktaş	0–3	Fenerbahçe Medicana	18–25	19–25	26–28			63–78	Report
19 Jan 25	14:00	Eczacıbaşı Dynavit	3–0	Bahçelievler Belediyespor	25–17	25–17	25–15			75–49	Report
19 Jan 25	14:00	Kuzeyboruspor	2–3	Aras Kargo	22–25	20–25	25–14	25–22	8–15	100–101	Report
19 Jan 25	15:00	Galatasaray Daikin	3–0	Sarıyer Belediyespor	25–19	25–12	25–12			75–43	Report
19 Jan 25	15:00	Nilüfer Belediyespor	1–3	Türk Hava Yolları	25–20	21–25	15–25	12–25		73–95	Report

Date	Time		Score		Set 1	Set 2	Set 3	Set 4	Set 5	Total	Report
Week 18
25 Jan 25	15:00	Nilüfer Belediyespor	1–3	Kuzeyboruspor	21–25	16–25	28–26	21–25		86–101	Report
26 Jan 25	13:00	Türk Hava Yolları	3–2	Keçiören Belediyesi Sigorta Shop	23–25	25–19	25–13	23–25	15–7	111–89	Report
26 Jan 25	13:00	Bahçelievler Belediyespor	2–3	Galatasaray Daikin	23–25	9–25	27–25	25–19	6–15	90–109	Report
26 Jan 25	14:00	Sarıyer Belediyespor	0–3	VakıfBank SK	23–25	19–25	17–25			59–75	Report
26 Jan 25	15:00	Zeren SK	3–0	Aras Kargo	25–14	25–23	25–20			75–57	Report
26 Jan 25	15:00	Aydın Büyükşehir Belediyespor	3–0	Beşiktaş	25–20	33–31	25–23			83–74	Report
26 Jan 25	17:00	Fenerbahçe Medicana	2–3	Eczacıbaşı Dynavit	25–16	21–25	25–23	19–25	11–15	101–104	Report

Date	Time		Score		Set 1	Set 2	Set 3	Set 4	Set 5	Total	Report
Week 19
1 Feb 25	17:00	Beşiktaş	3–0	Türk Hava Yolları	25–17	25–15	25–14			75–46	Report
2 Feb 25	14:00	VakıfBank SK	3–0	Bahçelievler Belediyespor	25–15	25–22	25–17			75–54	Report
2 Feb 25	15:00	Keçiören Belediyesi Sigorta Shop	2–3	Nilüfer Belediyespor	25–23	25–20	21–25	21–25	13–15	105–108	Report
2 Feb 25	15:00	Aras Kargo	3–1	Sarıyer Belediyespor	23–25	25–20	25–21	25–17		98–83	Report
2 Feb 25	16:00	Galatasaray Daikin	0–3	Fenerbahçe Medicana	18–25	16–25	17–25			51–75	Report
2 Feb 25	18:00	Eczacıbaşı Dynavit	3–0	Aydın Büyükşehir Belediyespor	25–14	25–15	25–14			75–43	Report
2 Feb 25	19:00	Kuzeyboruspor	3–1	Zeren SK	16–25	25–17	25–12	25–18		91–72	Report

Date	Time		Score		Set 1	Set 2	Set 3	Set 4	Set 5	Total	Report
Week 20
9 Feb 25	13:00	Türk Hava Yolları	3–0	Eczacıbaşı Dynavit	25–21	26–24	25–20			76–65	Report
9 Feb 25	15:00	Aydın Büyükşehir Belediyespor	1–3	Galatasaray Daikin	25–23	7–25	20–25	20–25		72–98	Report
9 Feb 25	15:00	Nilüfer Belediyespor	3–0	Beşiktaş	25–22	25–22	25–16			75–60	Report
9 Feb 25	15:00	Sarıyer Belediyespor	1–3	Zeren SK	22–25	26–24	16–25	22–25		86–99	Report
9 Feb 25	15:00	Keçiören Belediyesi Sigorta Shop	0–3	Kuzeyboruspor	30–32	22–25	18–25			70–82	Report
9 Feb 25	16:30	Fenerbahçe Medicana	3–1	VakıfBank SK	19–25	25–13	25–22	25–16		94–76	Report
9 Feb 25	18:00	Bahçelievler Belediyespor	0–3	Aras Kargo	15–25	14–25	21–25			50–75	Report

Date	Time		Score		Set 1	Set 2	Set 3	Set 4	Set 5	Total	Report
Week 21
16 Feb 25	13:00	Zeren SK	3–1	Bahçelievler Belediyespor	25–19	22–25	25–23	25–21		97–88	Report
16 Feb 25	14:00	Kuzeyboruspor	3–1	Sarıyer Belediyespor	20–25	25–18	25–17	25–19		95–79	Report
16 Feb 25	14:00	VakıfBank SK	3–0	Aydın Büyükşehir Belediyespor	25–23	26–24	25–14			76–61	Report
16 Feb 25	17:00	Beşiktaş	3–0	Keçiören Belediyesi Sigorta Shop	25–11	25–13	25–23			75–47	Report
16 Feb 25	18:00	Eczacıbaşı Dynavit	3–0	Nilüfer Belediyespor	25–16	25–15	25–18			75–49	Report
16 Feb 25	20:00	Aras Kargo	0–3	Fenerbahçe Medicana	21–25	23–25	22–25			66–75	Report
26 Feb 25	19:00	Galatasaray Daikin	3–0	Türk Hava Yolları	25–23	25–14	25–18			75–55	Report

Date	Time		Score		Set 1	Set 2	Set 3	Set 4	Set 5	Total	Report
Week 22
22 Feb 25	14:00	Keçiören Belediyesi Sigorta Shop	1–3	Eczacıbaşı Dynavit	25–22	10–25	14–25	16–25		65–97	Report
22 Feb 25	17:00	Beşiktaş	0–3	Kuzeyboruspor	24–26	22–25	21–25			67–76	Report
23 Feb 25	15:00	Aydın Büyükşehir Belediyespor	3–1	Aras Kargo	25–16	25–22	23–25	25–17		98–80	Report
23 Feb 25	15:00	Nilüfer Belediyespor	0–3	Galatasaray Daikin	13–25	21–25	18–25			52–75	Report
23 Feb 25	18:00	Türk Hava Yolları	1–3	VakıfBank SK	26–28	23–25	25–18	18–25		92–96	Report
23 Feb 25	18:00	Bahçelievler Belediyespor	0–3	Sarıyer Belediyespor	25–27	22–25	24–26			71–78	Report
24 Feb 25	15:00	Fenerbahçe Medicana	3–0	Zeren SK	25–21	25–16	25–20			75–57	Report

Date	Time		Score		Set 1	Set 2	Set 3	Set 4	Set 5	Total	Report
Week 23
28 Feb 25	14:00	Sarıyer Belediyespor	1–3	Fenerbahçe Medicana	25–22	16–25	17–25	11–25		69–97	Report
28 Feb 25	14:00	VakıfBank SK	3–0	Nilüfer Belediyespor	25–17	25–14	25–17			75–48	Report
1 Mar 25	14:00	Eczacıbaşı Dynavit	3–0	Beşiktaş	25–23	25–13	25–13			75–49	Report
2 Mar 25	15:00	Galatasaray Daikin	3–0	Keçiören Belediyesi Sigorta Shop	25–13	26–24	25–19			76–56	Report
2 Mar 25	16:00	Kuzeyboruspor	0–3	Bahçelievler Belediyespor	20–25	18–25	14–25			52–75	Report
2 Mar 25	17:30	Aras Kargo	1–3	Türk Hava Yolları	19–25	26–24	23–25	18–25		86–99	Report
2 Mar 25	15:00	Zeren SK	3–2	Aydın Büyükşehir Belediyespor	25–22	17–25	23–25	25–22	15–13	105–107	Report

Date	Time		Score		Set 1	Set 2	Set 3	Set 4	Set 5	Total	Report
Week 24
8 Mar 25	18:00	Beşiktaş	0–3	Galatasaray Daikin	18–25	20–25	15–25			53–75	Report
9 Mar 25	13:00	Türk Hava Yolları	2–3	Zeren SK	19–25	25–21	20–25	25–23	13–15	102–109	Report
9 Mar 25	14:00	Keçiören Belediyesi Sigorta Shop	0–3	VakıfBank SK	16–25	23–25	18–25			57–75	Report
9 Mar 25	15:00	Aydın Büyükşehir Belediyespor	1–3	Sarıyer Belediyespor	22–25	23–25	25–18	22–25		92–93	Report
9 Mar 25	15:00	Nilüfer Belediyespor	2–3	Aras Kargo	24–26	17–25	25–19	25–12	5–12	96–94	Report
9 Mar 25	16:00	Fenerbahçe Medicana	3–0	Bahçelievler Belediyespor	25–18	25–20	25–17			75–55	Report
9 Mar 25	16:30	Eczacıbaşı Dynavit	3–1	Kuzeyboruspor	25–13	25–27	25–15	25–19		100–74	Report

Date	Time		Score		Set 1	Set 2	Set 3	Set 4	Set 5	Total	Report
Week 25
16 Mar 25	13:30	Kuzeyboruspor	1–3	Fenerbahçe Medicana	22–25	16–25	25–17	19–25		82–92	Report
16 Mar 25	14:00	VakıfBank SK	3–0	Beşiktaş	25–16	25–18	25–22			75–56	Report
16 Mar 25	15:00	Zeren SK	3–2	Nilüfer Belediyespor	25–12	22–25	21–25	25–22	15–8	108–92	Report
16 Mar 25	15:00	Aras Kargo	3–1	Keçiören Belediyesi Sigorta Shop	25–16	25–21	23–25	25–21		98–83	Report
16 Mar 25	17:00	Sarıyer Belediyespor	1–3	Türk Hava Yolları	17–25	26–24	21–25	18–25		82–99	Report
16 Mar 25	18:00	Bahçelievler Belediyespor	0–3	Aydın Büyükşehir Belediyespor	17–25	21–25	20–25			58–75	Report
16 Mar 25	19:30	Galatasaray Daikin	0–3	Eczacıbaşı Dynavit	19–25	20–25	24–26			63–76	Report

Date	Time		Score		Set 1	Set 2	Set 3	Set 4	Set 5	Total	Report
Week 26
19 Mar 25	13:00	Türk Hava Yolları	3–0	Bahçelievler Belediyespor	25–19	25–15	25–21			75–55	Report
19 Mar 25	14:00	Keçiören Belediyesi Sigorta Shop	2–3	Zeren SK	25–21	21–25	26–24	26–28	11–15	109–113	Report
19 Mar 25	17:00	Galatasaray Daikin	3–1	Kuzeyboruspor	25–17	25–19	29–31	25–18		104–85	Report
19 Mar 25	18:00	Beşiktaş	2–3	Aras Kargo	22–25	25–22	25–23	15–25	10–15	97–110	Report
19 Mar 25	18:00	Aydın Büyükşehir Belediyespor	0–3	Fenerbahçe Medicana	18–25	20–25	23–25			61–75	Report
19 Mar 25	18:00	Nilüfer Belediyespor	3–0	Sarıyer Belediyespor	25–18	25–16	25–14			75–48	Report
20 Mar 25	19:30	Eczacıbaşı Dynavit	0–3	VakıfBank SK	20–25	20–25	21–25			61–75	Report

== Play-Offs ==
=== Championship bracket ===
Semifinals
9 Apr – 15 Apr 2025
1 Fenerbahçe Medicana	2	3	3
4 Galatasaray Daikin	3	1	2
9 Apr – 12 Apr 2025
2 VakıfBank	3	3
3 Eczacıbaşı	1	1

Final
17 Apr – 27 Apr 2025
1 Fenerbahçe Medicana	1	1	1
2 VakıfBank	3	3	3
3rd place match
17 Apr – 20 Apr 2025
4 Galatasaray Daikin	0	2
3 Eczacıbaşı	3	3

=== Classification bracket ===
Classification 5th–8th
23 Mar – 26 Mar 2025
5 THY	3	3
8 Aydın Büyükşehir Belediyespor	1	1
23 Mar – 26 Mar 2025
6 Zeren Spor	3	3
7 Kuzeyboru	2	2

Fifth place
10 Apr – 15 Apr 2025
5 THY	3	1	1
6 Zeren Spor	2	3	3
Seventh place
5 Apr – 8 Apr 2025
7 Kuzeyboru	3	3
8 Aydın Büyükşehir Belediyespor	0	0

== Final standings ==
2025-26 CEV Women's Champions League
2025-26 Women's CEV Cup
2025-26 CEV Women's Challenge Cup
2025 BVA Cup
Relegation

Rank	Team
1	VakıfBank
2	Fenerbahçe Medicana
3	Eczacıbaşı Dynavit
4	Galatasaray Daikin
5	Zeren Spor
6	Türk Hava Yolları
7	Kuzeyboru
8	Aydın Büyükşehir Belediyespor
9	Bahçelievler Belediyespor
10	Beşiktaş
11	Aras Kargo
12	Nilüfer Belediyespor
13	Keçiören Belediyesi SigortaShop
14	Sarıyer Belediyespor
