= 2025–26 Turkish Women's Volleyball League =

- League: Turkish Women's Volleyball League
- Sport: Volleyball
- Duration: 11 October 2025 – 19 April 2026
- Teams: 14

Regular season
- Season champions: (Turkey) VakıfBank

Play-offs

Final
- Champions: (Turkey) VakıfBank
- Runners-up: (Turkey) Fenerbahçe Medicana
- Finals MVP: (Russia) Marina Markova

Turkish Women's Volleyball League seasons
- ← 2024–25 2026–27 →

The 2025–26 Turkish Women's Volleyball League, branded as the 2025–26 Vodafone Sultans League (Turkish: 2025–26 Vodafone Sultanlar Ligi), was the 43rd edition of the top-level women's volleyball league in Turkey. The competition was organised by the Turkish Volleyball Federation.

VakıfBank won the championship after defeating Fenerbahçe Medicana in the play-off final series, 3–2. Marina Markova of VakıfBank was named the most valuable player of the final.

== Teams ==
Fourteen teams competed in the league stage.

#	Team	City
1	Aras Kargo	İzmir
2	Aydın BB	Aydın
3	Bahçelievler Bld.	Istanbul
4	Beşiktaş	Istanbul
5	Eczacıbaşı Dynavit	Istanbul
6	Fenerbahçe Medicana	Istanbul
7	Galatasaray Daikin	Istanbul
8	Göztepe	İzmir
9	İlbank	Ankara
10	Kuzeyboru	Aksaray
11	Nilüfer Bld.	Bursa
12	Türk Hava Yolları	Istanbul
13	VakıfBank	Istanbul
14	Zeren Spor	Ankara

== Competition format ==
The season consisted of a double round-robin regular season followed by classification play-offs. After the league stage, the top four teams entered the championship play-offs, while other teams played classification rounds.

== Regular season ==
The regular season was played by 14 teams over 26 matches. VakıfBank finished first with 25 wins and 73 points.

Pos	Team	Pld	W	L	Pts	SW	SL	SR	SPW	SPL	SPR	Qualification or relegation
1	VakıfBank	26	25	1	73	76	13	5.846	2155	1767	1.220	Play-off (1st-4th)
2	Fenerbahçe	26	22	4	67	73	23	3.174	2296	1842	1.246	Play-off (1st-4th)
3	Zeren Spor	26	21	5	58	66	28	2.357	2186	1938	1.128	Play-off (1st-4th)
4	Eczacıbaşı Dynavit	26	20	6	58	68	29	2.345	2276	1940	1.173	Play-off (1st-4th)
5	Galatasaray	26	17	9	52	57	37	1.541	2131	1928	1.105	Play-off (5th-8th)
6	Nilüfer Belediyespor	26	14	12	41	47	49	0.959	2096	2154	0.973	Play-off (5th-8th)
7	Aras Kargo	26	13	13	37	46	47	0.979	2043	1978	1.033	Play-off (5th-8th)
8	Türk Hava Yolları	26	11	15	35	48	55	0.873	2178	2232	0.976	Play-off (5th-8th)
9	Kuzeyboruspor	26	9	17	29	40	57	0.702	2080	2184	0.952	
10	Beşiktaş	26	9	17	29	39	59	0.661	2016	2148	0.939	
11	Göztepe	26	9	17	28	40	56	0.714	2041	2157	0.946	
12	İlbank	26	6	20	19	27	67	0.403	1870	2224	0.841	
13	Aydın Büyükşehir Belediyespor	26	5	21	18	31	70	0.443	2021	2317	0.872	Relegation
14	Bahçelievler Bel.	26	1	25	2	9	77	0.117	1527	2107	0.725	Relegation

Updated to match(es) played on unknown. Source: TVF

=== Fixture and Results ===
==== First Half (Weeks 1–13) ====
Date	Time		Score		Set 1	Set 2	Set 3	Set 4	Set 5	Total	Report
Week 1
11 Oct 25	19.00	Zeren	1–3	VakıfBank	23–25	28–26	19–25	13–25		83–101	Report
12 Oct 25	12.00	Beşiktaş	3–1	İlbank	21–25	25–12	25–20	25–19		96–76	Report
12 Oct 25	14.00	Aras Kargo	1–3	Fenerbahçe Medicana	15–25	25–15	18–25	13–25		71–90	Report
12 Oct 25	15.00	Eczacıbaşı Dynavit	3–0	Kuzeyboru	25–15	25–14	25–18			75–47	Report
12 Oct 25	18.30	Galatasaray Daikin	3–0	Aydın Bş. Bld.	25–16	26–24	25–23			76–63	Report
12 Oct 25	19.00	Göztepe	1–3	Nilüfer Belediyespor	16–25	25–15	25–27	21–25		87–92	Report
12 Oct 25	20.30	Türk Hava Yolları	3–1	Bahçelievler Bel.	25–19	17–25	25–12	25–19		92–75	Report

Date	Time		Score		Set 1	Set 2	Set 3	Set 4	Set 5	Total	Report
Week 2
18 Oct 25	15.00	İlbank	0–3	Eczacıbaşı Dynavit	15–25	20–25	17–25			52–75	Report
18 Oct 25	17.00	VakıfBank	3–0	Beşiktaş	25–19	25–16	25–19			75–54	Report
18 Oct 25	18.00	Kuzeyboru	0–3	Galatasaray Daikin	16–25	14–25	28–30			58–80	Report
19 Oct 25	13.00	Fenerbahçe Medicana	3–0	Türk Hava Yolları	25–15	25–16	25–12			75–43	Report
19 Oct 25	15.00	Aydın Bş. Bld.	0–3	Göztepe	21–25	23–25	19–25			63–75	Report
19 Oct 25	16.00	Bahçelievler Bel.	0–3	Zeren	15–25	15–25	16–25			46–75	Report
19 Oct 25	18.00	Nilüfer Belediyespor	3–2	Aras Kargo	13–25	25–21	21–25	25–17	15–13	99–101	Report

Date	Time		Score		Set 1	Set 2	Set 3	Set 4	Set 5	Total	Report
Week 3
21 Oct 25	18.30	Galatasaray Daikin	3–0	İlbank	25–12	25–16	25–16			75–44	Report
22 Oct 25	15.00	Aydın Bş. Bld.	3–1	Kuzeyboru	25–23	22–25	25–22	25–18		97–88	Report
22 Oct 25	17.00	Göztepe	0–3	Aras Kargo	19–25	15–25	15–25			49–75	Report
22 Oct 25	17.30	Türk Hava Yolları	3–2	Nilüfer Belediyespor	25–20	25–27	30–32	25–15	16–14	121–108	Report
22 Oct 25	18.00	Beşiktaş	3–0	Bahçelievler Bel.	25–21	25–18	25–10			75–49	Report
22 Oct 25	19.30	Zeren	0–3	Fenerbahçe Medicana	14–25	21–25	20–25			55–75	Report
22 Oct 25	19.30	Eczacıbaşı Dynavit	1–3	VakıfBank	25–23	23–25	21–25	24–26		93–99	Report

Date	Time		Score		Set 1	Set 2	Set 3	Set 4	Set 5	Total	Report
Week 4
26 Oct 25	14.00	Kuzeyboru	3–2	Göztepe	25–20	25–21	16–25	20–25	15–12	101–103	Report
26 Oct 25	14.00	İlbank	3–1	Aydın Bş. Bld.	25–20	20–25	30–28	25–18		100–91	Report
26 Oct 25	16.00	Bahçelievler Bel.	0–3	Eczacıbaşı Dynavit	22–25	22–25	16–25			60–75	Report
26 Oct 25	17.00	Aras Kargo	3–1	Türk Hava Yolları	25–19	22–25	25–22	25–15		97–81	Report
26 Oct 25	18.00	Nilüfer Belediyespor	0–3	Zeren	24–26	23–25	12–25			59–76	Report
26 Oct 25	18.00	VakıfBank	3–0	Galatasaray Daikin	26–24	25–19	25–17			76–60	Report
26 Oct 25	20.00	Fenerbahçe Medicana	3–0	Beşiktaş	25–13	25–16	25–17			75–46	Report

Date	Time		Score		Set 1	Set 2	Set 3	Set 4	Set 5	Total	Report
Week 5
16 Nov 25	19.00	Göztepe	0–3	Türk Hava Yolları	22–25	19–25	19–25			60–75	Report
16 Nov 25	17.00	Zeren	3–0	Aras Kargo	25–20	25–22	25–19			75–61	Report
16 Nov 25	15.00	Aydın Bş. Bld.	0–3	VakıfBank	20–25	20–25	19–25			59–75	Report
16 Nov 25	17.00	Beşiktaş	0–3	Nilüfer Belediyespor	22–25	23–25	14–25			59–75	Report
16 Nov 25	17.00	Galatasaray Daikin	3–0	Bahçelievler Bel.	25–22	22–15	25–19			72–56	Report
16 Nov 25	19.30	Eczacıbaşı Dynavit	1–3	Fenerbahçe Medicana	13–25	25–21	15–25	26–28		79–99	Report
17 Nov 25	18.30	Kuzeyboru	3–1	İlbank	25–19	14–25	25–18	25–22		89–84	Report

Date	Time		Score		Set 1	Set 2	Set 3	Set 4	Set 5	Total	Report
Week 6
20 Nov 25	15.00	İlbank	3 –1	Göztepe	29–27	26–24	21–25	25–22		101–98	Report
20 Nov 25	15.00	Türk Hava Yolları	0–3	Zeren	15–25	19–25	24–26			58–76	Report
20 Nov 25	14.00	VakıfBank	3–0	Kuzeyboru	25–19	25–16	25–14			75–49	Report
20 Nov 25	15.00	Aras Kargo	3–0	Beşiktaş	25–19	25–15	25–20			75–54	Report
20 Nov 25	16.00	Bahçelievler Bel.	0–3	Aydın Bş. Bld.	22–25	17–25	13–25			52–75	Report
20 Nov 25	17.00	Nilüfer Belediyespor	3–1	Eczacıbaşı Dynavit	28–30	25–18	25–22	25–22		103–92	Report
20 Nov 25	19.30	Fenerbahçe Medicana	3–2	Galatasaray Daikin	27–25	22–25	25–23	25–27	15–11	114–111	Report

Date	Time		Score		Set 1	Set 2	Set 3	Set 4	Set 5	Total	Report
Week 7
23 Nov 25	14.00	Kuzeyboru	3–1	Bahçelievler Bel.	25–18	22–25	25–15	25–23		97–81	Report
23 Nov 25	14.30	Göztepe	0–3	Zeren	21–25	19–25	15–25			55–75	Report
23 Nov 25	15.00	Aydın Bş. Bld.	1–3	Fenerbahçe Medicana	26–24	24–26	17–25	14–25		81–100	Report
23 Nov 25	17.00	Galatasaray Daikin	3–0	Nilüfer Belediyespor	25–16	25–23	25–16			75–55	Report
23 Nov 25	18.00	Beşiktaş	3–1	Türk Hava Yolları	9–25	31–29	25–17	25–9		90–80	Report
23 Nov 25	18.00	Eczacıbaşı Dynavit	3–0	Aras Kargo	25–18	25–18	25–19			75–55	Report
23 Nov 25	18.00	İlbank	0–3	VakıfBank	22–25	18–25	13–25			53–75	Report

Date	Time		Score		Set 1	Set 2	Set 3	Set 4	Set 5	Total	Report
Week 8
29 Nov 25	15.00	VakıfBank	3–0	Göztepe	25–22	25–22	25–14			75–58	Report
29 Nov 25	19.00	Fenerbahçe Medicana	3–0	Kuzeyboru	25–22	25–21	25–14			75–57	Report
30 Nov 25	14.00	Zeren	3–0	Beşiktaş	25–17	25–12	25–16			75–45	Report
30 Nov 25	16.00	Türk Hava Yolları	0–3	Eczacıbaşı Dynavit	16–25	16–25	17–25			49–75	Report
30 Nov 25	16.00	Bahçelievler Bel.	1–3	İlbank	26–24	23–25	19–25	21–25		89–99	Report
30 Nov 25	16.00	Aras Kargo	1–3	Galatasaray Daikin	25–23	21–25	19–25	13–25		78–98	Report
30 Nov 25	18.00	Nilüfer Belediyespor	3–2	Aydın Bş. Bld.	25–21	17–25	19–25	25–22	15–8	101–101	Report

Date	Time		Score		Set 1	Set 2	Set 3	Set 4	Set 5	Total	Report
Week 9
5 Dec 25	14.00	VakıfBank	3–0	Bahçelievler Bel.	25–19	25–11	25–15			75–45	Report
6 Dec 25	15.00	Aydın Bş. Bld.	0–3	Aras Kargo	18–25	23–25	19–25			60–75	Report
7 Dec 25	14.00	Kuzeyboru	1–3	Nilüfer Belediyespor	21–25	25–27	25–18	18–25		89–95	Report
7 Dec 25	15.00	Göztepe	3–2	Beşiktaş	20–25	25–23	25–23	18–25	15–10	103–106	Report
7 Dec 25	15.00	İlbank	0–3	Fenerbahçe Medicana	19–25	16–25	18–25			53–75	Report
7 Dec 25	17.00	Galatasaray Daikin	3–1	Türk Hava Yolları	23–25	25–22	25–13	25–15		98–75	Report
7 Dec 25	18.00	Eczacıbaşı Dynavit	3–0	Zeren	25–22	25–19	25–19			75–60	Report

Date	Time		Score		Set 1	Set 2	Set 3	Set 4	Set 5	Total	Report
Week 10
10 Dec 25	14.00	Bahçelievler Bel.	0–3	Göztepe	14–25	12–25	16–25			42–75	Report
10 Dec 25	18.00	Nilüfer Belediyespor	3–1	İlbank	25–9	19–25	25–15	25–14		94–63	Report
10 Dec 25	18.30	Beşiktaş	2–3	Eczacıbaşı Dynavit	25–23	19–25	25–19	17–25	6–15	92–107	Report
10 Dec 25	19.00	Aras Kargo	3–0	Kuzeyboru	25–22	27–25	25–17			77–64	Report
11 Dec 25	15.00	Türk Hava Yolları	2–3	Aydın Bş. Bld.	25–16	27–29	17–25	25–21	13–15	107–106	Report
11 Dec 25	18.00	Zeren	3–2	Galatasaray Daikin	19–25	25–18	17–25	25–11	15–10	101–89	Report
11 Dec 25	19.00	Fenerbahçe Medicana	2–3	VakıfBank	25–14	21–25	25–17	23–25	13–15	107–96	Report

Date	Time		Score		Set 1	Set 2	Set 3	Set 4	Set 5	Total	Report
Week 11
13 Dec 25	15.30	Göztepe	0–3	Eczacıbaşı Dynavit	22–25	18–25	20–25			60–75	Report
14 Dec 25	14.00	Kuzeyboru	1–3	Türk Hava Yolları	20–25	25–13	22–25	15–25		82–88	Report
14 Dec 25	14.00	VakıfBank	3–0	Nilüfer Belediyespor	25–19	25–21	25–21			75–61	Report
14 Dec 25	15.00	Aydın Bş. Bld.	2–3	Zeren	25–23	25–17	19–25	17–25	12–15	98–105	Report
14 Dec 25	16.00	Bahçelievler Bel.	0–3	Fenerbahçe Medicana	10–25	15–25	16–25			41–75	Report
14 Dec 25	16.30	İlbank	1–3	Aras Kargo	25–16	19–25	20–25	20–25		84–91	Report
14 Dec 25	19.00	Galatasaray Daikin	3–0	Beşiktaş	25–20	25–20	25–11			75–51	Report

Date	Time		Score		Set 1	Set 2	Set 3	Set 4	Set 5	Total	Report
Week 12
17 Dec 25	15.00	Zeren	3–1	Kuzeyboru	25–19	25–17	22–25	34–32		106–93	Report
17 Dec 25	15.00	Türk Hava Yolları	3–0	İlbank	25–20	25–15	25–18			75–53	Report
17 Dec 25	15.00	Nilüfer Belediyespor	3–0	Bahçelievler Bel.	25–18	25–19	25–18			75–55	Report
17 Dec 25	17.00	Beşiktaş	2–3	Aydın Bş. Bld.	18–25	25–15	25–15	21–25	14–16	103–96	Report
17 Dec 25	18.00	Eczacıbaşı Dynavit	3–0	Galatasaray Daikin	25–23	25–17	25–21			75–61	Report
17 Dec 25	19.00	Aras Kargo	0–3	VakıfBank	23–25	24–26	23–25			70–76	Report
17 Dec 25	19.00	Fenerbahçe Medicana	3–1	Göztepe	27–29	25–17	25–20	25–17		102–83	Report

Date	Time		Score		Set 1	Set 2	Set 3	Set 4	Set 5	Total	Report
Week 13
21 Dec 25	14.00	Kuzeyboru	2–3	Beşiktaş	25–16	25–27	25–19	22–25	7–15	104–102	Report
21 Dec 25	14.00	Fenerbahçe Medicana	3–0	Nilüfer Belediyespor	25–16	25–14	25–19			75–49	Report
21 Dec 25	14.00	İlbank	0–3	Zeren	22–25	16–25	22–25			60–75	Report
21 Dec 25	14.30	VakıfBank	3–0	Türk Hava Yolları	25–16	25–23	25–22			75–61	Report
21 Dec 25	15.00	Aydın Bş. Bld.	0–3	Eczacıbaşı Dynavit	12–25	22–25	20–25			54–75	Report
21 Dec 25	16.00	Bahçelievler Bel.	0–3	Aras Kargo	13–25	17–25	15–25			45–75	Report
21 Dec 25	17.00	Göztepe	1–3	Galatasaray Daikin	20–25	17–25	25–22	21–25		83–97	Report

==== Second Half (Weeks 14-26) ====
Date	Time		Score		Set 1	Set 2	Set 3	Set 4	Set 5	Total	Report
Week 14
3 Jan 26	14.00	Kuzeyboru	2–3	Eczacıbaşı Dynavit	21–25	28–26	21–25	25–17	13–15	108–108	Report
3 Jan 26	14.00	İlbank	0–3	Beşiktaş	16–25	20–25	13–25			49–75	Report
3 Jan 26	15.00	Aydın Bş. Bld.	0–3	Galatasaray Daikin	19–25	23–25	11–25			53–75	Report
3 Jan 26	16.00	Bahçelievler Bel.	1–3	Türk Hava Yolları	25–21	12–25	16–25	14–25		67–96	Report
3 Jan 26	16.00	Fenerbahçe Medicana	3–0	Aras Kargo	28–26	25–14	25–22			78–62	Report
3 Jan 26	18.00	Nilüfer Belediyespor	3–1	Göztepe	25–23	27–25	22–25	25–20		99–93	Report
3 Jan 26	18.00	VakıfBank	3–1	Zeren	23–25	25–23	25–23	25–21		98–92	Report

Date	Time		Score		Set 1	Set 2	Set 3	Set 4	Set 5	Total	Report
Week 15
10 Jan 26	14.00	Türk Hava Yolları	3–2	Fenerbahçe Medicana	18–25	28–26	26–24	15–25	15–12	102–112	Report
10 Jan 26	15.00	Göztepe	3–0	Aydın Bş. Bld.	26–24	25–23	25–18			76–65	Report
10 Jan 26	16.00	Zeren	3–0	Bahçelievler Bel.	25–12	25–8	25–19			75–39	Report
10 Jan 26	18.00	Eczacıbaşı Dynavit	3–0	İlbank	25–18	25–23	25–9			75–50	Report
10 Jan 26	19.00	Galatasaray Daikin	3–1	Kuzeyboru	25–19	25–14	22–25	25–20		97–78	Report
10 Jan 26	19.30	Aras Kargo	3–0	Nilüfer Belediyespor	25–19	25–17	25–13			75–49	Report
11 Jan 26	14.00	Beşiktaş	1–3	VakıfBank	14–25	23–25	25–23	14–25		76–98	Report

Date	Time		Score		Set 1	Set 2	Set 3	Set 4	Set 5	Total	Report
Week 16
17 Jan 26	14.00	Fenerbahçe Medicana	2–3	Zeren	22–25	25–21	23–25	25–22	14–16	109–109	Report
17 Jan 26	14.00	Kuzeyboru	3–0	Aydın Bş. Bld.	25–19	25–22	25–16			75–57	Report
17 Jan 26	14.00	İlbank	0–3	Galatasaray Daikin	11–25	15–25	15–25			41–75	Report
17 Jan 26	16.00	Bahçelievler Bel.	0–3	Beşiktaş	19–25	19–25	21–25			59–75	Report
17 Jan 26	18.00	Nilüfer Belediyespor	0–3	Türk Hava Yolları	25–27	16–25	21–25			62–77	Report
17 Jan 26	19.00	Aras Kargo	3–2	Göztepe	25–14	25–20	18–25	19–25	15–11	102–95	Report
18 Jan 26	19.00	VakıfBank	1–3	Eczacıbaşı Dynavit	18–25	26–24	20–25	18–25		82–99	Report

Date	Time		Score		Set 1	Set 2	Set 3	Set 4	Set 5	Total	Report
Week 17
20 Jan 26	13.00	Zeren	3–0	Nilüfer Belediyespor	25–21	25–22	25–23			75–66	Report
20 Jan 26	14.00	Türk Hava Yolları	3–1	Aras Kargo	25–21	16–25	25–18	25–19		91–83	Report
20 Jan 26	18.00	Göztepe	0–3	Kuzeyboru	20–25	21–25	21–25			62–75	Report
20 Jan 26	18.00	Aydın Bş. Bld.	3–2	İlbank	24–26	16–25	25–22	25–20	15–13	105–106	Report
20 Jan 26	19.00	Beşiktaş	1–3	Fenerbahçe Medicana	14–25	18–25	25–21	19–25		76–96	Report
21 Jan 26	17.00	Galatasaray Daikin	0–3	VakıfBank	17–25	18–25	15–25			50–75	Report
21 Jan 26	18.00	Eczacıbaşı Dynavit	3–0	Bahçelievler Bel.	25–21	25–15	25–10			75–46	Report

Date	Time		Score		Set 1	Set 2	Set 3	Set 4	Set 5	Total	Report
Week 18
24 Jan 26	14.00	İlbank	1–3	Kuzeyboru	11–25	25–22	24–26	20–25		80–98	Report
24 Jan 26	14.00	VakıfBank	3–0	Aydın Bş. Bld.	25–16	25–20	25–16			75–52	Report
24 Jan 26	14.00	Türk Hava Yolları	2–3	Göztepe	25–15	23–25	25–23	20–25	13–15	106–103	Report
24 Jan 26	15.30	Aras Kargo	0–3	Zeren	25–27	16–25	16–25			57–77	Report
24 Jan 26	16.00	Bahçelievler Bel.	0–3	Galatasaray Daikin	17–25	18–25	21–25			56–75	Report
24 Jan 26	18.00	Nilüfer Belediyespor	3–1	Beşiktaş	28–26	18–25	25–19	25–22		96–92	Report
24 Jan 26	19.00	Fenerbahçe Medicana	3–1	Eczacıbaşı Dynavit	25–12	25–23	18–25	25–22		93–82	Report

Date	Time		Score		Set 1	Set 2	Set 3	Set 4	Set 5	Total	Report
Week 19
31 Jan 26	14.00	Kuzeyboru	0–3	VakıfBank	15–25	18–25	20–25			53–75	Report
31 Jan 26	15.00	Aydın Bş. Bld.	2–3	Bahçelievler Bel.	18–25	23–25	25–21	27–25	12–15	105–111	Report
31 Jan 26	16.30	Zeren	3–2	Türk Hava Yolları	25–22	19–25	22–25	25–17	15–13	106–102	Report
31 Jan 26	16.30	Göztepe	3–0	İlbank	25–16	25–18	25–18			75–52	Report
31 Jan 26	17.00	Beşiktaş	3–1	Aras Kargo	27–25	25–19	21–25	25–20		98–89	Report
31 Jan 26	19.00	Eczacıbaşı Dynavit	3–1	Nilüfer Belediyespor	22–25	25–23	25–9	25–14		97–71	Report
1 Feb 26	17.00	Galatasaray Daikin	0–3	Fenerbahçe Medicana	19–25	13–25	23–25			55–75	Report

Date	Time		Score		Set 1	Set 2	Set 3	Set 4	Set 5	Total	Report
Week 20
7 Feb 26	14.00	Zeren	3–0	Göztepe	25–16	25–21	28–26			78–63	Report
7 Feb 26	14.00	VakıfBank	3–0	İlbank	25–19	25–18	25–20			75–57	Report
7 Feb 26	15.00	Fenerbahçe Medicana	3–0	Aydın Bş. Bld.	25–22	25–10	25–16			75–48	Report
7 Feb 26	15.30	Aras Kargo	3–2	Eczacıbaşı Dynavit	25–23	18–25	23–25	29–27	15–10	110–110	Report
7 Feb 26	16.00	Bahçelievler Bel.	1–3	Kuzeyboru	20–25	25–20	9–25	16–25		70–95	Report
7 Feb 26	18.00	Nilüfer Belediyespor	3–0	Galatasaray Daikin	28–26	25–16	27–25			80–67	Report
7 Feb 26	19.00	Türk Hava Yolları	1–3	Beşiktaş	25–23	22–25	17–25	17–25		81–98	Report

Date	Time		Score		Set 1	Set 2	Set 3	Set 4	Set 5	Total	Report
Week 21
10 Feb 26	15.00	İlbank	3–1	Bahçelievler Bel.	25–23	23–25	25–23	25–23		98–94	Report
10 Feb 26	15.30	Kuzeyboru	1–3	Fenerbahçe Medicana	14–25	19–25	25–16	19–25		77–91	Report
10 Feb 26	18.00	Göztepe	1–3	VakıfBank	17–25	25–21	10–25	21–25		73–96	Report
10 Feb 26	18.30	Eczacıbaşı Dynavit	3–0	Türk Hava Yolları	25–14	25–23	25–23			75–60	Report
10 Feb 26	19.00	Aydın Bş. Bld.	1–3	Nilüfer Belediyespor	25–23	22–25	23–25	21–25		91–98	Report
10 Feb 26	19.00	Galatasaray Daikin	3–1	Aras Kargo	20–25	25–19	25–21	25–14		95–79	Report
10 Feb 26	19.00	Beşiktaş	0–3	Zeren	23–25	20–25	13–25			56–75	Report

Date	Time		Score		Set 1	Set 2	Set 3	Set 4	Set 5	Total	Report
Week 22
14 Feb 26	14.00	Fenerbahçe Medicana	3–0	İlbank	25–21	25–21	25–20			75–62	Report
14 Feb 26	14.00	Zeren	3–2	Eczacıbaşı Dynavit	25–22	27–25	17–25	27–29	15–13	111–114	Report
14 Feb 26	16.00	Bahçelievler Bel.	0–3	VakıfBank	21–25	23–25	20–25			64–75	Report
14 Feb 26	16.00	Aras Kargo	3–0	Aydın Bş. Bld.	25–16	25–12	25–19			75–47	Report
14 Feb 26	17.00	Beşiktaş	1–3	Göztepe	24–26	25–17	16–25	20–25		85–93	Report
14 Feb 26	18.00	Nilüfer Belediyespor	3–2	Kuzeyboru	25–21	20–25	25–16	21–15	15–12	106–89	Report
14 Feb 26	19.00	Türk Hava Yolları	2–3	Galatasaray Daikin	25–23	22–25	25–16	19–25	12–15	103–104	Report

Date	Time		Score		Set 1	Set 2	Set 3	Set 4	Set 5	Total	Report
Week 23
21 Feb 26	14.00	İlbank	3–2	Nilüfer Belediyespor	25–19	22–25	25–23	17–25	21–19	110–111	Report
21 Feb 26	14.00	Galatasaray Daikin	3–1	Zeren	25–14	25–18	22–25	25–22		97–79	Report
21 Feb 26	14.00	Kuzeyboru	3–0	Aras Kargo	31–29	25–14	25–22			81–65	Report
21 Feb 26	15.00	Aydın Bş. Bld.	2–3	Türk Hava Yolları	25–18	25–17	13–25	17–25	9–15	89–100	Report
21 Feb 26	16.00	Eczacıbaşı Dynavit	3–0	Beşiktaş	25–11	25–18	25–20			75–49	Report
21 Feb 26	16.00	Göztepe	3–0	Bahçelievler Bel.	25–13	25–21	25–20			75–54	Report
21 Feb 26	20.00	VakıfBank	3–1	Fenerbahçe Medicana	23–25	25–22	26–24	25–21		99–92	Report

Date	Time		Score		Set 1	Set 2	Set 3	Set 4	Set 5	Total	Report
Week 24
27 Feb 26	18.00	Fenerbahçe Medicana	3–0	Bahçelievler Bel.	25–11	25–11	25–14			75–36	Report
28 Feb 26	13.00	Beşiktaş	2–3	Galatasaray Daikin	15–25	25–22	22–25	25–23	8–15	95–110	Report
28 Feb 26	14.00	Zeren	3–1	Aydın Bş. Bld.	25–16	22–25	25–16	25–18		97–75	Report
28 Feb 26	16.00	Nilüfer Belediyespor	0–3	VakıfBank	24–26	16–25	11–25			51–76	Report
28 Feb 26	16.00	Eczacıbaşı Dynavit	3–1	Göztepe	25–9	25–8	22–25	26–24		98–66	Report
28 Feb 26	16.00	Aras Kargo	3–2	İlbank	22–25	25–22	20–25	25–10	15–7	107–89	Report
28 Feb 26	16.00	Türk Hava Yolları	3–0	Kuzeyboru	25–18	27–25	25–21			77–64	Report

Date	Time		Score		Set 1	Set 2	Set 3	Set 4	Set 5	Total	Report
Week 25
6 Mar 26	15.30	VakıfBank	3–0	Aras Kargo	25–21	25–20	25–22			75–63	Report
7 Mar 26	13.00	Kuzeyboru	1–3	Zeren	21–25	21–25	27–25	15–25		84–100	Report
7 Mar 26	14.00	İlbank	3–1	Türk Hava Yolları	16–25	25–18	25–20	25–23		91–86	Report
7 Mar 26	15.00	Aydın Bş. Bld.	2–3	Beşiktaş	16–25	13–25	25–22	25–23	8–15	87–110	Report
7 Mar 26	15.30	Göztepe	2–3	Fenerbahçe Medicana	25–20	19–25	25–22	23–25	11–15	103–107	Report
7 Mar 26	16.00	Bahçelievler Bel.	0–3	Nilüfer Belediyespor	12–25	20–25	20–25			52–75	Report
7 Mar 26	20.00	Galatasaray Daikin	2–3	Eczacıbaşı Dynavit	23–25	25–22	25–23	18–25	9–15	100–110	Report

Date	Time		Score		Set 1	Set 2	Set 3	Set 4	Set 5	Total	Report
Week 26
14 Mar 26	13.00	Nilüfer Belediyespor	0–3	Fenerbahçe Medicana	16–25	21–25	29–31			66–81	Report
14 Mar 26	13.00	Galatasaray Daikin	0–3	Göztepe	21–25	20–25	20–25			61–75	Report
14 Mar 26	14.00	Beşiktaş	0–3	Kuzeyboru	16–25	22–25	20–25			58–75	Report
14 Mar 26	14.00	Zeren	3–0	İlbank	25–21	25–22	25–20			75–63	Report
14 Mar 26	14.00	Eczacıbaşı Dynavit	3–2	Aydın Bş. Bld.	23–25	25–22	24–26	25–19	15–11	112–103	Report
14 Mar 26	16.00	Aras Kargo	3–0	Bahçelievler Bel.	25–9	25–16	25–18			75–43	Report
14 Mar 26	16.00	Türk Hava Yolları	2–3	VakıfBank	25–23	14–25	17–25	25–20	11–15	92–108	Report

== Play-offs ==
The play-off stage included championship and classification rounds. VakıfBank and Fenerbahçe Medicana advanced to the final series.

=== Championship play-offs ===
Sources: VolleyStation results and Turkish Volleyball Federation play-off report.

==== First leg ====
Date	Time	Team 1	Score	Team 2	Set 1	Set 2	Set 3	Set 4	Set 5	Total	Report
29 Mar	18:00	Zeren Ankara (Turkey)	0–3	(Turkey) Fenerbahçe Medicana Istanbul	17–25	22–25	19–25			58–75	Report
30 Mar	19:00	Eczacıbaşı Istanbul (Turkey)	0–3	(Turkey) VakıfBank Istanbul	18–25	19–25	20–25			57–75	Report

==== Second leg ====
Date	Time	Team 1	Score	Team 2	Set 1	Set 2	Set 3	Set 4	Set 5	Total	Report
2 Apr	19:00	Fenerbahçe Medicana Istanbul (Turkey)	3–1	(Turkey) Zeren Ankara	24–26	26–24	25–21	27–25		102–96	Report
2 Apr	19:00	VakıfBank Istanbul (Turkey)	3–2	(Turkey) Eczacıbaşı Istanbul	25–14	29–31	22–25	25–22	15–13	116–105	Report

=== Final series ===
VakıfBank won the best-of-five final series 3–2.

==== Match 1 ====
Date	Time	Team 1	Score	Team 2	Set 1	Set 2	Set 3	Set 4	Set 5	Total	Report
7 Apr	19:00	Fenerbahçe Medicana Istanbul (Turkey)	0–3	(Turkey) VakıfBank Istanbul	18–25	23–25	21–25			62–75	Report

==== Match 2 ====
Date	Time	Team 1	Score	Team 2	Set 1	Set 2	Set 3	Set 4	Set 5	Total	Report
11 Apr	17:00	VakıfBank Istanbul (Turkey)	1–3	(Turkey) Fenerbahçe Medicana Istanbul	25–19	18–25	18–25	20–25		81–94	Report

==== Match 3 ====
Date	Time	Team 1	Score	Team 2	Set 1	Set 2	Set 3	Set 4	Set 5	Total	Report
13 Apr	19:00	VakıfBank Istanbul (Turkey)	3–1	(Turkey) Fenerbahçe Medicana Istanbul	19–25	25–19	25–18	25–23		94–85	Report

==== Match 4 ====
Date	Time	Team 1	Score	Team 2	Set 1	Set 2	Set 3	Set 4	Set 5	Total	Report
16 Apr	19:00	Fenerbahçe Medicana Istanbul (Turkey)	3–2	(Turkey) VakıfBank Istanbul	21–25	25–19	25–22	18–25	15–11	104–102	Report

==== Match 5 ====
Date	Time	Team 1	Score	Team 2	Set 1	Set 2	Set 3	Set 4	Set 5	Total	Report
19 Apr	19:00	VakıfBank Istanbul (Turkey)	3–1	(Turkey) Fenerbahçe Medicana Istanbul	23–25	29–27	25–20	25–19		102–91	Report

Source: VolleyStation final series results and Turkish Volleyball Federation final report.

=== Final match 5 details ===
The decisive fifth match was played at VakıfBank Spor Sarayı. VakıfBank defeated Fenerbahçe Medicana 3–1. The match lasted 131 minutes and was refereed by Erdal Akıncı and Ebru Kaya.

Team	Starting players and substitutes listed by TVF
(Turkey) VakıfBank	Derya, Ogbogu, Cansu, Markova, Zehra, Boskovic, Ayça (L); Cazaute, Deniz, Dangubic
(Turkey) Fenerbahçe Medicana	Eda, Arelya, Fedorovtseva, Korneluk, Vargas, Ana Cristina, Gizem (L); Gülce (L), Sude, Hande, Orro, Bedart Ghani, Aslı

== Awards ==
Award	Player	Club
Most valuable player	Marina Markova (RUS)	(Turkey) VakıfBank
Fastest serve	Melissa Vargas (TUR)	(Turkey) Fenerbahçe Medicana

Melissa Vargas received the fastest serve award after a 111.96 km/h serve measured in the first match of the final series.

== European qualification ==
VakıfBank and Fenerbahçe Medicana qualified to represent Turkey in the 2026 edition of the CEV Women's Champions League.
