= Sultans League =

Top tier of professional women's volleyball in Turkey

Vodafone Sultanlar Ligi
- Current season, competition or edition: 2026–27 Turkish Women's Volleyball League
- Sport: Volleyball
- Founded: 1984; 42 years ago
- First season: 1984–85
- Administrator: Turkish Volleyball Federation
- No. of teams: 14
- Country: Turkey
- Confederation: CEV
- Continent: Europe
- Most recent champion: VakıfBank (15th title) (2025–26)
- Most titles: Eczacıbaşı (16 titles)
- Broadcasters: TRT Spor; TRT Spor Yıldız
- Sponsor: Vodafone
- Level on pyramid: Level 1
- Relegation to: 1. Ligi
- Domestic cups: Turkish Cup; Turkish SuperCup
- International cups: CEV Champions League; CEV Cup; CEV Challenge Cup
- Website: Sultanlar Ligi

Sultanlar Ligi (Sultans League), known for sponsorship reasons as Vodafone Sultanlar Ligi, is the highest professional women's volleyball league in Turkey. It is run by the Turkish Volleyball Federation and began with the 1984–85 season. 14 clubs are currently participating in the league. It is often regarded as the best professional women's volleyball league in the world. Its clubs have obtained significant successes in European and other international competitions. Eczacıbaşı are the most successful club, having won 16 championships so far.

It succeeded the former Turkish Women's Volleyball Championship (1956–1984).

== Teams ==
The following teams compete in the Sultanlar Ligi.

=== 2026–27 season ===
Vodafone Sultanlar Ligi
| City | Team | Arena |
| Afyonkarahisar | Afyon Bld. | Prof. Dr. Veysel Eroğlu Sport Hall |
| Istanbul | Beşiktaş | BJK Süleyman Seba Sports Hall |
| Istanbul | Eczacıbaşı Dynavit | Eczacıbaşı Sports Hall |
| Istanbul | Fenerbahçe | TVF Burhan Felek Sport Hall |
| Istanbul | Galatasaray | TVF Burhan Felek Sport Hall |
| Istanbul | Türk Hava Yolları | TVF Burhan Felek Sport Hall |
| Istanbul | VakıfBank | VakıfBank Sports Palace |
| Ankara | İller Bankası | Selim Sırrı Tarcan Sport Hall |
| Ankara | Zeren | Başkent Volleyball Hall |
| İzmir | Aras Kargo | İzmir Atatürk Volleyball Hall |
| İzmir | Göztepe | İzmir Atatürk Volleyball Hall |
| Bursa | Nilüfer Bld. | Bursa Atatürk Sport Hall |
| Aksaray | Kuzeyboru | Aksaray Atatürk Sport Hall |
| Manisa | Manisa BB | Manisa Tarık Almış Sport Hall |

== Title holders ==
- 1984–85 Eczacıbaşı
- 1985–86 Eczacıbaşı
- 1986–87 Eczacıbaşı
- 1987–88 Eczacıbaşı
- 1988–89 Eczacıbaşı
- 1989–90 Emlak Bankası
- 1990–91 Emlak Bankası
- 1991–92 VakıfBank
- 1992–93 VakıfBank
- 1993–94 Eczacıbaşı
- 1994–95 Eczacıbaşı
- 1995–96 Emlak Bankası
- 1996–97 VakıfBank
- 1997–98 VakıfBank
- 1998–99 Eczacıbaşı
- 1999–00 Eczacıbaşı
- 2000–01 Eczacıbaşı
- 2001–02 Eczacıbaşı
- 2002–03 Eczacıbaşı
- 2003–04 VakıfBank
- 2004–05 VakıfBank
- 2005–06 Eczacıbaşı
- 2006–07 Eczacıbaşı
- 2007–08 Eczacıbaşı
- 2008–09 Fenerbahçe
- 2009–10 Fenerbahçe
- 2010–11 Fenerbahçe
- 2011–12 Eczacıbaşı
- 2012–13 Vakıfbank
- 2013–14 VakıfBank
- 2014–15 Fenerbahçe
- 2015–16 VakıfBank
- 2016–17 Fenerbahçe
- 2017–18 VakıfBank
- 2018–19 VakıfBank
- 2019–20 Canceled due to the COVID-19 pandemic in Turkey
- 2020–21 VakıfBank
- 2021–22 VakıfBank
- 2022–23 Fenerbahçe
- 2023–24 Fenerbahçe
- 2024–25 VakıfBank
- 2025–26 VakıfBank

== Performance by club ==
| Club | Titles | Winning years |
|---|---|---|
| Eczacıbaşı | 16 | 1985, 1986, 1987, 1988, 1989, 1994, 1995, 1999, 2000, 2001, 2002, 2003, 2006, 2007, 2008, 2012 |
| VakıfBank | 15 | 1992, 1993, 1997, 1998, 2004, 2005, 2013, 2014, 2016, 2018, 2019, 2021, 2022, 2025, 2026 |
| Fenerbahçe | 7 | 2009, 2010, 2011, 2015, 2017, 2023, 2024 |
| Emlak Bankası | 3 | 1990, 1991, 1996 |

== MVP by Edition ==
- 2007–08 – Taismary Agüero (ITA)
- 2008–09 – Seda Tokatlıoğlu (TUR)
- 2009–10 – Yekaterina Gamova (RUS)
- 2010–11 – Lyubov Sokolova (RUS)
- 2011–12 – Esra Gümüş (TUR)
- 2012–13 – Gözde Kırdar (TUR)
- 2013–14 – Gözde Kırdar (TUR)
- 2014–15 – Kim Yeon-koung (KOR)
- 2015–16 – Kimberly Hill (USA)
- 2016–17 – Natália Pereira (BRA)
- 2017–18 – Zhu Ting (CHN)
- 2018–19 – Zhu Ting (CHN)
- 2019–20 – cancelled
- 2020–21 – Isabelle Haak (SWE)
- 2021–22 – Zehra Güneş (TUR)
- 2022–23 – Melissa Vargas (TUR)
- 2023–24 – Melissa Vargas (TUR)
- 2024–25 – Cansu Özbay (TUR)
- 2025–26 – Marina Markova (RUS)

== All-time team records ==
Summary by team since 1977/1978

| Team | Victories | First Victory | Last Victory |
|---|---|---|---|
| Eczacıbaşı Istanbul | 23 | 1977/1978 | 2011/2012 |
| Vakifbank Istanbul | 9 | 1992/1993 | 2021/2022 |
| Fenerbahçe Istanbul | 7 | 2008/2009 | 2023/2024 |
| Vakifbank Ankara | 3 | 1991/1992 | 1997/1998 |
| Emlakbank Ankara | 3 | 1989/1990 | 1995/1996 |

| Team | Winners | Second place | Third place |
|---|---|---|---|
| Eczacıbaşı Istanbul | 23 | 4 | 2 |
| Vakifbank Istanbul | 9 | 4 | 1 |
| Fenerbahçe Istanbul | 7 | 4 | 2 |
| Vakifbank Ankara | 3 | 0 | 0 |
| Emlakbank Ankara | 3 | 0 | 0 |
| Galatasaray Istanbul | | 1 | 0 |
| THY SK Istanbul | | | 1 |

Podiums by city since 1977/1978

| Location | Winners | Second place | Third place |
|---|---|---|---|
| Istanbul | 39 | 13 | 6 |
| Ankara | 6 | 0 | 0 |

Various statistics since 2009/2010

Number of appearances
| 1 | Eczacıbaşı Istanbul | 13 |
| 2 | Fenerbahçe Istanbul | 13 |
| 3 | Galatasaray Istanbul | 13 |
| 4 | Vakifbank Istanbul | 13 |
| 5 | Nilüfer Belediyespor Bursa | 12 |
| 6 | Beşiktaş Istanbul | 11 |
| 7 | Ilbank SK Ankara | 9 |
| 8 | Yeşilyurt SK | 8 |
| 9 | Sarıyer Istanbul | 7 |
| 10 | Bursa BBSK | 6 |

Number of matches
| 1 | Vakifbank Istanbul | 352 |
| 2 | Fenerbahçe Istanbul | 343 |
| 3 | Eczacıbaşı Istanbul | 341 |
| 4 | Galatasaray Istanbul | 334 |
| 5 | Nilüfer Belediyespor Bursa | 281 |
| 6 | Beşiktaş Istanbul | 277 |
| 7 | Ilbank SK Ankara | 230 |
| 8 | Yeşilyurt SK | 171 |
| 9 | Bursa BBSK | 153 |
| 10 | Çanakkale Belediyespor | 151 |

Wins
| 1 | Vakifbank Istanbul | 310 |
| 2 | Fenerbahçe Istanbul | 290 |
| 3 | Eczacıbaşı Istanbul | 274 |
| 4 | Galatasaray Istanbul | 207 |
| 5 | Nilüfer Belediyespor Bursa | 122 |
| 6 | Beşiktaş Istanbul | 89 |
| 7 | Bursa BBSK | 76 |
| 8 | Ilbank SK Ankara | 75 |
| 9 | Sarıyer Istanbul | 56 |
| 10 | Yeşilyurt SK | 56 |

Number of wins in games played
| 1 | Vakifbank Istanbul | 88 % |
| 2 | Fenerbahçe Istanbul | 85 % |
| 3 | Eczacıbaşı Istanbul | 80 % |
| 4 | Galatasaray Istanbul | 62 % |
| 5 | THY SK Istanbul | 58 % |
| 6 | Bursa BBSK | 50 % |
| 7 | Aydin Büyüksehir Bld Spor | 46 % |
| 8 | Ankara PTT SK | 44 % |
| 9 | Nilüfer Belediyespor Bursa | 43 % |
| 10 | Seramiksan SK | 38 % |

(Based on W=2 pts and D=1 pts)

| | Team | S | Firs | Best | Pts | MP | W | L | GF | GA | diff |
|---|---|---|---|---|---|---|---|---|---|---|---|
| 1 | Vakifbank Istanbul | 13 | 2009/2010 | 1st | 662 | 352 | 310 | 42 | 975 | 247 | +728 |
| 2 | Fenerbahçe Istanbul | 13 | 2009/2010 | 1st | 633 | 343 | 290 | 53 | 922 | 283 | +639 |
| 3 | Eczacıbaşı Istanbul | 13 | 2009/2010 | 1st | 615 | 341 | 274 | 67 | 889 | 333 | +556 |
| 4 | Galatasaray Istanbul | 13 | 2009/2010 | 2nd | 541 | 334 | 207 | 127 | 719 | 517 | +202 |
| 5 | Nilüfer Belediyespor Bursa | 12 | 2009/2010 | - | 403 | 281 | 122 | 159 | 463 | 578 | -115 |
| 6 | Beşiktaş Istanbul | 11 | 2009/2010 | - | 366 | 277 | 89 | 188 | 375 | 643 | -268 |
| 7 | Ilbank SK Ankara | 9 | 2009/2010 | - | 305 | 230 | 75 | 155 | 309 | 535 | -226 |
| 8 | Bursa BBSK | 6 | 2012/2013 | - | 229 | 153 | 76 | 77 | 292 | 279 | +13 |
| 9 | Yeşilyurt SK | 8 | 2009/2010 | - | 227 | 171 | 56 | 115 | 236 | 395 | -159 |
| 10 | Sarıyer Istanbul | 7 | 2012/2013 | - | 206 | 150 | 56 | 94 | 215 | 335 | -120 |
| 11 | Çanakkale Belediyespor | 6 | 2013/2014 | - | 201 | 151 | 50 | 101 | 214 | 355 | -141 |
| 12 | Halkbank Ankara | 5 | 2013/2014 | - | 173 | 136 | 37 | 99 | 183 | 332 | -149 |
| 13 | BSK Istanbul | 5 | 2009/2010 | - | 159 | 130 | 29 | 101 | 116 | 331 | -215 |
| 14 | Ereğli Belediyespor | 5 | 2009/2010 | - | 142 | 112 | 30 | 82 | 129 | 264 | -135 |
| 15 | THY SK Istanbul | 4 | 2018/2019 | 3rd | 136 | 86 | 50 | 36 | 168 | 144 | +24 |
| 16 | Aydin Büyüksehir Bld Spor | 4 | 2018/2019 | - | 123 | 84 | 39 | 45 | 153 | 161 | -8 |
| 17 | Ankara Karayollari | 4 | 2018/2019 | - | 109 | 80 | 29 | 51 | 127 | 176 | -49 |
| 18 | Trabzon Idman Ocagi | 3 | 2014/2015 | - | 104 | 80 | 24 | 56 | 109 | 195 | -86 |
| 19 | MKE Ankaragücü | 3 | 2009/2010 | - | 87 | 70 | 17 | 53 | 76 | 179 | -103 |
| 20 | TED Ankara Kolejliler | 3 | 2010/2011 | - | 86 | 69 | 17 | 52 | 79 | 166 | -87 |
| 21 | Seramiksan SK | 2 | 2016/2017 | - | 77 | 56 | 21 | 35 | 96 | 128 | -32 |
| 22 | Ankara PTT SK | 3 | 2019/2020 | - | 75 | 52 | 23 | 29 | 89 | 103 | -14 |
| 23 | DYO Karsiyaka Izmir | 2 | 2009/2010 | - | 52 | 44 | 8 | 36 | 46 | 116 | -70 |
| 24 | Kuzeyboru SK | 2 | 2020/2021 | - | 41 | 30 | 11 | 19 | 49 | 67 | -18 |
| 25 | Çan Gençlik Kale SK | 1 | 2020/2021 | - | 37 | 30 | 7 | 23 | 36 | 72 | -36 |
| 26 | Salihli Belediye Spor | 1 | 2015/2016 | - | 32 | 28 | 4 | 24 | 26 | 78 | -52 |
| 27 | Pursaklar V. Ihtisas | 1 | 2011/2012 | - | 26 | 22 | 4 | 18 | 27 | 59 | -32 |
| 28 | Dicle üniversitesi | 1 | 2010/2011 | - | 24 | 22 | 2 | 20 | 14 | 61 | -47 |
| 29 | Vakifbank Ankara | 1 | 2017/2018 | - | 0 | 0 | 0 | 0 | 0 | 0 | 0 |

== See also ==
  - Men's
- Turkish Men's Volleyball League
- Turkish Men's Volleyball Cup
- Turkish Men's Volleyball Super Cup
  - Women's
- Turkish Women's Volleyball Cup
- Turkish Women's Volleyball Super Cup
