= Platform Garanti Contemporary Art Center =

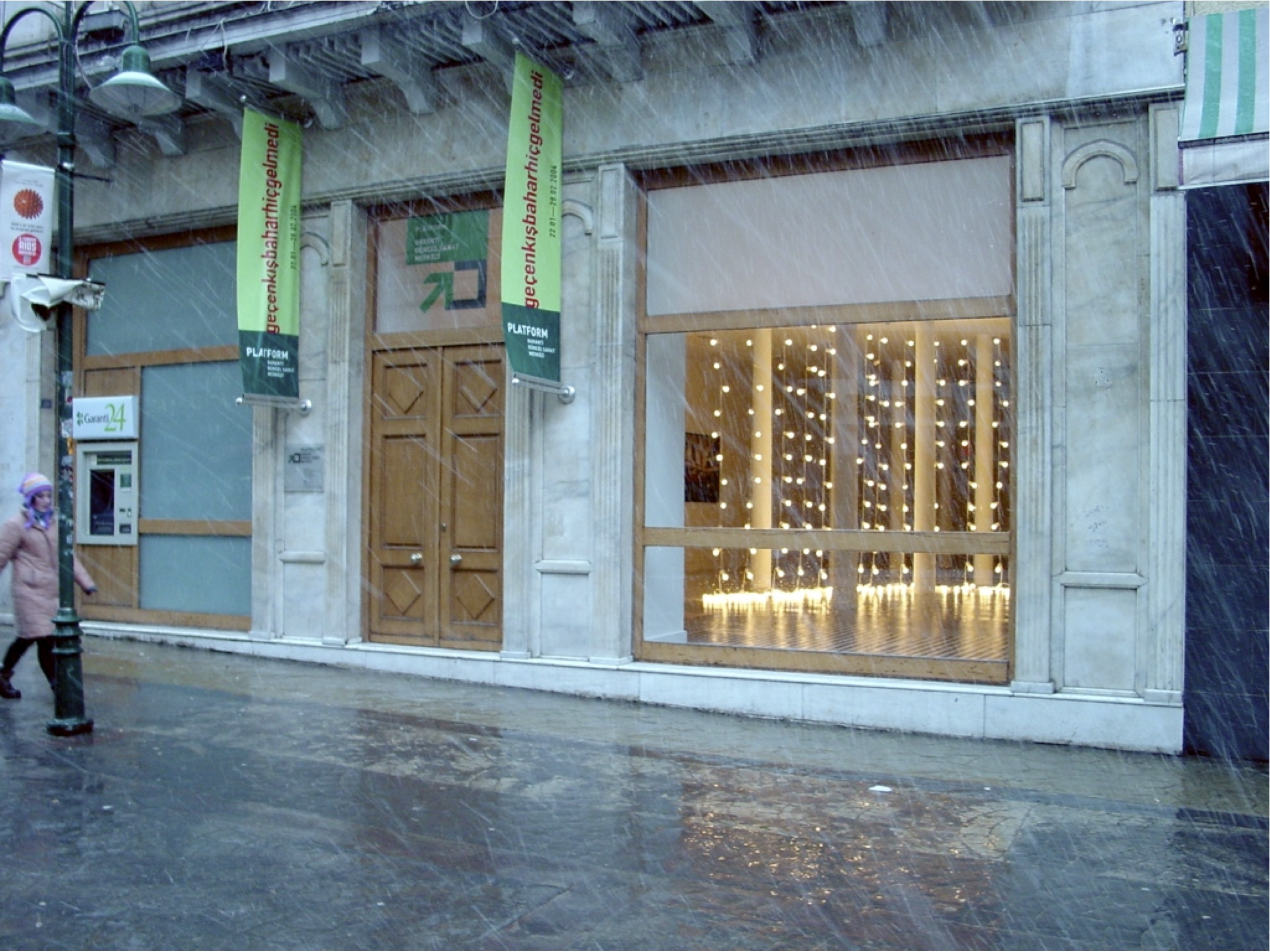
Platform Garanti

The contemporary art institution Platform Garanti Contemporary Art Center opened in 2001 and was located on the pedestrian Istiklal Avenue in Istanbul, Turkey. Platform Garanti organized exhibitions; conferences and events; hosted an international residency program; and maintained a library and archive of contemporary art.

== History ==
Platform was founded by Vasif Kortun initially with the support of the Ottoman Bank and later, once the Ottoman Bank had been incorporated under a different name, by Garanti Bank. Directed by Vasif Kortun throughout its term, other key members of the team included Esra Sarigedik Öktem (who went on to work at Van Abbemuseum and later the British Council) and November Paynter who moved to Istanbul in 2003 following completion of a Masters in Curating Contemporary Art at the Royal College of Art, London. Platform Garanti took a break from its exhibition program at the end of 2007 and formally ended its activities under this name in 2010. In 2008 major renovations of Platform Garanti's original Istiklal Avenue venue and the former Ottoman Bank Headquarters in Galata, were initiated in order to combine elements of Platform's previous activities with two other cultural entities: Garanti Gallery and the Ottoman Bank Archives and Research Centre under the common name: SALT; a public company operating under Garanti Kültür Inc.

== Exhibitions in Istanbul ==
Between 2001 and 2007, Platform organized over 40 exhibitions in Istanbul. Notable exhibitions included:

Subtracting of Zeroes, Mladen Stilinović, 2007

The exhibition Subtracting of Zeroes pivoted around the issue of economy with reference to the previous use of Platform's building as a bank in the 1980s. A selection from Stilinović's production of over 70 artist books, from the 1970s to today, were exhibited in the mezzanine.

Open Library, 2007

Open Library was a rethinking of Platform's well-visited exhibition space in the form of a library. By setting up an unexpected threshold between the street outside and the normally white-walled gallery, Platform’s function became blurred and its status could be perceived as a library or as idiosyncratic exhibition. Open Library was designed by Istanbul-based architecture practice superpool in collaboration with quinze & milan.

Normalization, 2005

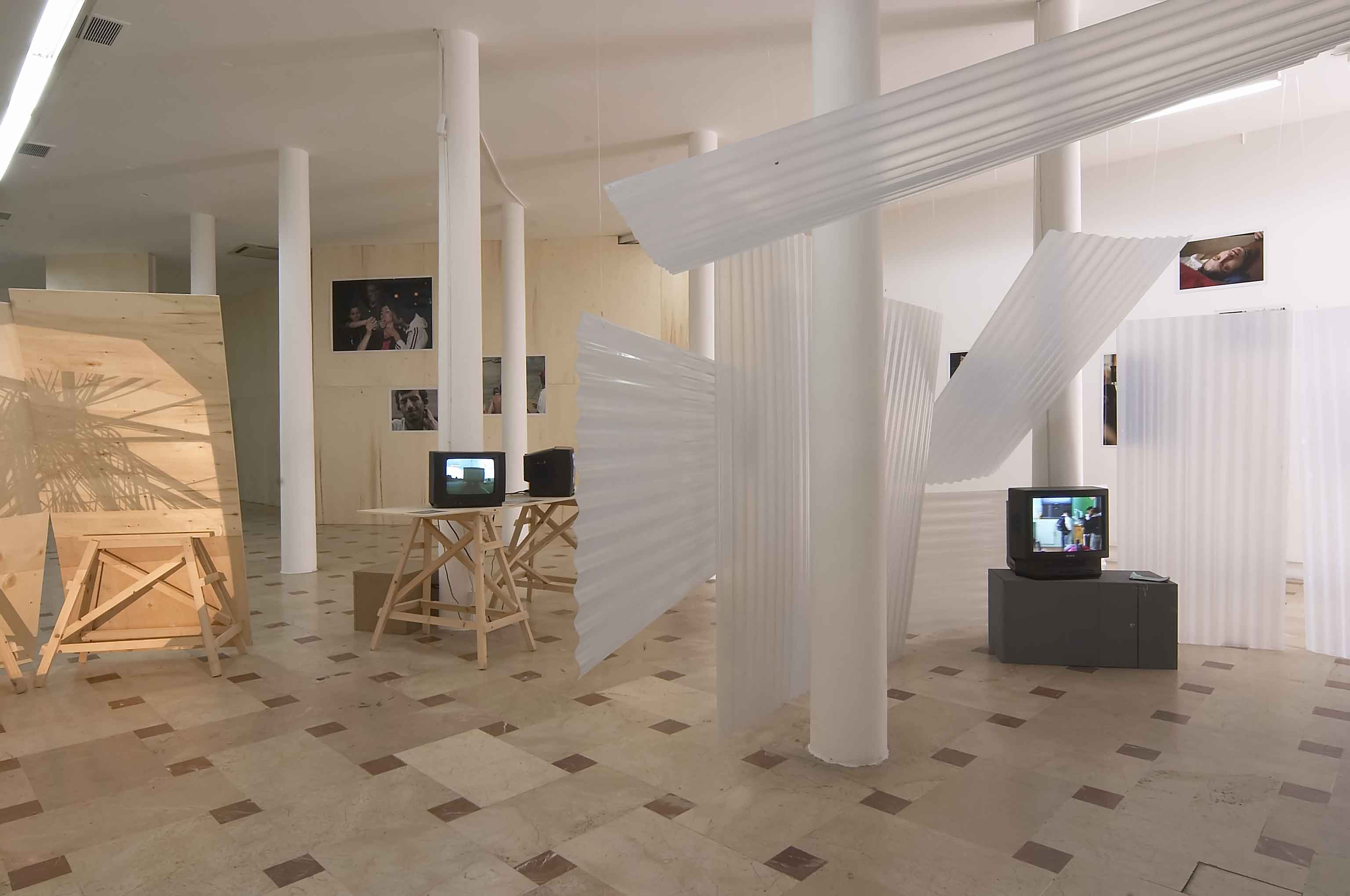
Normalization

In 2003 Platform Garanti was invited by Rooseum, Malmö and WHW, Zagreb as a third collaborator in a series of discussions, exhibitions and publication, which would take as their point of departure the term 'normalization'. The ambiguity of such a term, its perception from different geographies, cultures and individuals, led Platform’s proposal to follow the notion of normalization via a route of trepidation and enquiry, resulting in a progressive art program that focused on the multiple meanings of the term, its usage, manifestation, its political and social implications via the involvement of different modes, media and protagonists. Curated by Vasif Kortun and November Paynter. Artists: Can Altay, Yael Bartana, Mark Leckey, Aydan Murtezaoglu, Phil Collins (artist), Roman Ondak, Solmaz Shahbazi, Wael Shawky, Jalal Toufic.

In addition, Platform hosted participating artists of the International Istanbul Biennials in 2005: Hüseyin Bahri Alptekin and Yael Bartana; in 2003 Shahzia Sikander; and in 2001 Carsten Nicolai.

== Exhibitions and collaborations outside Turkey ==
Platform was invited to organize exhibitions in international spaces – these included: The Columns Held us Up at Artists Space in New York in 2009; Last Things at the Westfälischer Kunstverein in Münster and the screening program Candid Stories at Insa Art Space, Seoul, in 2008. Also in 2008 Platform was one of fifteen international partner institutions that participated in the Seventh International Biennial exhibition Lucky Seven of SITE Santa Fe. In 2006, the institution was commissioned by Frieze Projects to participate in the Frieze Art Fair . In 2003, Platform was one of ten not-for-profit European institutions to participate in Institution², curated by Jens Hoffmann for KIASMA, Museum of Contemporary Art, Helsinki.

== Library and archive ==
Platform housed an archive of artist files of more than 150 artists from Turkey, both living and working in the country as well as abroad. This comprehensive library of contemporary art included: magazine publications, exhibition catalogues, monographies, rare books, catalogue raisonnés, and books on theory and philosophy. In 2007 the library was presented to the public within the gallery space of the institution as Open Library . The full holdings of this library will be available to the public within SALT Research as of November 2011.

== Talks and conferences ==
Platform organized over 120 lectures with professionals including among many others: Hou Hanru, Charles Esche, Maria Lind, Carlos Basualdo, Phillipe Vergne, Irit Rogoff, Mark Leckey, Chantal Mouffe, Maarten Hajer, Momoyo Kajima, Marcos Novak, Nikolaus Hirsch, Hans Ulrich Obrist, Nikos Papastergiadis. Platform also organized and hosted projects such as A Coffee-House: A Conversation on the International Art world and its Exclusions in 2001; Urban Flashes Istanbul: Cultural Patchworks in the Public Space in 2003 ; south ... east ... Mediterranean... Europe, a conference within the context of In the Cities of the Balkans, the 2nd part of The Balkans Trilogy initiated by Kunsthalle Fridericianum; The Next Documenta Should Be Curated By An Artist ; Archiving Disappearance organized with Krist Gruijthuijsen ; Questioning Alternative Practices all in 2006; On Support Lecture Series organized by Celine Condorelli; and the Transdisciplines Lecture series co-organized with Garanti Galeri between 2006 and 2009.

== Istanbul Residency Program ==
The Istanbul Residency Program was launched in 2003. It was supported by numerous national and regional funding bodies. From 2004 the residency program attempted to focus more specifically on inviting artists from the geographies surrounding Turkey with the support of the Open Society and the American Center Foundation. From 2006 to 2010 The Backyard Residency program, a project launched under the SEE Mobility Project (Artists' Residences in South East Europe), supported by the Nordic Council of Ministers invited four artists from the countries of South East Europe. In 2009 and 2010 the program Accented Residencies supported by the British Council provided residency opportunities again from this geography. The institution also helped a number of artists from Turkey to spend time on residency programs in other countries around the world from 2006 until 2010. The residency program at Platform was terminated at the end of 2010.

== Publications ==
Platform collaborated on a range of publications, including The Next Documenta Should be Curated by an Artist co-published by Revolver and e-flux publications ; We all Laughed at Christopher Columbus co-published with SMBA, Amsterdam and the Mondriaan Foundation, Hit & Run with SMART Project Space, Amsterdam ; Support Structures by Celine Condorelli , published by Sternberg Press ; Subtracting of Zeroes co-published with Van AbbeMuseum, Eindhoven; Today in History by Ahmet Oğüt co-published with Book Works, London.
