= Emre Hüner =

Turkish artist

Emre Hüner (born 1977, in Istanbul, Turkey) is a visual artist living and working between Istanbul, Turkey and Amsterdam, Netherlands. Working with drawing, film, sculpture, installation and writing, his work explores the construction of modernist utopian projects, setting the idea of progress against deep time, geology and archeology through eclectic assemblages that blend fiction and documentarian approaches using archives, found objects and narratives.

== Education ==
Emre Hüner holds a BFA from the Accademia di Belli Arti di Brera, Milan, Italy (2004). He was a resident at the Rijksakademie van Beeldende Kunsten in Amsterdam in 2010–2011.

== Work ==
Hüner's first animated film "Panoptikon" (2005), "a two-dimensional, dystopic, post-Virilio vision" gathers archival objects, plants and architectural fragments drawn on paper and put into an anachronistic motion through repetitive industrial and scientific gestures, blurring the line between artefact and organism, and producing a "speculative narrative of disrupted episodes." The film was widely exhibited including the 10th Istanbul Biennial curated by Hou Hanru, Manifesta 7, Bolzano, Italy (2007), 6th Asia Pacific Triennial, Brisbane, Australia (2009) and Mori Art Museum, Tokyo, Japan (2019).

In 2013 Hüner presented a series of sculptures, drawings and films gathered under the title "AEOLIAN" at Rodeo Gallery and Nesrin Esirtgen Collection in Istanbul. These included the 16mm film "Diamond Head Diving Man" (2013), the installation "Anthropophagy" (2013) and the film "Aeolian Processes #2" (2012), produced during residencies in the Brazilian Amazon, including a visit to Fordlandia where he first started using ceramics "to imitate some organic forms" he encountered, "perfectly geometrical, fascinating and bizarre termite nests invading ruined industrial housing in the jungle". "Aeolian Processes #2" is a 16mm film documenting architectural models of Doris Duke's Shangri-La Villas in Hawaii and condensates Hüner's interest in scale models, utopian projects and decay. In a review of the exhibitions, Pelin Tan claims that "the experience of Hüner’s forms could be approached in the context of “new materialism” and his metaphorical spatial forms "as “arche–fossil”, a term coined by philosopher Quentin Meillassoux to describe materials that indicate not only "the traces of past life… but materials indicating the existence of an ancestral reality or event”. Iterations of "Aeolian Processes" were subsequently exhibited at Center for Contemporary Arts Kitakyushu, Japan (2013) and sspatz, Karlsruhe, Germany (2018).

2015 saw the premiere of Huner's film "Neochronophiq" (2015) at the 14th Istanbul Biennial curated by Carolyn Christov-Bakargiev. The three-channel film was co-produced by Mathaf: Arab Museum of Modern Art, SAHA Association and Platform 0090 and was shot mainly around Mesopotamia, including the archeological site of Gobekli Tepe, interspersed with close-up views of Hüner's ceramic sculptures shot in natural environments and man-made closed architectures and actor Tomas Lemarquis' performative gestures. The sculptures were exhibited alongside the film which gives center stage to "artefacts and rituals, architectural entities, unidentifiable topographies and the materiality of geological temporality" to "play the lead roles". "Neochronophobiq" was subsequently shown in solo presentations at STUK Leuven, Belgium (2016), Protocinema New York, USA (2017) and Kunsthalle Darmstadt, Germany (2017).

== Selected exhibitions ==
Emre Hüner's solo exhibitions include:

- Iconoclastic Nuclear Plastic, Rodeo Pireaus, Greece (2023)
- [ELEKTROİZOLASYON]: Unknown Parameter Extro-Record, Arter, Istanbul (2021)
- A Model Is Not A Map A House Is Not A Home, Artpace, San Antonio, Texas (2019)
- Hypabyssal, Salsa Seis, Marso, Mexico City (2016)
- Floating Cabin Rider Capsule Reactor Cycle, CCA Kitakyushu (2015)
- MAM Project 019, Mori Museum of Art, Tokyo, Japan (2013)
- salt 6, Utah Museum of Fine Arts, Salt Lake City, USA (2012)
- Adverse Stability, Extra City, Antwerp, Belgium (2010)

His work has been shown in institutional group exhibitions such as:

- CMD P for 2079, Frans Masereel Centrum, Kasterlee, Belgium (2020)
- The Revolution Is Us, 2nd Autostrada Biennale, Prishtina, Kosovo (2019)
- Further Thoughts on Earthy Materials, Kunsthaus Hamburg, Germany (2018)
- Let's Talk About The Weather: Art and Ecology in a Time of Crisis, Guangdong Times Museum, Guangzhou, China (2018)
- Planet 9, Kunsthalle Darmstadt, 2017, Germany
- Every Inclusion is an Exclusion of Other Possibilities, SALT, Istanbul, Turkey (2015)
- Approximately Infinite Universe, Museum of Contemporary Art San Diego, USA (2013)
- Manifesta 9 European Biennial of Contemporary Art, Genk, Belgium (2011)
- Paradise Lost, Istanbul Modern, Istanbul, Turkey (2010)
- The Future of Tradition, Haus der Kunst, Munich, Germany (2010)
- Summertime; or Close-Ups of Places We've (Never) Been, San Francisco Art Institute, USA, curated by Hou Hanru (2009)
- The Generational: Younger Than Jesus, New Museum, New York, USA (2009) curated by Laura Cornell, Massimiliano Gioni, Laura Hoptman
- NéoFutur. Pour des nouveaux imaginaires, Les Abattoirs, Toulouse, France (2008)
- The Rest Is Now, Manifesta 7 European Biennial of Contemporary Art, Bolzano, Italy, curated by Raqs Media Collective (2008)
