= Autostrada Biennale =

Art exhibition in Prizren, Kosovo

- Logo

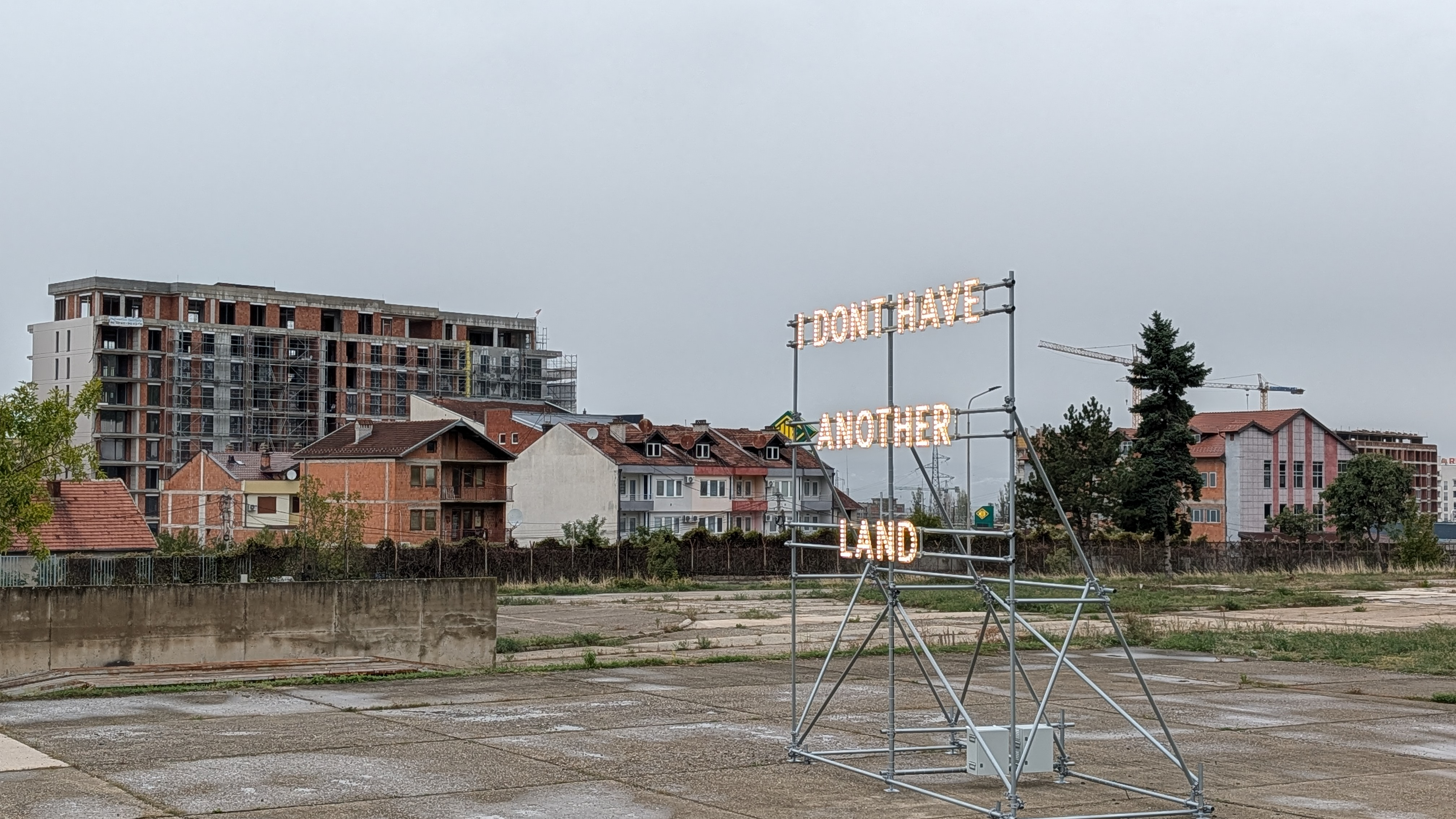
- I don't have another land by Nathan Coley (Autostrada Biennale 2025)
- Genre: Contemporary art
- Frequency: Biannually
- Location: Prizren
- Coordinates: 42°13′23″N 20°45′6″E
- Country: Kosovo
- Years active: 2017–present
- Inaugurated: 2017
- Founders: Vatra Abrashi, Leutrim Fishekqiu, Bariş Karamuç
- Most recent: 2025
- Website: autostradabiennale.org

The Autostrada Biennale is an international cultural exhibition hosted biennially in Prizren, Kosovo. The first edition was held in 2017, with subsequent editions in 2019, 2021, 2023 and 2025. The first Kosovar to curate an edition was Erzen Shkololli in 2025. Artists who have featured across the editions include Libia Castro & Olafur Olafsson, Nathan Coley, Agnes Denes, Alban Muja, and others. The 2023 exhibition was recognised as one of the "ten best exhibitions in Europe" by FRIEZE magazine. In March 2025 the biennale signed a formal agreement with the Regional Center for Cultural Heritage to support the revitalisation and internationalisation of Prizren's cultural heritage.

== Background ==
Founded by Vatra Abrashi, Leutrim Fishekqiu and Bariş Karamuç, the biennale has its origins in Prizren in 2014, when recognition of the need for greater cultural exchange in the region was made. The name "Autostrada" was chosen a commentary on the fact that Prizren lies between the existing biennales of Venice and Istanbul.

The first edition debuted in 2017 in Prizren, building on the success of the city's documentary festival. Key artists in this first edition were Valentina Bonizzi, Chang Chien-Chi, Libia Castro & Olafur Olafsson, Rena Rädle & Vladan Jeremic, Yang Shun-Fa and Alketa Xhafa. As part of the biennale, rooms in private homes across the city were converted into temporary gallery spaces. The 2021 edition focussed on the impact of the COVID-19 pandemic on society. It was also the first to extend beyond Prizren, to locations in Peja and Pristina.

In 2023 the former NATO base of KFOR in Prizen, which was a base of the Kosovo Peacekeeping Force, was added to the biennale's exhibition spaces. By 2025, this had developed to Hangar I, Hangar II, the Open Theatre and Artist Residency Space. The fifth edition in 2025 increased its programming from two months to three. It was also the first edition to be curated by a Kosovar, Erzen Shkololli (sq). The 2025 installation Circulations by Tamara Grčić (de) used glass bottles to comment upon climate and sustainability, by recreating ocean currents. Other key works included I don't have another land by Nathan Coley and I wish for your wish by Rivane Neuenschwander.

== Editions ==
Edition	Year	Curator	Concept	Cities
#1	2017	Manray Hsu	The Future of Borders	Prizren
#2	2019	Giacinto Di Pietrantonio	The Revolution Is Us	Prizren
#3	2021	Övül O. Durmuşoğlu & Joanna Warsza	What if a Journey ...	Prizren, Prishtina, Peja
#4	2023	Övül O. Durmuşoğlu & Joanna Warsza	All Images Will Disappear One Day	Prizren, Prishtina, Mitrovica
#5	2025	Erzen Shkololli	Unfolding Currents: The Pulse of Time	Prizren

== Reception and legacy ==
The 2023 exhibition was recognised as one of the "ten best exhibitions in Europe" by FRIEZE magazine. Key installations in the edition were Who speaks from the dust, who sees from the valley by Hera Büyüktaşcıyanc and Sunflower Fields by Agnes Denes. In particular Büyüktaşcıyanc's work took inspiration from folklore about waterways in Pristina and was presented at a former brickworks. Denes' work planted two circles of sunflowers in Pristina and Prizren. Following the sun, the flowers were situated "in the middle of cities struggling with pollution and gentrification". Another highlight was the recreation of the large-scale sculpture Equality, Work, Knowledge by Alban Muja in Mitrovica; the new work was entitle Monument in motion – going back, 2021–23. However this fourth edition has also been critiqued, with the choice of works by the duo Rena Rädle & Vladan Jeremic as not fully engaging with the complexities of a conflict-ridden area and muddling "the epistemological stance" of the curation.

In March 2025 the biennale signed a formal agreement with the Regional Center for Cultural Heritage to support the revitalisation of heritage in Prizren. This memorandum had the additional aim of internationalising Prizren's cultural heritage. This led to the renovation of Shani Efendi House in Prizren, which included a new exhibition space for contemporary art. The project was undertaken by Walter Kräutler, an architect from Vienna. The cultural partnership also led to the revitalisation of the Shemsedin Ahmet Bey hamam, which hosted work during the biennale by Vadim Fishkin.

== Gallery ==
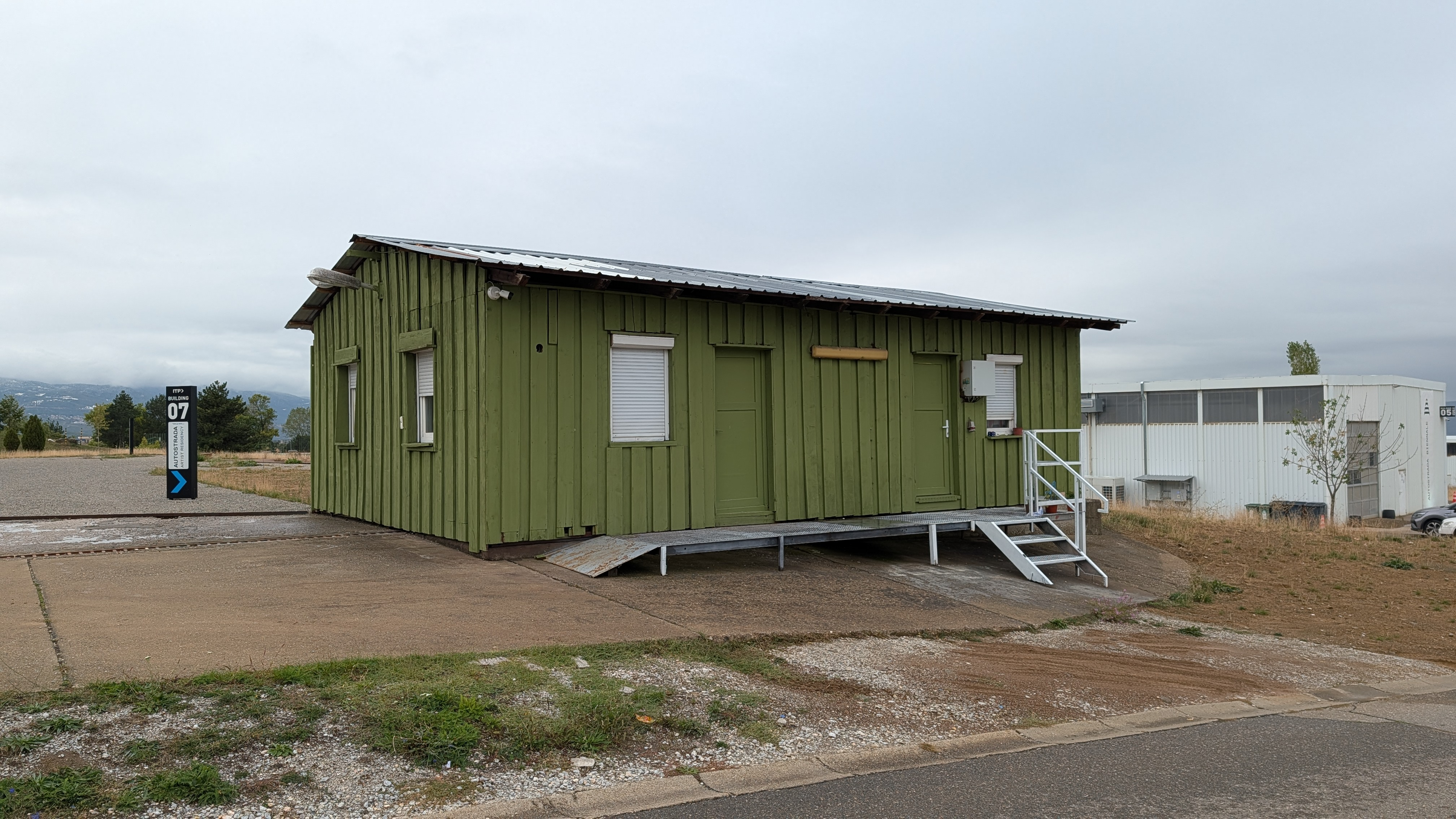
Artist's Residency building

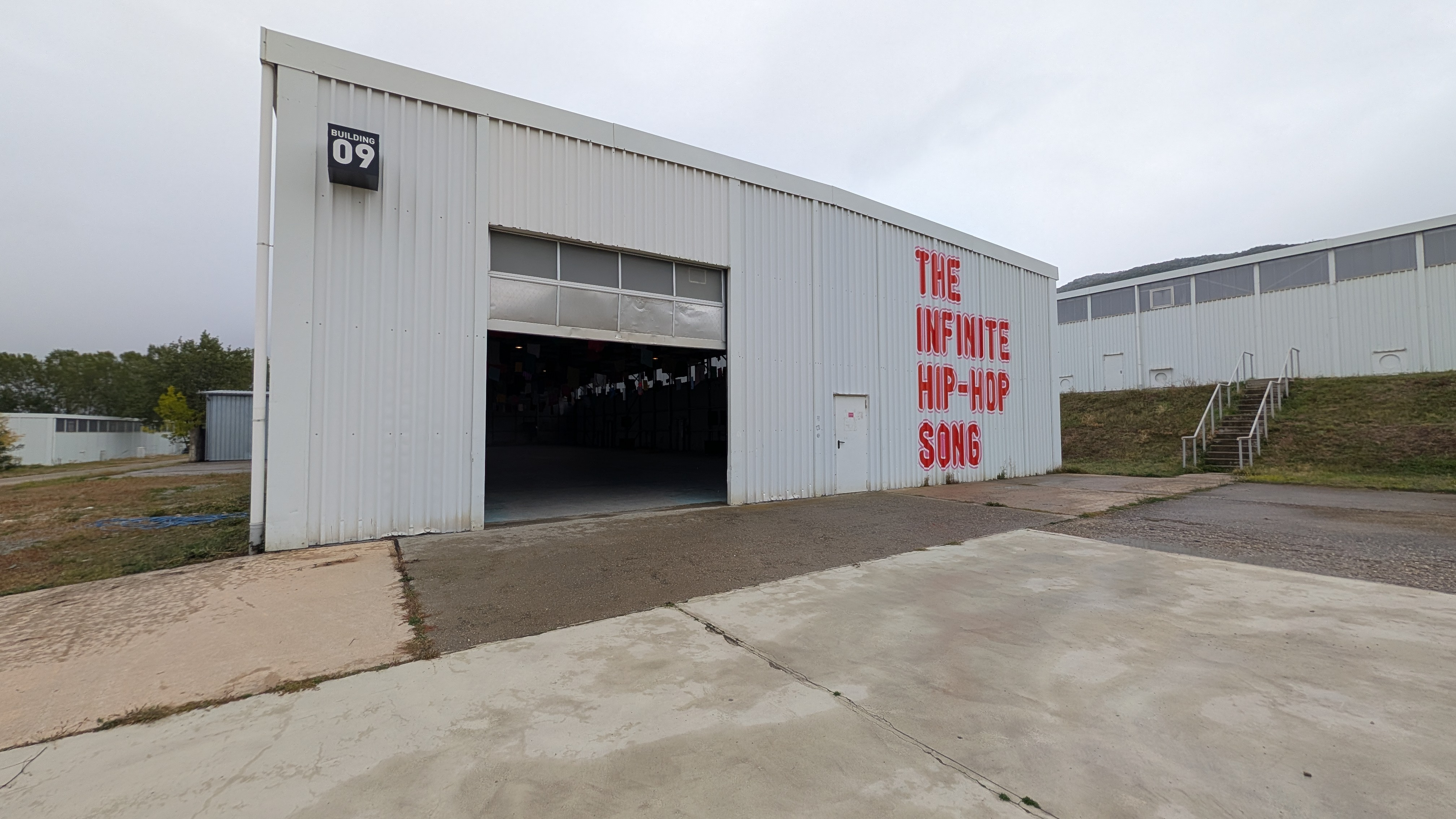
Hangar 9 in 2025 hosting The Infinite Hip-Hop Song

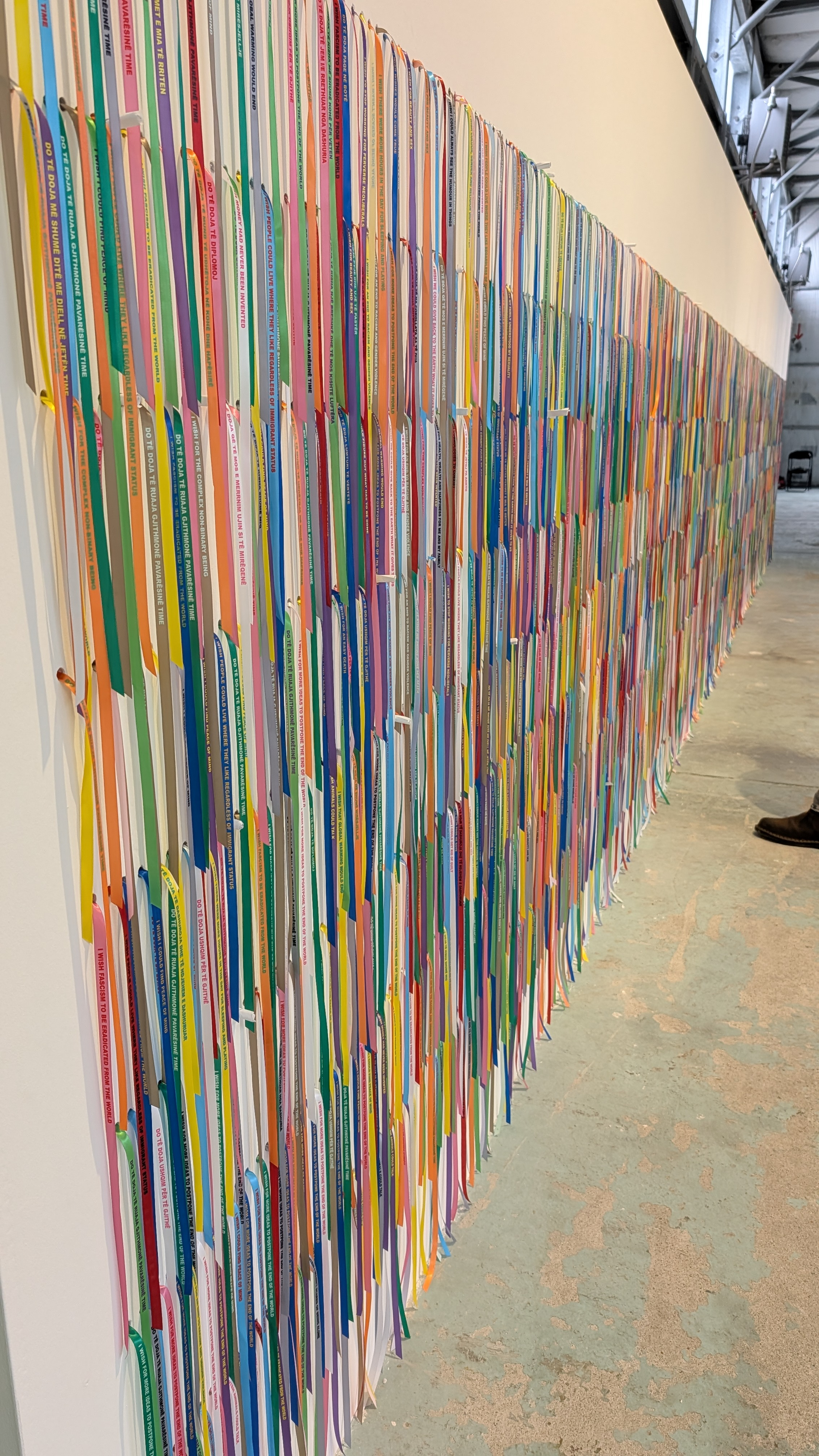
I wish for your wish - Rivane Neuenschwander (2025)

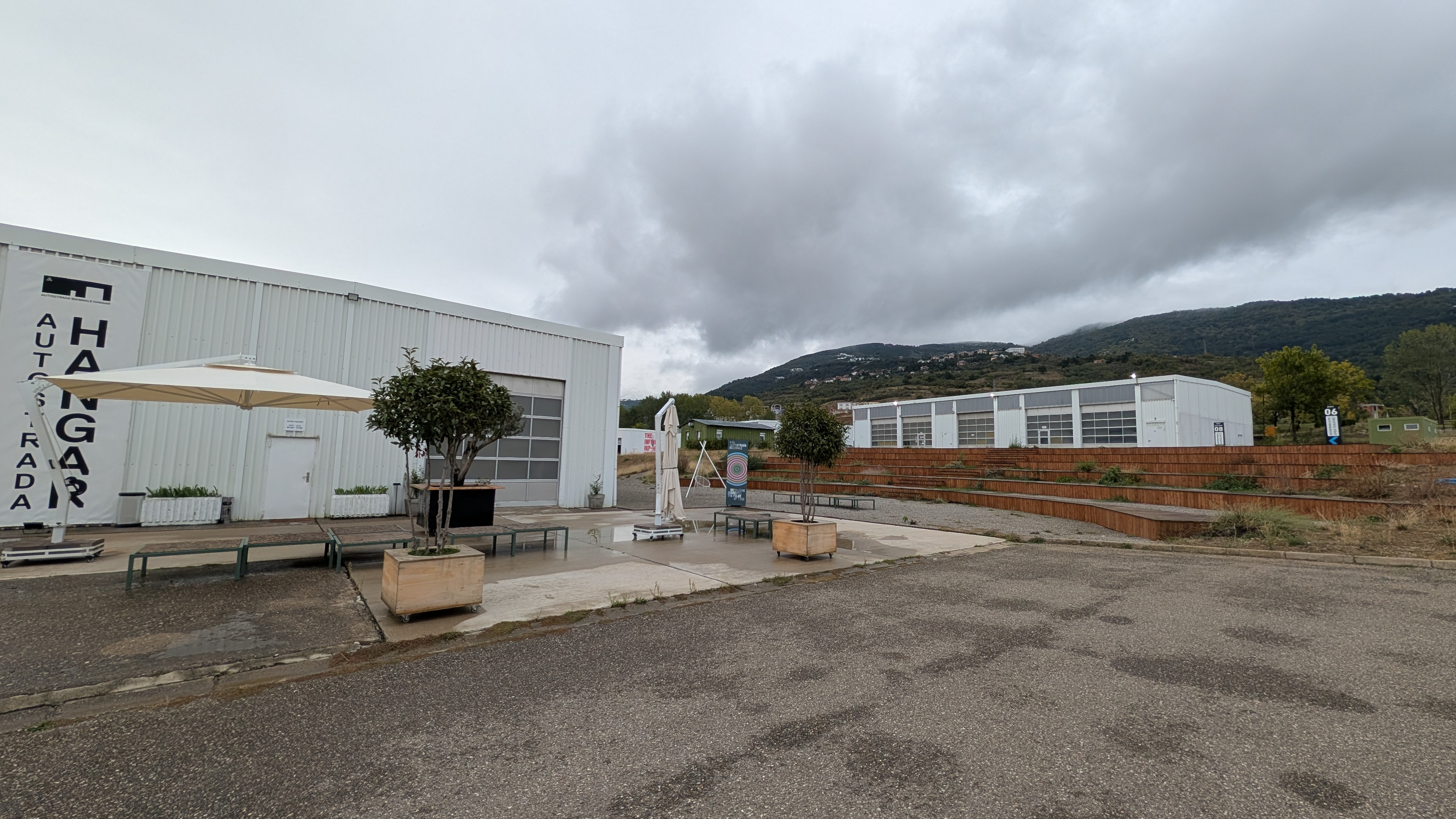
Autostrada Hangar – Center for Contemporary Art
