= Sherry Millner =

American artist

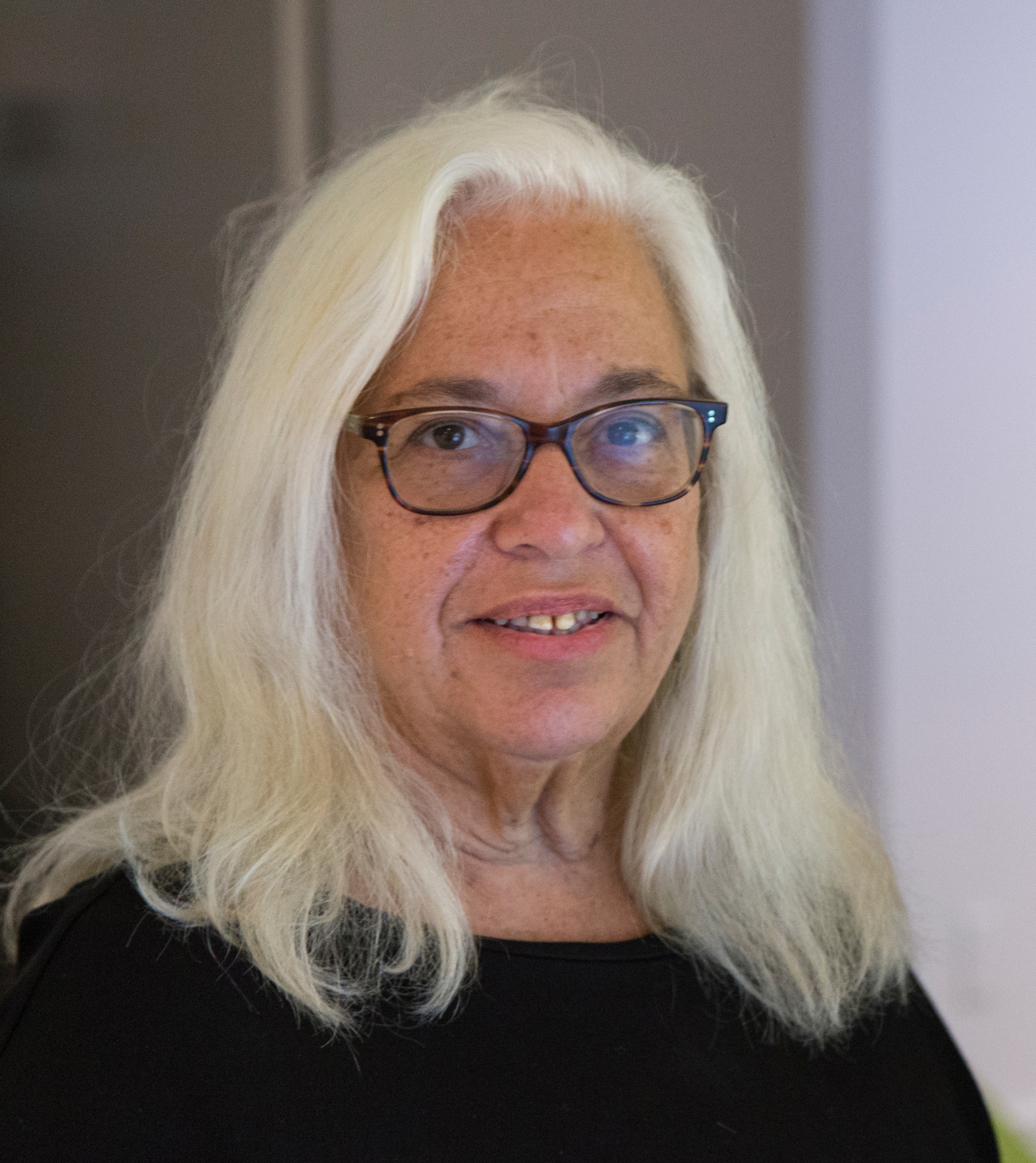
- Sherry Millner talking about her work at the New York Arts Practicum, 2013.
- Born: Brooklyn, New York City
- Known for: Video; Photography; Installation art; Curation

Sherry Millner (born in Brooklyn, New York) is an American artist working primarily in video. She has also worked in photography and installation art.

== Career ==
Millner has been producing films, videos, and photomontages since the mid-1970s. In the 1980s she was part of the first generation of feminist video artists, along with Vanalyne Green and Cecelia Condit. Her work explores motherhood, the family, and its relationship to the militarized State, using a combination of satirical humor, analysis, and personal insight. She often collaborates on videos with her partner, the novelist and media critic Ernest Larsen.

Millner's work has been included in numerous exhibitions at venues such as the Whitney Museum of American Art (including two consecutive Whitney Biennial exhibitions), The Museum of Modern Art, and the Institute of Contemporary Art. In 2011, her work was included with that of Superflex, Libia Castro, Ólafur Ólafsson and others in an international exhibition curated by Oliver Ressler and Gregory Sholette, It's the Political Economy, Stupid: The Global Financial Crisis in Art and Theory. The exhibition travelled to venues in New York, Chicago, Vienna, Greece, Finland, Serbia, and Croatia. In 2013, her work was included with that of Jeremy Deller, Mike Figgis and others in Economy, an exhibition which travelled to the Stills Gallery in Edinburgh and the Centre for Contemporary Arts in Glasgow.

Her photomontages have been reproduced in many journals and anthologies; she was represented along with Barbara Kruger, Susan Meiselas, Carrie Mae Weems, and others in Diane Neumaier's anthology, Reframings: New American Feminist Photographies (Temple University Press, 1995). She has received grants and fellowships from the New York Foundation for the Arts, the Jerome Foundation, the NYSCA, Long Beach Museum of Art, and the Ucross Foundation, among others. Her work has been widely reviewed and referenced by critics and art historians in books, journals, and periodicals.

Millner has taught media courses at College of Staten Island, City University of New York, the New York Arts Practicum, and elsewhere. In recent years she has focused on curation. In January 2016, she and Larsen released the first of a three-disc DVD set that forms a curated history of the films of political resistance: Disruptive Film: Everyday Resistance to Power, Vol. 1. This was based on their work as curators of the "Border-Crossers and Trouble-Makers" program at the Oberhausen Film Festival in 2008. They also programmed the 2013 Robert Flaherty Film Seminar.

== Filmography ==
Millner's work is distributed by Video Data Bank.

Year	Film	Length	Type	
1983	Womb with a View	00:40:00	Color	
1985	Scenes From the Microwar	00:23:30	Color, Stereo	with Ernest Larsen
1986	Out of the Mouths of Babes	00:24:00	Color	
1992	The Art of Protective Coloration	00:16:00	Color, Stereo	with Ernest Larsen
1996	Unruly Fan/Unruly Star	00:16:10	Color, Stereo	
2000	41 Shots	00:14:00	Color, Mono	with Ernest Larsen

== Selected exhibitions ==
- 1987: CalArts: Skeptical Belief(s), Renaissance Society, Chicago
- 1987: Biennial Exhibition, Whitney Museum of American Art, New York
- 1988: Investigations 27: Fast Forward, New Video, Institute of Contemporary Art, Philadelphia
- 1989: Biennial Exhibition, Whitney Museum of American Art, New York
- 1989: Sherry Millner Retrospective at The Kitchen, New York
- 1989: Literacy on the Table: Cultural Fluency and the Act of Reading, Hallwalls Contemporary Arts Center, Buffalo
- 1989: Social Engagement: Women's Video in the 80's (New American Filmmakers Series), Whitney Museum of American Art, New York
- 1990: Image World, Whitney Museum of American Art, New York
- 1990: Video and Myth, The Museum of Modern Art, New York
- 1990: The Decade Show: Frameworks of Identity in the 1980s, New York, The New Museum
- 1992: Re-Mapping Cultures, Whitney Museum of American Art, New York
- 1993: Video Viewpoints, The Museum of Modern Art, New York
- 1998: New Documentary Film & Video, The Museum of Modern Art, New York
- 2011: It’s the Political Economy, Stupid: The Global Financial Crisis in Art and Theory, traveling exhibition
- 2013: Economy, Edinburgh, Glasgow

== Publications ==
- Millner, Sherry (1985). "Interview with Christine Choy". In Steven, Peter (ed.). Jump Cut: Hollywood, Politics, and Counter Cinema. Praeger. pp. 158–170. ISBN 9780030019647.
- Millner, Sherry (2000). "Wired for Violence". In Cutting Edge Women's Research Group (ed.). Digital Desires: Language, Identity and New Technologies. I.B. Tauris. pp. 61–77. ISBN 9781860645754.
- Millner, Sherry; Larsen, Ernest (2000). "Mapping the New New World". Art Journal. 59 (3). College Art Association: 54–58. doi:10.1080/00043249.2000.10792012. JSTOR 778027. S2CID 191580819.
- Millner, Sherry; Larsen, Ernest (2002). "41 Shots". Public Culture. 14 (2). Duke University Press: 305–310. doi:10.1215/08992363-14-2-305. S2CID 201767170.
