= Vasif Kortun =

Vasif Kortun (born November 6, 1958) is a curator, writer and educator in the field of contemporary art, its institutions, and exhibition practices. Kortun served as the founding director of several international institutions, including SALT, Platform Garanti Contemporary Art Center, Proje4L, and the Museum of the Center for Curatorial Studies, Bard College. In 2006, he received the Award for Curatorial Excellence from the Center for Curatorial Studies for his "experimental approach and openness to new ideas to challenge the contemporary art world and push its parameters beyond national or international, local or global developments." Kortun has written extensively on contemporary art and visual culture in Turkey for publications and periodicals internationally. He currently lives in Ayvalık, a seaside town on the northwestern Aegean coast of Turkey.

== Institutions ==
Kortun served as the Director of Research and Programs (2011–17) at SALT, a non-profit research institution located in Istanbul and Ankara. Under his direction, SALT has organized numerous exhibitions and public programs around visual and material culture, amassed a library of over 40,000 publications, and built an archive on art, architecture and social history of Turkey with over 1,500,000 digitized items available online. Writing about the inauguration of SALT in 2011, writer Kaelen Wilson-Goldie describes Kortun as "an unabashed power broker on the Istanbul scene." In her text, Wilson-Goldie defines SALT as "a think tank in action, a collaborative space for testing out new forms of debate and exchange."

Kortun resigned from his position at SALT in April 2017 and organized a public talk where he presented his paper "Questions on Institutions" (Kurum Soruları). He presented the English version of this talk in October 2017 at the Museum of Contemporary Art Toronto, as part of The Museum Is Not What It Used To Be series. In this talk, he says he was part of a team that conceived public programs for people who "are more intelligent than us, because we do not believe people are simple-minded." "When we begin a project, we exercise what we call 'state of unknowing'. . . the idea is to enter an agonistic sphere where difficult questions can be posed without being considered incriminating or hostile."

Following his resignation, he remains on SALT's board of directors.

Before instituting SALT, Kortun served as the Founding Director of Platform Garanti Contemporary Art Center, Istanbul (2001–10), a non-profit art organization that hosted exhibitions, conferences, an international residency program, and an archive of contemporary art in Turkey; Proje4L Istanbul Museum of Contemporary Art (2001–04), the first private contemporary art museum in Turkey; and the Museum of the Center for Curatorial Studies, Bard College, Annadale-on-Hudson (1993–97), the exhibition space that preceded the Hessel Museum of Art that currently hosts over 1,700 contemporary artworks.

== Exhibitions ==
Kortun describes the late-1980s exhibition/happening series Serotonin as a turning point for his practice. Conceived by Arhan Kayar et al., Serotonin I was organized at Feshane in 1989, and Serotonin II at Gashouse (Gazhane) in Istanbul in 1992. Kortun participated in the second edition of the series as an organizer and "for some as an artist." Kortun speaks about Feshane as an eye opener as it was a major site for Turkey's process of modernization: It was built as one of the most advanced textile factories in the late 19th century, to be abandoned in 1986 for environmental improvements. The exhibition and the related programs used the abandoned building as part of the exhibition.

Later, Kortun organized Memory/Recollection, a series that is considered to be the first contemporary art exhibition organized by an independent curator in Turkey. Memory/Recollection was organized in 1991 at Taksim Art Gallery (Taksim Sanat Galerisi), and Number Fifty/Memory/Recollection II (Elli Numara: Anı/Bellek II) was presented in 1993 in Akaretler, Istanbul, where "politics displaced art" as the participating artists and he decided to prematurely close the exhibition after the banner of the show was replaced with a Democrat Party poster.

He has undertaken numerous independent curatorial projects including most recently an exhibition of works by Cengiz Çekil (2010) at RAMPA, Istanbul—the first comprehensive presentation of Çekil's practice. He co-curated The Columns Held us Up (2009) with November Paynter at Artists Space, New York, where the exhibition was "framed much like a one-month artist residency" as Platform Garanti Contemporary Art Center had paused its programs to be incorporated into SALT.

Kortun curated numerous exhibitions in Turkey and internationally. He served as the chief curator of the 3rd International Istanbul Biennial (1992), co-curator of the 9th International Istanbul Biennial (with Charles Esche, 2005) and the 6th Taipei Biennial (with Manray Hsu, 2008), the 2nd Biennale of Ceramics in Contemporary Art, Albisola (2003); the 24th São Paulo Biennial, São Paulo (1998), among others. He also curated the Pavilion of Turkey at the 52nd Venice Biennale (2007) with a solo exhibition of artist Hüseyin Bahri Alptekin as well as the United Arab Emirates Pavilion at the 54th Venice Biennale (2011) with a group exhibition titled Second Time Around including artists Reem Al Ghaith, Abdullah Al Saadi, and Sheikha Lateefa bent Maktoum.

Kortun says he comes from a generation that "came to maturity through biennales," which were the "most promising agency that changed the art world as we knew it" in the 1980s and the 1990s. Writer Matthew Scum writes, "His experience corresponds to that of other seminal curators who began working on an international scales during the 1990s."

== Writings ==
Kortun contributed to several books, including Fresh Cream: Contemporary Art in Culture (Phaidon Press, 2000), Foci: Interviews with 10 International Curators (ApexArt Curatorial Program, 2001), How Latitudes Become Forms: Art in the Global Age (Walker Art Center, 2003), and Signs Taken in Wonder: Searching for Contemporary Art about Istanbul (Hatje Cantz, 2013). In 2004, he co-authored the book Jahresring 51: Szene Turkei: Abseits aber Tor with Erden Kosova, focusing on the art scene in Turkey. In 2013, he co-edited VOTI Union of the Imaginary: A Curators Forum with Susan Hapgood and November Paynter, exploring the online discussion platform for international curators in the late 1990s. His texts have been included in numerous exhibition catalogues, such as the 2nd Johannesburg Biennial (1997), the 24th São Paulo Biennial (1998), Manifesta 2 (1998), and The United Arab Emirates Pavilion at the 54th International Art Exhibition, Venice Biennale (2011), among others.

A selection of his writings from 1985 onwards is available online in Turkish, organized in three publications titled 10, Ofsayt Ama Gol!, and 20. These include his essays on Istanbul, exhibition-making, cultural policies, institution-building, and interviews with artists.

== Committees and Boards ==
Kortun is the chairman of the board of the Foundation for Arts Initiatives (2009–ongoing), a private foundation that support artists, curators, and arts initiatives since 1999. He served on the Tate Turner Prize Selection Committee in 2011.

In November 2015, Kortun, along with Van Abbemuseum Director Charles Esche and Mathaf: Arab Museum of Modern Art Director Abdullah Karroum, resigned from his position as board member from the International Committee for Museums of Modern Art (CIMAM). The resignation was the result of a controversy around artistic freedom of expression, which was related to the 2015 exhibition The Beast and the Sovereign at MACBA whose then director Bartomeu Marí also served as the CIMAM President. "We believe that art museums engaged with contemporary issues should be sites for the free exchange of ideas, where legal debate about and dissension from government policy or majority social opinion are allowed and encouraged," their joint statement read. "The recent course of events at MACBA and within the board at CIMAM have led us to doubt whether our current president can defend those values credibly."
