= Pierre Bismuth =

French artist and filmmaker (born 1963)

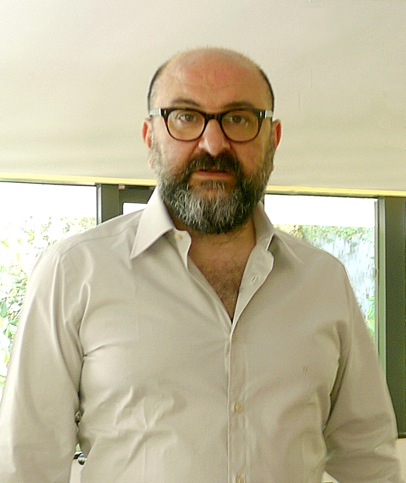
- Pierre Bismuth
- Born: 6 June 1963 (age 63); Neuilly-sur-Seine, France
- Education: École nationale supérieure des arts décoratifs, Paris
- Known for: Contemporary Art
- Movement: Appropriation art, Installation art

Pierre Bismuth (6 June 1963) is a French artist and filmmaker. His practice can be placed in the tradition of conceptual art and appropriation art. His work uses a variety of media and materials, including painting, sculpture, collage, video, architecture, performance, music, and film. He is best known for being among the authors of the story for Eternal Sunshine of the Spotless Mind (2004), for which he won the Academy Award for Best Original Screenplay alongside Michel Gondry and Charlie Kaufman. Bismuth made his directorial debut with the 2016 feature film Where is Rocky II?.

== Early life ==
Pierre Bismuth was originally a visual communication student at les Arts Décoratifs. He met François Miehe there, one of his teachers, with whom he subsequently collaborated on several projects. In the 1980s Pierre Bismuth moved to Berlin where he attended Georg Baselitz's class of the Hochschule der Kunst. When he returned to France, he settled in Paris where he shared a studio with Xavier Veilhan and Pierre Huyghe. At the beginning of the 1990s, he settled in Brussels where he gave the opening show of Jan Mot's new gallery on the rue Dansaert. In 2000, he moved to London, prompted by the Lisson Gallery, where he has had several exhibitions since then.

In 2005, after having settled in Brussels again, he was awarded, along with director Michel Gondry and screenwriter Charlie Kaufman, an Academy Award for Best Original Screenplay for the film Eternal Sunshine of the Spotless Mind (2004), which many critics consider one of the best films of the 2000s.

Since then, his work has continued to be shown all over Europe and America.

== Work ==
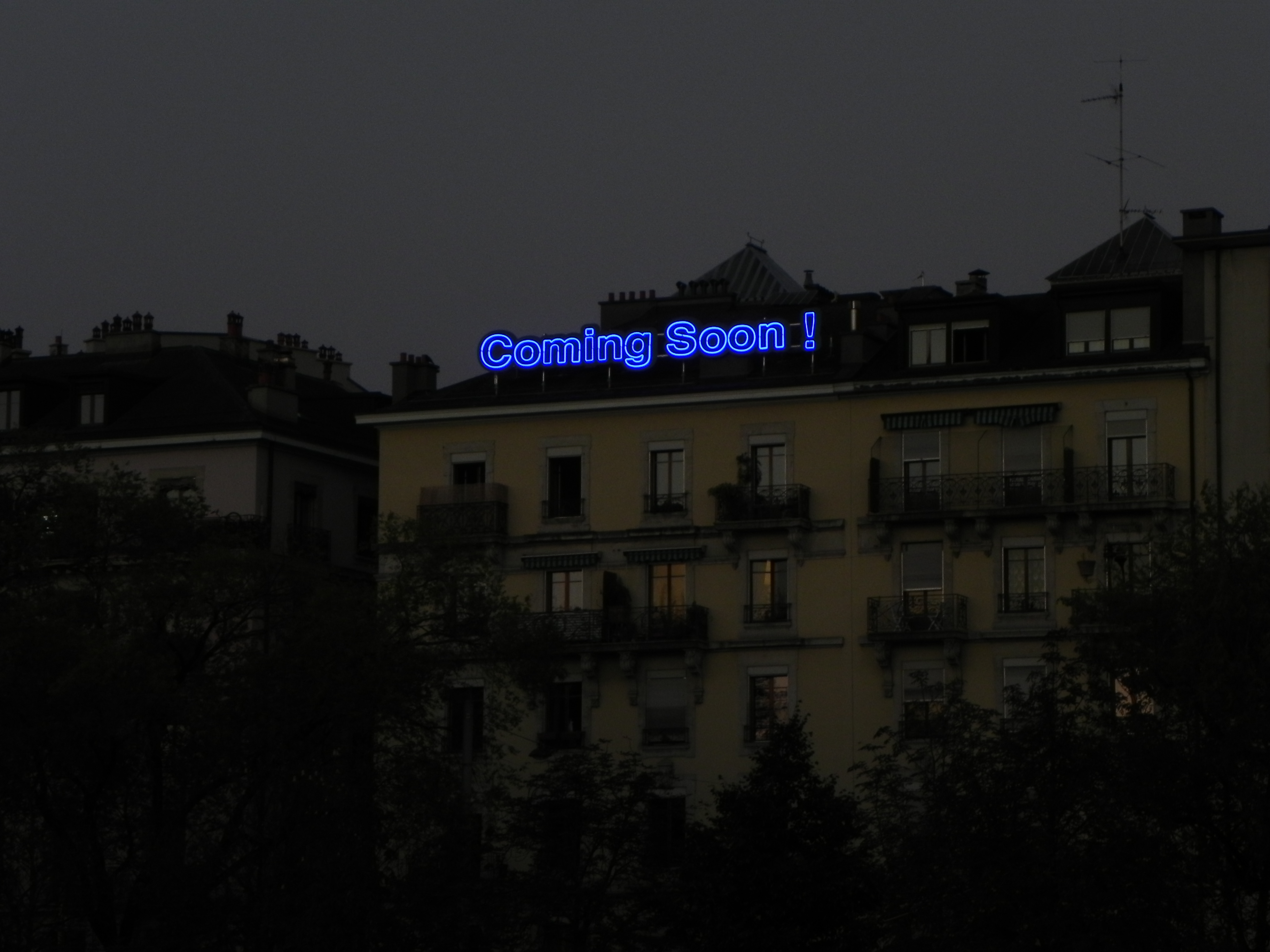
Coming Soon, Pierre Bismuth, 2012 permanent installation for Neon Parallax, Geneva

Through efficient and often humorous gestures, Bismuth interrupts pre-established codes of reading the images and objects that pervade daily life, from headline stories in newspapers to magazine clippings from gentlemen's magazines, to even the color of the walls. In his series From Red to Nothing and From Green to Something Else, Bismuth reproduces a painted wall in each exhibition, subtly altering the color by the addition of a small amount of white or colored paint to the original color. Another series Something less, Something More (2002–2006) consists of thin partitions out of which Bismuth removes circles until as little material as possible remained, while the circles removed from the partitions accumulate on the floor.

In Replaced by the Same (2003), Bismuth plays on the idea of substituting one thing by its double: for each photograph in this series, elements taken from duplicates are glued on exactly the same place as they were on the originals.

Bismuth often plays with the film industry imagery, as in his Jungle Book Project where he uses the different translations of the famous Disney film to create a new Babel like environnement. He is also known for following the movement of actors and actresses hands during a full movie and reproducing these as drawings. Moreover, the re-use of the famous words "The End" or "Coming Soon" featured in movies or trailers is also a recurrent work. "Coming Soon" is featured as a permanent public luminous art work in Geneva.

=== Collaborations ===
A striking aspect of Bismuth's artistic practice consists in his collaborations with other artists from the most various fields. He notably collaborated with Michel Gondry, Jerome Bel, Jonathan Monk, Dessislava Dimova, Diego Perone, Barbara Visser, Angus Fairhurst, Cory Arcangel, Cyprien Gaillard, Mathias Faldbakken or Joe Strummer.

== Exhibitions (selection) ==
Solo shows
- 2011

In Advance of Unpredictable Usage Conditions, D&A-Lab, Brussels

Cory Arcangel vs. Pierre Bismuth, Team Gallery, New York (with Cory Arcangel)

An Ocean of Lemonade – or the Trouble with Living in Times of Fulfilled Utopias, Smart Project Space, Amsterdam

- 2010

Le versant de l’Analyse, Jan Mot, Brussels

La galerie est heureuse de vous inviter à la nouvelle exposition de Pierre Bismuth, Bugada & Cargnel, Paris

Le psy, l'artiste et le cuisinier, Nuit Blanche, Musée d'art et d'histoire du judaïsme, Paris

Flip Side of the Same, Art Unlimited Basel, Team Gallery, New York

Pierre Bismuth, Fremantle Art Center, Perth

- 2009

Objects That Should Have Changed Your Life, Base Progetti per l'Arte, Florence

Pierre Bismuth, Following the Right Hand Of..., Team Gallery, New York

Neon, Mirror and Gold, Galleria Sonia Rosso, Turin

- 2008

Ruled by Extravagant Expectations, Galerie Christine König, Wien

The All Seeing Eye (The Hardcore Techno Version), British Film Institute, London

The Beauty and the Beast, Galerie Christine König, Wien

Coming Soon, Queensland Art Gallery, Gallery of Modern Art, Brisbane

- 2007

Coming Soon, Bugada & Cargnel, Paris

One Man's Mess is Another Man Masterpiece, Jan Mot, Brussels

One Size Fits All, Mary Boone Gallery, Uptown New York

One Size Fits All, Mary Boone Gallery, Chelsea New York

One Size Fits All, Team Gallery, New York

- 2006

Siamo sulla Buona Strada, Villa Arson, Nice (curated by Thierry Davila)

Coming Soon, Santa Monica Museum of Art, Santa Monica

Most Wanted Men, Erna Hecey, Brussels

Most Wanted Men, Jan Mot, Brussels

- 2005

Pierre Bismuth – Pantone 192 e altri colori, Galleria Sonia Rosso, Turin

The All Seeing Eye, Bugada & Cargnel, Paris (with Michel Gondry)

Tout ce qui n'est pas interdit est obligatoire, Kunstmuseum Thun, Thun

In the framework of the Nuit Blanche Festival, Galerie SAS, Montreal

Points de vue, Ville de Nancy, Nancy

Following the Right Hand of Kim Novak in – Kiss Me Stupid, Art Unlimited Basel, Lisson Gallery, London

- 2004

Something Less Something More, Galerie Christine König, Wien

Something Less, Something More – Le Trous de Bale, Art Unlimited Basel, Jan Mot, Brussels

Nel nome del padre (Works After Daniel Buren), Galleria Sonia Rosso, Turin

- 2003

Presque identique, très légèrement différent, Bugada & Cargnel, Paris

Collages fit for General Audiences, Lisson Gallery, London

Pierre Bismuth, Art gallery of York University, Toronto

I Agree - the Idea of Cloning Humans is Disgusting, Jan Mot, Brussels

Arte per tutti, ma capita solo da te, Galleria Sonia Rosso, Torino

- 2002

Quelque chose en moins, quelque chose en plus, Erna Hecey gallery, Luxembourg

The Party, Sprengel Museum Hannover, Hannover

- 2001

Alternance, Kunsthalle Basel, Basel

Our Trip Out West, CAC, Vilnius, Lithuania (in association with Jonathan Monk)

Pierre Bismuth, Centre d'Art Contemporain de Brétigny, Brétigny

Pierre Bismuth, Dvir Gallery, Tel Aviv

Closed, Diana Stigter Gallery, Amsterdam

- 2000

Collages, Mot & Van Den Boogaard, Brussels

- 1999

Alternances d'éclaircies et de passages nuageux l'après-midi, Galerie Yvon Lambert, Paris

Quelques comédiens au milieu de quelques acteurs, MAMCO, Musée d'Art Moderne et Contemporain, Geneva

Pierre Bismuth, MK2 Project-Café, Paris

- 1998

The Party, The Showroom, London

Galerie Mot & Van den Boogaard, Brussels

- 1997

Box, Palais des Beaux-Arts, Brussels

Plus Min, Renesse,

Pierre Bismuth, Witte de With, Rotterdam

Kunsthalle, Wien

Arborétum, projet public pour la DRAC d'Orléans

Listening Me Watching Them/Humming/Synonymes, Yvon Lambert Gallery, Paris

- 1996

Most Wanted Men, Mot & Van den Boogaard, Brussels

Le bruit du son, Lisson Gallery, London

The Blind Film, Tramway, Glasgow

- 1995

Pierre Bismuth, CCC Centre de Création Contemporaine, Tours

Pierre Bismuth, FRAC Languedoc Roussillon, Montpellier

- 1992

La Piéce de Chateauroux, Marcel Duchamp, Châteauroux

Pierre Bismuth, One Five Gallery, Antwerp

Group Shows
- 2011

Une terrible beauté est née, 11e Biennale de Lyon, Lyon

Fluiten in het donker, De Appel, Amsterdam

The End Of Money, Witte de With, Rotterdam

Bild für Bild – Film und zeitgenossische Kunst, aus der Sammlung des Centre Georges Pompidou, Museum am Ostwall, Dortmund

Lonely at the top: Graphology, Chapter I, M HKA, Antwerp

- 2010

Prospective XXIe siècle, FRAC Ile-de-France, Le Plateau, Paris

De leur temps 3, 10 ans de création en France/le prix Marcel Duchamp, Musée d’Art Moderne et Contemporain de Strasbourg, Strasbourg

The Last Newspaper, New Museum, New York (curated by Richard Flood and Benjamin Godsill)

ABC Art Belge Contemporain, Studio National des Arts Contemporain Le Fresnoy, Tourcoing (curated by Dominique Païni)

Exhibition, exhibition / Mostra, Castello di Rivoli, Turin (curated by Adam Carr)

Repetition Island, Centre Georges Pompidou, Paris (curated by Raimundas Malasauskas)

Chefs d'oeuvre, Centre Pompidou Metz, Metz

Seconde main, ARC, Musée d'Art Moderne de la Ville de Paris, Paris

FAX, Para/Site Art Space, Hong Kong

DOUBLE BIND / Arrêtez d’essayer de mo comprendre !, Villa Arson, Nice

- 2009

GAGARIN The Artists in their Own Words, SMAK, Gent

Editions Vs Objects, CECCH – Centre d’édition contemporaine, Genève

Mille e tre, Le Louvre, Paris (curated by Marie-Laure Bernadac)

White Noise III, Pandora's Sound Box, White Box, New York (curated by Lara Pan)

Mise à l'échelle, Regard sur la collection d'art contemporain au Grand-Hornu, MAC's, Grand-Hornu

IV Bienal de Jafre, Bienal de Jafre, Jafre

Richard Prince and the revolution, Projectesd, Barcelona

Jonathan Monk on Richard Prince, Projecte SD, Barcelona

Following the Right Hand of - Sigmund Freud, Art Basel Film, Basel

Höhenrausch – Art on the Rooftops of Linz, OK Center for Contemporary Art, Linz

V.O.S.T. OV/OT, iMal, Bruxelles

Talk Show, Institute of Contemporary Arts, London

FAX, Drawing Center, New York

Lille 3000, Liquid Frontiers, Tri Postal, Lille

- 2008

The All-Seeing Eye (The Hardcore-Techno Version), British Film Institute, Southbank Gallery, London

No Leftover, Kunsthalle Bern, Bern

Anna Kournikova Deleted By Memeright Trusted System, HHMKV, Hartware MedienKunstVerein, Dortmund

One of These Things Is Not Like the Other Things, Uno su Nove Art contemporanea, Roma

Yours, Mine Ours, Appropriation in Contemporary Art, University of Essex Gallery, Colchester

Beneath the Surface, Nils Staerk Contemporary Art, Copenhague

Collateral II, SESC, Avenida Paulista, São Paulo

- 2007

......... Without........., Yvon Lambert gallery, Paris (curated by Adam Carr)

ReadyMedia, Museum of Contemporary Art Belgrade, Belgrade

Group show, Dvir Gallery, Tel Aviv

Shallow – Pierre Bismuth, Stefan Brügemann, Martin Creed, Miltos Manetas and Malcolm McLaren, I-20, New York (curated by Stefan Brügemann)

…And Dreams are Dreams, Istanbul Museum of Modern Art, Istanbul

ISCP Open Studios, ISCP, New York

Following the Right Hand of Britney Spears in – Toxic (1 min, 2 min, 3 min), Sadler's Wells, London

Airs de Paris, Centre Georges Pompidou, Paris (curated by Christine Macel and Daniel Birnbaum)

L'emprise du lieu, Domaine Pommery, Reims (curated by Daniel Buren)

Vilnius is Burning, Fondazione Sandretto Re Rebaudengo, Turin

Re-trait, Fondation d'entreprise RicardlFondation Ricard, Paris (curated by Claire Staebler)

Ready Media, Nederlands Instituut voor Mediakunst, Amsterdam

Entre fronteras, MARCO, Museo de Arte Contemporanea de Vigo, Vigo

- 2006

Sudden Impact, nouvelles acquisitions, Le Plateau, Paris

Being in Brussels, Argos, Bruxelles

Le mouvement des images, présentation thématique des collections du Musée National d'Art Moderne (nouvel accrochage), Centre Georges Pompidou, Paris (curated by Philippe-Alain Michaud)

Peintures/Malerei, Martin Gropius Bau, Berlin (curated by Laurent Le Bon)

Figures de l'acteur, Le paradoxe du comédien, Collection Lambert, Avignon

People. Volti, corpi e segni contemporanei dalla collezione di Ernesto Esposito, MADRE – Museo d'arte Donna Regina, Naples (curated by Edoardo Cicelyn et Mario Codognato)

La force de l'art, Galeries nationales du Grand Palais (Paris)lGrand Palais, Paris

Somewhere Else, M HKA, Antwerp

I Love My Scene: Scene 3, Mary Boone Gallery, New York

Message personnel, Yvon Lambert gallery, Paris

Curating the Campus, deSingel, Antwerp

Play Station, Sprengel Museum Hannover, Hannover

The Satellite of Love, Witte de With Museum and Tent, Rotterdam

- 2005

VideoDictionnary, La Casa Encendida, Madrid

Mouvement des deux côtés du Rhin, Ludwig Museum, Köln

Shortcuts, Between Reality and Fiction: Video, Installations and Painting from le Fonds National d'Art Contemporain, Bass Museum of Art, Miami

Loud & Clear TOO, Ludwig Museum, Budapest

Post Notes, Institute of Contemporary Arts, London

Just do it! The Subversion of Signs from Marcel Duchamp to Prada Meinhof, Lentos Art Museum Linz

Group Show, Galerie Roger Pailhas, Marseille

- 2004

Animaux - Des animaux et des hommes, Seedamm Kulturzentrum, Pfaffikon

Diffusion per Vidéo, ZKM, Karlsruhe

This is not a hom this is a house, L’observatoire Maison grégoire, Bruxelles

Duo Track, language and image in audiovisual art from Flanders ans the Netherlands, Argos, Bruxelles

Collage, Bloomberg Space, London

Soziale Kreaturen, How Bodies Become Art, Sprengel Museum Hannover, Hannover

A-Side Film Festival, Side Cinema, Newcastle

Loud & Clear, Institut Néerlandais, Paris

Mute!, Guild & Greyshkul, New York

Paisages Mediatics, Fundacio "La Caixa" Blondel, Lleida

- 2003

Loud & Clear, Stedelijk Museum, Amsterdam

Images of Society, Kunstmuseum Thun, Thun

(visa para), Contemporary Art Center Vilnius, Vilnius

Loud & Clear, Roseum Universal Studio, Malmo

Mouvements de fonds, Acquisitions 2002 du Fonds National d'Art Contemporain, MAC Marseille

Falsa Inocencia, Miró Foundation, Barcelone

Copyright Europe Exists, MMCH, Thessalonike

Plunder, Dundee Contemporary Arts Exhibitions, Dundee

The Real McCOY, Institut Français, Istanbul

- 2002

The Larsen Effect, Casino Luxembourg, Forum d'Art Contemporain, Luxembourg

Basics, Kunsthalle Bern, Bern

Manifesta 4, European Biennial of Contemporary Art, Frankfurt

There Is A Light That Never Goes Out, Villa Galvani, Pordenone

Sans commune mesure. Image et texte dans l'art actuel, Studio National des Arts Contemporain Le Fresnoy, Tourcoing

Video-Zone, 1st Bienale of video Art, Tel Aviv

Invitation, Museum für Moderne Kunst, Frankfurt am Main

- 2001

Exposition itinérante, Centre d'Art Contemporain de Vilnius, Vilnius

Rooseum-Malmö, Malmö

Plateau of Humankind, 49ème Biennale de Venise, Venezia (curated by Harald Szeeman)

Rendez Vous #2, Collection Lambert en Avignon, Avignon

Ingenting, Rooseum Center for Contemporary Art, Sweden

Nothing, CAC Vilnius, Vilnius

Pierre Bismuth & Jonathan Monk, Our Trip Out West, CAC Vilnius, Vilnius

Exploding Cinema, Cinema Without Walls, Museum Boijmans Van Beuningen, Rotterdam

L'Effet Larssen, O.K. Center for Contemporary art, Linz

Film/video Works – Lisson Gallery at 9 Keane Street, Lisson Gallery, London

- 2000

Korean Biennial, Seoul

Orbis Terrarum/Ways of Worldmaking, Museum Plantin-Mauretus, Antwerp

Rendez Vous #1, Collection Lambert en Avignon

Be seeing you, Centre d'art Contemporain de Brétigny, Brétigny

- 1999

Fourth Wall, National Theatre, London

Cinema, Cinema/Contemporary Art and the Cinematic Experience, Stedelijk Van Abbemuseum, Eindhoven

8ème biennale de l'image en mouvement, Centre pour l'image en mouvement, Geneva

Let's Get Lost, Saint Martin School of Art, London

- 1998

The Cinema Project, Künstlerhaus Bethanien, Berlin

Happy Hours, Galerie Yvon Lambert, Paris (with Lawrence Weiner, Douglas Gordon, Marcel Broodthaers, Christian Boltanski)

In-Between, Museum Dhont-Dhaenens, Deurle

La collection Yvon Lambert, œuvres sur papier et photographies, Yokohama Museum, Yokohama

La terre est ronde, nouvelle narration, Musée d'art contemporain de Rochechouart, Rochechouart

Speed, Whitechapel Art Gallery and The Photographer's Gallery, London

Disrupting The Scene, Darkroom Gallery, Cambridge

- 1997

Instant donnés, Musée d'art moderne de la Ville de Paris/ARC, Paris

Jonctions, Palais des Beaux-Arts, Brussels

Blueprint, De Appel, Amsterdam

At One Remove, The Henry Moore Institute, Leeds

Coïncidences, Fondation Cartier pour l'art contemporain, Paris

International Film Festival, Rotterdam

Wish you were here too, 83 Hill St, Glasgow

- 1996

Wish You Were Here, De Appel, Amsterdam

Fabbrica Europa, Stazione Leopoldo, Firenze

Perfect, Galerie Mot & Van den Boogaard, Brussels

Host, Otto Berchem Projects, Amsterdam

Il futuro dello sguardo, Museo Civico, Prato

- 1995

Ideal Standard Summertime, Lisson Gallery, London

Stoppage, Villa Arson, Nice

CCC, Tours

Watt, Witte de With, Rotterdam

Beyond Belief, Lisson Gallery, London

== Galleries ==
Pierre Bismuth is represented by the following galleries:

- Jan Mot, Bruxelles
- Galerie Bugada & Cargnel, Paris
- Christine König Galerie, Vienne

He has among others also exhibited at the Galerie Yvon Lambert in Paris, at the Lisson Gallery in London, at Sonia Rosso in Turin, at Roger Pailhas in Marseille and also at Mary Boone in New-York.
