= Anne Wölk =

Contemporary German painter

Anne Wölk (born 1982) is a German painter who lives and works in Berlin. She is best known for her paintings of romantic starscapes and use of popular culture and science fiction imagery that hint at ideas of a cosmic "life beyond Earth". Romanticism and utopia are key themes in her work, and she is well regarded among contemporary conceptual and figurative artists in Berlin.

== Early life and education ==
Wölk was born in 1982 and was raised in Jena, in former East Germany. Jena was the center for optics technology and lasers in the former German Democratic Republic (GDR). Deciding from age 15 to become a painter, she developed interest in space landscapes from the Jena Planetarium's cosmic shows of night sky simulations. Her work is now heavily informed by science fiction movies and books, such as Neuromancer (1984) by William Gibson, which predicts an inhabitable cyberspace. Her grandfather encouraged her to draw from a young age and introduced her to western and eastern European influences, as he came from East-Prussian Königsberg, modern-day Kaliningrad. Being raised in a generation of political and cultural division encouraged Wölk to imagine alternate realities. Her imagined space realities recall dreams of freedom experienced by her family members in Germany.

Wölk earned a Bachelor of Fine Arts degree from the University of Fine Arts Burg Giebichenstein Halle, Germany, in 2004. In 2006, she studied at Chelsea College of Fine Art and Design, London, UK, before returning to Germany. In 2007, she graduated from Weißensee Academy of Art Berlin, Germany, with a Bachelor of Fine Arts. By 2009, Wölk had earned a Master in Fine Arts from The Weißensee Academy of Art Berlin, Germany. Wölk's career took a surprising kick-start at the age of 24 when her painting Dog Girl (2006) was purchased by the Elgiz Museum and shown alongside well-established artists such as Cindy Sherman, Tracey Emin and Sarah Morris. Wölk is embedded in the contemporary art scene of Berlin, Germany while selling, exhibiting and working internationally.

== Work ==
Wölk works primarily in oil paints while also employing mixed media with acrylics and aerosol. Her paintings are reminiscent of nocturnal landscapes and incorporate visual features of science fiction films. Her work captures cinematic landscapes with visually multilayered narrations and a fantastical interpretation of nature. Her use of birch trees is informed by the Russian meaning for the tree as a symbol of virginal beauty, which allows her to play with illusions and representations of reality. Her sense of space creates an illusion of infinity through an impression of space travel or life beyond Earth.

Wölk's pieces are also strongly symbolic of the future of science and technology, using information from the advances in satellite and camera technology. Her series Planet Spheres, 2019, are three-dimensional paintings made with acrylic paint and styrofoam. These works are clear representations of astronomical influence, mirroring the shape of globes, the 360-degree view invites an interaction of telescopic imagery. Her most recent series Nebulae, 2020, is inspired by the aesthetic construction of gasses like helium and hydrogen, combined to give birth to interstellar dust. The vastness of cosmic space in her work creates an unimaginable distance between human life and the possibility of "life beyond Earth". While her series Starscapes, 2018–2010, pushed for a visual reality of what extraterrestrial colonies could look like: a lifestyle of starry skies, LED lighting and cinematic embrace.

Wölk's works are inspired by the astronomical works of Russell Crotty, as seen in her work Second Earth, 2019, (40 cm sphere, Acrylic on Styrofoam). The hyperrealistic night sky drawings of Vija Celmins appear to inspire Wölk's realm in the use of telescopic space imagery. Aert van der Neer's delicate nocturnal landscapes have informed Wölk's use of light in a very traditional sense, as seen in her work The Multiverse, 2018, (50 x 70 cm, acrylic on canvas).

== Career ==
Since 2009, Wölk has become known for her works of colourful birch trees and science fiction landscapes. Her work is identifiable by her use of indanthrone blue to produce the depth and mystery of space and time.

She has been nominated for an array of awards and scholarships. Her awards include the national Studienstiftung des Deutschen Volkes scholarship and a See.me Category Award for the ArtPrize competition 'Art Takes Paris', judged by directors from The Andy Warhol Museum in New York, Lisson Gallery, and the Marianne Boesky Gallery. Wölk has been exhibiting in art fairs and private galleries and has been selling on the international market since the early 2000s, including Spain, Korea, Turkey, Austria and others. She has been a part of a handful of residencies, including the Tag und Nacht at Werkstatt Plettenberg 2008, the 2012 Bodensee Art Fund Residency, and the artist-in-residence grant in Goriska Brda, Slovenia awarded by the German Embassy, 2014. She did another art residency in Vižinada,Croatia as part of a travel grant called "Art Circle Residency"

Wölk has exhibited alongside other well known contemporary artists such as Robert Rasuchenberg, Johannes Wohnseifer, Azade Köker, and Stephan Balkenhol. Wölk currently is represented by 5 Pieces Gallery, Bern, Switzerland and Alfa Gallery, Miami, USA. She also has been professionally recognised through workshops and lectures she has offered, and has featured in podcasts and coordinating education programmes. Since 2008, Wölk has been a senior teacher in the Painting Department at the Fine Art Faculty of Jugendkunstschule in Pankow, Berlin.

== Collections ==
- Proje 4L, Elgiz Museum of Contemporary Art, Istanbul, Turkey.
- CICA Museum, Gimpo, South Korea.
- Collection of ArtSuites Hotel Group Istanbul/Bodrum, Turkey.
- The Sketchbook Project, Brooklyn Art Library, New York, USA.
- Adham El-Khalil Art Collection, Beirut, Lebanon.
- Max Winzer Art Collection, Coburg, Germany.
- Andreas Wagner Art Collection, Dresden, Germany.
