= See.me =

The See.me logo as of 2012.

See.me (founded as 'Artists Wanted' in 2007) was an American web-based arts organization originally based in Long Island City, Queens, in New York City. The SeeMe website features emerging artists and SeeMe hosts photography competitions and exhibitions throughout the year.

== Description ==
=== Organization ===
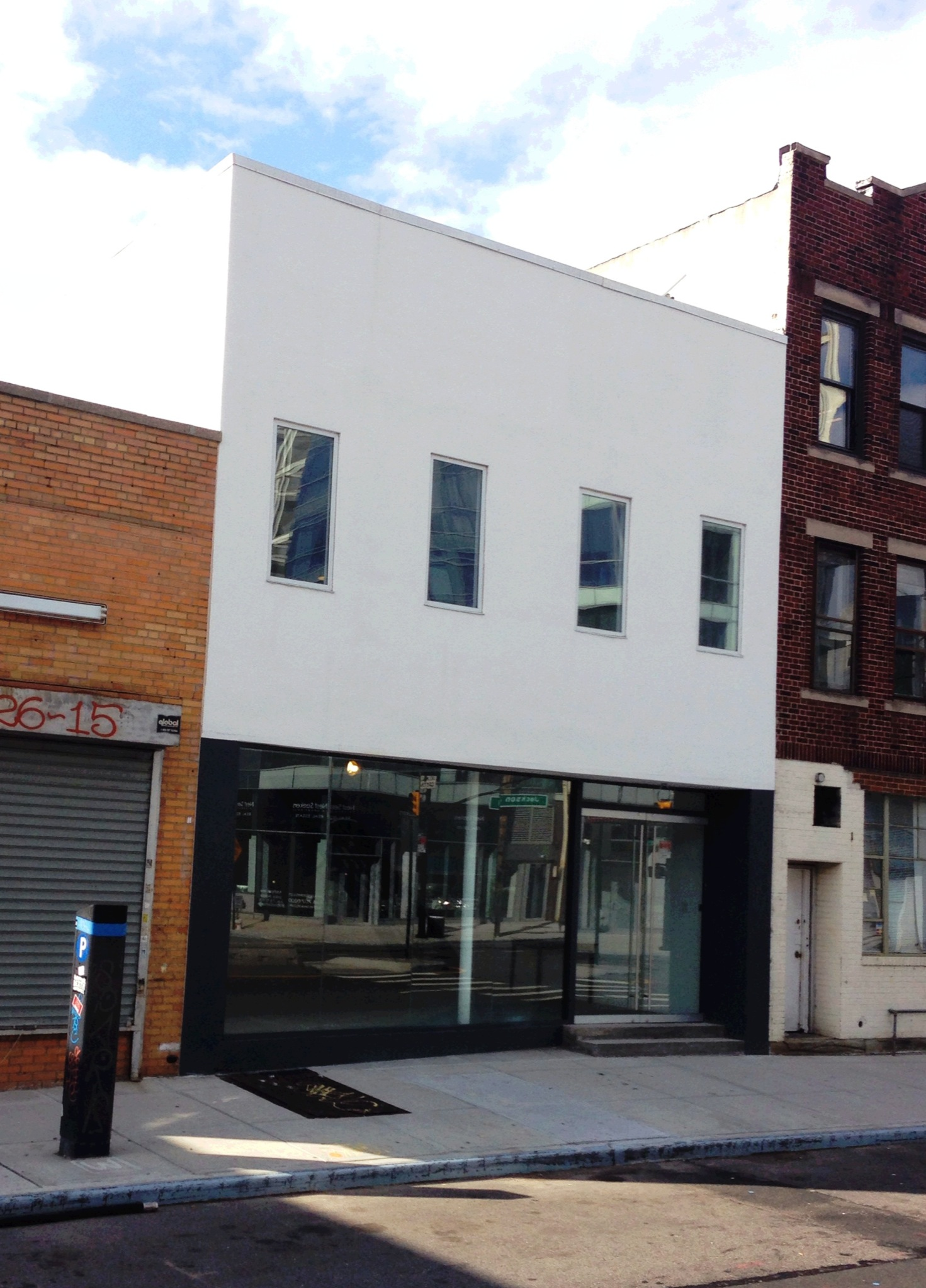
The See.Me gallery space

See.me specializes in providing online profiles that creatives can use to display, promote, and gain support for their work. The site caters to artists, photographers, musicians, designers and creative enthusiasts. Users are encouraged to share their work and show support for fellow creatives in order to gain traction for competition entries. See.me does not represent specified artists, and competition winners are shown in a digital slide show in Long Island City.

The organization runs a number of annual competitions offering cash prizes. These are typically gallery shows, magazine spreads, and grants. See.me’s business model is a mixture of free and paid services; paid services are accompanied by additional perks and benefits. Most competitions are presided over by a chosen panel of renowned judges, though select awards are given to artists whose work receives the most votes submitted online. See.me is considered a pioneer of arts-focused social media.

In October 2012 See.me released a mobile app allowing users to access and edit their portfolios on the go.

=== Website ===
See.me offers online profiles and competition entry pages.

== Competitions ==
Regular annual competitions include ‘Art Takes Miami’, ‘Self’, ‘Year in Review’, ‘One Life’ and ‘Exposure’ (both exclusively for photography).

One-off competitions include ‘This Urgent Moment’ (2007), ‘Art Vs. Design’ (2009), ‘Art Takes London’ (2011) and ‘Art Takes Times Square’ (2012).

=== Art Takes Times Square ===
In 2012, See.me teamed up with chashama and the Times Square Alliance to host 'Art Takes Times Square'. The competition's grand prize winner, Vicki DaSilva, had her chosen work, 'Jasmine/Never Sorry (for Ai Weiwei)' (2011) shown on several Times Square billboards from the unveiling event on June 18 through to July 31, 2012.

Around 5000 competition participants had their work shown on specially erected digital billboards at the June 18th event. In total, 35,000 artists entered the competition. Several news outlets including the New York Times, ABC and NY1 covered the event.

=== Grand Prize winners ===
- Leo Stevanovic, Macedonia – Art Takes Times Square (2013)
- Francis A Willey- Art takes time square
- Layla Sailor – Art Takes Paris (2013)
- Jiwon Kim – Exposure (2013)
- Avery Lawrence – Art Takes Miami (2012)
- Li Xinzhao – One Life (2012)
- Jun Kim – Self (2012)
- Vicki DaSilva – Art Takes Times Square (2012)
- Andreas Von Gehr – Year in Review (2011)
- Laetitia Soulier – Exposure (2011)
- Ursula Sprecher & Andi Cortellini – Art Takes Miami (2011)
- Mathieu Asselin – One Life (2011)
- Yuhi Hasegawa – Art Takes London (2011)
- Stephen O’Donnell – Power of Self (2011)
- Francisco Javier Medina Lopez – Year in Review (2010)
- Jennifer Catron & Paul Outlaw – Year in Review (2010)
- Stig Marlon Weston – Focus Project (2010)
- Tim Sullivan – Art Takes Miami (2010)
- Lisa Wiltse – One Life (2010)
- Andrea Galvani – Exposure (2010)
- Surabhi Saraf – Art Vs. Design (2009)
- Cheng Chang Wu – Power of Self (2009)
- Pete Eckert – Exposure (2008)
- Kim Holleman – This Urgent Moment (2007)

=== Category award winners ===
- Chase Jones, Category Winner: Motion + Sound – Art Takes Paris (2013)
- Thomas Jackson, Category Winner: Photography – Art Takes Paris (2013)
- Crystal Wagner, Category Winner: Installation – Art Takes Paris (2013)
- Johan Andersson, Category Winner: Painting – Art Takes Paris (2013)
- Anne Wölk, Category Winner: Design – Art Takes Paris (2013)
- Antonio Pelayo, Category Winner: Painting & Illustration – Art Takes Miami (2012)
- Hali Maltsberger, Category Winner: Design & Illustration – Art Takes Miami (2012)
- Spencer Murphy, Category Winner: Photography – Art Takes Miami (2012)
- Faber Lorne, Category Winner: Sculpture & Installation – Art Takes Miami (2012)
- Hara Katsiki, Category Winner: Motion + Sound – Art Takes Miami (2012)
- Kathy Horan, Category Winner: Design & Illustration – Art Takes Miami (2011)
- Mark Ingham, Category Winner: Motion + Sound – Art Takes Miami (2011)
- Patty Carrol, Category Winner: Photography – Art Takes Miami (2011)
- Dave Eppley, Category Winner: Sculpture & Installation – Art Takes Miami (2011)
- Daniel Horowitz, Category Winner: Painting + Drawing – Art Takes Miami (2011)
