= Alban Muja =

Kosovan visual artist

Alban Muja (born 1980) is a Kosovan contemporary artist and film-maker. In 2019 he represented Kosovo at the 58th Venice Biennale with the project Family Album. . In his work he is mostly influenced by the social, political and economical transformation processes in wider surrounding region, he investigates history and socio-political themes and links them to his position in Kosovo and the region. His works cover a wide range of media including video installation, films, drawings, paintings, photographs and performance which have been exhibited extensively in various exhibitions and festivals.. His film Mua besoj më shpëtoi portreti (I Believe the Portrait Saved Me) premiered at the 75th Berlinale and was nominated for a European Film Award.

== Exhibitions (selection) ==
- 2024 - ‘Legendary Dog’ | Ulay & Alban Muja, Charim Gallery, Vienna, Austria ; ‘THE FADING LINE: Stories on the Edge of Legality’ Museum of Contemporary Art Skopje, N.Macedonia ; ‘Fragments of Walls’ Trieste Contemporanea’, Trieste, Italy
- 2023 - 'Above Everyone' Charim Gallery, Vienna, Austria; 'Bodies of Identities' Casino Luxembourg – Forum d'art contemporain, Luxembourg, Luxembourg; '4th Autostrada Biennale', Prizren, Pristina Mitrovica, Kosovo
- 2022 - 'Urban Text : This Space Called Balkans', Institut Cultures Islam, Paris, France; Manifesta 14', Pishtina, Pristina, Kosovo 'Hot Mess', Kühlhaus, Berlin, Germany
- 2021 - 'Beyond Borders', Center for Contemporary Arts, Celje, Slovenia; 'Whatever Happens, We Will Be Prepared', The National Gallery of Kosovo, Pristina, Kosovo 'In spite of everything, there is a wall' Charim Gallery, Vienna, Austria
- 2021 - 'Family Album' ISCP, New York, United States; 3rd Autostrada Biennale - What If a Journey..., Prizren, Kosovo 'Bigger Than Myself: Heroic Voices from Ex-Yugoslavia' Maxxi Museum Rome, Italy
- 2020 – 3rd Industrial Art Biennial 'Ride Into the Sun' Rijeka, Croatia Curated by 20 'HYBRID Unknown Identities' Galerie Raum mit Light, Vienna, Austria, Family Album, Ludwig Museum, Budapest, Hungary, 58th. Venice Biennale - May You Live In Interesting Times, La Biennale di Venezia, Venice, Italy NSK State in Time, viennacontemporary Vienna, Austria F.M The Process, Petrit Gallery, Cite des Arts, Paris, France 'All That We Have In Common' MOMus Experimental Center for the Arts Thessaloniki, Greece
- 2018 – 'Stranger Than Paradise' MeetFactory Prague, Czech Republic 'All That We Have In Common' Museum Of Contemporary Art Skopje, North Macedonia
- 2017 – Autostrada Biennale 2017 - The Future of Borders, Autostrada Biennale, Prizren, Kosovo 'Symptoms of Society' Zhejiang Art Museum Hangzhou, China;'Migration of fear' Koroska Gallery of Fine Arts Slovenj Gradec, Slovenia; Westkunst – Ostkunst. A Selection from the Collection, Ludwig Museum Budapest, Hungary; 'Utopia / Dystopia: Architecture, City, Territory' Mestna Galerija Ljubljana, Slovenia; 'The Travellers' Kumu Art Museum, Tallinn, Estonia; 'Symptoms of Society' Guangdong Museum of Art, Guangzhou, China; 'Migration of fear' Forum Stadpark, Graz, Austria; 'Omul Negru' Galeria Nicodim, Los Angeles, United States
- 2016 – 'Brotherhood Phallicism' Museum of Fine Art, Split, Croatia; The whale that was a submarine' Ludwig Museum, Budapest, Hungary; 'The Travellers' Zacheta National Gallery of Art, Warsaw, Poland; 2016 – 'Normalities' Austrian Cultural Forum, New York, United States
- 2015 – 3rd Mardin Biennial - Mythologies, Mardin Biennial Mardin, Turkey; 'Theories on Forgetting' Gagosian Gallery, Beverly Hills, United States; 'From Brotherhood to Brotherly Love' Museum of Modern and Contemporary Art of Rijeka, Rijeka, Croatia; 'From Brotherhood to Brotherly Love' 'Trieste Contemporanea, Trieste, Italy
- 2014 – 'I never knew how to explain' Skuc Gallery, Ljubljana, Slovenia; 'Balcony to the Balkans' Staatliche Kunsthalle Baden-Baden, Baden-Baden, Germany
- 2013 – 2nd Project Biennial Of Contemporary Art, D-0 Ark Underground Project Biennial of Contemporary Art, Konjic, Bosnia and Herzegovina
- 2012 – 'Hebron Road/Ridge Route', Art Cube Gallery, Jerusalem, Israel; 'Mediterranean – Arrivals and Departure', Ancona, Italy; 'Cross-Time Stories' Wallach Art Gallery, Columbia University, New York, United States
- 2011 – 'Spaceship Yugoslavia' NGBK, Berlin, Germany; 'Its all about names' KC Tobacna 001-Mesnta Museum, Ljubljana, Slovenia; 'Politics of naming' Myymala2 Gallery, Helsinki, Finland; '255 804 km^{2}' – Brot Kunsthalle, Vienna, Austria
- 2010 – 'The Another Side of The Coin' Škuc Gallery, Ljubljana, Slovenia; 'Qui Vive?' Moscow International Biennale, Moscow, Russia; 'Spasticus Artisticus' Ceri Hand Gallery, Liverpool, United Kingdom
- 2009 – 28th Biennial of Graphic Arts Ljubljana, Slovenia

== Personal life ==
Born in Mitrovica, SFR Yugoslavia, now Kosovo. Muja lives and works in Pristina and Berlin He graduated with a bachelor's and master's degree from the Faculty of Arts, University of Pristina. He is married to photographer and former model Albe Hamiti.
