= Galit Eilat =

Israeli curator and writer

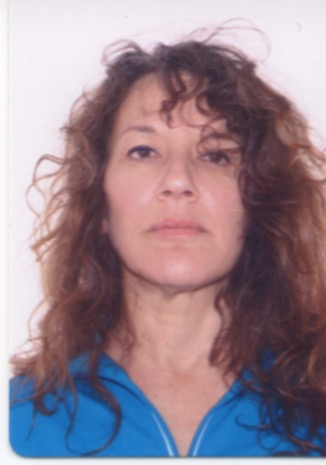
Galit Eilat

Galit Eilat (Hebrew: גלית אילת; born 1965) in Israel, is an independent curator and writer living in the Netherlands.

== Israeli Center for Digital Art ==
Galit Eilat is the founding director of The Israeli Center for Digital Art in Holon (2001 - 2010). During her directorship, she curated numerous exhibitions presenting both Israeli and international artists. Among the projects was the trilogy Hilchot Shchenim (2003-2005), an attempt to establish a cultural network as a platform for artists and art centres in the Near East, the Mediterranean Basin, as well as in wider circles such as the former Eastern European bloc and the Balkans. In this same line of projects aiming to overcome national borders and limitations dictated by political conditions, Eilat established the Mobile Archive. Initiated in Hamburg in 2007, the Mobile Archive began its journey when each of its stations contributed artworks to the original collection (1500 titles). As of 2015, the archive visited more than seventeen art centres and art academies.

== Ma'arav Magazine ==
Together with Michel Kessus Gdaliyovich she founded Ma’arav ("Ambush"), an online arts and culture magazine, for which she was Chief Editor from 2004 – 2010. Ma’arav was a unique alternative platform on the Israeli media map. In each issue the magazine tackled a specific topic from various angles, including the presentation of relevant art works, talks with creators, debates and educational topics. It focused on issues such as fundamentalism, messianic movements, violence, the place of Judaism in Israeli culture, intellectual property and east–west relationship's impact on the Middle East.

== Liminal Spaces traveling seminars ==
With Eyal Danon, Reem Fadda and Phil Misselwitz she developed the Liminal Spaces traveling seminars (2006-2008). The initial focus of the project was Road 60, which connects Jerusalem and Ramallah, and how it might be possible through art and culture to overcome political, social and physical barriers created by the Israeli occupation of Palestine. Liminal Spaces was not an actual exhibition, but rather a joint research project, a collective micro-residency, production platform and a series of interventionist, site-specific conferences rolled into one. It has since permeated most of the politically engaged art in Israel and Palestine and opened the way for experimental curatorial initiatives well beyond. The book ‘Liminal Spaces’ was published in 2009.

== International Activities: 2010 to Present ==
In 2010 Eilat left her base in Israel. From 2010 – 2013 among other projects she was a Research Curator at Van Abbemuseum. Alongside collaborative projects, she curated the exhibition Politics of Collection, Collection of Politics 2010 as part of the Play Vanabbe series of exhibitions. Yael Bartana's And Europe will be stunned 2012. Black Or White in 2013 Other activities beyond The Netherlands include co-curating the projects Strange and Close at CAPC in Bordeaux 2011. Living Archive at KUB-Arena, Kunsthaus Bregenz. Black and White at Museum of Moderen Art in Warsaw 2011. The solo exhibition of Akram Zaatari: This Day at MG + MSUM Moderna Galerija Ljubljana. It’s Time We Got To Know Each Other, 52nd October Salon, at the Museum of Yugoslav History, Belgrade, Serbia, and And Europe will be stunned, Yael Bartana's presentation at Polish Pavilion at the 54 Venice Biennale 2011.

Eilat is one of the founding members of the Academy of the Arts of the World, founded in 2012, in Cologne.

Eilat co-curated the 31st São Paulo Biennial How to (…) things that don’t exist at Serralves Foundation in Porto together with Charles Esche, Nuria Enguita Mayo, Pablo Lafuente, Oren Sagiv and associate curators Benjamin Seroussi and Luiza Proença. In 2014, she co-curated the exhibition Rainbow in the Dark with Sebastian Cichocki in collaboration with SALT, İstanbul and the Museum of Modern Art in Warsaw. This show, about religious and secular in art from a post-secular perspective, premiered at SALT, İstanbul followed by a more extensive presentation at Malmö's Malmö Konstmuseum. She curated the exhibition The Presence of the Real, supported by the EU funded project Culture for All - Phase III, managed by the European Union Office in Kosovo. She curated the solo exhibition by Sokol Beqiri, Neither a Friend nor an Enemy, at National Museum of Fine Arts (Albania).

Since June 2018 Galit Eilat is the director of Meduza Foundation and currently she is developing a large scale international research project entitled Syndrome of the Present with partners in Amsterdam, Istanbul and Thessaloniki. The first seminar in the project took place in Thessaloniki in 2018 and the second in Izmir and Istanbul, bringing together international artists and scholars.

Eilat is the recipient of the Keith Haring Fellowship for Art and Activism, Bard College in 2017–2018. Eilat taught and conducted research at both the Center for Curatorial Studies and the Human Rights Project at the Hannah Arendt Center at Bard College.

== Bibliography ==
=== Co-editor ===
- HOW TO (...) THINGS THAT DON'T EXIST. Catalogue 31st Bienal de São Paulo | Fundação Bienal de São Paulo, 2014.
- C.H.O.S.E.N. Reader. The Israeli Center for Digital art, Holon, Israel, 2014
- A Cook Book For Political Imagination. Co-editor with Sebastian Cichocki. Zachęta National Gallery of Art, Warsaw, 2011. ISBN 978-1-934105-53-5
- 52nd October Salon | Symptoms of unresolved conflict. Co-editor with Alenka Gregoric̆. Cultural Centre of Belgrade, 2011
- Liminal Spaces. The Israeli Center for Digital Art, Holon, 2009.

=== Contributions ===
- 'I Can't Work Like This', A Reader on Recent Boycotts and Contemporary Art. Sternberg Press. 2016 ISBN 978-3-95679-250-2
- 'Collectivity, Conflict, Imagination, Transformation', The Curatorial Conundrum. What to Study? What to Research? What to Practice? MIT Press. Co-published with the Center for Curatorial Studies Bard College / Luma Foundation. 2016 ISBN 978-0-262-52910-5
- 'The Errorist Theatre. What is political theatre today?', Not Just a Mirror. Looking for the Political Theater of Today. Publisher Alexander Verlag. 2015 ISBN 978-3-89581-378-8
- Two Minutes of Standstill, A Collective Performance by Yael Bartana. Edited by Florian Malzacher, Stefanie Wenner. Publisher Sternberg-Press. 2014 ISBN 978-3-95679-061-4
- 9 Artists. Walker Art Center. 2013 ISBN 978-1-935963-06-6
- 'A Good Drug Dealer, Galit Eilat in conversation with Artur Żmijewsk', Forget Fear. 7th Berlin Biennale for Contemporary Art. 2012
- 'A Curator’s Ethical Code in Conflict Zones', Scandalous, A Reader on Art and Ethics. Editor Nina Möntmann. Publisher Sternberg-Press and Royal Institute of Art, Stockholm 2009 ISBN 978-1-934105-87-0
- Yael Bartana: Videos & Photographs. Publisher Van Abbemuseum 2006 ISBN 978-90-8690-003-9
- Avi Mograbi: Films and Video Works. Publisher Van Abbemuseum 2008 ISBN 978-90-8690-080-0
