= Libia Castro and Ólafur Ólafsson =

Artist duo

Libia Castro (born 1970, Madrid) and Ólafur Ólafsson (born 1973, Reykjavík) are collaborative artists based in Rotterdam and Berlin.

== Career ==
Formed in 1997, their artistic practice has grown to encompass a variety of media, genres, and disciplines, from political history to gender studies and sociology. Castro and Ólafsson have exhibited their works at various international venues, including TENT Rotterdam, Liverpool Biennial, the 19th Sydney Biennale, the Centre for Contemporary Arts, Glasgow, and the 54th Venice Biennale.

== Solo exhibitions ==
2014

- Your Country Does Not Exist, Trondheim Kunstmuseum, Trondheim, Norway

2013

- Asymmetry, Tent, Rotterdam, Netherlands

2012

- Under Deconstruction, The National Gallery of Iceland, Reykjavík, Iceland
- Two Ongoing Projects, Galerie Opdahl, Berlin, Germany

2011

- Tu País no Existe, curated by Juan Antonio Alvarez, Centro Andaluz de Arte Contemporáneo, Seville, Spain
- Under Deconstruction, curated by Ellen Bluemenstein, Icelandic Pavillon, 54 Biennale di Venezia, Venice, Italy
- Constitution of Republic of Iceland, curated by Hanna Styrmisdottir, Hafnarborg Art Center, Hafnarfjörður, Iceland

2010

- Lobbyists, curated by Birta Guðjónsdóttir, The Living Art Museum, Reykjavík, Iceland

2009

- Caregivers, curated by Inga Þórey, Suðsuðvestur, Iceland
- Libia Castro & Ólafur Ólafsson, curated by Riccardo Crespi, text by Gabi Scardi, Galleria Riccardo Crespi, Milan, Italy
- Libia Castro & Ólafur Ólafsson, Galerie Opdahl, Berlin, Germany

2008

- Libia Castro & Ólafur Ólafsson, Galeria Adhoc, Vigo, Spain
- Recent Works, curated by Valeria Schulte-Fischedick, Künstlerhaus Bethanien, Berlin, Germany
- Everybody Is Doing What They Can, curated by Hafpor Yngvason, Reykjavík Art Museum, Reykajavík, Iceland

2007

- Libia Castro & Ólafur Ólafsson, curated by Julieta Manzano, CAC Málaga, Málaga, Spain

2006

- Demolitions and Excavations, Galerie Martin Van Zomeren, Amsterdam, Nethlerlands

2005

- Bone-lady and The Happy Campaign, curated by Theo Tegelaers, Ministry of Work and Social Affairs, The Hague, Netherlands
- Dubble Ruimte, RAM Foundation, Rotterdam, Netherlands
- Dyn Lan Bestiet Net, Deiska The Collection, Amsterdam, Netherlands
- Dyn Lan Bestiet Net, Kunsthuis Syb, Friesland, Netherlands
- Chapter 3: The Noise of Money, Museum ASÍ, Reykjavík, Iceland

2004

- Wir Wünschen Ihnen Einen Angenehmen Aufenthalt, curated by Theo Tegelaers, De Appel CAC, Amsterdam, Netherlands
- Mind Your Step, Step Your Mind, curated by T. Maars, Galerie Akademie Minerva, Groningen, Netherlands

2003

- 20 Minus Minutes, curated by Vasif Kortun, Platform Garanti Contemporary Art Center, Istanbul, Turkey
- Camurdili Araniyor! Camurdili Araniyor! / Searching for a Clay Language! Searching for a Clay Language!, Oda Projesi, Istanbul, Turkey

2002

- Un Elemento Más, curated by Natalia Bravo, Alternativa Siglo 21, Málaga, Spain
- Mjög Skemmtileg Sýning, curated by Þóra Þóristdóttir, Gallerí Hlemmur, Reykjavík, Iceland
- Een Plassende Vrouw, curated by Marc Bijl, Central Train Station, Rotterdam, Netherlands

2001

- Etnoskitzco, curated by Arno von Roosmalen, TENT Art centre, Rotterdam, Netherlands

2000

- The Last Minute Show, Straumur Artist Residence, Hafnarfjörður, Iceland
- Shop Window at Laugavegur, Gallerí Sævar Karl, Reykjavík, Iceland
- Baggage + 8 Days / An Excavation, TOKO, Groningen, Netherlands
- 7 Performances, Dans Werkplaats Groningen, Groningen, Netherlands

1999

- De Voormalige HBS, De Voormalige HBS, Groningen, Netherlands

1998

- Finding Each Other, Galerie Sign, Groningen, Netherlands

== Awards ==
2009

- Prix de Rome, Rijksakademie, Amsterdam, Netherlands
- Il Ventre di Napoli Project, BKVB Fonds, Amsterdam, Netherlands

2007

- (shortlist), Prix Gilles Dusein, Paris, France

2006

- (shortlist), Menningarverðlaun DV, Iceland
