= Aydan Murtezaoğlu =

Turkish artist (born 1961)

Aydan Murtezaoğlu (born 1961 in Istanbul) is a visual artist working mainly in photography and installation. She lives and works in Istanbul.

== Education ==
Murtezaoğlu was born in Istanbul, Turkey in 1961. She completed her secondary education at Lycée Notre Dame de Sion Istanbul. Between 1980 and 1984 she studied economy in Istanbul University. After her graduation, Murtezaoğlu applied to the State School of Applied Fine Arts Department of Painting and graduated in 1991. She earned a Master of Fine Arts degree in the same department.

== Works ==
"From The Blackboard to The Pilot, from The Room Temperature to Hip-Activities, my work tries to understand the meta-discourse, things that are managed in spite of other things, the language appropriating the speech in the name of others, and the interlocutor. That refers to an endeavour to understand how a world view massifies in a certain awareness, and how it remains and sticks as a meta-course. The effort in my works is focused on reflecting upon these problematics, and the issue of artistic identity before the event."

Aydan Murtezaoğlu explores the socio-political movements and its effects on contemporary Turkish society. From the early 1990s until today her works deal with traumatic results of state-run modernism, and through minimal interventions she addresses themes including gender, history of past and future, cultural transitions and shifts from the social reality.

Her photographs are "overtly political and committed, which does not mean that they are not gentle and light—seemingly. The artist’s demanding attitude is subtly revealed from mise en scène to mise en scène, where she appropriates the protagonist’s place, but without toppling over into the documentary vein or autobiography... Aydan Murtezaoğlu instills a wholesome and subtle militancy through her photographs, where femininity assumes a majestic pose."

== Exhibitions ==
Aydan Murtezaoğlu participated in the 4th, 6th and 11th (collaborative project with Bülent Şangar) International Istanbul Biennials, the 2nd Tirana, 1st Moscow, 3rd and 5th Cetinje Biennials.

Her other exhibitions include Continuity Error, SALT, Istanbul (2018), Second Exhibition, Arter, Istanbul (2010), U-Turn, Quadrennial for Contemporary Art, Copenhagen (2008), EindhovenIstanbul, Van Abbemuseum, Eindhoven (2006), Normalization, Platform Garanti Contemporary Art Center, Istanbul (2005), In the Gorges of the Balkans: A Report, Kunsthalle Fridericianum, Kassel (2003), Looking Awry, apexart, New York (2003), In Search of Balkania, Neue Galerie, Graz (2002), Springtime, Nikolaj Kunsthal, Copenhagen (2000), Becoming a Place, Proje4L, Istanbul (2001), İskorpit: Aktuelle Kunst aus Istanbul, Haus der Kulturen der Welt, Berlin (1998), Number Fifty / Memory/Recollection II, Akaretler, Istanbul (1992).
