= Elgiz Museum =

Museum in Istanbul

Coordinates: 41°06′35″N 29°01′14″E

Elgiz Museum (Turkish: Elgiz Müzesi) is a private collection museum, founded by Dr. Can Elgiz.

The museum opened in 2001, when there were no non-profit institutions in Turkey dedicated to contemporary art. Established with a mission to promote the development of contemporary art in Turkey, the initiative focused on giving space, support and international visibility to projects by young Turkish artists. As new art institutions and museums bloomed in Turkish art scene in 2005, the collectors converted the space to a private collection museum under the name ‘Elgiz Museum of Contemporary Art’ to host the Elgiz Collection. The space was founded under the name Proje4L Istanbul Museum of Contemporary Art in 2001. Notable directors include Vasif Kortun (2001-2003), Fulya Erdemci (2003-04), and Işın Önol (2006-09).

Elgiz Museum is located in the dynamic business district of Istanbul, Maslak and is open to the public free of charge.

== Collection ==
Elgiz Collection consists of works of by influential Turkish and international artists, such as Ömer Uluç, Fahrelnissa Zeid, Eric Fischl, Günther Förg, Gilbert & George, Azade Köker, Abdurrahman Öztoprak, Doug Aitken, Darren Almond, Kezban Arca Batibeki, Bedri Baykam, Tine Benz, Olivier Blanckart, Peter Bonde, Daniele Buetti, Gülsün Karamustafa, Ergin Cavusoglu, Mustafa Kunt, Loris Cecchini, Stephen Dean, Fausto Gilberti, Kendell Geers, Roman Lipski, Anne Wölk, Nezaket Ekici, Friederike Feldmann, Tracey Emin, Jan Fabre, Paul Morrison, Ahmet Oran, Lea Asja Pagenkemper, Bruno Peinado, Lisa Ruyter, David Salle, Barbara Kruger, Cindy Sherman, Julian Schnabel, Andy Warhol, Thomas Struth, Markus Oehlen, Tim White-Sobieski, Hiroshi Sugito, David Tremlett, Hale Tenger, Peter Halley, Özlem Günyol, Sol Le Witt, Rebecca Horn, Peter Halley, Paul McCarthy, Fabian Marcaccio, Won Ju Lim, Iskender Yediler, Johannes Wohnseifer, Jonathan Meese, Sarah Morris, Nan Goldin and Robert Rauschenberg. The eclectic content of the collection allows the viewer to enjoy a comprehensive journey through the major contemporary art movements of the last two decades, while promoting the globalization of Turkish art. With the integration of new works by young artists the Elgiz Collection maintains its dynamism and prevalence.

== Premises ==
The space of the Elgiz Museum is established on 2,000 square metres (22,000 sq ft) of exhibition space. Aside from the main hall, reserved for displaying selections from the Elgiz Collection, there are two Project Rooms, a glass Open Archive Room and a conference room. The Project Rooms are commissioned to young Turkish talents to give them a chance to exhibit their work, in some cases, for the first time. In the Open Archive Room gallerists, collectors and art enthusiasts can browse through submitted artist portfolios and contact artists of their interest. The conference room hosts lectures focused on passion for collecting.

== Visiting Hours ==
Elgiz Museum is open from 10:00–17:00, Wednesday to Friday; from 10:00–16:00 on Saturday; and on Tuesday by appointment. Closed on National Holidays. No Entrance Fee Required.

== See also ==
- Istanbul Biennial
