= Mua besoj më shpëtoj portrait =

Mua besoj më shpëtoi portreti
- Directed by: Alban Muja
- Written by: Alban Muja
- Produced by: Edon Rizvanolli
- Starring: Skender Muja
- Cinematography: Samir Karahoda
- Edited by: Enis Saraçi
- Production company: 038 Studio
- Release date: 2025
- Running time: 10 minutes
- Countries: Kosovo; Netherlands
- Language: Albanian

I Believe the Portrait Saved Me (Albanian: Mua besoj më shpëtoi portreti) is a Kosovar–Dutch documentary film by Alban Muja from 2025.

== Synopsis ==
During the Kosovo War, the Kosovar artist Skender Muja was abducted from his hometown of Mitrovica. In a former school that had been converted into a prison camp, he drew a portrait of a Serbian officer. Today, he believes that this drawing saved his life at the time.

== Production ==
The director Alban Muja (born 1980) is a Kosovar artist who studied at the University of Prishtina. Since 2009, he has exhibited internationally. In 2019, he represented Kosovo at the Biennale di Venezia. His body of work includes drawings as well as video installations. The film premiered on 16 February 2025 at the Berlinale, in the Forum Expanded section.

== Reception ==
Prime Minister Albin Kurti congratulated director Muja on the Berlinale selection and praised the Kosovar film industry.

In addition, the film was shortlisted for the 2026 European Film Awards.

== See also ==
- Alban Muja
- Kosovo
