= Otto Berchem =

American artist

- Born: 1967 (age 58–59); Milford, Connecticut, U.S.
- Education: Parsons School of Design (B.A.)

Otto Berchem (born 1967) is an American artist. He lives and works in Bogotá, Colombia.

== Early life and education ==
Otto Berchem was born in Milford, Connecticut in 1967. He obtained his BFA from Parsons School of Design in New York City in 1990. In 1994, he received his MFA from Edinburgh College of Art and in 1995/1996, attended Rijksakademie van beeldende kunsten, Amsterdam.

== Work ==
Berchem's practice explores social and visual codes, focusing on the relationships between language, architecture, history and poetry. His conceptual based practice employs a wide variety of media, including painting, video, public interventions and other unconventional artist activities.

Berchem's interest in codes goes back to 1994’s Men’s Room Etiquette, a public intervention touching upon the unwritten codes of how men behave with other men in public toilets.

With The Dating Market, a project conceived in 2000, Berchem created a series of shopping baskets with a flower motif that patrons of supermarkets could opt for, labeling themselves “available” and looking for a date.

In Temporary Person Passing Through, a work for the 2005 Istanbul Biennial, Berchem investigated the relationship of Istanbul’s street children and their movement within the city, using the visual language of Hobo Signs, a system of symbols employed by itinerant workers in the USA from the 19th to the mid 20th century.

With some of his work the artist continues his exploration of signs, human relationships and codes, to create a chromatic alphabet. Berchem’s chromatic code is inspired by the writings of Jorge Adoum and Vladimir Nabokov, Peter Saville’s designs for the first three New Order albums, and the condition of Synaesthesia (which Nabokov had).

Through the use of this alphabet, Berchem has proposed a series of work reviewing iconic images and creating his own documents by strategically deleting pre-existing meanings and slogans, and replacing them with his interpretation of reality.
