= Istanbul Biennial =

Contemporary art exhibition held biennially in Istanbul, Turkey

Istanbul Biennial İstanbul Bienali
- Genre: Contemporary art
- Begins: Mid September
- Ends: Mid November
- Frequency: Every two years (odd years until 2019, even years starting 2022)
- Locations: Istanbul, Turkey
- Inaugurated: 1987
- Most recent: 2022
- Patron: İstanbul Kültür Sanat Vakfı (IKSV)
- Website: www.iksv.org/en

The Istanbul Biennial is a contemporary art exhibition that has been held biennially in Istanbul, Turkey, since 1987. The Biennial has been organised by the Istanbul Foundation for Culture and Arts (IKSV) since its inception.

== Format ==
Istanbul Biennial adheres to an exhibition model in which the curator, appointed by an international advisory board, develops a conceptual framework according to which a variety of artists and projects are invited to the exhibition. After the first two biennials realized under the general coordination of Beral Madra in 1987 and 1989, IKSV decided to commission a different curator for each edition, starting with the 1992 Istanbul Biennial directed by Vasif Kortun.

Istanbul's 13th biennial in 2013 was overtaken by political events; its theme was art in public spaces but was forced to retreat indoors after many of the scheduled venues filling with plumes of tear gas and water cannon as police and demonstrators clashed had been tuned into a battleground between demonstrators trying to protect the city's Gezi Park.

The 2015 edition presented new works by more than 50 visual artists as well as oceanographers and neuroscientists.

== Past biennials ==
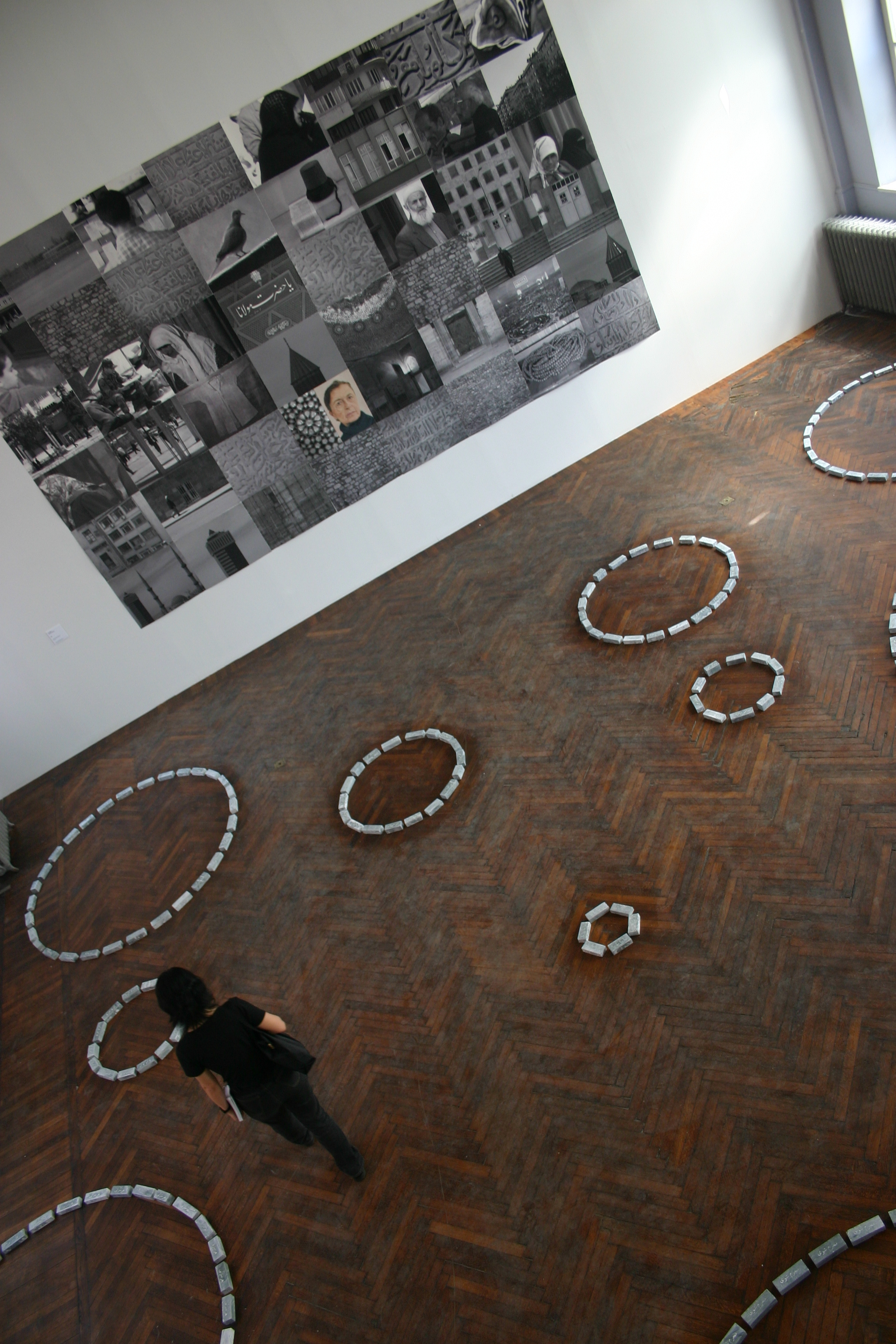
Installation from Istanbul 2005 Biennial

- 1987 - Contemporary Art in Traditional Spaces. General Coordinator: Beral Madra
- 1989 - Contemporary Art in Traditional Spaces. General Coordinator: Beral Madra
- 1992 - Production of Cultural Difference. Director: Vasif Kortun
- 1995 - Orient-ation – The Image of Art in a Paradoxical World. Curator: René Block
- 1997 - On Life, Beauty, Translations and Other Difficulties. Curator: Rosa Martinez
- 1999 - The Passion and the Wave. Curator: Paolo Colombo
- 2001 - Egofugal – Fugue from Ego for the Next Emergence. Curator: Yuko Hasegawa
- 2003 - Poetic Justice. Curator: Dan Cameron
- 2005 - İstanbul. Curators: Charles Esche and Vasif Kortun
- 2007 - Not Only Possible, But Also Necessary: Optimism in the Age of Global War. Curator: Hou Hanru
- 2009 - What Keeps Mankind Alive?. Curators: WHW / What, How & for Whom
- 2011 - Untitled. Curators: Adriano Pedrosa and Jens Hoffmann
- 2013 - Mom, am I barbarian? Curator: Fulya Erdemci
- 2015 - SALTWATER: A Theory of Thought Forms. Drafter: Carolyn Christov-Bakargiev
- 2017 - A Good Neighbour. Curators: Elmgreen & Dragset
- 2019 - The Seventh Continent. Curator: Nicolas Bourriaud
- 2022 - (postponed 2021 biennial) Untitled. Curators: Ute Meta Bauer, Amar Kanwar and David Teh
- 2025 - The Three-Legged Cat. Curator: Christine Tohmé
- 2027 - Curators: Liu Ding and Carol Yinghua Lu

== Past participating artists ==
=== 9th Istanbul Biennial, 2005 ===
- Hüseyin Bahri Alptekin
- Paweł Althamer
- Halil Altındere
- Yochai Avrahami
- Yael Bartana
- Otto Berchem
- Johanna Billing
- Michael Blum
- Daniel Bozhkov
- Pavel Büchler
- Phil Collins
- Smadar Dreyfus
- Lukas Duwenhögger
- Maria Eichhorn
- Gardar Eide Einarsson
- Hala Elkoussy
- Jon Mikel Euba
- Cerith Wyn Evans
- Jakup Ferri
- Flying City
- Luca Frei
- Erik Göngrich
- Gruppo A12
- Daniel Guzman
- Hatice Güleryüz
- IRWIN
- Chris Johanson
- Y.Z. Kami
- Karl-Heinz Klopf
- Servet Kocyigit
- Yaron Leshem
- David Maljkovic
- Oda Projesi
- Paulina Olowska
- Silke Otto-Knapp
- Ahmet Ögüt
- Serkan Özkaya
- Sener Özmen
- Dan Perjovschi
- Ola Pehrson
- Khalil Rabah
- Mario Rizzi
- RUANGRUPA
- Solmaz Shahbazi
- Wael Shawky
- Ahlam Shibli
- Sean Snyder
- Nedko Solakov
- Superflex / Jens Haaning
- Pilvi Takala
- Tintin Wulia
- Alexander Ugay / Roman Maskalev
- Axel John Wieder / Jesko Fezer

=== 12th Istanbul Biennial, 2011 ===
The 12th Istanbul Biennial was curated by Jens Hoffmann and Adriano Pedrosa, and ran from September 17 – November 13, 2011. The shows spanned two buildings at Istanbul's Antrepo.

==== Group exhibitions ====
- "Untitled" (Ross)
- "Untitled" (History)
- "Untitled" (Abstraction)
- "Untitled" (Passport)
- "Untitled" (Death by Gun)

==== Solo artists ====
- Zarouhie Abdalian
- Bisan Abu-Eisheh
- Jonathas de Andrade
- Nazgol Ansarinia
- Edgardo Aragón
- Marwa Arsanios
- Yıldız Moran
- Mark Bradford
- Geta Brătescu
- Teresa Burga
- Adriana Bustos
- Elizabeth Catlett
- Claire Fontaine
- Nazım Hikmet Richard Dikbaş
- Simryn Gill
- Tamás Kaszás & Anikó Loránt
- Tim Lee
- Leonilson
- Renata Lucas
- Dóra Maurer
- Tina Modotti
- Füsun Onur
- Ahmet Öğüt
- Vesna Pavlovic
- Rosângela Rennó
- Meriç Algün Ringborg
- Martha Rosler
- Gabriel Sierra
- Nasrin Tabatabai and Babak Afrassiabi (PAGES)
- Hank Willis Thomas
- Camilo Yáñez
- Alessandro Balteo Yazbeck & Media Farzin
- Ala Younis
- Akram Zaatari

== Past venues ==
The 2009 biennial took place at three venues on the European side of the city: Antrepo, or warehouse, No. 3 in Tophane; the Tobacco Warehouse, also in Tophane; and the Feriköy Greek School, in Şişli. All of the art selected for the 2011 edition was shown at one central location, in Warehouses No. 3 and 5 next to the Istanbul Modern museum.

== See also ==
- Istanbul Modern
- Istancool
- Art exhibition
- Proje4L / Elgiz Museum of Contemporary Art
- Dogancay Museum
