= Russell Crotty =

American contemporary artist (born 1956)

- Born: 1956 (age 69–70); San Rafael, California, U.S.
- Education: San Francisco Art Institute (BFA); University of California, Irvine (MFA)
- Occupation: Artist

Russell Crotty (born 1956) is an American contemporary artist who explores the intersections of nature, science, and personal experience, focusing on amateur astronomy, coastal surfing culture, and related landscapes. He records his findings in ink drawings and is known for his suspended, three-dimensional, paper-coated globes and large-scale books. Crotty resides in Southern California.

== Early life and education ==
Russell Crotty was born in San Rafael, California, in 1956. He grew up in a creative environment, with parents who were practicing artists; his father was a sculptor and his mother a ceramist and jeweler; they were active in the Bay Area modern art scene and encouraged him to pursue his own creativity. As Crotty recalls, “I always knew I wanted to be an artist." "My father used to give me 500 sheets of paper a month, and I would go through it doing drawings.” In 1978, Crotty earned his Bachelor of Fine Arts (BFA) from the San Francisco Art Institute (SFAI) and then moved to Southern California to attend the University of California, Irvine, where he earned a Master of Fine Arts (MFA) in 1980.

== Artistic practice ==
=== Surf works ===
Surf Drawing Blue (detail), ballpoint pen on archival paper, 1990.

As a teenager, Crotty often sketched waves and surfers in the margins of his schoolwork while imagining surfing. By the early 1990s, after graduate school and a move to Los Angeles, he began turning these sketches into formal fine art. Using a ballpoint pen, Crotty rendered these imagined surfing scenes in structured, minimal, modernist grids. Within each box, he drew multiple small, frenetic shorthand figures of surfers in various stages of catching waves, creating a distinctive contrast between the rigid grid and the gestures of the artist’s hand.

=== Astronomical works ===
Crotty at the entrance of his Solstice Peak Observatory in 2004.

As a member of his local astronomy club during his youth, Crotty was fascinated by the night sky. In 1994, he rekindled that interest by building his own observatory in the Santa Monica Mountains, which he called the Solstice Peak Observatory; it housed a ten-inch f/8 Newtonian reflector telescope in a small, corrugated metal shed. Unfortunately, the observatory burned down during a Southern California wildfire in 2007. During that time, Crotty began making empirical scientific illustrations sketched directly from his telescope eyepiece. Later, the Journal of the Association of Lunar and Planetary Observers published these drawings, which emphasize celestial details that standard astronomical photography often can’t capture.

M10 Globular Cluster in Ophiuchus, 10 inch Newtonian x90, August 25, 1997, 1998 41’ x 41”, ink on paper

Archiving his visual observations and reimagining their format, Crotty employed the structural technique of his earlier minimalist surf-culture drawings; he filled large sheets of paper with "tight grids" and mapped the multiple states of the planets he had observed. This led to an interest in creating dark circular drawings of fields textured with crosshatched strokes of blue-black ballpoint pen of the celestial bodies. These circular frames mirrored the perspective of looking through a telescope's viewfinder.

Two 72-inch-diameter globe drawings, installed in Santa Monica, CA, 2005

By 2000, Crotty realized that two-dimensional pictorial conventions of his drawings were a constraint, as the ski is an expansive, 3D space rather than a flat backdrop; he decided to push his paper drawings into the room and create suspended globes. He had the core sphere fabricated in Lucite, then had conservators professionally cover it with archival paper, which he would draw on. The finished works, ranging from 8 to 72 inches (20 to 180 centimeters) in diameter, hang from the ceiling at eye level; they resemble a small galaxy of planets, while blending minimal sculpture with drawing.

In 2001, Crotty began compiling his detailed drawings into massive, handmade books that mimic the sequential and interactive nature of stargazing and mapping. They featured his illustrations of the night sky, stars, constellations, planetary landscapes, and coastal rock formations in blue-black ballpoint pen and watercolor washes. He presented them as gallery installations: oversized volumes several feet long, laid flat on large museum-style tables.

== Public collections ==
- Museum of Modern Art (New York)
- Centre Georges Pompidou (Paris)
- Whitney Museum of American Art (New York)
- Museum of Contemporary Art (Los Angeles)
- San Francisco Museum of Modern Art
- Fine Arts Museum, San Francisco
- Museum of Contemporary Art, North Miami
- High Museum of Art (Atlanta)
- 2004, The 5th Gwangju Biennale; A Grain of Dust A Drop of Water

== Awards ==
- 2015 Guggenheim Fellowship, John Simon Guggenheim Memorial Foundation
- 2008 Artists' Fellowship Programme, The Ballinglen Arts Foundation, Ballycastle, County Mayo, Ireland
- 1999 Visual Arts Fellowship, Peter Reed Foundation, NY, NY
- 1991 Visual Arts Fellowship, National Endowment for the Arts
