= Charles Esche =

Dutch and Scottish curator and writer (born 1962)

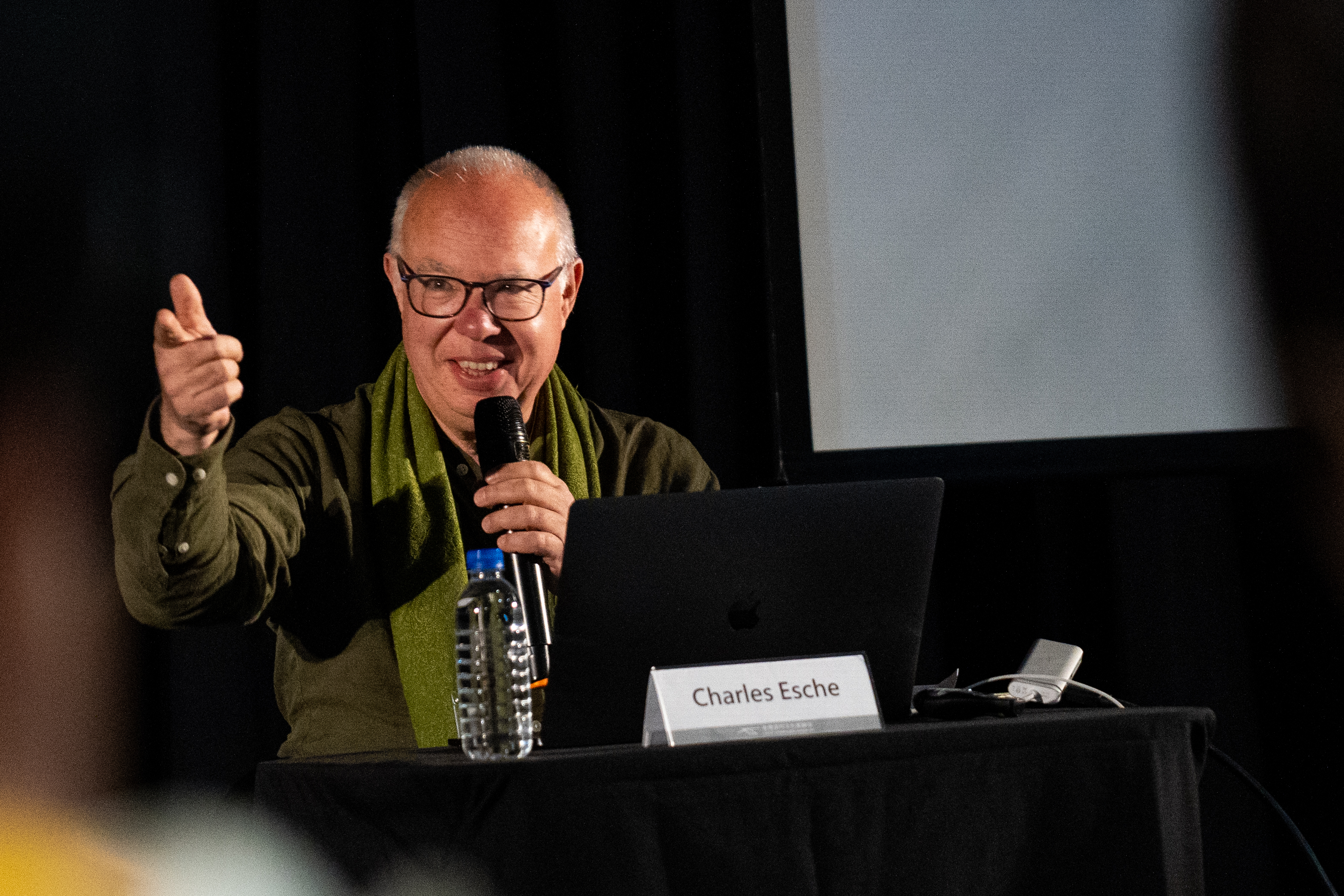
- Born: 1962 (age 63–64); Harrogate, England
- Education: University of Manchester
- Known for: contemporary art, modern art, demodernising

Charles Esche (born 1962) is a museum director, curator and writer. His focus is on art and how it reflects, provokes and influences changes in society. He lives in Amsterdam.

== Career ==
From 2004-24, he was director of the Van Abbemuseum, Eindhoven, Netherlands. In 2012, he established together with 6 other European museums the L'Internationale confederation that aims to establish a European modern and contemporary art institution by 2017. He curated Power and Other Things: Indonesia and Art 1835-today at BOZAR, Brussel in 2017 together with Riksa Afiaty and The Meeting That Never Was at Mo Museum, Vilnius with Anders Kreuger in 2022.

He is professor of curating and contemporary art at the University of the Arts London and Series Editor of the Exhibition Histories series and programme. He co-edited Art and Social Change with Will Bradley.

He has (co)curated a number of international contemporary art biennales and other events including Lost Museum, Kunsthalle Oslo, 2017 and Musée Égaré, Printemps de Septembre, Toulouse 2016; the 31st São Paulo Bienal in 2014, the 2015 Jakarta Biennale.

Earlier he made exhibitions including It Doesn't have to be Beautiful Unless it's Beautiful at National Gallery of Kosovo, Prishtinë, 2012 (with Galit Eilat); Strange and Close for CAPC, Bordeaux, 2011 (a presentation of the Van Abbemuseum Collection); and An Idea for Living, U3 Slovene Triennale, Moderna Galerija, Ljubljana, 2011. In 2009 and 2007 he was co-curator with Khalil Rabah and Reem Fadda of the 2nd and 3rd Riwaq Biennial, Ramallah, Palestine. In 2005 he was co-curator of the 9th International Istanbul Biennial with Vasif Kortun, Esra Saregidik and November Paynter, and in 2002 the co-curator with Hou Hanru and Song Wan Kyung of the Gwangju Biennale, Republic of Korea. In 2000, he co-curated Intelligence: Tate Triennial at Tate Britain, London with Virginia Button and Amateur: Variable Research Initiatives at Kunstmuseum, Göteborg, Sweden.

Between 2000 and 2004 he was the director of Rooseum Center for Contemporary Art in Malmo, Sweden. Before that he was at Tramway, Glasgow (1993–97), and founded the proto-academy in Edinburgh (1997–2001).

His main work has involved the theory and practice of art museums, but also the qualities of the art centre or biennial. His writings on institutional possibility and policy are useful aids to rethinking the relation between art and social change. A valuable book is the reader Art and Social Change published by Afterall and Tate Publishing and co-edited by Esche and Will Bradley. A selection of his texts was published in 2005 under the title Modest Proposals by Baglam Press, Istanbul in Turkish and English, edited by Serkan Ozkaya.

There are a further selection of texts at Academia.edu and Mendeley.

== Awards ==
He holds an honorary doctorate from Edinburgh University. In 2012 he received the European Cultural Foundation's Princess Margriet Award and in 2013 the Minimum Prize from the Pistoletto Foundation. In 2014 he was awarded the CCS Bard College Audrey Irmas Award for Curatorial Excellence.

== Bibliography ==
=== Interviews ===
- Stanhope, Zara (Summer 2014–2015). "How to (read) things that don't exist : Charles Esche in conversation with Zara Stanhope". Art Monthly Australia. 276: 34–37.
