= Oda Projesi =

Artist collective based in Istanbul

Oda Projesi is an artist collaborative based in Istanbul, Turkey that officially formed in 2000 and is made up of three women artists who met as graduate students at Marmara University Fine Art Academy: Özge Acıkkol, Günes Savas and Secil Yersel. Oda Projesi means “Room Project”, and the group seeks to "open up a context for the possibility of exchange and dialogue" and mediate between groups of people who do not normally interact with each other. Their work is collaborative and they purposefully suppress individual authorship to facilitate the creativity of others.

Oda Projesi tries to activate and revitalize public spaces through creating new relations between people, relating to marginalized groups, and celebrating personal connections and every day moments. Their work can be described as relational, communalist, and situationist and a common denominator for all of their work is that they do not show or exhibit a work of art but instead use art as a way to build new relationships between people through the shaping of private and public spaces. They intentionally work in a separate space from established art institutions and bureaucracy, through other social settings like housing areas or schools, so that they can bring their art and conversations to a wider audience than the usual art public. They describe their work this way: "Oda Projesi is so much related to Istanbul in many different senses. First of all, we take inspiration from the spatial relationships that form the city of Istanbul. [This is about] a creative way of thinking about how spaces function. (...) We are making a direct appropriation of the ways in which this city functions, by using the existing potentials of the spaces in which we live together with other people. (...) You can easily see that there are always interventions in urban space in Istanbul, small or big touches... Everybody touches the city and in a way makes it his/her own (Interview, 31 May 2005).".

From 1997 to 2005, Oda Projesi worked through a three-room apartment in the Galata district of Istanbul, providing a space for collaborations and cooperations with their neighbors. These included a children's workshop with the Turkish painter Komet, a community picnic with the sculptor Erik Gingrich, and a parade for children organized by the Team Yapin theater group. The group initially intended to use the space as an artists' studio where they could work in an independent environment away from their parents (they were in their early to mid 20s at the time). They began to interact with their neighbors through the Italian Courtyard of the building, first children and then women, and formed a gathering space. It was at this point that the group decided to form an artist collective to explore the lived experiences they were having.
