= Hüseyin Bahri Alptekin =

Turkish artist and writer (1957–2007)

Hüseyin Bahri Alptekin (1957 in İzmir – 2007 in Istanbul) studied aesthetics, philosophy of art, and sociology in Ankara and Paris. Part of the first generation of Turkish artists considered to be globally active and nationally influential, Alptekin is considered one of the most significant figures in the established contemporary art scene of Istanbul.

Alptekin was fascinated by the gap between the promise of something and its banal reality. This promise could lie in the name of a cheap hotel offering the experience of a distant place, or in the branding of a mass-produced product unconvincingly simulating luxury or exoticism. Alptekin was an artist who saw the profound effects of global capitalism on everyday life, observing the movement of people and products across geographies, particularly in the period following the collapse of the Soviet Union. He himself was also a traveller, studying forms of feral capitalism surging from places considered the fringes of Western modernity. It is the signifiers and remnants of all this—the traces of the burgeoning effects of mobility, trade, and image circulation—that Alptekin used as materials for his art-making, as a means of contemplating what it all represented.

== Career ==
Alptekin worked as a photographer for SIPA Press and wrote for various publications as an art and design critic. Alptekin lectured at Ankara Bilkent University and Istanbul Bilgi University. Starting in the early 1990s, Alptekin focused on an artistic production that explored the effects of globalisation, immigration, and exile, cross-cultural image circulation and anonymous production through travel, personal histories, and archives.

He participated in many local and international panels and symposia on contemporary art. Starting in the early 1990s, Alptekin focused on an artistic production that explored the effects of globalisation, immigration and exile, cross-cultural image circulation and anonymous production through travel, personal histories and archives. His cross‐referential work, consisting of photo‐installations, collages, videos, objects, and once a life‐size truck overloaded with colorful plastic soccer balls, represent a multi‐layered, complex visual language. In 2007, he represented Turkey in the 52nd Venice Biennial with his installation “Don't Complain.” That same year he participated in the exhibition “Global Cities” at the Tate Modern in London. From 2000 to 2004, he ran a non-profit artists' collective called “Sea Elephant Travel Agency” (SETA) that hosted a residency program for artists as well as organized conferences. He was a man of collective and collaborative work; his early collaborations with Michael Morris, his collective work with students “Grup Grip-in” during his years in Bilkent, the meetings he arranged at his space “LOFT,” the “Bunker Research Group” and “Barn Research Group” are just a few of his many accomplishments. The artist's solo exhibitions are “Hüseyin Bahri Alptekin – Facts, Incidents, Accidents, Circumstances, Situations”, Muzeum Sztuki, Łódź (2013), “Festival Istambul Agora – Hüseyin Bahri Alptekin,” SESC Pompeia, São Paulo (2013), “I Am Not A Studio Artist”, Salt, İstanbul (2011), “Global Mockery,” Maison de Folie de Wazemmes, Lille (2009) and “Kriz: Viva Vaia,” Dulcinea Gallery, İstanbul (1999). Exhibitions he participated in include 2nd and 3rd Tirana Biennial (2003, 2005); the Istanbul Biennial (1995, 2005, 2009); Manifesta 5, San Sebastián (2004); “How Latitudes Become Forms,” Walker Art Center, Minneapolis (2003); Cetinje Biennial (2002), for which he won the UNESCO Prize; the São Paulo Biennial (1998).

== Influence ==
In spring 2013, the Istanbul-based platform InEnArt launched in cooperation with Salt Research the online version of Sea Elephant Travel Agency in memory of Hüseyin Bahri Alptekin. Inspired by Jules Verne's novel Kéraban-le-Têtu, Hüseyin Bahri Alptekin initiated the Sea Elephant Travel Agency with a group of fellow artists and art professionals. Following the travels of Jules Verne's stubborn tobacco merchant Kéraban around the coast of the Black Sea, Alptekin intended to gather artists, curators, musicians, architects, historians and scientists to board a boat leaving from Istanbul, following the route of Kéraban and anchoring back in Istanbul again after making a full circle around the Black Sea, stopping at ports of Varna, Constanta, Odessa, Sevastopol, Yalta, Rostov, Novossibirsk, Sochi, Batumi, Trabzon, and Sinop. The online version displays manifestations, performances and exhibitions that took place in the past, mostly in the name of the Black Sea Project and invites artists and art professionals to participate in an ongoing visual and performing arts laboratories beyond any border.

In September 2023, the Istanbul-based gallery galerist were showing the exhibition “Among Friends: One Chapter of a Long Story” curated by Pelin Uran with works by Hüseyin Bahri Alptekin and 16 of his artist friends. During Alptekin‘s lifetime, his friends were closely involved in the artist’s constant search for innovation and new inputs. His passion for collecting items of daily use and his drift through Istanbul were usually done in company with others. Participating artists: Can Altay, Thomas Büsch, Tunç Ali Çam, Grip-in (Ali Cindoruk, Eray Makal, Erhan Muratoğlu), Ayhan Hacıfazlıoğlu, Minna Henriksson & Staffan Jofjell, Şirin İskit, Emre Koyuncuoğlu, Michael Morris, Serkan Özkaya, Camila Rocha, Vahit Tuna, and Nalan Yırtmaç.
