= List of contemporary art museums =

Contemporary art museums around the world specialize in collecting and exhibiting contemporary art. The following is an alphabetical listing of major contemporary art museums, divided by country. A number of such museums are named Museum of Contemporary Art.

== Argentina ==
- Museum of Contemporary Art of Rosario, Rosario

== Armenia ==
- Cafesjian Museum of Art

== Australia ==
- Artspace Visual Arts Centre, Sydney
- Australian Centre for Contemporary Art (ACCA), Melbourne
- Gallery of Modern Art, Brisbane (GOMA, part of QAGOMA), Brisbane
- Monash University Museum of Art (MUMA), Melbourne
- Museum of Contemporary Art Australia (MCA), Sydney
- Museum of Old and New Art, Hobart

== Austria ==
- Albertina Modern (part of the Albertina), Vienna
- 21er Haus, Vienna
- Mumok, Vienna

== Belgium ==
- Museum of Contemporary Art, Antwerp
- KANAL – Centre Pompidou, Brussels
- Stedelijk Museum voor Actuele Kunst, Ghent

== Brazil ==
- Inhotim
- Museum of Contemporary Art, University of São Paulo
- Niterói Contemporary Art Museum

== Bulgaria ==
- Sofia Arsenal - Museum of Contemporary Art (part of the National Gallery)

== Canada ==
- Art Gallery of Ontario, Toronto
- The Blackwood (Blackwood Gallery), Mississauga
- Contemporary Art Gallery (Vancouver)
- Musée d'art contemporain de Montréal
- Museum of Contemporary Art Toronto Canada (MOCA Toronto)
- Vancouver Art Gallery

== Chile ==
- Santiago Museum of Contemporary Art, Santiago
- Museum of Contemporary Art, Valdivia, Valdivia

== China ==
- Museum of Contemporary Art Shanghai, Shanghai
- Sifang Art Museum, Nanjing
- Power Station of Art, Shanghai
- Ullens Center for Contemporary Art, Beijing

== Croatia ==
- Museum of Contemporary Art, Zagreb

== Czech Republic ==
- DOX Centre for Contemporary Art

== Finland ==
- Kiasma, Helsinki

== France ==
- Château de Montsoreau-Museum of Contemporary Art, Montsoreau
- Lille Métropole Museum of Modern, Contemporary and Outsider Art, Villeneuve d'Ascq
- Centre Georges Pompidou, Paris
- Musée d'Art Moderne de la Ville de Paris, Paris
- Musée d'Art Contemporain du Val-de-Marne, Vitry-sur-Seine
- Centre Pompidou-Metz, Metz
- CAPC musée d'art contemporain de Bordeaux, Bordeaux
- Collection Lambert, Avignon
- Les Abattoirs, Musée - Frac Occitanie Toulouse, Toulouse
- Musée d'art moderne et d'art contemporain, Nice

== Germany ==
- Deichtorhallen, Hamburg
- Fotografiska Berlin
- Hamburger Bahnhof, Berlin
- Museum für Moderne Kunst, Frankfurt
- Museum Insel Hombroich, Neuss

== Greece ==
- National museum of Contemporary Art, Athens
- State Museum of Contemporary Arts, Thessaloniki
- Macedonian Museum of Contemporary Art, Thessaloniki

== Hong Kong ==
- M+
- Hong Kong Arts Centre
- Hong Kong Museum of Art

== Iran ==
- Museum of Contemporary Art, Isfahan
- Tehran Museum of Contemporary Art

== Israel ==
- Tel Aviv Museum of Art

== Italy ==
- Peggy Guggenheim Collection, Venice
- Museum of Contemporary Art of Rome, Rome
- MAXXI – National Museum of the 21st Century Arts, Rome
- Galleria Nazionale d'Arte Moderna, Rome
- Galleria Comunale d'Arte Moderna, Rome, Rome
- Padiglione d'Arte Contemporanea, Milan
- Triennale, Milan
- Museo del Novecento, Milan
- Museum of Modern and Contemporary Art of Trento and Rovereto, Trento
- Centro per l'arte contemporanea Luigi Pecci, Prato
- Museo Marino Marini, Florence
- Museo d'Arte Gallarate MAGA, Gallarate
- Museo d'Arte Contemporanea Villa Croce, Genoa
- Lucca Center of Contemporary Art, Lucca

== Japan ==
- Museum of Contemporary Art, Tokyo
- Mori Art Museum, Tokyo
- 21st Century Museum of Contemporary Art, Kanazawa
- Chichu Art Museum, Naoshima

== Liechtenstein ==
- Kunstmuseum Liechtenstein, Vaduz

== Jordan ==
- Jordan National Gallery of Fine Arts

== Mexico ==
- Museo de Arte contemporaneo, Monterrey
- Museo Jumex, Mexico City
- Museo Rufino Tamayo, Mexico City
- Museo Universitario Arte Contemporáneo, Mexico City
- Museo de Arte Moderno, Mexico City
- Museum of Contemporary Art (Aguascalientes), Aguascalientes
- Museo Morelense de Arte Contemporáneo Juan Soriano, Cuernavaca, Morelos

== Morocco ==
- Museum of Contemporary Art (Tangier), Morocco

== Netherlands ==
- Bonnefantenmuseum, Maastricht
- Centraal Museum, Utrecht
- Cobra Museum, Amstelveen
- De Pont Museum of Contemporary Art, Tilburg
- Gemeentemuseum Den Haag, The Hague
- Groninger Museum, Groningen
- Kröller-Müller Museum, Otterloo
- Kunsthal, Rotterdam
- Museum Boijmans Van Beuningen, Rotterdam
- Singer Laren, Laren
- Stedelijk Museum, Amsterdam
- Stedelijk Museum 's-Hertogenbosch, 's-Hertogenbosch
- Van Abbemuseum, Eindhoven
- Van Gogh Museum, Amsterdam

== Norway ==
- Astrup Fearnley Museum of Modern Art, Oslo
- Bergen Kunsthall, Bergen

== Panama ==
- Panama Museum of Contemporary Art, Panama City

== Philippines ==
- Metropolitan Museum of Manila
- Iloilo Museum of Contemporary Art, Iloilo City

== Poland ==
- Museum of Modern Art, Warsaw
- Zachęta, Warsaw
- Ujazdów Castle, Warsaw
- Łaźnia Centre for Contemporary Art, Gdańsk
- Museum of Contemporary Art in Kraków, Kraków
- Muzeum Sztuki in Łódź, Łódź (one of the oldest museums of modern art in the world, opened in 1931)
- Wrocław Contemporary Museum

== Portugal ==
- Soares dos Reis National Museum
- National Museum of Contemporary Art (Portugal) (Museu do Chiado)
- Museu Fundação Serralves
- José Malhoa Museum
- Casa das Histórias Paula Rego
- Museu da Arte, Arquitetura e Tecnologia

== Puerto Rico ==
- Puerto Rico Museum of Contemporary Art, San Juan

== Romania ==
- National Museum of Contemporary Art, Bucharest

== Russia ==
- ART4.RU Contemporary Art Museum, Moscow
- Erarta, Saint Petersburg
- Garage Museum of Contemporary Art, Moscow
- MAGMA, Moscow
- Moscow House of Photography, Moscow
- Moscow Museum of Modern Art, Moscow
- Multimedia Art Museum, Moscow
- National Centre for Contemporary Arts, Moscow
- New Tretyakov Gallery, Moscow

== Serbia ==
- Museum of Contemporary Art, Belgrade

== Singapore ==
- Singapore Art Museum

== South Korea ==
- National Museum of Modern and Contemporary Art, Seoul

== Spain ==
- CAAC, Seville
- CAAM, Las Palmas de Gran Canaria
- Centre d'Art La Panera, Lleida
- Centre d´Art Santa Mónica, Barcelona
- Es Baluard, Palma
- Guggenheim Museum Bilbao, Bilbao
- Fundació Antoni Tàpies, Barcelona
- Fundació Joan Miró, Barcelona
- Instituto Valenciano de Arte Moderno (IVAM), Valencia
- La Casa Encendida, Madrid
- MACBA, Barcelona
- MARCO, Vigo
- Museo Extremeño e Iberoamericano de Arte Contemporáneo, Badajoz
- MUSAC, León
- Museo de Arte Contemporáneo (Madrid)
- Museo de Escultura al Aire Libre de Alcalá de Henares
- MNCARS, Madrid
- Real Academia de Bellas Artes de San Fernando, Madrid
- Tabakalera, San Sebastian

== Sweden ==
- Fotografiska Stockholm
- Moderna Museet
- Moderna Museet Malmö

== Switzerland ==
- Aargauer Kunsthaus
- Kunstmuseum Basel
- Museum of Contemporary Art (Basel)
- Kunstmuseum Bern
- Zentrum Paul Klee, Bern
- Bündner Kunstmuseum
- Kirchner Museum Davos
- Musée d'Art moderne et contemporain (MAMCO), Geneva
- Kunstmuseum Luzern
- Museum zu Allerheiligen, Schaffhausen
- MASI Lugano, Lugano
- Kunstmuseum Solothurn
- Kunstmuseum St. Gallen
- Fotomuseum Winterthur
- Kunsthaus Zürich

== Taiwan ==
- Museum of Contemporary Art Taipei, Taipei
- Taipei Fine Arts Museum, Taipei
- National Taiwan Museum of Fine Arts, Taichung

== Thailand ==
- Bangkok Art and Culture Centre
- Museum of Contemporary Art (MOCA), Bangkok

== Turkey ==
- Borusan Contemporary
- Doğançay Museum
- Istanbul Museum of Modern Art
- Istanbul Contemporary Art Museum (iS.CaM.)
- SALT (institution)
- Elgiz Museum (Proje4L)

== Ukraine ==
- National Art Museum of Ukraine, Kyiv
- Khanenko Museum, Kyiv
- Mystetskyi Arsenal National Art and Culture Museum Complex, Kyiv
- Lviv National Art Gallery, Lviv
- Lviv National Museum, Lviv

== United Kingdom ==
- Tate (formerly known as the Tate Gallery, Liverpool, London and St Ives)
- Arnolfini, Bristol
- BALTIC Centre for Contemporary Art (also known as the Baltic Flour Mill)
- Institute of Contemporary Arts, London
- Whitechapel Gallery, London
- Gallery of Modern Art, Glasgow
- Nottingham Contemporary, Nottingham
- Tramway, Glasgow
- National Galleries of Scotland, Edinburgh
- Middlesbrough Institute of Modern Art, Middlesbrough

== United States ==
- The Aldrich Contemporary Art Museum, Ridgefield, Connecticut
- Artpace, San Antonio, Texas
- Aspen Art Museum, Aspen, Colorado
- Atlanta Contemporary Art Center, Atlanta, Georgia
- Bechtler Museum of Modern Art, Charlotte, North Carolina
- Blaffer Art Museum at the University of Houston, Houston, Texas
- Blue Star Contemporary Art Museum, San Antonio, Texas
- The Broad, Los Angeles, California
- Buffalo AKG Art Museum, Buffalo, New York
- Contemporary Art Museum of Raleigh, Raleigh, North Carolina
- Contemporary Art Museum St. Louis, St. Louis, Missouri
- Contemporary Arts Center, Cincinnati, Ohio
- Contemporary Arts Museum Houston, Houston, Texas
- The Delaware Contemporary, Wilmington, Delaware
- Dia: Beacon, Beacon, New York
- Glenstone, Potomac, Maryland
- Hammer Museum, Los Angeles, California
- Henry Art Gallery, Seattle, Washington
- Hirshhorn Museum and Sculpture Garden, Washington, D.C.
- Honolulu Museum of Art Spalding House, Honolulu, Hawaii
- Institute of Contemporary Art, Boston, Boston, Massachusetts
- Institute of Contemporary Art, Los Angeles, Los Angeles, California
- Institute of Contemporary Art, Miami, Miami, Florida
- Institute of Contemporary Art, Philadelphia, Philadelphia, Pennsylvania
- Kemper Museum of Contemporary Art, Kansas City, Missouri
- KMAC Museum, Louisville, Kentucky
- Madison Museum of Contemporary Art, Madison, Wisconsin
- Mattress Factory, Pittsburgh, Pennsylvania
- Massachusetts Museum of Contemporary Art, North Adams, Massachusetts
- Modern Art Museum of Fort Worth, Fort Worth, Texas
- Museum of Contemporary Art, Chicago, Chicago, Illinois
- Museum of Contemporary Art, Cleveland, Cleveland, Ohio
- Museum of Contemporary Art Denver, Denver, Colorado
- Museum of Contemporary Art Detroit, Detroit, Michigan
- Museum of Contemporary Art of Georgia, Atlanta, Georgia
- Museum of Contemporary Art Jacksonville, Jacksonville, Florida
- Museum of Contemporary Art, Los Angeles, Los Angeles, California
- Museum of Contemporary Art, North Miami, Miami, Florida
- Museum of Contemporary Art, San Diego, San Diego, California
- Museum of Contemporary Art, Tucson, Tucson, Arizona
- Museum of Modern Art, New York City, New York
- Nerman Museum of Contemporary Art, Overland Park, Kansas
- New Museum of Contemporary Art, New York City, New York
- Orange County Museum of Art, Newport Beach, California
- Pérez Art Museum Miami, Miami, Florida
- P.S. 1 Contemporary Art Center, New York City, New York
- The Renaissance Society, Chicago, Illinois
- Rose Art Museum, Waltham, Massachusetts
- Rubell Museum, Miami, Florida
- Rubell Museum DC, Washington, D.C.
- San Francisco Museum of Modern Art, San Francisco, California
- San Jose Institute of Contemporary Art, San Jose California
- Solomon R. Guggenheim Museum, New York City, New York
- SCAD Museum of Art, Savannah, Georgia
- Scottsdale Museum of Contemporary Art, Scottsdale, Arizona
- SITE Santa Fe, Santa Fe, New Mexico
- Southeastern Center for Contemporary Art, Winston-Salem, North Carolina
- Station Museum of Contemporary Art, Houston, Texas
- Storm King Art Center, New Windsor, New York
- The Contemporary Austin, Austin, Texas
- University Museum of Contemporary Art, Amherst, Massachusetts
- Utah Museum of Contemporary Art, Salt Lake City, Utah
- Virginia Museum of Contemporary Art, Virginia Beach, Virginia
- Walker Art Center, Minneapolis, Minnesota
- Weisman Art Museum, Minneapolis, Minnesota
- Whitney Museum of American Art, New York City, New York
