= Contemporary Art Museum =

Contemporary Art Museum may refer to:

- A museum whose emphasis is primarily or exclusively dedicated to Contemporary art

Specific institutions include:

- Chateau de Montsoreau-Museum of Contemporary Art, Montsoreau Loire Valley, France.
- The Aldrich Contemporary Art Museum, Ridgefield, Connecticut, United States
- ART4.RU Contemporary Art Museum, Moscow, Russia
- Blue Star Contemporary Art Museum, San Antonio, Texas, United States
- Contemporary Art Museum of Raleigh, Raleigh, North Carolina, United States
- Contemporary Art Museum St. Louis, St. Louis, Missouri, United States
- Istanbul Contemporary Art Museum, Istanbul, Turkey
- Niterói Contemporary Art Museum, Niterói, Brazil

== See also ==
- Contemporary Arts Museum Houston
- Museum of Contemporary Art (disambiguation)
- List of contemporary art museums
