= Garanti Gallery =

Defunct Turkish design gallery

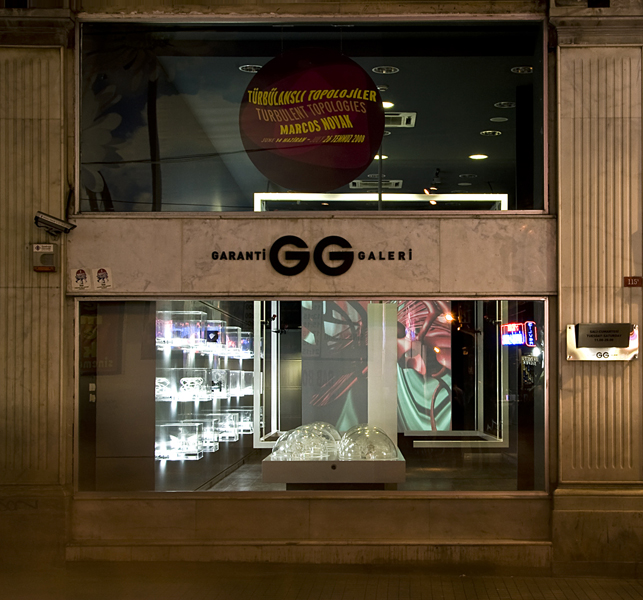
Garanti Gallery (Photo: Laleper Aytek)

Garanti Gallery (GG) was a cultural institution based in Istanbul, Turkey, specializing in design, architecture and urbanism. Through its various exhibitions, lectures, conferences, workshops and publications, GG filled a great gap regarding its areas of expertise in the city and the country in general. GG was the first venue in Turkey to host the exhibitions of works by internationally renowned architects and designers such as Steven Holl, Zaha Hadid, Archigram, Hella Jongerius, Konstantin Grcic, Ezri Tarazi, and Yossi Lemel.

== History ==
GG was founded in 2003 with the support of Garanti Bank. Until August 2008, it organized thirty-one exhibitions at its 70m2 gallery on Istiklal Avenue. Throughout its active period, its programs were shaped by the contribution of an advisory committee made up of Bülent Tanju, UğurTanyeli, Han Tümertekin, Alpay Er, Semra Öndeş and honorary members Bülent Erkmen and Sibel Asna. GG was directed by Münevver Eminoğlu (2003–2005) and Pelin Derviş (2005–2010). In 2010, GG merged with Platform Garanti Contemporary Art Center and the Ottoman Bank Archives and Research Centre (OBARC) under the auspices of Garanti Kültür AŞ to form a new institution – SALT.

== Exhibitions, Events, Workshops ==
The exhibitions at GG aimed to explore all types of design and to open them to discussion. The exhibition entitled Wearing Architecture Inside Out, Rural Studio: Architecture as Transgression and Ambiguity questioned the concept of social responsibility in architecture by focusing on the experiences the students of Auburn University participating in the applied architecture workshop “Rural Studio” had with their “clients” living well below the poverty line in Hale County, Alabama. Curated by Aykut Köksal, the exhibition entitled Soundspace: Spatial Works in Contemporary Music showcased examples of spatial music produced after the 1950s, accompanied by drawings, texts, video recordings of performances and video works based on these compositions. As part of this exhibition, a concert of spatial music works was organized, a first in Turkey. In another project GG cooperated with OBARC to depict in two exhibitions and a book the intellectual and architectural journey of Turgut Cansever, one of the most original and dissident architects of Republic Era Turkey. Directed by Uğur Tanyeli and Atilla Yücel, this project was the first retrospective exhibition of an architect based on archival documents.

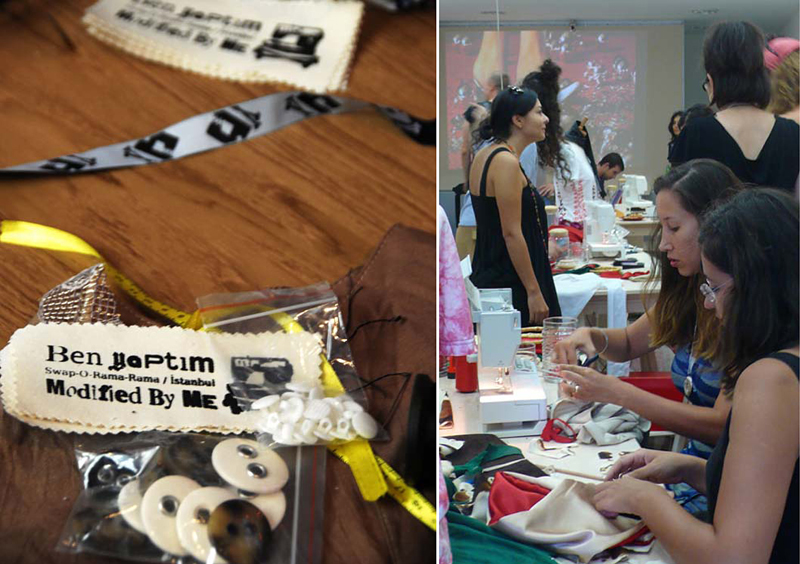
HHCH: Subconstructive Strategies in the Fashion System (Photo: Laleper Aytek)

The range of topics GG opened up for debate in the area of design included the digital world. Project MUTEN Istanbul exhibited the urban design proposed by KOL/MAC, one of the leaders of digital architecture, for the Galataport area. Based on network intelligence and strategies, this design was a different and productive scenario that displayed the contradictions and vicious circles in the ongoing debates concerning the area. Following Project MUTEN, the number of experimental works at GG increased and their content became more varied. As one of the stages of the long-term project Fibrous Structures directed by Claudia Pasquero, Marco Poletto and Nilüfer Kozikoğlu, Fibrous Room; Evolving Structural Logic exhibited not the design product per se but rather a phase in the design research process. The life-size prototype made of woven hollow fibers developed in time as the fibers were filled with concrete one month later and as the concrete then solidified. Curated and designed by Marcos Novak, the exhibition entitled Turbulent Topologies dealt with turbulence as a formal principle and a condition of the global metropolis. Novak examined the turbulent topologies of currents, links, connections, networks and stratifications by using high-tech fragile statues and a virtual environment that the bodies of visitors turned into physical sound and images. After the exhibition in Istanbul, Turbulent Topologies was exhibited at Palazzetto Tito (Fondazione Bevilacqua La Masa, 2008) concurrently with the 11th Venice Architecture Biennial and at IVAM (Institut Valencià d'Art Modern, 2009) as part of Confines, a retrospective curated by Aaron Betsky.

GG supported the content of all exhibitions with lectures, conferences, panel discussions and workshops, thereby aiming to create an environment of discussion and production. The most radical example of this was Hackers and Haute Couture Heretics: Subconstructive Strategies in the Fashion System. Curated by Otto von Busch, the exhibition examined how the processes of hacking, shopdropping and craftivism were used as tactics at the outskirts of fashion. Throughout the six-week period while the exhibition was open, Busch held workshops with artists and designers who proposed new work methods within the fashion system. The aim of the workshops was to create a variety of practical low-level interventions and perspectives from which to look upon fashion both as a phenomenon as well as a material that can be transformed.

Becoming Istanbul is one of the long-term research and publication projects begun by GG to discuss the method of exhibition as part of the exhibition content itself, and has now been passed on to SALT. For the purposes of the exhibition, an interactive database has been constructed to help defy the received wisdom and clichés that accompany the debates on change and transformation that have been going on in Istanbul for a long time. The database included artist videos, photography series, architectural projects, TV news items and cartoons reflecting the current state of the city, and was projected onto the walls of the exhibition space, allowing each user to browse the database by using a mouse connected to the system. Becoming Istanbul was exhibited at the German Architecture Museum (DAM, 2008) in Frankfurt, Deutsches Architektur Zentrum (DAZ, 2009) in Berlin and Al Riwaq Gallery (Bahrain, 2009) in Al Manama. Curators of the exhibition, Pelin Derviş, Bülent Tanju and Uğur Tanyeli, edited the multi-authored dictionary Becoming Istanbul, which was published in English and German in 2008. The book was published in Turkish in 2009 under the title İstanbullaşmak: Olgular, Sorunsallar, Metaforlar. The same year saw the publication of Tracing Istanbul [from the air], a book made up of interviews based on aerial photographs by Oğuz Meriç and edited by Meriç Öner, as well as Mapping Istanbul, which was edited by Pelin Derviş and Meriç Öner and brought together the views and research of numerous academics and experts through maps, diagrams and texts. The exhibition can be visited at SALT Beyoğlu between September and December 2011. The online version of the interactive database can be accessed at http://database.becomingistanbul.org.

== Publications ==
Between 2005 and 2010, GG published exhibition yearbooks as well as various books related to exhibitions and other projects.

GG 2003-2004, Garanti Gallery 2005, Istanbul, ISBN 978-975-93692-9-3

GG 2005, Garanti Gallery 2006, Istanbul, ISBN 978-975-98125-7-7

GG 2006, Garanti Gallery 2007, Istanbul, ISBN 978-9944-5518-5-4

GG 2007-2008, Garanti Gallery 2009, Istanbul,ISBN 978-9944-73-110-2

Turgut Cansever Düşünce Adamı ve Mimar, Uğur Tanyeli, Atilla Yücel, Ottoman Bank Archives and Research Center and Garanti Gallery 2007, Istanbul, ISBN 978-9944-5518-3-0

Mimarlığın Aktörleri Türkiye 1900-2000, Uğur Tanyeli, Garanti Gallery 2007, Istanbul, ISBN 978-9944-5518-4-7

Becoming Istanbul: An Encyclopedia, Edited by Pelin Derviş, Bülent Tanju, Uğur Tanyeli, Garanti Gallery 2008, Istanbul, ISBN 978-9944-73-106-5

Becoming Istanbul: Eine Enzyklopadie, Edited by Pelin Derviş, Bülent Tanju, Uğur Tanyeli, Garanti Gallery 2008, Istanbul ISBN 978-9944-73-107-2

İstanbullaşmak: Olgular, Sorunsallar, Metaforlar, Edited by Pelin Derviş, Bülent Tanju, Uğur Tanyeli, Garanti Gallery 2009, Istanbul, ISBN 978-9944-73-111-9

Tracing Istanbul (from the air), Photography: Oğuz Meriç, Edited by Meriç Öner, Garanti Gallery 2009, Istanbul, ISBN 978-9944-73-115-7

Mapping Istanbul, Edited by Pelin Derviş, Meriç Öner, Map design: Superpool, Garanti Gallery 2009, Istanbul, ISBN 978-9944-73-116-4

ISTANBUL PARA-DOXA / Conversations on the City and Architecture, Boğaçhan Dündaralp, Aslı Kıyak İngin, Nilüfer Kozikoğlu, Edited by Pelin Derviş, Garanti Gallery 2010, Istanbul, ISBN 978-9944-73-121-8

== Transdisciplines Lecture Series ==
GG organized a 12-session “Transdisciplines Lecture Series” in collaboration with Platform Garanti in 2008 and 2009. The lectures aimed to open to discussion the production environment that would transcend disciplines as envisioned by the new institution to be formed by GG and Platform Garanti while the process of unification and change undertaken by these two entities still continued. Lecturers in chronological order were Marcos Novak, Marie-Ange Brayer, Peter Taylor, Fiona Raby of Dunne & Raby, George Legrady, Hans Ulrich Obrist, Charles Waldheim, Nikolaus Hirsch, Peter Cook, Gijs van Oenen, Ciro Najle and Trevor Paglen.

== Architecture and Design Archive Turkey ==
Architecture and Design Archive Turkey (ADAT) became active in 2008 under the direction of the historian of modern design in Turkey Gökhan Karakuş as the joint project of GG and Platform Garanti, with the aim of demonstrating the historical development in the fields of architecture and design in Turkey. ADAT treats architecture and design as two main factors that complete each other, and as two separate denominators of a shared practice. Archival work followed two different research methodologies in the fields of architecture and design. Architectural research began with the “senior architects” in Turkey including Cengiz Bektaş, Utarit İzgi, Turgut Cansever, Sedad Hakkı Eldem and Kemali Söylemezoğlu. The personal archives of the architects were digitized and catalogued, and became part of ADAT. A chronological approach was organized in the field of design history in Turkey by Archive Curator Karakuş with images from the personal and institutional archives belonging to a number of important Turkish designers including the KareMetal Group of the 1950s, the Koz family (MPD), Yıldırım Kocacıklıoğlu (INTERNO), ceramicist Sadi Diren, Gorbon ceramics, Aziz Sarıyer (Derin) and Yılmaz Zenger that were digitalized and catalogued. During the three initial years of active research, ADAT collected over 20,000 digital images and more than 4000 physical material. Since 2010, ADAT continues its activities as a part of SALT Research.

== Library ==
In 2007, GG began to expand the modest library it had formed with the purpose of aiding the research necessary for its exhibitions and events. In 2008 it merged with the library of Platform Garanti Contemporary Art Center. A serious and research-based investment is now under way to include the canonical and most recent publications of a great variety of disciplines that will contribute to the fields of architecture, design and urban planning. The library's holdings open to the public at SALT Research on November 22, 2011.
