= Genco Gulan =

Turkish contemporary artist (born 1969)

Genco Gülan
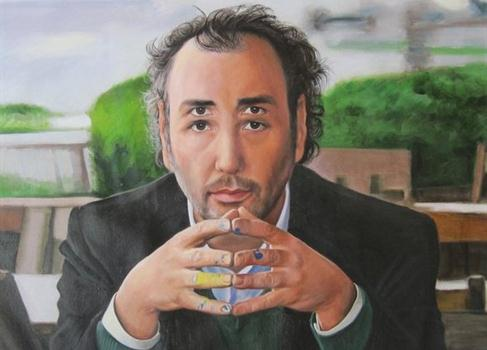
- Self-portrait of Gülan
- Born: 13 January 1969 (age 57); Istanbul, Turkey
- Education: The New School
- Known for: Contemporary art, painting, sculpture
- Movement: Idea art, Post-Dada
- Website: gencogulan.com

Genco Gülan (born 13 January, 1969) is a Turkish conceptual artist and art theorist whose work spans new media art, performance art, sculpture, painting, and photography.

His art explores the intersection of technology, identity, and communication. Gülan studied media and communication at The New School in New York City and has exhibited his work internationally. He incorporates digital aesthetics, artificial intelligence, and interdisciplinary theory into his practice. His work has been shown at institutions including the Pera Museum, Museum of Modern Art in Rio de Janeiro, ZKM Karlsruhe, Triennale di Milano, the Tehran Biennial, and the Centre Pompidou in Paris. In addition to his artistic practice, Gülan has lectured on contemporary art and founded the Istanbul Contemporary Art Museum as an independent art project.

== Career ==
Genco Gülan began his career in the early 1990s, producing conceptual and media-based works that explore artificial intelligence, gender, politics, and digital culture. In 1997, he founded the Istanbul Contemporary Art Museum as an independent, experimental art initiative. The project blends institutional critique with participatory models of curating and archiving.

His work has been exhibited internationally at a range of museums, biennials, and art spaces. Notable institutions that have featured his work include the Pera Museum (Istanbul), Museum of Modern Art in Rio de Janeiro, ZKM Karlsruhe, Triennale di Milano, the Tehran Biennial, and the Centre Pompidou (Paris).

Gülan has presented solo exhibitions at Gallery Arts in Berlin and Istanbul, the State Art and Sculpture Museum in Ankara, the İzmir Painting and Sculpture Museum, Foto Gallery Lang in Zagreb, and Artda Gallery in Seoul. His multidisciplinary works have included kinetic sculptures, installations, digital avatars, and experimental performance. In addition to exhibiting his work, Gülan has written extensively on contemporary art theory and has lectured at universities and institutions across Europe and Turkey. He continues to curate, teach, and exhibit both online and in physical venues.

== Art style ==
Gülan is a new media artist who uses text, codes, and DNA in his art. In a video piece called Tele-rugby, he filmed a female swim team playing rugby underwater with a TV monitor.

His works include net art, web art, AI-generated images, Robot Games, SCIgen papers, and online videos. Gülan uses boron in his sculptures.

== Works ==
The Android Statue and sketches of Gülan's kinetic marble statue series, Robotic Statues, were presented at the Antalya Museum in 2014. Gülan's work with robots in university labs since the mid-1990s. His artwork Robots, Football and War (RFW) was part of the computer game Balkan Wars, which won an award at the European Media Art Festival in Osnabrück in 1995. His AI-generated play was used in the project YEN! (New) presented at the Pera Museum for the 16th Istanbul Theatre Festival.

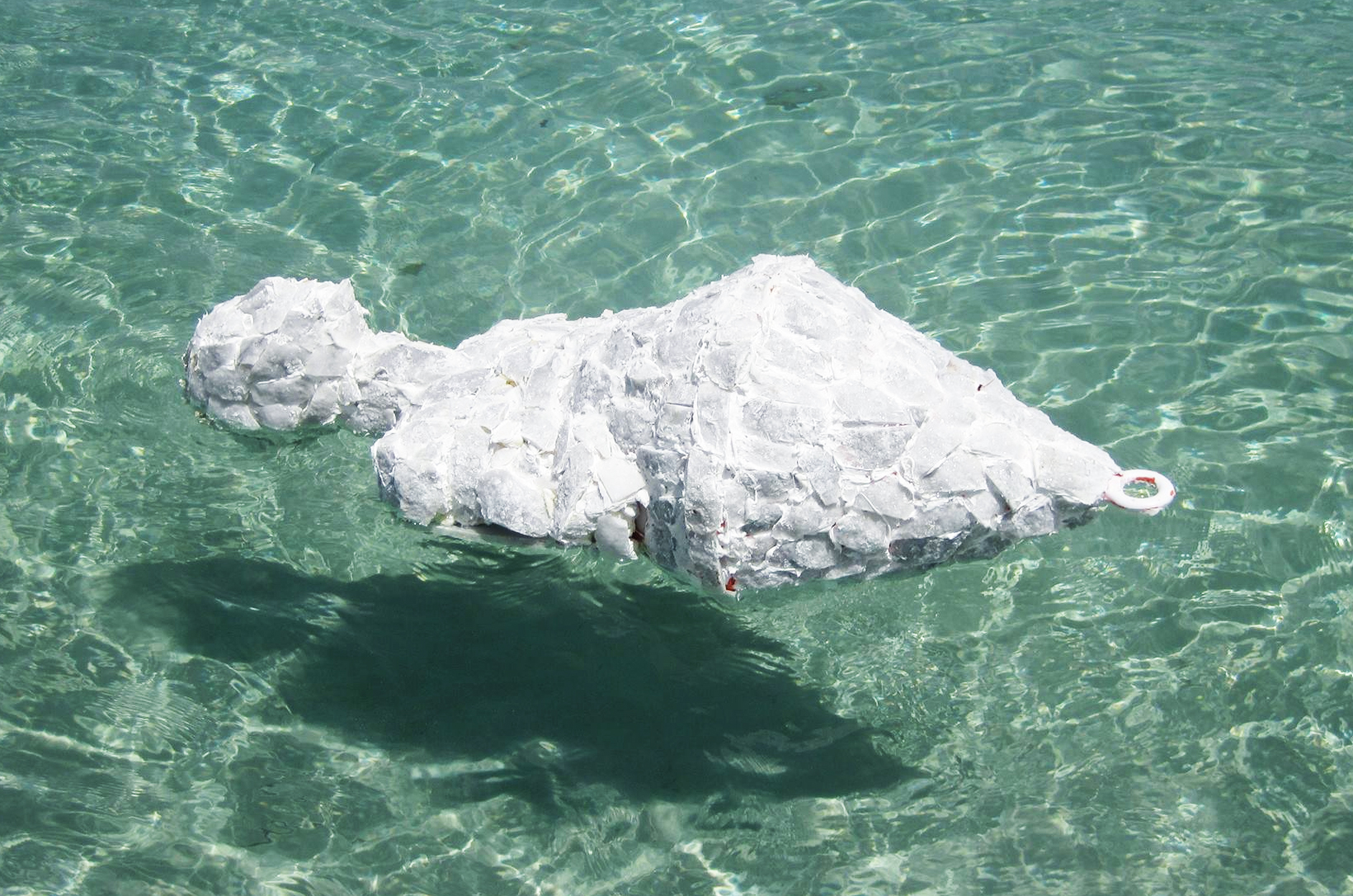
Swimming Rocks, Çeşme, Alaçatı

The Great Conjugation was exhibited at Boğaziçi University's Faculty of Economics and Administrative Sciences building, Washburn Hall, in 2014. The installation used approximately 1,000 ties to create a route spanning the five floors of the building.

The installation was also displayed at the Thessaloniki State Museum of Contemporary Art and the Ankara Contemporary Art Center in 2013. In 2011, Gülan was a finalist for the Sovereign Art Foundation European Art Prize and held his first exhibition at the White Saloon inside the Faculty of Economics and Administrative Sciences building, where he studied political science and international relations from 1987 to 1991.

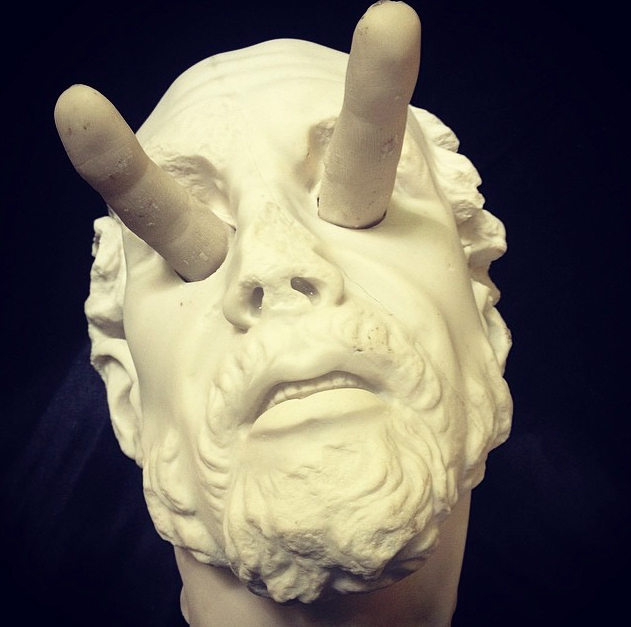
Karate, 2014, 25×20×20 cm

An exhibition titled Swimming Rocks was held in 2014 at Gallery Metazori in Çeşme, Alaçatı. The work was inspired by pumice rocks in the Aegean Sea around Çeşme and Alaçatı. Works by his mother, Tezer Gülan, and his grandmother, Saime İzmiroğlu, were also featured in the exhibition. Gülan presented his New Landscape series and Digital Ghost series.

== Istanbul Contemporary Art Museum ==
Gülan established the Istanbul Contemporary Art Museum as an art project in 1997.

"At first the Istanbul Contemporary Art Museum developed as an art series in the manner of Duchamp and Broodthaers until the end of the 1990s. Later it evolved when it was transferred to the Internet. It turned into a new age institution that organized exhibitions, workshops and provided logistic support on cyber space."

The museum ran a residency program called "I live in a Museum" and hosted artists from the U.S., the Netherlands, Spain, and China at its Galata location.

Gülan's monograph, Conceptual Colors of Genco Gülan, edited by Marcus Graf, is co-published by Revolver Publishing, Berlin in collaboration with Galeri Artist, Istanbul. His publications are available at the German National Library, SALT Research, the Thomas J. Watson Library at the Metropolitan Museum of Art, and the Robert B. Haas Family Arts Library at Yale University.

Gülan founded the Web Biennial and has served on the Board of the Balkan Biennial in Thessaloniki, and the International Programming Committee of ISEA Singapore in 2008. He was a guest editor for Second Nature: International Journal of Creative Media. He was on the jury for the Turgut Pura Art Prize in Izmir and teaches at Mimar Sinan Academy and Boğaziçi University.

== Selected images ==
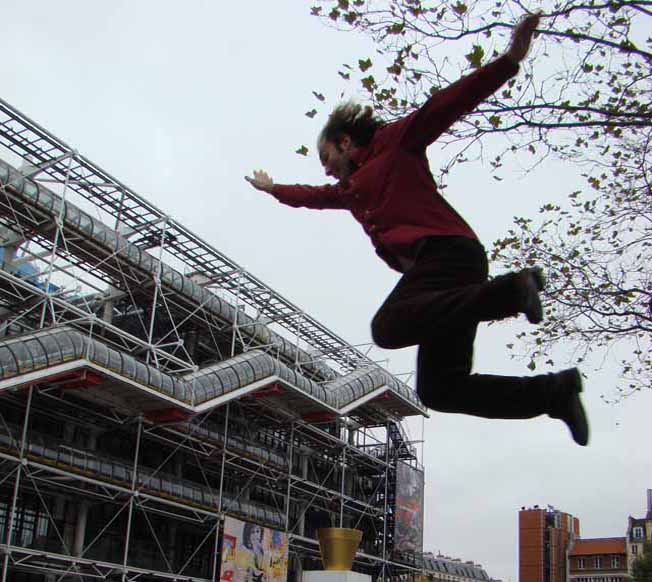
Pompidou, From the "I love You series,” C-print, Paris, 2007

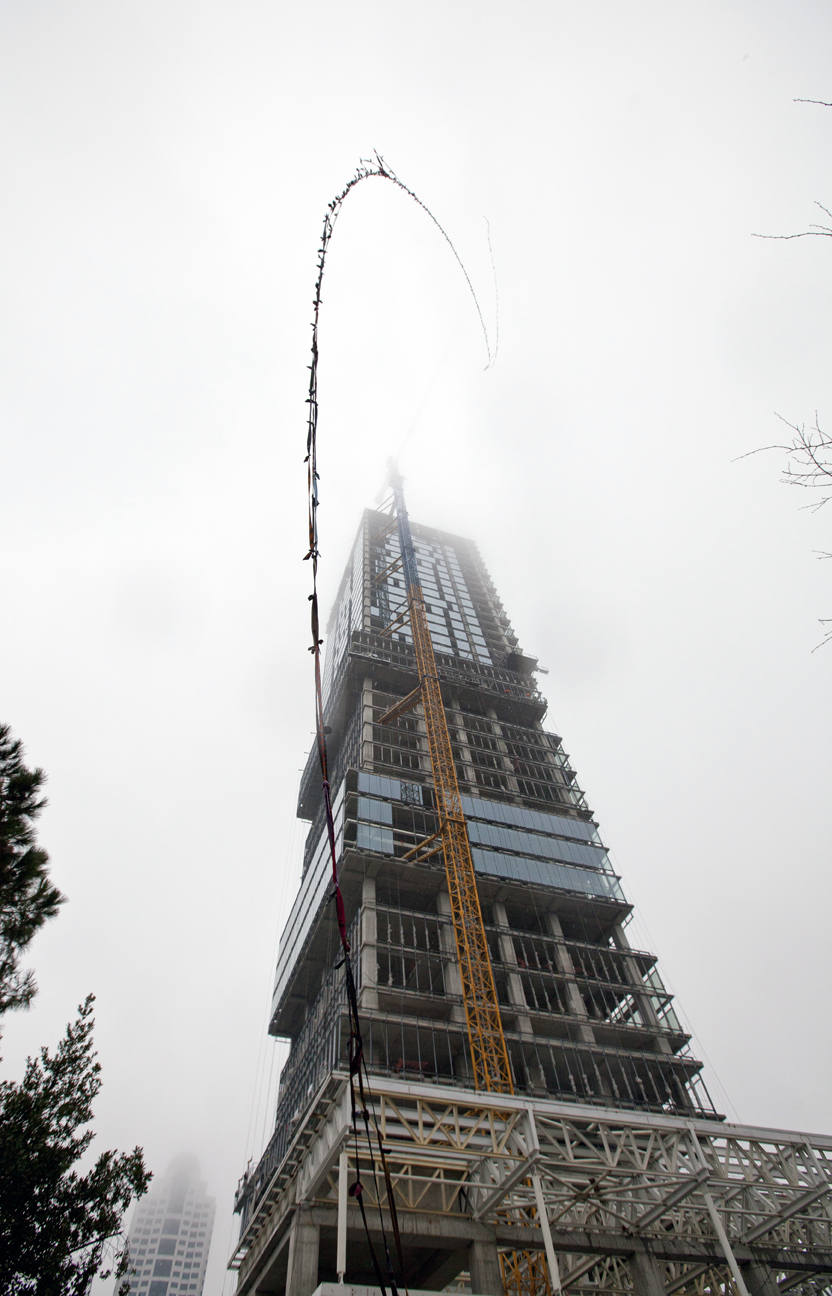
“Magic Beans” 2013. Sculpture with 600 used neckties and a crane, 150m.

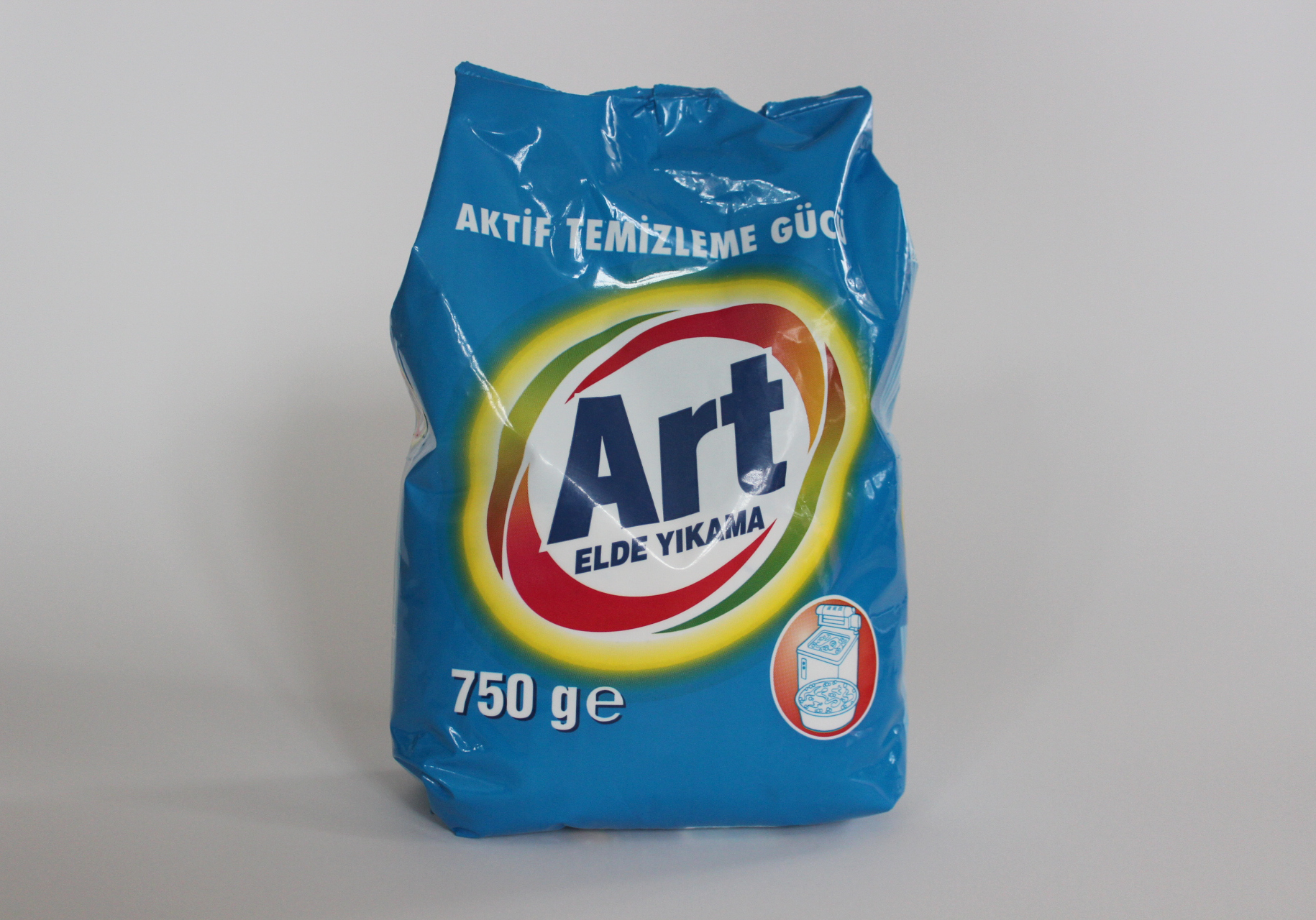
Art (Blue), ready-made, 2013.

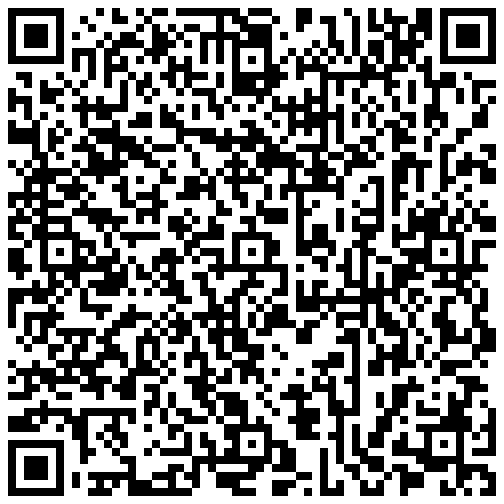
33.3 QR Code poem

== Bibliography ==
- Marcus Graf. Conceptual Colors of Genco Gülan, Revolver Publishing, 2012. ISBN 978-3868952049
- Marcus Graf. Genco Gülan: Kavramsal Renkler, Galata Perform Publishing, 2008. ISBN 9789944016001
- Genco Gülan. Portrait of the Artist as the Young Man: (After James Joyce) CreateSpace Independent Publishing Platform, 2013. ISBN 978-1481942423
- Genco Gülan. De-constructing the Digital Revolution: Analysis of the Usage of the Term "Digital Revolution" in Relation with the New Technology, LAP Lambert Academic Publishing (12 November 2009). ISBN 978-3838320472
