= List of museums in Panama =

This is a list of museums in Panama.

Name	Location	Type	Summary
Afro-Antillean Museum	Panama City	Culture	information, history and culture of the West Indian workers for the building of the Panama Canal
Biomuseo	Panama City	Natural history	
Belisario Porras Museum	Las Tablas	Biographical	information, life of politician Belisario Porras Barahona
Bolivar Museum	Panama City	History	
National Bank of Panama House Museum	Panama City	Numismatic	website, information, operated by National Bank of Panama.
El Pausilipo Museum	Las Tablas	History	
Manuel F. Zarate Museum	Guararé	Culture	information, folklore and clothing
Marine Exhibition Center of Punta Culebra	Panama City	Natural history	Nature center with aquariums
Stella Sierra Regional Museum of Aguadulce	Aguadulce	History	information, formerly the Salt and Sugar Museum, local history, salt and sugar industries
Museum of Contemporary Art	Panama City	Art	website
Museum of History	Panama City	History	
Nationality Museum	La Villa de Los Santos		
Natural Sciences Museum	Panama City	Natural history	information, stuffed and mounted animals, rocks and minerals. (Currently closed for renovations)
José de Obaldía Museum of History and Art	David	History and Art	Closed
Panama Canal Museum	Panama City	History	History of the construction of the Panama Canal
Penonomé Museum	Penonomé	History and Culture	
Portobelo Royal Customs House Museum	Portobelo	History	
Reina Torres de Araúz Anthropological Museum	Panama City	Anthropology	information, archaeological and ethnographic artifacts (Closed in 2013; reopening not expected before 2021.)
Religious Art Museum	Panama City	Art	
Ricardo J. Alfaro Museum	Panama City	Biographical	

== See also ==
- List of museums by country
