= Idea art =

Art form

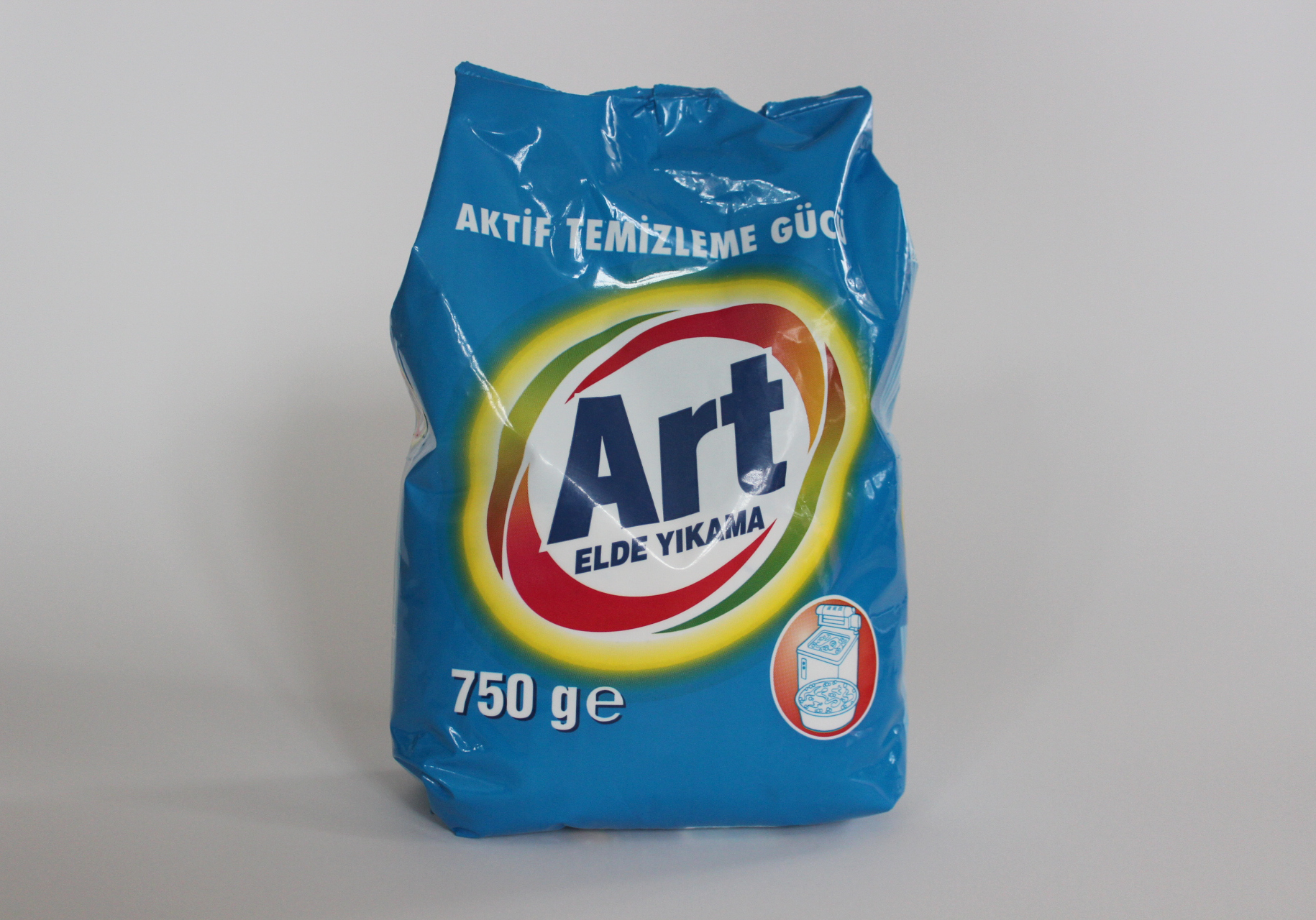
Genco Gulan, Art (Blue) (2013)

Idea art is an art form in which small individual ideas take precedence over grand concepts or ideologies and generic aesthetic, material and disciplinary concerns. The artist works not only like an architect or an engineer, as in the case of conceptual art, but also like a curator or an art writer.

Works of idea art may be in any medium.

The method was fundamental to Turkish artist Genco Gulan's definition of idea art, one of the first to appear online.

== See also ==
- Contemporary art
- Experiments in Art and Technology
- Found object
- Happening
- Fluxus
- Information art
- Installation art
- Intermedia
- Land art
- Modern art
- Neo-conceptual art
- Net art
- Postmodern art
- Generative Art
- Street installation
- Video art
- Visual arts
- ART/MEDIA
