= Ottoman Bank Archives and Research Centre =

Turkish library and cultural organization

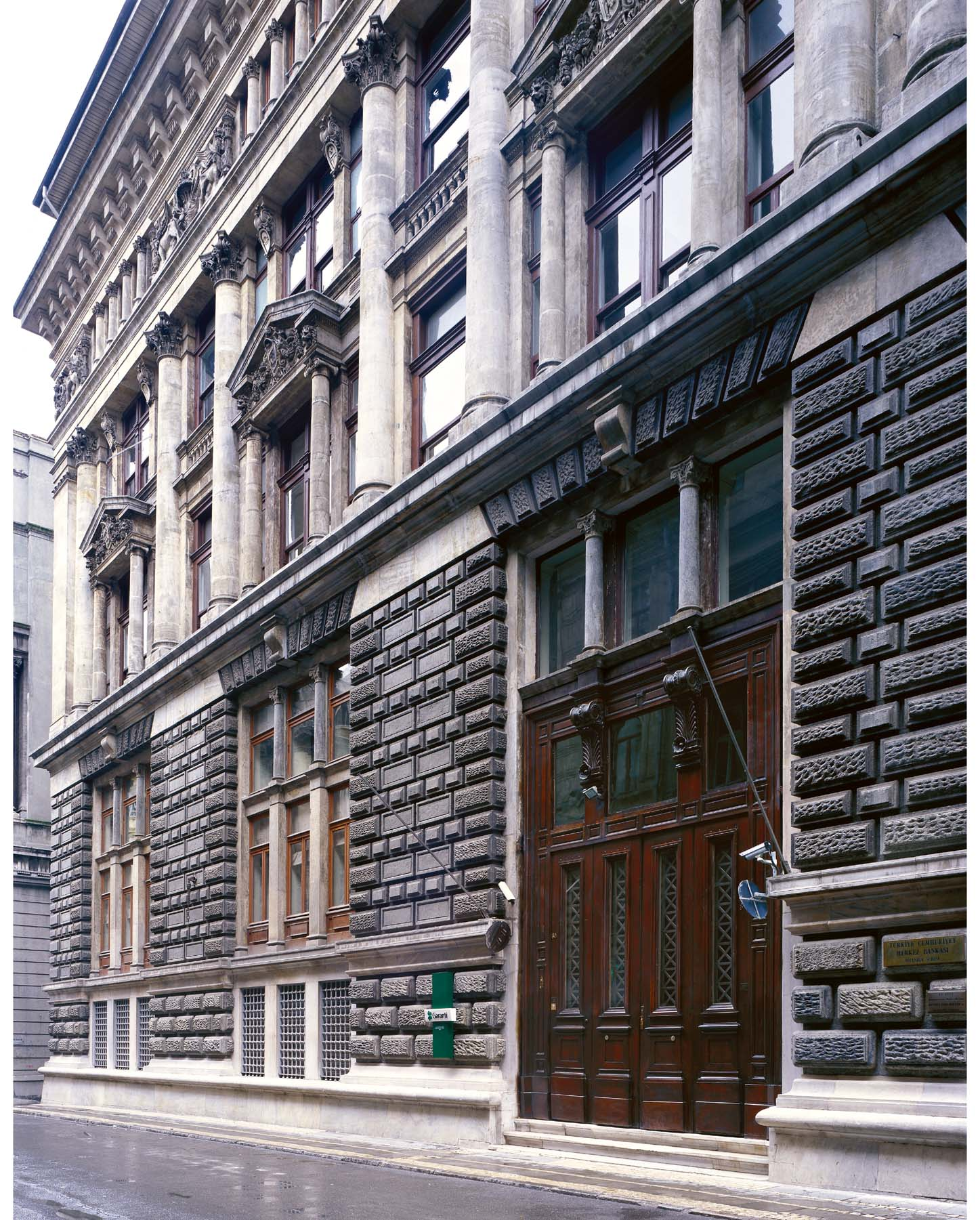
- Ottoman Bank Archives and Research Centre
- Interactive map of Ottoman Bank Archives and Research Centre
- 41.02390808891162°N 28.973574028735587°E
- Alternative name: Osmanlı Bankası Müzesi
- Location: Istanbul, Turkey
- Website: http://www.obmuze.com/#kronolojik

Founded in March 1997 by the Ottoman Bank in collaboration with the History Foundation (Turkish: Tarih Vakfi), the Ottoman Bank Archives and Research Centre (OBARC) operated in the former Head Office of the Ottoman Bank in Istanbul, Turkey from 1999 to 2010. Its projects included 400 conferences, symposia, workshops and exhibitions; as well as 70 publications and a bi-annual prize competition.

== History ==
Following the Ottoman Bank/Garanti Bank merger on December 16, 2001, OBARC continued under the aegis of Garanti Bank. To display the materials in the archives and promote research around political, economic, social and cultural history, OBARC established the Ottoman Bank Museum in 2002.

In 2011, building upon the activities and resources of OBARC and Garanti's two other cultural institutions, Platform Garanti Contemporary Art Center and Garanti Gallery – all of which have been dissolved - a new institution, SALT, was established. Founded by Garanti Bank, SALT is a public company operating under Garanti Culture Inc.

== Lectures and Workshops ==
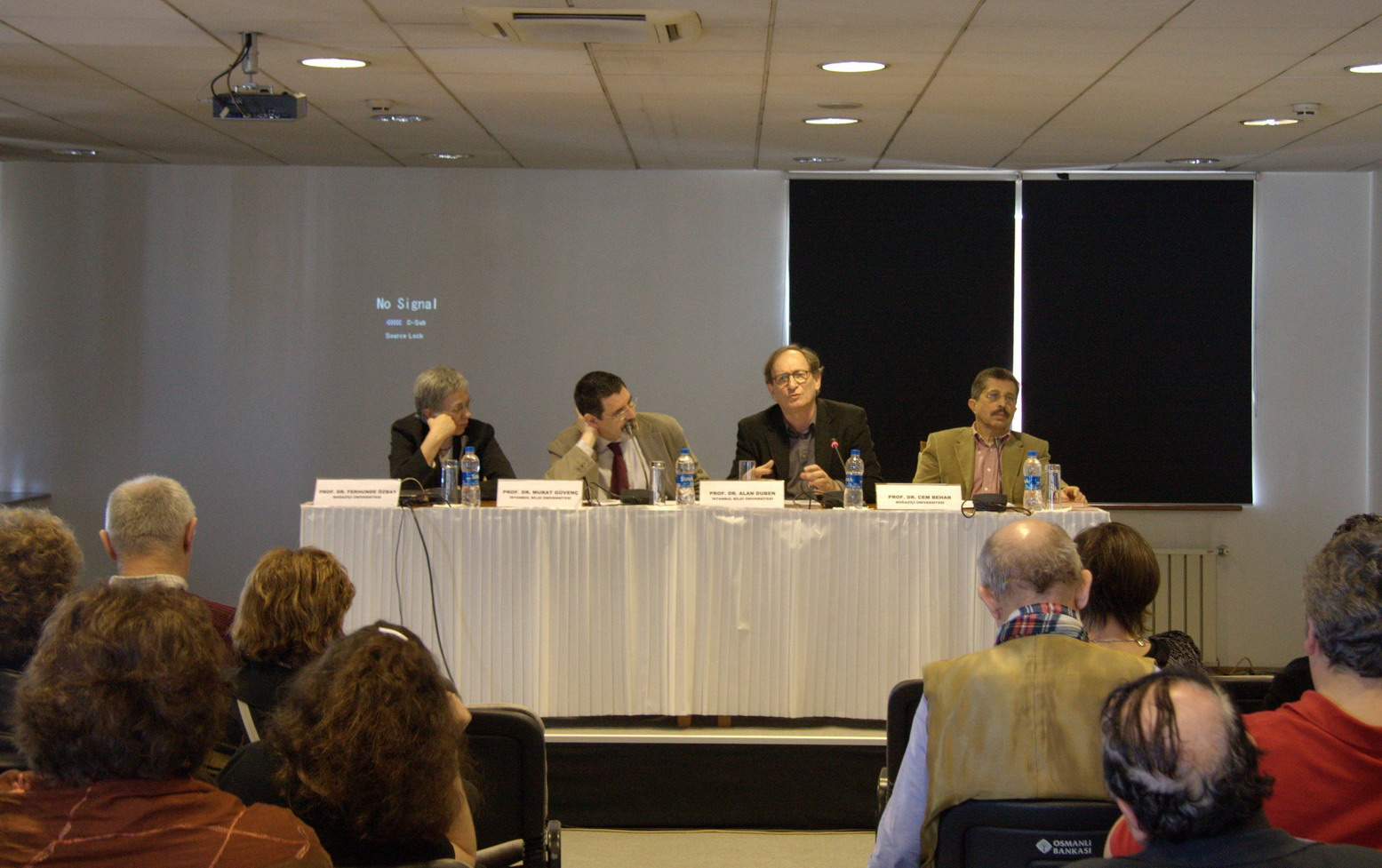
"Old Istanbulites, New Istanbulites" Symposium, 2009

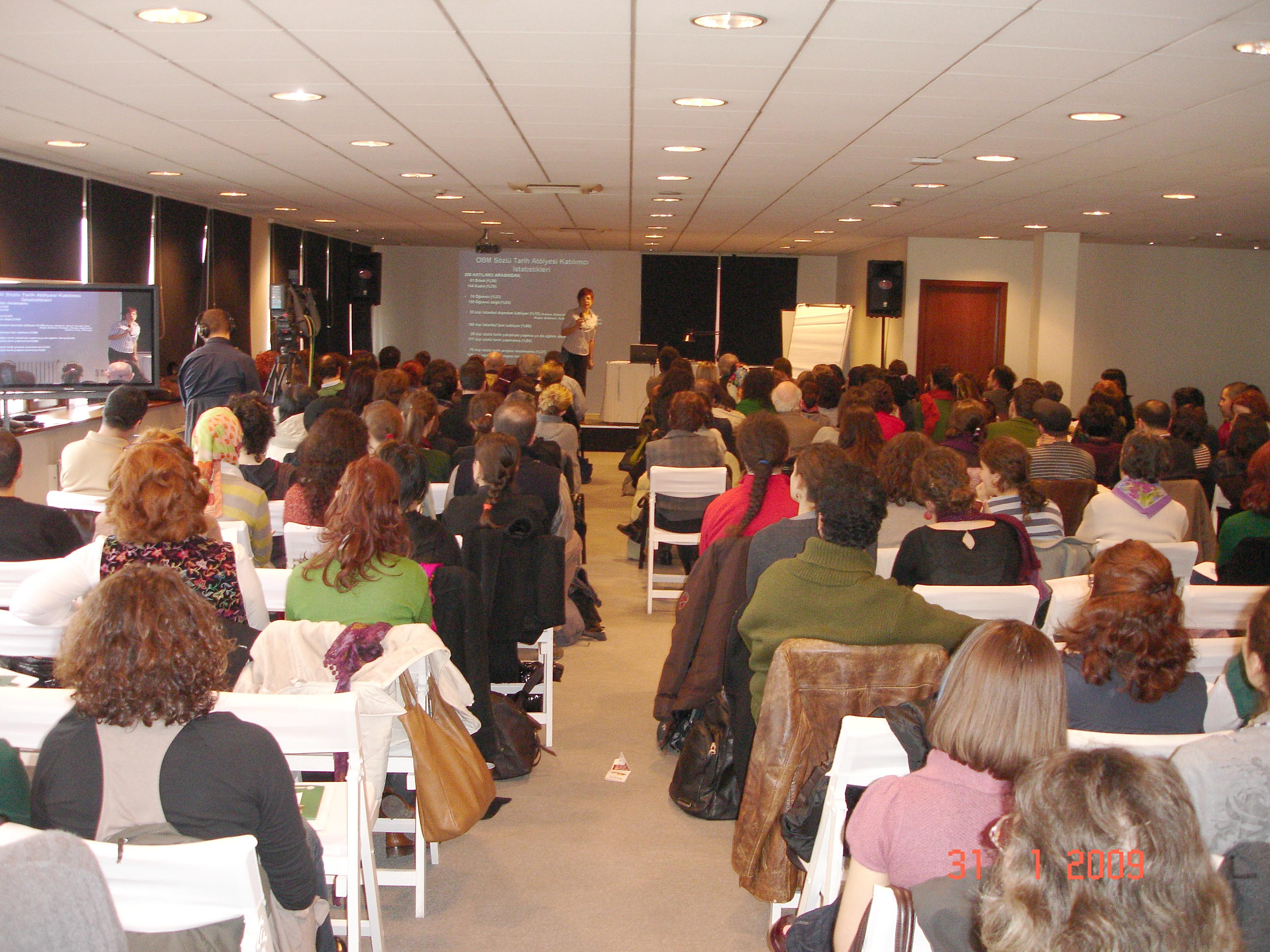
Oral History Workshop, 2009

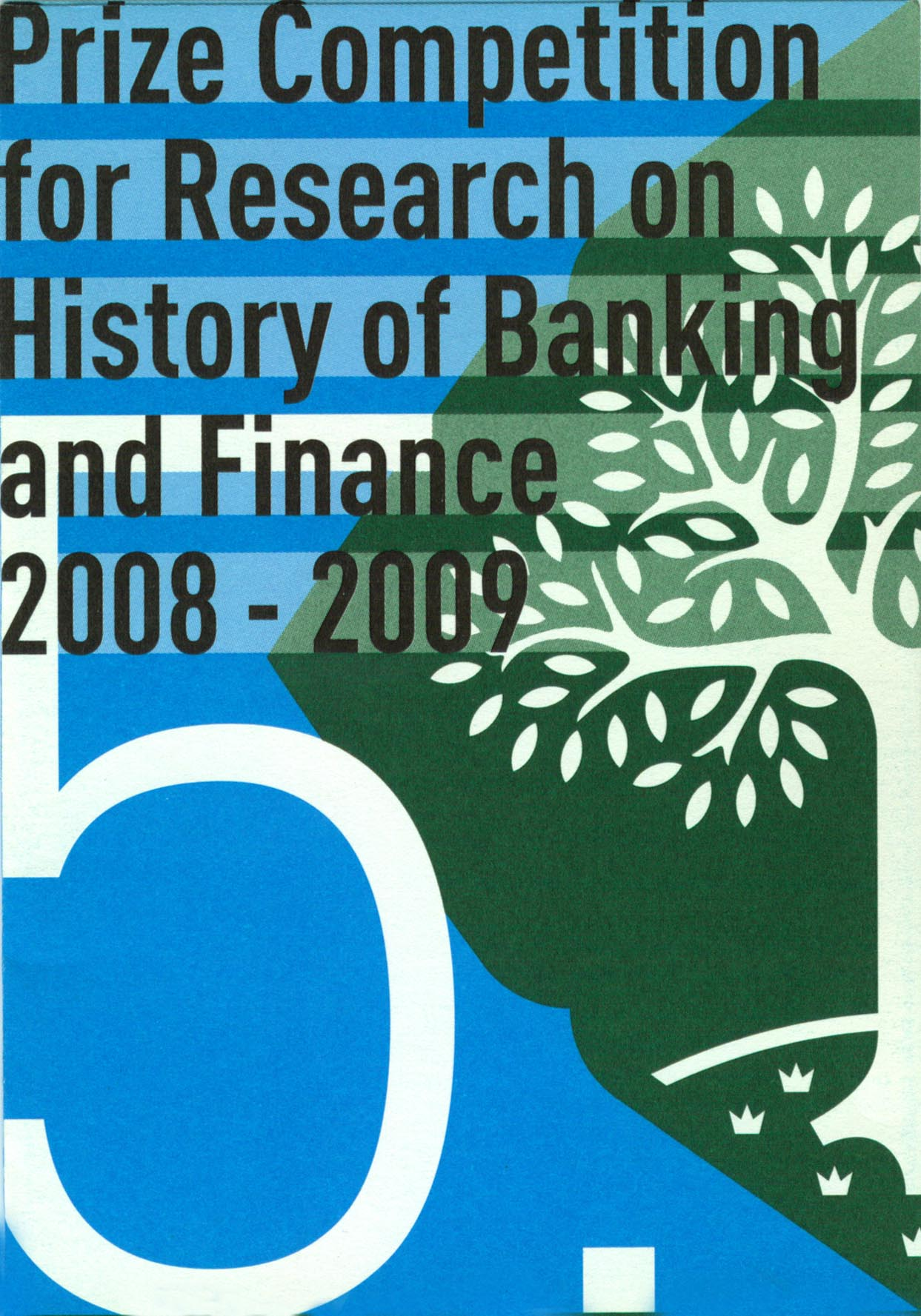
Prize Competition for Research on the History of Banking and Finance

OBARC's lectures, seminars, symposia, workshops and prize competitions, whose related publications and texts will be made available via SALT Research, are summarized below:

Voyvoda Street Lectures

Beginning in 2000–2001, the Voyvoda Street Lecture series provided academics, students and members of the community an avenue to discuss issues regarding economic history, culture, archaeology, literature and other relevant topics in relation to Istanbul, as well as other urban centers.

Symposia

The Enlightenment Symposium series consisted of four symposia bringing together expert researchers for scholarly discussion on the Enlightenment. Academics from leading universities in Turkey discussed how Enlightenment philosophy had contributed to locking in place certain social problems in Turkey. Following the first symposium, curated by Prof. Binnaz Toprak in May 2007, a second, "Enlightenment and Modern Law: Contemporary Legal Issues and Law in Turkey," was chaired by Prof. Levent Köker. The objective of this symposium was to examine Turkey's historical experience in establishing a modern system of law based on Enlightenment philosophy, as well as critique this system's fundamental principles and institutions. The third symposium, “The Enlightenment, Turkey and Citizenship,” was curated by Prof. Fuat Keyman and addressed the concept of "citizenship" - both on a theoretical level and in relation to Turkey. The final symposium, during the 2008 financial crisis, was titled "Enlightenment and Economy Symposium," and was chaired by Taner Berksoy.

In 2009, OBARC launched the Istanbul Symposium series, which examined Istanbul within an economic, social and cultural framework. The opening symposium, “Old Istanbulites and New Istanbulites,” was curated by Prof. Murat Güvenç and explored the demographic structure of Istanbul during the process of modernization. Held December 2009 under the curatorship of Prof. Çağlar Keyder. Titled “Economy in Globalizing Istanbul,” the second Istanbul Symposium addressed the ongoing dynamics of globalization, and its effects on the city's economy from the 1990s onwards. The closing symposium, curated by Assist. Prof. İpek Yada Akpınar and advised by Prof. Sibel Bozdoğan, addressed Istanbul's saga of modernization, examining how the architect, the designer, and the city dweller visualized urbanism.

The Making of Modern Turkey Seminars

Between 2003 and 2009, OBARC organized The Making of Modern Turkey Seminars in collaboration with Boğaziçi University. Held every month and moderated by Prof. Zafer Toprak of Boğaziçi University's Atatürk Institute, the series focused on difficulties accompanying the formation of Republican Turkey. Examining Turkey within a political, economic, social and cultural framework, the seminars provided a critical analysis of this period.

Economy and Society on Both Shores of the Aegean Seminars

OBARC hosted a series of monthly seminars from 2004 to 2007, organized in collaboration with Alpha Bank and the History Department at Bogaziçi University. Focusing on the Greek-Orthodox populations during the late Ottoman period and the first decades of the Republic, the seminars addressed issues concerning ethnic and civic identity, inter-communal relations, urban culture, educational policies, commercial activities, social networks, the exchange of populations, and the Patriarchate. To foster discussion among historians from both shores of the Aegean and contribute to international research literature, the papers submitted to the seminars for three consecutive academic years were compiled into a book by Dr. Lorans Tanatar Baruh and Assist. Prof. Vangelis Kechriotis.

Oral History Workshops

In 2009, OBARC organized Oral History Workshops in collaboration with Sabancı University and led by Assoc. Prof. Leyla Neyzi. These workshops investigated the contribution of oral history to the research and understanding of recent Turkish history. After a two-day workshop that addressed the emergence of oral history, its institutionalization, its methodology and ethics, weekly group sessions fostered scholarly oral history projects.

Prize Competition for Research on the History of Banking and Finance

From 2000 to 2009, to encourage academic research in the field of Turkish banking, financial and economic history, OBARC held a bi-annual competition in collaboration with the European Association for Banking and Financial History and the History Foundation. Prize-winning papers were regularly published by OBARC.

== Exhibitions ==
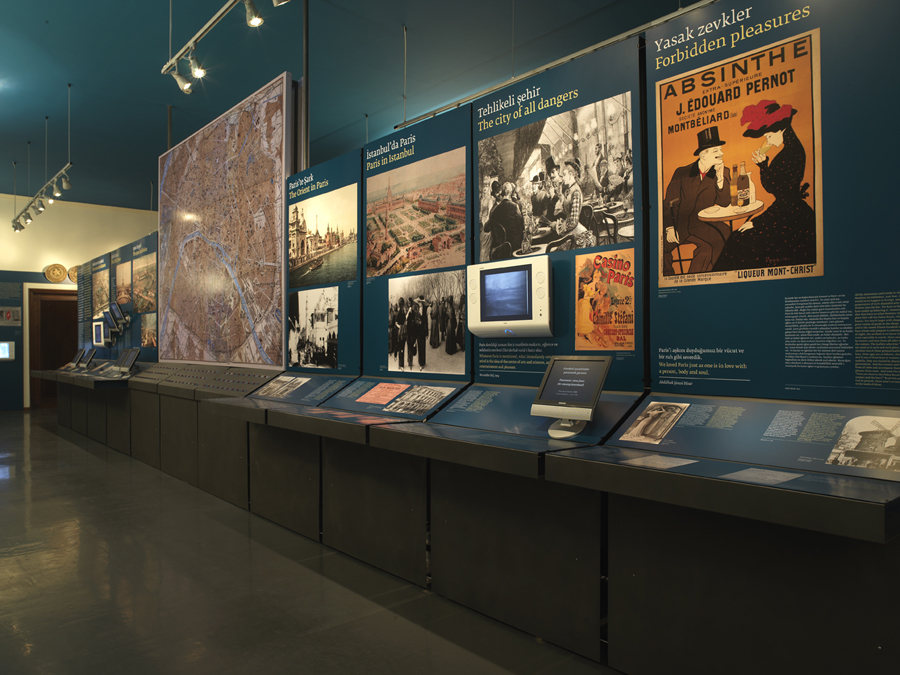
Prelude to the 1908 Revolution: The Ottomans in Paris, 2008

From 1997 to 2009, OBARC organized 16 exhibitions in Istanbul. Select exhibitions include:

Glimpses from the Past, 1997

Glimpses from the Past was OBARC's first exhibition. Examining the Ottoman Bank's relationship to the state, the market and its contemporary society, the exhibition displayed items and documents relating to the foundation of the bank in 1863, bonds and advances it provided for the Ottoman state, the role it played in obtaining foreign credit and the bank notes it issued as an emission bank.

The Voyvoda Street from the Ottoman Periods to Our Days, 2000

This exhibition, curated by Prof. Edhem Eldem and realized in collaboration with the Economic and Social History Foundation of Turkey, examined the transformation of Istanbul's Voyvoda Street (or, Banks Street), the site of the Ottoman Bank's former headquarters. Over a period of three months, in line with the exhibition, visitors viewed the street's facades, read stories about the history of its buildings, and listened to recorded memories of present and former residents.

Pride and Privilege - An Exhibition of Ottoman Orders and Decorations, 2004

After the merger of the Ottoman Bank with Garanti Bank, OBARC exhibitions continued with Pride and Privilege - An Exhibition of Ottoman Orders and Decorations. Curated by Prof. Edhem Eldem and designed by Bülent Erkmen, Pride and Privilege presented a 120-year history of orders and decorations in the Ottoman Empire.

Representations of Lifestyles in Turkey (1980-2005), 2006

Curated by Asst. Prof. Zafer Yenal and Assoc. Prof. Meltem Ahıska, this exhibition tackled issues of Turkey's Republican Period. Organized around seven main headings inspired by popular song lyrics, slogans and common expressions, the exhibition questioned media representations and interpretations of "lifestyle" in Turkey during this period.

Turgut Cansever: Architect and Thinker, 2007

Curated by Prof. Uğur Tanyeli and Assoc. Prof. Bülent Tanju, Turgut Cansever: Architect and Thinker was a two-part exhibition shown at OBARC and Garanti Galeri. Tracing the development of Turkish architect Cansever's constructional and written works, Garanti Galeri focused on Cansever's role as a thinker and public figure, while OBARC examined his architectural works from the 1940s onwards.

Consuming the Orient, 2007

Curated by Prof. Edhem Eldem, this exhibition critiqued images of the Orient created and developed in Western consumer culture from the end of the 19th century onwards. The exhibition was subsequently launched at the Académie des Beaux-Arts in 2010.

Prelude to the 1908 Revolution: The Ottomans in Paris, 2008

One of OBARC's final exhibitions, Prelude to the 1908 Revolution: The Ottomans in Paris centered on Ottomans living in exile in Paris during the 19th and early 20th centuries. The exhibition was accompanied by a documentary by François Georgeon entitled “The Paris of the Young Turks.”

== Research ==
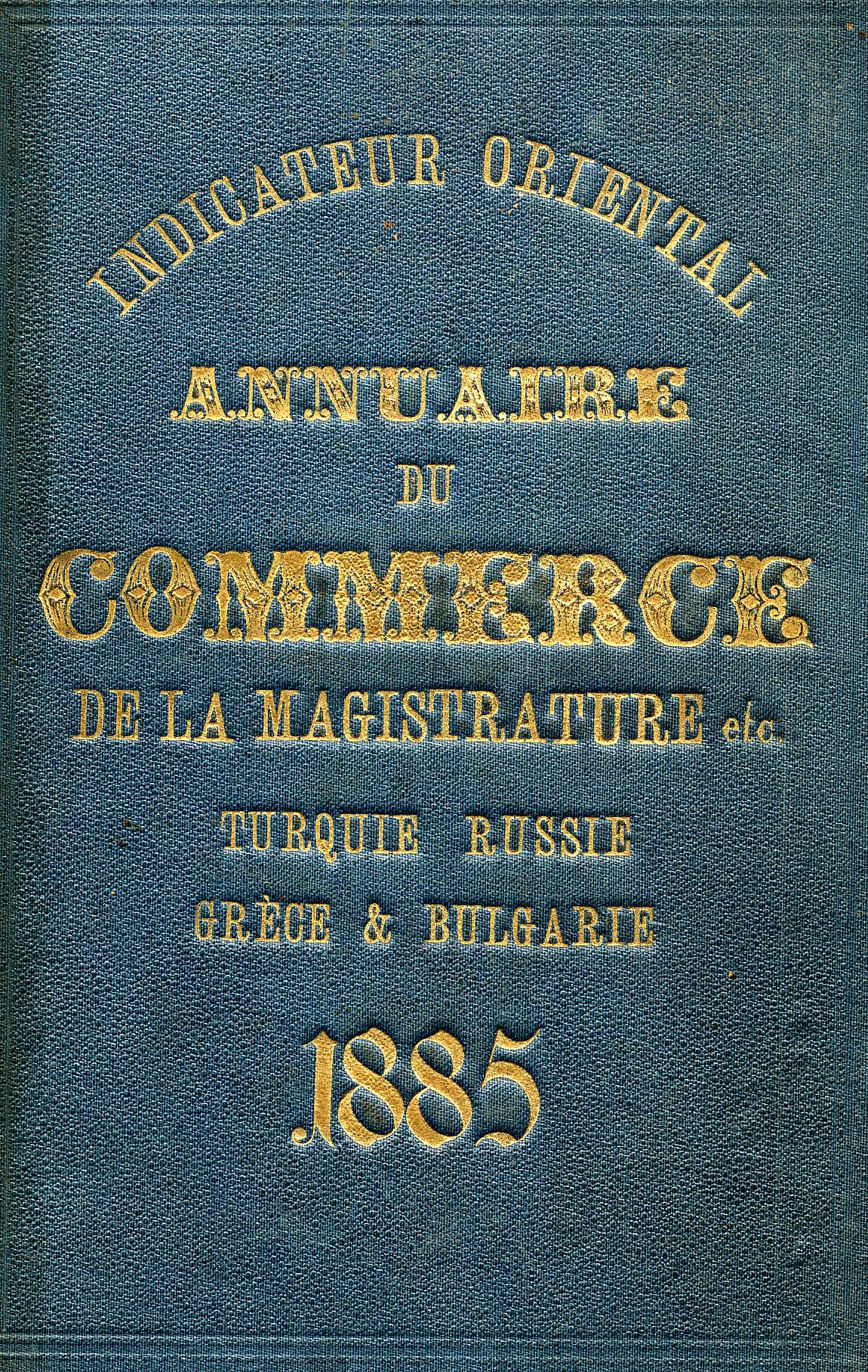
Indicateur Oriental Annuaire du Commerce de la Magistrature etc. Turquie Russie Grece & Bulgarie, 1885.

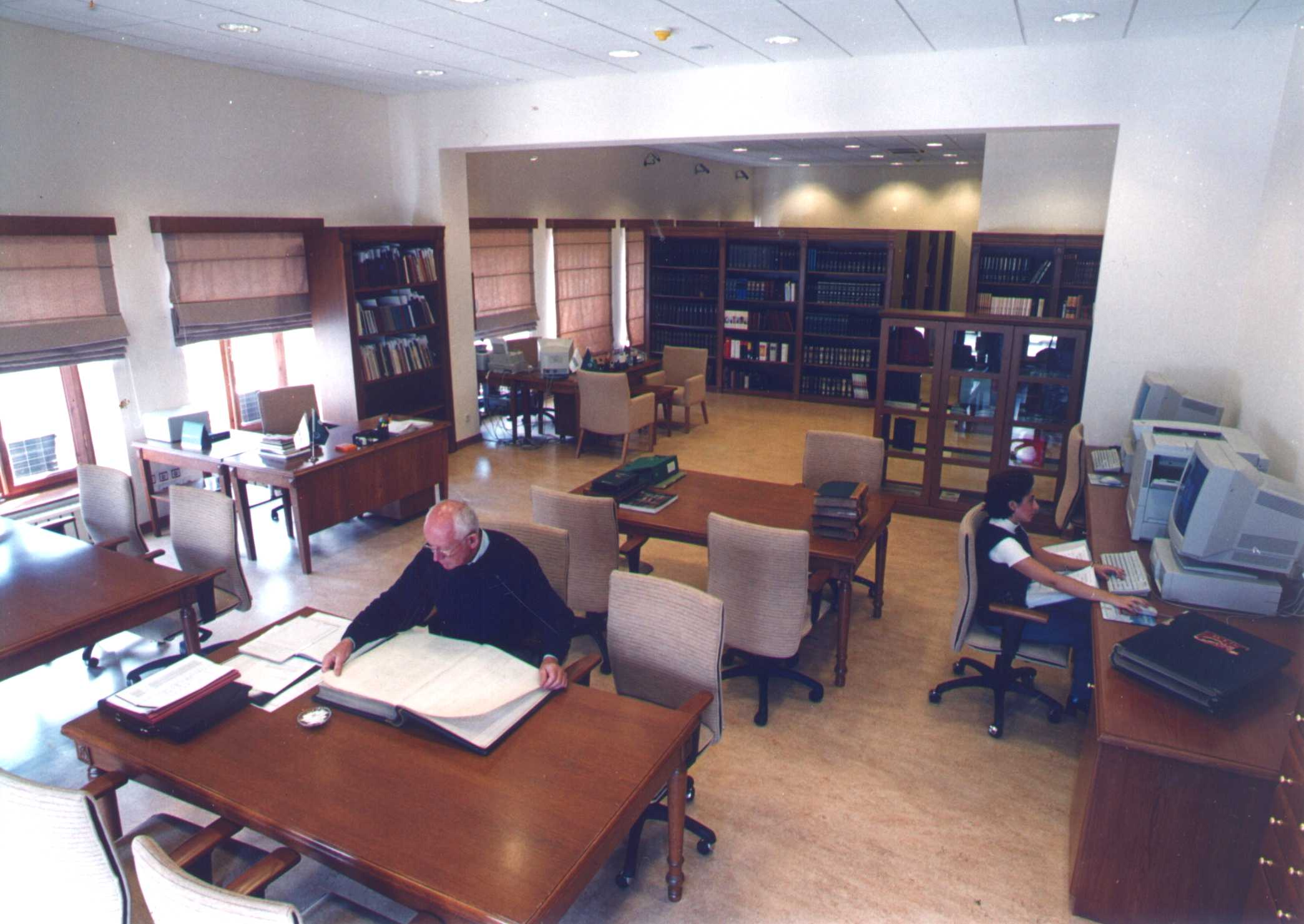
OBARC Library

Archive

The archives of the Ottoman Bank chronicled a process beginning with the establishment of the bank in 1856, through the 1930s. In addition to documenting the history of banking and finance, the archive encompassed a broader research area that included the process of modernization in Europe, the Mediterranean and the Middle East. To this purpose, its archives were supplemented with collections obtained through collaboration with other institutions, through donations, and through acquisitions. To date, more than 1,300,000 documents have been made accessible in digital format to researchers.

The archive's Documentation Annex housed digital copies of visual materials such as the Oriental Trade Directories (Annuaire Oriental du Commerce); newspapers and magazines; monographs; statistics; reports; documents pertaining to prominent families in Turkey; trade correspondence; postage stamps; copper, nickel, silver, gold coins and paper money; decorations, medals, and badges; calling cards and postcards; photographs and portraits; blueprints and maps. The Documentation Annex also contained visual records of the materials used in exhibitions hosted by OBARC.

Records kept by the Italian Consulate in Istanbul documenting the Italian presence in the late Ottoman Empire were also included in the archive. Although a large part of this archival material relates to the period between 1870 and 1900, the collection more specifically covers the years from 1847 to 1925. The Italian consular records shed light on leading Italian associations of the time; on the activities of Italian institutions, such as hospitals and schools; and on trade correspondence maintained between foreign companies, both within the Ottoman Empire and abroad.

Other archives digitalized in OBARC's collection included the archives of the Church of Saint Peter and Saint Paul in Galata and the original papers of the World Council of Churches in Geneva. Dating back to the 18th century, the Church of Saint Peter and Saint Paul archives document the Latin community in Galata, as well as the transformation of this area over a span of more than two centuries. The first catalogue, prepared by Fr. Benedetto Palazzo in 1939 and published in Italian in 2002, was examined, itemized, translated, and finally converted into digital format. The original papers are preserved in the Church Archive. The World Council of Churches archives cover the period from 1950 to 1980 and include 472 folders dealing with ecumenical assistance provided to refugees arriving in Turkey. A selection of these documents dating back to an earlier period concern the assistance given by the Union of Evangelical Congregational Churches in Bulgaria and the United Church Board for World Ministries in the U.S.

In 2008, in honor of the centenary of the birth of Turkish architect Sedad Hakkı Eldem, the Ottoman Bank Museum presented two exhibitions with accompanying catalogues. Along with the objects used in these exhibitions, OBARC made available to researchers materials relating to Sedad Hakkı Eldem from the Rahmi M. Koç Archive. The Sadberk Hanım Museum manages the Sedad Hakkı Eldem collection.

Library

OBARC housed a specialized library, which remains open to the public under the umbrella of SALT. Its collection includes 16,000 monographs and 1,200 titles of serials in major European and Middle Eastern languages. Operating parallel to the archive, the library's collection focuses on the economic, political, social and urban history of the Republic and the Ottoman Empire, beginning in the Tanzimat era. It also includes titles on the history of institutions in Turkey and Europe, collected through the European Association for Banking and Financial History network.

== Publications ==
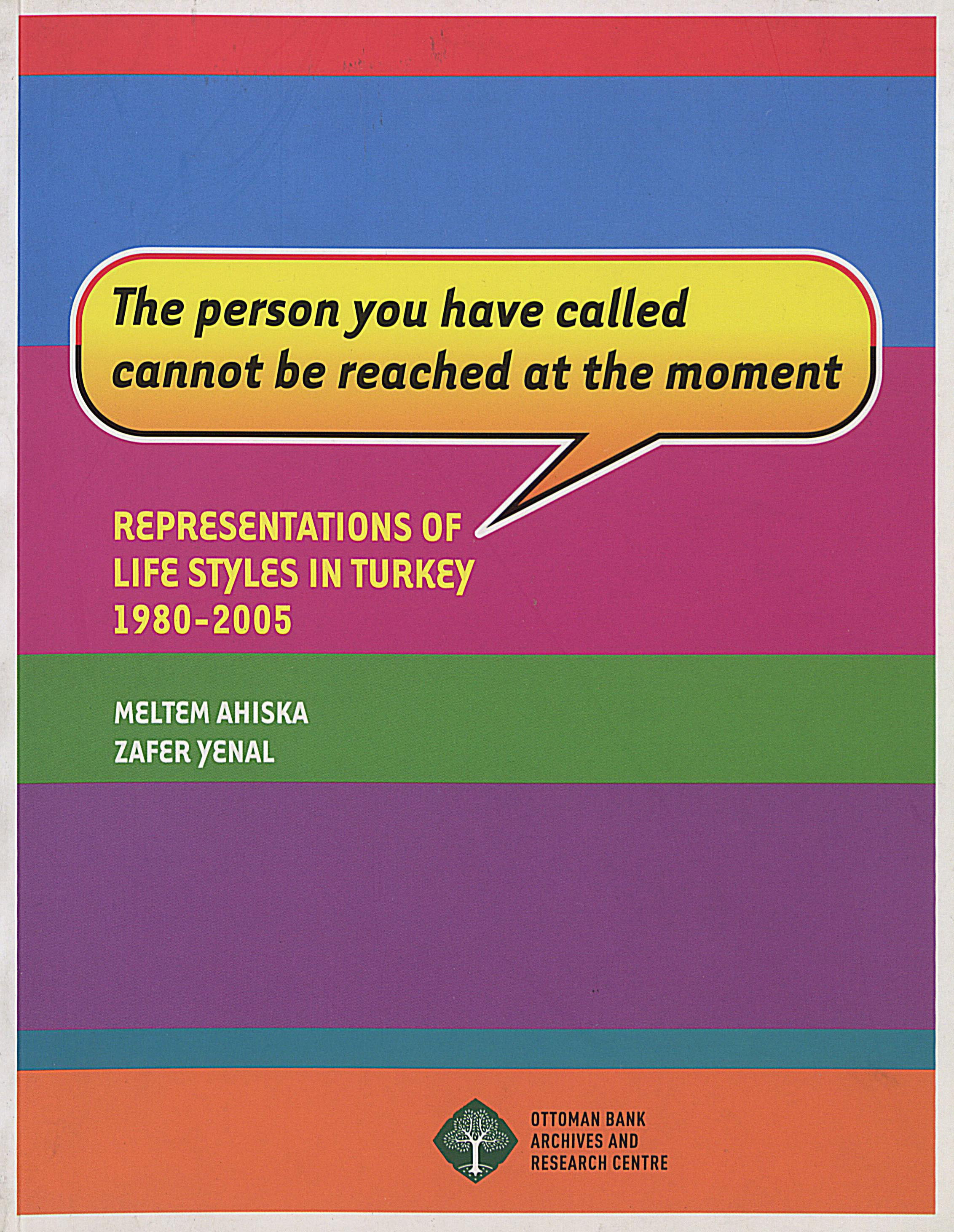
Representations of Lifestyles in Turkey, 2006.

From 1997 to 2010, OBARC published several volumes making the results of its research available to the public. These publications related to exhibitions, lectures, and specific projects, and include the works submitted to OBARC within the framework of the Prize Competition for Research on the History of Banking and Finance, which was jointly organized by OBARC, the European Association for Banking and Financial History and the History Foundation of Turkey.
