= Museum of Contemporary Art =

Museum of Contemporary Art (often abbreviated to MCA, MoCA or MOCA) may refer to:

== Africa ==
- Museum of Contemporary Art (Tangier), Morocco, officially le Galerie d'Art Contemporain Mohamed Drissi

== Asia ==
=== East Asia ===
- Museum of Contemporary Art Shanghai, mainland China
- Museum of Contemporary Art Taipei, Taiwan
- Museum of Contemporary Art Tokyo, Japan
- 21st Century Museum of Contemporary Art, Kanazawa, Japan
- National Museum of Modern and Contemporary Art, Seoul, South Korea

=== Southeast Asia ===
- Museum of Contemporary Art (Bangkok), Thailand

=== West Asia ===
- Tehran Museum of Contemporary Art, Iran

== Australia ==
- Museum of Contemporary Art Australia, Sydney
- Museum of Contemporary Art, Brisbane, 1987–1994

== Europe ==
- Museum of Contemporary Art, Zagreb, Croatia
- Château de Montsoreau-Museum of Contemporary Art, Montsoreau, France
- State Museum of Contemporary Art, Thessaloniki, Greece
- Museum of Contemporary Art of Rome, Italy
- Moco Museum, Amsterdam, Netherlands; Barcelona, Spain; and London, England
- Museum of Contemporary Art (Skopje), North Macedonia
- National Museum of Contemporary Art (Romania), Bucharest, Romania
- Museum of Contemporary Art, Belgrade, Serbia
- Barcelona Museum of Contemporary Art, Barcelona, Spain
- Museum of Contemporary Art, Vigo, Spain
- Museum of Contemporary Art (Basel), Switzerland

== North America ==
=== Canada ===
- Montreal Museum of Contemporary Art
- Museum of Contemporary Art Toronto Canada

=== Mexico ===
- Museum of Contemporary Art (Aguascalientes), Aguascalientes, Mexico
- Museum of Contemporary Art, Monterrey, Monterrey, Mexico

=== United States ===
- Scottsdale Museum of Contemporary Art, Scottsdale, Arizona
- Museum of Contemporary Art, Tucson, Arizona
- Museum of Contemporary Art, Los Angeles, California
- Museum of Contemporary Art San Diego, California
- Museum of Contemporary Art Denver, Colorado
- Museum of Contemporary Art Jacksonville, Florida
- Museum of Contemporary Art, North Miami, Florida
- Atlanta Contemporary Art Center, Atlanta, Georgia
- Museum of Contemporary Art of Georgia, Atlanta, Georgia
- Museum of Contemporary Art, Chicago, Illinois
- Indianapolis Contemporary, Indianapolis, Indiana, formerly known as the Indianapolis Museum of Contemporary Art
- Nerman Museum of Contemporary Art, Overland Park, Kansas
- Massachusetts Museum of Contemporary Art, North Adams, Massachusetts
- Museum of Contemporary Art Detroit, Michigan
- Kemper Museum of Contemporary Art, Kansas City, Missouri
- New Museum of Contemporary Art, New York, New York
- Museum of Contemporary Art Cleveland, Ohio
- Puerto Rico Museum of Contemporary Art, San Juan, Puerto Rico
- Utah Museum of Contemporary Art, Salt Lake City, Utah
- Virginia Museum of Contemporary Art, Virginia Beach, Virginia
- Madison Museum of Contemporary Art, Madison, Wisconsin

== South America ==
- Museum of Contemporary Art of Lima, Peru
- Museum of Contemporary Art of Rosario, Argentina
- Museum of Contemporary Art, University of São Paulo, Brazil
- Santiago Museum of Contemporary Art, Chile
- Museum of Contemporary Art, Valdivia, Chile

== See also ==
- List of contemporary art museums
- Contemporary Art Museum
