= Didem Özbek =

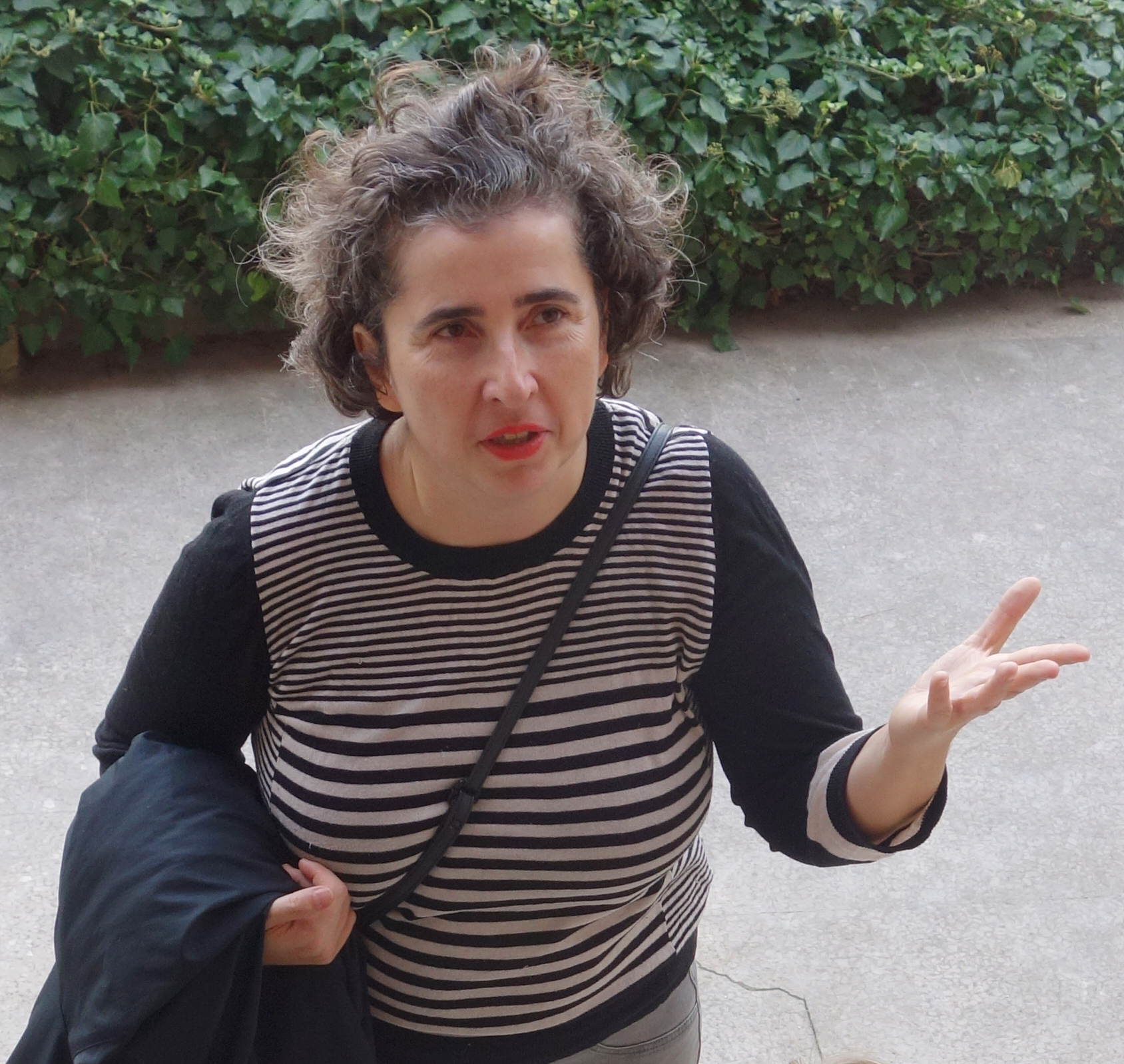
Didem Özbek, 2015

Didem Özbek (born in 1970) is a conceptual artist, curator and graphic designer, living and working in Istanbul. She studied at Mimar Sinan Fine Arts University in Istanbul and gained her MA in Communication Design at Central Saint Martins in London.

== Practice ==
Özbek's artistic practice is research based. She develops conceptual art projects and works with installation, performance, limited edition artist book and printed material that encourage the participation of the audience. Her work deals explores the impact migration has on demography, identity politics, global economic changes, community and belonging. Her work has been shown internationally, in spaces such as Umetnostna Galerija Maribor (2006), Frieze Art Fair (2008), Museo Madre, Napoli (2009), The Armory Show New York (2009), Tate Modern (2010), and the Asia Triennial Manchester (2011), Gwangju Biennale “Facing Borders” (2018), curated by Gridthiya Gaweewong. She was invited to panels like the round table Manifestation annullée at Centre Pompidou Paris together with Banu Cennetoglu and Halil Altindere.

In 2006, she co-founded PiST/// Interdisciplinary Project Space in Pangalti together with photographer Osman Bozkurt – organising exhibitions, talks, screenings, discussions, publications, and performances by collaborating with local and international art professionals, "a catalyst for a dialogue among other artist run/alternative spaces. Rather than being a closed box, PiST/// seems to be functioning as an open platform, where artists, administrators, curators get together and discuss". PiST was also co-hosting an international research and production residency program for artists from Denmark and the Netherlands in collaboration with The Danish Arts Agency and Fonds BKVB / Netherlands Foundation for Visual Arts, Design and Architecture.

== Projects ==
2011: Life in the UK / Balance of Probabilities, a commission for the Asia Triennial in Manchester, Castlefield Gallery

2012: He was working on a project in order to open a watermelon exhibition, a series of installations, performances and a talk-marathon, SALT Galata in Istanbul

2015: Propulsion, Zilberman's project space in Istanbul

2018: Dream Trip, Gwangju Biennale
