= Palazzo Boccella =

Coordinates: 43.8449683°N 10.5093972°E

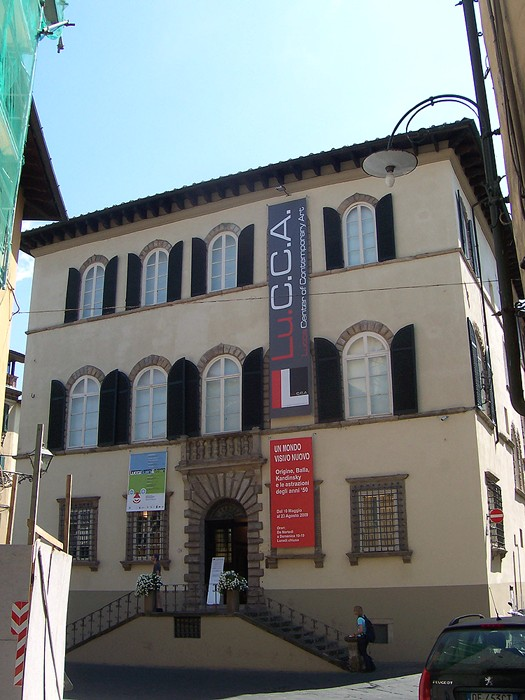
Lucca - Center of Contemporary Art

The Palazzo Bocella is a Renaissance style palace located on Via della Fratta #36, near the Piazza dell'Anfiteatro, in central Lucca, region of Tuscany, Italy. The palace in 2015 houses the Lucca Center of Contemporary Art, or nuovo Museo di Arte Contemporanea Lu.C.C.A.

The palace is a museum and gallery for contemporary exhibits and performances.
