= Panama Museum of Contemporary Art =

- Museo de Arte Contemporáneo de Panamá
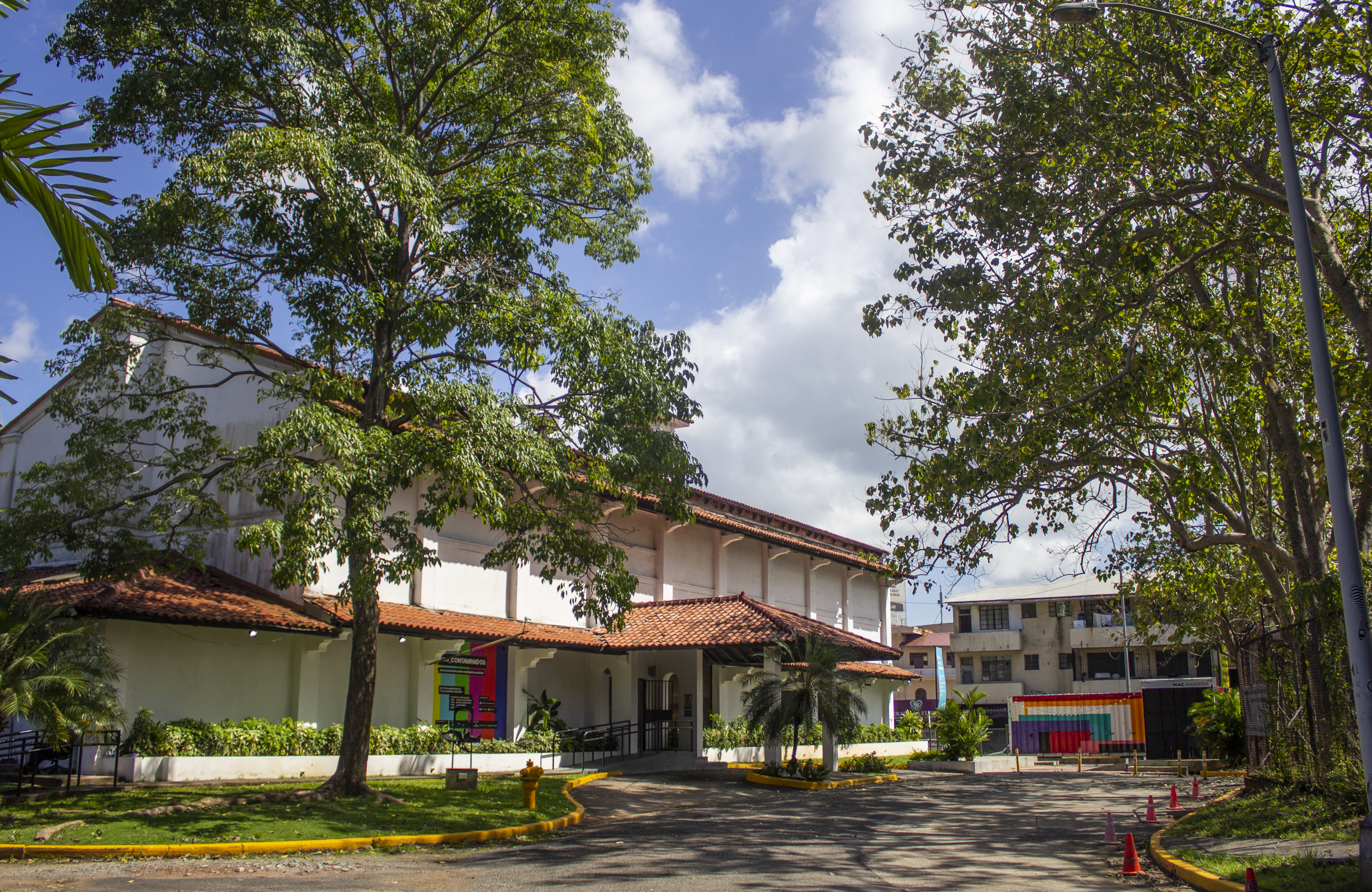
- Entrance to the Panama Museum of Contemporary Art.
- Former name: Panamanian Institute of Art (Panarte) (1962-1983)
- Established: 1983
- Location: Calle San Blas, Panama City, Panama
- Coordinates: 8.96091944°N 79.5430388°W
- Type: Contemporary Art Museum
- Collection size: 1200 approx.
- Executive director: María Lucía Alemán
- President: Antonio Murzi
- Curator: Juan Canela
- Website: macpanama.org

The Museum of Contemporary Art of Panama (Spanish: Museo de Arte Contemporáneo de Panamá), popularly called MAC Panamá, is the only museum of contemporary art that exists in Panama. It is a non-governmental, non-profit organization that has legal status and its building is located in Panama City. The institution was founded in 1962 as the Panamanian Institute of Art (Spanish: Instituto Panameño de Arte), in 1983 it became the current museum.

The museum is in charge for being a cultural institution for the diffusion of knowledge and appreciation of contemporary art, promoting cultural and creative development. Its collections are made up of more than 700 works created by Panamanian and Latin American artists of the 20th and 21st centuries.

== History ==
The Panamanian Institute of Art (Panarte) was founded in 1962 as a non-profit institution dedicated to promoting Panamanian art. In 1983 it became the Museum of Contemporary Art of Panama (MAC Panama), a private entity paid for by companies and art lovers.

At its foundation, in 1962, the Panamanian Institute of Art, operated in rented premises and, in addition to art exhibitions, presented plays, concerts and films by renowned directors. Despite not having its own facilities, it had a large number of exhibitions by renowned Panamanian and Latin American artists, receiving a work from each exhibitor as a donation. In this way, it was creating a valuable collection, but without its own shelter.

In 1983, the Panarte board of directors decided to look for walls for the Collection, so that it could continue to grow in size and excellence. A great campaign was started, where many people and companies contributed. With what was contributed in addition to a loan from the Panama Savings Bank, it was possible to buy and remodel the old Masonic Temple located in Ancón, in the Former Panama Canal Zone. In this way, it was possible to give walls to the permanent collection and the Museum of Contemporary Art, belonging to Panarte, was created.

The transformation process was carried out by Coqui Calderón and Graciela de Eleta who received the Order of Vasco Núñez de Balboa as recognition.

== Collections ==
The museum is made up of around 1,200 works of art, the MAC collection has specific works from dates prior to 1962, which allow us to complete a panoramic vision of the styles of the 20th century. It covers all techniques: painting, sculpture, graphics, photography and, more recently, installations. It features works by prominent artists, both Panamanian and Latin American.

The permanent collection includes:

- Works by Panamanian artists.
- Works from the 20th century to the present.
- Works by renowned international artists.
- Historical memory of Panamanian Art.

== Educational programming ==
In addition to the exhibitions of the Permanent Collection and national and international temporary exhibitions, guided tours are offered for groups or schools, drawing, painting and graphic design classes, educational workshops, seminars and talks on appreciation and history of art. The MAC also has a framing workshop.

== Archives ==
The Museum has a wide selection of catalogs on its exhibitions, representation of books and written materials on Panamanian and Latin American artists, as well as volumes on certain artistic periods to support the research of the student community.

== See also ==
- List of museums in Panama
