= Marine Exhibition Center of Punta Culebra =

Visitor center located in Panama City, Panama

Punta Culebra Nature Center
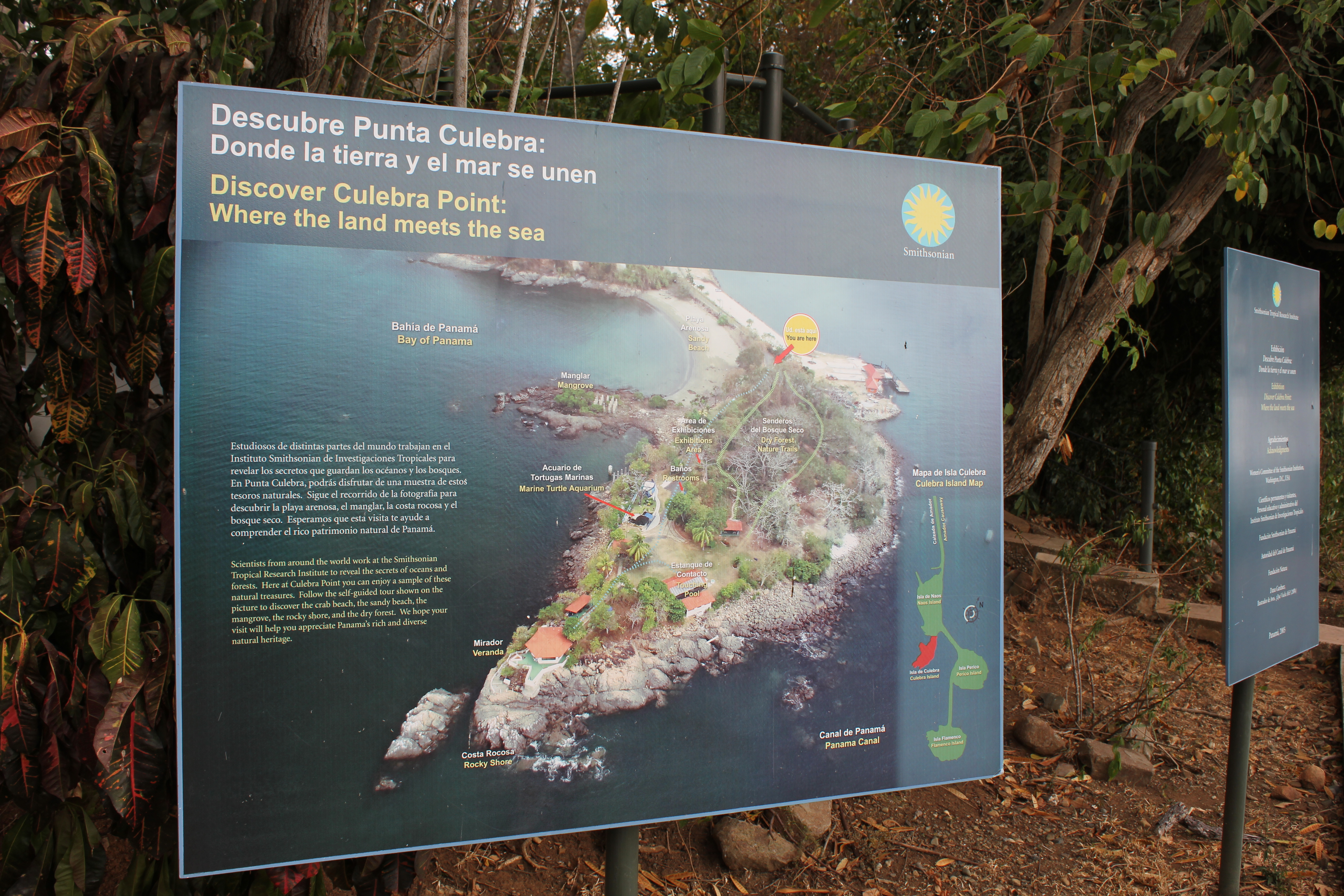
- Welcome Sign to Punta Culebra
- Interactive map of Punta Culebra Nature Center
- Type: open-air museum
- Location: Panama City, Panama
- Coordinates: 8°54′43″N 79°31′43″W
- Area: 1 1/2 hectares (3.7 acres)
- Created: 1996
- Hiking trails: 2
- Website: stri.si.edu

The Punta Culebra Nature Center (Spanish: Centro de Exhibiciones Marinas de Punta Culebra) is a visitor center located in Panama City, on one of the islands connected by the Amador Causeway. It is operated by the Smithsonian Tropical Research Institute, also located in Panama. The center focuses mainly on marine and terrestrial science and education, conservation and interpretation of marine coastal environments in the tropics. Among its attractions, the Fabulous Frogs of Panama, a touch tank with echinoderms and turtles are some of the exhibits found in Punta Culebra. A trail to a stretch of tropical dry forest is also part of the attractions where free roaming animals such as raccoons, sloths, green iguanas and beautiful birds and butterflies can be found.
