= Istanbul Contemporary Art Museum =

- İstanbul Çağdaş Sanat Müzesi, iS.CaM
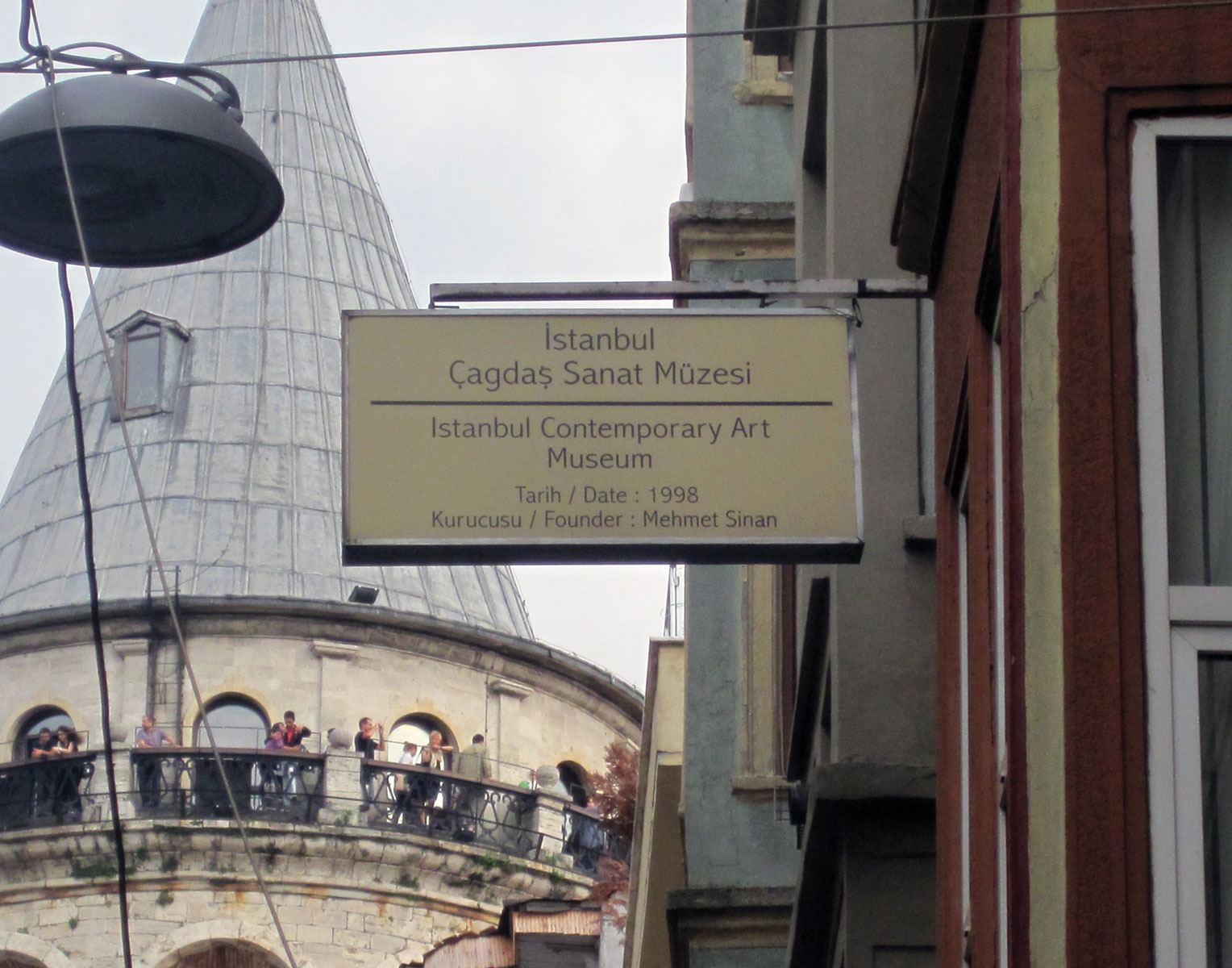
- Istanbul Museum
- Established: 1997
- Location: Galata, Istanbul, Turkey
- Type: Contemporary art museum
- Collection size: Mehmet Sinan Collection
- President: Genco Gulan
- Curator: Marcus Graf
- Public transit access: Subway available at Sishane.
- Parking: Available at Sishane.
- Website: www.istanbulmuseum.org

Istanbul Contemporary Art Museum (iS.CaM) is an independent, artist run museum established in Istanbul in 1997. It is the oldest contemporary art museum in Istanbul. iS.CaM an alternative art organisation that develops, evolves and collaborates with other institutions and networks. One of its tenets is that art and education should go together hand in hand. In terms of the Internet it is pioneering, including the establishment of the Web Biennial, a Biennial entirely on the Internet. The founder is conceptual artist Genco Gulan and the chief curator is Marcus Graf. It collaborates with Galata Perform in many projects.

Genco Gulan established "Istanbul Contemporary Art Museum" as an art project in 1997. The project has evolved for many years. Recently he manifested in Berlin that he is the "Erste Lebende Kunst Museum" (the first living art museum) after Timm Ulrichs.

== Web Biennial ==
The Web Biennial, abbreviated as "WB", is an online Art exhibition of net-art and web-art. It is organised by Istanbul Contemporary Art Museum, iS.CaM, and founded by Genco Gulan right at the turn of the century. As a web Formation Web Biennial is as old as Wikipedia. Every two years WB takes the form of virtual 'pavilions', presenting a large amount of contemporary Internet art, linking them in one way or another. Each participating website or project is represented by special tag in the title tag and or a link on the Web Biennial website. Though an online project, Web Biennial is sometimes compared to other Biennials. See:

In every area of life, a new generation of young Turks is reaching outward. This year's Art Biennale will draw artists from Bosnia, Iran, Egypt, Greece and Lebanon—a most uncommon mix—while the Web Biennale will feature work by

Armenians, Ukrainians, Serbs, Macedonians and Romanians. "Istanbul these days has as much dynamism as New York," says Genco Gulan, director of the Istanbul Contemporary Art Museum. If anything, he enthuses, "Istanbul is more alive. There's more interest here in doing something new.
