= Marcus Graf =

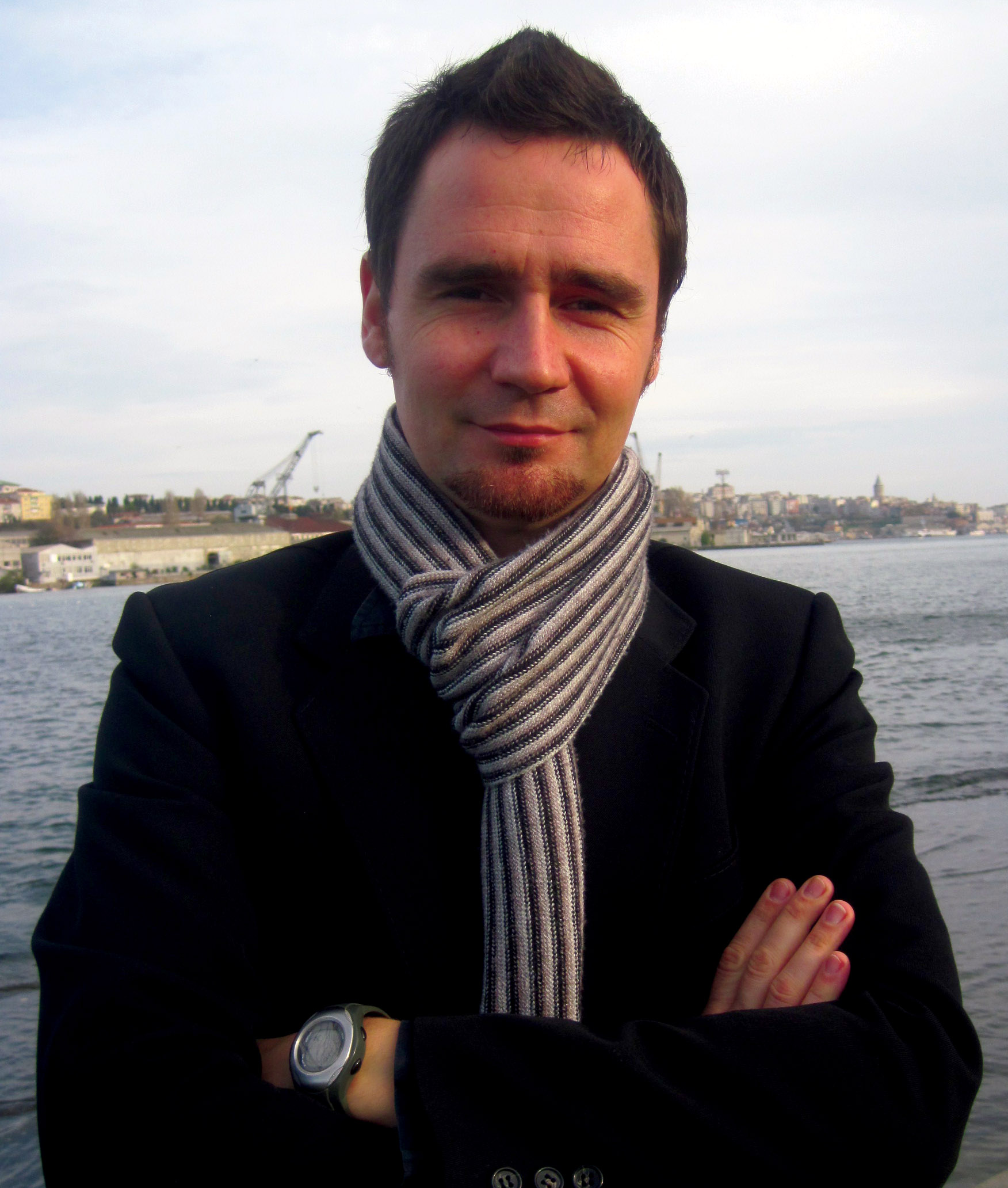
Graf

Marcus Graf (born 1974 in Hamm), is an art curator, writer and artist based in Istanbul, Turkey.

== Bibliography ==
- Graf, Marcus. Conceptual Colors of Genco Gulan, Revolver Publishing, 2012. ISBN 978-3868952049
- Graf, Marcus. Genco Gulan: Kavramsal Renkler, Galata Perform Publishing, 2008. ISBN 9789944016001
- Graf, Marcus, Istanbul Biennale – Geschichte, Position, Wirkung, KV-Kadmos, Berlin, 2011.
- Graf, Marcus, Löchte Jan, Zier Tobias, Jan Löchte – Der neue Katalog ist da, Staatliche Akademie der Bildenden Künste Stuttgart, 2010.
- Graf, Marcus, Fragmented Realities, Boyut, Istanbul, 2009.
- Graf, Marcus & Baur, Andreas & Hodjak, Franz, Rudolf Reiber. Blast of Silence, Staatliche Akademie der Bildenden Künste Stuttgart, 2007.
