= Van Otterloo =

Van Otterloo is a Dutch toponymic surname. Notable people with the surname include:

- Gerrit-Jan van Otterloo, Dutch politician
- Rogier van Otterloo, Dutch composer and conductor
- Tony van Otterloo, Dutch actor
- Willem van Otterloo, Dutch conductor, cellist and composer

== See also ==
- Otterlo
