= Garanti BBVA =

Turkish bank

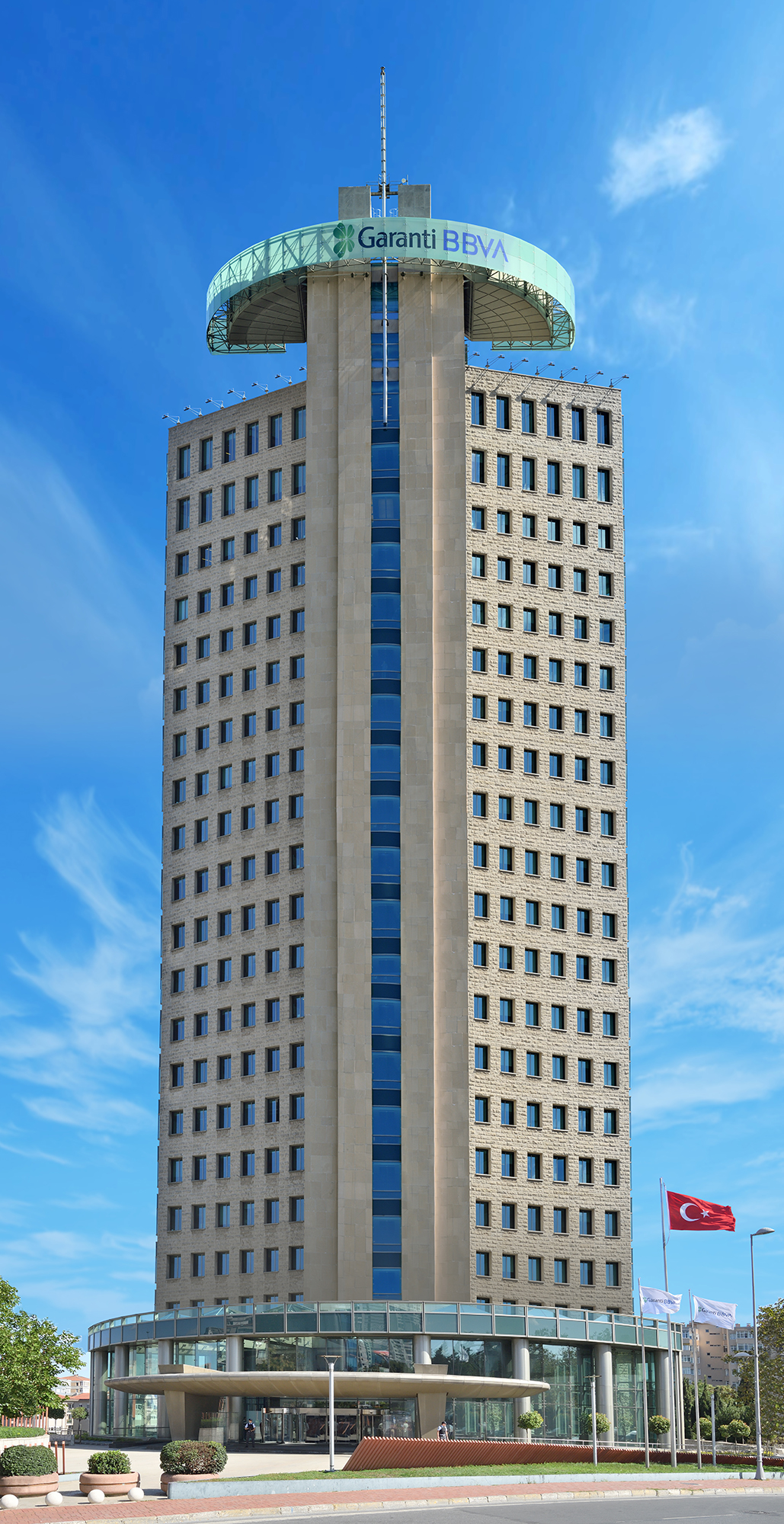
- Type: Anonim Şirket
- Traded as: BİST: GARAN
- Industry: Banking, financial services
- Founded: 11 April 1946; 80 years ago
- Headquarters: Istanbul, Turkey
- Area served: Worldwide
- Key people: Mahmut Akten (CEO); Murat Atay (EVP)
- Products: List: Financial services, credit cards, consumer banking, corporate banking, investment banking, mortgage loans, private banking, pension, life insurance, brokerage, leasing, factoring, asset management
- Revenue: ▲US$15.53 billion (2024)
- Operating income: ▲US$3.50 billion (2024)
- Net income: ▲US$2.64 billion (2024)
- Total assets: ▲US$88.23 billion (2024)
- Total equity: ▲US$9.52 billion (2024)
- Owner: BBVA (85.97%)
- Number of employees: 22,016 (2023)
- Subsidiaries: List: GarantiBank International N.V. GarantiBank Moscow GarantiBank Romania Garanti Asset Management Garanti Securities Garanti Pension Garanti Leasing Garanti Payment Systems Garanti Mortgage Garanti Technology
- Website: garantibbva.com.tr

Garanti BBVA (legal name Türkiye Garanti Bankası A.Ş.; formerly referred to as Garanti Bank in English) is a Turkish financial services company based in Turkey. 86% of Garanti's stakes are owned by the Spanish bank Banco Bilbao Vizcaya Argentaria (BBVA).

== Overview ==
Garanti Bank is the second-largest private bank in Turkey, with ₺220 billion assets at the end of 2023.

Garanti provides services in all business lines including payment systems, retail, commercial, wholesale, SME, private and investment banking. Together with its domestic and international subsidiaries (Garanti Bank International, Garanti Bank SA, Garanti Bank Moscow), Garanti offers services also in pension and life insurance, leasing, factoring, brokerage and asset management.

Garanti serves more than twenty-five million customers through 805 domestic branches, seven foreign branches in the Turkish Republic of Northern Cyprus and one in Malta; two international representative offices in Düsseldorf and Shanghai; more than 5,511 ATMs; a call center and Internet, mobile and social banking platforms built on technological infrastructure.

== Ownership ==
The shares of the stock of Garanti Bank are traded on the Borsa Istanbul, LSE and OTCQX. The shareholding in the bank's stock is as depicted in the table below:

Garanti Bank stock ownership
Rank	Name of owner	Percentage ownership
1	Banco Bilbao Vizcaya Argentaria (BBVA)	86.00
3	Others	14.00
	Total	100.00

== Member companies ==
The companies that comprise the Garanti Bank Group include, but are not limited to, the following:

- Garanti BBVA Crypto
- Garanti Bank International N.V.
- Garanti Bank Moscow
- Garanti Bank Romania
- Garanti Asset Management
- Garanti Securities
- Garanti Pension
- Garanti Leasing
- Garanti Factoring
- Garanti Payment Systems
- Garanti Mortgage
- Garanti Technology

== See also ==
- Ottoman Bank
- Salt Research

== Sources ==
- Garanti BBVA Integrated Annual Report 2019 (PDF), Garanti BBVA, 2019, archived from the original (PDF) on 17 April 2020
