= Salt Research =

SALT
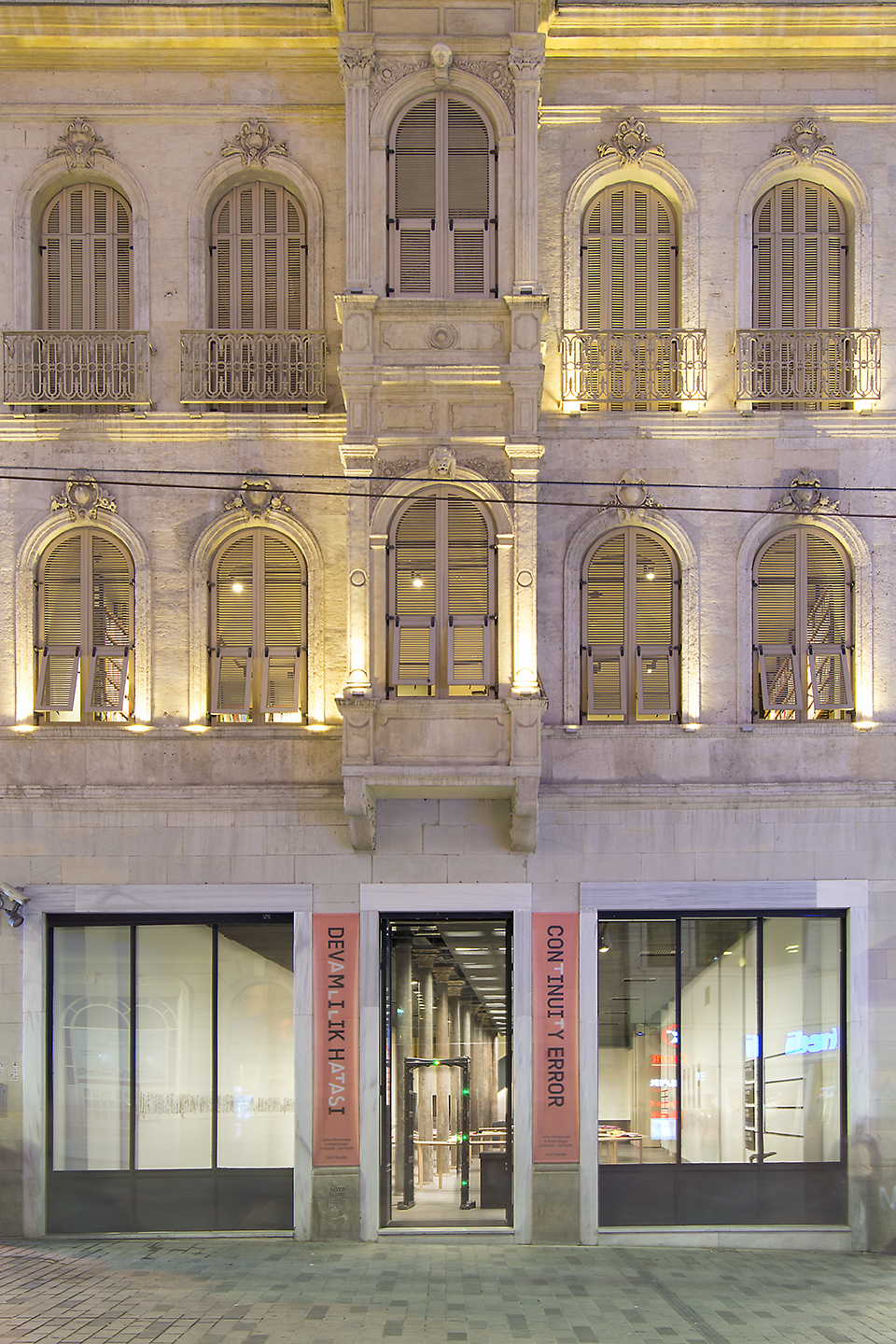
- Exterior of SALT Galata
- Established: 2011; 15 years ago
- Location: SALT Beyoğlu; Istiklal Cd. No:136; Beyoğlu, Istanbul; Turkey; SALT Galata; Bankalar Cd. No:11; Karaköy, Istanbul; Turkey
- Founder: Vasif Kortun, Garanti Bank
- Website: saltonline.org

SALT is a Turkish contemporary art institution. It was started by Vasif Kortun and Garanti Bank in 2011, and has exhibition and workshop spaces in Istanbul and Ankara, Turkey. It combines the previous activities of the Garanti Gallery, the Ottoman Bank Archives and Research Centre and the Platform Garanti Contemporary Art Center of the bank. It is one of the six members of L'Internationale, a confederation of European art institutions; the other member institutions are the Moderna galerija in Ljubljana, in Slovenia; the Museo Nacional Centro de Arte Reina Sofía in Madrid, in Spain; the Museu d'Art Contemporani de Barcelona in Barcelona, also in Spain; the Museum van Hedendaagse Kunst Antwerpen in Antwerp, in Belgium; and the Van Abbemuseum in Eindhoven, in the Netherlands.

== Exhibition spaces ==
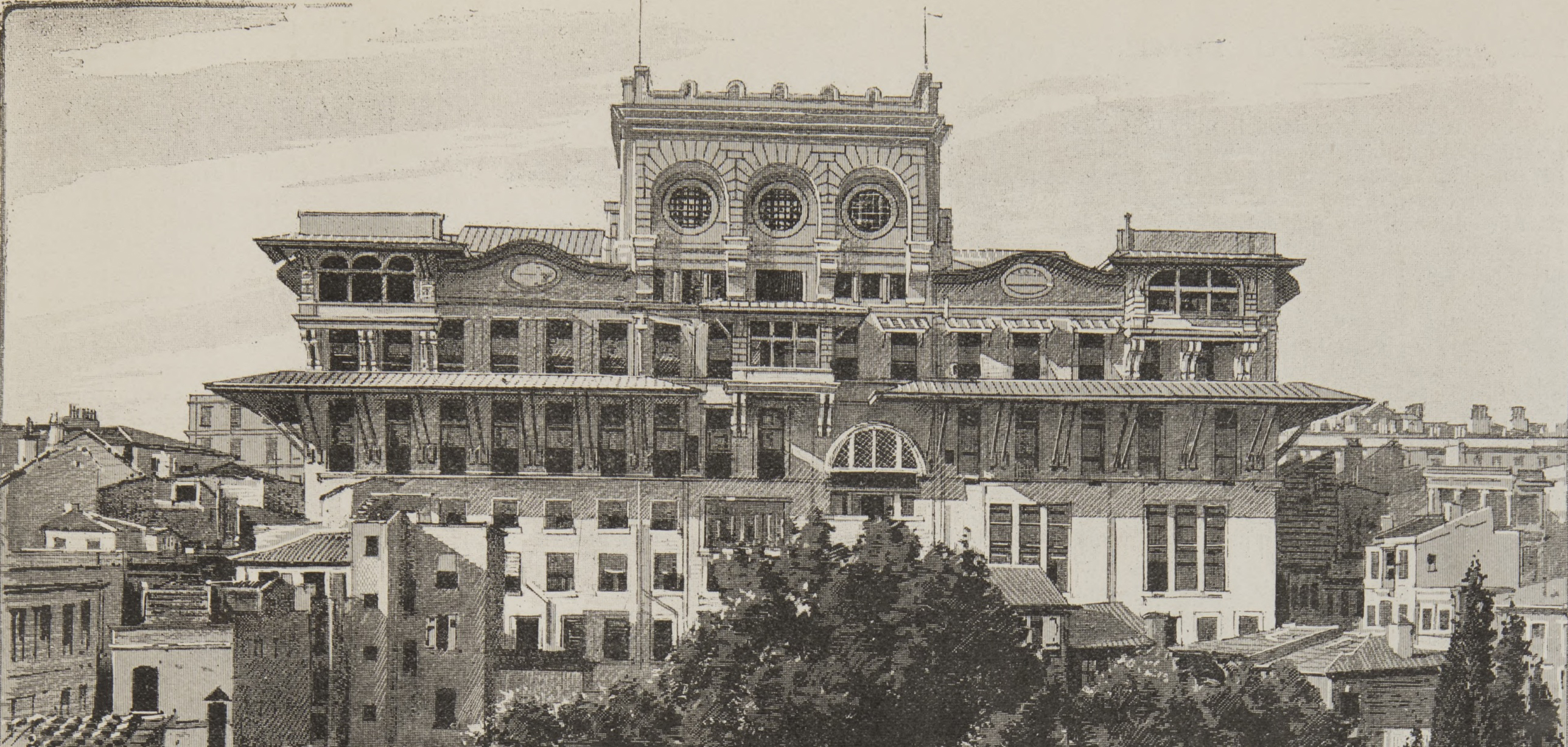
The Imperial Ottoman Bank headquarters in 1896

SALT has three exhibition spaces, all owned by Garanti BBVA: the former headquarters of the Imperial Ottoman Bank in Galata, Istanbul; a former apartment block, the Siniossoglou Apartments, in Beyoğlu, Istanbul; and a former guest-house of the Ottoman Bank in Ulus, Ankara.

== Exhibitions and Projects ==
In 2012, the artist and curator Didem Özbek staged her project He was working on a project in order to open a watermelon exhibition at Salt Galata, drawing on Sait Faik Abasıyanık's story Bir Karpuz Sergisi (English: A Watermelon Exhibition).

== History ==
Design and Construction of the Building (1892) The Salt Galata building, located on Bankalar Street in Karaköy, Istanbul, was designed by French Levantine architect Alexandre Vallaury. It served as the headquarters of the Imperial Ottoman Bank (Bank-ı Osmanî-i Şahane) between 1892 and 1999.

Urban and Architectural Context of Bankalar Street (19th–20th Century) In the 19th century, as Westernization influences became apparent in the area known as Voyvoda Street, the establishment of banks such as the Central Bank, Ottoman Bank, İş Bank, Sümerbank, Tutum Bank, Deutsche Orient Bank, and Eti Bank led to the street being renamed Bankalar Street. The buildings are typically masonry brick structures featuring neoclassical façades. The Art Nouveau and Rococo styles of the period are also evident on the façades. Although the number of reinforced concrete buildings increased during the Republican era, the 19th-century streetscape still remains dominant.

Transformation in the Republican Period (1923–1990s)

With the establishment of the Republic, banks moved to the new capital, Ankara. As the population shifted along the street, the area, which had previously displayed Western architectural influences, evolved during the 1940s and 1950s into a center for electrical and lighting manufacturing. In Turkey, the use of historic buildings as museums dates back to the Ottoman period. Starting from the late 20th century, the practice of converting traditional buildings into museums, a trend common in many countries, gained significant traction in Anatolia during the 2000s.

Restoration and Reuse as Salt Galata (1998–2011) In 1998, Garanti Bank became the main shareholder of the building. While a bank branch operated on the ground floor, the structure functioned as the Ottoman Bank Banking and Financial Research Center. After undergoing various structural interventions, the building was repurposed and reopened in November 2011 under the name Salt Galata, serving as a cultural and arts center that also includes the Ottoman Bank Museum. The adaptive reuse project was carried out by Mimarlar Tasarım under the direction of Aga Khan Award-winning architect Han Tümertekin, while the restoration project was led by Yegân Kahya.

== Restoration Interventions ==
While reconfiguring the structure with different functions on each floor, unnecessary additions that compromised the originality were removed during the renovation process. The additions that characterized the building's identity, shedding light on its era, were preserved, while those that had lost their functionality and impact were eliminated. The original elements were restored and maintained, and contemporary additions were incorporated. Han Tümertekin expressed his approach to using original elements in the re-functioning project of Salt Galata: "The goal is not to replace something slightly aged or damaged with something new, but to preserve what exists and is original, by removing only the layer of dirt and not intervening in the patina, cracked or worn parts of the building, and to renew it in a way that does not cause it to lose its spirit."

In the new use of the building, an additional structure was created and designed in a way that can be distinguished from the original by using contemporary materials. The Salt Galata building is a total of eight floors, including basement levels and an added fourth floor, with an additional building constructed on the façade facing the Golden Horn. The main building consists of two basement levels and four floors above the ground floor, while the additional building has three basement levels and one floor above the ground floor.

The first basement level houses a museum and exhibition area, the second basement level contains an auditorium and foyer, and the third basement level is dedicated to technical areas. The ground floor, includes the entrance hall, cloakroom, reception, library, bookstore, inner garden, café, and restrooms. The stairs on the entrance floor lead to levels shaped around a gallery space that overlooks a rectangular courtyard. The first floor is used for workshops, the second floor for administrative offices, the third floor for an open archive section, and the fourth floor for special event areas.
