= Nesin Mathematics Village =

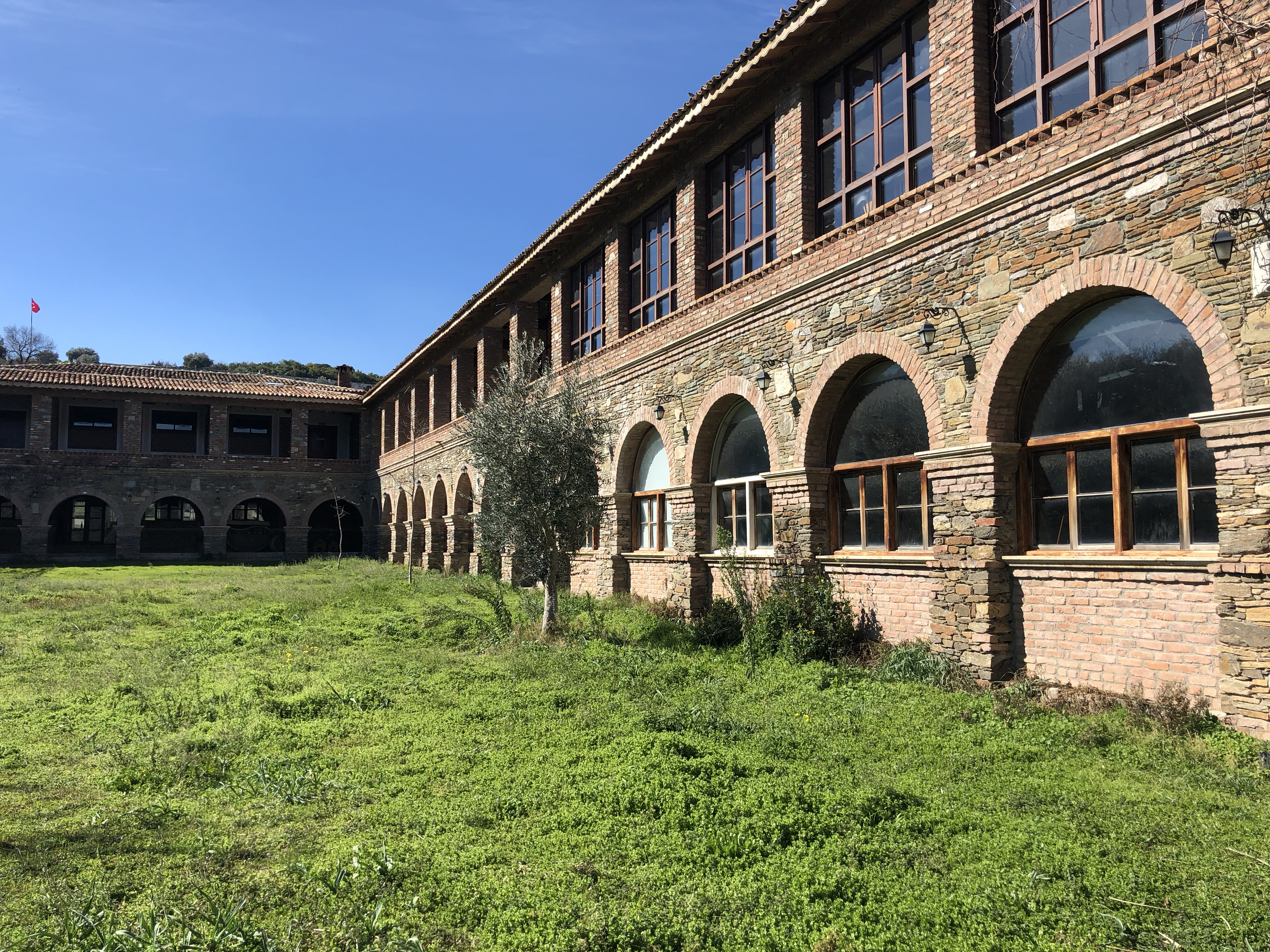

Location
- 37°57′04″N 27°25′51″E

Nesin Mathematics Village (Turkish: Nesin Matematik Köyü) is a non-profit educational and research institute devoted to mathematics. It was founded in 2007 and is located near the village of Şirince, in Selçuk district (İzmir Province, western Turkey).

This initiative was started by Ali Nesin and Sevan Nişanyan and generated many controversies with the Turkish state through the years. It received international recognition, and expended to others topics like art and philosophy.

One of the main goals is to make students more active when learning. They are also involved in the daily communal management of the village.

The village's logo is a rooster, described by Ali Nesin as an "animal that wakes you up, enlightens you".

== History ==
=== Origins ===
Ali Nesin is a Turkish mathematician specialized in algebra and its interplay with logic. He's the son of Aziz Nesin, a famous Turkish writer and satirist whose atheism attracted controversy. At the death of his father, in 1995, Ali Nesin gave up his research position in the USA to return in Turkey and take over the Nesin Foundation, a charitable organization created by Aziz Nesin to support and educate disadvantaged children.

In 1996, Ali Nesin became the head of the mathematics department of the newly founded Istanbul Bilgi University. He led an ambitious program, where first-year students were taught axiomatic set theory, including concepts like ordinals, cardinals, the axiom of choice, Zorn’s lemma and nonstandard numbers. However, many students were struggling. In 1998, he started organizing summer schools to fill up the knowledge gaps; but despite the help from the university, the logistic organization was too complicated to go on.

Together with his friend Sevan Nişanyan, a subversive writer and architect, they dreamed of a mathematical village. As Nişanyan recalls:

"We used to talk […] about the ideal educational environment, the architecture, the setting, the operation and so on. We looked […] at medieval monasteries and old Turkish medreses. And then one day, all of a sudden, it started looking doable."

They made the construction plans, and the building started in spring 2007 on a one hectare land located 800 m (2,600 ft) from Şirince, a town where Nişanyan previously restored buildings. The same year, around 100 students came (mostly from Istanbul Bilgi University) for the first summer school. Students and teachers helped for the construction.

=== Legal issues ===
==== Village eviction of 2007 ====
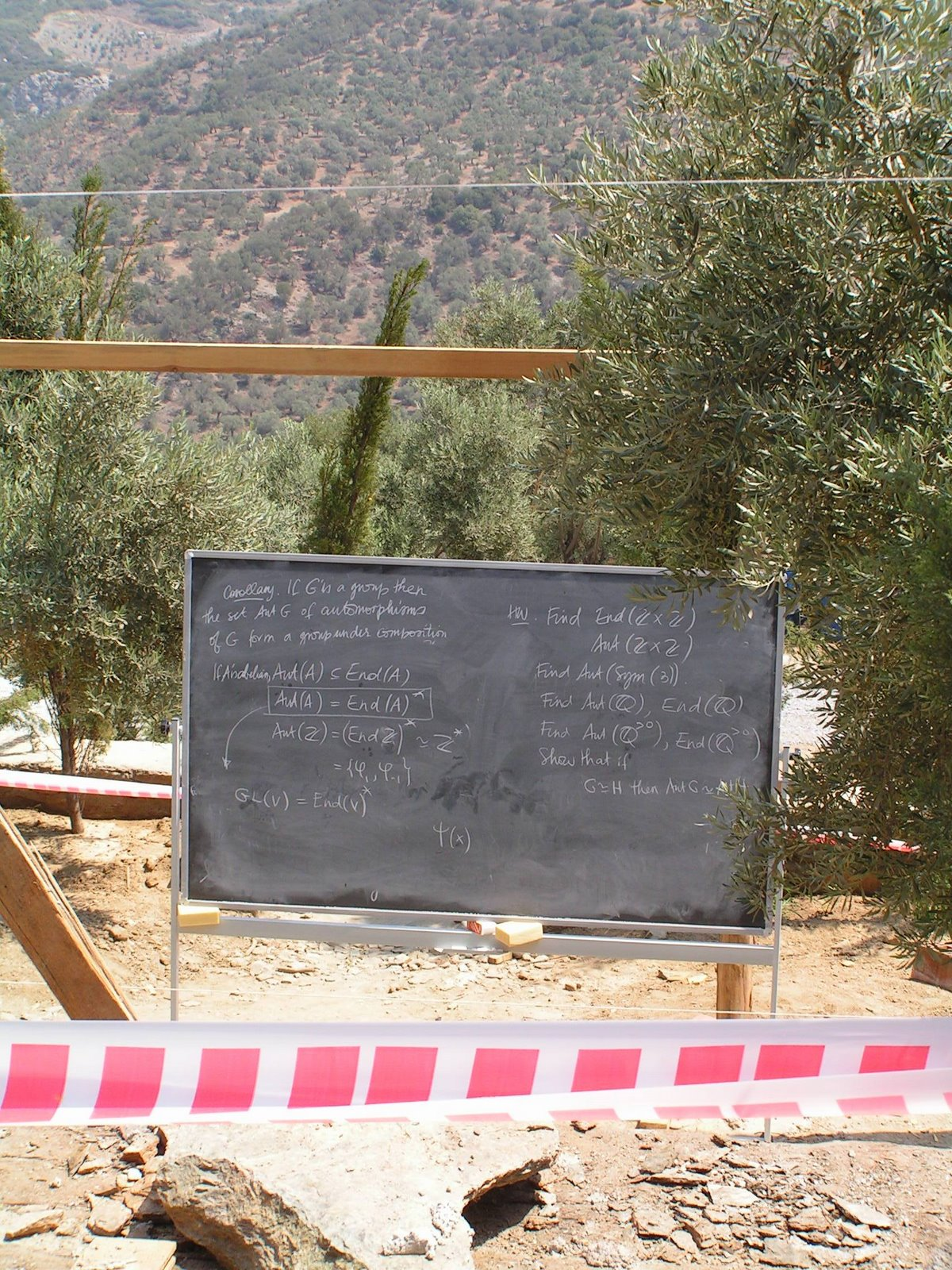
A blackboard of the village cordoned off by police tape, in 2007.

Many places around Şirince are protected areas, but the village is not; still, the construction permit was not granted. Reasons given for the refusal are the absence of officially registered "street", and the interdiction to build an educational institution without the government approval. Another suspected reason is the controversiality of the name "Nesin", dating back from the figure of Aziz Nesin. In July 2007, everyone was forced out of the village by the Jandarma, who came with guns drawn and sealed off buildings. The villagers, representing three dozen people, camped in the nearby woods, which are a former horse burial place filled with bones. Courses continued outdoor, but the Jandarma tried to force them out again. Ali Nesin, who previously tried to keep the project secret because of its illegality, decided to send his personal diary about the school to the journal Radikal. A letter of complaint was written by the mathematician Alexandre Borovik (who was teaching there), signed by 384 scholars and sent to prime minister Recep Tayyip Erdoğan. The village reopened on the 10th of August, 2007. This publicity brought popular support and donations.

Ali Nesin got sued by the state for illegal construction and illegally creating an educational institution. He was acquitted for the first case, and the second one was not settled as of 2019.

==== Demolition scare ====
According to a statement in July 2017 by Tekin Karadağ, the president of the Şirince Environment and Nature Association, Nesin Mathematics Village was slated for demolition by the authorities as being an "illegal construction". However, Harun Abuş, Director of Development and City Planning of Selçuk Municipality, declared that at this moment Nesin Mathematics Village is "not on the demolition calendar".

=== Other villages ===
The Nesin Mathematical Village is still expanding, mostly to build more dormitories but also to host sister villages about philosophy and art. In 2014, when talking about this expansion, Ali Nesin stated that

"the whole valley should be dedicated to education, not a standard one but a 'pirate' one".

In 2013, the village was extended to host the Nesin Philosophy Village, and summer schools started in 2014. Since the same year, it also hosts the Nesin Art Village, founded by Işın Önol.

== Architecture ==
Buildings are mainly made of blocks of stones sealed with a mix of hay and clay, and sometimes of recycled materials (like old train rails and ties). Trees and virginia creeper were planted to provide shadow. Many dogs and cats are roaming free.

As of 2018, the village's territory represents 35,000m², half of it being covered by olive trees. There are sixteen bedrooms, two amphitheaters, four closed and four open-air lecture halls, a library, two Turkish baths, twenty-nine single or double rooms, a kitchen, a cafeteria, a small shop and an observation tower. There is no computer room, as the village tries to nurture student cooperation and avoid distractions.

As of 2019, the village can host up to 500 students. Most of them sleep in tents, as dormitories are not sufficient.

=== Particular buildings ===
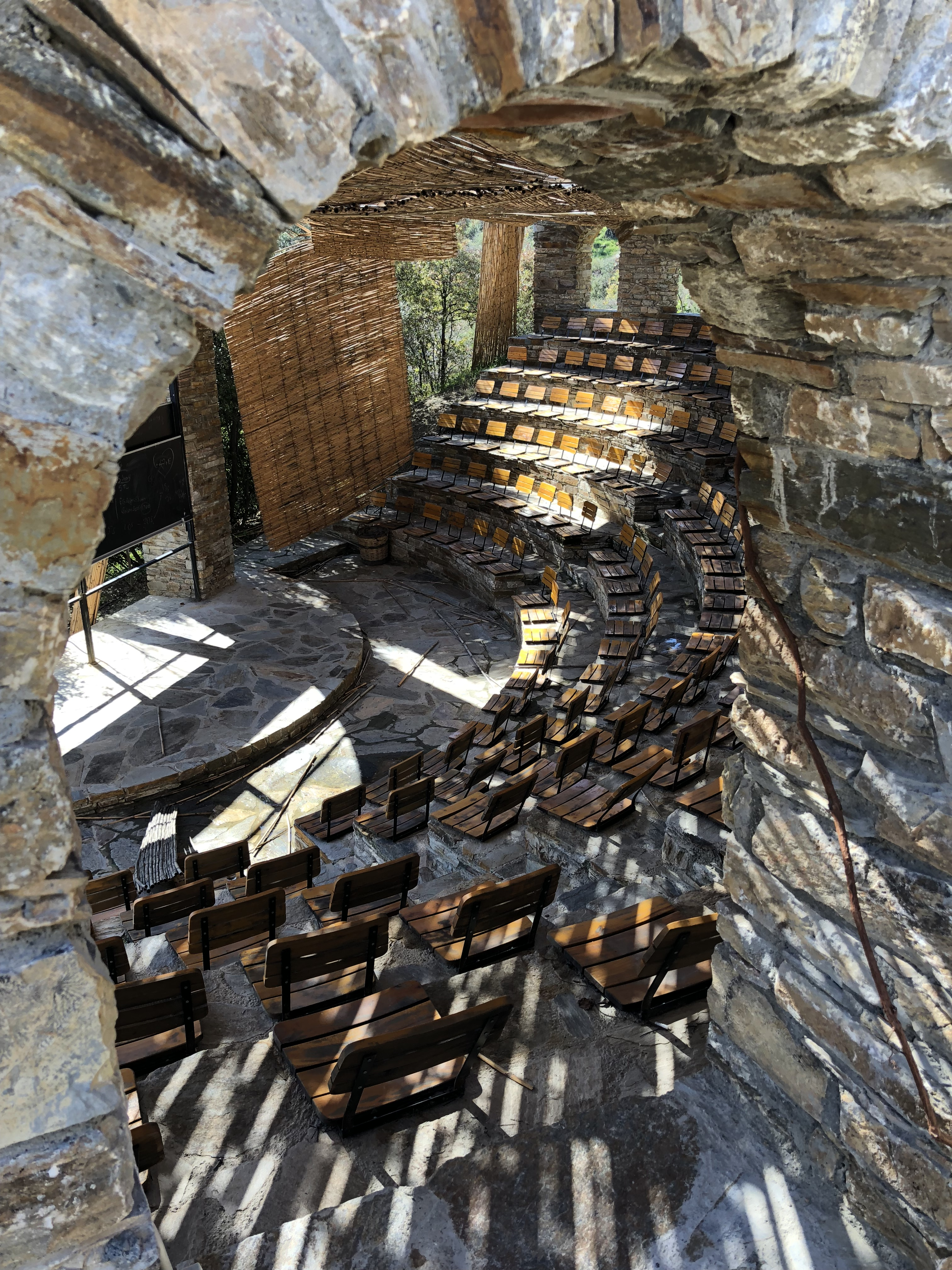
A covered amphitheater.

The first classroom to be built is called the "Langlands shed", named in honor of Robert Langlands. He donated a portion of his Shaw Prize (awarded in 2007) to the village, and did it again when receiving the Abel Prize (2018).

The "Sevan Nişanyan Library" opened its doors on June 15, 2013. It consists of a 150 seats conference room on the ground floor, and mezzanines on the first floor where most of the 15.000 books are stored. It is furnished mostly with donations.

== Functioning ==
=== Logistic organization ===
The village operates on the commune model. Students usually stay in the village for two weeks, and aside from following courses they have to accomplish chores (cleaning, helping the cook, dishwashing, gardening...), most of them being done after lunch. They are organized in groups mixing high school and university students. There is always a student who previously came to the village, and explains the tasks to their groupmates. There is no "supervisor", as the system relies on mutual trust. This provides a sense of collective ownership and community.

High school students, who are usually minors, are placed under the responsibility of a "big brother or sister" who is usually a volunteering university student.

Each Thursday, a vacation activity is organized (usually a visit to Ephesus or a boat tour). There are no TVs, broadcast music nor swimming pool, in order to "protect the village from factors which could be detrimental to concentration". Still, there are ping-pong tables and it is common for students to play live music (usually guitar, saz or kemençe) on the evening, or to project a movie.

Around fifteen paid staff and nearly one hundred volunteers work there every year. A chef supervises three meals a day, plus cake in the afternoon.

=== Economic model ===
A donor recognition wall in the village.

The Mathematics Village is a non-profit organization. There is a "pay what you can" fee for attending summer schools, but there is also an "unquestionable policy" to never refuse anyone for economic reasons, hence the Nesin Foundation provides grants.

Teaching is voluntary. Instructors don't receive an honoraria, but the village provides free accommodations and meals. Thematic summer schools are also the occasion for researchers to collaborate outside of their lecture time.

The village is funded by donations made to the Nesin Foundation. The names of donors (mostly physical persons) are listed on the walls of a building. Another source of money is the local production of olives and oil. The village receives no funding from the Turkish state, but it occasionally does from research institutes (like the TÜBİTAK).

== Mathematical activities ==
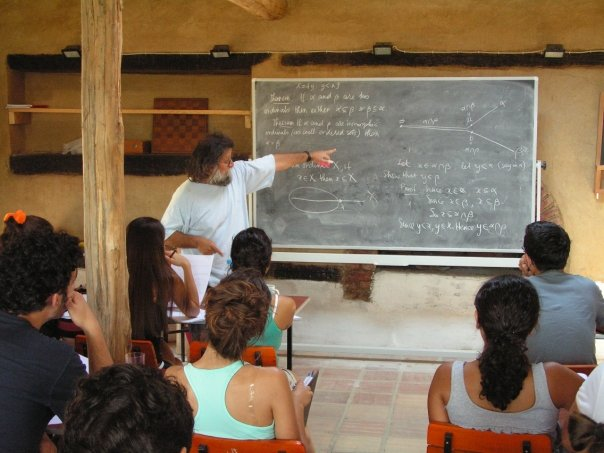
Ali Nesin teaching at the village in 2007.

The original teaching intention of Ali Nesin is to make students active in class. He sums up this goal for autonomy by the moto: "don't look for the answer, look for truth". This is put in opposition with regular Turkish schools, which are supposedly more focus on memorization.

=== Audience ===
The target audience initially consisted of university and PhD students, but it quickly included any education level. Many applications are refused due to the lack of space. In 2017, the village was visited by 10,379 children of the age of 13 or older.

The village also hosts domestic and international research events, and research papers are written there.

=== Content ===
Most of the teaching activity consists in summer schools. Courses span between 6 and 8 hours of the day, and range from high school to graduate university courses. All high school courses are taught in Turkish, as the students do not necessarily know foreign languages, but any undergraduate or postgraduate course may be taught in English. Informal seminars are sometimes held between 9 and 11 p.m. in the "Aziz Nesin Amphitheater". There are no exams nor diplomas delivered.

Many courses are filmed and accessible online, in more than 7,000 videos. In 2010, the Turkish Mathematical Society awarded Ali Nesin a prize for his open source courseware.

Students have reported to appreciate their experience at the village for its distinct approach on instruction, the nurturing of curiosity, the natural environment and the cohabitation with mathematicians.

== Recognition ==
In 2015, Ali Nesin received the 14th "Koç Award for education" from the Vehbi Koç Foundation, for his work at the Nesin Mathematics Village.

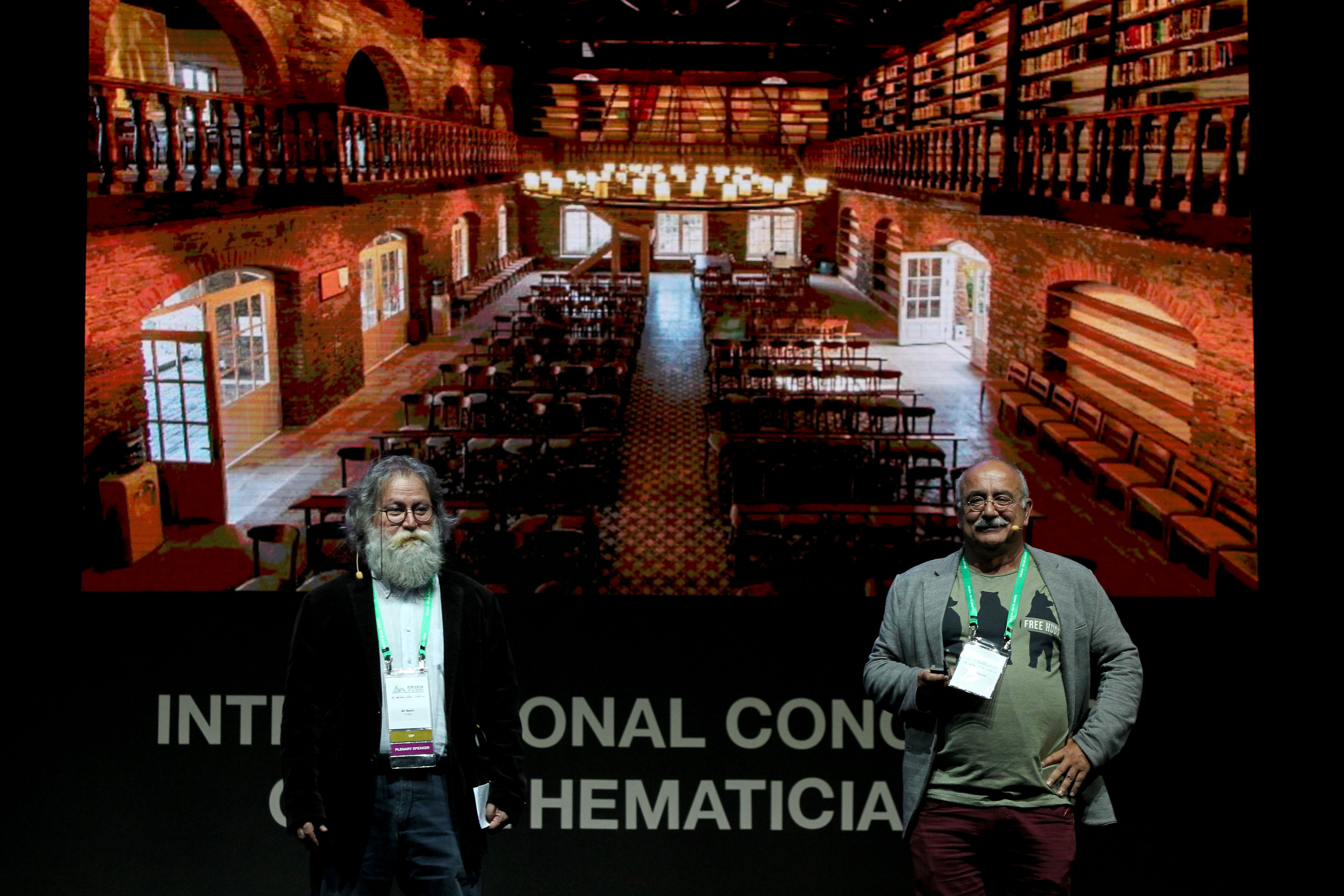
Ali Nesin and Sevan Nişanyan at the ICM 2018, with a picture of the village library behind them.

In 2018, Ali Nesin was bestowed the Leelavati Award at the International Congress of Mathematicians (hosted in Rio de Janeiro) for

"his outstanding contributions towards increasing public awareness of mathematics in Turkey, in particular for his tireless work in creating the 'Mathematical Village' as an exceptional, peaceful place for education, research, and the exploration of mathematics for anyone."

== See also ==
- Open education
- Popular education
