= Işın Önol =

Art curator (born 1977)

- Born: 1977 (age 48–49); Turkey
- Education: MFA, Sabancı University; MAS in Curating, Zürich University of the Arts
- Alma mater: Sabancı University, Zürich University of the Arts
- Occupations: Curator, Writer
- Years active: 2006–present
- Employer(s): School of Visual Arts, Nesin Art Village
- Known for: Curatorial research, Archival practices, Socially engaged art

Işın Önol (born 1977, alternative spelling: Isin Onol) is a New York City and Vienna-based Turkish and Austrian curator of contemporary art. She is the Director of Curatorial Research at the School of Visual Arts in New York City. Between 2006 and 2009, she served as the Director and Curator at Proje4L/Elgiz Museum of Contemporary Art. She is known for her curatorial research focusing on archival information and oral histories, as well as for establishing the Nesin Art Village, as a sister school of The Nesin Mathematics Village.

== Early life and education ==
Önol was born in 1977 in Turkey. She holds an MAS in Curating from Zürich University of the Arts (2009–2011) and an MFA in Visual Arts & Visual Communication Design from Sabancı University, Istanbul (2000–2003). She also participated in the Postgraduate International Curatorial Training Program at L'École du Magasin in Grenoble, France, and in the First Gwangju Biennale International Curatorial Training Program in South Korea in 2009.

== Exhibitions and projects ==
The Zip Code Memory Project (2020–2022): The Zip Code Memory Project, an initiative based at Columbia University, has played a significant role in addressing the impact of the COVID-19 pandemic on vulnerable communities in New York City. The New York Times described the project as an effort to "use art to help New York heal, particularly from the disparate impact of the pandemic on vulnerable communities." The project focuses on community engagement, addressing collective grief and rage through workshops, public events, and the Imagine Repair exhibition, which was curated by Önol at the Cathedral of St. John the Divine. Additionally, the project's methodology combines artistic and theatrical practices with a broad theoretical and holistic understanding of trauma and grief. Participating artists included Kamal Badhey, Jordan Cruz, Maria José Contreras, Rafael Lozano-Hemmer, Chelsea Knight, Susan Meiselas, Lorie Novak, Desiree Rios, Carrie Mae Weems, Deborah Willis, and participants of the Zip Code Memory Project. Performers and speakers included Alicia Grullon, Marie Howe, Fred Moten, Amyra Léon, Rev. Juan Carlos Ruiz, George Emilio Sanchez, Noni Carter, Imani Uzuri, and a concert by Reverend Billy and the Stop Shopping Choir.

Sinopale - International Sinop Biennial: Önol has been a key figure in the Sinopale, the International Sinop Biennial in Sinop, Turkey, serving on the curatorial and organizational team during the 2012, 2014, and 2021-2022 editions. The biennial is known for its focus on socially engaged art practices that involve local communities and address issues of cultural memory and identity.

Bilgé: Lifespan of a Horizontal Line (2023): In February 2023, Önol curated this posthumous exhibition of Turkish-American artist Bilgé Friedlaender at SAPAR Contemporary in New York City. The exhibition is a collaboration with the artist's estate and focuses on rare and previously unseen works on paper from the 1970s.

Words Numbers Lines: Work of Bilgé Friedlaender (2016–2017): Held at Arter in Istanbul, this comprehensive retrospective exhibition presented the minimalist work of Bilgé Friedlaender from the 1970s, focusing on her artistic vocabulary and "her use of basic forms and shapes to ask complex questions." TRT World highlighted the exhibition as showcasing "Bilgé Friedlaender's solo exhibition entitled 'Words, Numbers, Lines' between 14 October 2016 and 15 January 2017." As noted in Frieze, the exhibition "covers a momentous decade (1975–83) of her underappreciated practice, exposing the personal vocabulary she developed in her eponymous 1977 artist's book, including 'string’, ‘tear’ and ‘torn’." In his article *Art that Resists Being Pigeonholed by Nationality* in Hyperallergic, Ari Akkermans wrote, “Escaping from the rigid formalism of classical art school, finding a space of freedom in the hard-edge abstraction of 1960s America (...) and working outside the studio, collecting materials from the world; they rejected the analytical figuration prevalent in Turkey at the time. In terms of reception, Friedlaender was very active in the US during the crucial 60s, she was based outside of New York City, and she was virtually unknown until her ARTER exhibition in 2016."

When Home Won't Let You Stay (2016): This exhibition, held in Vienna, addressed urgent issues of displacement, human rights, and the politics of coexistence. The project involved close collaboration with individuals from Syria and Iraq who had fled their homes, using art to create spaces of empathy and understanding amidst a humanitarian crisis. A publication, handcrafted by the project participants, accompanied the exhibition as one of the participatory artworks designed by Bernhard Cella.

Women Mobilizing Memory (2014–2019): This multi-year, transdisciplinary project explored the intersection of memory, trauma, and social activism, with exhibitions and events held in various cities around the world. The project focused on how women mobilize memory to address global human rights issues, particularly in contexts of violence and displacement. The artists in this series of iterations include Simone Leigh, Gülsün Karamustafa, Susan Meiselas, Lorie Novak, Kameelah Janan Rasheed, and Deborah Willis, among others.

Women Mobilizing Memory: Women Witnessing (2014): Held at Depo in Istanbul, Turkey, from September 5 to October 3, 2014, this iteration of the project focused on feminist interpretations of memory and witnessing.

Mobilizing Memory – Vienna (2015): The Vienna iteration took place at Kunsthalle Exnergasse, WUK, from March 18 to April 3, 2015. This exhibition commemorated the Armenian Genocide and explored how memory can serve as a form of resistance.

Collaborative Archives: Connective Histories (2015): Held at LeRoy Neiman Gallery, Columbia University, from September 8 to 18, 2015, this exhibition examined the role of collaborative archives in connecting historical narratives across different communities. This project continued the exploration of memory as a tool for social and political engagement, particularly in the context of collective histories.

Women Mobilizing Memory: Arts of Intervention (2019): This iteration took place at Complutense University of Madrid, Spain, on June 26–27, 2019, under the title "Arts of Intervention."

== Selected publications ==
- "The Pebble's Precedence" (September 2024): Essay in Yasemin Özcan's solo exhibition publication Wet Floor, which will be on view at Arter's ground floor gallery from 19 September 2024 to 6 April 2025. A publication which includes texts by Evrim Kaya, Önol, and Kaya Genç, as well as an interview between the curator and the artist accompanied the exhibition.
- "On Challenging the Grotesqueness of Normalcy" (May 2024): Essay in Ipek Duben’s Monograph İpek Duben: The Skin, Body and I, edited by Vasif Kortun and published by Salt Istanbul. “Önol approaches Duben's 'in-betweenness' about the socioeconomic, political, and artistic contexts of Turkey and the USA, where the artist has lived for extended periods.”
- "Conditions of Objection" (May 2021): Essay in “Mario Rizzi: Bayt” Centro Pecci. “With an interview by Cristiana Perrella to Mario Rizzi, critical essays by Hamid Dabashi, Stephanie Bailey, Önol, and Simone Frangi, and further documentary material.”
- "Flamboyant Transparency" (November 2020): This book chapter is included in Maja Vukoje. On the Edge, a monograph published on the occasion of Maja Vukoje's most comprehensive solo exhibition at Belvedere 21 in Vienna. The text explores Vukoje's distinct artistic language, which focuses on the mixture and fusion of elements from different cultures as visual motifs.
- “Blank: An Attempt at a Conversation" (August 2019): A collaborative book chapter co-authored with Susan Meiselas, with contributions by Bilal, Zarife Bitim, Leyla Demir, Nejbir Erkol, Elif Kaya, and Zeynep Öztap. This chapter is part of Women Mobilizing Memory, a book that “emerges from a multiyear feminist collaboration bringing together an interdisciplinary group of scholars, artists, and activists from Chile, Turkey, and the United States. The essays in this book assemble and discuss a deep archive of works that activate memory across a variety of protest cultures, ranging from seemingly minor acts of defiance to broader resistance movements.”
- "Art Production in Turkey from the 1980s to Today" (July 2018): An interview with Hale Tenger conducted by Önol, featured in the book Authoritarianism and Resistance in Turkey: Conversations on Democratic and Social Challenges. This book brings together critical analyses of Turkey's recent history, addressing key issues such as gender inequality, Islamism, and urban regeneration. The interview format allows for a concise yet insightful exploration of Turkey's complex ideologies and events, featuring perspectives from leading Turkish intellectuals and academics.

== Associations and memberships ==
Önol is a member of several professional organizations, including the International Association of Curators of Contemporary Art (IKT) and the International Association of Art Critics (AICA). She also served on the Board of Directors of the Roberto Cimetta Fund, which supports the mobility of artists in the Mediterranean region from 2018 to 2024.
