= Şirince =

Village in İzmir Province, Turkey

Şirince Kirkintzes
- Neighbourhood
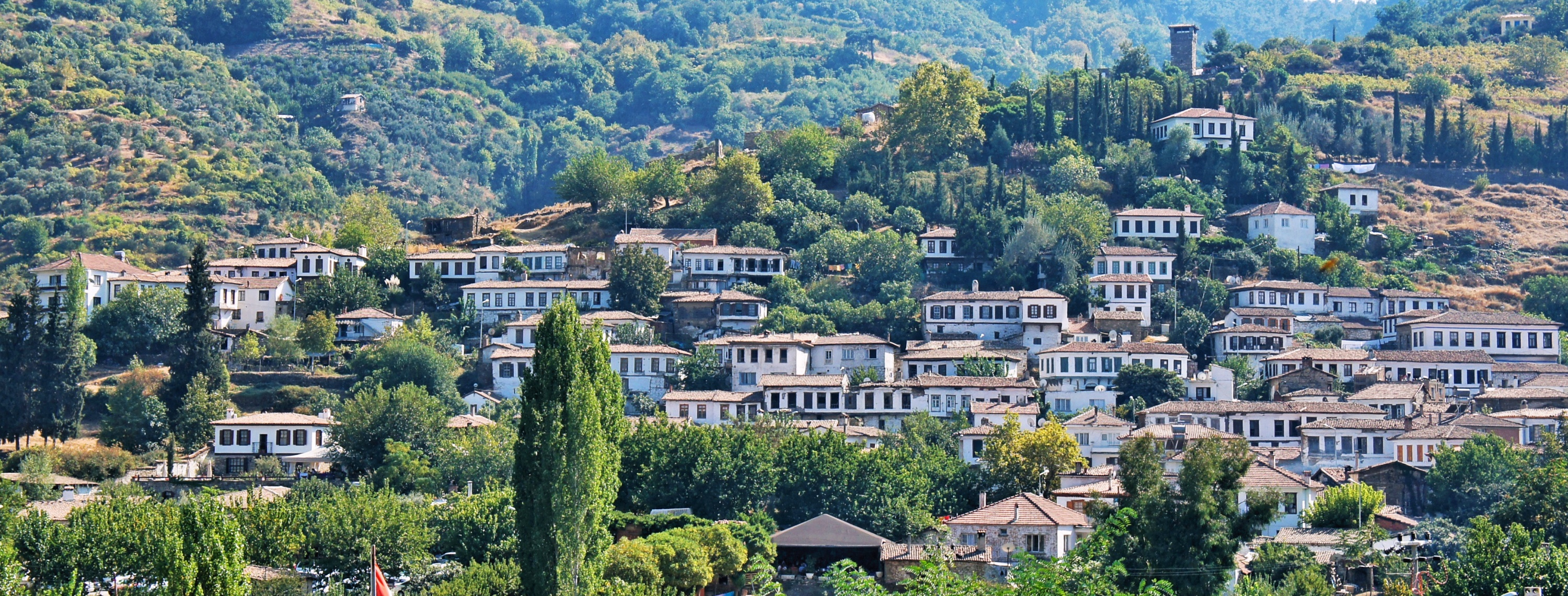
- An overview of Şirince

- Location within Turkey Location within İzmir
- Coordinates: 37°56′29″N 27°25′59″E
- Country: Turkey
- Province: İzmir
- District: Selçuk
- Population (2022): 456
- Time zone: UTC+3 (TRT)
- Area code: 0232

Şirince (pronounced [ʃiˈɾindʒe]), also known as Kirkintzes (Greek: Κιρκιντζές), is a neighbourhood in the municipality and district of Selçuk, İzmir Province, Turkey. Its population is 456 (2022). It is about 8 kilometres (5 mi) east of the town Selçuk and about 8 kilometres from Ephesus. The area around the village has history dating back to Hellenistic period (323–31 BC). Pottery finds made around the village between 2001 and 2002 by Ersoy and Gurler indicate the presence of seven villages and nine farmsteads in the area dating back to ancient and medieval times. On the road up you will see the remains of several Roman aqueducts as the village was an important water source for ancient Ephesus.

Today the village prospers through agriculture (olive oil, peaches, wine) and tourism. It is well protected and a rare example of Ottoman Christian architecture.

== History ==
Şirince prospered when Ephesus was abandoned in the 15th century but most of what one sees today dates from the 19th century. There is a story that the village was settled by freed Greek slaves who named the village Çirkince (meaning "Ugly" in Turkish) to deter others from following them. There is an alternative suggestion made by Cahit Tecli that the village takes its name from the nomadic Turcoman tribe which appears in Ottoman registers as Cirkin, Cirkinlu, Cirkinoglu, Cirkitali and Cirkitulu. (The village's name was changed to Şirince (meaning "Pleasant") in 1926 by the governor of Izmir Province.)

According to an Ottoman account from 1650 there were only 18 tax paying individuals in Cirkince, all of whom were Orthodox Christians. In 1699 an English priest, Edmund Chishull visited the village and says that the whole population was Christian.

A nineteenth century visitor, Arundell, who came to the village twice in 1832 and 1833, states "the village is a considerable one, of at least 300 houses, all Greek: the principal language of the village is Turkish, though they know something of their own tongue". He notes that the women "dressed in the Turkish manner, covering their faces"....and the men "all armed as the Turks, with pistols and yatagan (a type of long knife) and are renowned for having killed a lot of pirates from the island of Samos". He estimated the population as "probably fifteen hundred persons".

The village was a successful agricultural community growing vines, tobacco, figs, olives and vegetables. They had sheep goats, dairy cows and bee hives.

By 1908/1909 the yearbook (Salname) states that the village had more than 1,000 houses, all inhabited by Greek Orthodox Christians. "Their mother tongue is Turkish and they speak it with an ancient dialect".

The Ottoman administration in the area continued until 1919 when the invading Greek army took control and remained in charge until 1922.

As Sirince declined Selcuk began to prosper. Until the 1950s the population of Sirince remained at 2,000- 3,000 but families increasingly moved to Selcuk.

== House of Mary ==
A building known as the House of Mary (Ottoman Turkish: پناغى قپىلى Panaya Kapulu), about 17 km outside of Şirince, is venerated by Catholic Christians as well as Muslims. The Christians, descended from the first churches in Ephesus, had a tradition of venerating the building long before foreigners tracked it down in 1881 (using descriptions seen by Bl. Anne Catherine Emmerich in a vision).

== Restoration projects ==
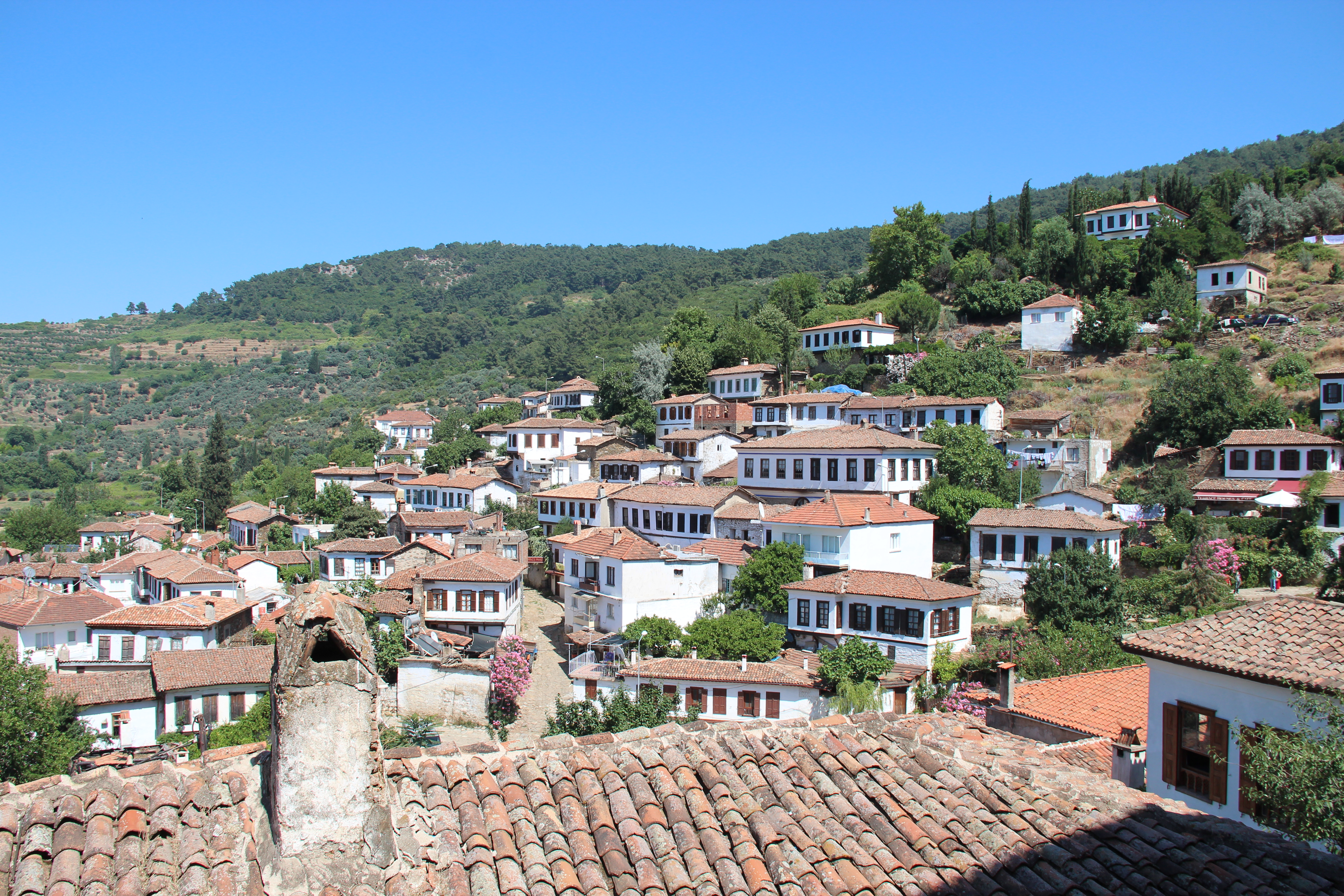
A view of Şirince

In the 1990s the well-known Istanbul linguist Sevan Nişanyan and his wife Müjde Tönbekici settled in Şirince, which was semi-derelict. They were instrumental in having the village declared a national heritage site, and they undertook to renovate ruined historic houses using the original materials and building techniques of the village.

Several of the renovated village houses were eventually converted into a highly acclaimed Hotel de Charme by the name of the Nisanyan Houses.

Since then many villagers have restored their homes and operate them as small hotels and guest houses. There is accommodation to suit every pocket and the village is well served with many restaurants.

== Mathematics village ==
Nişanyan also built Theatre Madrasa (in Turkish Tiyatro Medresesi), a theater institute and actors’ retreat in the manner of mediaeval Muslim seminaries. The Nişanyan Memorial Library was completed in 2013.

Nişanyan also cooperated with Ali Nesin, a prominent mathematician and philanthropist to build the Nesin Mathematics Village near Şirince. Constructed strictly along the lines of traditional Aegean rural architecture, the village offers summer courses in college-level and postgraduate mathematics. It attracts prominent lecturers from around the world, accommodating over 300 resident students by summer 2013. A philosophy school became operative on the grounds of Mathematics Village in 2014.

== Doomsday safe haven ==
Şirince acquired world-wide fame when tourists flocked to the village in December 2012 to witness the Mayan Apocalypse, as New Age mystics believed its "positive energy" would aid in weathering the catastrophe, during the 2012 phenomenon.
