= Sevan Nişanyan =

Turkish-Armenian writer and linguist (born 1956)

- Սեւան Նշանեան
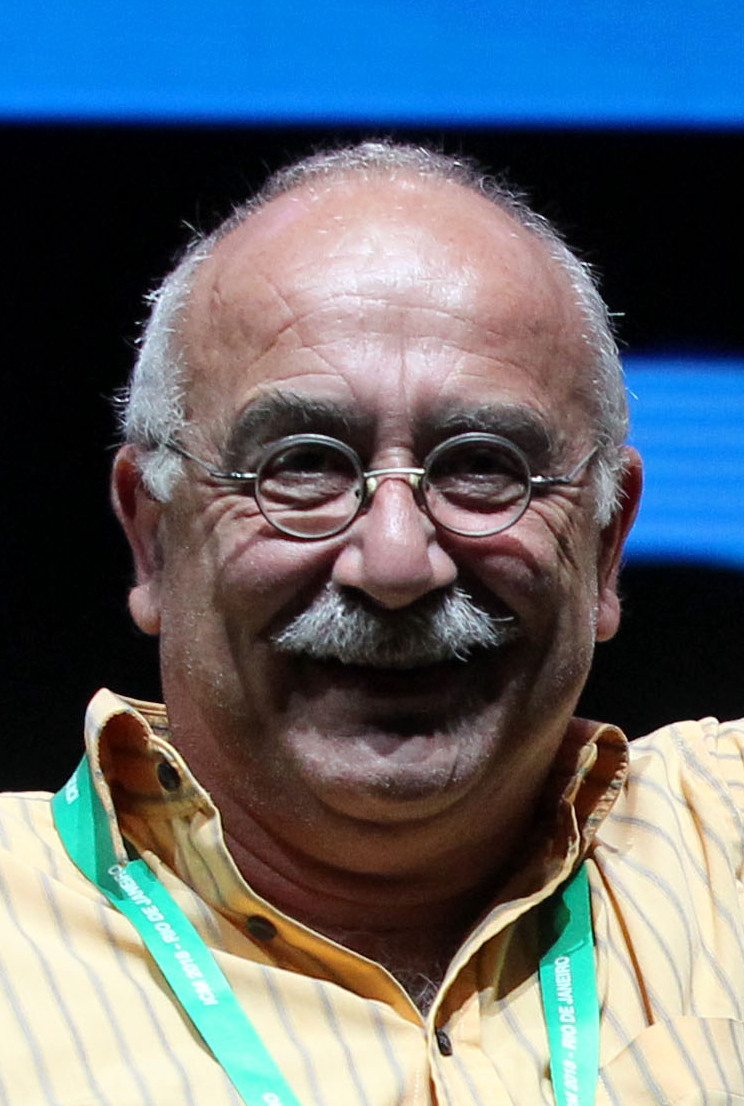
- Nişanyan in 2018
- Born: Sevan Bedros Nişanyan; 21 December 1956 (age 69); Istanbul, Turkey
- Citizenship: Turkey; Armenia
- Education: Armenian School of Pangaltı; Robert College
- Alma mater: Yale University (BA); Columbia University (MA)
- Occupations: Journalist; writer; linguist
- Notable work: Yanlış Cumhuriyet (The Wrong Republic); Nişanyan Sözlük (Etymological Dictionary of Contemporary Turkish), Index Anatolicus
- Criminal charges: Prison sentence of 16 years and 7 months for "building infractions" by Turkish court
- Spouses: Müjde Tönbekici (divorced); Aynur Deniz (divorced); Ira Tzourou (current)
- Children: 5
- Awards: Ayşe Nur Zarakolu Liberty Award of the Turkish Human Rights Association, 2004

Sevan Nişanyan (Western Armenian: Սեւան Նշանեան; born 21 December 1956) is an Armenian writer, fugitive and lexicographer born in Turkey. Author of a number of books, Nişanyan was awarded the Ayşe Nur Zarakolu Liberty Award of the Turkish Human Rights Association in 2004 for his contributions to greater freedom of speech. He is also known for his work to restore Şirince, a semi-derelict village near Turkey's Aegean coast.

Sevan Nişanyan was given a cumulative prison sentence of 16 years and 7 months for building infractions, and for allegedly insulting the Islamic prophet Muhammad in a blog entry in September 2012. He escaped from the prison in July 2017 and moved to Athens, where he intended to apply for political asylum, as stated in his interview to the Belgian daily La Libre Belgique. He subsequently went to live in exile in Samos, stating that he is "grateful to the providence that the goatfuckers who run Turkey gave him, unintentionally, this splendid opportunity." He left for Montenegro in protest in 2022 after being briefly declared persona non grata following a conflict with Greek local authorities.

== Early years and education ==
Nişanyan was born in Istanbul in 1956 to an Armenian family. His father was architect Vagarş Nişanyan. After graduating from the Private Armenian School of Pangaltı, he attended Robert College in 1972, then studied philosophy at Yale University in 1979. He did graduate studies in political science at Columbia University, where he worked under Giovanni Sartori, Zbigniew Brzezinski, Seweryn Bialer, and Douglas Chalmers. His unfinished PhD thesis concerned the competitive strategies of political parties in unstable South American regimes. During his university years Nişanyan became fluent in several languages, including Latin, Arabic and Classical Armenian.

== Travel writings and publications ==
Grundrisse, which he translated into Turkish, was published with a hundred-page preface in 1979. His articles appeared in Birikim and in the opinions section of The New York Times.

He is the founder and former manager of the company that brought the Commodore 64 computers to Turkey in the 1980's. He founded Commodore, a computer magazine in Turkish, and wrote articles there under the pen name Baytan Bitirmez.

In October 2021, while visiting Albania, he was reportedly declared persona non grata by the Greek authorities and banned from re-entry, with reason said to be a state secret. His undesirability, according to Athens Voice, was the information passed to the police by local Samos agents as if "the Turk is buying real estate", which, if it happened, would violate the law on non-purchase of real estate by foreigners in some border areas. On January 7, 2022, the Greek justice dismissed the case, prohibiting any deportation to Turkey. Nişanyan went to Montenegro after as a guest of Besim Tibuk. Armenian Embassy in Greece said Nişanyan must leave Greece voluntarily within 15 days according to the court decision, adding that as he is a citizen of Armenia, "he can leave for Armenia if he wishes.”

=== Şirince ===
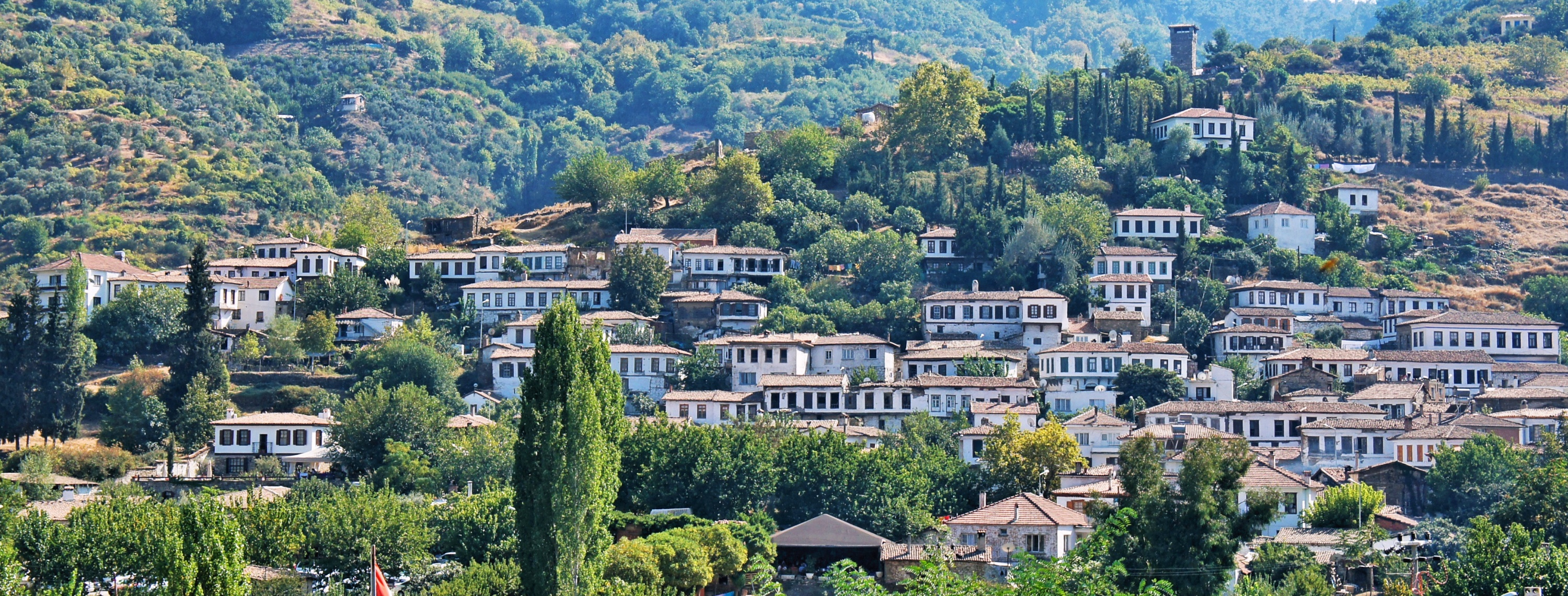
A view of Şirince

Nişanyan married Müjde Tönbekici in 1992. The couple settled in Şirince, a former Greek-majority village in the Aegean hills of Western Turkey which had been semi-derelict since the 1923 population exchange between Greece and Turkey.

Several of the renovated village houses were eventually converted into a highly acclaimed "Hotel de Charme" by the name of the Nişanyan Houses.

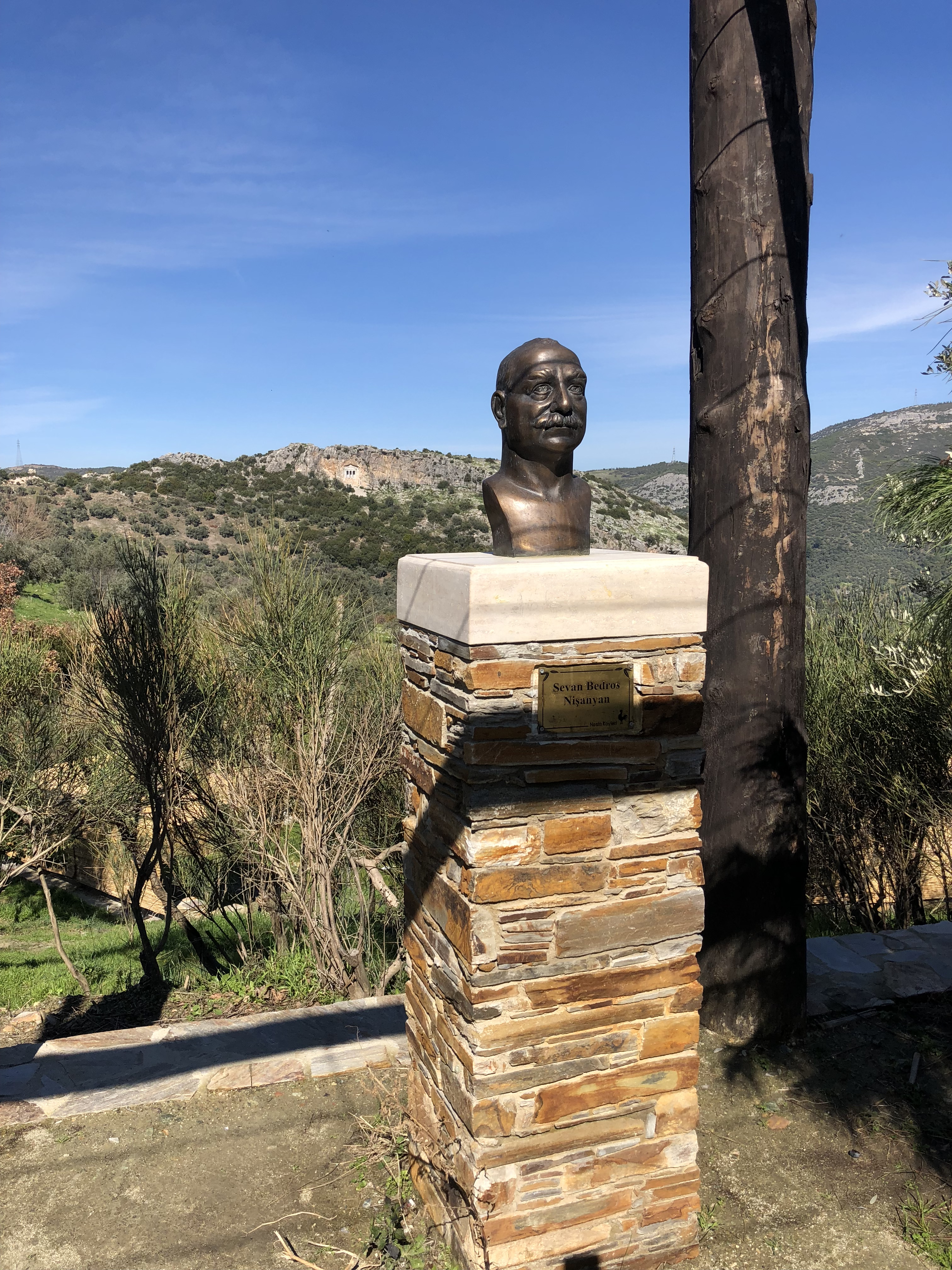
Nişanyan's bust in Nesin Mathematics Village

=== The Etymological Dictionary ===
Nişanyan's Sözlerin Soyağacı: Çağdaş Türkçenin Etimolojik Sözlüğü (Etymological Dictionary of Contemporary Turkish), published in 2002 was the first work in its field. Popularly known as "The Nişanyan Dictionary", a revised and expanded fifth edition was published in 2008. The full contents of the dictionary are available online at nisanyansozluk.com, with new material added on a continuous basis.

=== The Wrong Republic ===
Nişanyan wrote The Wrong Republic (Turkish: Yanlış Cumhuriyet), a critique of the founding myths of the Republic of Turkey, Written in 1994, the book circulated widely in photocopy, until it could be legally published in 2008.

The book also extensively critiques the anti-Western sentiments that are prevalent in Turkey.

The attitude of societies that see no harm in exploiting the products of Western civilization, yet are hostile to that civilization itself . . . can only be described in non-political terms such as immorality and shamelessness. Cuba’s “socialism” falls into this category. Iraq’s, Libya’s, and former Algeria’s “Third Worldism” fall into this category. Iran’s “Islamism” also falls into this category. For a society that can protect itself from the plague and the flu thanks to antibiotics to feel not even a shred of curiosity—let alone love—toward the men who discovered antibiotics and the culture that produced them . . . is a condition that can only be expressed in terms of ignorance and moral decay, not “opinion.”

. . .

The common thread linking the major political movements that dominate the generations educated under the Republic is hostility toward the West: Islamism, Nationalism, and Socialism are all united in their desire to close off Turkey’s horizons to the societies that have created the universal civilization.

=== Nişanyan Yeradları (formerly Index Anatolicus) ===
In 2010, Nişanyan published a toponymic study that documents the historical origins and linguistic roots of geographical names in Turkey. The study examines place names from various languages, including Turkish, Greek, Armenian, Kurdish, and others, providing insights into their etymology and historical changes. The project also tracks modifications to place names over time, particularly those changed during the 20th century under the Turkification policies of the Turkish Republic.

The project went online in 2010, and developed into an effort to document all the historic toponyms of Turkey and neighboring countries. The current database includes over 75.500 mapped place-names and can be viewed online at nisanyanyeradlari.com.

== Rock Tomb ==
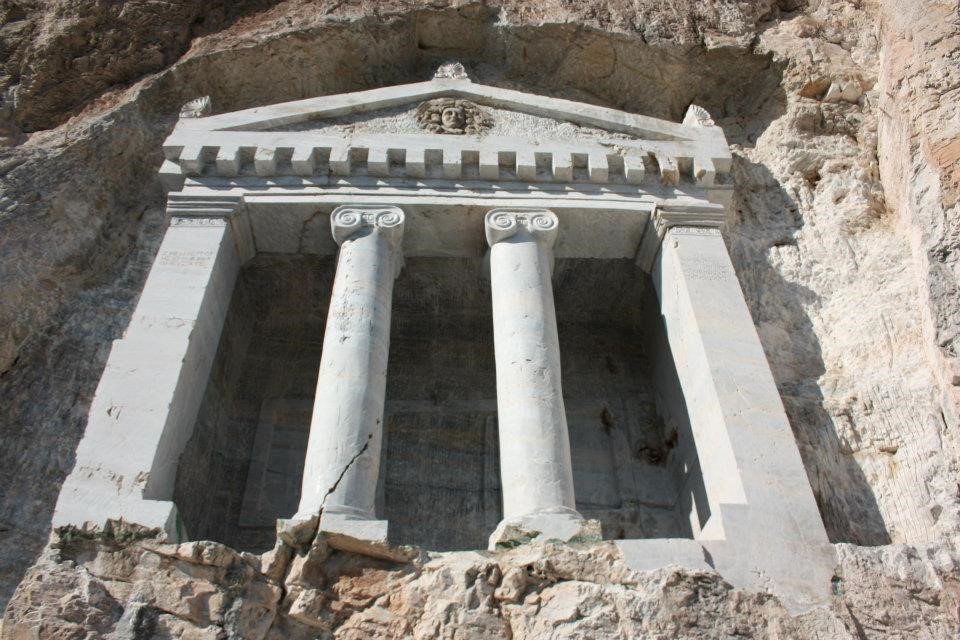
The "Rock Tomb" in Şirince.

In 2012, Nişanyan unveiled his Rock Tomb, an Ionic order facade in the manner of ancient Lycian rock tombs, measuring eight by five metres, carved into a limestone cliff facing the Nesin Mathematics Village near Şirince. The carving was done using hand tools, and took three years to complete. Nişanyan drew up the design and contributed much of the labor. The tomb was inaugurated with a ceremony, in which unlimited wine, halva and tea were served. The ceremony was attended by approximately 200 people, including Ali Nesin, the founder of Nesin Mathematics Village.

== Legal issues ==
Nişanyan was handed a cumulative jail sentence of 16 years and 7 months for several crimes including illegal construction in a protected nature zone in Şirince. He was imprisoned on 2 January 2014. After being moved to a lower security prison for good behavior, he escaped on 14 July 2017 and fled to Greece.

=== Lawsuits filed against him ===
- In 2001, he was sentenced to 10 months in prison under Law No. 2863 for restoring demolished houses in Şirince without official permission. He was convicted.
- In 2008, a group of local Republican People's Party officials pressed criminal charges against him for his criticism of Mustafa Kemal Atatürk, calling him a dictator and his ideology "1920s style fascism".
- In May 2013, the Istanbul 14th Criminal Court of Peace sentenced him to 13 months and 15 days in prison for insulting the Islamic prophet Muhammad. Nişanyan's prison sentence was not converted into a fine due to his previous criminal record.
- In 2008, he started to build a 60 square metre stone building on his land in a protected area. Although the construction was sealed, he finished the building by removing the seal twice. He surrendered to Torbalı Open Prison on 2 December 2014 to serve his 2-year prison sentence for this reason. He was sent to Buca Closed Prison on 26 February 2014. It was claimed that he was made to sleep on a stone floor and was not allowed to take a bath. Nişanyan was transferred to Aydın Yenipazar Closed Prison on 7 July 2014 after he requested to be transferred from Şakran Prison, where he had been transferred for the second time, citing his lack of life safety. On 18 September 2015, he was transferred to Sultanhisar Open Prison. From there, he was sent to the closed section of Söke Prison on the grounds that he had violated prison rules. His sentence of 6 years and 6 months of imprisonment, which had been previously approved, was added to his conviction, increasing his execution period to 11 years and 1 month.
- In 2011, he was sentenced to 3 years and 4 months in prison for two separate Illegal construction cases.
- Nişanyan was sentenced to 11 days of solitary confinement on the grounds that he was found with a mobile modem device and a flash drive, which are prohibited in prison. Nişanyan, who took advantage of his 15-day legal right after the notification of the decision, submitted his objection to Söke Execution Judgeship with the help of his lawyer. Nişanyan's appeal case was held on 25 February 2015. Nişanyan's lawyers Ergin Cilmen, Arif Ali Cangı and Murat Arçı, Ali Nesin and 30 members of the Izmir Freedom of Thought Association attended the hearing held at the Söke Civil Court of Peace. Nişanyan attended the hearing from prison via teleconference system and stated that he did not accept the accusations against him. Nişanyan was accused of offering a bribe of 10 thousand Turkish liras and a car to the prison guards, Nişanyan denied this accusation and claimed that he does not have a car, so he wouldn't be able to give one as a bribe.
- On 14 July 2017, Nişanyan announced his escape from prison on Twitter stating: "The bird has flown away. I wish the same for the rest of the 80 million people. (in Turkey)."

== Personal life ==
Nişanyan has been married four times, to Corinna-Barbara Francis (1981-1985), Müjde Tönbekici (1992-2008), Aynur Deniz (2009-2011) and to Ira Tzourou, who he married on 5 May 2019 in Samos. He has 5 children. He describes himself as an "outspoken Atheist."

In 2026, Nişanyan disowned his son, Arsen Nişanyan, over a dispute regarding Nişanyan Hotel.

== Controversies ==
Nişanyan has been constantly under criticism for his controversial comments and behaviour on various topics. The earlier of those critiques relate to his commentary that was criticized for justifying sexual abuse and bullying.

He emptied a jar of his dried feces over his ex-wife Müjde Tonbekici (who first thought it was earth and later called the Gendarmerie to document the incident). Nişanyan called this a "symbolic gesture that does not involve violence". This resulted in widespread backlash from the public. Calls to cancel his column on Agos newspaper was rejected by newspaper management.

After the 2020 Elazığ earthquake, Nişanyan tweeted that "Elazığ is the most bigoted, ignorant, most paranoid, and sexually obsessed city of Turkey where material and spiritual rape culture prevails. The city is based on a seized property, and is a prison of denied identities. It's a pity for the children though, they are innocent."

In regard to the murder of school principal İbrahim Oktugan, Nişanyan stated: "It is right that someone who knowingly and willfully takes the life of a young person should be punished proportionately. In some circumstances, killing can be a method. In my 11 years of school life, I have known maybe 60 teachers. At least 20 of them were complex, sadistic, ignorant, conniving assholes. I always blame myself for not having the courage to kill even one of them.", adding on, he stated "I don't know the murdered Mr. İbrahim. But I know the poster behind him well." referring to a picture of Oktugan in front of an Atatürk corner, which is mandatory to be placed according to the regulations of Ministry of National Education.

On 31 August 2024, Nişanyan stated: "I regret that the name of Nişanyan has been defamed by your hotel" in regard to the 30 August Victory Day commemorations of the staff and guests at the Nişanyan Hotel in Şirince which was shared on the official account of the hotel as "A very emotional moment".

== Books ==
- Basit Türkiye Tarihi (2025) ISBN 978-625-6267-23-7
- Türkiye’nin Ermeni Coğrafyası (2024) ISBN 978-625-6982-90-1
- Kıyamet Kopmayınca Ne Olur? / Pazar Sohbetleri 5 (2023)
- Dünyanın En Kötü Oteli Nerede? / Pazar Sohbetleri 4 (2023)
- İnsanlar Nasıl Koyunlaştı? / Pazar Sohbetleri 3 (2023)
- Evrende Kaç Yozgat Var? / Pazar Sohbetleri 2 (2023)
- Gemici Henri Türkiye’yi Nasıl Batırdı? / Pazar Sohbetleri 1 (2023)
- Türkiye Kişi Adları Sözlüğü (2021)
- Cezaevi Yazıları (2021)
- Halim İle Selim / Tanrılar ve Dinler Üzerine Bir Tartışma (2021)
- Nişanyan Sözlük Çağdaş Türkçenin Etimolojisi (2020)
- Türkiye Yer Adları Sözlüğü (2020)
- Sürgün Yazıları (2020)
- Swami Dayananda Saraswati’nin Kuran Eleştirisi (2019)
- İyimser Zamanlar (2018)
- Ağır Kitap (Heavy Book) - (2014)
- Aslanlı Yol (Lion Road) - (2012) ISBN 978-975-6201-70-1
- Şirince Meydan Muharebelerinin Mufassal Tarihçesi (Detailed History of the Şirince Pitched Battles) - (2011)
- Hocam, Allaha Peygambere Laf Etmek Caiz Midir? (Master, is it permissible to insult God and the Prophet?) - (2010)
- Adını Unutan Ülke (The Country That Forgot Its Name) - (2010)
- Kelimebaz 2 (Vocabularybase 2) - (2010)
- Kelimebaz 1 (Vocabularybase 1) - (2009)
- Yanlış Cumhuriyet / Atatürk ve Kemalizm Üzerine 51 Soru (The Wrong Republic / 51 Questions on Atatürk and Kemalism) - (2008) ISBN 975-9169-77-0
- Eastern Turkey, A Travelers Handbook (2006)
- Elifin Öküzü ya da Sürprizler Kitabı (Elif's Ox or The Book of Surprises) - (2002) ISBN 975-418-744-4
- Sözlerin Soyağacı: Çağdaş Türkçenin Etimolojik Sözlüğü (Genealogy of Words: Etymological Dictionary of Contemporary Turkish) - (2002)
- Black Sea, A Travelers’ Handbook (2000)
- The Undiscovered Places of Turkey (2000)
- The Little Hotel Book (1998/2008) ISBN 975-521-376-7
- American Express Guide: Prague, Mitchell Beazley (1993)
- American Express Guide: Vienna and Budapest, Mitchell Beazley (1992)
- American Express Guide: Athens and the Classical Sites, Mitchell Beazley (1991)
- Travels Bugs Turkey (1992)
- Karl Marx: Grundrisse, Ekonomi Politiğin Eleştirisi için Ön Çalışma (Karl Marx: Grundrisse, Preliminary Study for the Critique of Political Economy) - (1980)
- Ankara'nın Doğusundaki Türkiye (Turkey to the East of Ankara) - (2006) ISBN 975-23-0196-7
- Herkesin Bilmediği Olağanüstü Yerler (Extraordinary Places Not Everyone Knows) - (2000) ISBN 975-521-377-5
- Mavi Kıyılarda Yeme İçme Sanatı (The Art of Eating and Drinking on the Blue Shores) - (1998) ISBN 975-7143-23-5
- 100 Güzel Kelime (100 Beautiful Words) - (2016)
- Halim ile Selim (Halim and Selim) - (2018)
- İyimser Zamanlar (Optimistic Times) - (2018)
