= Erol Önderoğlu =

Turkish-French journalist

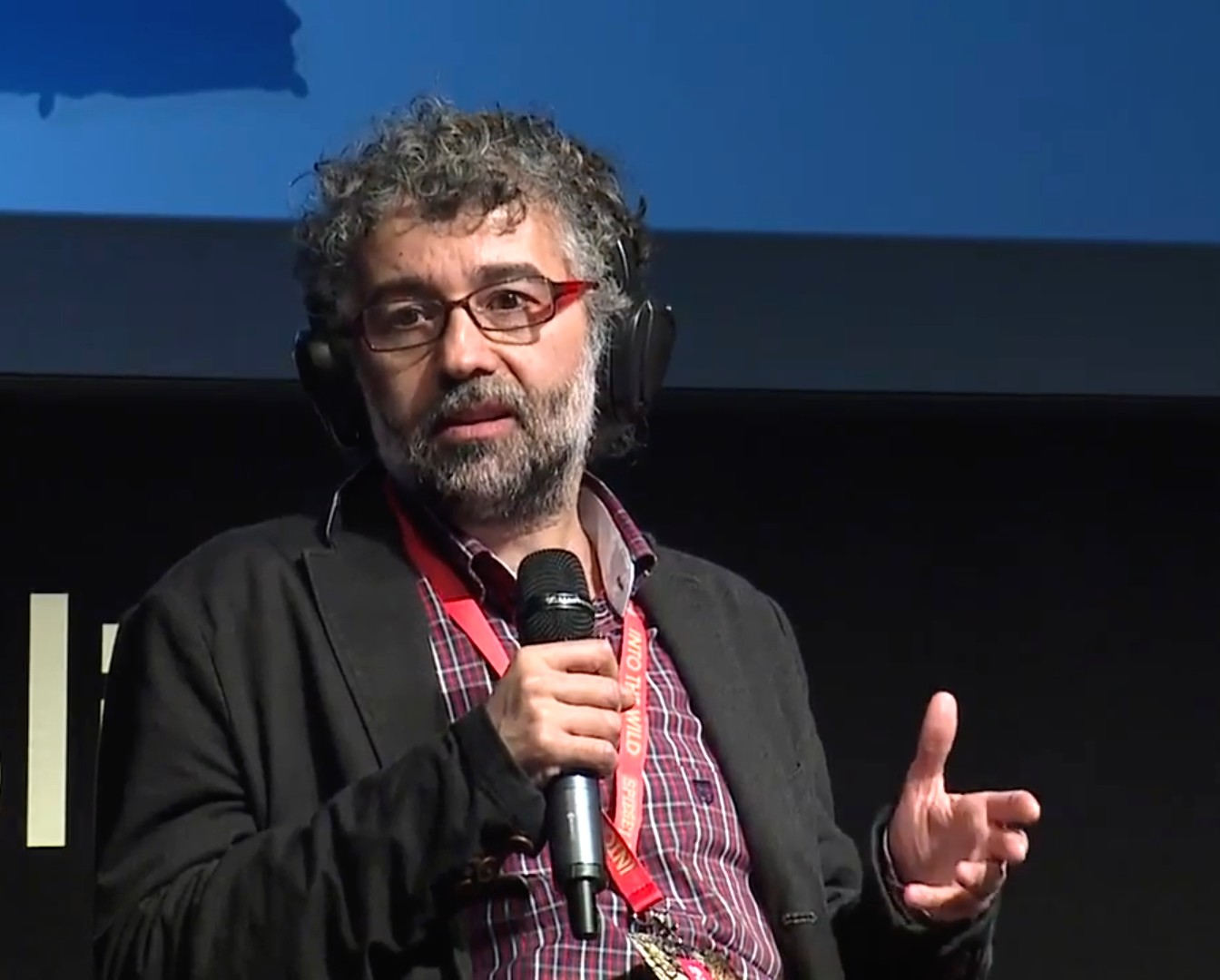
- Erol Önderoğlu (2014)
- Born: 1969 (age 56–57)
- Citizenship: French
- Occupations: Journalist, representative of Reporters Without Borders (RSF)

Erol Önderoğlu (born 1969) is a Turkish-French journalist, and a representative of Reporters Without Borders (Reporters Sans Frontières, RSF). In 2016, he was arrested by the Turkish government for his work supporting Ozgur Gundem, a Kurdish newspaper, and accused of supporting terrorists; his arrest was widely criticized as suppression of freedom of the press.

== Early life and professional career ==
Önderoğlu spent his childhood in France, and is fluent in French. He met his wife, who is also of Turkish descent, in France; the couple have a son. Önderoğlu is a French citizen. He began campaigning for the RSF, which monitors and promotes freedom of the press, after the torture and murder of Metin Göktepe in police custody in 1996. He has been a representative of RSF in Turkey for approximately 20 years. He has also served as the monitoring editor for Turkish press agency Bianet, for whom he began working in 1997. His work for Bianet included quarterly reports on free speech in Turkey. In 2018, he was a member of the jury for the Metin Göktepe journalism awards.

== Prosecution ==
In June 2016 Önderoğlu was arrested after attending a meeting for Ozgur Gundem, a Kurdish newspaper, on World Press Freedom Day. Journalist Ahmet Nesin and scholar Sebnem Korur Fincanci (head of the Turkish Human Rights foundation), who participated in the meeting with Önderoğlu, were also arrested, and were accused of spreading "terrorism propaganda" in favor of the Kurdistan Workers' Party. The three men had taken turns symbolically taking over the leadership of the newspaper to protest its harassment by the government. The Turkish government of Recep Tayyip Erdogan accused the newspaper of spreading Kurdish "terrorism propaganda" and shut it down in August 2016. It is one of dozens of news organizations that have been forced to close by the government since the 2016 Turkish coup d'état attempt, while the Cumhuriyet, the country's oldest mainstream newspaper, had its offices raided and its editors arrested. The number of newspapers shut down by the government has been estimated as 170.

Önderoğlu was in jail for 10 days, and is scheduled to be tried in June 2017: the prosecution is asking for a 14-year prison sentence. He is among 150 journalists who have been jailed or are facing trials, for reasons varying from "terrorism propaganda" to "insulting the president". Reacting to the arrest of Önderoğlu, Nesin, and Fincanci, officials of the European Union stated that the arrest went "against Turkey's commitment to respect the fundamental rights, including freedom of media", and that it went against the Turkish government's obligations with respect to its effort to obtain EU membership. The trial of the three activists was also criticized by human rights organizations Amnesty International and Human Rights Watch.

== Recognition ==
In 2019, Önderoğlu received the Four Freedoms Award for freedom of speech from the Roosevelt Foundation; the foundation cited his "tireless and persistent dedication to defend the freedom of speech and expression".
