= Ahmet Nesin =

Turkish journalist

- Born: 1957 (age 68–69); Istanbul, Turkey
- Occupations: Journalist, politician, writer
- Movement: Social realism
- Spouse: Hilal Nesin (m. 2013)
- Relatives: Aziz Nesin (father); Ali Nesin (brother)

Ahmet Nesin (born 1957, Istanbul) is a Turkish journalist, writer, and human rights advocate known for his work on press freedom and for his involvement in the 2016 “Editors-in-Chief on Watch” solidarity campaign with the pro-Kurdish daily Özgür Gündem. He is the son of novelist and satirist Aziz Nesin and editor Meral Çelen.

== Early life and family ==
Nesin was born in Istanbul in 1957 to Aziz Nesin and Meral Çelen. His siblings include mathematician Ali Nesin and half-siblings Oya and Ateş from his father’s first marriage. He has been associated with the Nesin Foundation, established by his father.

== Career ==
Active since the 1980s, Nesin has written on politics, society and freedom of expression for various Turkish outlets and has published several books. Among his titles is the memoir Yaz Babam Yaz (first ed. Düşün Yayıncılık).

In politics, he sought candidacy for parliament in 1999 (ÖDP) and in 2015 (HDP), reflecting his public engagement in democratic and rights-based issues.

== Legal issues and press-freedom advocacy ==
On 20 June 2016 Nesin, together with rights advocate Şebnem Korur Fincancı and RSF’s Turkey representative Erol Önderoğlu, was arrested for acting as a one-day “guest editor” of Özgür Gündem in a campaign highlighting judicial harassment of Kurdish media. They were charged with “propaganda for a terrorist organization,” among other offenses. International organizations including Amnesty International, PEN America, the Committee to Protect Journalists (CPJ), Human Rights Watch (HRW) and Front Line Defenders condemned the detentions. Nesin was released on 1 July 2016 pending trial.

In July 2019 a court acquitted the three defendants; however, the Regional Court of Appeals overturned the acquittals in October 2020, leading to continuing proceedings documented by PEN Norway and others.

According to rights groups, Nesin left Turkey in 2016 and has since lived in self-imposed exile. In December 2024 Turkish authorities issued a detention warrant for allegedly “insulting the president” on social media, while his retrial related to the Özgür Gündem case continued.
