= Nikolai Andreev =

Russian mathematician (born 1975)

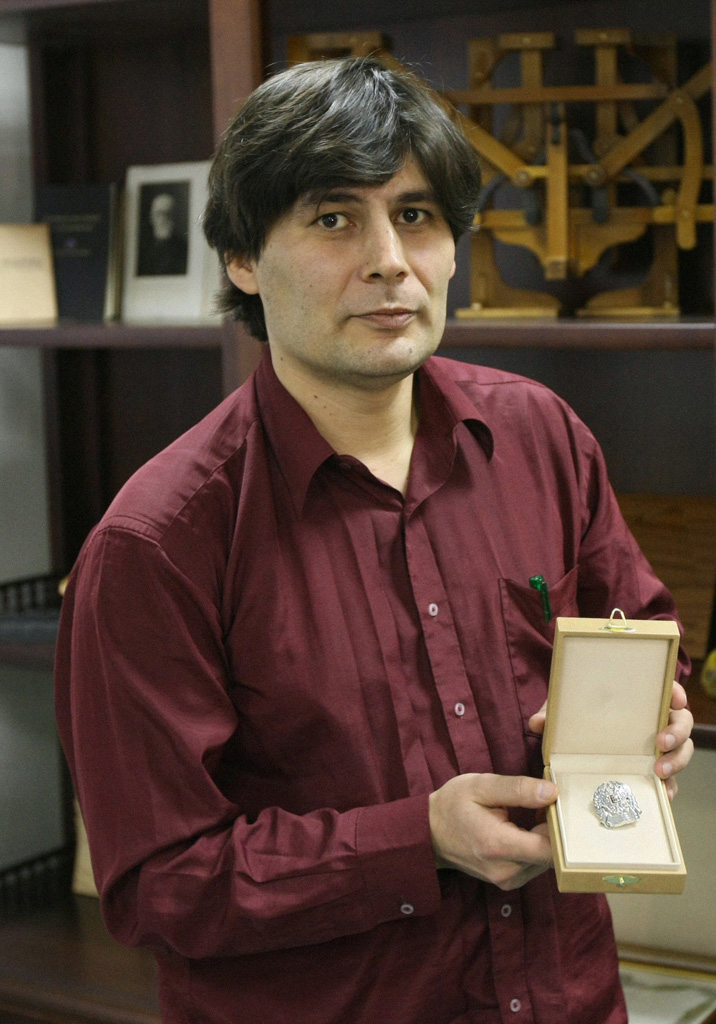
- Andreev in 2021
- Born: Nikolai Nikolayevich Andreev; 5 February 1975 (age 50); Saratov, Russia
- Years active: 1996–
- Known for: Popular mathematics. Extremal problems for polynomials

Nikolai Nikolayevich Andreev (Russian: Николай Николаевич Андреев) (born 5 February 1975 in Saratov, Russia) is a Russian mathematician and popularizer of mathematics. He was awarded with the Leelavati Award in 2022.

== Biography ==
Nikolai is the Head of the Laboratory for Popularization and Promotion of Mathematics at the Steklov Institute of Mathematics of the Russian Academy of Sciences (Moscow). He received a PhD in mathematics from Moscow State University in 2000. Among his projects is the creation of the website Mathematical Etudes.

== Awards and honours ==
- Prize of the President of the Russian Federation in the Area of Sciences and Innovations for Young Scientists (2010)
- Gold Medal of the Russian Academy of Sciences (2017) for outstanding achievements in science popularization
- The Leelavati Award in 2022 for his contribution to the art of mathematical animation and mathematical model building, in a style that inspires young and old alike, and that mathematicians around the world can adapt to its many uses, as well as for his tireless efforts to popularize genuine mathematics among the public through videos, lectures, and an award-winning book
