= Mirrors and Reflections =

Undergraduate mathematics textbook

Mirrors and Reflections: The Geometry of Finite Reflection Groups
- Author: Alexandre V. Borovik; Anna Borovik
- Language: English
- Subject: Universitext
- Publisher: Springer
- Publication date: 2009

Mirrors and Reflections: The Geometry of Finite Reflection Groups is an undergraduate-level textbook on the geometry of reflection groups. It was written by Alexandre V. Borovik and Anna Borovik and published in 2009 by Springer in their Universitext book series. The Basic Library List Committee of the Mathematical Association of America has recommended its inclusion in undergraduate mathematics libraries.

== Topics ==
Mirrors and Reflections is divided into five major parts, with two appendices. The first part provides background material in affine geometric spaces, geometric transformations,, arrangements of hyperplanes,, and polyhedral cones. The second part introduces the definitions of reflection systems and reflection groups, the special case of dihedral groups, and root systems.

Part III of the book concerns Coxeter complexes, and uses them as the basis for some group theory of reflection groups, including their length functions and parabolic subgroups. Part IV, "the highlight in this book", proves the classification of finite reflection groups and of root systems. The final part of the book studies in more detail and through more elementary methods the three-dimensional finite reflection groups and the symmetries of the regular icosahedron. Appendices provide suggestions for mathematical visualization, and list hints and solutions for exercises.

== Audience and reception ==
Mirrors and Reflections is aimed at undergraduate mathematics students, and uses an intuitive and heavily visual approach suitable for that level. its readers are expected to already have a solid background in linear algebra and some group theory. Reviewer Gizem Karaali recommends the book, both as a textbook for a "capstone" undergraduate course, and as individual reading for students interested in this topic.

== Related works ==
There are several other standard textbooks on reflection groups, including Groupes et algèbres de Lie, Chapitres 4, 5 et 6 (Bourbaki, 1968), Finite Reflection Groups (L. C. Grove and C. T. Benson, 1985), and Reflection Groups and Coxeter Groups (James E. Humphreys, 1990). However, these take a more algebraic and less geometric view of the subject than Mirrors and Reflections, and are less accessible to undergraduates.
