= Aziz Nesin =

Turkish writer, humorist and author (1915–1995)

- Born: Mehmet Nusret; 20 December 1915; Heybeliada, Istanbul, Ottoman Empire (modern Turkey)
- Died: 6 July 1995 (aged 79); Alaçatı, Çeşme, Turkey
- Occupations: Writer and humorist
- Spouses: Vedia Nesin (m. 1939–1948) Meral Çelen (m. 1956–1967)
- Children: Oya Nesin; Ali Nesin; Ateş Nesin; Ahmet Nesin

Aziz Nesin (pronounced [ˈaziz ˈne.sin]; born Mehmet Nusret,^{¶} 20 December 1915 – 6 July 1995) was a Turkish writer, humorist and the author of more than 100 books. Born in a time when Turks did not have official surnames, he had to adopt one after the Surname Law of 1934 was passed. Although his family carried the nickname "Topalosmanoğlu", after an ancestor named "Topal Osman", he chose the surname "Nesin". In Turkish, Nesin? means, What are you?.

== Pseudonyms ==
Generally going by the name "Aziz Nesin", the name "Aziz" was originally his father's nickname, used by Nesin for the pseudonym under which he started publishing. He wrote under more than fifty noms de plume, such as the pseudonym "Vedia Nesin", his first wife's name, which he used for love poems published in the magazine Yedigün.

== Biography ==
He was born in 1915 on Heybeliada, one of the Princes' Islands of Istanbul, in the days of the Ottoman Empire. After serving as a career officer for several years, he became the editor of a series of satirical periodicals with a socialist slant. He was jailed several times and placed under surveillance by the National Security Service (MAH in Turkish) for his political views throughout multiple administrations in Turkey.

In 1945, Nesin left the army. Afterwards, in 1946 Nesin launched a weekly satirical magazine, Marko Paşa, with two leading figures, namely Sabahattin Ali and Rıfat Ilgaz. He wrote a book called Azizname, which led to him being put on trial and jailed for four months although he was ultimately acquitted. While writing for his magazine, he wrote pieces that prompted Queen Elizabeth, Farouk of Egypt, and Shah Pahlavi of Iran to press criminal charges against him. As a result, he was sentenced to seven months in prison, although the complaint filed by Queen Elizabeth was dismissed because she wasn't technically the head of state. Nesin was later a contributor to Tan newspaper. He was among the contributors of the Forum magazine in the 1950s.

Nesin provided a strong indictment of the oppression and brutalization of the common man. He satirized bureaucracy and "exposed economic inequities in stories that effectively combine local color and universal truths". Aziz Nesin has been presented with numerous awards in Turkey, Italy, Bulgaria and the former Soviet Union. His works have been translated into over thirty languages. During latter parts of his life he was said to be the only Turkish author who made a living only out of his earnings from his books.

On 6 June 1956, he married a coworker from the Akbaba magazine, Meral Çelen. His son, Ali Nesin, is a prominent mathematician in Turkey.

The first time he traveled abroad was in 1965, because he was not given a passport in prior years. When he arrived in Bulgaria in 1965, he met the poet Recep Küpçü and took some of his manuscripts with him to Turkey.

In 1972, he founded the Nesin Foundation in Çatalca. The purpose of the Nesin Foundation is to take, each year, four poor and destitute children into the Foundation's home and provide every necessity - shelter, education and training, starting from elementary school - until they complete high school, a trade school, or until they acquire a vocation. Aziz Nesin donated to the Nesin Foundation his copyrights in their entirety for all his works in Turkey or other countries, including all of his published books, all plays to be staged, all copyrights for documentary, and all his works performed or used in radio or television.

Aziz Nesin was a political activist. In the aftermath of the 1980 military coup led by Kenan Evren, Turkish intelligentsia faced heavy oppression. Aziz Nesin led a number of intellectuals to rebel against the military government, by issuing the Petition of Intellectuals (Turkish: Aydınlar Dilekçesi), notable signatories of which included Yalçın Küçük, Korkut Boratav, Atıf Yılmaz and Murat Belge. For this, president Kenan Evren accused him of "treason". This prompted a lawsuit from Nesin, although the suit was unsuccessful. He was the two-time President of Türkiye Yazarlar Sendikası (Turkish Writers' Union) once from 1985 to 1986, and subsequently from 1987 to 1990.

He was also a critic of Islam. In the early 1990s, he began a translation of Salman Rushdie's controversial novel, The Satanic Verses. This provoked outrage from Islamic organizations, who were gaining popularity throughout Turkey, who then tried to hunt him down. On 11 July 1992, while attending a mostly Alevi cultural festival in the central Anatolian city of Sivas, a mob organized by Islamists gathered around the Madimak Hotel, where the festival attendants were accommodated. After hours of siege and protesting, the intruders set the hotel on fire. After flames engulfed several lower floors of the hotel, firetrucks managed to get close, and Aziz Nesin and many guests of the hotel escaped. Nesin was beaten during the chaos while firefighters rescued him. However, 37 people were killed. This event, is also known as the Sivas massacre. It also deepened the rift between fundamentalist Muslims and those that they regard as infidels.

He devoted his last years to combating religious fundamentalism. Aziz Nesin died on 6 July 1995 in Çeşme, İzmir, due to a heart attack. After his death, his body was buried at an unknown location in land belonging to the Nesin Foundation, without any ceremony, as requested in his will.

== English language bibliography ==
Several of Nesin's works have been published in English translation.

=== Istanbul Boy ===
Istanbul Boy: The Autobiography of Aziz Nesin (Turkish title: Böyle Gelmiş Böyle Gitmez) is a multi-volume autobiography by Turkish writer Aziz Nesin published by University of Texas Press and Southmoor Studios, in English language translation by Joseph S. Jacobson.

Editions

- Istanbul Boy: The Autobiography of Aziz Nesin, Part I. Austin: University of Texas Press. 1977. ISBN 0-292-73809-9.
- Istanbul Boy: The Autobiography of Aziz Nesin, Part II. Austin: University of Texas Press. 1979. ISBN 0-292-73820-X.
- Istanbul Boy: The Autobiography of Aziz Nesin, Part III. Austin: University of Texas Press. 1990. ISBN 0-292-73864-1.
- Istanbul Boy: The Autobiography of Aziz Nesin, Part IV. Utah: Southmoor Studios. 2000. ISBN 978-0-9673703-5-4.

=== Turkish Stories from Four Decades ===
Turkish Stories from Four Decades is a 1991 short story collection by Turkish writer Aziz Nesin published by Three Continents Press, in English language translation by Louis Mitler.

Editions

- Turkish Stories from Four Decades. trans. Louis Mitler. Washington D.C.: Three Continents Press. 1991. ISBN 978-0-89410-687-3.

=== Dog Tails ===
Dog Tails is a long story collection by Turkish writer Aziz Nesin republished in 2000 by Southmoor Studios, in Spanish language translation by Joseph S. Jacobson.

Editions

- Dog Tails. trans. Joseph S. Jacobson. Utah: Southmoor Studios. 2000. ISBN 978-0-9673703-4-7.

=== Memoirs Of An Exile ===
Memoirs Of An Exile (Turkish title: Bir Sürgünün Hatıraları) is an autobiographical memoir by Turkish writer Aziz Nesin about his exile to Bursa, republished in 2001 by Southmoor Studios, in English language translation by Joseph S. Jacobson.

Editions

- Memoirs Of An Exile. trans. Joseph S. Jacobson. Utah: Southmoor Studios. 2001. ISBN 978-0-9673703-8-5.

=== Hayri the Barber Surnâmé ===
Hayri the Barber Surnâmé (Turkish title: Surnâme) is a novel by Turkish writer Aziz Nesin republished in 2001 by Southmoor Studios, in English language translation by Joseph S. Jacobson.

Editions

- Hayri the Barber Surnâmé. trans. Joseph S. Jacobson. Utah: Southmoor Studios. 2001. ISBN 978-0-9673703-9-2.

=== Out of the Way! Socialism's Coming! ===
Out of the Way! Socialism's Coming! (Turkish title: Sosyalizm Geliyor Savulun!) is a 2001 selection of three stories from a short story collection by Turkish writer Aziz Nesin, published by Milet Books, in a dual of the original Turkish and an English language translation by Damian Croft, as part of its series of Turkish-English Short Story Collections.

The publisher states that, "In these hilarious and entertaining stories, the legendary Aziz Nesin turns his uniquely incisive, satirical wit on shifting ideologies, bureaucracy and the question of who’s really (in)sane: the ones locked up or the ones outside."

A review in Write Away states that, "These are thought provoking parables of our time," that, "take the mickey out of bureaucracy and political ideology and hypocrisy," and "should leave readers laughing and thinking."

The volume consists of the stories;

- Out of the Way! Socialism's Coming!
- The Inspector's Coming
- The Lunatics Break Loose

For an English-only edition of the full collection, see below under Socialism Is Coming: Stand Aside.

Editions

- Out of the Way! Socialism's Coming!. trans. Damian Croft. London: Milet Books. 2001. ISBN 978-1-84059-297-9.

=== The Dance of the Eagle and the Fish ===
The Dance of the Eagle and the Fish is a children's book adapted by English writer Alison Boyle from the short story of the same name by Turkish writer Aziz Nesin and published in 2001 by Milet Books, in English language translation by Ruth Christie.

Editions

- The Dance of the Eagle and the Fish. trans. Ruth Christie. London: Milet Books. 2001. ISBN 978-1-84059-316-7.

=== Socialism Is Coming: Stand Aside ===
Socialism Is Coming: Stand Aside (Turkish title: Sosyalizm Geliyor Savulun!) is a short story collection by Turkish writer Aziz Nesin republished in 2002 by Southmoor Studios, in English language translation by Joseph S. Jacobson.

Editions

- Socialism Is Coming: Stand Aside. trans. Joseph S. Jacobson. Utah: Southmoor Studios. 2002. ISBN 978-0-9711846-2-6.

=== The Tales of Nasrettin Hoca ===
The Tales of Nasrettin Hoca (Turkish title: Nasrettin Hoca Hikayeleri) is a short story collection by Turkish writer Aziz Nesin based on the folk tales of Nasrettin Hoca republished in 2002 by Dost Yayınları, in English language translation by Talât Sait Halman.

Editions

- The Tales of Nasrettin Hoca. trans. Talât Sait Halman. Dost Yayınları. 2002. ISBN 978-975-95481-0-0.

=== Laugh or Lament ===
Laugh or Lament: Selected Short Stories is a 2002 short story collection by Turkish writer Aziz Nesin published by Turkish Ministry of Culture, in English language translation by Masud Akhtar Shaikh, with an introduction by the translator.

The volume consists of the stories;

- A Unique Surgical Operation
- Our House and Our Landlord
- Hang These Rascals
- The Mother of Three Angels
- I Committed Suicide
- Precious Public Funds
- What a Difference
- Government Secrets Everywhere
- The Shepherd and the Lamb
- Freedom of Expression
- The Ox Tells the Truth
- Late Comers' Competition
- I am Sorry
- A Stray Dog Named Tarzan
- The Donkey and the National Service Medal
- Agent 0X-13
- Human Offspring
- Chains and Shadows
- The Cost of a Sensational Find
- Corruption Unlimited
- Beware of the Rats Among Us
- The New Prime Minister

Editions

- Laugh or Lament: Selected Short Stories. trans. Masud Akhtar Shaikh. Ankara: Turkish Ministry of Culture. 2002.
- Laugh or Lament: Selected Short Stories. trans. Masud Akhtar Shaikh. Istanbul: Nesin Books. 2006. ISBN 978-975-9038-83-0.

=== Online translations ===
- Istanbul Boy: The Autobiography of Aziz Nesin, Part I at University of Texas.
- A Patriotic Duty at Boğaziçi University.

== Notes ==
^¶ According to Nesin's autobiography Memoirs of an Exile: "They named me Nusret. In Turkish, this Arabic word means 'God's Help.' It was a name entirely fitting to us because my family, destitute of any other hope, placed all their hope in God."

== Sources ==
- Nesin, Aziz. Istanbul Boy – The autobiography of Aziz Nesin, translated by Joseph S. Jacobson
- Turkishculture.org – Aziz Nesin (1916-1995)
- Allword, Edward. The Tatars of Crimea: Return to the Homeland : Studies and Documents. North Carolina: Duke University Press, 1998. ISBN 0-8223-1994-2.
