= Adrián Paenza =

Argentine mathematician and journalist (born 1949)

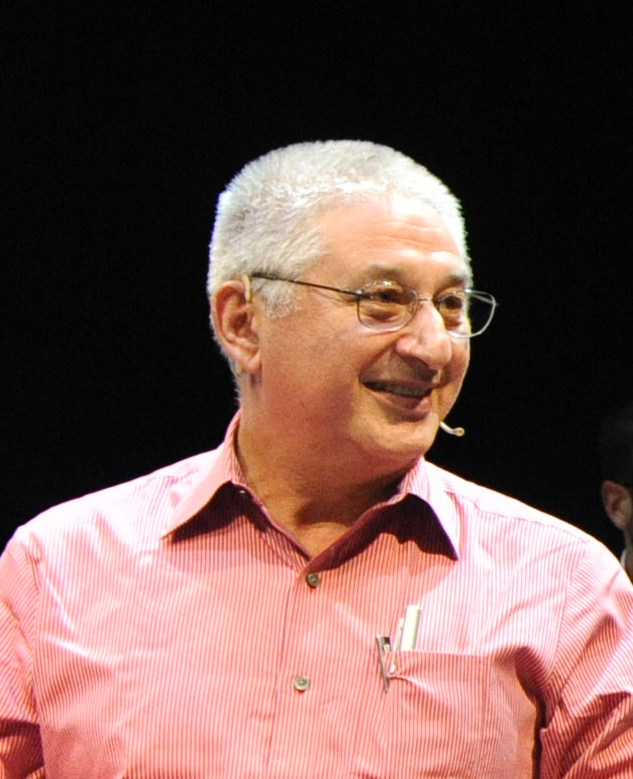
Adrián Paenza.jpg

Adrián Arnoldo Paenza (born 9 May 1949) is an Argentine journalist and PhD in mathematical sciences from the University of Buenos Aires (UBA).

He was born in Buenos Aires, Argentina in 1949 and holds a doctorate in mathematics from the University of Buenos Aires, where he currently serves as Associate Professor of the Department of Mathematics of the Faculty of Natural Sciences. He is also a journalist and worked in the major radio stations, in all five air channels in Argentina, he was a special editor of several journals, and a contributor to the three national newspapers: Clarín, Página/12 and La Nación.

His children's book series, Matemática... ¿Estás ahí?, has been a bestseller in Argentina, other Latin American countries, and also in Germany and Spain, where they have published the first two episodes. In 2014 he received the ICM Leelavati Award for his work in the dissemination of mathematics.
