= Korkut Boratav =

Turkish economist (born 1935)

- Born: 1935 (age 90–91); Konya
- Education: Law faculty of Ankara University
- Occupation: economist

Korkut Boratav (born 1935) is a Turkish Marxian economist.

== Career ==
Boratav was born in Konya. After his graduation from Ankara Gazi Highschool in 1955, he continued his studies at the Law faculty of Ankara University. In 1960 he became a lecturer and researcher at that university in Finance and Economics, by getting a postgraduate degree on Public Finances. He was granted a doctoral degree in 1964 with his thesis on “income distribution and public finance”.

He taught at Cambridge University between 1964 and 1966. In 1972 he was granted an assistant professorship at Ankara University for his thesis on "Progress of the Socialist Planned Economy". In 1975, he worked as a specialist in the Health and Welfare Department of the United Nations Organisation, in Geneva, Switzerland.

In early 1980, he became a professor at Ankara University. But after three years, he was dismissed from his position after the "1402" law put into effect by the Military coup of 1980 in Turkey. He then taught at the University of Zimbabwe in Harare from 1984 to 1986 and thereafter returned to his previous position at Ankara University.

He has retired from teaching since 2002. He was honored in 2005 by a conference about his work, organized by Ankara University and History Foundation of Turkey. He continues to publish as one of the most influential scholars of Turkish economy and economic history. Boratav is a member of the Advisory Board of Praksis, a Turkish journal of social sciences. He is the son of renowned Turkish folklorist Pertev Naili Boratav.

== Works ==
- Türkiye’de Devletçilik 1923-1950 (Statism in Turkey 1923-1950) (1962)
- Gelir Dağılımı ve Kamu Maliyesi (Income distribution and public finance) (1965)
- Uluslararası Sömürü ve Türkiye (The international exploitation and Turkey) (1979)
- Tarımsal Yapılar ve Kapitalizm (Agrarian structures and Capitalism) (1980)
- Bölüşüm Sorunları ve İktisat Politikaları (Problems of economic distribution and economy policies) (1983)
- Türk İktisat Tarihi 1908-1985 (Economic History Of Turkey 1908-1985) (1988) .
