= Ipek Duben =

Turkish artist (born 1941)

- Born: 1941 (age 84–85); Istanbul, Turkey
- Education: University of Chicago; Agnes Scott College
- Website: https://ipekduben.com

Ipek Duben (born 1941) is a contemporary visual artist based in Istanbul, Turkey. She graduated from Arnavutköy American College for Girls in 1961. After studying philosophy and art history at Agnes Scott College in the US in 1963, she completed her master's degree in political science at the University of Chicago (1965). He continued his doctoral studies in the same department until the thesis stage. In 1971, he studied drawing and anatomy with Robert Hale at the Art Students League in New York. Between 1972 and 1976, he studied at the New York Studio School of Drawing, Painting and Sculpture.

She produces artist books, poetry, installations, video, painting and sculpture. Her work deals with identity, feminism, and migration with a strong emphasis on social and political criticism. Besides actively producing and exhibiting art, Duben also has numerous published essays and books on art and criticism.

== Exhibitions ==
Staatliche Kunsthalle Baden-Baden (2022); Kunstraum Keuzberg/Bethanien (2022); Social Works, Frieze London (2018); Brighton Festival (2017); Fabrica, Brighton, UK (2017); SALT Galata, Istanbul (2015); British Museum, London (2014); 13th Istanbul Biennial (2013); Istanbul Modern (2011, 2009); the National Museum of Women in the Arts, Washington, D.C. (2010); and Akademie der Künst, Berlin (2009). In 2015, SALT published a collection of her essays on art and criticism written between 1978 and 2010.

Her book İpek Duben: The Skin, Body, and I was published in 2024.

== Education ==
Ipek Duben earned her BA at Agnes Scott College (1963), MA (1965) and ABD (1969, all but the dissertation) in Political science at the University of Chicago.

== Collections ==
Ipek Duben's works are held in the collection of the British Museum.

SALT e-publications İpek Duben Yazı ve Söyleşileri 1978-2010 [İpek Duben Essays and Interviews 1978-2010],

http://saltonline.org/tr/1432; İpek Duben [ONLAR/THEY, Video Installation],

http://saltonline.org/tr/1432, 2016
