= Leelavati Award =

International mathematics award

- Description: Outstanding contributions to public outreach in mathematics
- Sponsored by: Infosys
- Location: International (awarded at ICM)
- Presented by: International Mathematical Union (IMU)
- Rewards: ₹1,000,000 (approx. $12,000) and a citation
- Status: Active
- Website: www.mathunion.org/imu-awards/leelavati-prize

The Leelavati Award is an award for outstanding contribution to public outreach in mathematics. It is named after the 12th-century mathematical treatise "Lilavati" devoted to arithmetic, algebra, and the decimal system written by the Indian mathematician Bhāskara II, also known as Bhaskara Achārya. In the book the author posed, in verse form, a series of problems in (elementary) arithmetic to one Leelavati (perhaps his daughter) and followed them up with hints to solutions. This work appears to have been the main source of learning arithmetic and algebra in medieval India. The work was also translated into Persian and was influential in West Asia.

== History ==
The Leelavati Prize was handed out for the first time at the closing ceremony of the International Congress of Mathematicians (ICM) 2010 in Hyderabad, India. Established by the Executive Organising Committee (EOC) of the ICM with the endorsement of the IMU Executive Committee (EC), the Leelavati Prize was initiated as a one-time international award for outstanding public outreach work for mathematics. The award was so well received at the conference and in the mathematical press that the IMU decided to turn the prize into a recurring four-yearly award and the award ceremony a regular feature of every ICM closing ceremony.

The Leelavati prize is not intended to reward mathematical research but rather outreach activities in the broadest possible sense. It carries a cash prize of 1,000,000 Indian Rupees (14,000 US dollars) together with a citation, and is sponsored by Infosys since 2014.

== Laureates ==
Award year	Winner	Reasons
2010	Simon Singh	"For outstanding contributions to public outreach in mathematics by an individual."
2014	Adrián Paenza	"For his decisive contributions to changing the mind of a whole country about the way it perceives mathematics in daily life, and in particular for his books, his TV programs, and his unique gift of enthusiasm and passion in communicating the beauty and joy of mathematics."
2018	Ali Nesin	"For his outstanding contributions towards increasing public awareness of mathematics in Turkey, in particular for his tireless work in creating the "Mathematical Village" as an exceptional, peaceful place for education, research and the exploration of mathematics for anyone."
2022	Nikolai Andreev	"For his contribution to the art of mathematical animation and of mathematical model-building, in a style which inspires the young and the old alike, and which mathematicians around the world can adapt to their varied uses—as well as for his indefatigable efforts to popularize genuine mathematics among the public via videos, lectures, and a prize-winning book."
2026	Hannah Fry	"For her creative approach to communicating that mathematics is very powerful and also a lot of fun, and for her uncanny skill to attract particularly girls and young women to mathematics; through a wide range of media including books, videos, television programs, and public lectures, using outstanding creativity and originality to translate mathematics into a language of wonder and relevance for the public without diminishing its scope and importance."

== See also ==
- List of mathematics awards
