= Lorie Novak =

American artist and educator (born 1954)

- Born: 1954 (age 71–72); Los Angeles, California
- Known for: Photography, Visual Arts

Lorie Novak (born 1954) is an American artist and educator.

== Biography ==
Novak is professor of Photography and Imaging at NYU Tisch School of the Arts and Associate Faculty at the Hemispheric Institute of Performance and Politics. She is known for using different techniques to represent exploration of issues, related to memory, identity and loss, presence and absence. Novak's projects include shifting of cultural meanings of photography as well as redefining relationship between the public and intimate. Her most known work is interactive web project Collected Visions, which is running from 1996, explores how family photographs shape our memory. Novak lives and works in New York City.

Novak's works are in different permanent collections including the Art Institute of Chicago, Bibliothèque nationale de France, Fogg Art Museum, George Eastman House, Houston Museum of Fine Arts, Museum of Modern Art, San Francisco Museum of Modern Art and the Victoria and Albert Museum in London.

== Exhibitions ==
=== Solo ===
- 2011 "Encounters in the Aftermath: Works by Lorie Novak". Curated by Tess Korobkin and Audrey Sands. LeRoy Neiman Gallery, Columbia University School of the Arts. New York City, United States.
- 2001 "Lorie Novak: Photographs, 1983-2000". The Center for Creative Photography at the University of Arizona.

=== Group ===
- 2015 "Collaborative Archives: Connective Histories". Leroy Neiman Gallery. Columbia University. New York City.
- 2015 "Photography restaged". Photoville Pavilion. New York City.
