= Ali Nesin =

Turkish Mathematician

Hüseyin Ali Nesin
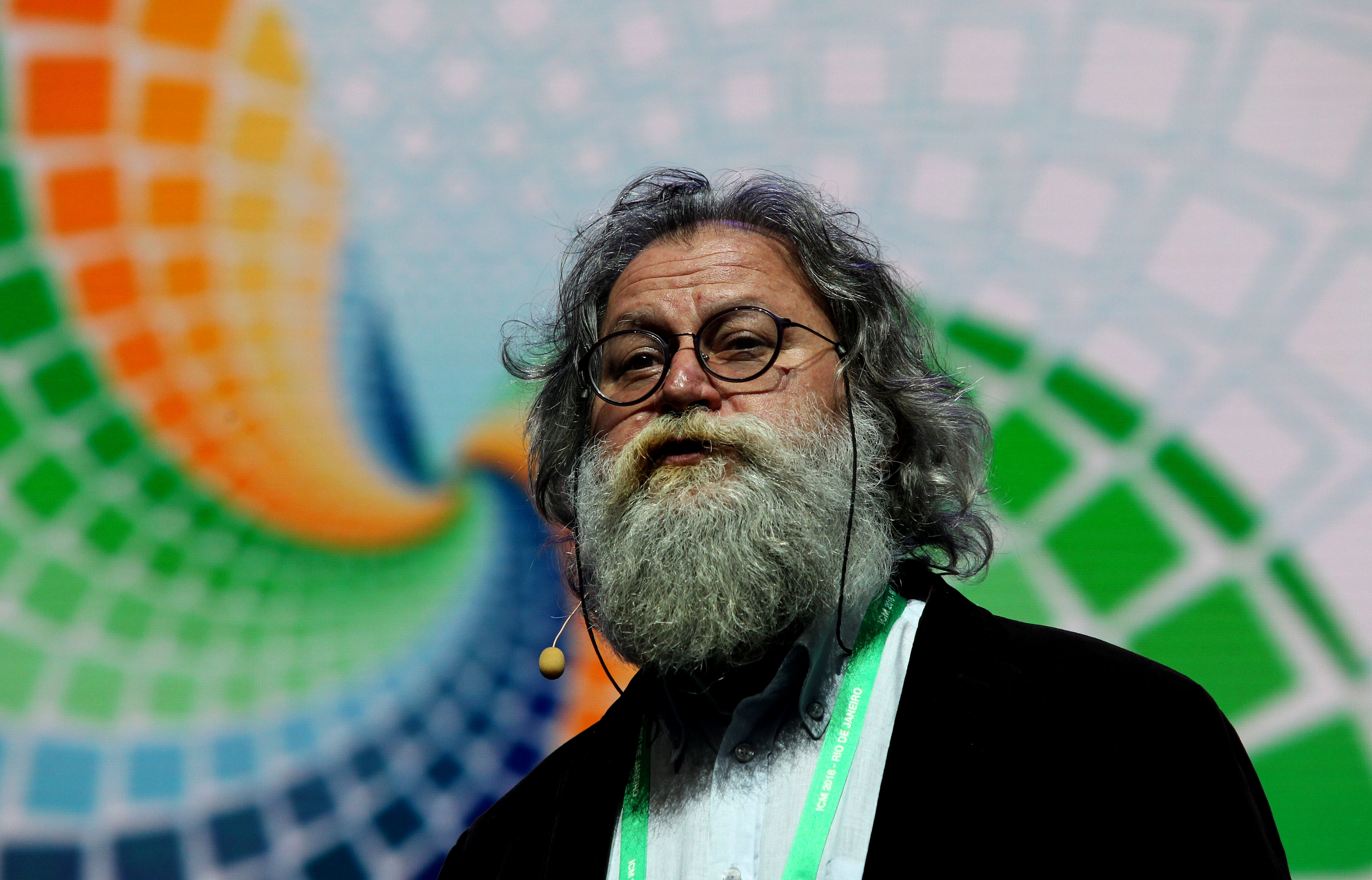
- Born: November 18, 1956 (age 69); Istanbul, Turkey
- Spouse: Beyarslan
- Children: 5
- Father: Aziz Nesin
- Awards: Leelavati Award
- Website: alinesin.org

Hüseyin Ali Nesin (born 18 November 1956, Istanbul) is a Turkish mathematician and professor, specialized in algebra and mathematical logic. He founded the Nesin Mathematics Village in 2007.

He is the son of famous writer Aziz Nesin, and his mother is Meral Çelen.

== Biography ==
Primary school he went to middle school in Lycée Saint-Joseph, Istanbul and high school in Collège Champittet. In the years 1977-1981 he got a Maîtrise ès arts degree from Paris Diderot University in maths. Later on, he got his doctorate in mathematical logic and algebra in Yale University. He worked in University of California, Berkeley as a teacher during the years 1985-1986. During the time he was in Turkey for military service, which is mandatory for every male in Turkey. He was arrested and tried for "inciting the army to rebellion" because he objected to the vaccination of recruits from the same syringe. He was acquitted at the end of the trial.

He was an assistant professor at the University of Notre Dame from 1987 to 1989, then associate professor and later professor at the University of California Irvine Campus until 1995. He spent the 1993-1994 academic year at Bilkent University as a visiting lecturer. Upon the death of his father, Aziz Nesin, in 1995, he returned to his home country for good and became the leader of the Nesin Foundation.

He was the Head of the Department of Mathematics at Istanbul Bilgi University from 1996 to 2022. As of 2022, he became the Head of the Department of Mathematics at İstinye University. Ali Nesin has four children. He has been the general director of Nesin Publishing House since November 2004 and has been a member of the advisory board of the Hrant Dink Foundation since 2011.

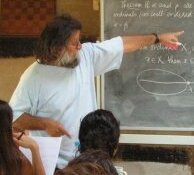
Ali Nesin, giving a lecture in Nesin Mathematics Village.

Ali Nesin's popular math books Mathematics and Fear, Mathematics and Nature, Mathematics and Infinity, Mathematics and Games, Mathematics and Camels and Donkeys, Monster of Mathematics and Mathematics and Truth, as well as semi-academic mathematics books such as Propositional Logic, Counting and Naive Set Theory, and There are Analysis books consisting of four volumes. In addition to these, he has scientific articles published in various journals, an English book he wrote with Alexandre Borovik (Groups of Finite Morley Rank), and translations from the Ottoman manuscripts of his father Aziz Nesin.

Ali Nesin's correspondence with his father Aziz Nesin (like his other books) was published in two volumes by Nesin Publishing House. His mathematical research area is "Groups of finite Morley rank". He is also the responsible editor of the journal named Matematik Dünyasi, which has been published quarterly since 2003 and owned by the Turkish Mathematical Society. In addition, he has lecture notes on set theory and analysis accepted by the Turkish Academy of Sciences.

In addition to mathematics research department chair and Nesin Foundation, he also works on oil painting, drawing and portraiture. He is a founding member of the Turkish Human Rights Institution Foundation. He is the founder of Nesin Mathematics Village and a member of the Academy of Sciences.

Nesin was awarded the four-yearly Leelavati Award by the International Congress of Mathematicians in August 2018.

== Political Views ==
Ali Nesin voted yes to the 2010 Turkish constitutional referendum, in support of the Justice and Development Party (AKP) supporting the "Not Enough But Yes" campaign. Nesin said in 2017, "If it was today, I would still say 'Not enough, but yes'".

== His personal life ==
He is married to Özlem Beyarslan and has four children.
