= Alexandre Borovik =

British mathematician

Alexandre V. Borovik (born 1956) is a Professor of Pure Mathematics at the University of Manchester, United Kingdom. He was born in Russia and graduated from Novosibirsk State University in 1978. His principal research lies in algebra, model theory, and combinatorics—topics on which he published several monographs and a number of papers. He also has an interest in mathematical practice: his book Mathematics under the Microscope: Notes on Cognitive Aspects of Mathematical Practice examines a mathematician's outlook on psychophysiological and cognitive issues in mathematics.

== Selected books and articles ==
- Borovik, Alexandre; Borovik, Anna (2010), Mirrors and reflections : the geometry of finite reflection groups, New York: Springer, ISBN 9780387790664
- Borovik, Alexandre; Jin, Renling; Katz, Mikhail G. (2012), "An Integer Construction of Infinitesimals: Toward a Theory of Eudoxus Hyperreals", Notre Dame Journal of Formal Logic, 53 (4): 557–570, arXiv:1210.7475, doi:10.1215/00294527-1722755, S2CID 14850847.
- Borovik, Alexandre; Nesin, Ali: Groups of finite Morley rank. Oxford Logic Guides, 26. Oxford Science Publications. The Clarendon Press, Oxford University Press, New York, 1994
- Borovik, Alexandre V.; Gelfand, I. M.; White, Neil: Coxeter matroids. Progress in Mathematics, 216. Birkhäuser Boston, Inc., Boston, MA, 2003.
- Borovik, Alexandre; Katz, Mikhail G. (2011), "Who gave you the Cauchy–Weierstrass tale? The dual history of rigorous calculus", Foundations of Science, 17 (3): 245–276, arXiv:1108.2885, doi:10.1007/s10699-011-9235-x, S2CID 119320059.
