= Krist Gruijthuijsen =

Dutch curator and art critic

Krist Gruijthuijsen (born 1980 in the Netherlands) is a Dutch curator and art critic who was serving as Director of KW Institute for Contemporary Art in Berlin, Germany, until 2023. At KW, he curated exhibitions with, among others, Hanne Lippard, Ian Wilson, Adam Pendleton, Ronald Jones, Hiwa K, Willem de Rooij, Beatriz González, David Wojnarowicz, Hreinn Friðfinnsson, and Hassan Sharif.

== Career ==
Gruijthuijsen was artistic director of the Grazer Kunstverein in Graz (2012–2016) and Course Director of the MA Fine Arts Department at the Sandberg Instituut in Amsterdam (2011–2016). He is one of the co-founding directors of Kunstverein in Amsterdam.

Gruijthuijsen has organized numerous exhibitions and projects over the past decade, including Manifesta 7 (Trentino-South Tyrol, Italy), Platform Garanti Contemporary Art Center (Istanbul, Turkey), Artists Space (New York, USA), Museum of Contemporary Art (Belgrade, Serbia), Swiss Institute (New York, USA), Galeria Vermelho (São Paulo, Brazil), Stedelijk Museum (Amsterdam, the Netherlands), Van Abbemuseum (Eindhoven, the Netherlands), Arnolfini (Bristol, Great Britain), Project Arts Centre (Dublin, Ireland), Utah Museum of Contemporary Art (Salt Lake City, USA), and Institute of Modern Art (Brisbane, Australia).

In 2022, Gruijthuijsen co-curated (along with the former gallerist Kirsten Landwehr) the art installed at the Château Royal hotel in Berlin, including works by John Bock, Thomas Demand and Alicja Kwade.

On 19 November 2026, the Stedelijk Museum Amsterdam announced that Gruijthuijsen would succeed Rein Wolfs as artistic director on 10 July 2027.

== Other activities ==
In 2018, Gruijthuijsen was a member of the selection committee which put forward Moritz Wesseler as director of Fridericianum. That same year, he served on the jury that selected Sondra Perry for the Nam June Paik Award.

In 2023, Gruijthuijsen served as curatorial advisor of Artissima art fair, alongside Jacopo Crivelli Visconti.

== Publications ==
Gruijthuijsen has produced, edited and published in numerous collaborations with JRP|Ringier Kunstverlag, Sternberg Press, Mousse Publishing Printed Matter, Verlag der Buchhandlung Walther König and Kunstverein Publishing. Recent publications are amongst others Mierle Laderman Ukeles – Seven Work Ballets (Sternberg Press, 2015), Vincent Fecteau (Sternberg Press, 2015), Writings and Conversations by Doug Ashford (Mousse Publishing, 2014), Lisa Oppenheim: Works 2003–2013 (Sternberg Press, 2014), The Encyclopedia of Fictional Artists and the Addition(JRP|Ringier, 2010), and several others under the umbrella of Kunstverein Publishing.
