= Mboup =

Mboup is a surname. Notable people with the surname include:

- Nzinga Biegueng Mboup, Senegalese architect
- Pathé Mboup (born 2003), Senegalese footballer
- Souleymane Mboup (born 1951), Senegalese microbiologist
