= List of Goethe-Institut locations =

This list gives a geographical overview of all the worldwide locations of the Goethe-Institut. The list also includes Goethe Centres, which are overseas German cultural institutions that have official cooperation agreements with the Goethe-Institut and offer some of the services of the Goethe-Institut, e.g. language classes and certification.

== Africa ==
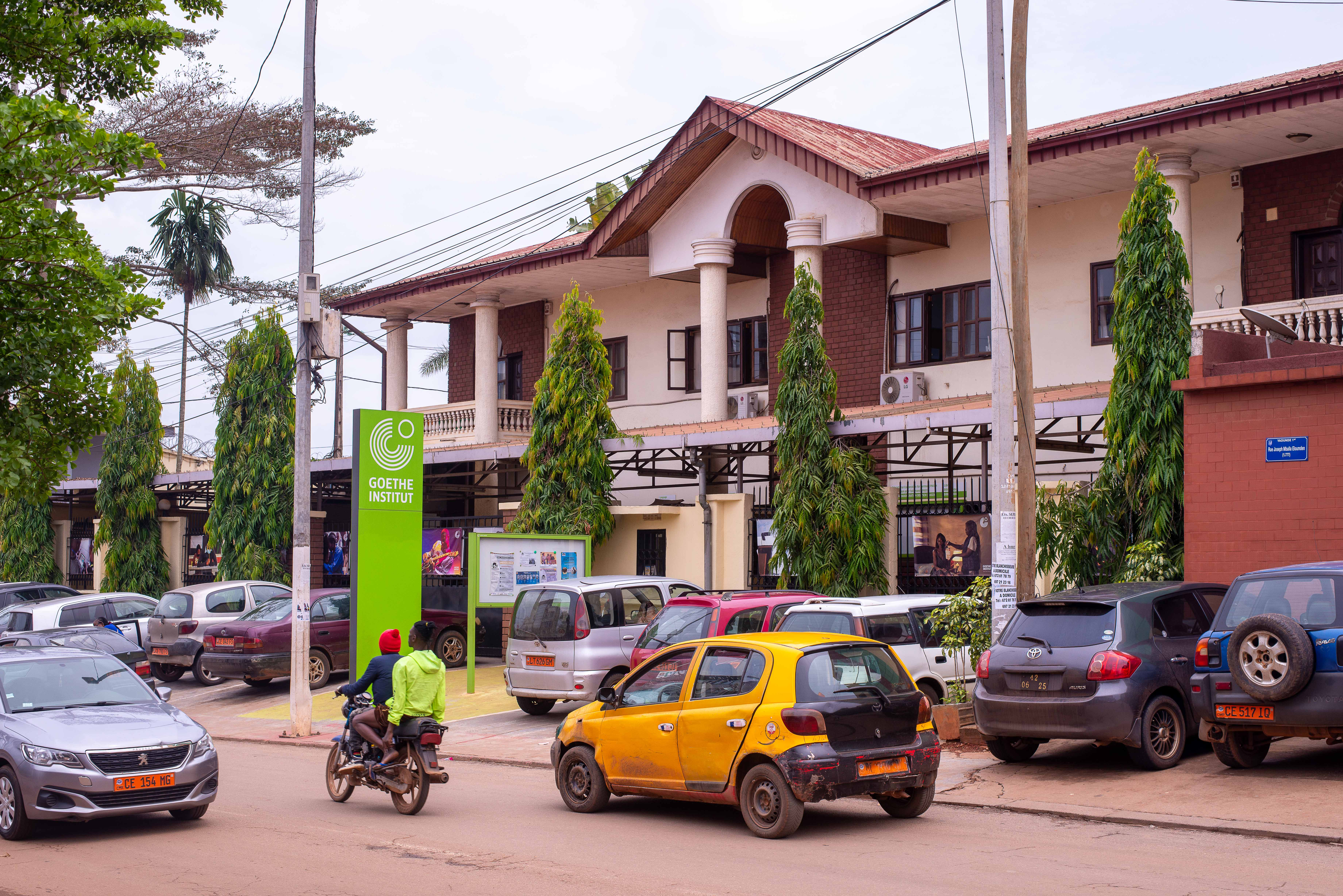
The Goethe-Institut of Yaoundé, Cameroon, in 2018.

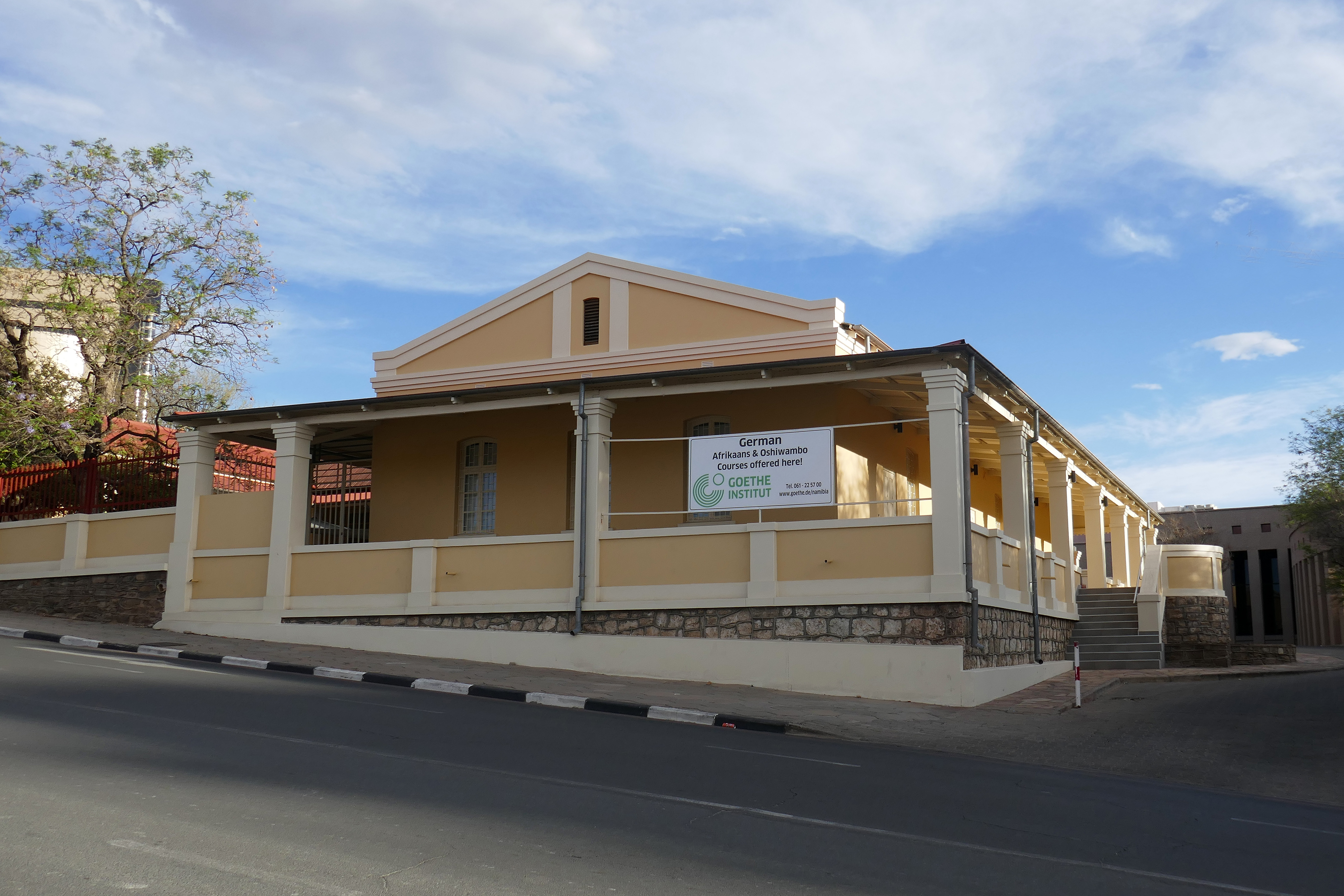
The Goethe-Institut in Windhoek, Namibia.

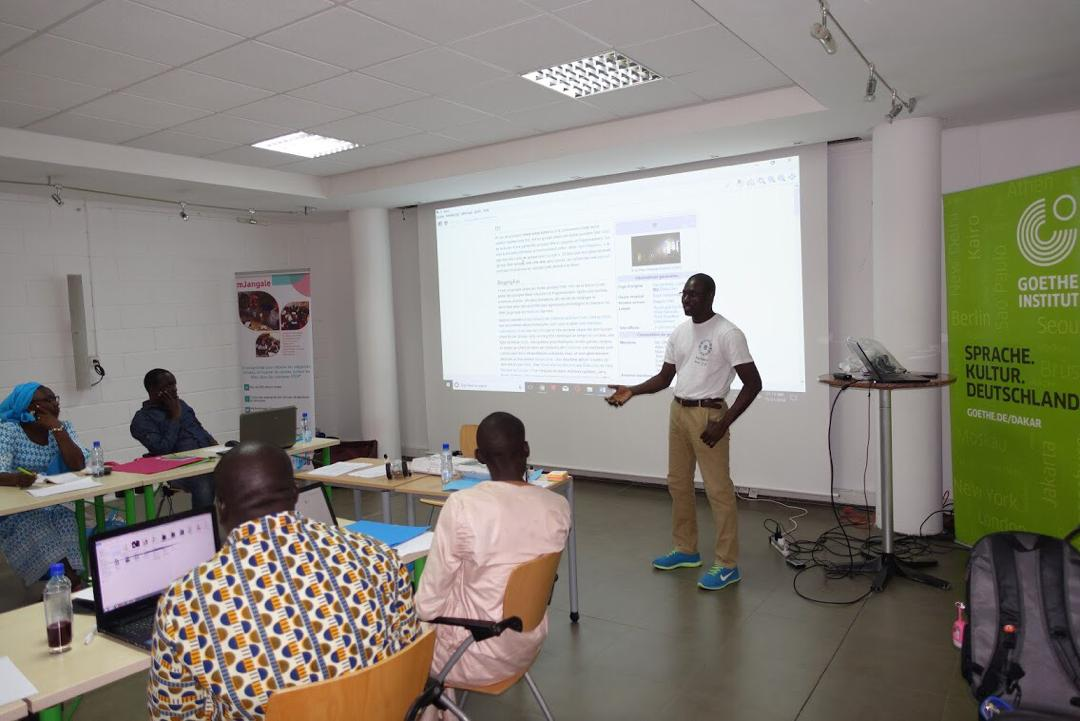
During a training session at the Goethe-Institut in Dakar, Senegal.

Country	City
Algeria	Algiers
Angola	Luanda
Cameroon	Yaoundé
Côte d'Ivoire	Abidjan
Burkina Faso	Ouagadougou
Egypt	Alexandria, Cairo
Ethiopia	Addis Ababa
Ghana	Accra
Kenya	Nairobi
Libya	Tripoli
Madagascar	Antananarivo
Morocco	Casablanca, Rabat
Mozambique	Maputo
Namibia	Windhoek
Nigeria	Lagos
Ruanda	Kigali
Senegal	Dakar
South Africa	Johannesburg, Cape Town
Sudan	Khartoum, closed in 2023
Tanzania	Dar es Salaam
Togo	Lomé
Tunisia	Tunis
Uganda	Kampala
Zimbabwe	Harare

== North America ==
Country	City
Canada	Montreal, Ottawa, Toronto
Mexico	Guadalajara, Mexico City
United States	Atlanta, Boston, Chicago, Los Angeles, New York (Goethe House), San Francisco, Washington, D.C., St. Louis

== South America ==
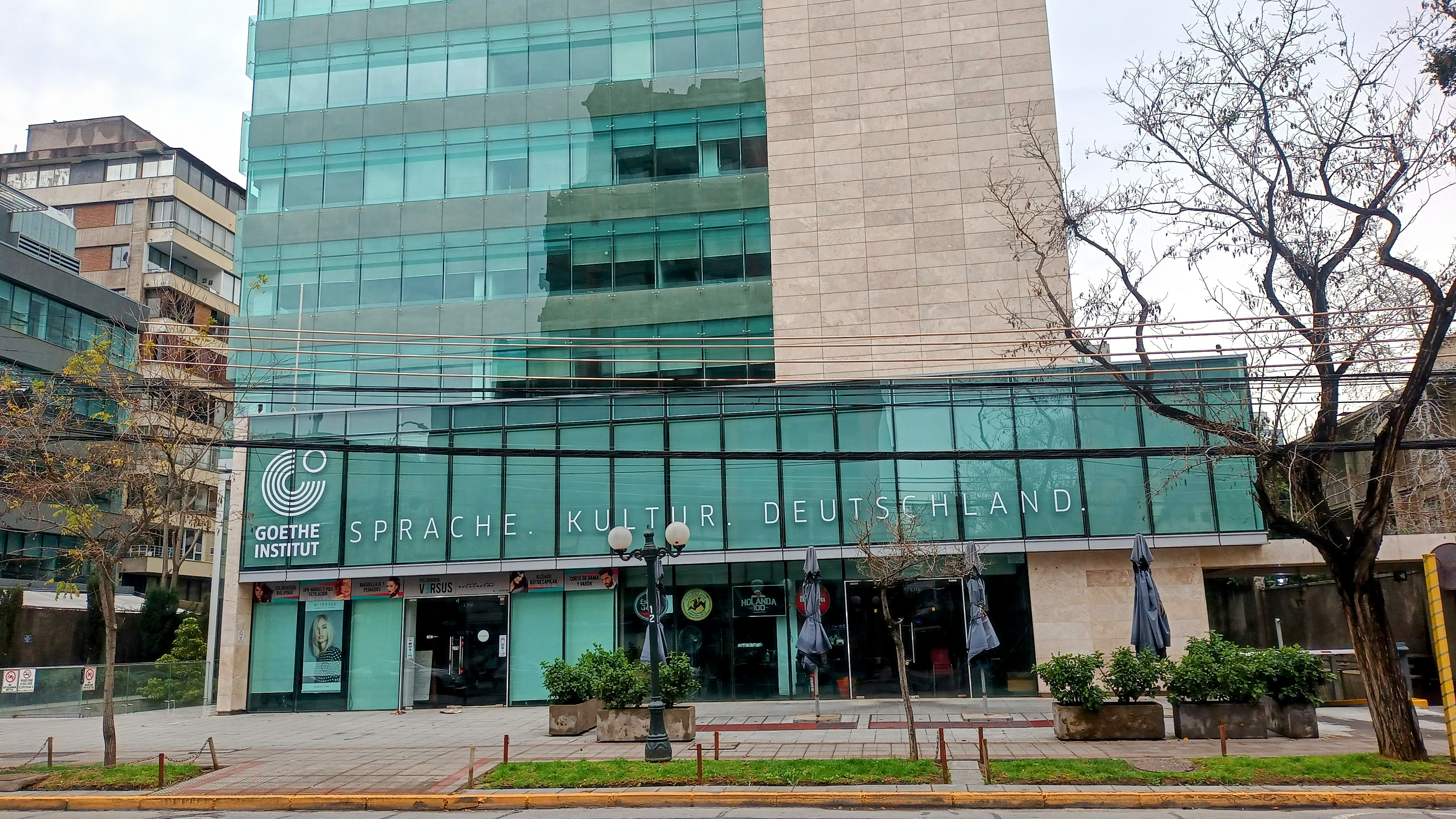
The Goether-Institut in Providencia, Chile.

Country	City
Argentina	Buenos Aires, Córdoba, Mendoza, San Juan
Bolivia	La Paz, Santa Cruz de la Sierra
Brazil	Brasília, Curitiba, Porto Alegre, Rio de Janeiro, Salvador, São Paulo
Chile	Concepción, Santiago de Chile
Colombia	Bogotá
Costa Rica	San José
Cuba	Havana
Ecuador	Quito
Paraguay	Asunción
Peru	Arequipa, Cusco, Lima
Uruguay	Montevideo
Venezuela	Caracas

== Asia ==
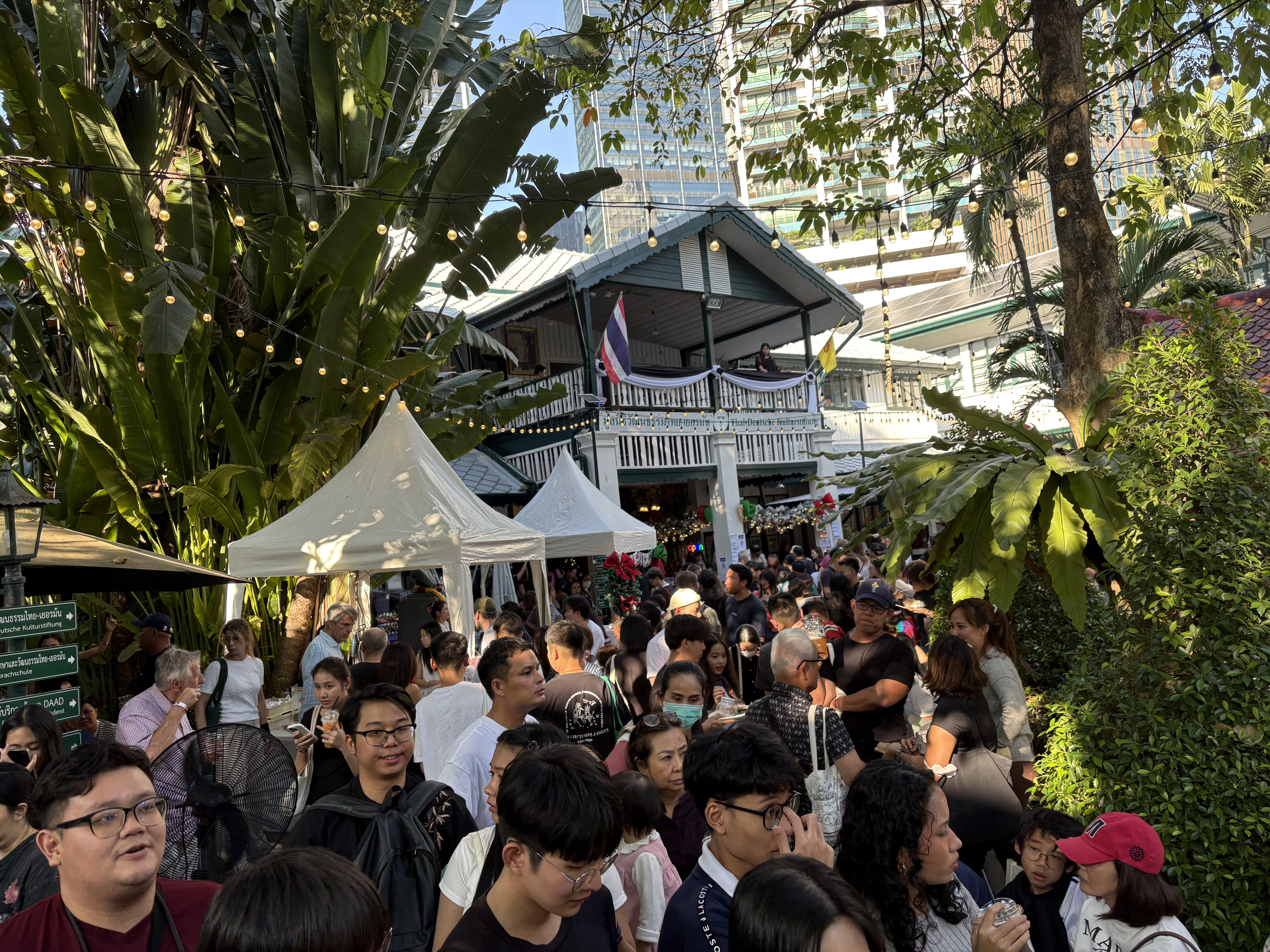
The German Christmas market organised at the Goethe-Institut in Bangkok in 2025.

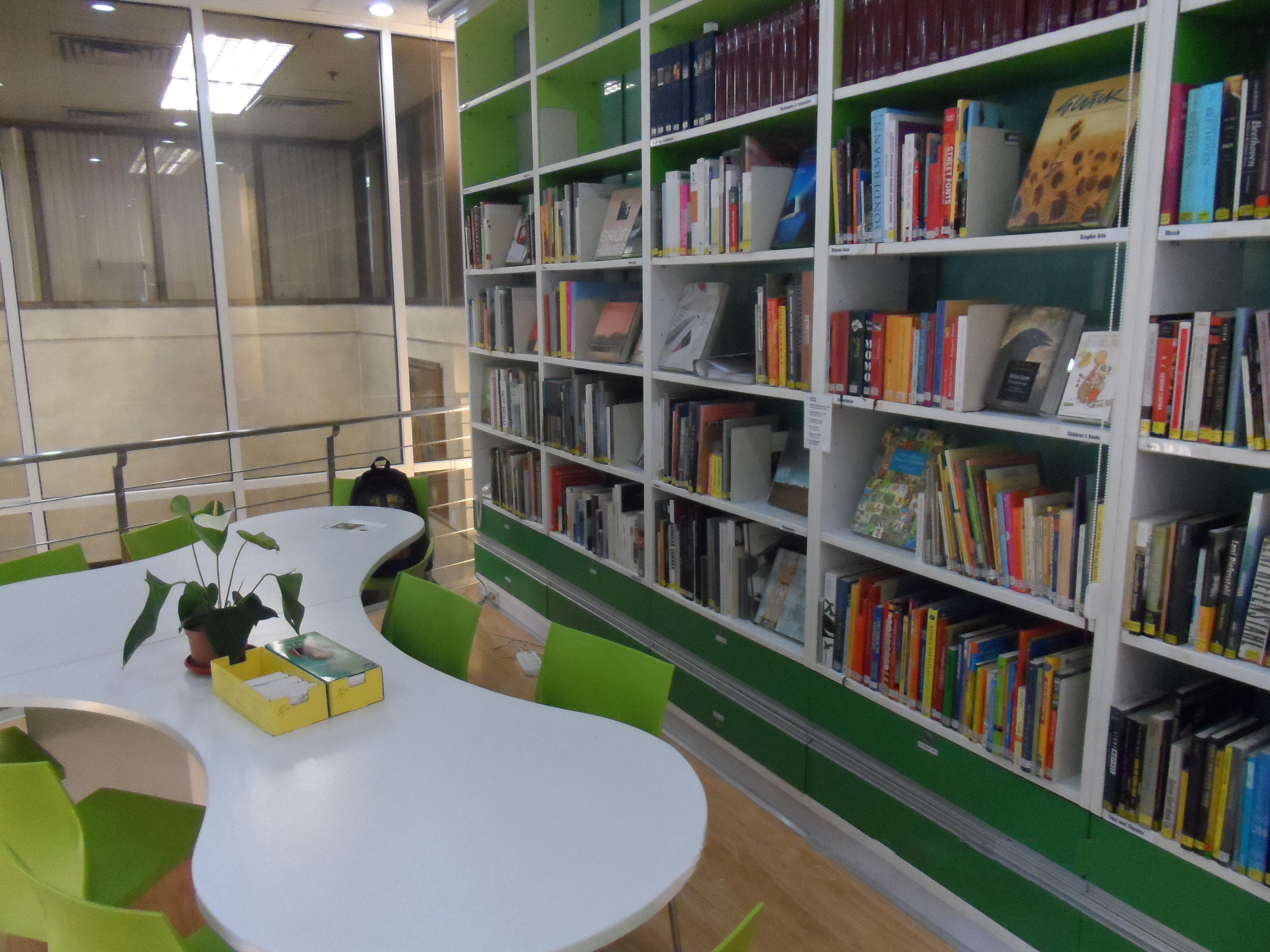
Inside the library of the Goethe-Institut of Makati City in the Philippines.

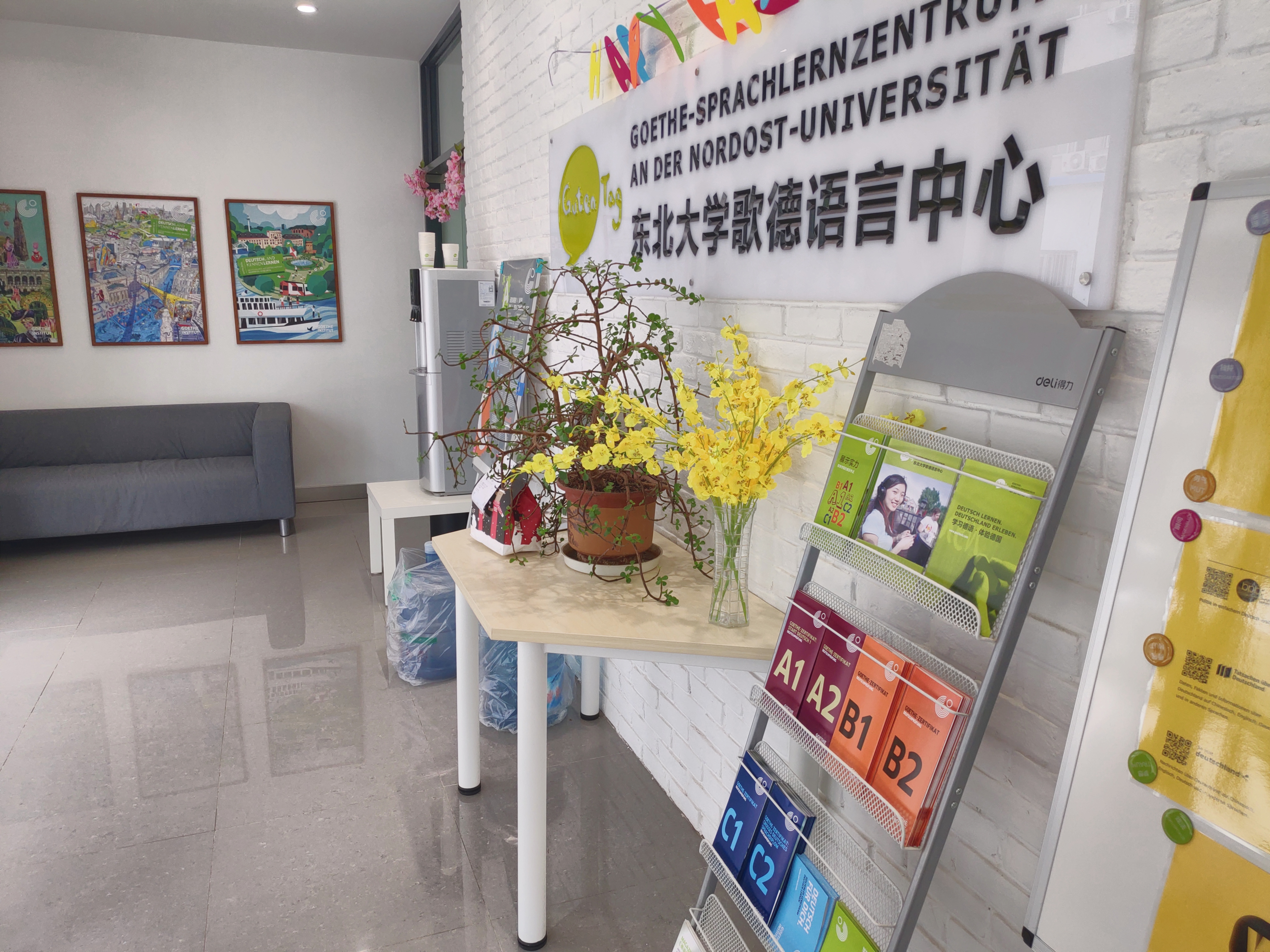
The Goethe Language Learning Centre in Shenyang, China.

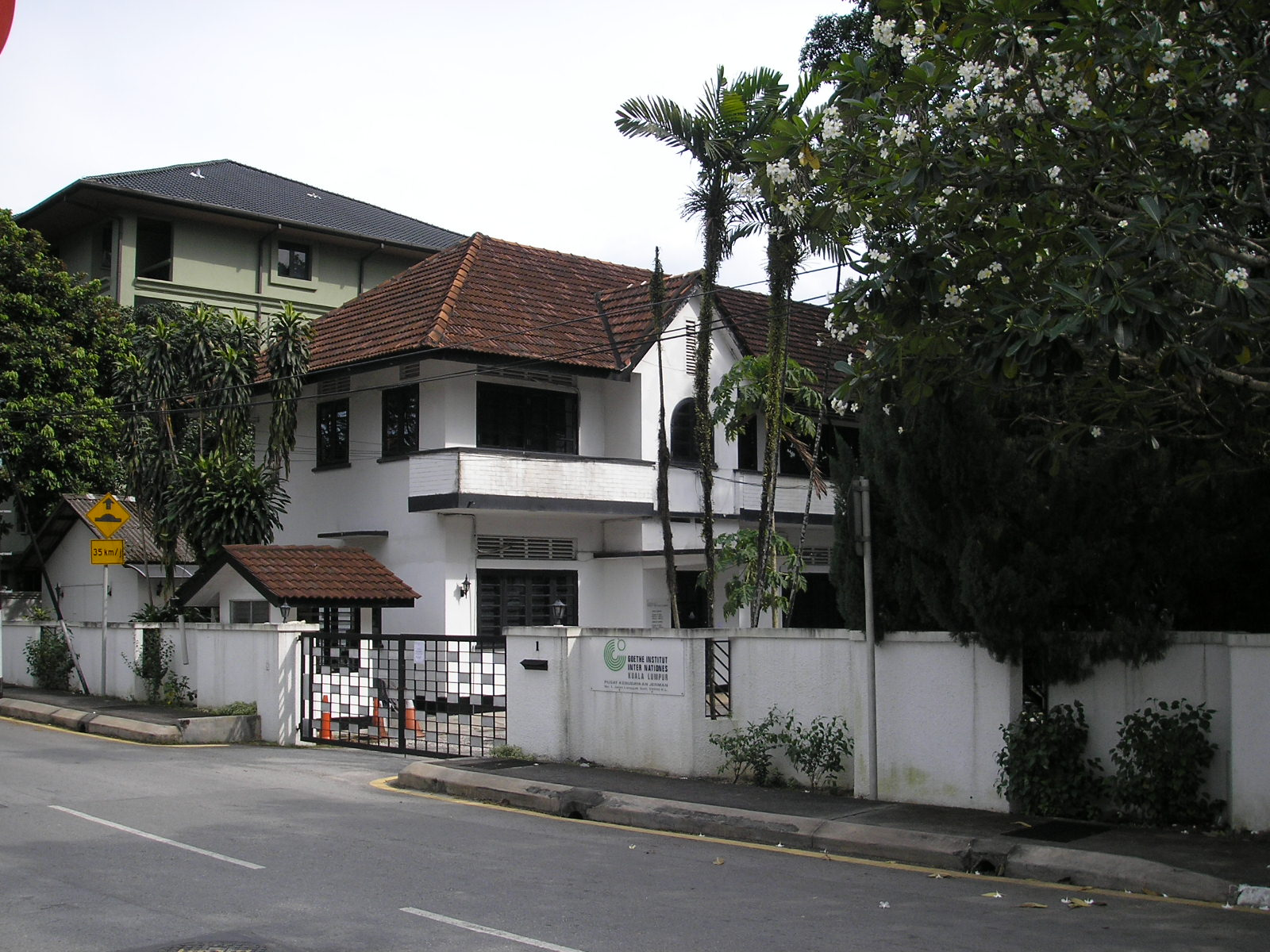
The Goethe-Institut of Kuala Lumpur.

Country	City
Armenia	Yerevan
Azerbaijan	Baku
Bangladesh	Dhaka
Cambodia	Phnom Penh
China	Beijing, Shanghai(described as "representatives of Goethe-Institut") (Language learning centers: Shenyang, Tianjin, Qingdao, Xi'an, Nanjing, Shanghai, Wuhan, Chongqing, Guangzhou)
Cyprus	Nicosia
Georgia	Tbilisi
Hong Kong	Hong Kong
India	Ahmedabad, Bangalore, Chandigarh, Chennai (Madras), Coimbatore, Hyderabad, Kolkata (Calcutta), Mumbai (Bombay), New Delhi, Pune (Poona), Thiruvananthapuram
Indonesia	Jakarta, Bandung, Surabaya
Iran	Teheran (Deutsches Sprachinstitut Teheran)
Iraq	Erbil
Israel	Jerusalem, Tel Aviv
Japan	Kyoto, Osaka, Tokyo
Jordan	Amman
Kazakhstan	Almaty
Lebanon	Beirut
Malaysia	Kuala Lumpur
Mongolia	Ulaanbaatar
Myanmar	Yangon
Oman	Muscat (branch office of Goethe-Institut Abu Dhabi)
Nepal	Kathmandu
Pakistan	Karachi, Lahore
Palestinian National Authority	Ramallah
Philippines	Manila
Singapore	Singapore
South Korea	Seoul, branch offices in Busan, Daejeon, Daegu, Gwangju
Sri Lanka	Colombo
Syria	Damascus, closed since 2012
Taiwan	Taipei
Thailand	Bangkok
Turkey	Ankara, Istanbul, İzmir
United Arab Emirates	Abu Dhabi, Dubai (branch office of Goethe-Institut Abu Dhabi)
Uzbekistan	Tashkent
Vietnam	Hanoi, Ho Chi Minh City

== Europe ==
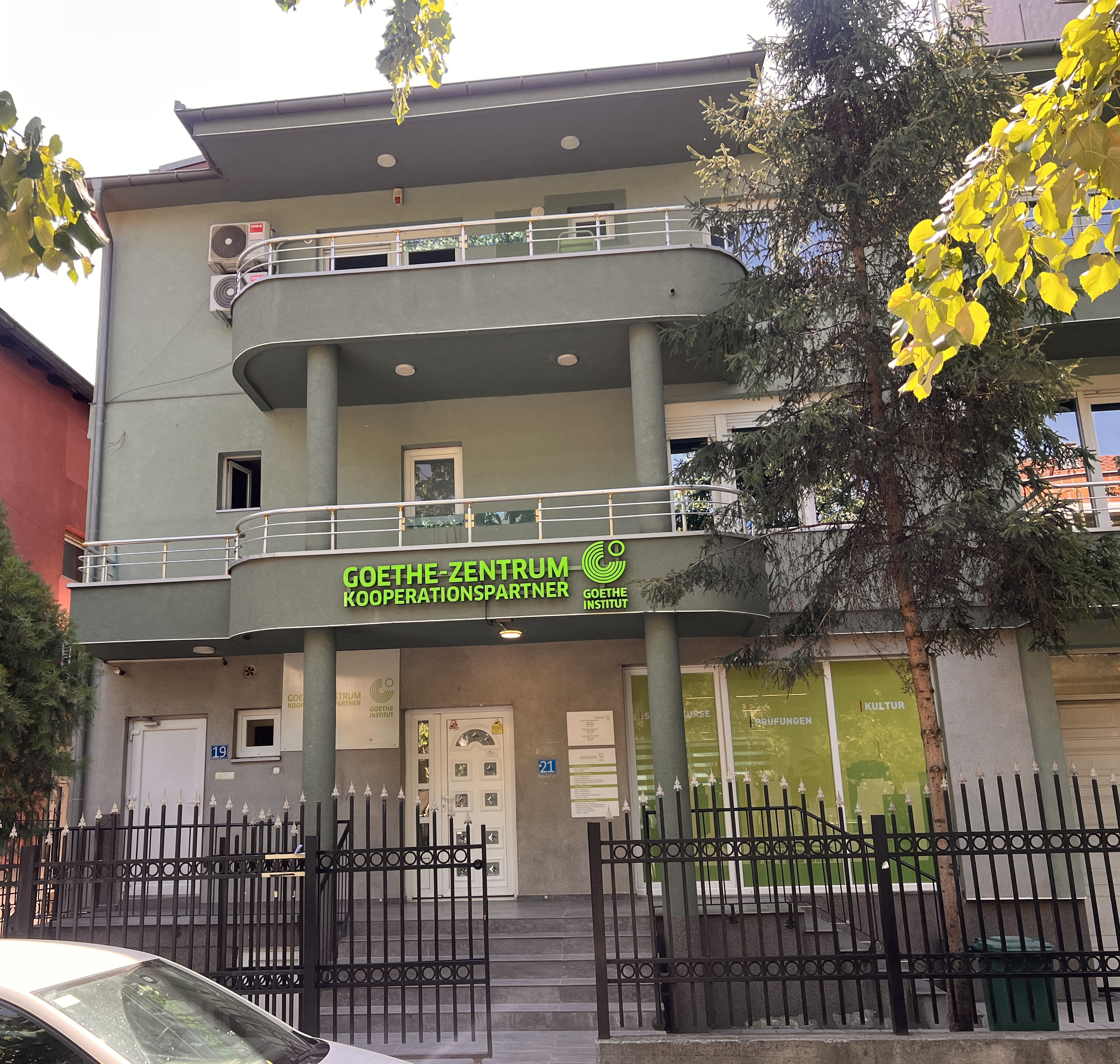
The Goethe-Zentrum in Pristina, Kosovo.

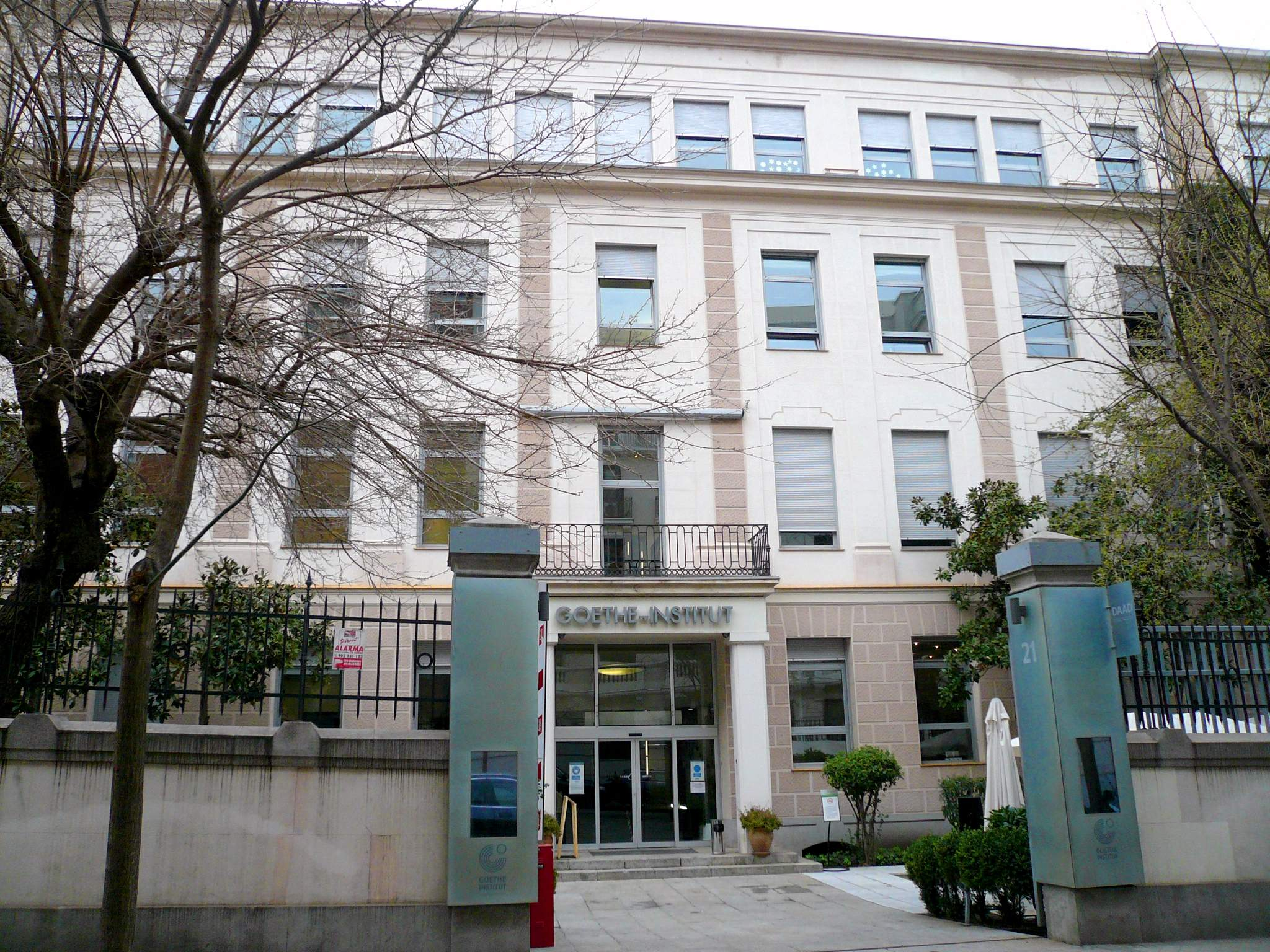
The Goethe-Institut of Madrid, Spain.

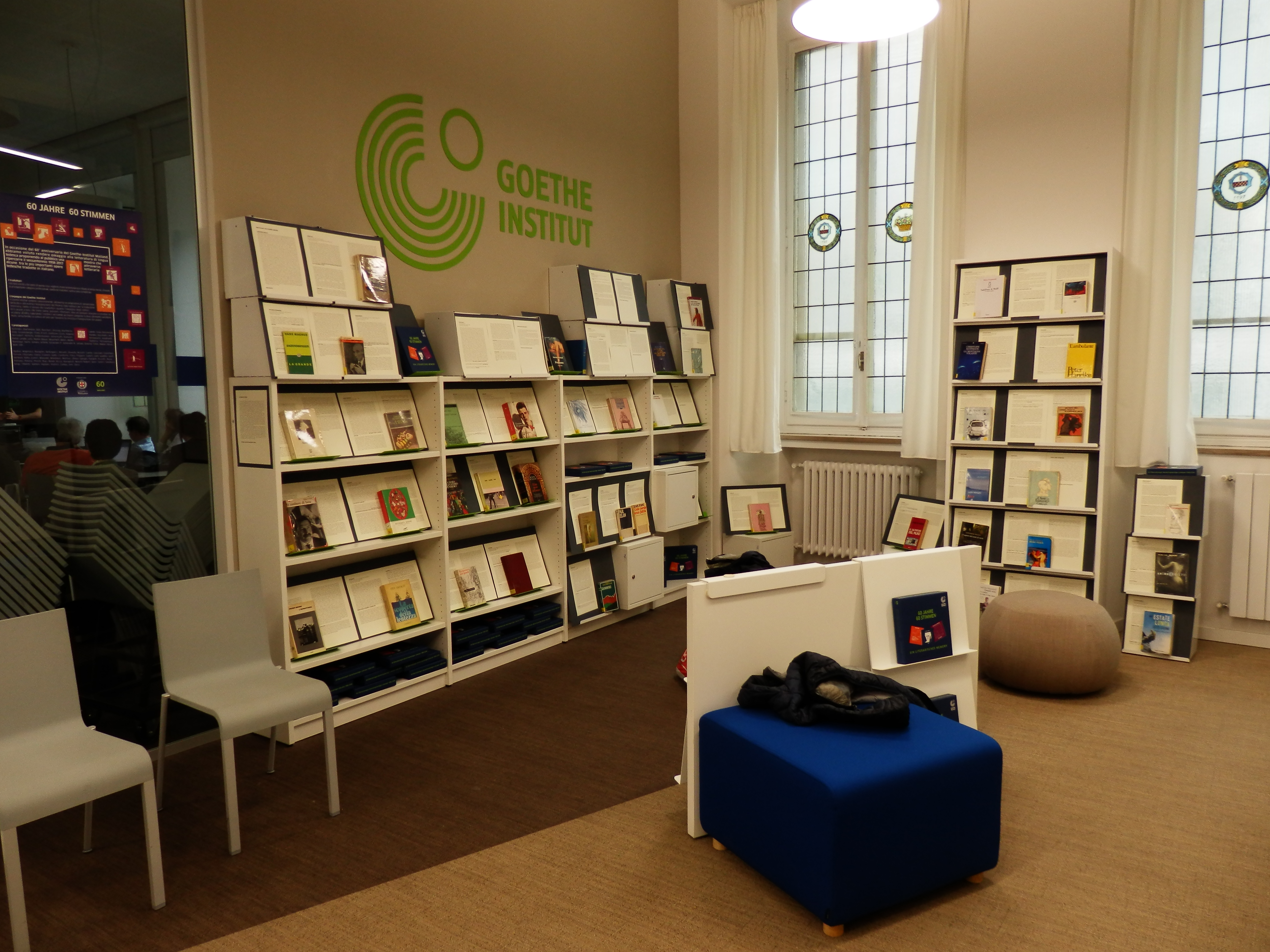
Inside the Goethe-Institut of Milan, Italy.

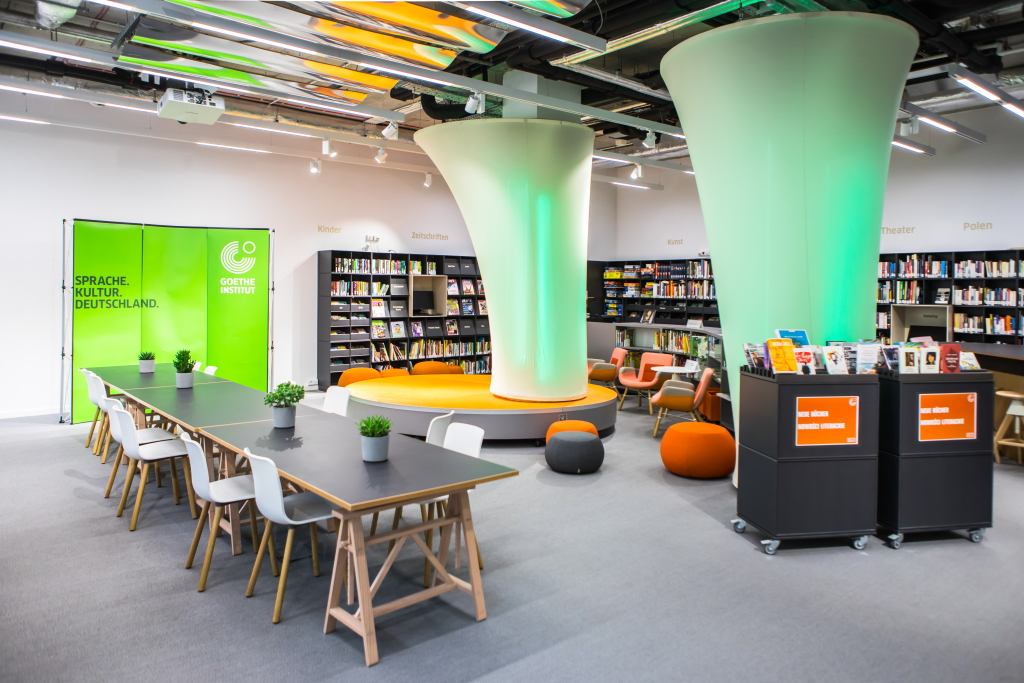
The library of the Goethe-Institut in Warsaw, Poland.

Country	City
Albania	Tirana
Austria	Vienna
Belarus	Minsk
Belgium	Brussels
Bosnia and Herzegovina	Sarajevo
Bulgaria	Sofia
Croatia	Zagreb
Czech Republic	Pardubice, Prague
Denmark	Copenhagen
Estonia	Tallinn, Tartu
Finland	Helsinki
France	Bordeaux, Lille, Lyon, Nancy, Paris, Strasbourg, Toulouse
Germany	Berlin, Berlin (capital office), Bonn, Bremen, Dresden, Düsseldorf, Frankfurt, Freiburg, Göttingen, Hamburg, Heidelberg, Mannheim, Munich, Munich (head office), Schwäbisch Hall, Weimar
Greece	Athens, Chania, Patras, Thessaloniki
Hungary	Budapest
Ireland	Dublin
Italy	Bologna, Genoa, Milan, Naples, Palermo, Rome, Trieste, Turin, Verona
Kosovo	Pristina
Latvia	Riga
Lithuania	Vilnius
Luxembourg	Luxembourg (Institut Pierre Werner)
Netherlands	Amsterdam, Rotterdam
North Macedonia	Skopje
Norway	Oslo
Poland	Kraków, Warsaw, [Lublin]
Portugal	Lisbon, Porto
Romania	Bucharest
Russia	Moscow, Saint Petersburg, Yekaterinburg, closed since 2026
Serbia	Belgrade
Slovakia	Bratislava
Slovenia	Ljubljana
Spain	Barcelona, Madrid
Sweden	Stockholm
Ukraine	Kyiv
United Kingdom	Glasgow, London

== Oceania ==
Country	City
Australia	Melbourne, Sydney
New Zealand	Wellington
