= Goethe-Institut, New York =

- Headquarters: 30 Irving Place, New York, NY 10003; United States
- Website: www.goethe.de/newyork

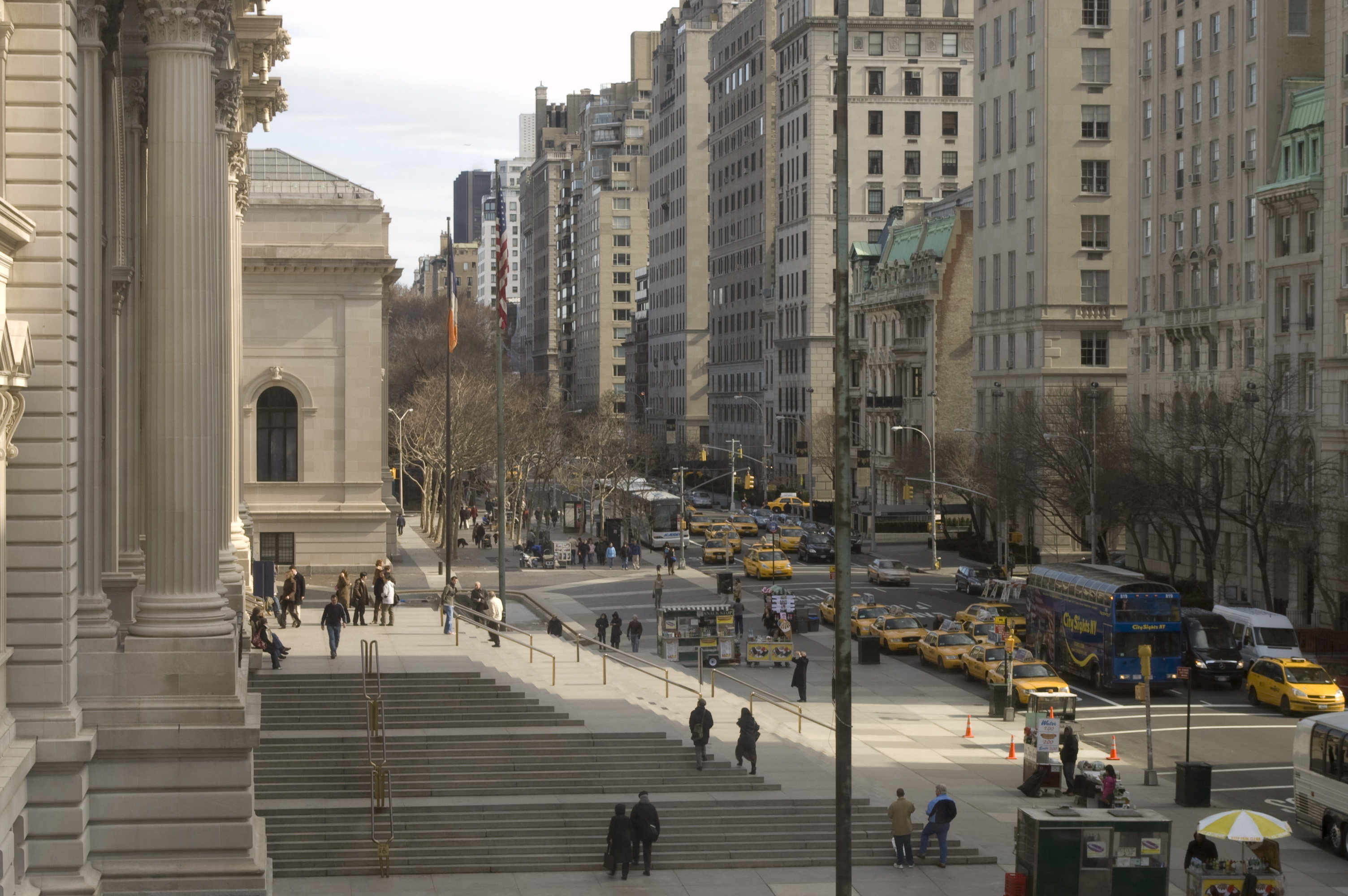
Goethe-Institut, New York (former location)

The Goethe-Institut New York is an organization that is located at 30 Irving Place in Manhattan, New York City. The organization is part of the worldwide Goethe-Institut non-profit association. It fosters cultural cooperation and promotes German language learning by offering the public opportunities to interact with themes and questions relevant to German culture and society. The institute provides grants for translation in subject areas like democracy, current regional and global issues, the cultural dimension of European integration, recent German history or outstanding works of contemporary German literature.

== History ==
=== 120 East 56th Street ===
The Goethe-Institut New York origins were with the Goethe-Haus (New York), an organization founded for the purpose of furthering cultural relations between the people of Germany and the people of the United States, The Goethe House was founded April 12, 1957, as an American non-profit membership corporation in New York City.

The institute has its beginning in the Goethe Etage, an office building at 120 East 56th Street between Park and Lexington Avenues, to provide enough space for its books, small exhibitions, and lectures.

The inaugural address was given by James B. Conant, former President of Harvard University, John J. McCloy's successor as High Commissioner in Germany, and from 1955–57 America's first Ambassador to the Federal Republic of Germany. John J. McCloy, Chairman of Chase Manhattan Bank, had presented the plan for the establishment of such a cultural center to Chancellor of Germany Konrad Adenauer three years earlier.

James B. Conant became President of Goethe House, John J. McCloy became Chairman of the Board of Trustees. Under the stewardship of McCloy and his former political adviser in Germany Samuel Reber, who becomes Goethe House's first administrator, the cultural center served as a forum for German representatives in art and culture.

=== 1014 Fifth Avenue ===
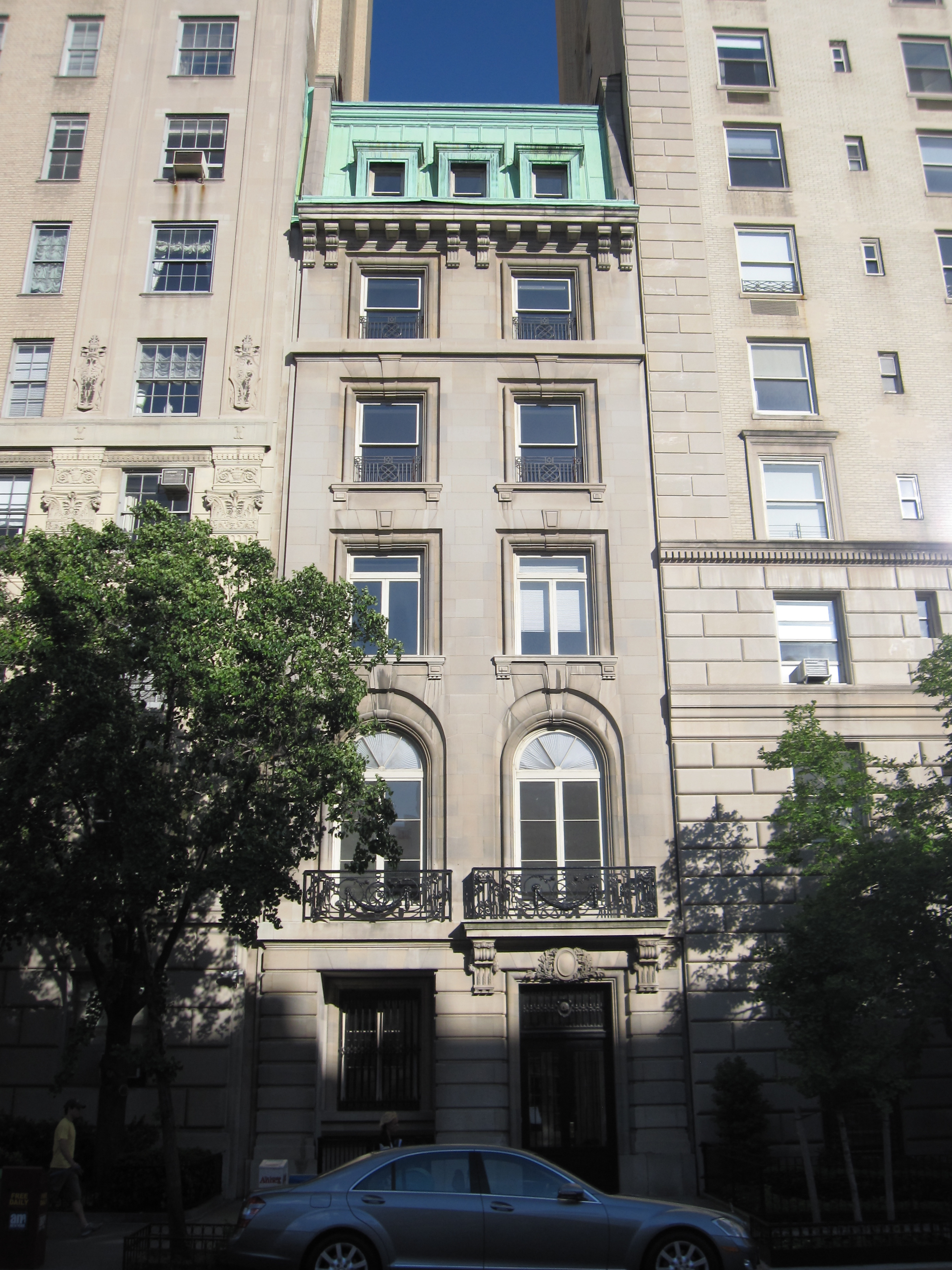
1014 5th Avenue

The German government gives Goethe House a new home at 1014 Fifth Avenue. Acquired from the estate of James W. Gerard, pre-World War I American Ambassador to Imperial Germany, the mansion becomes the home of Goethe House for over fifty years.

In 1969 the Goethe House, while retaining its original name, became a branch of the Munich-based Goethe-Institut and since then received financial support from the Federal Republic of Germany.

Following an international design competition in 2021, the German government appointed David Chipperfield Architects to convert the building into a new centre for transatlantic dialogue, at a cost of around 20 million euros.

=== 38 Ludlow Street ===
Designed by artists Ethan Breckenridge and Liam Gillick, Goethe-Institut Curatorial Residencies Ludlow 38 was founded as a space in 2008 for experiments within contemporary art. The venue is located on the Lower East Side in the tradition of the German Kunstverein. Ludlow 38 was initially programmed by a different German Kunstverein each year: Kunstverein München in 2008, followed by the European Kunsthalle and Künstlerhaus Stuttgart.

=== 72 Spring Street ===
On April 15, 2010, the Goethe-Institut New York announced the relocation of its library and administrative offices to 72 Spring Street. Located in the East Village off Bowery, the Wyoming Building became a space for talks, performances, film screenings, installations, and exhibitions.

=== 30 Irving Place ===
New spaces on the first and fourth floors of 30 Irving Place opened in March 2015 to the public with space for lectures and film screenings, a library, reading rooms, language classrooms, and offices.

== North American region ==
The Goethe-Institut New York is also regional coordinator of 10 institutes and one center in the North American region, which comprises Canada, the United States, and Mexico, and committed to the same set of goals and objectives. In the United States: Boston, New York, Washington, D.C., Chicago, San Francisco, and Los Angeles, and the Goethe-Zentrum in Atlanta. In Canada: Ottawa, Montreal, and Toronto. In Mexico: Mexico City. Cuba also belongs to the North American region and work leading to the establishment of a Goethe-Institut in Havana is currently underway.

== Goethe-Institut New York Library ==
The Goethe-Institut New York Library is a lending library that has a collection of approximately 8,000 volumes. The collection features four areas of specialization: contemporary German art, contemporary and classic German literature, German film and German history from the late 19th century to the present.

== Exhibitions (selected) ==
- 1968: Max Beckmann, Die Druckgrafik (Library)
- 1973: Rainer Werner Fassbinder, Retrospective
- 1985: Wols, Drawings and Watercolors
- 1992: Rirkrit Tiravanija, Consumed
- 1999: Nam June Paik, Buddha Watching TV, 1974/97
- 2004: Candida Höfer: Traces / Spuren
- 2016–17: Elias Wessel, Stuck Together Pieces!
