= Nzinga Biegueng Mboup =

Senegalese female architect

- Born: Senegal
- Occupation: Architect

Nzinga Biegueng Mboup is a Senegalese architect based in Dakar, known for her expertise in bioclimatic design and construction utilizing locally sourced earth and biomaterials. She is also recognized for her significant contributions to architectural research, particularly in the study of Dakar's urban and cultural heritage.

== Early life and education ==
After completing her architectural studies at the University of Pretoria in South Africa, Nzinga Biegueng Mboup gained professional experience in Johannesburg for a period of two years. Subsequently, she pursued a Master's degree in Architecture at the University of Westminster in London. Following her academic pursuits, she joined the architectural firm Adjaye Associates, where she predominantly worked on the IFC headquarters project in Dakar.

== Career ==
In 2019, Nzinga Biegueng Mboup co-founded the architectural practice Worofila, which specializes in bioclimatic design and construction techniques that prioritize the use of locally sourced earth and biomaterials. Under her guidance, Worofila successfully executed several projects using earth construction methods, including the Sendou home, the Ngor house, and the Goethe-Institut, in collaboration with Kéré Architecture.

== Research ==
Nzinga Biegueng Mboup has been a researcher affiliated with the African Futures Institute since 2022. She has co-authored two research projects that have garnered recognition and interest within the academic and architectural community.

The first research project, titled Dakarmorphose, was initiated in 2017 in collaboration with Carole Diop. This ongoing project aims to explore the evolution of Lebu villages and the urban and cultural heritage of the city of Dakar. Notably, the findings from Dakarmorphose were exhibited at the Dakar Art Biennale in both 2018 and 2022, and the research has contributed to various scholarly papers and conferences.

The second research endeavor, known as Habiter Dakar, began in 2019 in partnership with Caroline Geffriaud and the Goethe-Institut Dakar. Habiter Dakar is dedicated to examining the evolution and challenges related to housing in Dakar, shedding light on critical issues and potential solutions for the city's residential development.

== Completed Projects ==
=== Residential ===
- Keur Guilaye, Keur Guilaye, 2022
- Villa N, Ndangane, 2022
- Keru Mbuubenne, Sendou, 2021
- Project NKD, Dakar, 2021

=== Public Facilities ===
- Ecopavillion, Diamniadio, 2019
- Regional Train Stations, Dakar-AIBD, 2019

== Exhibitions ==
- Aesthetics & Logics, Versailles, 2022
- Reclaiming the Wolof Compound with Local Materials, London, 2021

== Awards ==
- Ashden Awards for Cooling in Informal Settlements, shortlisted

== Selected publications ==
- "The Future of Mud, A Senegalese architecture firm is championing a lower-tech material than concrete to help cities prepare for climate change," July 2022
