= Kunstmuseum =

Kunstmuseum is a German or Dutch word literally translated into English as "art museum". It may refer to:

- KUNSTEN Museum of Modern Art Aalborg, art museum in Aalborg, Denmark
- Kunstmuseum Basel, the largest art museum in Basel, Switzerland
- Kunstmuseum Bayreuth, art museum in Bayreuth, Germany
- Kunstmuseum Bern, art museum in Bern, Switzerland
- Kunstmuseum Bonn, modern art museum in Bonn, Germany
- Kunstmuseum Den Haag, art museum in the Hague, the Netherlands
- Kunstmuseum Düsseldorf, original name (until 2001) of the Museum Kunstpalast in Düsseldorf, Germany
- Kunstmuseum Liechtenstein, the national art museum of Liechtenstein
- Kunstmuseum St. Gallen, art museum in St. Gallen, Switzerland
- Kunstmuseum Solothurn, art museum in Solothurn, Switzerland
- Kunstmuseum Stuttgart, contemporary art museum in Stuttgart, Germany
- Kunstmuseum Winterthur, art museum in Winterthur, Switzerland
- Kunstmuseum Wolfsburg, art museum in Wolfsburg, Germany

See also:

- Kunsthalle
