= Goethe-Institut Dhaka =

- Founded: 1961
- Founder: Goethe-Institut
- Type: Cultural institution
- Location: House 10, Road 9, Dhanmondi R/A, Dhaka-1205, Bangladesh
- Region served: Bangladesh
- Product: Promote knowledge of the German language abroad and foster international culture.
- Key people: Frank Werner, Institute Director Dr. Fabian Falter, Head of Language Department/ Deputy Director
- Website: https://www.goethe.de/dhaka

The Goethe-Institut Dhaka is a nonprofit German cultural organization situated in Dhaka, Bangladesh. The institute fosters knowledge about Germany by providing information on German culture, society and politics. This includes the exchange of films, music, theatre, and literature. Goethe cultural societies, reading rooms, and exam and language centers have played a role in the cultural and educational policies of Germany for more than 60 years.

In Bangladesh, the Goethe-Institut first opened at Gladstone House, 80 Motijheel Commercial area in Dhaka in 1961. In 1967, the institute was relocated to House 23, Road 2, Dhanmondi. The present premises of the institute is at House 10, Road 9, Dhanmondi.

The Goethe-Institut is the Federal Republic of Germany's cultural institution operational worldwide. The institute promotes the study of German abroad and encourage international cultural exchange. They also aim to foster knowledge about Germany by providing information on its culture, society and politics.

== Activities ==
- Language courses/Sprachkurse
- Library/Bibliothek
- Cultural program/Veranstaltungen
- DAAD Information Centre/DAAD-Informationszentrum
- PASCH (school project)
- Newsletter

== See also ==
- List of Goethe-Institut locations
