= Elias Wessel =

German artist (born 1978)

- Born: 1978 (age 47–48); Bonn, West Germany
- Occupation: Artist
- Website: https://www.eliaswessel.com/

Elias Wessel (born 1978) is a visual artist living and working in New York and Germany.

== Early life ==
Wessel was born in Bonn, West Germany in 1978.

== Education ==
- 1999–2000 University of Heidelberg; Art History
- 2000–2003 University of Mannheim – Faculty for Art and Design; Visual Communication
- 2003–2007 University of Art and Design, Offenbach am Main; Fine Art Photography, Theory of Perception, History and Theory of Visual Communication

== About ==
Elias Wessel is committed to developing photographic concepts and procedures which culminate in abstract images that reflect contemporary discourses within society. The works function as both a contribution to the issues of social and political development and the historical conversation between photography and painting.

== Solo exhibitions (selected) ==
- It’s Complicated. Picture Theory, New York, August 2–September 7, 2024.
- Elias Wessel: Delirious Images – Fotografien für die nächste Gesellschaft. Kunstsammlung im Willy-Brandt-Haus, Berlin, March 4–May 7, 2023.
- Elias Wessel—It’s Complicated, Is Possibly Art. 1014, New York, September 7–23, 2022.
- Elias Wessel – I Don’t Care. I Love my Phone. Kunstsammlung SAP, Walldorf, January 28, 2021 – April 30, 2022.
- Elias Wessel : La somme de mes données. Palais Beauharnais, Paris, January 28–December 28, 2020.
- Elias Wessel: Die Summe meiner Daten – Digitalisierung, Überwachung, Identität [The Sum of My Data. Digitization, Surveillance, Identity]. Kunstverein Speyer, December 2, 2018 – January 13, 2019.
- Werke aus »Die Summe meiner Daten« [Selected Works From ›The Sum of My Data‹]. Internationale Photoszene-Festival Köln, Kunstraum Ruttkowski, Cologne, September 1–30, 2018.
- In The End, Though, Nothing Is Lost. Deutsches Haus at New York University, NYU Arts & Science, New York, April 6–May 26, 2018.
- Sprung in die Zeit [Leap into Time]. No Cube – Raum für Kunst und Medien, Münster, February 18–March 25, 2018.
- Elias Wessel: Die Summe meiner Daten [The Sum of My Data] – B/W Series. Baustelle Schaustelle, Essen, January 12–February 25, 2018.
- Elias Wessel: History of Touches. Consulate General of the Federal Republic of Germany, New York, November 10–December 15, 2017.
- Die Geschichte vom Vergessenen [The Story of The Forgotten]. Heinrich-Hoffmann Museum, Frankfurt am Main, February 24–July 19, 2017.
- Sprung in die Zeit – Zum Wesen der Bilder [Leap into Time – On the Essence of Images]. Raum für Kunst und Gegenwart, Ansbach, December 19, 2016 – February 26, 2017.
- Elias Wessel: Stuck Together Pieces! 1014, New York, November 2, 2016 – May 31, 2017.
- Spuren der Wirklichkeit [Traces of Reality]. Goethe-Institut, Frankfurt am Main, August 5–October 5, 2016.
- Landscapes. Künstlerbund Speyer, April 17–26, 2015.
- Elias Wessel: There Must Be More To Life. Art Directors Club, New York, September 2012.

== Group exhibitions (selected) ==
- Liminal Spaces. International House, New York, May 1–31, 2025
- Transformationen. Museum Pfalzgalerie Kaiserslautern, June 5–August 11, 2024
- Would You Share Your Gold Medal? School of Visual Arts, New York, November 1–8, 2023
- Pulsar. Photoszene Festival, Beiste_Satellite, Cologne, May 12–21, 2023
- zu mir und zu dir. Franz Jyrch, Maria Sainz Rueda, Elias Wessel; Former Synagogue Walldorf, June 25–July 24, 2022.
- Das Objekt im Fokus [Eyes on the Object.] Karl Blossfeldt, Alfred Ehrhardt, Walker Evans, Candida Höfer, Günther Selichar, Josef Sudek, Michael Wesely, Elias Wessel, Edward Weston, Erwin Wurm and others; SpallArt Collection, Salzburg, August 1, 2020 – May 7, 2022.
- Objects. Stories. Experiences: Extraordinary Things. Assembly Required, Brooklyn, NY, October 2–30, 2021.
- Ich bin ganz von Glas – Marianne Brandt und die gläserne Kunst von heute [I Am All of Glass – Marianne Brandt & the Art of Glass Today.] Sächsisches Industriemuseum Chemnitz, September 28–December 1, 2019.
- Works from the AXA Art Collection – Adolf Luther, Günther Uecker, Elias Wessel. Art Basel, Basel, March 29–31, 2018.
- Photo – BauSchau Projekte 2007–2018. Düsseldorf Photo 2018 at Baustelle Schaustelle, Düsseldorf, February 16–25, 2018.
- Grieger Relaunch. Thomas Demand, Andreas Gursky, Axel Hütte, Thomas Ruff, Thomas Struth, Damien Hirst, Elias Wessel and others; NRW Forum Düsseldorf, November 28–December 4, 2017.
- Doll Parts. Leslie Lohman Museum, New York, May 18, 2017.
- Wiesinger, Stünkel, Wessel: Sichtbarkeiten [Visibilities.] Museum Heylshof and Museum Andreasstift, Worms, August 2–September 27, 2015.
- Freistil – Ein transatlantischer Blick [Freestyle. A Transatlantic Perspective.] Kunstverein Speyer, May 10–June 7, 2015.
- IV International Artists in Residence. Exhibition Hall of the Art Fund, Kursk, September 24–November 24, 2014.
- Being Changed – A Group Exhibition of International Contemporary Art. MoCA – Museum of Contemporary Art, Taipei, March 8–April 14, 2013.
- Sagmeister. Another Show About Promotion and Advertising Material. Sejong Museum of Art, Seoul, September 22–November 25, 2012.
- Art from the Heart. Vanderbuilt Republic, 25CPW, Central Park West, New York, November 2011

== Publications (selected) ==
- Awdur ap Glynn, Stanisław Kordasiewicz, Sylvia Ngo, Tomasz Wicherkiewicz, Kyunney Takasaeva (2026): Naming and Being: Knowledges, Identities and Cultural Politics. London: Routledge. ISBN 978-1-032-55707-6
- Wessel, Elias (2023): Ästhetik des Konflikts [Aesthetics of Conflict]. Dortmund: Verlag Kettler. ISBN 978-3-98741-044-4.
- Robinson, Carl et al. (2022): Painting, Photography, and the Digital: Crossing the Borders of the Mediums. Newcastle upon Tyne: Cambridge Scholars Publishing. ISBN 1-5275-8917-X
- Wessel, Elias et al. (2022): Textfetzen. It’s Complicated: Texte aus einem a/sozialen Netzwerk 2019–2021. Ist möglicherweise Kunst [Textfetzen. It's Complicated: Texts From an Anti/Social Network 2019–2021. Is Possibly Art.] Berlin: Kulturverlag Kadmos. ISBN 978-3-86599-527-8
- Wessel, Elias / Berg, Stephan / Graser, Jenny (2020): Elias Wessel : La somme de mes données. Embassy of the Federal Republic of Germany Paris (ed.), Berlin-Paris: Phoebe Verlag. ISBN 978-3-00-064672-0.
- Wessel, Elias / Graser, Jenny (2018): EliasWessel. Die Summe meiner Daten – Digitalisierung, Überwachung, Identität [The Sum of My Data. Digitization, Surveillance, Identity.] Kunstverein Speyer e. V. (ed.), New York-Speyer: Phoebe. ISBN 978-3-00-061315-9.
- Wessel, Elias et al. (2018): Landscapes – In the end, though, nothing is lost. Deutsches Haus at New York University, NYU Arts & Science (ed.), New York: Phoebe. ISBN 978-3-00-059460-1.
- Wessel, Elias / Gisbourne, Mark (2017): Elias Wessel. Photographische Arbeiten aus den Jahren 2014–2017 [Photographic Works Between the Years 2014–2017.] 1014 and Consulate General of the Federal Republic of Germany New York (ed.), New York: Phoebe. ISBN 978-3-00-057962-2.
- Wessel, Elias / Oreamuno, Ignacio / Dailey, Meghan (2014): Elias Wessel: There Must Be More To Life. Hamburg: NBVD 2014. ISBN 978-3-939028-40-6.

== Essays (selected) ==
- Saunders, Matt (2022): »Connoisseur of Chaos: Wessel’s Broken Picture Space.« In: Wessel, Elias et al. (2023): Aesthetics of Conflict. Dortmund: Kettler Verlag. [Deutsche Übersetzung: »Connaisseur des Chaos: Wessels zerbrochener Bildraum.«]
- Isaac, Gwyneira (2022): »Mind the Gap. Elias Wessel’s ›Ereignishorizonte‹ [Event Horizons] and the Thermodynamics of TikTok.« In: Wessel, Elias et al. (2023): Aesthetics of Conflict. Dortmund: Kettler Verlag. [Deutsche Übersetzung: »Mind the Gap. Elias Wessels ›Ereignishorizonte‹ und die Thermodynamiken von TikTok.«]
- Horak, Ruth (2022): »Der Bildschirm ist nie leer.« In: Wessel, Elias et al. (2023): Ästhetik des Konflikts. Arbeiten aus den Jahren 2017–2021. Dortmund: Kettler Verlag. [English translation: »The Screen Is Never Empty.«]
- Girshovich, Alina (2022): »This is Art: A Perpetually Relevant Response.« In: Wessel, Elias et al. (2023): Aesthetics of Conflict. Dortmund: Kettler Verlag. [Deutsche Übersetzung: »Das ist Kunst: Eine immerwährend relevante Antwort.«]
- Kratzer, Nikolaus (2022): »Images Through an Algorithmic Lens – Zur Visualisierung der Wirklichkeit.« In: Wessel, Elias et al. (2023): Ästhetik des Konflikts. Arbeiten aus den Jahren 2017–2021. Dortmund: Kettler Verlag. [English translation: »Images Through an Algorithmic Lens. On the Visualization of Reality.«]
- Neuberger, Christoph (2022): »The Way Back From the Digital to the Analog: On Elias Wessel’s ›Textfetzen.‹« In: Wessel, Elias et al. (2022): Textfetzen. It’s Complicated: Texte aus einem a/sozialen Netzwerk 2019−2021. Ist möglicherweise Kunst [Textfetzen. It’s Complicated: Texts From an Anti/Social Network 2019–2021. Is Possibly Art.] Berlin: Kulturverlag Kadmos.
- Gelfert, Axel (2022): »The Newsfeed as an Algorithmic Palimpsest.« In: Wessel, Elias et al. (2022): Textfetzen. It’s Complicated: Texte aus einem a/sozialen Netzwerk 2019−2021. Ist möglicherweise Kunst [Textfetzen. It's Complicated: Texts From an Anti/Social Network 2019–2021. Is Possibly Art.] Berlin: Kulturverlag Kadmos.
- Hermann von, Hans-Christian (2022): »Unsubstantiated Presence – Can Elias Wessel’s ›Textfetzen‹ Be Read?« In: Wessel, Elias et al. (2022): Textfetzen. It’s Complicated: Texte aus einem a/sozialen Netzwerk 2019−2021. Ist möglicherweise Kunst [Textfetzen. It’s Complicated: Texts From an Anti/Social Network 2019–2021. Is Possibly Art.] Berlin: Kulturverlag Kadmos.
- Brenne, Andreas (2021): »Photographs for the Next Society.« In: Wessel, Elias et al. (2022): Ästhetik des Konflikts. Arbeiten aus den Jahren 2017–2021 [Aesthetics of Conflict. Works 2017–2021.] Dortmund: Kettler Verlag.
- Herschel, Hans-Jürgen (2021): »Variations on ›The Joy in What Remains.‹« In: Wessel, Elias et al. (2022): Ästhetik des Konflikts. Arbeiten aus den Jahren 2017–2021 [Aesthetics of Conflict. Works 2017–2021.] Dortmund: Kettler Verlag.
- Kopplin, Bärbel (2021): »Fotografie als Versuchsanordnung und Denkprozess.«
- Guerin, Frances (2021): »Unsettled in the Interstice: Elias Wessel’s ›Die Summe meiner Daten.‹« In: Robinson, Carl (2022): Painting, Photography, and the Digital: Crossing the Borders of the Mediums. Newcastle: Cambridge Scholars Publishing.
- Wolff, Frank (2020): »Beyond the Digital Promise: Virtual Communities and Democracy in Recent Contemporary History.« In: Wessel, Elias et al. (2022): Ästhetik des Konflikts. Arbeiten aus den Jahren 2017–2021 [Aesthetics of Conflict. Works 2017–2021.] Dortmund: Kettler Verlag.
- Berg, Stephan (2020): »The Trace of the Body« In: Wessel, Elias et al. (2020): Elias Wessel : La somme de mes données. Embassy of the Federal Republic of Germany Paris (ed.), Berlin-Paris: Phoebe Verlag.
- Graser, Jenny (2018): »Abstrakte Realitäten. EliasWessel – ›Die Summe meiner Daten.‹« In: Wessel, Elias / Graser, Jenny (2018): Elias Wessel. Die Summe meiner Daten – Digitalisierung, Überwachung, Identität. Kunstverein Speyer e. V. (ed.), New York-Speyer: Phoebe Verlag.
- Schoen, Christian (2017): »Sprung in die Zeit. Anmerkungen zum Wesen der Bilder.«
- Wolff, Frank (2017): »The soothing power of speed: Elias Wessel’s Landscapes in the cultural history of Russian space perception« In: Wessel, Elias et al. (2018): Landscapes – In the end, though, nothing is lost. Deutsches Haus at New York University, NYU Arts & Science (ed.), New York: Phoebe.
- Gisbourne, Mark (2017): »Visions of Synthesis. The Photography of Elias Wessel.« In: Wessel, Elias / Gisbourne, Mark (2017): Photographische Arbeiten aus den Jahren 2014–2017 [Photographic Works Between the Years 2014–2017.] New York: Phoebe Verlag 2017.
- Graser, Jenny (2015): »The ›Landscapes I-VII‹ (2014) By Elias Wessel – ›In the End, Though, Nothing Is Lost.‹« In: Wessel, Elias et al. (2018): Landscapes – In the end, though, nothing is lost. Deutsches Haus at New York University, NYU Arts & Science (ed.), New York: Phoebe Verlag.

== Collections (selected) ==
- Kunstsammlung des Deutschen Bundestages, Berlin (2020)
- Kunstsammlung Spallart, Salzburg (2019, 2021)
- Kunstsammlung AXA, Cologne (2015, 2021)

== Selected works ==
- Serials, 2022–2026
- Anemoia, 2024
- Nostalgia, 2023–2024
- Space Invaders, 2023
- Textfetzen, 2021–2022
- Deepfakes – Image Swap, 2021–2022
- Deepfakes – Privacy, 2022
- Ereignishorizonte, 2021
- Quick Response, 2021
- Schöne neue Welt – The Moving Images, 2020–2021
- Schöne neue Welt, 2019–2020
- It's Complicated, 2019–2021
- Images Through an Algorithmic Lens, 2018–2019
- Die Freude am Rest – Zur Entmaterialisierung der Bilder, 2018
- Die Summe meiner Daten – On Series, 2017
- Die Summe meiner Daten – B/W Series, 2017
- Die Summe meiner Daten – Off Series, 2017
- Hinter den Dingen, 2017
- Jejune, 2016
- Liebst, 2016
- Feral, 2015–2016
- Cityscapes, 2014–2015
- Landscapes, 2014
- Sprung in die Zeit, 2014
