= Kunstverein =

Kunstverein may refer to:

== Germany ==
- Neuer Aachener Kunstverein, an art association, founded in 1986 in Aachen
- Kunstverein Arnsberg, an association for contemporary art in Arnsberg
- Badischer Kunstverein, an art association in Karlsruhe
- Der Kunstverein in Bremen, an art society which operates the Kunsthalle Bremen in Bremen
- Frankfurter Kunstverein, an art museum in Frankfurt
- Kunstverein in Hamburg, a venue for contemporary art exhibitions in Hamburg
- Kunstverein Hannover, an art association in Hanover
- Kölnischer Kunstverein, a former art association in Cologne, that now refers to an art gallery of the same name
- Kunstverein München, an association for contemporary art founded in 1823 in Munich
- Mannheimer Kunstverein, an art association that operates the Kunsthalle Mannheim in Mannheim
- Kunstverein Nürnberg, a venue for contemporary art exhibitions in Nuremberg
- Württembergischer Kunstverein Stuttgart, one of the biggest and oldest art societies in Germany located in Stuttgart

== Switzerland ==
- Kunstverein Winterthur, an art society that operates the Kunstmuseum Winterthur in Winterthur
- Verein Kunsthalle Zürich, an art society that operates the Kunsthalle Zürich in Zürich

== See also ==
- Kunstmuseum (disambiguation)
- Kunsthalle
