= Istanbul Sapphire =

Skyscraper located in the central business district of Levent in Istanbul

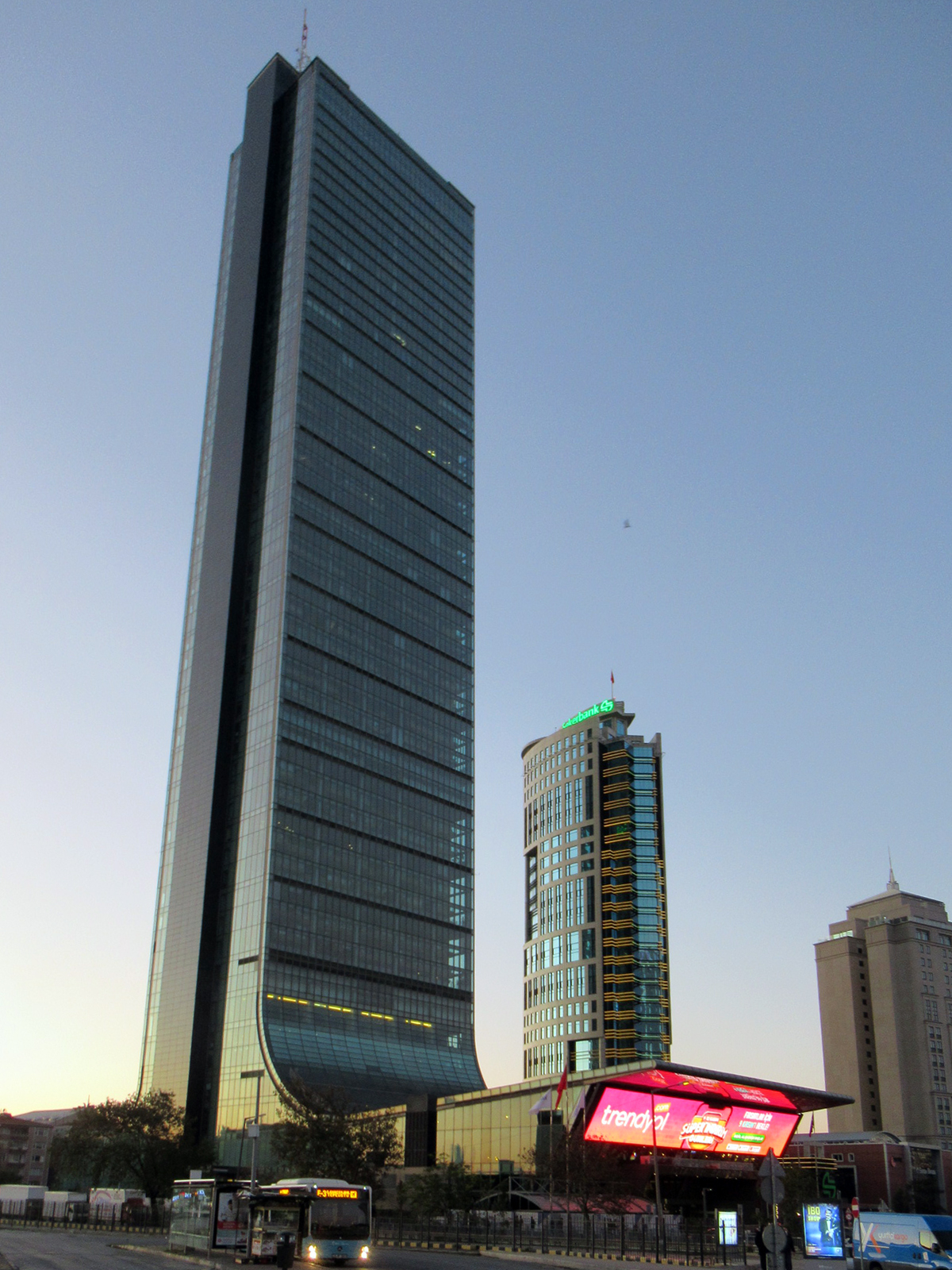
- A view of the tower from Büyükdere Avenue
- Interactive map of the Istanbul Sapphire area

General information
- Status: Completed
- Type: Residential
- Location: Büyükdere Avenue, Levent, Istanbul, Turkey
- Coordinates: 41°05′06″N 29°00′21″E
- Opening: 4 March 2011
- Cost: US$150,000,000

Height
- Antenna spire: 261 m (856 ft)
- Roof: 238 m (781 ft)

Technical details
- Floor count: 54 (above ground); 10 (below ground); 64 (total)
- Floor area: 165,139 m^{2} (1,777,540 sq ft)

Design and construction
- Architect: Tabanlıoğlu Architects
- Developer: Kiler GYO

Other information
- Public transit access: 4. Levent

Website
- www.sapphireavym.com

Istanbul Sapphire, or Sapphire, is a residential skyscraper located in the central business district of Levent in Istanbul, Turkey.

It was Istanbul's and Turkey's tallest skyscraper between 2010 and 2016, and the 4th tallest building in Europe when its construction was completed in 2010. Sapphire rises 54 floors above ground level, and has an above-ground roof height of 238 meters: the building has an overall structural height of 261 meters including its spire, which is part of the design and not a radio antenna. Designed by Tabanlıoğlu Architects, it is a shopping and luxury residence mixed-use development managed by Kiler GYO. It is also the country's first ecological skyscraper.

As of 2020, Istanbul Sapphire is the 4th tallest skyscraper in Istanbul and Turkey, behind the 284-meter-tall twin towers of Skyland İstanbul located adjacent to Türk Telekom Stadium in the Seyrantepe quarter of the Sarıyer district, on the European side, and the 280-meter-tall Metropol Istanbul Tower in the Ataşehir district on the Asian side of the city.

== History and architecture ==
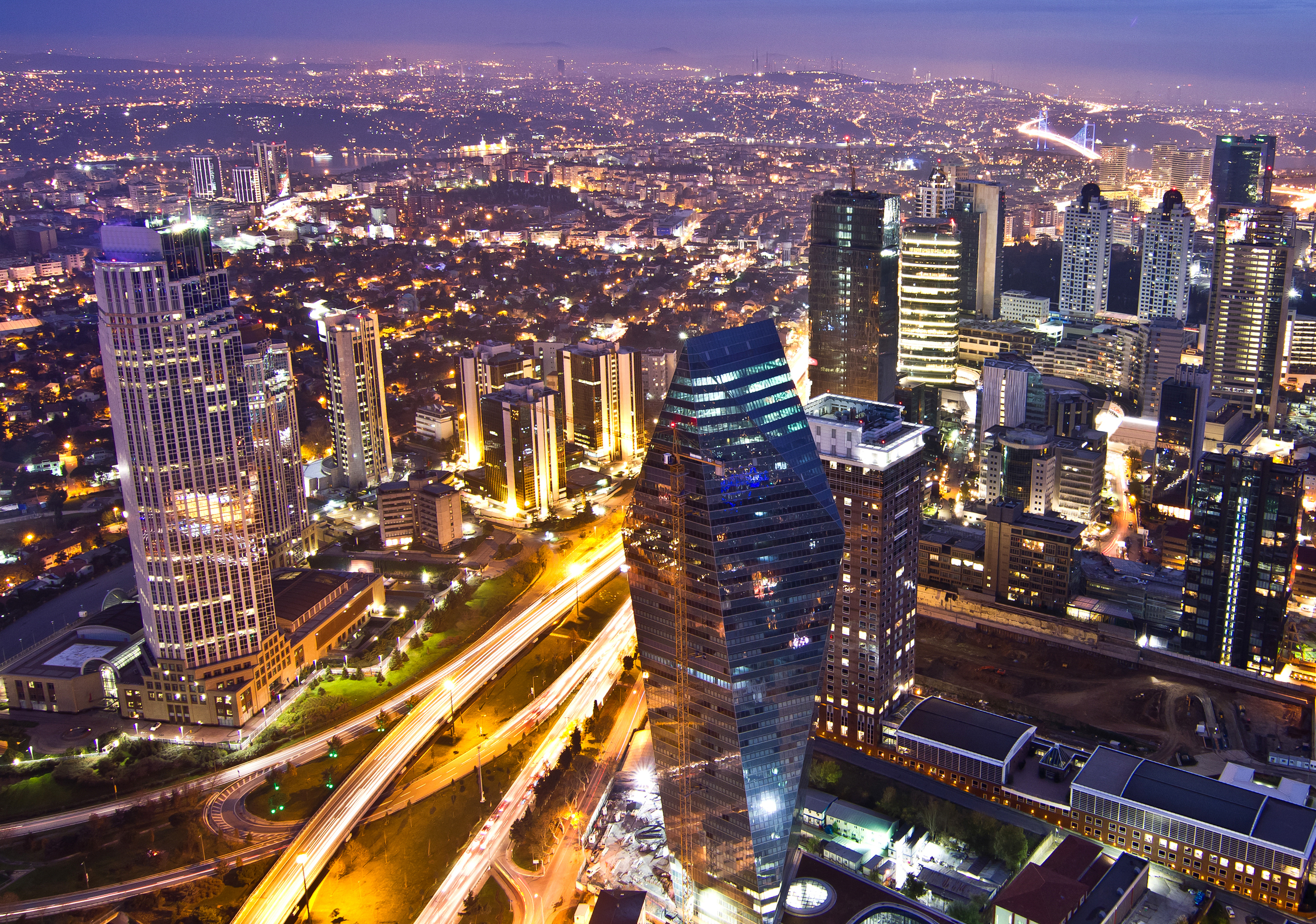
A view of Levent business district from the observation deck of Istanbul Sapphire at night

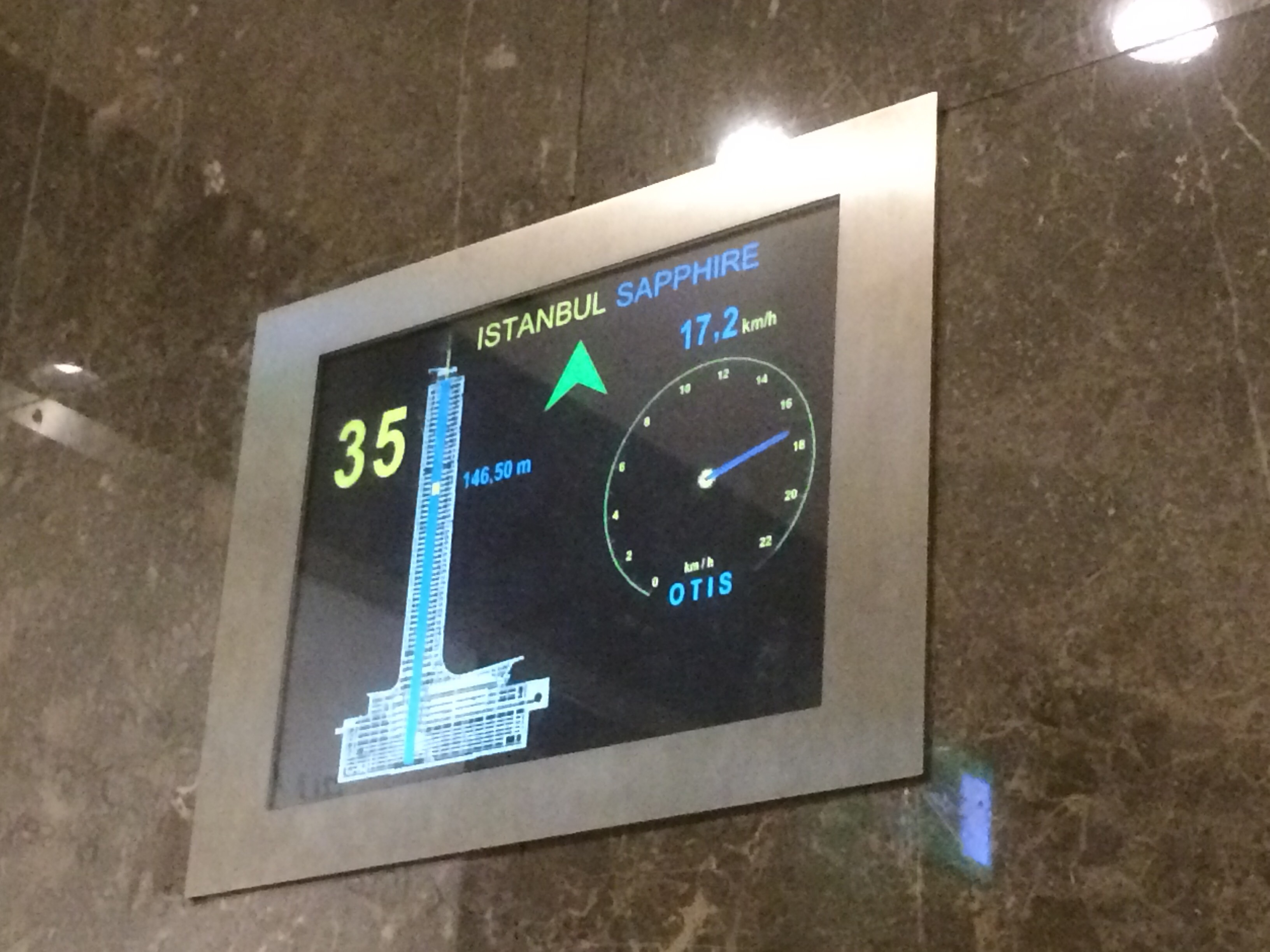
Elevator screen of Istanbul Sapphire

Istanbul Sapphire was designed by Tabanlıoğlu Architects as a high-tech structure which consists of 64 floors (54 above-ground and 10 basement floors), communal living floors, extensive parking spaces, a large shopping mall, and 47 floors for residential use.

There are special floors with private gardens between every 3 floors, and every 9 floors are separated from each other by a communal living area or mechanical floors. Design of the gardens are proposed with a number of alternatives and the consistency of garden maintenance is under the residence management company's responsibility.

== Turkey's deepest excavated construction pit ==
The foundation pit excavated for the project – 42.5 meters deep – is the deepest foundation pit excavated for any structure in Turkey.

== Construction work ==
Construction of the project began in 2006 and was completed in 2010. The building's official opening ceremony took place on 4 March 2011.

The project is built on a land plot of 11,339 m^{2} (122,050 sq ft) and has an overall total construction area of 157,800 m^{2} (1,699,000 sq ft), which includes a 35,000 m^{2} (380,000 sq ft) shopping mall.

=== Companies ===
The companies involved in the development and construction of the project have included thus far:

- Kiler GYO (investor and developer)
- Güney Turizm (Mustafa Tatlıcı, owner of the plot)
- Biskon Yapı (construction subsidiary of Kiler Holding and the project's main construction company)
- Demsar İnşaat (project's sub-contractor for the structural construction of the skyscraper)
- Tabanlıoğlu Architects (the project's architectural design firm)
- Ruscheweyh Consult GmbH (consulting firm with expertise in wind loads on buildings and structures)

== Gallery ==
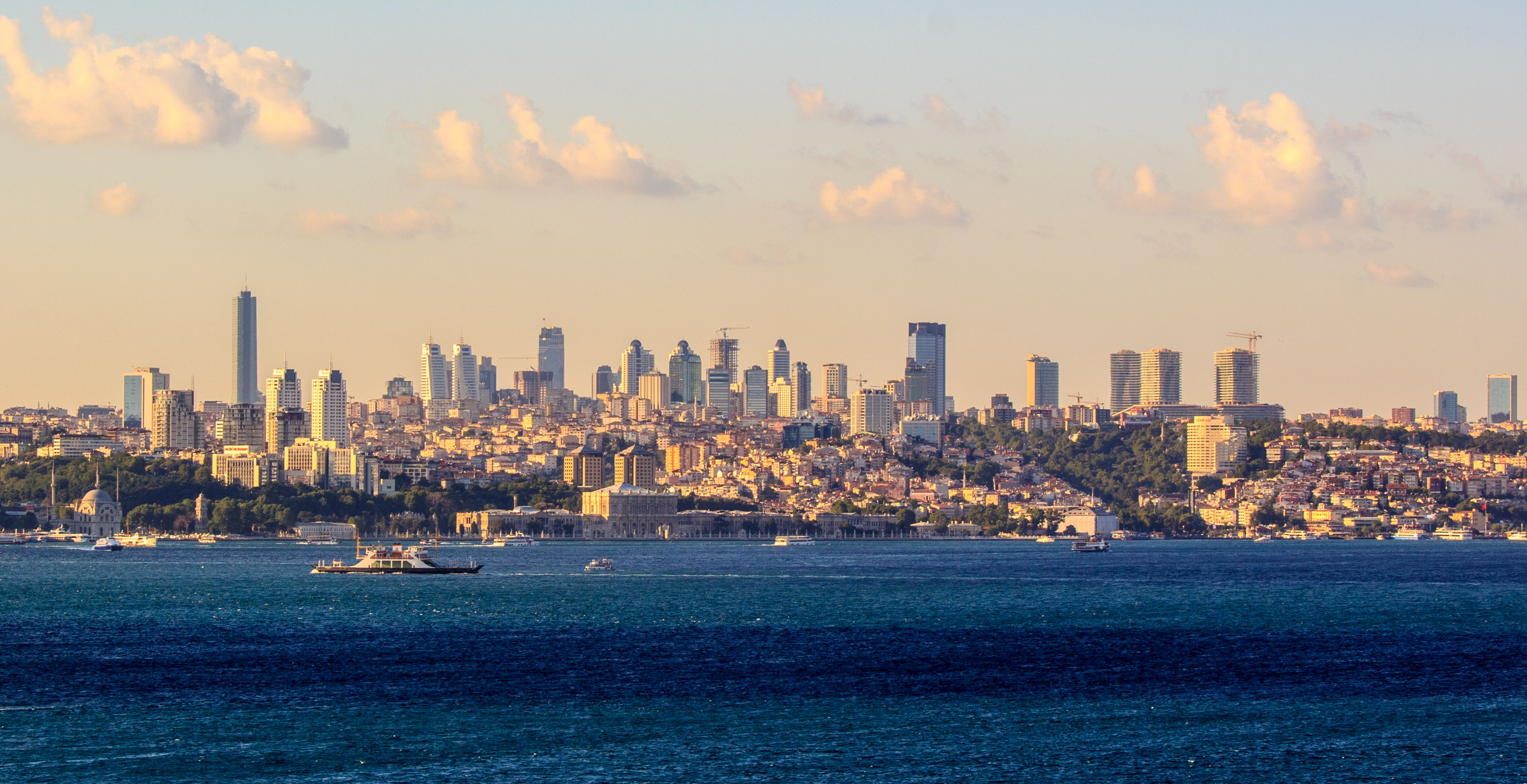
A distant view of Levent from the Bosphorus strait. Istanbul Sapphire is the tallest skyscraper on the left.

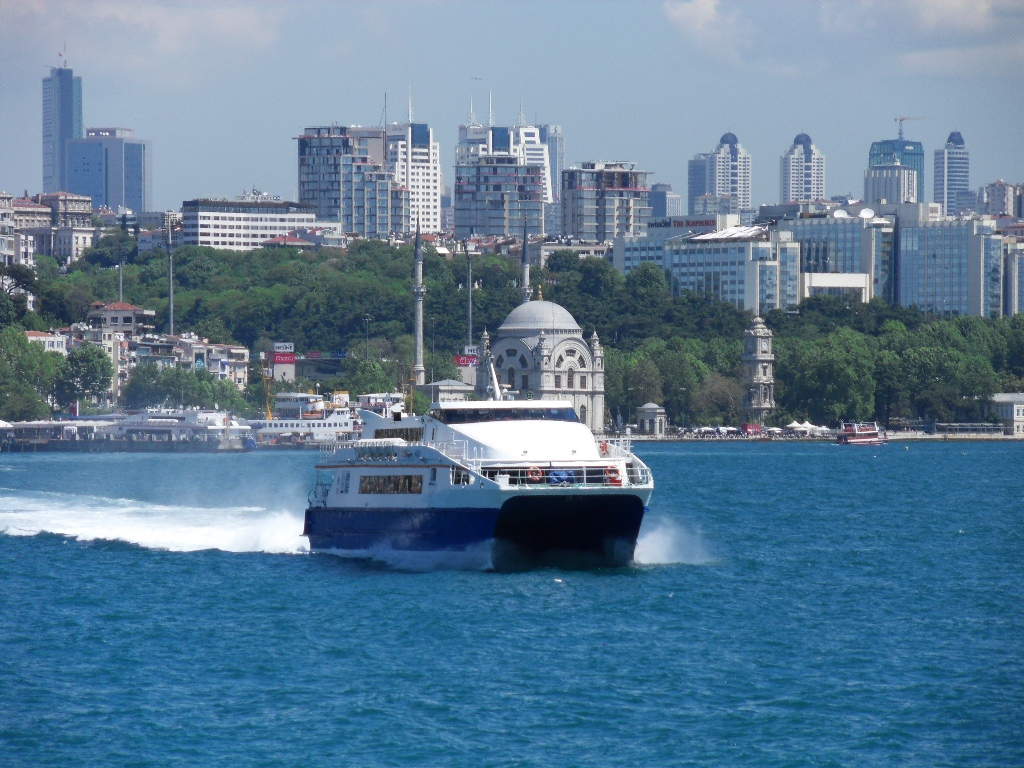
A catamaran Seabus on the Bosphorus, with the skyscrapers of Levent business district in the background. Istanbul Sapphire is the first skyscraper on the left.

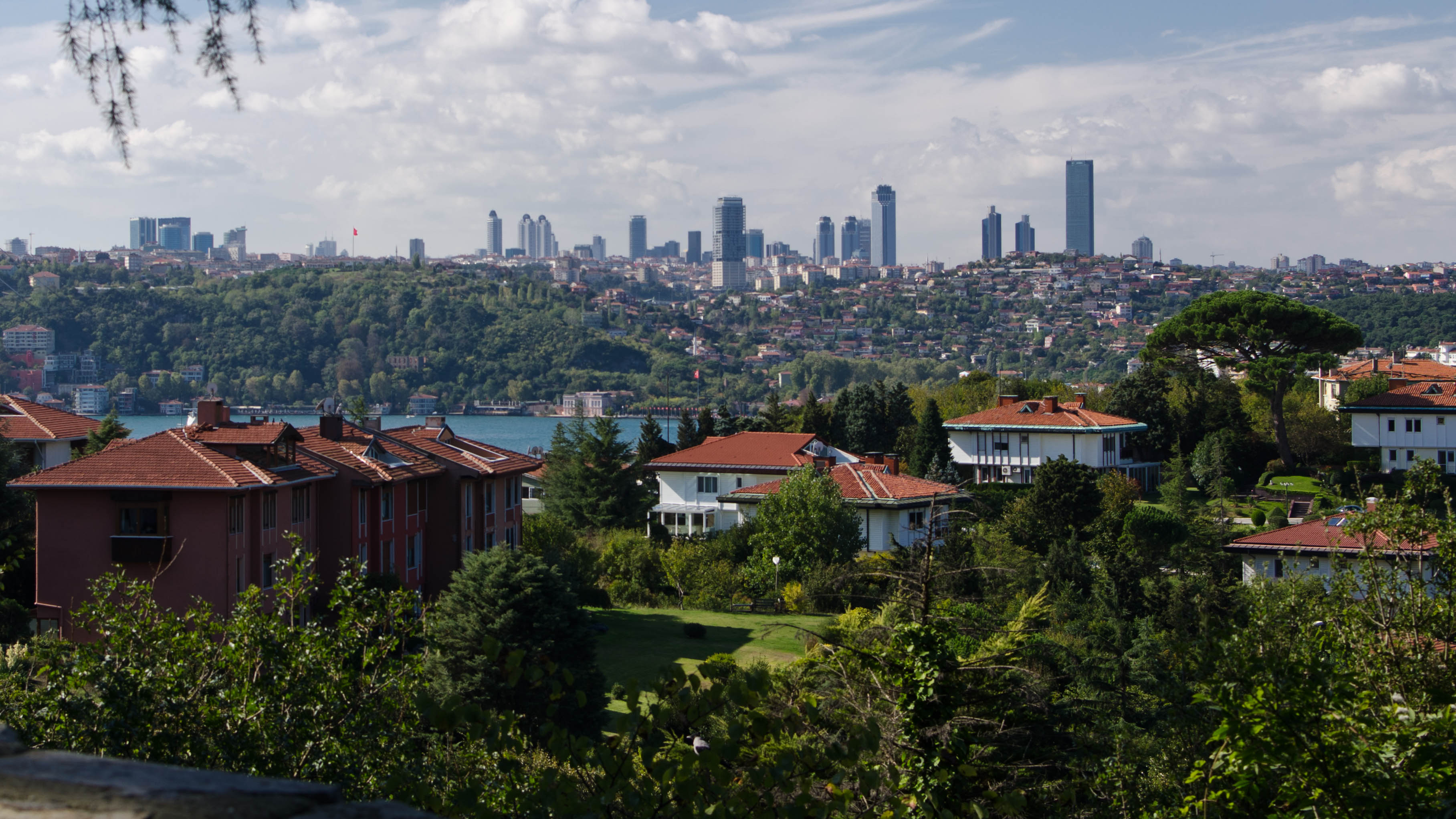
View of Levent from Kanlıca Hekimler Sitesi on the Asian side of the Bosphorus. Istanbul Sapphire is the first skyscraper on the right.

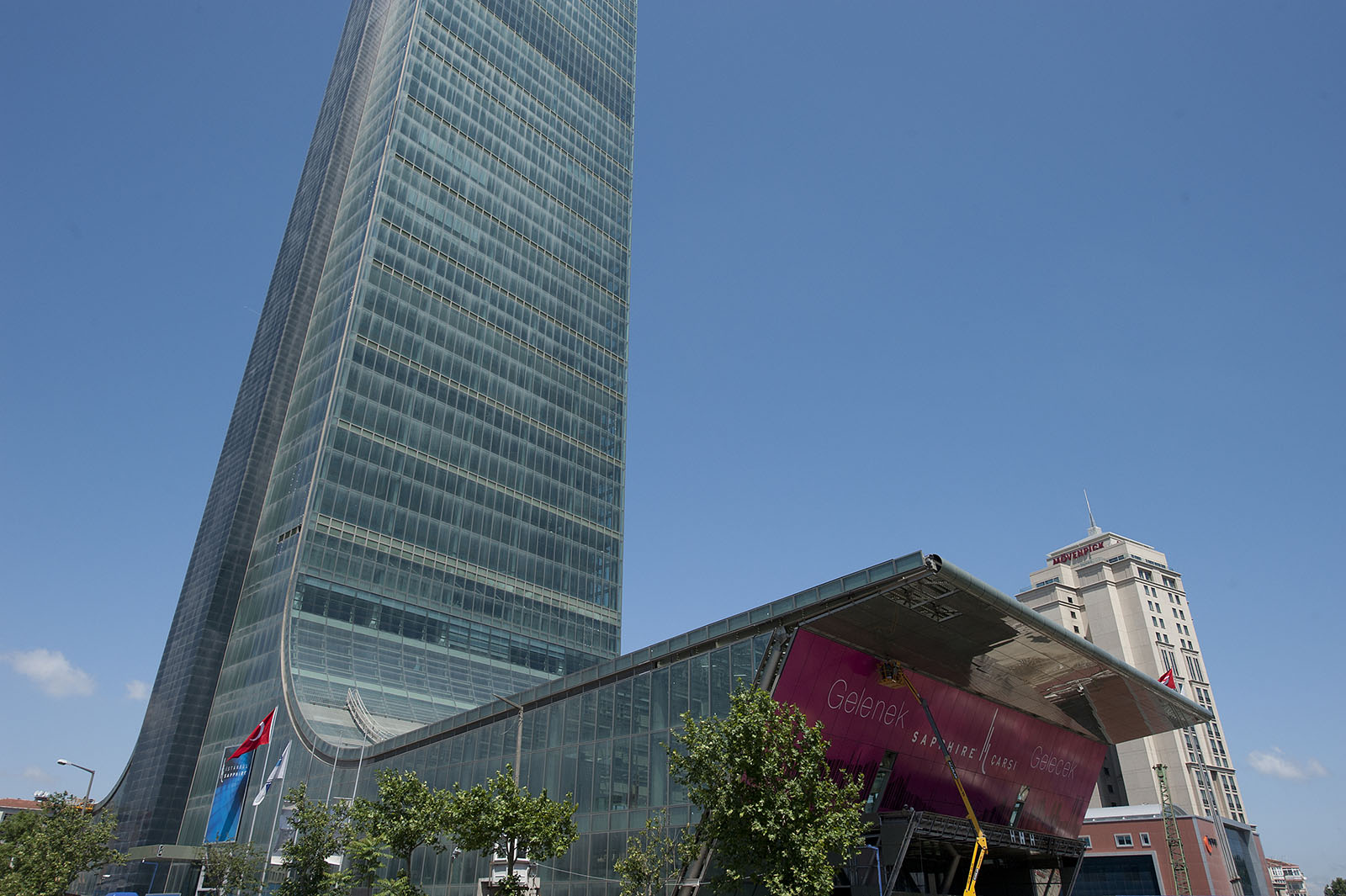
Istanbul Sapphire during construction

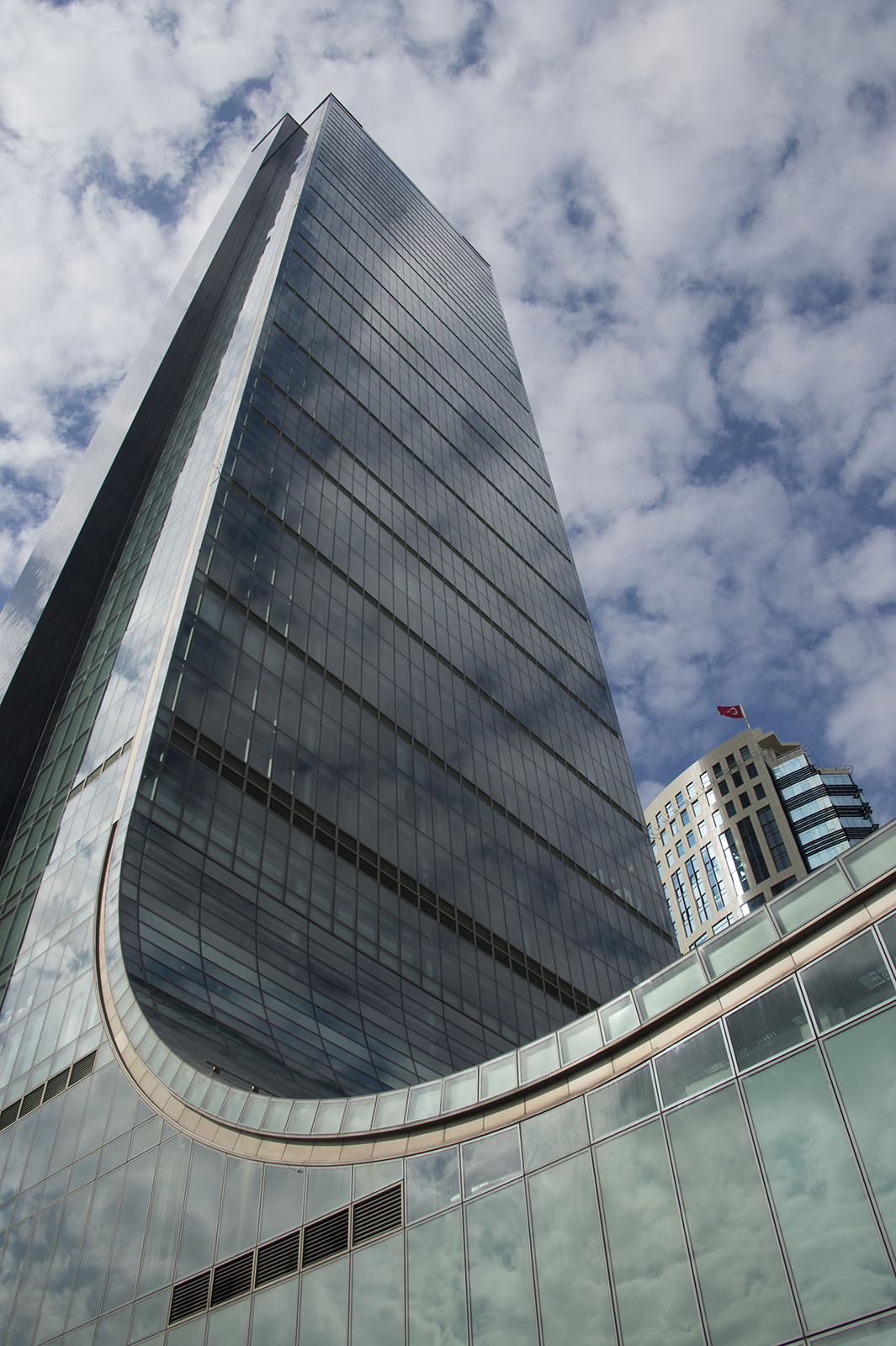
Istanbul Sapphire: View of the building's front facade from street level

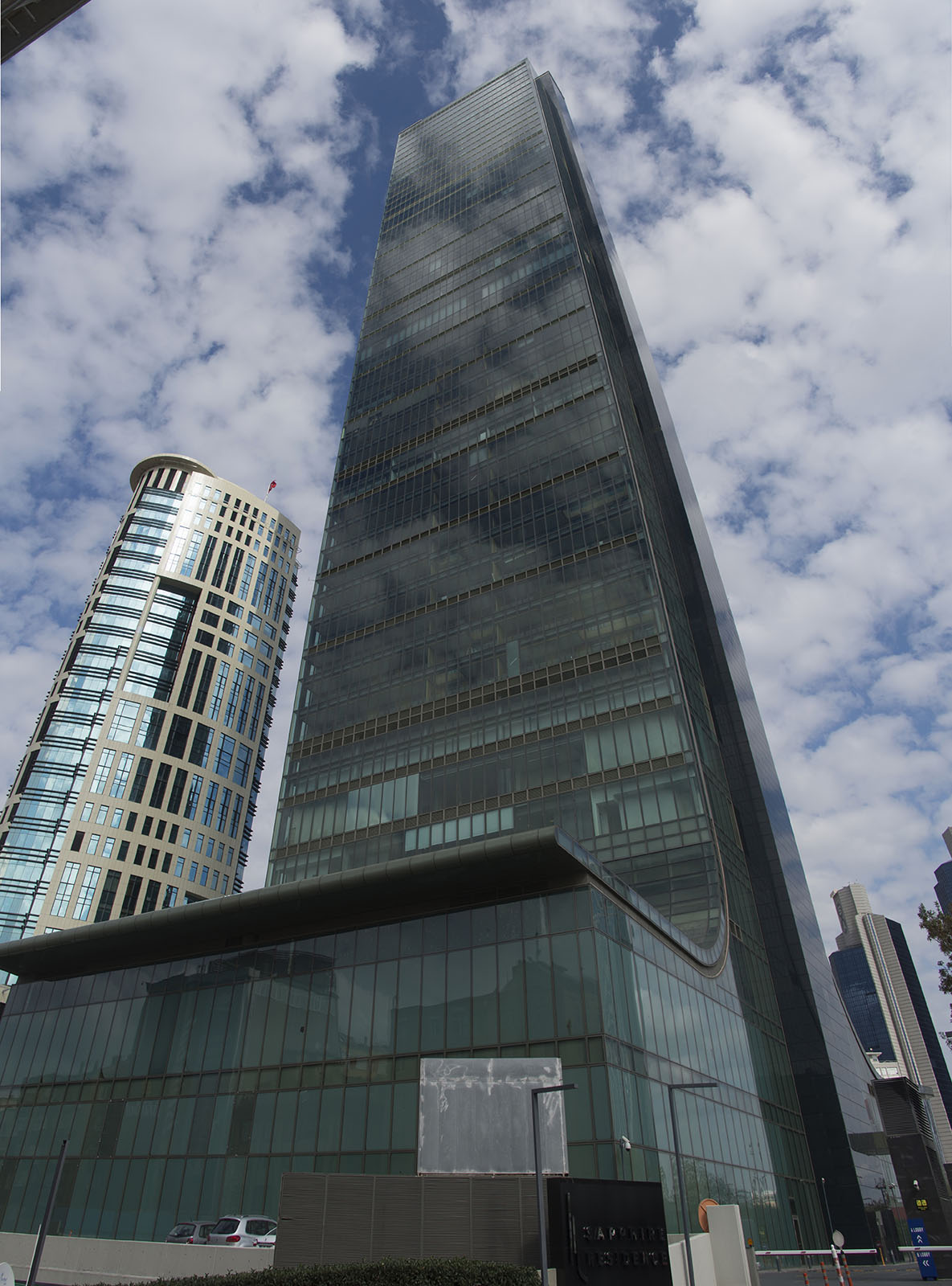
Istanbul Sapphire: View of the building's rear facade from street level

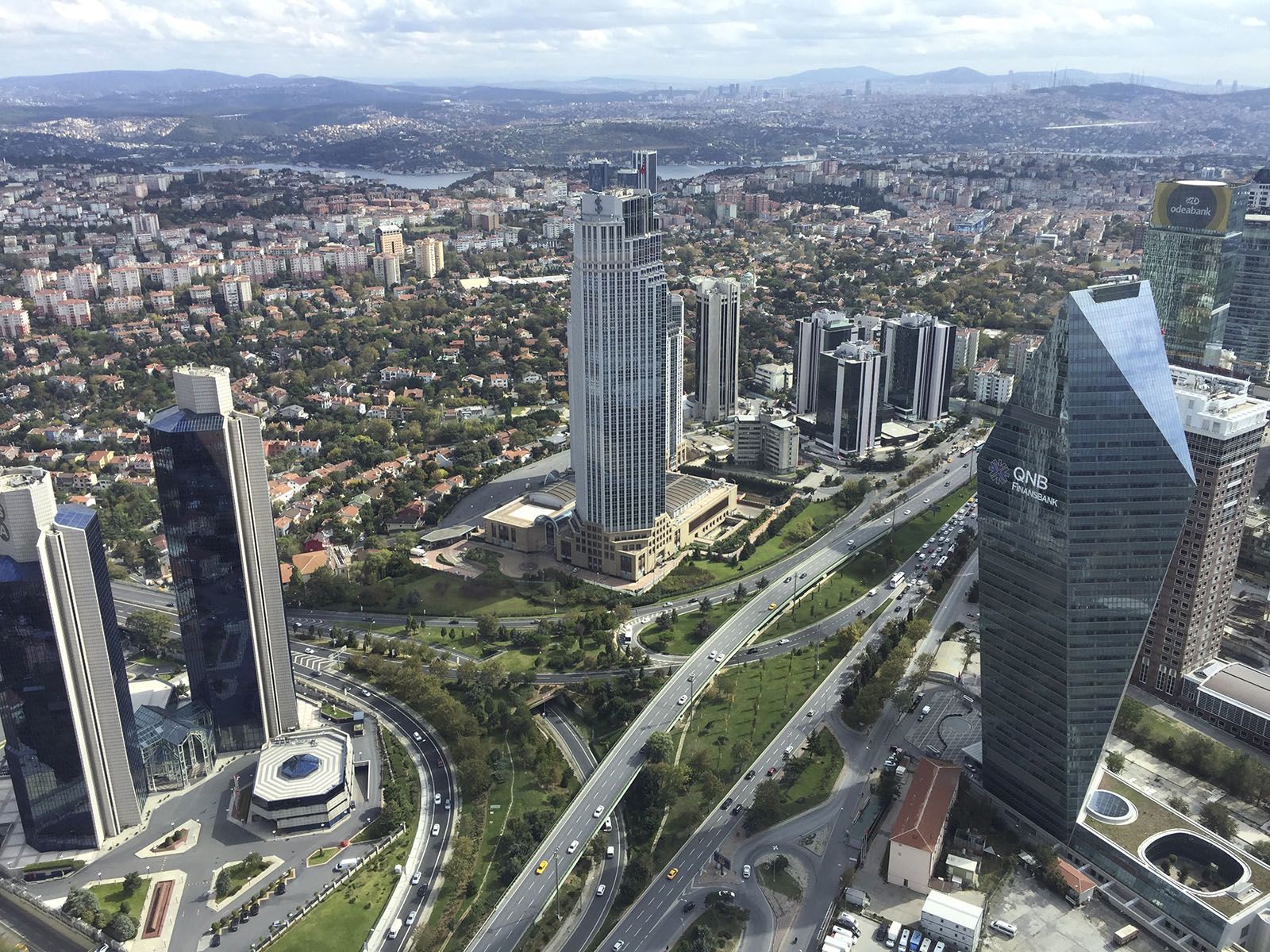
View of the İşbank, Yapı Kredi and Finansbank towers from the roof of Istanbul Sapphire

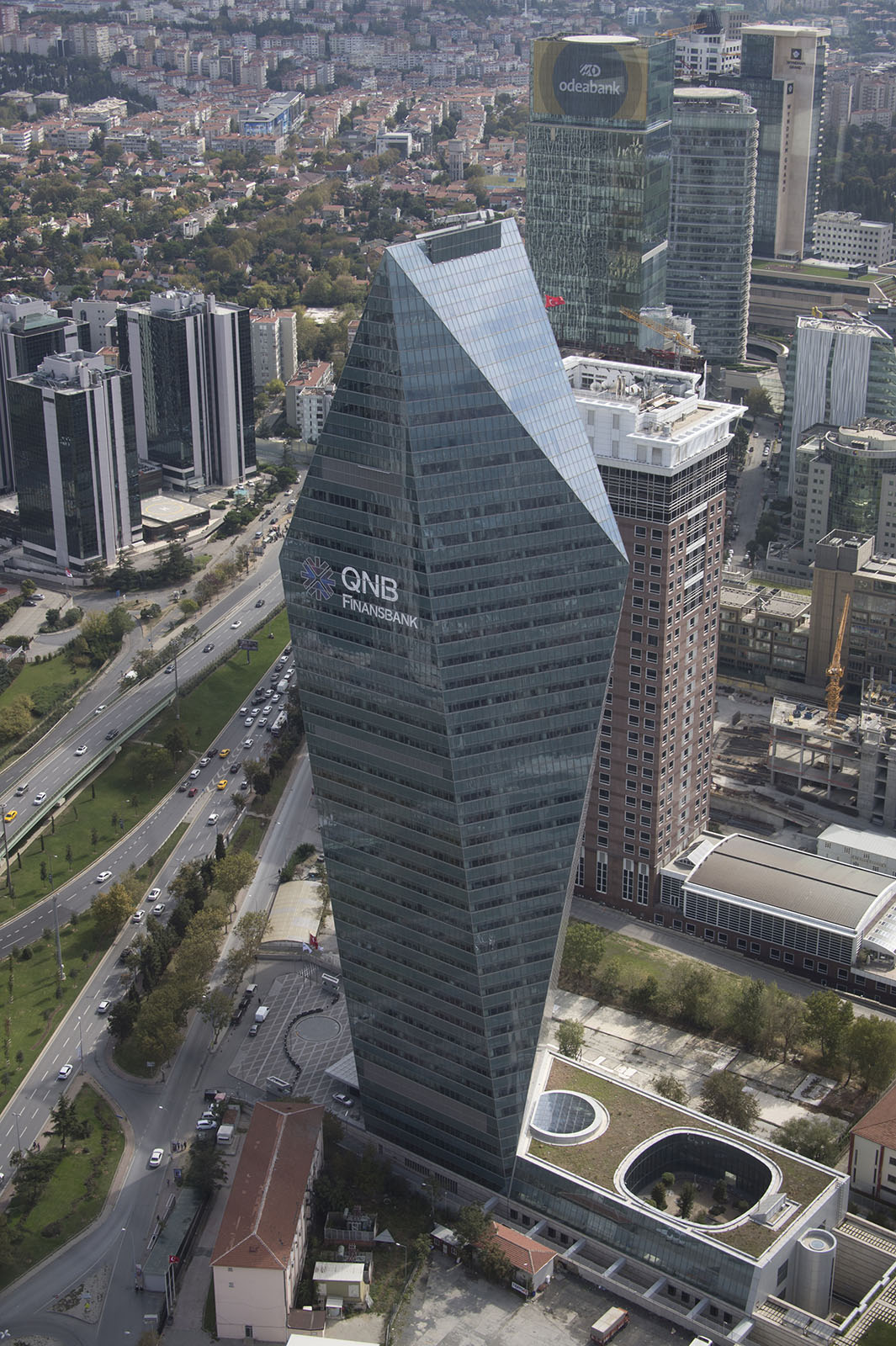
View from the observation deck of Istanbul Sapphire

== See also ==
- List of tallest buildings in Istanbul
- List of tallest buildings in Turkey
- List of tallest buildings in Europe

| Preceded by İşbank Tower 1 | Tallest Building in Istanbul; 2010—2017; 261 m | Succeeded by Skyland İstanbul |
| Preceded by İşbank Tower 1 | Tallest Building in Turkey; 2010—2017; 261 m | Succeeded by Skyland İstanbul |
