= Kiler (company) =

Turkish conglomerate

Kiler Holding
- Company type: Public
- Traded as: BİST: KILER and KLGYO
- Industry: Conglomerate
- Founded: 1994; 32 years ago
- Founder: Kiler family
- Headquarters: Istanbul, Turkey
- Key people: Ümit Kiler (Chairman)
- Number of employees: 5,000
- Website: kiler.com.tr

Kiler Holding is a Turkish conglomerate, which consists of 22 companies with more than 5,000 employees, operating in the retail trade, real estate development, tourism and health sectors.

== History ==
From 1984, members of the Kiler family opened a number of supermarkets in the Istanbul area.

In 1994, these stores were incorporated as Kiler Supermarket Gıda Sanayi ve Tic. A.Ş.

Since 2000, the real estate interests of the group have been managed by a separate company, Kiler Gayrimenkul, and more recently for development of residential buildings and shopping centres. The flagship project of Kiler GYO is the Istanbul Sapphire skyscraper. By 2004 the group had 33 stores in the Istanbul area and acquired chains of supermarkets in other parts of Turkey.

By 2010 Kiler had 172 stores in 26 cities. Stores ranged from 600 to 2,500 m^{2}. In May 2015, CarrefourSA acquired Kiler's 201 stores for ₺429 million (US$162 million).
