= Tabanlıoğlu Architects =

Architectural firm based in Istanbul, Turkey

Tabanlıoğlu Architects (Tabanlıoğlu Mimarlık)
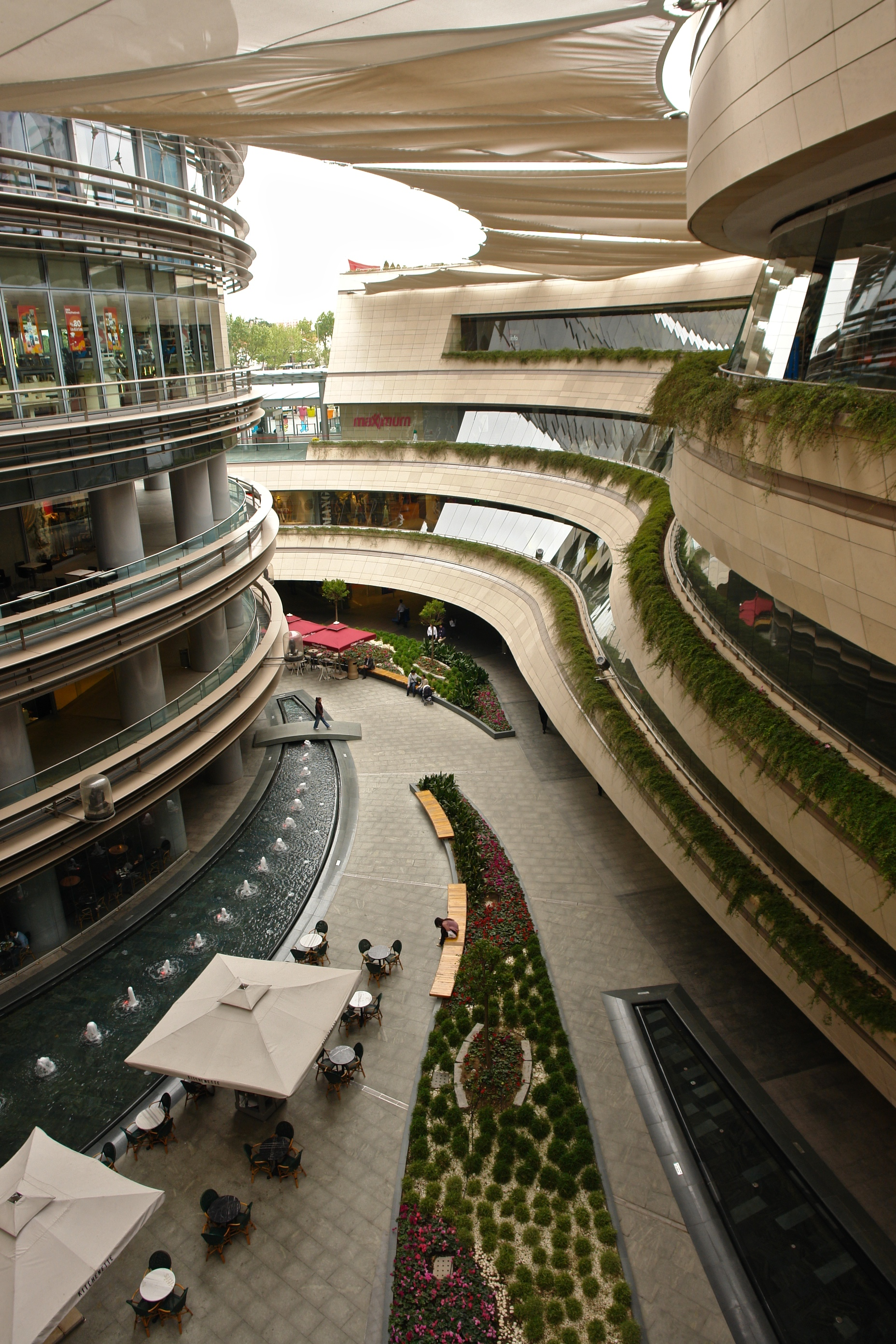
- Kanyon Mall

Practice information
- Key architects: Hayati Tabanlıoğlu, Murat Tabanlıoğlu, Melkan Tabanlıoğlu.
- Founded: 1956
- Location: Istanbul, Turkey

Significant works and honors
- Buildings: Istanbul Sapphire, Atatürk Cultural Center, İstanbul Modern
- Awards: RIBA International Award (2011)

Tabanlıoğlu Architects (Turkish: Tabanlıoğlu Mimarlık) is an architectural firm based in Istanbul. The practice is led by Murat Tabanlıoğlu, Melkan Tabanlıoğlu and Özdem Gürsel.

== Project list ==
Major projects, by year of completion and ordered by type, are:

=== Cultural ===
- 1977: Atatürk Cultural Center, Istanbul, Turkey
- 2004: İstanbul Modern (Istanbul Museum of Modern Art), Istanbul, Turkey

=== High rise ===
- 2011: Istanbul Sapphire, Istanbul, Turkey
- 2023: Vakıfbank Headquarters Tower, Istanbul, Turkey

=== Shopping mall ===
- 1986: Galleria Ataköy, Istanbul, Turkey
- 2006: Kanyon Shopping Mall, Istanbul (with Jerde Partnership)

=== Sport ===
- 2009: Astana Arena, Astana, Kazakhstan

=== Transportation ===
- 1984: Atatürk Airport, Istanbul, Turkey
- 1998: Milas–Bodrum Airport, Bodrum, Turkey
- 2017: Astana-Nurly Jol, Astana, Kazakhstan

== Awards ==
- 2011: RIBA International Award (with Loft Gardens project)

== Selected works ==
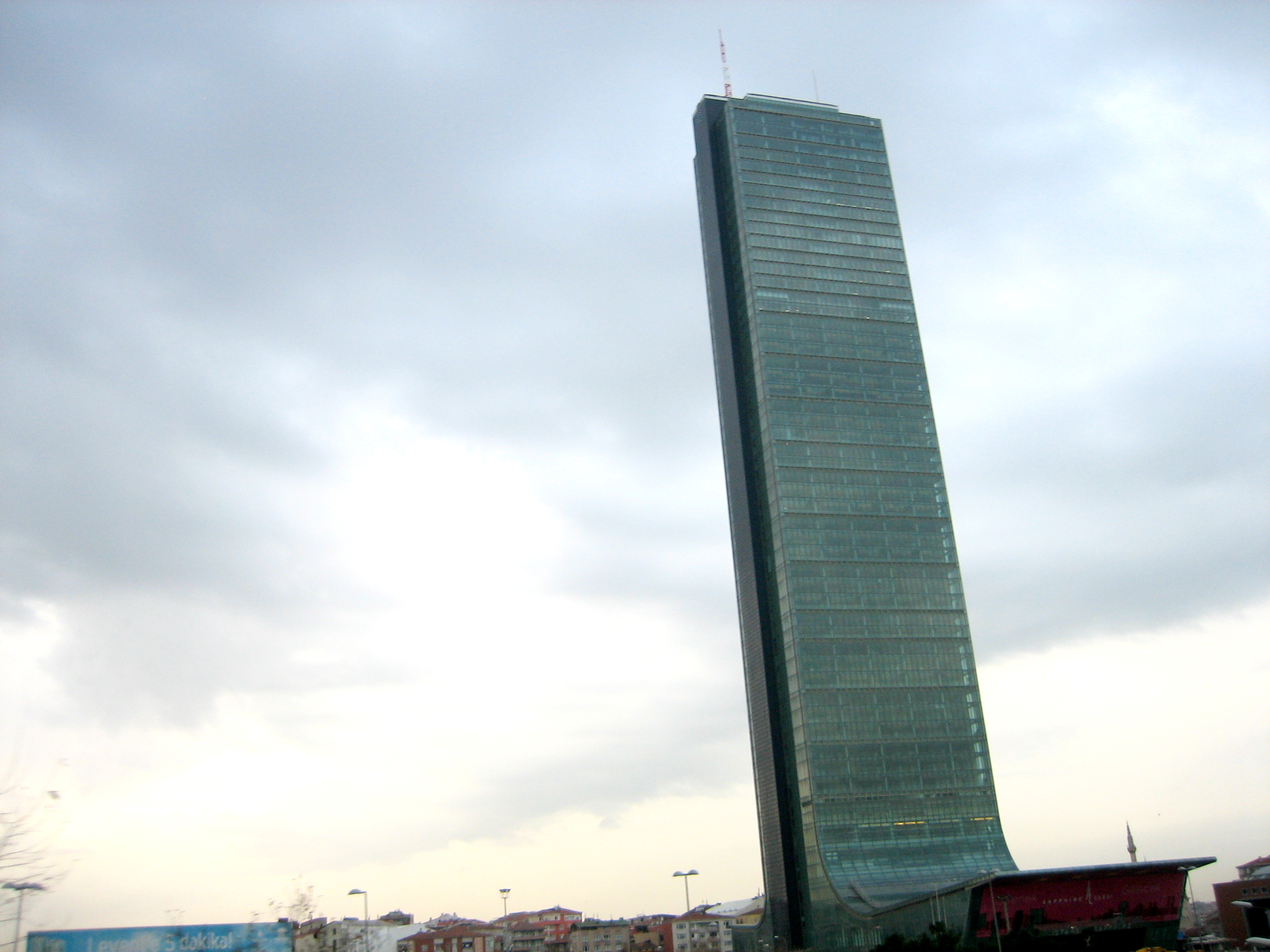
Designed by Tabanlıoğlu Architects, Istanbul Sapphire (2006–2011) used to be the tallest building in Turkey and 4th tallest in Europe.

Kanyon Shopping Mall

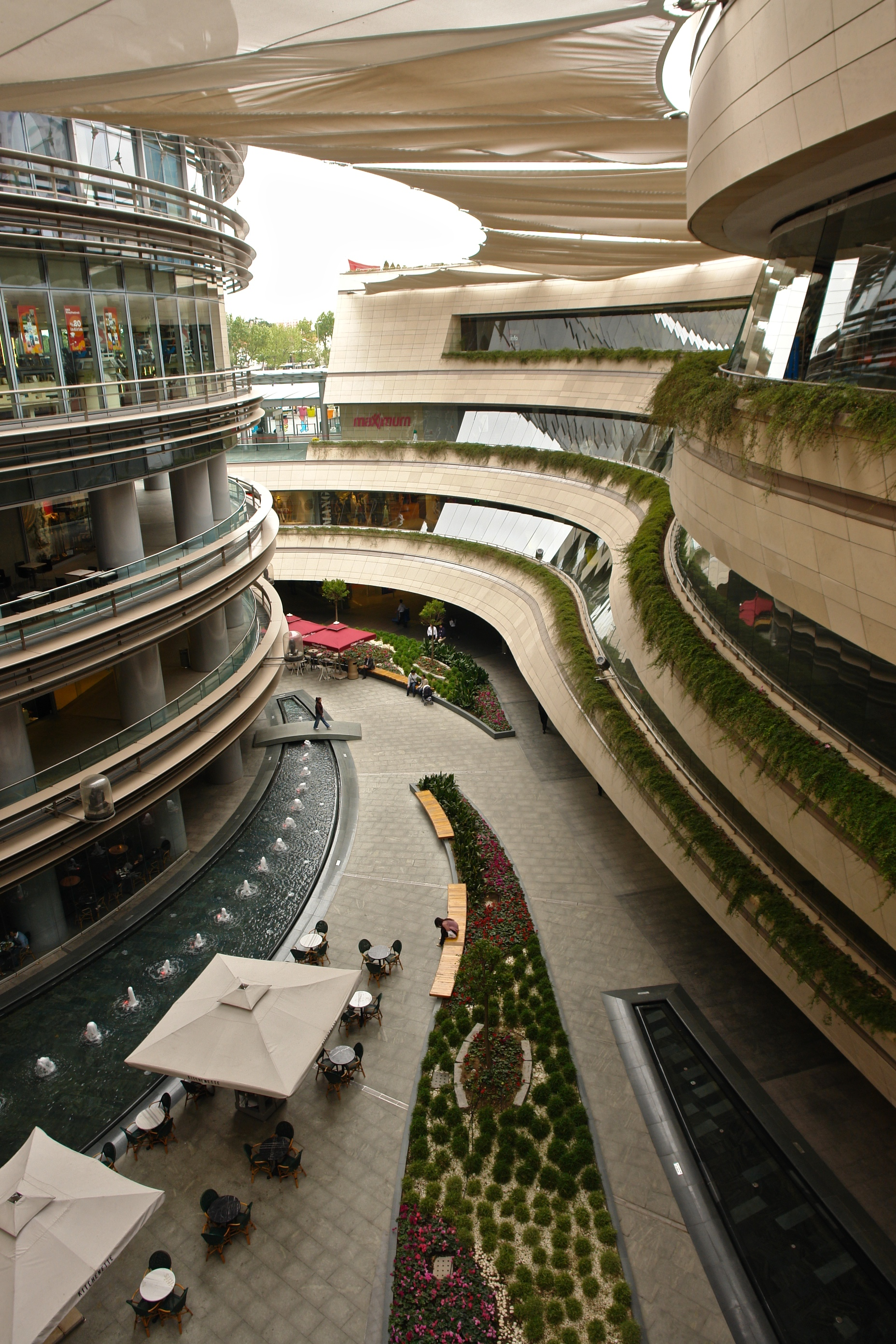
Kanyon Mall

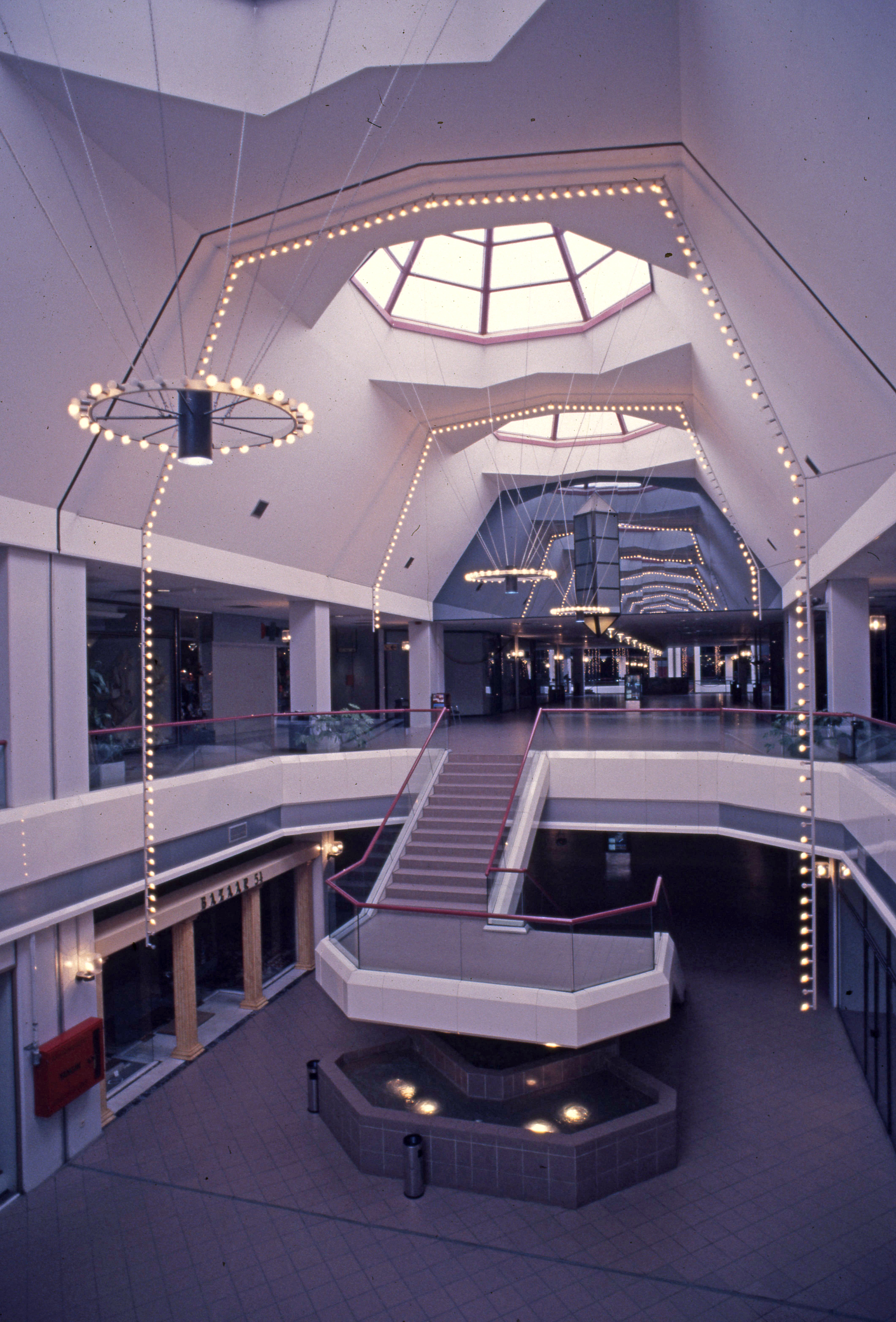
Galleria

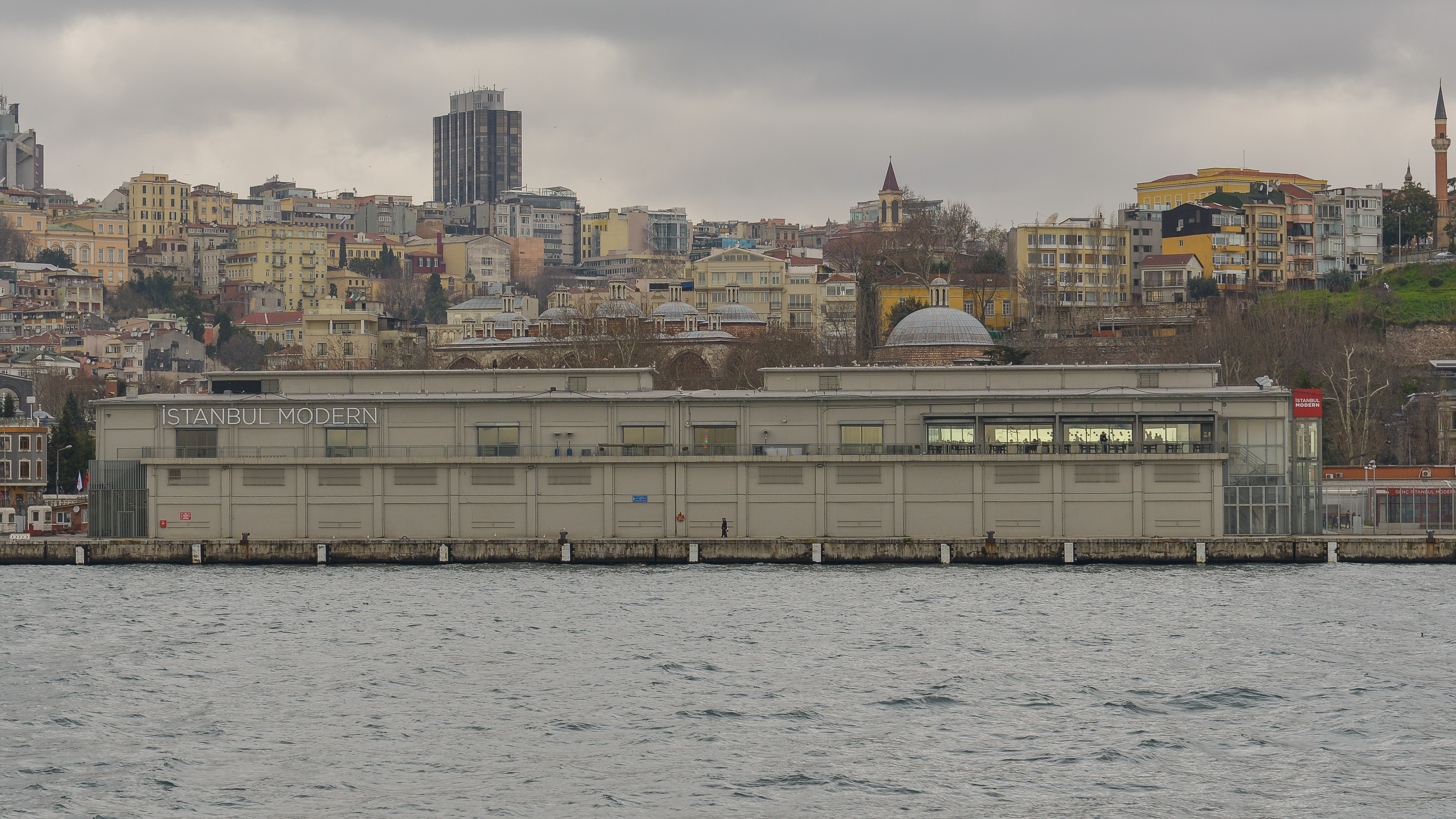
İstanbul Modern (2004) is the first contemporary art museum in Turkey. It was originally a warehouse building on the Bosphorus.

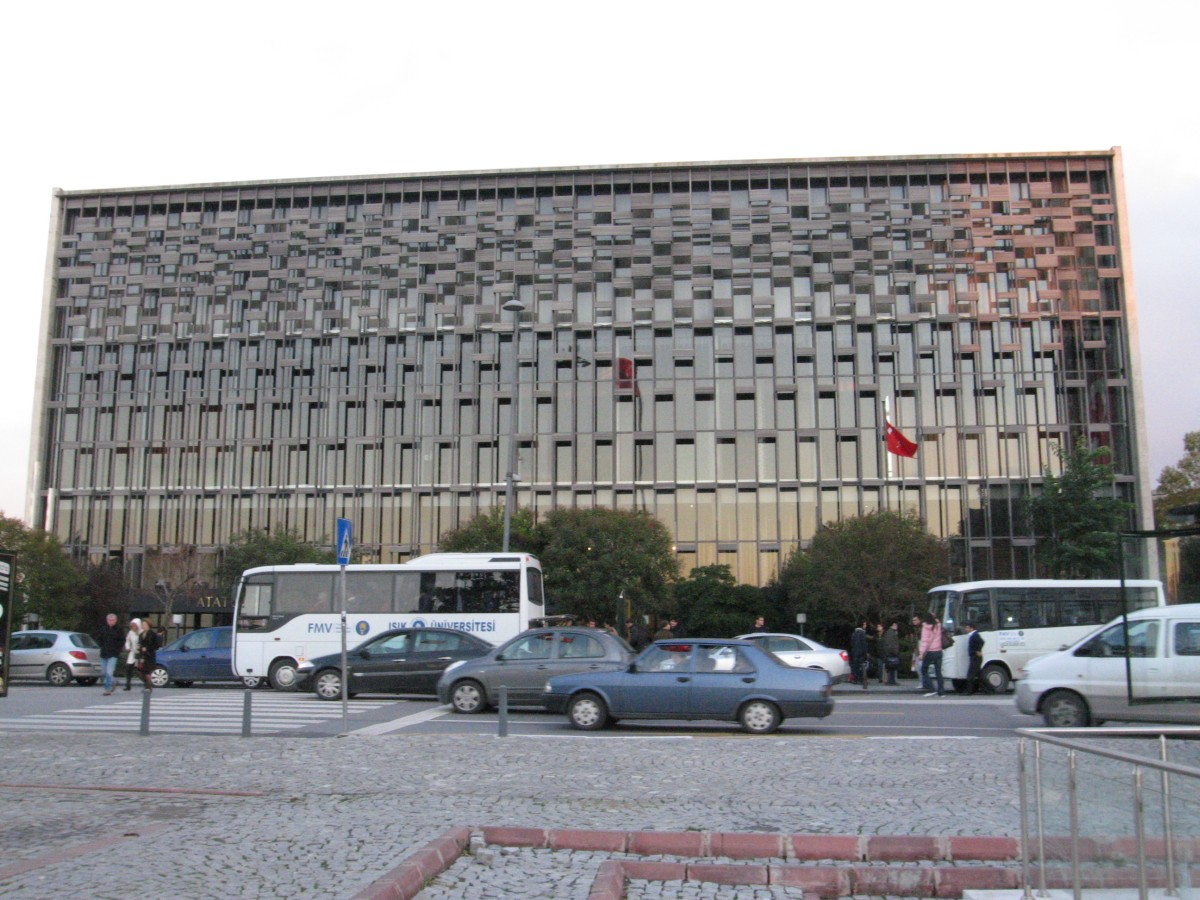
Atatürk Cultural Center (1969–1977) at Taksim Square is considered an important example of Turkish architecture from the 1960s.

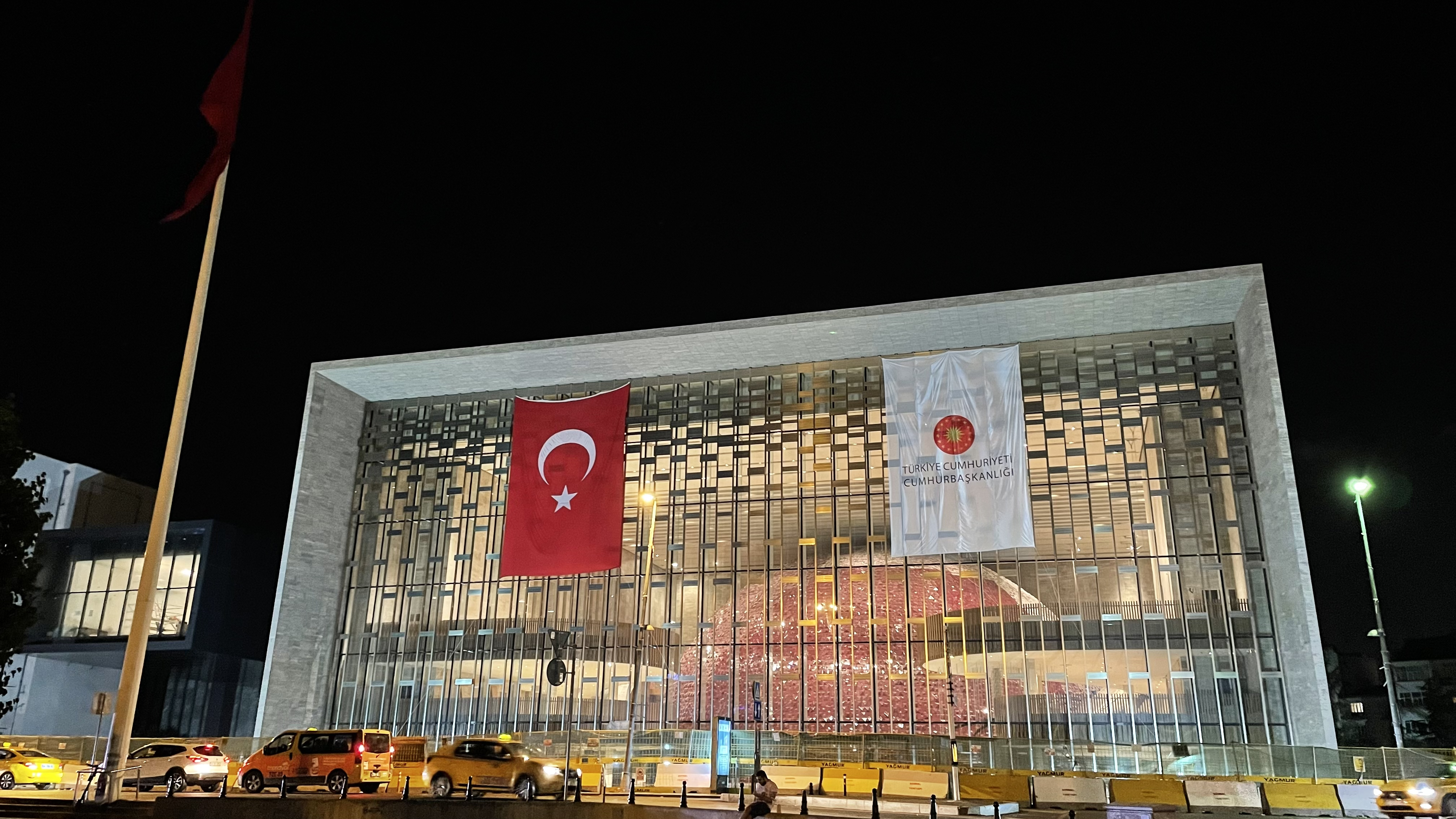
Renovation of AKM
