= Atatürk Cultural Center =

Architectural structure

Coordinates: 41°02′12″N 28°59′16″E

- Atatürk Kültür Merkezi
- AKM

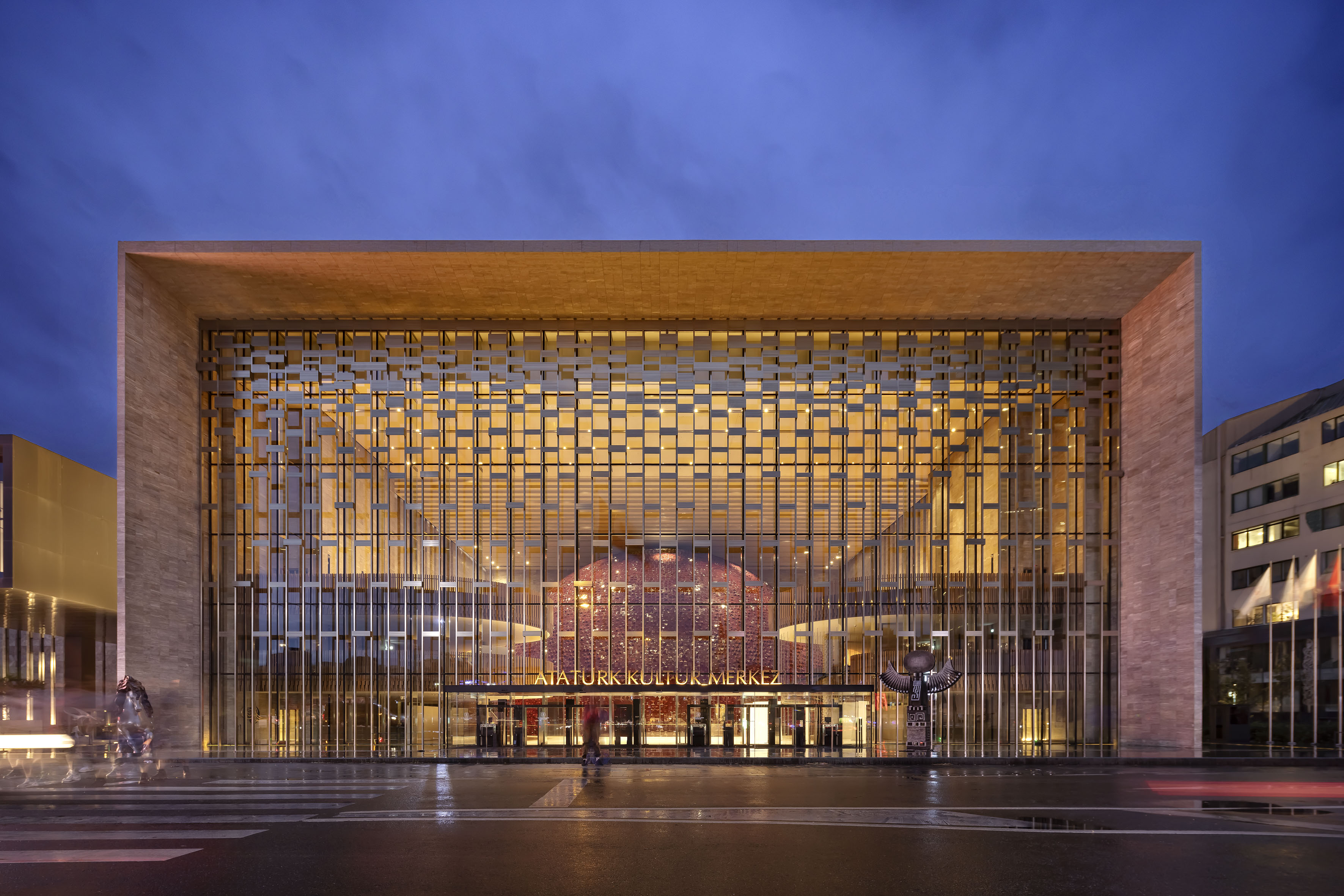
- Interactive map of Atatürk Cultural Center
- Location: Taksim, Istanbul, Turkey
- Owner: Turkish Ministry of Culture and Tourism
- Type: Cultural center

Construction
- Opened: April 12, 1969; 57 years ago
- Closed: 2008; 18 years ago
- Demolished: 2018; 8 years ago
- Rebuilt: 2021; 5 years ago
- Cost: 2 billion Turkish lira
- Architects: Hayati Tabanlıoğlu (Original); Murat Tabanlıoğlu (Current)

Website
- akmistanbul.gov.tr

The Atatürk Cultural Center (Turkish: Atatürk Kültür Merkezi), commonly called the AKM, is a concert hall, theatre and cultural centre running along the eastern side of Taksim Square in Beyoğlu, Istanbul. Originally opened on April 12, 1969, it was closed for renovation works in 2008, but was ultimately demolished in 2018 and rebuilt in 2021 as a state-of-the-art cultural complex. On October 29, 2021, it reopened to the public after a 13-year interval. The new AKM building was designed by Murat Tabanlıoğlu, the son of Hayati Tabanlıoğlu who had designed the original AKM building. Werner Sobek AG was responsible for the facade engineering, creating a transparent facade that opens the building to Taksim Square.

== History ==
Two Turkish architects, Feridun Kip and Rüknettin Güney, proposed the building of the center on May 29, 1946, and work started on it before funding was halted in 1953. In 1956, construction resumed under architect Hayati Tabanlıoğlu. The building, originally called the Istanbul Culture Palace, was completed in 13 years and opened on April 12, 1969, twenty-three years after the initial proposal.

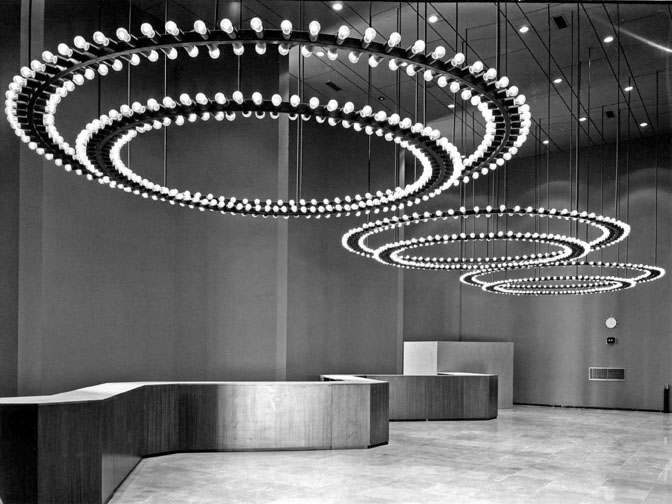
Original interior of the building, before the fire in 1970.

On November 27, 1970, fire broke out during a performance of Arthur Miller's play The Crucible (Turkish: Cadı Kazanı, "The Witch's Cauldron"). Although there was no loss of life, some items brought from Topkapı Palace for the play of Sultan Murad IV, including a caftan belonging to the Sultan, a painting of him, and a historic Koran were destroyed in the fire, the source of which was never identified.

By June 2008, the Cultural Center was closed for renovations. The Board for the Protection of Cultural Property decided on 31 December 2009 that it should be renovated on the original site and on 9 April 2012, a tender was held for the renovation contract. The re-opening was planned for 29 October 2013, Republic Day with an estimated budget of ₺70 million (approx. US$39 million). However, in May 2013 the project was halted. Reports suggested that the AKM was to be demolished as part of redevelopment plans for Taksim Square and Gezi Park and was to be replaced with a new opera house and a mosque.

During the Gezi Park protests, which began on 28 May 2013, many protesters climbed onto the roof of the AKM during the night. The roof was evacuated and the police occupied the empty building and turned it into a logistics center. By February 2015, it was clear that the building, which had been empty for seven years, had been plundered; its technical installations, lighting and audio equipment as well as many other objects were sold at second hand markets or junk shops, even though the building was supposedly under police protection.

== The old complex ==
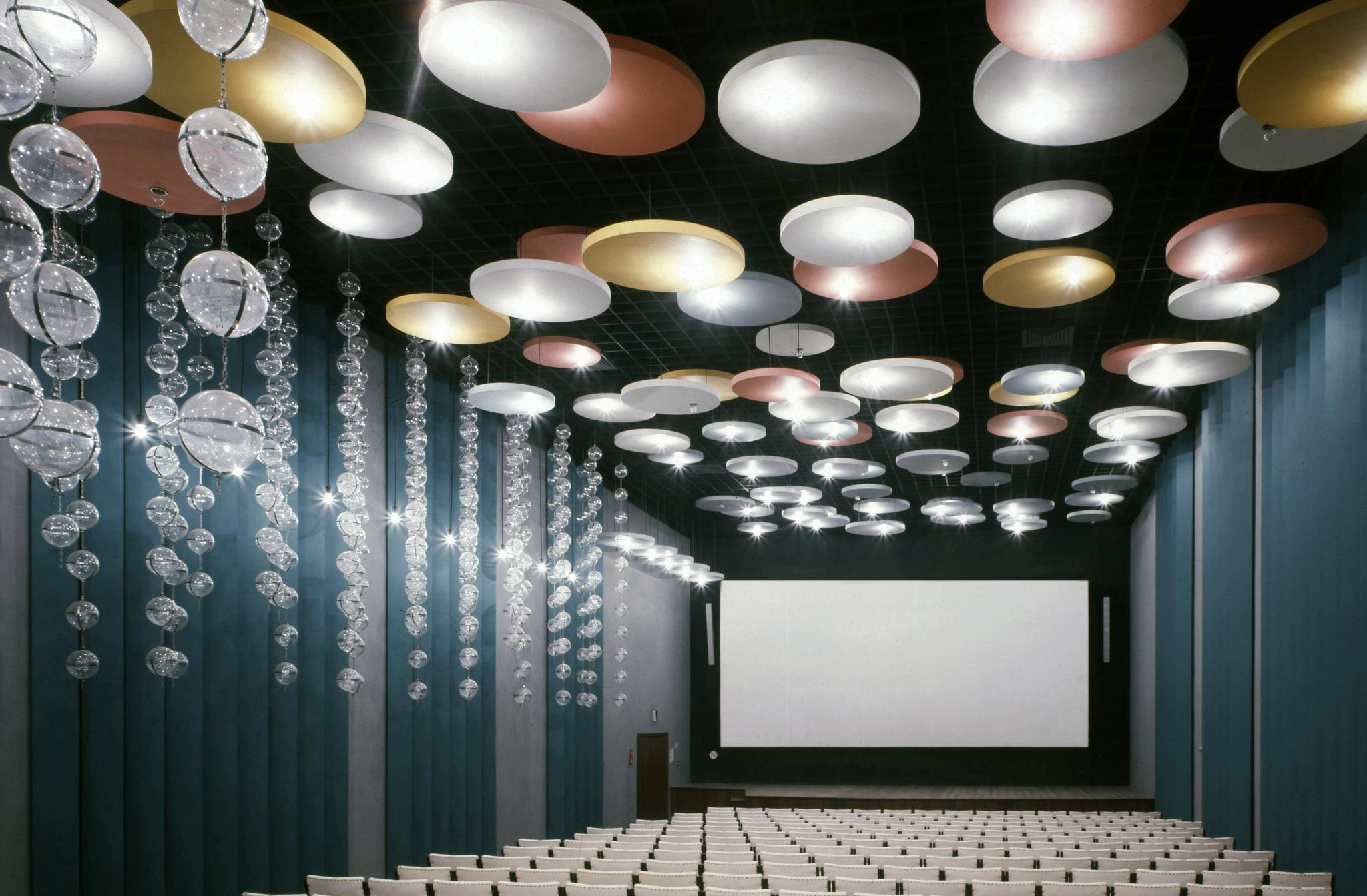
Original interior of the building, before the fire in 1970.

The original AKM building covered 31,702 m^{2} (341,240 sq ft) and had a floor plan area of 14,606 m^{2} (157,220 sq ft) with a usable area of 52,000 m^{2} (560,000 sq ft). The complex consisted of the Grand Stage, a hall with a 1,317 seat capacity hosting the Turkish State Theatres and performances of the Turkish State Opera and Ballet; and the Concert Hall, which had a seating capacity for 502 spectators and was used for concerts, meetings and conferences. There was also an exhibition hall of 1,200 m^{2} (13,000 sq ft) in the lobby, a Chamber Theatre with 296 seats, the Aziz Nesin Stage with 190 seats, and a cinema hall with 206 seats.

Until 2008, the center was home to the

- Istanbul State Symphony Orchestra and Choir (İstanbul Devlet Senfoni Orkestrası ve Korosu),
- Istanbul State Modern Folk Music Ensemble (İstanbul Devlet Modern Halk Müziği Topluluğu),
- Istanbul State Classical Turkish Music Choir (İstanbul Devlet Klasik Türk Müziği Korosu).

Over the summer, the AKM hosted the Istanbul Arts and Culture Festival.

== The new building ==
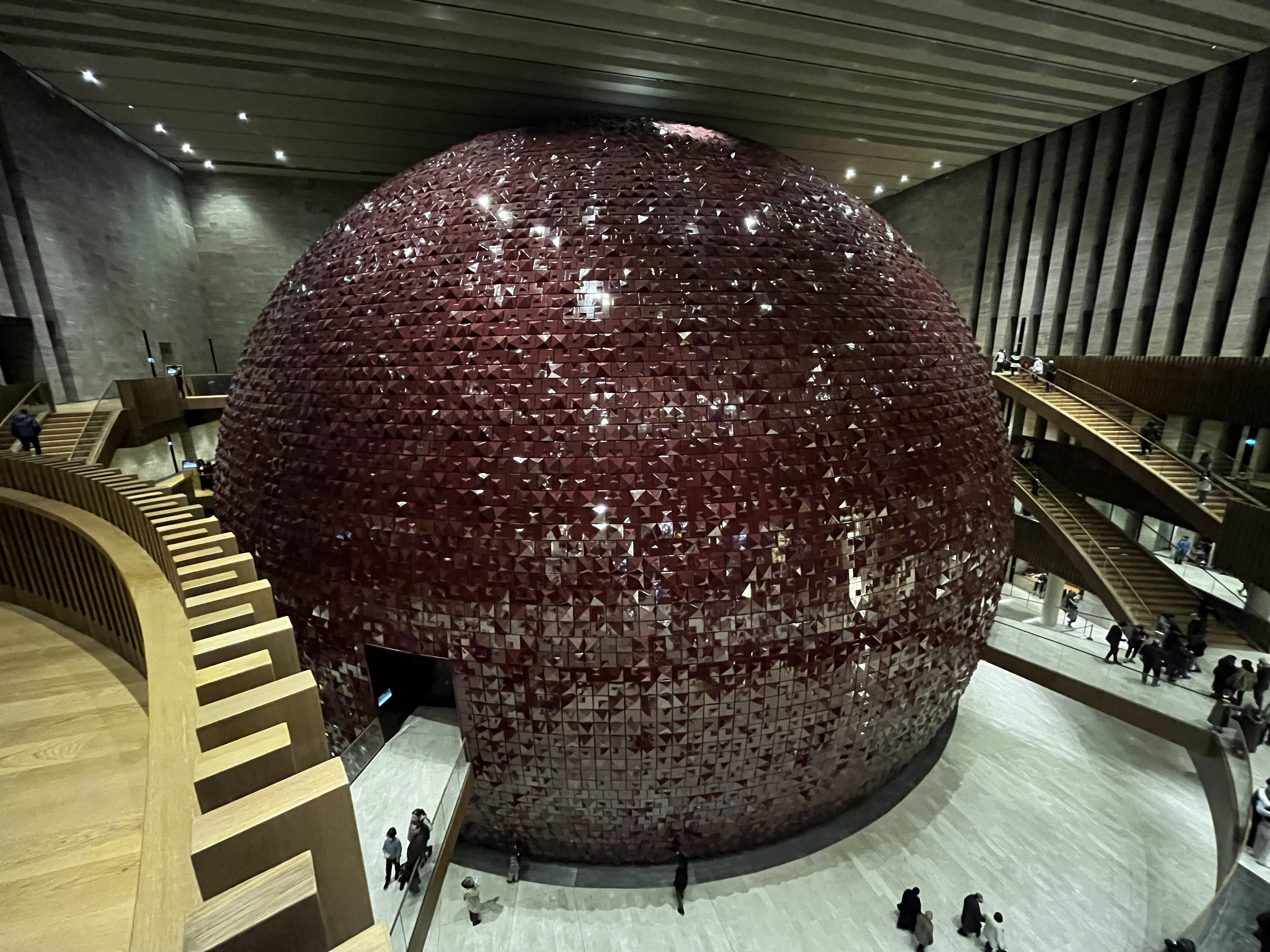
Entrance of the Opera Hall

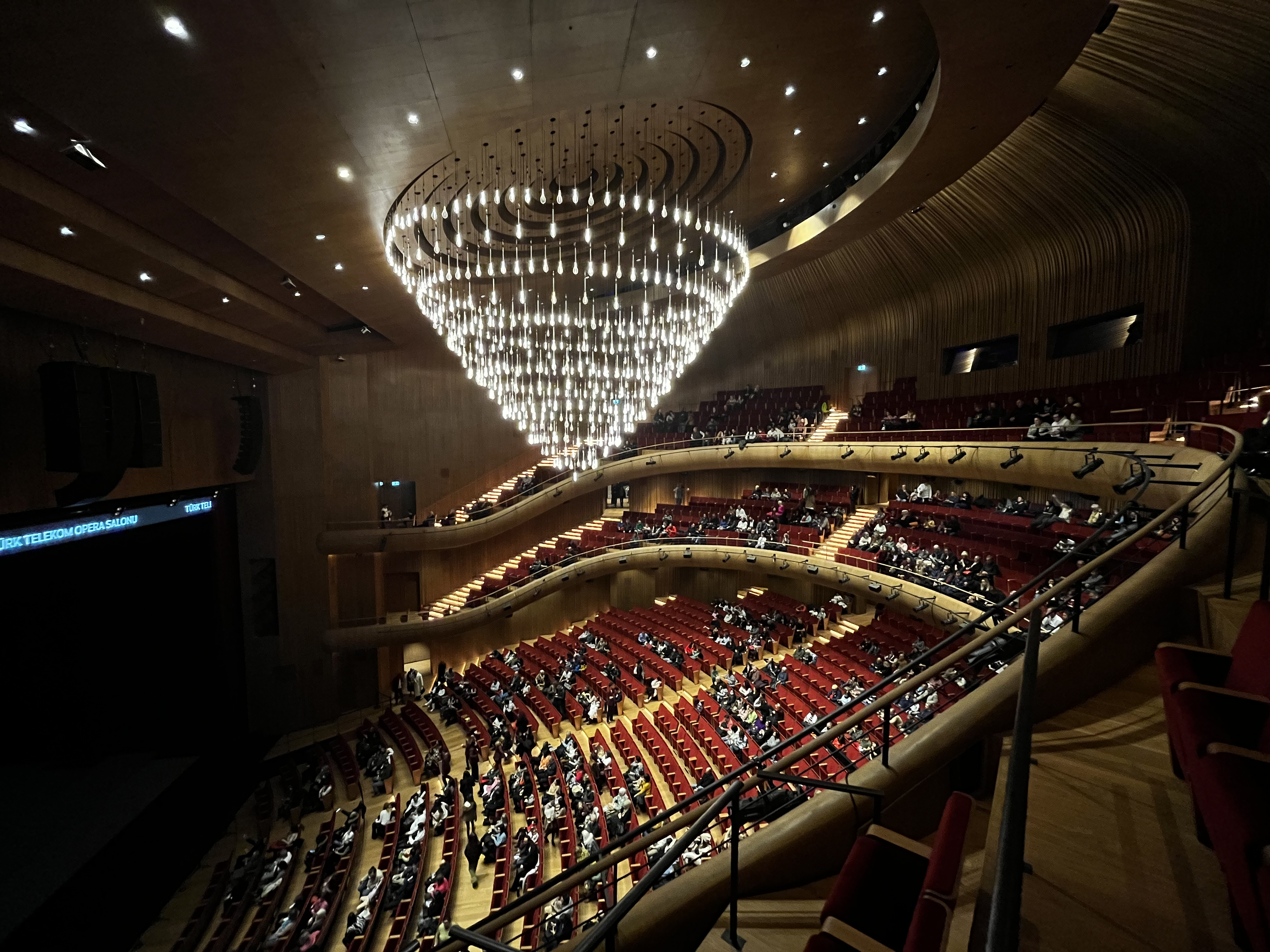
Interior of the Opera Hall

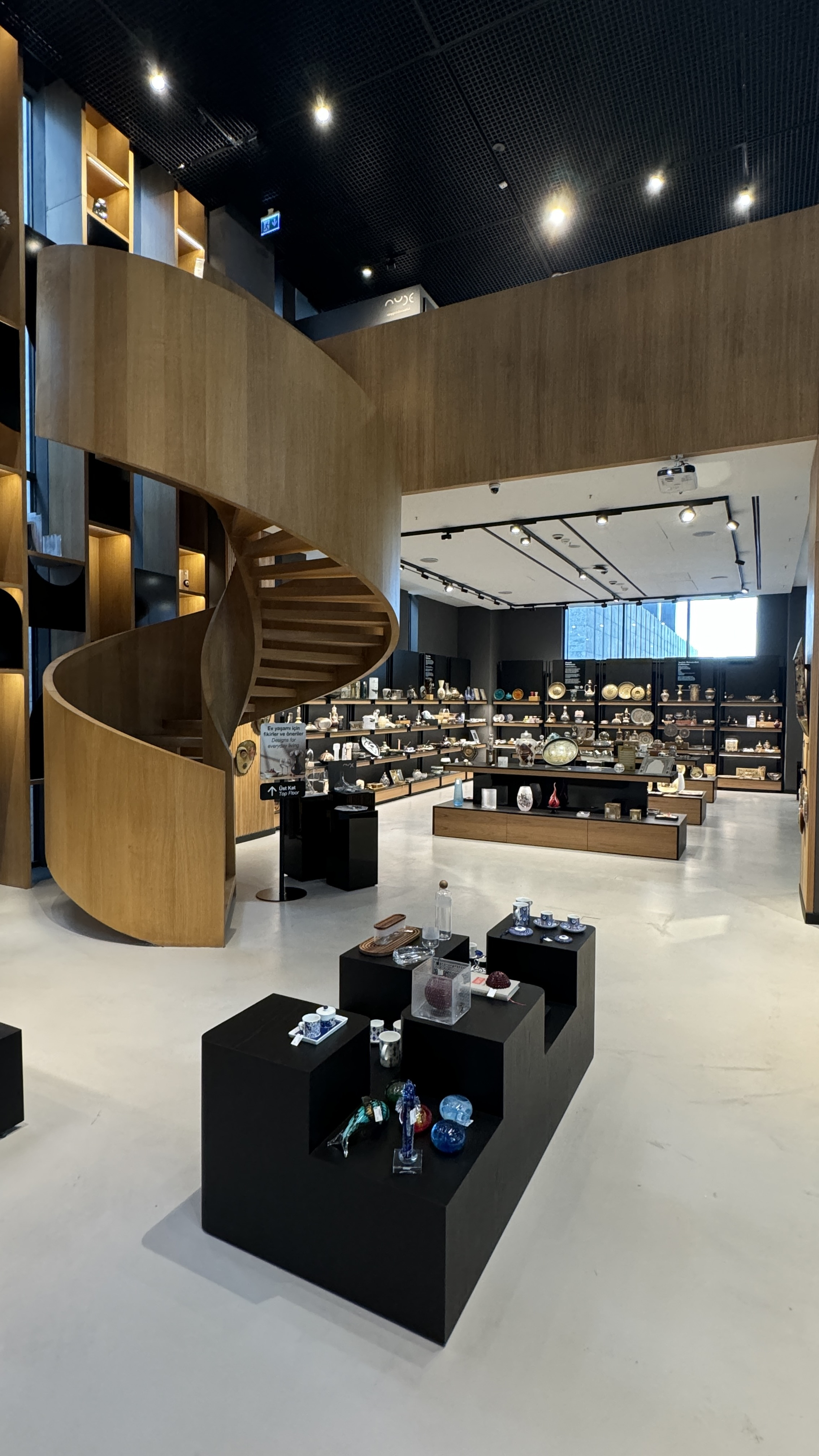
Paşabahçe Art Glass Store

After it had been empty for ten years since 2008, demolition works of the original AKM building began on 13 February 2018, for the purpose of rebuilding it. The demolition works were completed on 30 May 2018. On 10 February 2019, construction of the new complex began with a groundbreaking ceremony attended by President Recep Tayyip Erdoğan. The new Cultural Center consists of five sections, with a total area of 95,000 m^{2} (1,020,000 sq ft). It features a theatre, cinema, concert halls, an exhibition center, a convention hall, Vitali Hakko Creative Industries Library, a museum, an art gallery, a Paşabahçe art glass store, cafés, and restaurants. The new building was designed by Murat Tabanlıoğlu, the son of Hayati Tabanlıoğlu, who had designed the original AKM building. Construction works cost ₺850 million (approx. US$162 million).

== Gallery ==
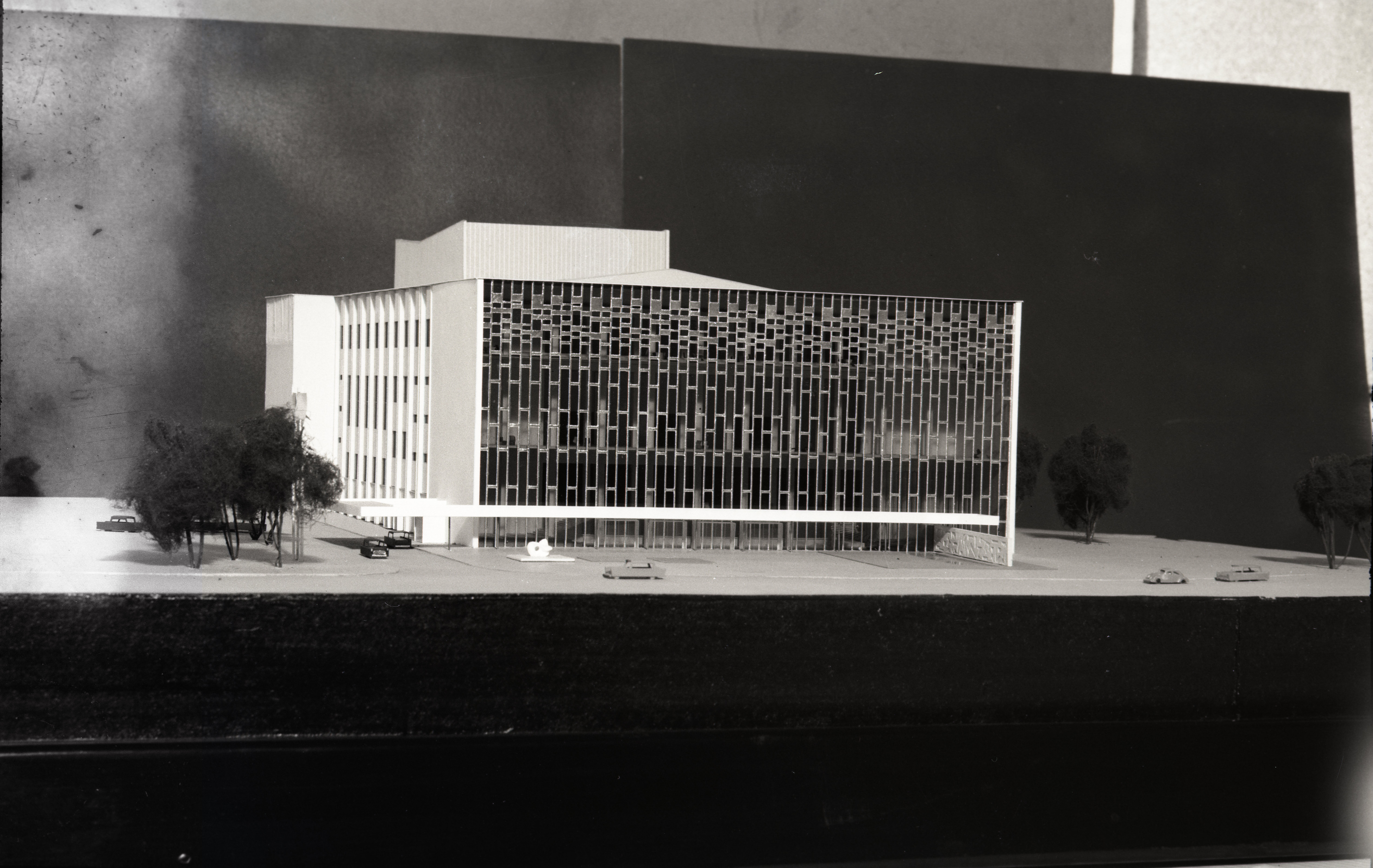

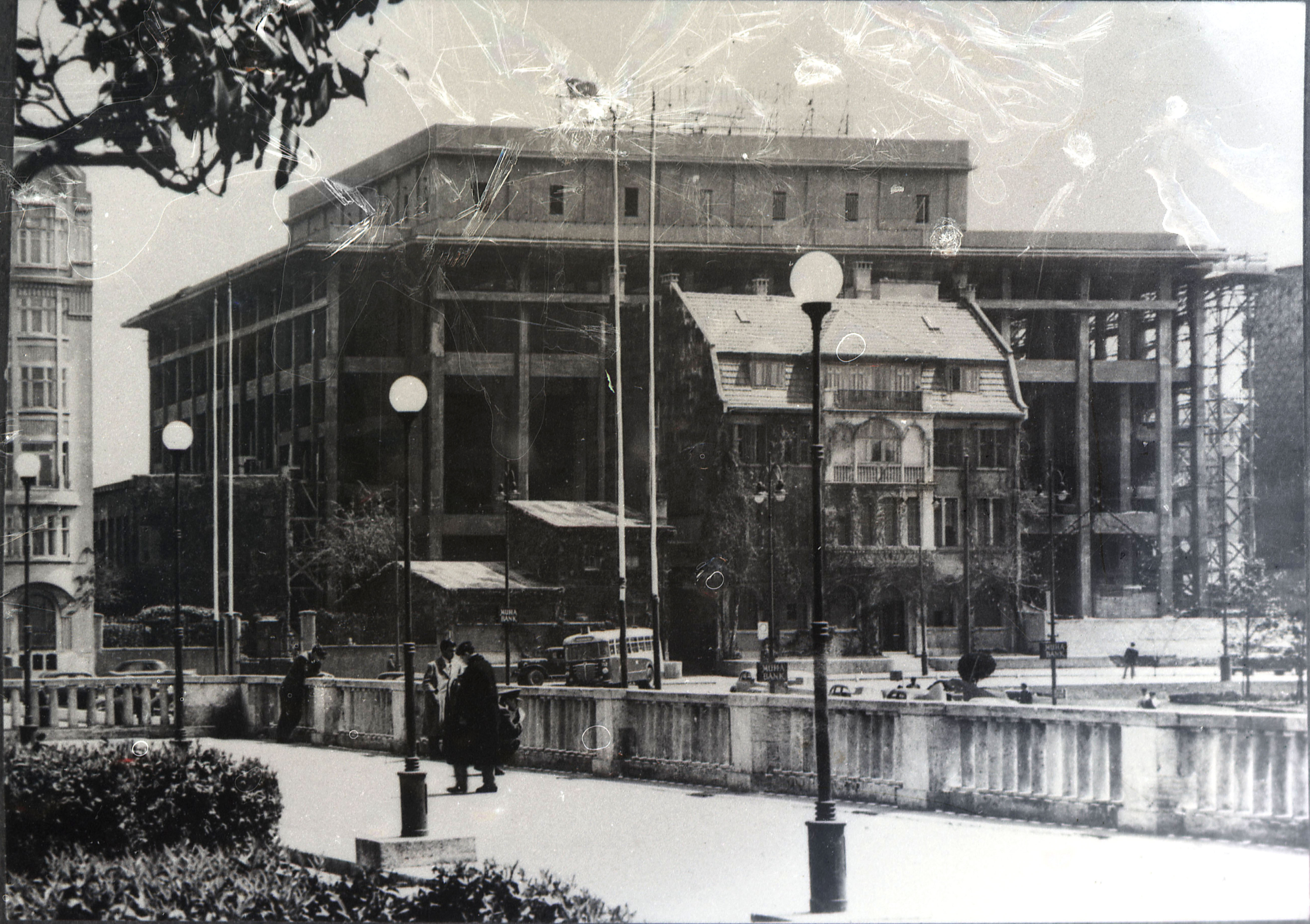

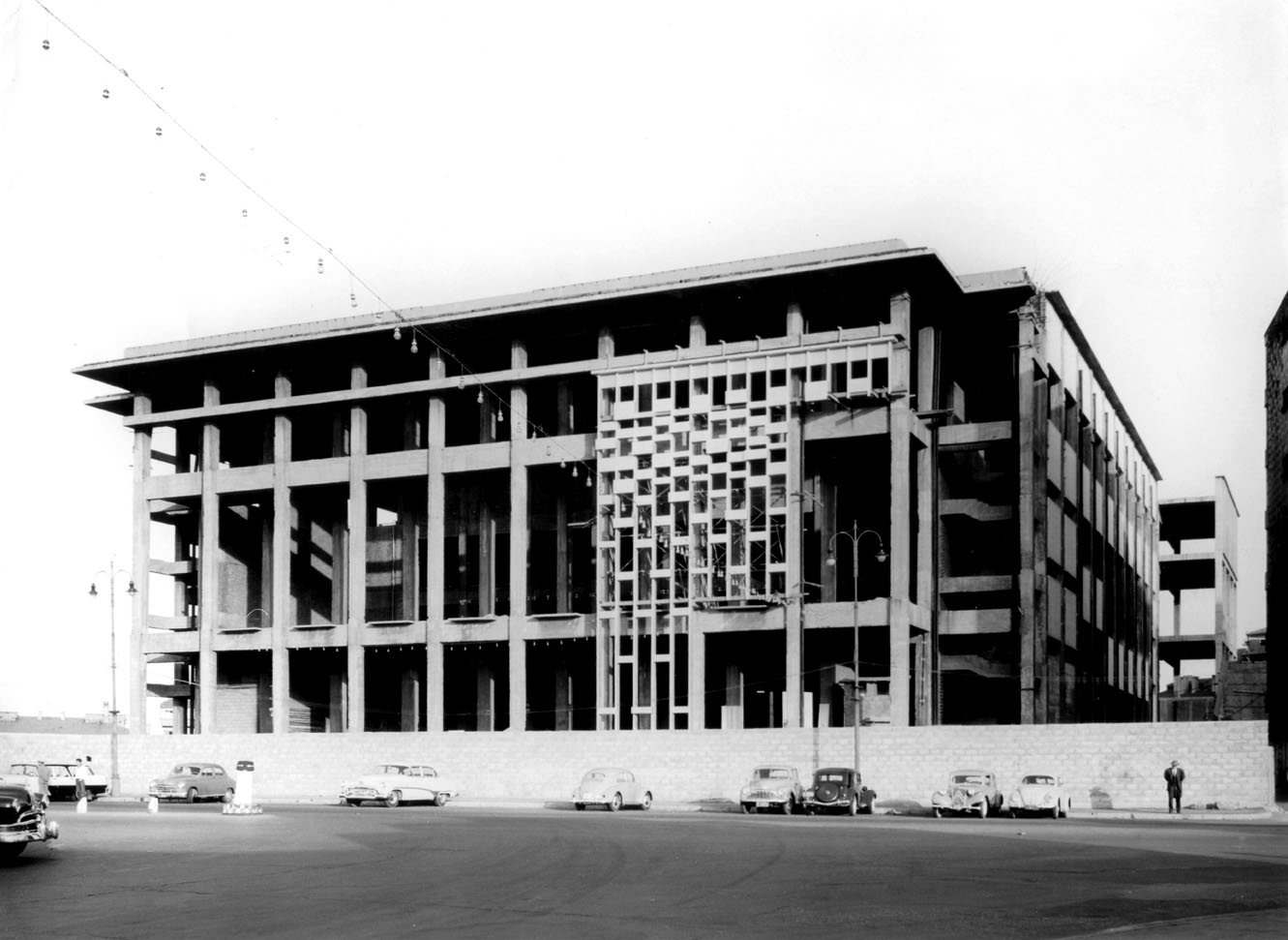

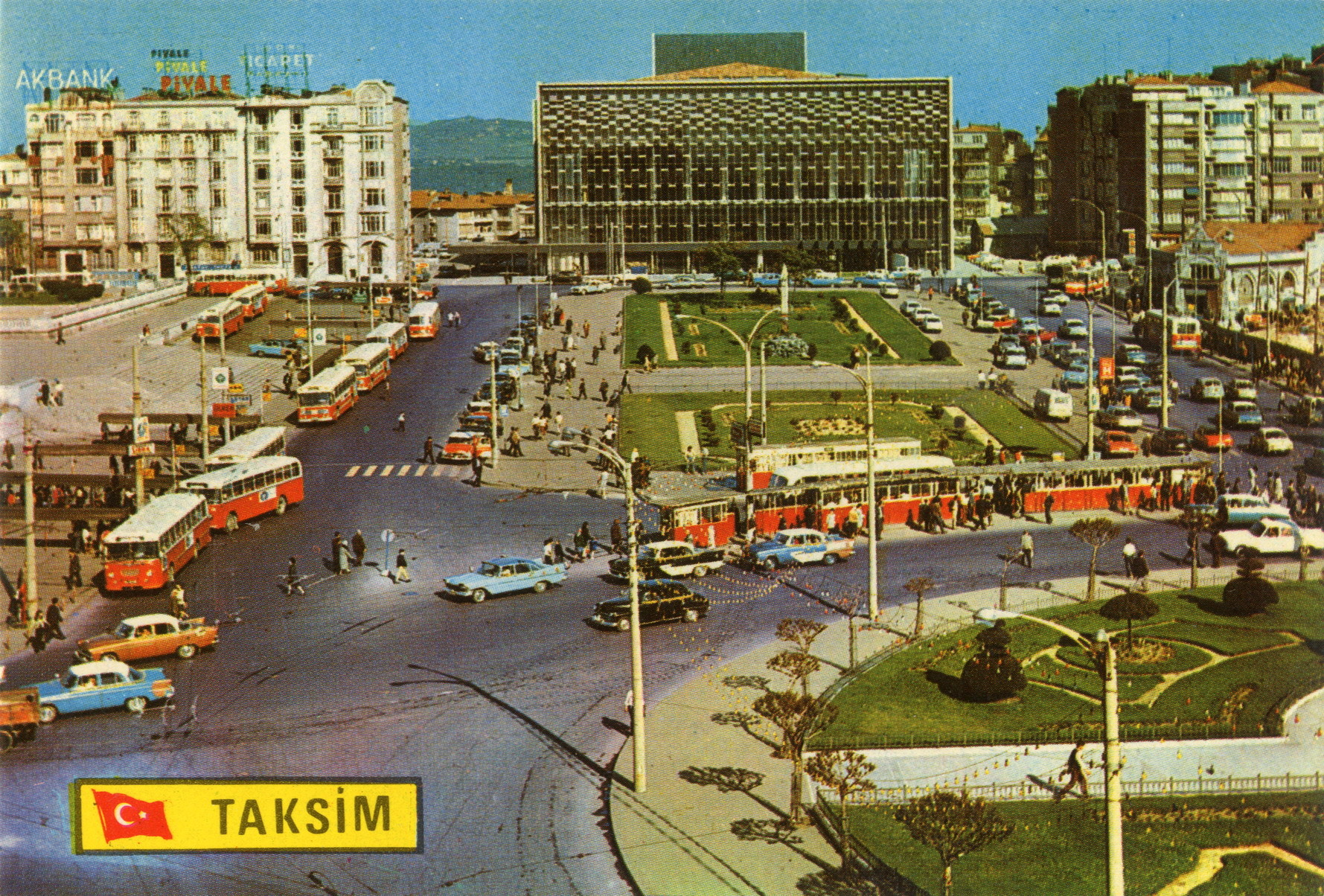

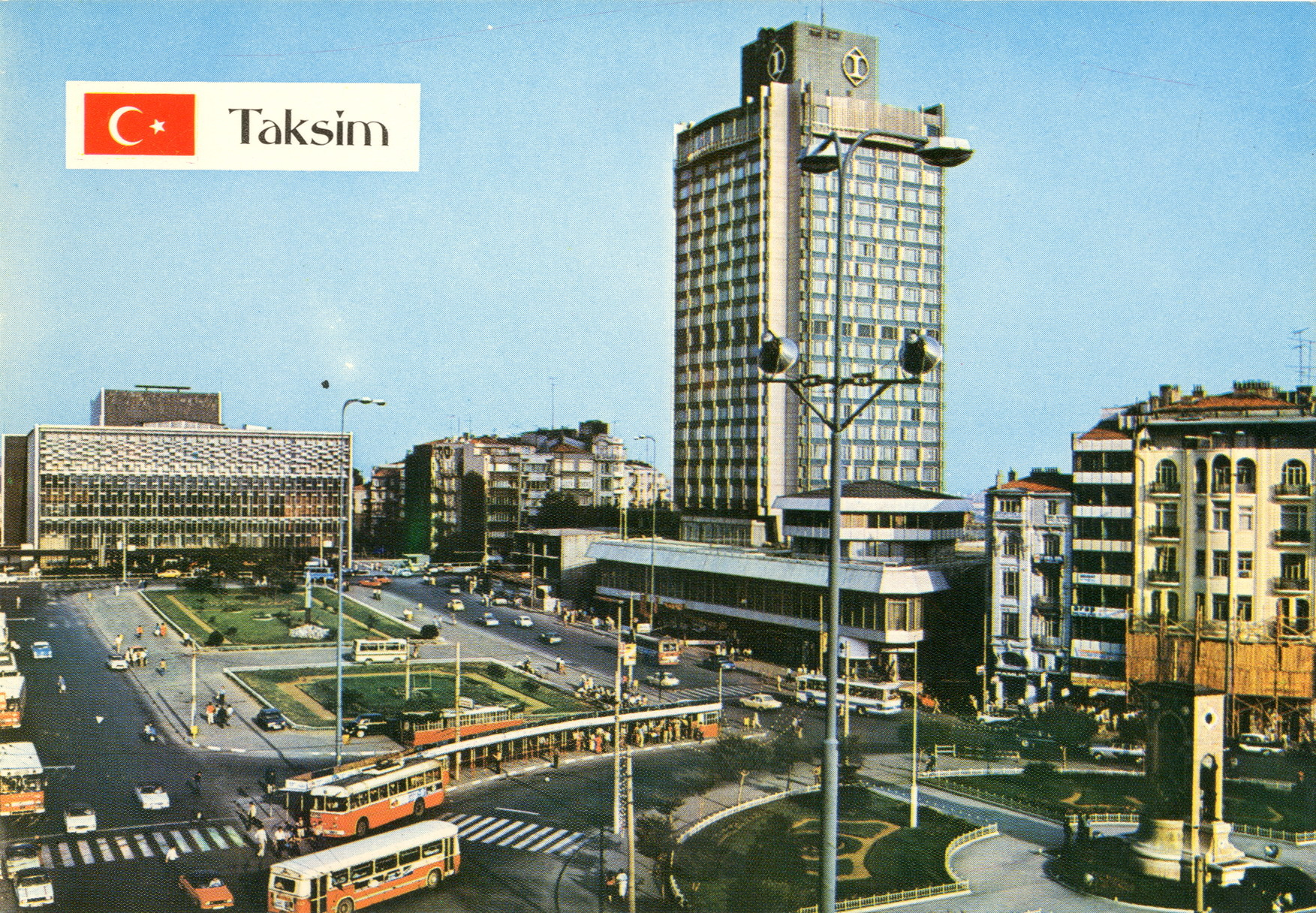

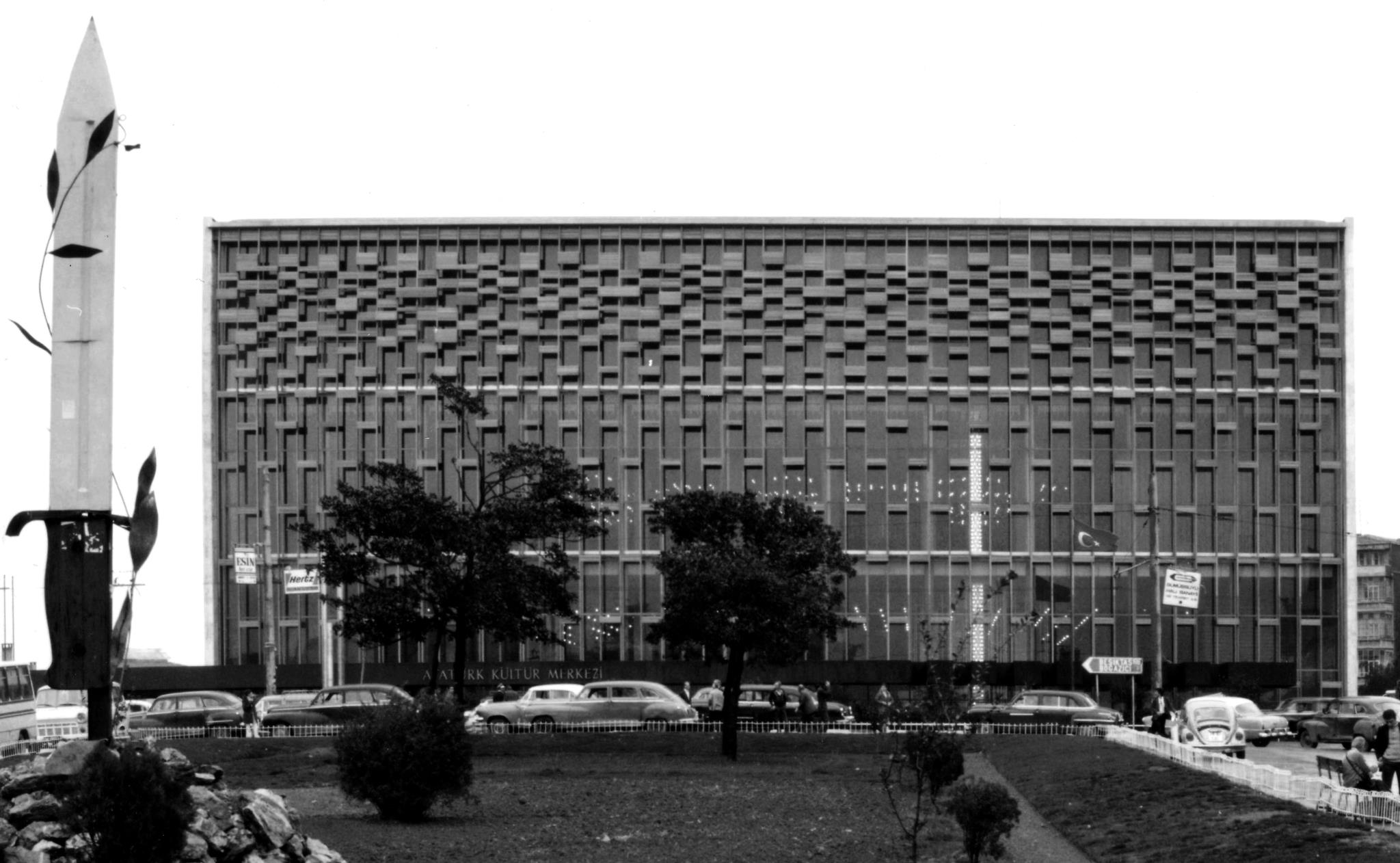

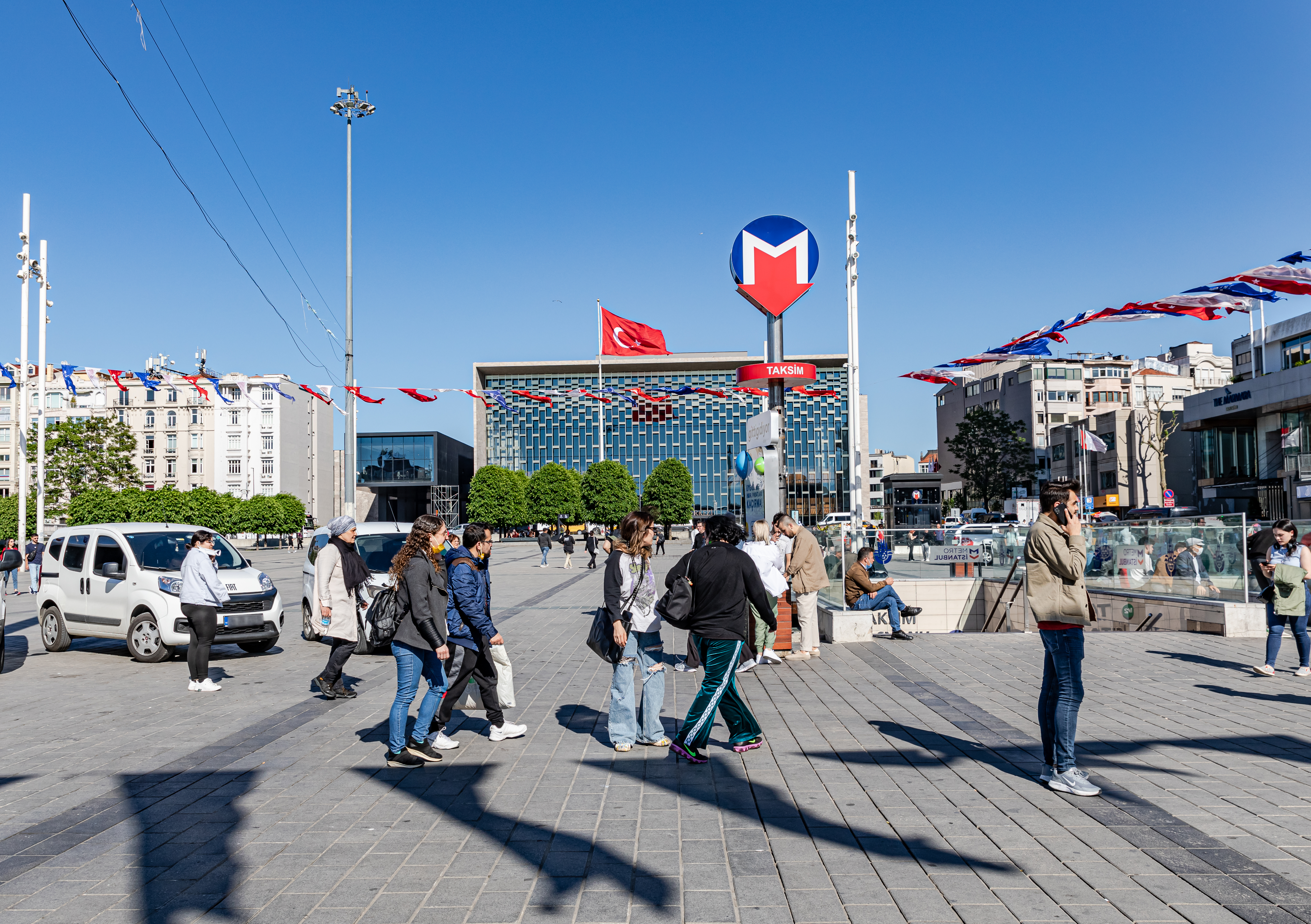

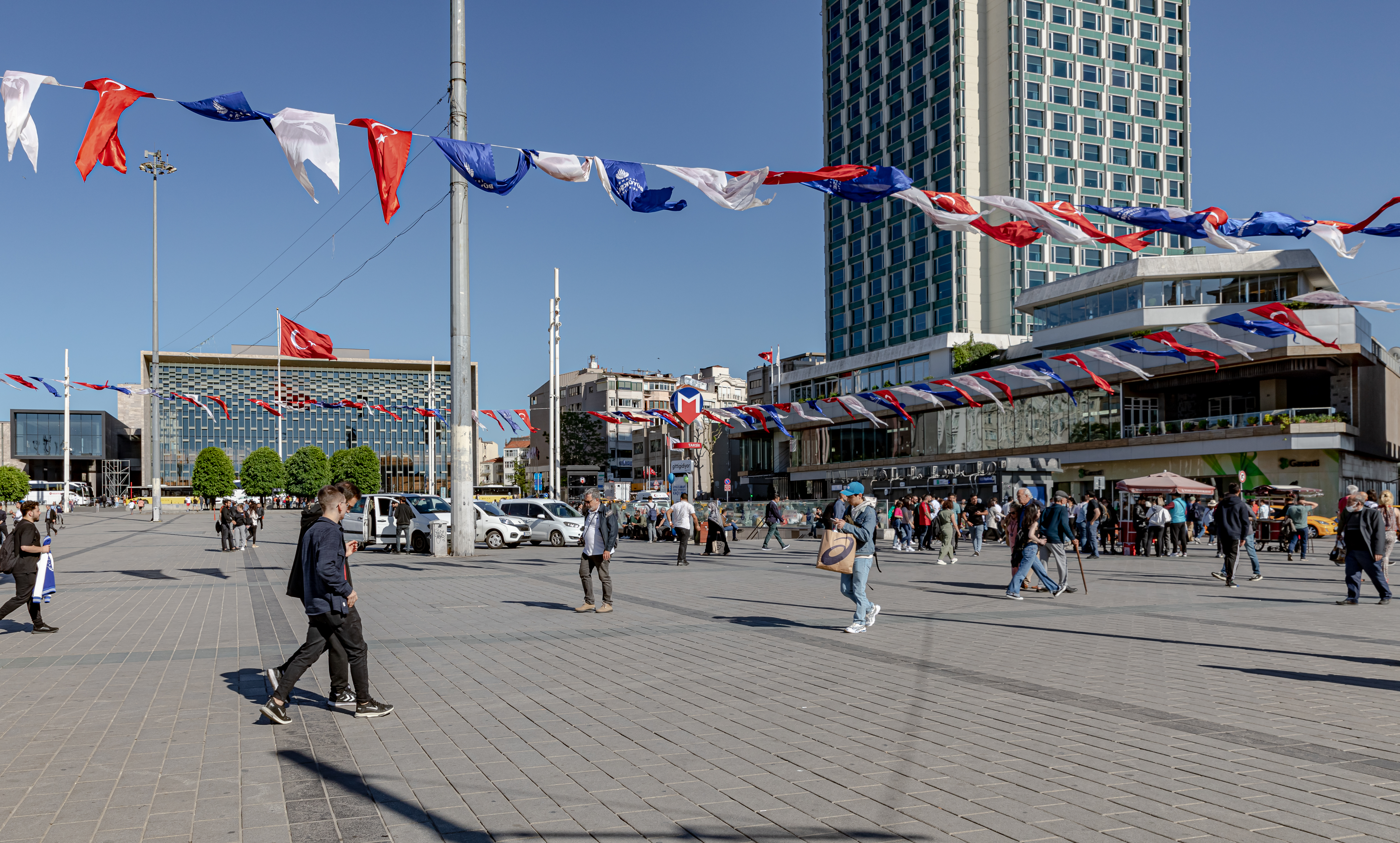

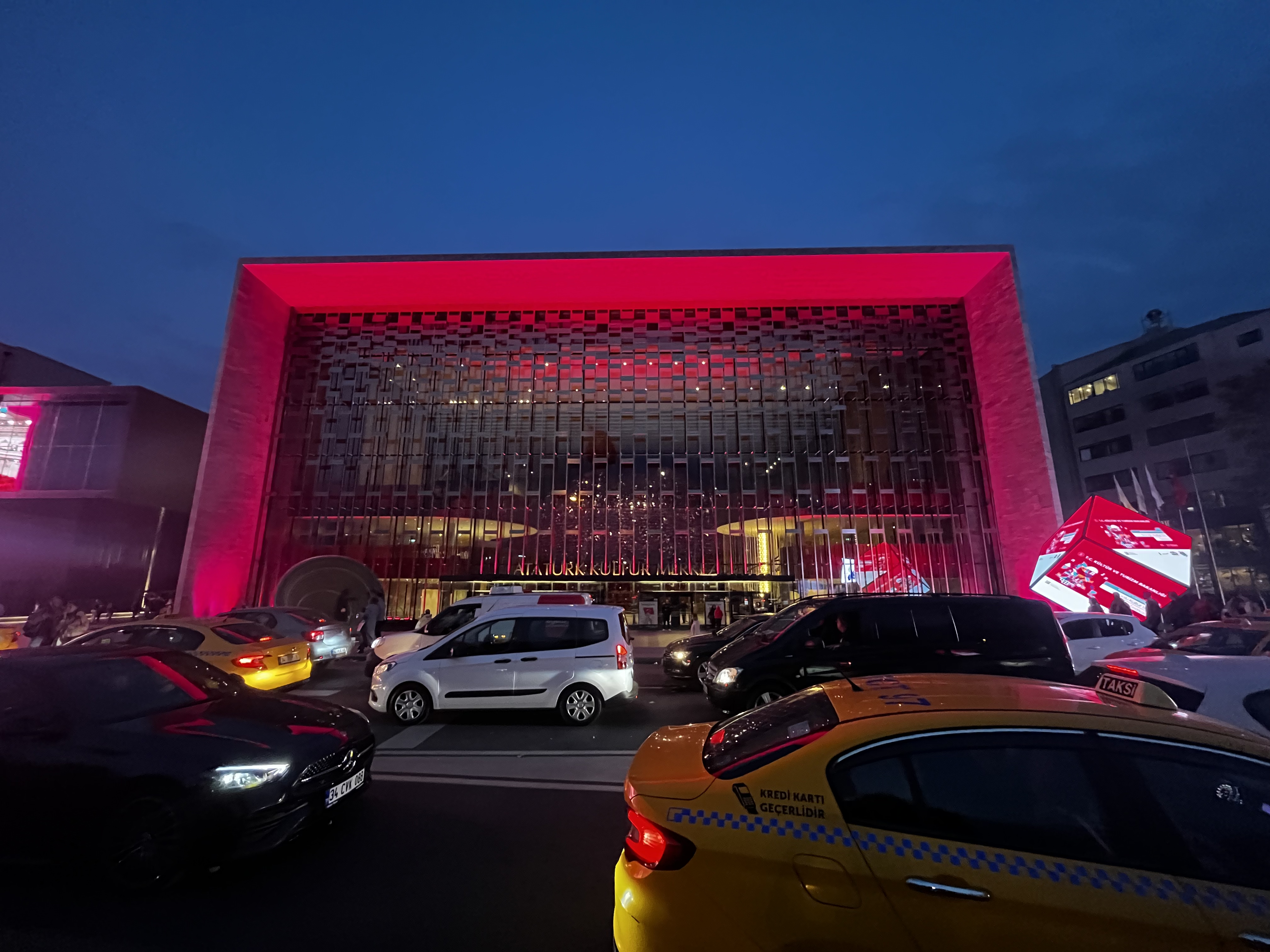

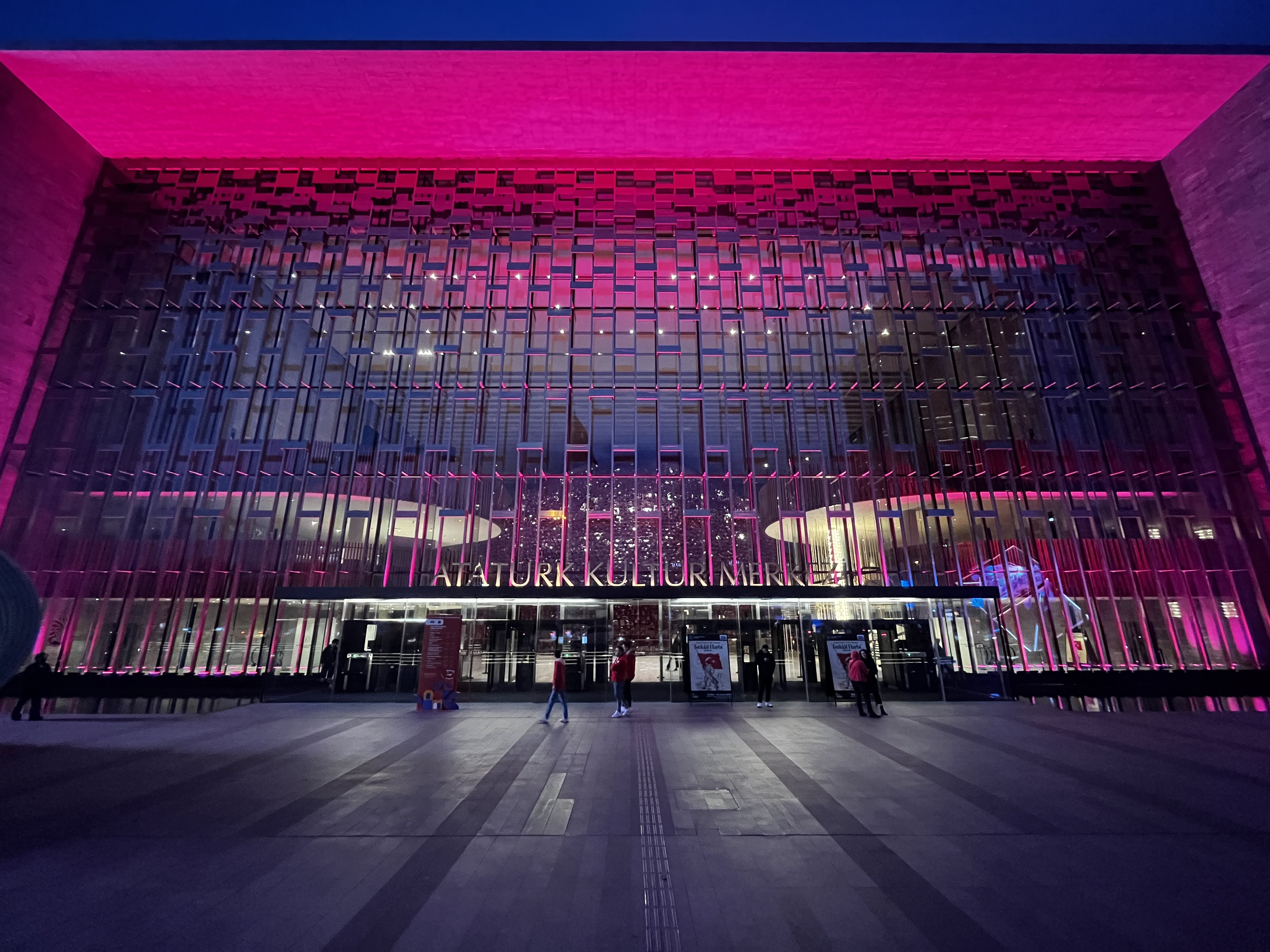

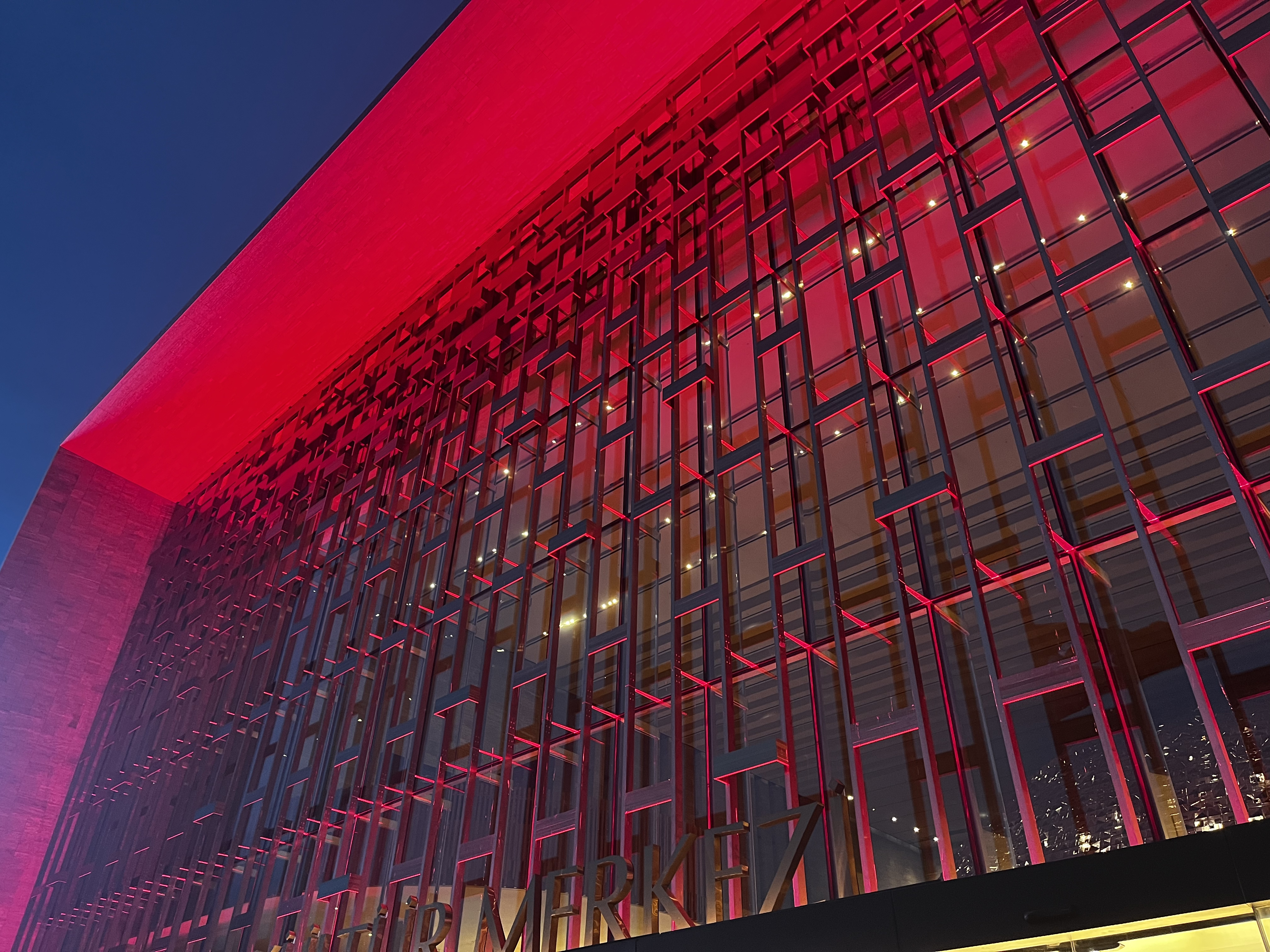

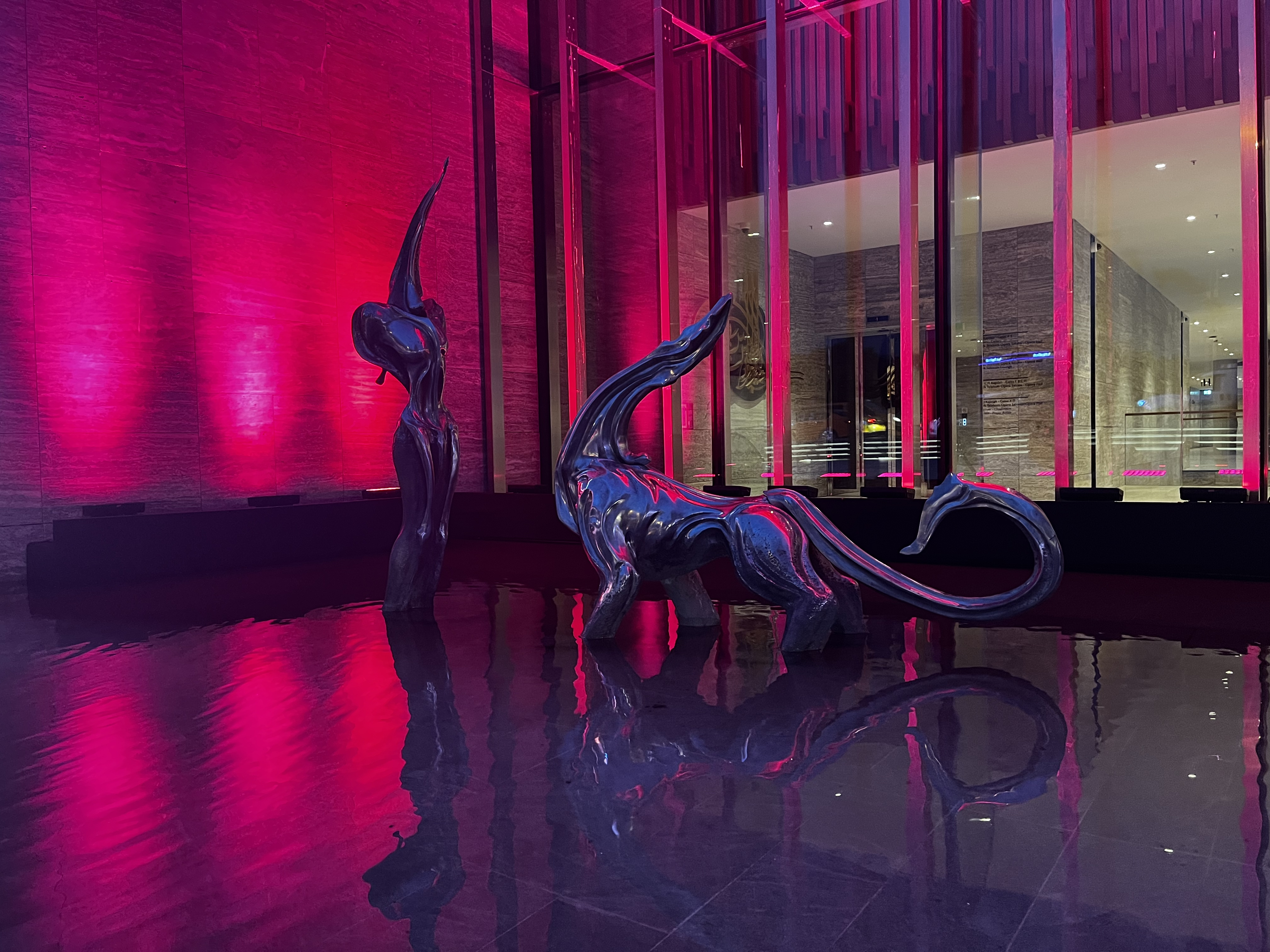

== See also ==
- Cemal Reşit Rey Concert Hall
- Süreyya Opera House
- Naum Theatre — Main opera house of Istanbul in the 19th century
- Zorlu Center PSM — Largest performing arts theatre and concert hall in Istanbul
- Kadıköy Haldun Taner Stage
- List of concert halls
- List of music venues
