= Eczacıbaşı (disambiguation) =

Eczacıbaşı is a Turkish family name, and it may refer to:

== People ==
- Bülent Eczacıbaşı (born 1949), Turkish businessman
- Faruk Eczacıbaşı (born 1954), Turkish businessman
- Füsun Eczacıbaşı, Turkish architect, spouse of Faruk Eczacıbaşı
- Nejat Eczacıbaşı (1913–1993), businessman and founder of Eczacıbaşı industrial group of companies
- Oya Eczacıbaşı (born 1959), Turkish curator, spouse of Bülent Eczacıbaşı
- Şakir Eczacıbaşı (1929–2010), Turkish pharmacist, and businessman

== Other uses ==
- Eczacıbaşı, Turkisj industrial group of companies
- Eczacıbaşı family, Turkish family in business
- Eczacıbaşı S.K., Turkish sports club
- Eczacıbaşı S.K. (men's basketball), Turkish defunct men's basketball team
- Eczacıbaşı Sports Hall, Ayazağa, abandoned sports hall in Istanbul, Turkey
- Eczacıbaşı Sports Hall, Kartal, sports hall in Istanbul, Turkey
- Eczacıbaşı Sports Hall, Levent, demolished sports hall in Istanbul, Turkey
- Eczacıbaşı Volleyball, Turkish women's volleyball team
