= Eczacıbaşı family =

Turkish business family

The Eczacıbaşı (Turkish pronunciation: [edʒzaːdʒɯbaˈʃɯ]) are a dynasty of Turkish businesspeople founded by Süleyman Ferit Eczacıbaşı, a self-made wealthy pharmacist. Third generation members of the family companies in Turkey established mostly by the efforts of his son Nejat Eczacıbaşı. After the death of the second generation members, the grandson of the founder, Bülent Eczacıbaşı and his brother Faruk Eczacıbaşı continued to run the Eczacıbaşı Holding and related companies.

- Süleyman Ferit Eczacıbaşı (1885 İzmir – April 18, 1973), married Saffet Hanım
  - Nejat Ferit Eczacıbaşı (January 5, 1913 İzmir – October 6, 1993 Philadelphia, USA), married Fatma Beyhan (née Ergene) (1923–2004)
    - Ferit Bülent Eczacıbaşı (1949 İstanbul), married Oya (née Esener) in 1980
      - Nejat Emre Eczacıbaşı (1984 İstanbul), married Dilara (née Öztemir) in 2019
        - Ela Defne Eczacıbaşı (2021 İstanbul)
      - Esra Eczacıbaşı (1989 İstanbul), married 2018 Murat Coşkun
        - Nejat Kaya Coşkun (2021 İstanbul)
    - Rahmi Faruk Eczacıbaşı (1954 İstanbul), married Füsun (née Alpsoy)
      - Sinan Eczacıbaşı (1991 İstanbul), married Emily Barber in 2023
      - Murat Eczacıbaşı
  - Vedat Eczacıbaşı (1916 İzmir – September 4, 1961 İstanbul), married Gülçin in 1953
    - Deniz (Eczacıbaşı) Alatlı (f)
      - Naz Alatlı (f)
    - Saffet Pınar Eczacıbaşı (f)
    - Refika Başkır (f) (extramarital)
  - Sedat Eczacıbaşı (1917 İzmir – ca. 1950)
  - Kemal Eczacıbaşı (1918 İzmir – March 4, 1996 İzmir), married Zerrin
    - Saima Filiz (Eczacıbaşı) Sarper (f)
      - Ferit Sarper
      - Selin Sarper
  - Haluk Eczacıbaşı (1921 İzmir – May 6, 1996), married Türkan
    - Nükhet Eczacıbaşı (f)
      - Ali Atalık
  - Melih Eczacıbaşı (1923 İzmir – September 22, 2004 İstanbul), married Melek Nazan (née Altan),
    - Füsun Eczacıbaşı Güran (f)
      - Simla Guran (f)
    - Renin Ayşe Saffet Eczacıbaşı (f)
      - Engin Egemen
        - Zuzanna Nazan Egemen (f)
        - Atilla Osman Egemen
        - Lara Egemen (f)
      - Melih Egemen
  - Şakir Eczacıbaşı (1929 İzmir – January 23, 2010 İstanbul), married Saniha Sebla

Legend

- f: female

== See also ==
- Eczacıbaşı Holding
- Eczacıbaşı Volleyball
- İstanbul Foundation for Culture and Arts
- İstanbul Modern
