= Füsun =

Füsun is a Turkish feminine given name, and it may refer to:

- Füsun Eczacıbaşı, Turkish supporter of contemporary art
- Füsun Köksal (born 1973), Turkish composer of contemporary classical music
- Füsun Onur (born 1938), Turkish artist
- Füsun Önal (born 1947), Turkish pop music singer, theater actress and writer
- Füsun Sayek (1947–2006), Turkish ophthalmologist
