= Yahşi Baraz =

Turkish art dealer

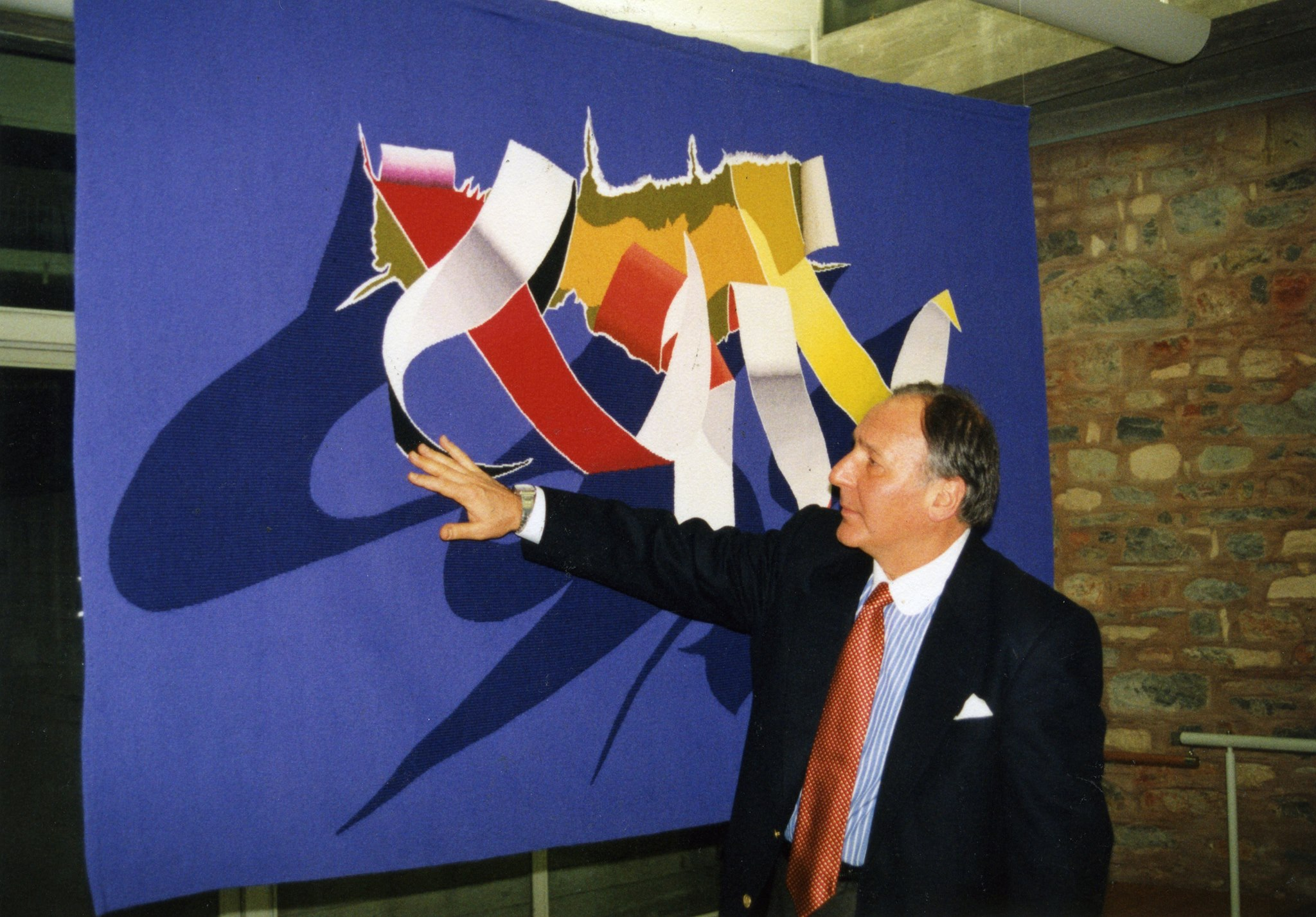
- Yahşi Baraz in front of a Burhan Doğançay painting, 1996.
- Born: Yahşi Baraz; April 19, 1944 (age 81); Istanbul, Turkey
- Occupation: Art Dealer

Yahşi Baraz (born April 19, 1944) is a Turkish art dealer. He is the founder and the director of one of Turkey's earliest art galleries, Galeri Baraz.

== Early life and career ==
Yahşi Baraz was born in Istanbul, Turkey. He is the son of Ahmet Münir Baraz and Ülker Baraz. His great grandfather is Zeki Pasha, a field marshal of the Ottoman Army during the Turkish Balkan Wars and World War I.

He studied ceramics at the State Academy of Fine Arts in Istanbul, currently known as Mimar Sinan Fine Arts University, and graduated with a B.A. in 1969. His teachers included prominent Turkish artists and historians such as Sabri Berkel, Edip Hakkı Köseoğlu, Belkıs Mutlu, Nejat Diyarbekirli, İsmail Hakkı Oygar and Sadi Diren. He traveled in Europe - hitchhiking - during his summer vacations in his Academy years.

He did his mandatory military service in Southeastern Turkey, on the Syrian border as a gendarmerie. Upon being discharged from the military he built a ceramics workshop in Kurtuluş, İstanbul, at the current gallery building and used it as his studio between 1971 and 1976.

In 1974 he went to New York City where he first worked at "Fire House Ceramics" and later at "Unicorn Gallery" in SoHo as an intern. That was where he realised that he wanted to be an art dealer instead of an artist.

After returning to Turkey in 1975, he set out to convert the ceramics workshop into an art gallery. Galeri Baraz opened on November 14, 1975 with a show of Can Göknil's paintings and Yahşi Baraz's ceramic works.

Since then the gallery held more than two hundred and fifty exhibitions of important Turkish artists such as Burhan Doğançay, Mehmet Güleryüz, Nuri İyem, Edip Hakkı Köseoğlu, Fikret Mualla, Bedri Baykam, Princess Fahrelnissa Zeid, Nejad Melih Devrim, Güngör Taner and Ömer Uluç. He also introduced Peter Halley, Hunt Slonem, John F. Simon JR. and Mark Kostabi to the Turkish art world.

Yahşi Baraz has played a significant role in promoting Turkish art and artists and has been very influential in getting people to form art collections since the 70s. His clients included Feyyaz Berker, Erol Aksoy, Ali Koçman, Aykut Hamzagil, Mustafa Taviloğlu, Halil Bezmen, Şakir Eczacıbaşı, Bülent Eczacıbaşı, Cengiz Çetindoğan, Barbaros-Sema Çağa and many others.

In 2010, he founded Galeri Baraz Publishing House. The company has published 7 books about arts in Turkish with the last one being a biography of Fahrelnissa Zeid.

== Personal life ==
Yahşi Baraz married Hülya Salihoğlu in 1983. He has a daughter named Rüya Baraz from this first marriage. In October 2004 he married Bulgarian sculptor Maria Kılıçlıoğlu.

== Awards ==
- 2022 - Bahçeşehir University, World Art Day Awards
- 2018 - International Association of Art, World Art Day "2018 Art Person of the Year Honor Award"
- 2006 - Sanat Akmerkez'de, "Art Contributors" Award
- 1998 - TÜYAP, Plaque of Appreciation for 20 Years of Service in the Art World
