= Şakir Eczacıbaşı =

Turkish pharmacist, businessman (1929–2010)

- Born: 3 December 1929; İzmir, Turkey
- Died: 24 January 2010 (aged 80); Istanbul, Turkey
- Resting place: Zincirlikuyu Cemetery
- Education: Robert College; School of Pharmacy, University of London (BPharm)
- Occupations: Pharmacist; photographer; businessman
- Organization: Eczacıbaşı Holding
- Spouse: Saniha Sebla (married 1962)
- Parents: Süleyman Ferit Eczacıbaşı (father); Saffet Hanım (mother)
- Relatives: Nejat (1913–1993) (brother); Vedat (1916–1961) (brother); Sedat (1917–1950) (brother); Kemal (1918–1996) (brother); Haluk (1921–1996) (brother); Melih (1923–2004) (brother)
- Awards: Chevaliers of the Ordre des Arts et des Lettres; State Medal of Distinguished Service

Şakir Eczacıbaşı (3 December 1929 – 24 January 2010), a second generation member of the Turkish Eczacıbaşı family, was a pharmacist, photographer and businessman.

He was awarded the Chevaliers of the Ordre des Arts et des Lettres of France and the State Medal of Distinguished Service of Turkey. Şakir Eczacıbaşı served as the chairman of the board of directors of the Istanbul Foundation for Culture and Arts (IKSV) succeeding his brother Nejat in this post.

== Biography ==
He was born 1929 in İzmir, Turkey to Süleyman Ferit (1885–1973) and his wife Saffet Hanım as their last of seven sons, Nejat (1913–1993), Vedat (1916–1961), Sedat (1917–ca. 1950), Kemal (1918–1996), Haluk (1921–1996) and Melih (1923–2004).

He received a degree from the School of Pharmacy, University of London after he finished Robert College in Istanbul.

Following his return home, he worked as a journalist and published two magazines, "Sanat Yaprağı" (English: Art leaf) and "Tıpta Yenilikler" (English: Novelties in Medicine). He was responsible for the production of a series of presentation films about his family's company Eczacıbaşı. "Renk Duvarları" (English: Walls of color), a documentary film he produced in 1964 was honored with Council of Europe's "Cultural Films Awards". Şakir Eczacıbaşı was co-founder of the Turkish Cinemateque Association and its chairman for ten years long.

He served in the 1970s as the director general of Eczacıbaşı Pharmacy Co. In 1980, he was appointed CEO of the Eczacıbaşı Holding. After the death of his brother Nejat in 1993, he became the president of the Holding company. Finally, he resigned from active business career in 1996.

Eczacıbaşı was a photograph artist. He exhibited his works at 13 shows in Turkey and in 23 personal events abroad. He collected some of his photographs in the albums "Anılar/Moments" (English: Memories/Moments), "Türkiye Renkleri" (English: Colors of Turkey), "Kapılar Pencereler" (English: Doors Windows). He edited and contributed with his photographs to the calendars Eczacıbaşı company published since 1960.

He died on 24 January 2010 in Istanbul and was laid to rest at the Zincirlikuyu Cemetery. Şakir Eczacıbaşı was succeeded by his wife Saniha Sebla, he had married 48 years before.

== Works ==
=== Magazines ===
- "Sanat Yaprağı" (Art leaf) – Supplement of newspaper Vatan, 1950s
- "Tıpta Yenilikler" – (Novelties in Medicine) 1950s
- "Yeni Sinema" – (1966–1970) Official periodical of the Turkish Cinemateque Association

=== Photography albums ===
- "İstanbul" – 1965
- "Anadolu" – 1968
- "Evler" – 1969
- "Anıtlar" – 1970
- "Sular" – 1971
- "Sokaklar" – 1972
- "Kıyılar" – 1973
- "Satıcılar" – 1974
- "Çocuklar" – 1975
- "Kırlar" – 1976
- "Taşıtlar" – 1977
- "Köprüler" – 1978
- "Sanatlar" – 1979
- "Kapılar" – 1980
- "Tekneler" – 1981
- "Pencereler" – 1982
- "Çarşılar" – 1983
- "Köşkler" – 1984
- "Camiler" – 1985
- "Arabalar" – 1986
- "Göller" – 1987
- "Taşlar" – 1988
- "Ağaçlar" – 1989
- "Yollar" – 1990
- "Kişiler" - 1991
- "Seçmeler" - 1992
- "Oyunlar" - 1993
- "Tapınaklar" - 1994
- "Kahveler" - 1995
- "Çeşmeler" - 1996
- "Duvarlar" - 1997
- "Seçmeler 2" - 1998
- "Merdivenler" - 1999
- "Türkiye Uygarlıkları" - 2000
- "Dükkanlar" - 2001
- "Balıkçılar" - 2002
- "Evler" - 2003
- "Yollar Sokaklar" - 2004
- "Çarşılar Pazarlar" - 2005
- "Kahvehaneler" - 2006
- "Oyuncular" - 2007
- "Yolcular" - 2008
- "Türkiye Renkleri: Colours of Turkey" – 1997 – (ISBN 975-7028-03-7)
- "1999 Merdivenler: Stairs and Ladders" – 1999
- "Balıkçılar: The Fisherman"
- "Evler: Houses" – 2003
- "Yollar, Sokaklar" – 2004
- "Çarşılar... Pazarlar... Marketplaces... Bazaars..." – 2005 – (ISBN 975-95037-9-4)
- "Kahvehaneler: Coffee Houses" – 2006 – (ISBN 975-95037-3-5)
- "Kapılar Pencereler: Doors Windows"
- "Anlar/Moments"
- "Sokaklardan"
- "Yolcular: Travellers" – 2008 – (ISBN 978-975-95037-3-4)
- "Üç Fotoğrafçıdan Sanatçı Portreleri: Three Fotographers Artist Portraits" Ara Güler ve Jerry Schatzberg'le birlikte
- "Türkiye: Bir Portre – Turkey a Portrait (By Eighteen)" – 1993
- "İstanbul Görüntüleri" – 1995
- "Türkiye Uygarlıkları: Civilizations of Turkey" – 2000
- "Türkiye'den İnsan Manzaraları Human Landscapes From Turkey" – 2002 – (ISBN 978-975-95037-2-7)
- "Türk Fotoğrafçıları Kütüphanesi 12" – 2005
- "İstanbul, İstanbul" – 2009

=== Exhibition albums ===
- "Şakir Eczacıbaşı" – 1990
- "Şakir Eczacıbaşı" – 1996
- "Bir Seçki 1965–2005"

=== Encyclopedias ===
- "Eczacıbaşı Sanat Ansiklopedisi" (3 volumes) – 1998 – (ISBN 9944-75-709-8)

=== Memories ===
- Çağrışımlar, Tanıklıklar, Dostluklar, Remzi Kitabevi, 2010.

=== Translation ===
- "Oyuncular: Players" – 2007 – (ISBN 978-975-95037-3-4)
- "Bernard Shaw: Gülen Düşünceler" – 1995 – Translation from George Bernard Shaw (ISBN 978-975-14-0726-9)
- "Oscar Wilde Tutkular, Acılar, Gülümseyen Deyişler" – 2004 – Translation from Oscar Wilde (ISBN 975-14-0815-6)

== Awards ==
- Turkish State Medal of Distinguished Service
