= Vitra =

Vitra can refer to:

- Vitra (furniture): a Swiss (originally German) manufacturer of designer furniture
  - Vitra Design Museum
- VitrA (sanitaryware): a Turkish sanitaryware, bathroom furniture, brassware and ceramic tiles company
