= VitrA (sanitaryware) =

Turkish company

Vitra
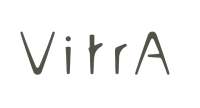
- Type: Private
- Traded as: BİST: ECYAP
- Founded: 1942; 84 years ago
- Founder: Nejat Eczacıbaşı
- Headquarters: Istanbul, Turkey
- Area served: Turkey, India, United Kingdom, Germany, Russia, France and Italy
- Products: Sanitaryware and bathroom furniture
- Website: www.vitra.com.tr

VitrA is a Turkish manufacturer of sanitaryware, bathroom furniture, brassware and ceramic tiles. It is part of the Eczacıbaşı Group, a multinational corporation involved in building materials and consumer products.

== History ==
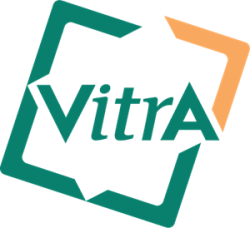
Former VitrA logo used from 2002 to 2006

=== 1942–1999 ===
VitrA was founded in 1942 by Nejat Eczacıbaşı, the same year its first factory was built in Kartal, Turkey.

After the World War II, the company started growing rapidly. Its core products at the time were ceramic plumbing fixtures. This represented an innovation in the Turkish market, dominated by marble. The ceramic novelty brought to an immediate success, so much so that in 1958 the company changed sectors from tile manufacturing to sanitaryware to meet the increasing demand.

In 1966, the VitrA brand name was adopted. In 1977 production was started in Bozüyük, in 1979 an armature factory, in 1991 a bathroom furniture factory, and in 1992 a ceramic factory was built.

The early 1980s saw the company begin to export its products, initially to Germany, where it opened its first foreign branch. In 1999 VitrA acquired a tile factory in Ireland, 5 years after the acquisition of the tile factory a new one was built.

=== 2000s–present ===
In 2002, Vitra changed its logo after 11 years, to try to make the company a world brand. In 2006, the company changed its logo again; the new logo was introduced at the UNICERA Ceramic and Bathroom Fair in Istanbul.

In 2011, VitrA started its production branch in Russia by building a factory in Serpukhov, Moscow, which cost about 30 million Euros. In 2019, the company opened its first branch in Italy.

In March 2020, the company won the 2020 iF Design Award in the awards' 66th year. In 2021, VitrA was awarded the TPM Excellence Award by the Japanese Institute of Plant Maintenance (JIPM).

Ferit Erin, who joined the Eczacıbaşı Group in 2009, started as the general manager of Vitra on 1 July 2018.

== Sponsorships ==
From 2010 to 2021, Vitra sponsored the Turkish women's volleyball team Eczacıbaşı. Vitra is also the sponsor of the International Hotel Awards for the Asia Pacific region and the Istanbul Festival of Architecture.
