= Burhan Doğançay =

Turkish-American artist (1929–2013)

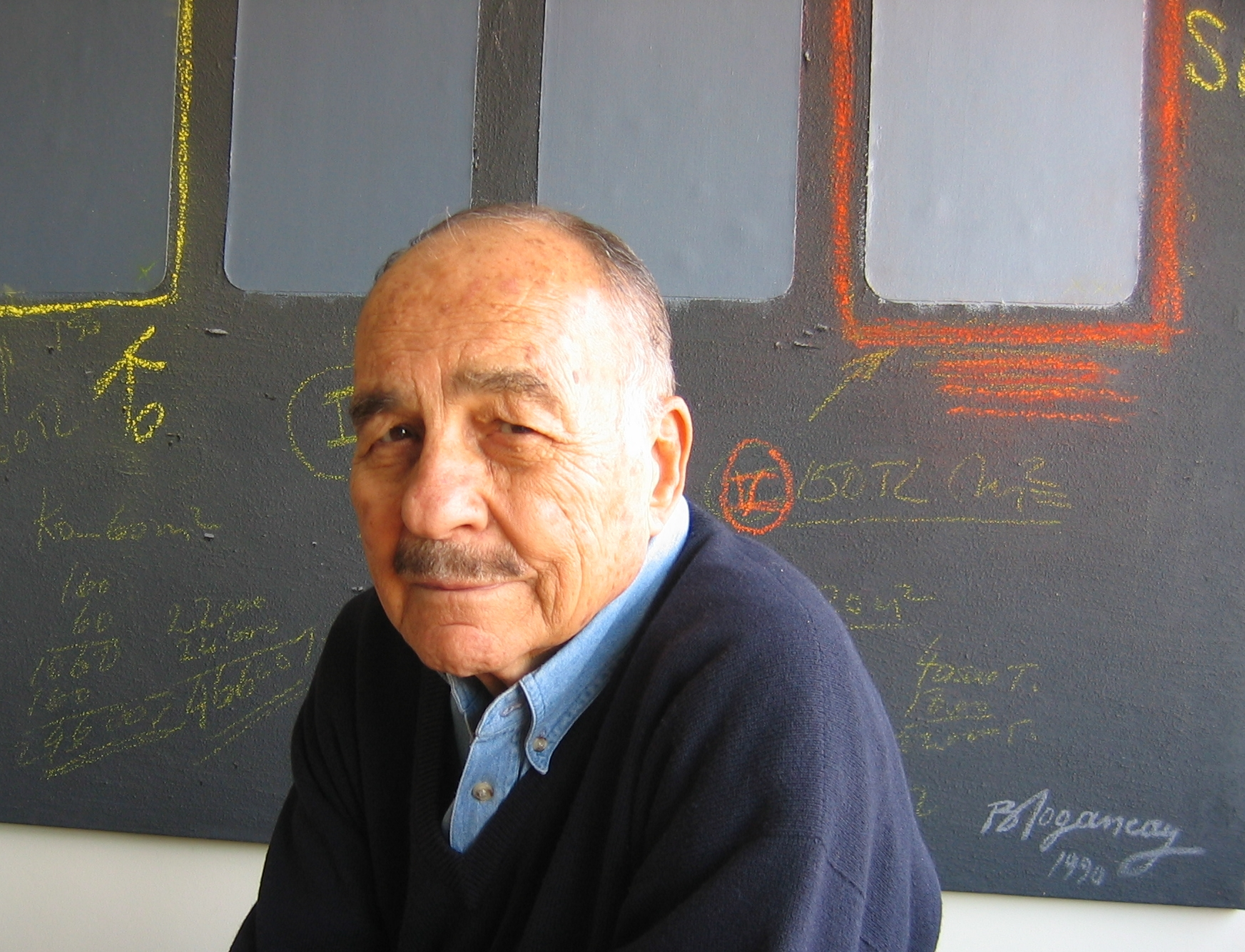
- Burhan Doğançay at the Doğançay Museum in 2010
- Born: 11 September 1929; Istanbul, Turkey
- Died: 16 January 2013 (aged 83)
- Education: University of Ankara, University of Paris, Académie de la Grande Chaumière
- Known for: Painting, Photography, Collage and Printmaking
- Notable work: Billboard (1964), Symphony in Blue (1987), Stonewall (2009)
- Movement: Street Art, Pop Art, Photorealism, Conceptual Art
- Spouse: Angela Hausmann (1978–2013; his death)
- Awards: Turkish National Medal for the Arts for Lifetime Achievement

Burhan C. Doğançay (11 September 1929 – 16 January 2013) was a Turkish-American artist. Doğançay is best known for tracking walls in various cities across the world for half a century, integrating them into his artistic work.

== Biography ==
Born in Istanbul, Turkey, Burhan Dogançay obtained his artistic training from his father Adil Doğançay, and Arif Kaptan, both well-known Turkish painters. In 1950, he received a law degree from the University of Ankara. While enrolled at the University of Paris between 1950 and 1955, from where he obtained a doctorate degree in economics, he attended art courses at the Académie de la Grande Chaumière. During this period he continued to paint regularly and to show his works in several group exhibitions. Soon after his return to Turkey, he participated in many exhibitions, including joint exhibitions with his father at the Ankara Art Lovers Club.

Following a brief career with the government (diplomatic service), which brought him to New York City in 1962, Dogançay decided in 1964 to devote himself entirely to art and to make New York his permanent home. He started searching the streets of New York for inspiration and raw materials for his collage and assemblages. He began to think it was impossible to make a reasonable living as an artist. Thomas M. Messer, director of the Solomon R. Guggenheim Museum for 27 years, significantly influenced Dogançay, urging him to stay in New York and face the city's challenges.

In the 1970s, Dogançay started traveling for his Walls of the World photographic documentary project. He met his future wife, Angela, at the Hungarian Ball at the Hotel Pierre in New York. In 2006, a painting by Doğançay titled Trojan Horse was gifted by the Turkish government to the OECD in Paris. Dogançay lived and worked during the last eight years of his life alternating between his studios in New York and Turgutreis, Turkey. He died at the age of 83 in January 2013.

== Artistic contribution ==
Since the early 1960s, Doğançay had been fascinated by urban walls and chose them as his subject. He considered them the barometer of societies and a testament to the passage of time, reflecting the emotions of a city, frequently withstanding the assault of the elements and the markings left by people. It began, Dogançay said, when something caught his eye during a walk along 86th street in New York:

It was the most beautiful abstract painting I had ever seen. There were the remains of a poster, and a texture to the wall with little bits of shadows coming from within its surface. The color was mostly orange, with a little blue and green and brown. Then, there were the marks made by rain and mud.

As a city traveler, for half a century he mapped and photographed walls in various cities worldwide. In this context, urban walls serve as documents of the respective climate and zeitgeist, as ciphers of social, political and economic change. Part of the intrinsic spirit of his work is to suggest that nothing is ever what it seems. Dogançay's art is wall art, and thus his sources of subjects are real. Therefore, he can hardly be labeled as an abstract artist, and yet at first acquaintance much of his work appears to be abstract. In Dogançay's approach, the serial nature of investigation and the elevation of characteristic elements to form ornamental patterns are essential. Within this, he formulates a consistent continuation of decollagist strategies – effectively the re-contextualised deconstruction of positions related to the nouveau réalistes. Dogançay may have started out as a simple observer and recorder of walls, but he fast made a transition to being able to express a range of ideas, feelings, and emotions in his work. His vision continued to broaden, driven both by content and technique.

=== Walls of the World ===
In the mid-1970s, Doğançay embarked on what he thought of as a secondary project: photographing urban walls all over the globe. These photographs – which Dogançay called Walls of the World – are an archive of our time and the seeds for his paintings, which also expressed contemporary times. The focus of his "encyclopedic" approach was exclusively directed toward the structures, signs, symbols and images that humans leave on walls. Here he found the entire range of the human condition in a single motif, without any cultural, racial, political, geographical, or stylistic, limitations. Dogançay got to the heart of his exploration when he said:

Walls are the mirror of society.

Doğançay's consequential execution, his radical thematic self-limitation and obsession with capturing what interested him most is comparable to other "documentarians" such as August Sander (portraits) and Karl Blossfeldt (plants). His pictures are not snapshots but elaborate segmentations of surfaces, subtle studies of materials, colors, structures and light, sometimes resembling monochromies in their radical reductionism. Over time, this project gained importance as well as content; after four decades it encompasses about 30'000 images from more than 100 countries across five continents. In 1982, images from the archive were exhibited as a one-man exhibition at the Centre Georges Pompidou, Paris; it later traveled to the Palais des Beaux-Arts, Brussels, and the Musée d'Art Contemporain, Montreal.

=== Painting and collage ===
With posters and objects gathered from walls forming the main ingredient for his work, Dogançay's preferred medium has been predominantly 'collage' and to some extent 'fumage'. Dogançay re-creates the look of urban billboards, graffiti-covered wall surfaces, as well as broken or neglected entrances, such as windows and doors, in different series. The only masters with whom he compares himself are Robert Rauschenberg and Jasper Johns from the last heroic period of art, of which he was a part. Doğançay, however, has always preferred to reproduce fragments of wall surface in their mutual relations just as he found them, and with minimal adjustment of color or position, rather than to up-end them or combine them casually as in the Rauschenberg manner.

In large measure his practice has been one of simulation in the spirit of record-keeping, carried out with the collector's rather than the scavenger's eye. In many cases, his paintings evoke the decay and destruction of the city, the alienated feeling that urban life is in ruins and out of control, and cannot be integrated again. Pictorial fragments are often detached from their original context and rearranged in new, sometimes inscrutable combinations. His complex and uniformly experimental painterly oeuvre ranges from photographic realism to abstraction, from pop art to material image/montage/collage.

In the 1970s and 1980s, he gained fame with his interpretation of urban walls in his signature ribbons series, which consist of clean paper strips and their calligraphy-like shadows. These contrast with his collaged billboard works, such as the Cones Series, Doors Series or Alexander's Walls. These brightly intense, curvilinear ribbon forms seem to burst forth from flat, solid-colored backgrounds. The graceful ribbonlike shapes take on a three-dimensional quality, especially as suggested by the implied shadows. This series later gave rise to alucobond–aluminum composite shadow sculptures and the series known as Aubusson Tapestries.

=== Tamarind lithography ===
In 1969, Henry Geldzahler, then head of 20th Century Art Department at the Metropolitan Museum of Art, secured a fellowship for Doğançay at the Tamarind Lithography Workshop in Los Angeles. The workshop, founded by June Wayne, was a ten-year project, attended by approximately seventy artists – among them were Ed Ruscha, Jim Dine, Josef Albers and Louise Nevelson – between 1960 and 1970, conceived to promote lithography in the USA. Doğançay created sixteen lithographs, including a suite of eleven impressions titled Walls V. These marked a turning point in his career as they are essentially a dialogue with flatness. At the workshop, in part because of the medium, he was obliged to relinquish his casual approach, inspired by his raw subject matter, in favor of organizing his work graphically. This imposed discipline helped him to create arresting new effects that led to more defined flat areas and brighter colors within the images. Doğançay created a new resolution between subject and method, and was a profound influence on his future evolution as an artist. A canon of high-colored tonality and visual impact has remained for him the essence of urban contradiction which he wants to share with viewers of his works.

=== Aubusson Tapestry ===
In Paris, Doğançay was introduced to Jean-François Picaud, owner of L'Atelier Raymond Picaud in Aubusson, France. Fascinated by Dogançay's Ribbons series and believing they would be ideal tapestry subjects, he invited Dogançay to submit several tapestry cartoons. In the words of Jean-François Picaud, "the art of tapestry has found its leader for the 21st century in Burhan Dogançay". The first three Dogançay tapestries woven in 1984 were an immediate critical success.

=== Art market ===
In November 2009, one of Doğançay's paintings, Mavi Senfoni (Symphony in Blue), was sold in auction to Murat Ülker for US$1,700,000. This collage relates to an impressive cycle of works within the Dogançay oeuvre, called Cones series, that evolved as a development of his iconic Breakthrough and Ribbon series and as an exhilarating exploration of the urban space. Together with its two sister works, Magnificent Era (collection of Istanbul Modern) and Mimar Sinan (private collection), Symphony in Blue is one of the largest and most expressive works in which Dogançay enters into a dialogue with the history of Turkey. It was executed in 1987 for the first International Istanbul Biennial. Istanbul Modern commissioned composer Kamran Ince to set Mavi Senfoni to music. The solo piano piece was premiered by Huseyin Sermet on 26 June 2012.

In May 2015, Doğançay's painting Mavi Güzel (Blue Beauty) from the Ribbon Series sold for TL 1,050,000 (US$390’000) at Antik AS in Istanbul

== Doğançay Museum ==
The Doğançay Museum is exclusively dedicated to the work of Burhan Doğançay, and to a minor extent also to the art of his father, Adil. It provides a retrospective survey of the artist's various creative phases from his student days up to his death, with about 100 works on display. Established in 2004, the Doğançay Museum in Istanbul's Beyoğlu district is being considered to be Turkey's first contemporary art museum. The museum is closed.

Doğançay's works are in the collections of many museums around the world including New York's MoMA, Metropolitan Museum of Art, The Solomon R. Guggenheim Museum as well as National Gallery of Art in Washington, MUMOK in Vienna, Musée National d'Art Moderne in Paris, Istanbul Modern in Istanbul, The Israel Museum in Jerusalem and The State Russian Museum in St. Petersburg.

== Works in public collections (selection) ==
- 1964: Billboard, New York, The Solomon R. Guggenheim Museum
- 1964: Yankees and Beatles, London, Tate Modern
- 1965: Eddie, Vienna, Albertina
- 1966: Peace of Mind, Mannheim, Kunsthalle
- 1966: Diner's Window, Dallas, Dallas Museum of Art
- 1966: J. Payn Window, Minneapolis, Walker Art Center
- 1969: New York Puzzle, Stuttgart, Staatsgalerie
- 1969: untitled, Washington, National Gallery of Art
- 1969: Walls V, New York, MoMA
- 1969: untitled, Cambridge/MA, Harvard Art Museums
- 1974: Red and Black Composition No. 5, New York, The Solomon R. Guggenheim Museum
- 1975: White Cone & Shadow, Basel, Kunstmuseum
- 1977: Heart No. 26, Saint-Paul de Vence, Fondation Maeght
- 1979: Lofty Ribbons, London, British Museum
- 1980s: Whispering Wall III, London, V&A Museum
- 1980s: #150, Vienna, MAK
- 1980: Long Lost Ribbons, Vienna, mumok stiftung ludwig
- 1980: untitled, Bruxelles, Royal Museums of Fine Arts of Belgium
- 1982: Ribbon Mania, New York, The Metropolitan Museum of Art
- 1987: Magnificent Era, Istanbul, Istanbul Modern
- 1987: Symphony in Blue, Istanbul, Yildiz Holding (Murat Ülker)
- 1989: Kinder, Hannover, Sprengel Museum
- 1989: Neruda, Stockholm, Moderna Museet
- 1989: Versace Man, Los Angeles, Los Angeles County Museum
- 1992: I Am Really Old, Salzburg, Museum oder Moderne
- 1995: Tit Steaks, Ann Arbor/MI, University of Michigan Museum of Art
- 1997: Garden of Eden, Munich, Pinakothek der Moderne
- 1997: Push Love, Saint Louis, Saint Louis Art Museum
- 1998: Two Fine Red Lines, Vienna, Albertina
- 2002: Red Ada, Geneva, Musée d'art et d'histoire (MAH)
- 2002: Throw FD, Pittsburgh, Carnegie Museum of Art
- 2008: Peace Partners, Cleveland, Cleveland Museum of Art
- 2009: Rising Star, Boston, Museum of Fine Arts Boston
- 2011: The Days of the Fez, Vienna, Albertina

== Awards ==
- 2005 – Contribution to the Arts Award given by the International Contemporary Art Exposition, İstanbul
- 2005 – Art Honor Award given by the Art Forum Plastic Arts Fair, Ankara
- 2004 – Honorary doctorate from Hacettepe University, Ankara
- 2004 – Painter of the Year Award given by Sanat Kurumu, Ankara
- 1995 – National Medal for the Arts for Lifetime Achievement & Cultural Contribution given by the President of the Republic of Turkey
- 1992 – Medal of Appreciation given by the Ministry of Culture of Russia
- 1984 – Enka Arts & Science Award, İstanbul
- 1969 – Tamarind Lithography Workshop Fellowship, Los Angeles
- 1964 – Certificate of Appreciation by the City of New York

== Exhibitions ==
=== Solo exhibitions (selection) ===
- 1976: Istanbul: Galeri Baraz. Burhan Dogançay
- 1977: Zurich: Kunstsalon Wolfsberg. Acrylmalereien und Gouachen 1966–1976
- 1982: Paris: Centre Georges Pompidou. Les murs murmurent, ils crient, ils chantent ...
- 1983: Montreal: Musée d'art contemporain de Montréal
- 1983: Antwerp: International Cultural Center
- 1989: Tokyo: The Seibu Museum of Art–Yurakucho Art Forum. Dogançay
- 1992: St. Petersburg: Russian Museum. Walls and Doors 1990–91
- 1993: Istanbul: Atatürk Cultural Center. Walls 1990–93 (Organized by Yahşi Baraz)
- 2000: New York: The Brooklyn Historical Society. Bridge of Dreams.
- 2001: Istanbul: Dolmabahçe Cultural Center. Dogançay: A Retrospective (Organized by Dr. Nejat F. Eczacıbaşı Foundation)
- 2001: Athens, Ohio: Kennedy Museum of Art–Ohio University. Dogançay–Wall Paintings from the Museum Collection
- 2003: Siegen: Siegerlandmuseum. Walls of the World
- 2012: Istanbul: Istanbul Modern. Fifty Years of Urban Walls: A Burhan Dogancay Retrospective
- 2014: Istanbul: Dogançay Museum. Picture the World: Burhan Dogançay as Photographer
- 2016: Ankara: CER Modern. Picture the World: Burhan Dogançay as Photographer
- 2016: Essen: Museum Folkwang. New to the collection: Burhan Dogancay
- 2016: Taipei: Taiwan National Museum of History. Picture the World: Burhan Dogançay as Photographer
- 2017: Vienna: Albertina. Burhan Dogançay (works on paper)
- 2018: Leverkusen: Museum Morsbroich. Zeichen an der Wand

=== Group exhibitions (selection) ===
- 1972: New York: Pace Gallery. Printmakers at Pace
- 1977: New York: Solomon R. Guggenheim Museum. From the American Collection
- 1983: Washington: National Museum of Natural History, Smithsonian Institution
- 1987: Istanbul: 1st International Istanbul Biennial
- 1999: New York: The Museum of the City of New York, The New York Century: World Capital, Home Town, 1900–2000
- 2006: Fredonia, N.Y.: Rockefeller Arts Center Art Gallery. Connoisseurship
- 2009: Salzburg: Museum der Moderne. SPOTLIGHT
- 2009: Biel/Bienne: CentrePasquArt. Collage–Décollage: Dogançay–Villeglé
- 2009: Berlin: Martin-Gropius-Bau. Istanbul Next Wave
- 2010: London: British Museum. Modern Turkish Art at the British Museum
- 2010: Minneapolis, MN: Walker Art Center, Perlman Gallery. 50/50: Audience and Experts Curate the Paper Collection
- 2012: Vienna: Belvedere, Orangerie. Kokoschka sucht einen Rahmen
- 2012: Maastricht: Bonnefantenmuseum. Different Impressions, Changing Traditions
- 2013: Boston: Museum of Fine Arts, Boston. Uncontainable Portraits
- 2013: Doha: Bahrain National Museum. Istanbul Modern-Bahrain
- 2013: Grenoble: Musée de Grenoble-Bibliothèque Teisseire-Malherbe. Les Mots dans l'Art
- 2013: Zurich: Museum Haus Konstruktiv. Hotspot Istanbul
- 2013: Minneapolis: Weisman Art Museum. Reviewing The Real
- 2013: New York: The Metropolitan Museum of Art. Fifty Years of Collecting Islamic Art
- 2014: Boston: Museum of Fine Arts. National Pride (and Prejudice)
- 2015: Stockholm: Moderna Museet. A Larger World
- 2015: Leverkusen: Museum Morsbroich. Eddie Murphy und die Milk-Brothers
- 2016: Los Angeles: LACMA. Islamic Art Now, Part 2
- 2016: Istanbul: Elgiz Museum. Faces & Masks
- 2016: Purchase/NY: Neuberger Museum of Art. Post No Bills: Public Walls as Studio and Source
- 2017: Minneapolis: Weisman Art Museum. Prince from Minneapolis
- 2017: Wolfsburg: Kunstmuseum Wolfsburg. Im Käfig der Freiheit
- 2017: Saint-Paul-de-Vence: Fondation Maeght. Is this how men live?
- 2018: Ankara: Evliyagil Museum. Icons of Thinking: Images and Texts
- 2019: Vienna: Albertina. Warhol to Richter
- 2019: Istanbul: Istanbul Modern. The Event of a Thread: Global Narratives in Textiles
- 2019: Wolfsburg: Kunstmuseum Wolfsburg. Now is the Time
- 2019: Geneva: MAMCO Musée d'art moderne et contemporain. Collection(s)
- 2020: London: Tate Modern. Materials and Objects: Collage
- 2021: London: British Museum. Reflections: Contemporary Art of the Middle East and North Africa
- 2021: Zurich: Museum Haus Konstruktiv. Works on Paper from the Collection
- 2021: Ann Arbor/MI: University of Michigan Museum of Art. You Are Here
