= Istanbul International Music Festival =

Cultural event held in Istanbul, Turkey

The Istanbul International Music Festival, formerly Istanbul Festival, (Turkish: Uluslararası İstanbul Müzik Festivali) is a cultural event held every June and July in Istanbul, Turkey. It offers a selection of European classical music, ballet, opera and traditional music performances with the participations of famous artists from all over the world. The festival was first held in 1973 and is organized by the Istanbul Foundation of Culture and Arts. In 2006, Borusan Holding took over its main sponsorship from Eczacıbaşı Holding.

The festival was the idea of the late Turkish businessman Dr. Nejat Eczacıbaşı. The first Istanbul Festival was held from June 15 to July 15, 1973, on the 50th anniversary of the foundation of the Republic of Turkey. From its first inception, the Istanbul Festival has aimed at including in its programs the finest examples of artistic creativity in all disciplines of art from both Turkey and abroad, as well as seminars, conferences and lectures. So, other festivals dedicated to film (1984), jazz (1986), contemporary art (1987) and theater (1989) were added to the program of Istanbul Festival. From 1994 on, the name was changed to Istanbul International Music Festival to distinguish it from the other sister festivals. It is accredited as a member of European Festivals Association since 1977. In 2014, a project title "Istanbul Music Festival Seeks Its Young Soloist" (Turkish: İstanbul Müzik Festivali Genç Solistini Arıyor) was started to promote talented young musicians.

From its beginning, the festival hosted artists and groups from La Scala Philharmonic (Riccardo Muti), New York Philharmonic (Kurt Masur and Zubin Mehta), Berlin Philharmonic to Royal Concertgebouw Orchestra (Wolfgang Sawallisch), Dresden Staatskapelle and the soloists, orchestra and chorus of the Mariinsky Theatre (Kirov Opera), from Orpheus Chamber Orchestra (Gidon Kremer) to Scottish Chamber Orchestra (Charles Mackerras and Richard Hickox), from Tokyo String Quartet to Hilliard Ensemble, from Aldo Ciccolini to Ivo Pogorelich, from Yehudi Menuhin to Itzhak Perlman, from Julian Lloyd Webber to Mischa Maisky, from Narciso Yepes to Christopher Parkening, from Leyla Gencer to Montserrat Caballé and Elisabeth Schwarzkopf, from Bolshoi Ballet to American Ballet Theatre and to Mark Morris, Mehmet Sander, Kibbutz dance companies; and such traditional music groups as Istanbul Oriental Ensemble of Burhan Öçal, Kudsi Ergüner’s Tac Mahal project and Whirling Dervishes. The 31st festival saw the conductor Lorin Maazel with the Bavarian Radio Symphony Orchestra and Cecilia Bartoli, who received a standing ovation from the audience for several minutes.

The festival venues include Galata Mevlevihanesi, Istanbul University Rectorate Building, Istanbul Modern and Santralistanbul Energy Museum, Zorlu Center PSM and Boğaziçi University Albert Long Hall in addition the Hagia Eirene Museum, Archaeological Museum, Tiled Kiosk, Süreyya Opera House and Lütfi Kırdar Convention and Exhibition Center.

According to a famed international musicologist, the Festival bridges cultural and religious divisions.

== See also ==
- Istanbul Biennial
- Istancool
- Istanbul International Jazz Festival
- International Istanbul Film Festival
