= Burhan Doğançay Series =

Series of artistic works by Burhan Doğançay

This is a list of creative periods (series) by Burhan Doğançay (11 September 1929 – 16 January 2013), a Turkish-American artist, who became famous for translating realistic objects such as billboards, posters, graffiti and other street art into seemingly abstract compositions. Considered the most influential Turkish-born artist of the post war-era, Dogancay's oeuvre is categorized into fourteen distinct series in which he predominantly used collage and fumage. While Dogançay spent most of his artistic career in New York City he always remained closely connected to his native Turkey. In addition, Dogancay created a photographic archive called Walls Of The World (1975-2012), which encompasses about 30,000 slides of walls in approximately 500 cities in over 100 countries.

== Creative Periods (Series) ==
The Dogancay Museum in Istanbul, Turkey dedicated to the artistic legacy of Burhan Doğançay, offers a visual survey of the evolution of his oeuvre, from his early figurative paintings to his wall-inspired art.

General Urban Walls (1963-2012)

Throughout his artistic life, Dogançay has been fascinated by urban walls, which he admires for their beauty, spontaneity, directness and temporal relevance. The paintings on view here - seemingly literal renditions of urban walls - are an early attempt to record both their explicit historical evidence and inherent beauty.

Doors (1965-2010)

Doors, a functional part of buildings are an integral part of walls. Therefore, they constitute a major focus of attention for Doğançay and occupy an important place in his artistic career.

Detours (1966-1995)

The early Detours works were part and parcel of the General Urban Walls Series, but in the 1990s Detours emerged as a distinctive, freestanding group of its own. Inspired by those wooden barriers or fences that are prominently erected to announce an alternate route in the road with the word ‘Detour’ and arrows to indicate the direction to follow, the later paintings are less restrained and tend to be more elaborate. They are all distinguished by what appear to be horizontally placed planks or boards, created by acrylic, mixed media with collage, and most often with wooden panels mounted on canvas.

New York Subway Walls (1967 – 2002)

The New York City Subway Walls series started with Walls of New York City and grew during Doğançay’s extensive travels which inspired him to paint walls that reflect certain characters about a particular city’s walls. This series includes works that were inspired by New York’s subway walls as early as 1967 and some thirty years later before and while New York’s subway stations underwent a major restoration.

Cones (1972-1990)

Cones are a frequently appearing phenomenon on walls as posters often curl up under the influence of the elements and human touch. Most paintings from this series incorporate collage, Dogançay’s medium of preference and fumage, a blackening effect achieved with a burning candle.

Breakthroughs (1972 – 1977)

The Breakthrough series originated in the early seventies. They are predominantly red and show unambiguously two layers of paper, with the top one curling or “breaking through” or away from the bottom layer. The added shadows cast by the top layer give these paintings a three dimensional depth. This series was also a real breakthrough for Dogançay in his exploration of walls and is the precursor to the Ribbons and Cones series.

Ribbons (1972 – 1989)

The Ribbons series emerged in the early 1970s and was a noticeable departure from Dogançay’s earlier wall-textured and collage works. They mark a transition from realistic renditions of weather beaten, grimy urban walls to a more refined and seemingly more abstract approach. Dogançay attempts to play with light and shadow in these deceptively orderly and disciplined works. From the background, layers of torn shreds of paper (ribbons) project from the wall and cast shadows that form calligraphic shapes. The Ribbons series also forms the basis for Dogançay’s shadow sculptures and Aubusson tapestries of which one sample is being showcased at the museum entrance

Housepainter Walls' (1982-1991)

Doğançay was inspired to paint the Housepainter series by walls he saw in Turkey and Poland where housepainters had painted test patches alongside the paint’s cost per square meter.

Grego’s Walls (1988 – 2012)

While walking in New York’s SoHo one day, Doğançay came across a multicolored brick wall, which had the name ‘Grego’ written on it. Wondering why bricks aren’t multicolored in reality, Dogançay was moved to bring color and joy to simple bricks. The name Grego appears in the vast majority of these works and almost became an alter ego for Dogançay, enabling him to demonstrate through artwork how walls speak of issues and address passers-by.

Formula I (1990 – 1991)

Works from the Formula I series were inspired in Monaco during the Formula One car races. During the races, the advertisements on the walls are often covered with black plastic so as to eliminate any distractions to the drivers. All the paintings from this series incorporate black plastic as their main feature.

Double Realism (1990-2009)

Works from the Double Realism series incorporate three major elements; actual objects found on walls, light and shadow. In these pictures, it is not immediately apparent whether the shadows are real or painted.

Alexander's Walls (1995 – 2000)

Alexander’s Walls series originated in New York in 1995. Their inspiration was provided by the once popular Alexander's department store in mid-Manhattan. When the department store went out of business, its exterior was boarded up, covered with posters, and subsequently covered with black paper and black paint. The paper eventually showed signs of wear and tear. To Doğançay, the bright colors showing through the rips, tears and holes in the black ground looked like flowers in a splendid garden.

Blue Walls of New York (1998 – 2004)

This series is essentially a continuation of the New York Subway Walls series. It was inspired in 1998 when the New York subway started to undergo a major restoration. The blue painted construction fences which were erected on subway platforms and on some streets of Manhattan provided the inspiration for this series, which also incorporates stickers and graffiti.

Framed Walls' (2008-2012)

These mature collages fill the areas of their canvas tightly from edge to edge and are Dogançay’s final series. Their distinctive feature is the juxtaposition of framed portraits that contrast with the chaotic profusion of comments and images that surround them.
