= Doğançay Museum =

Museum in Turkey

Dogancay Museum
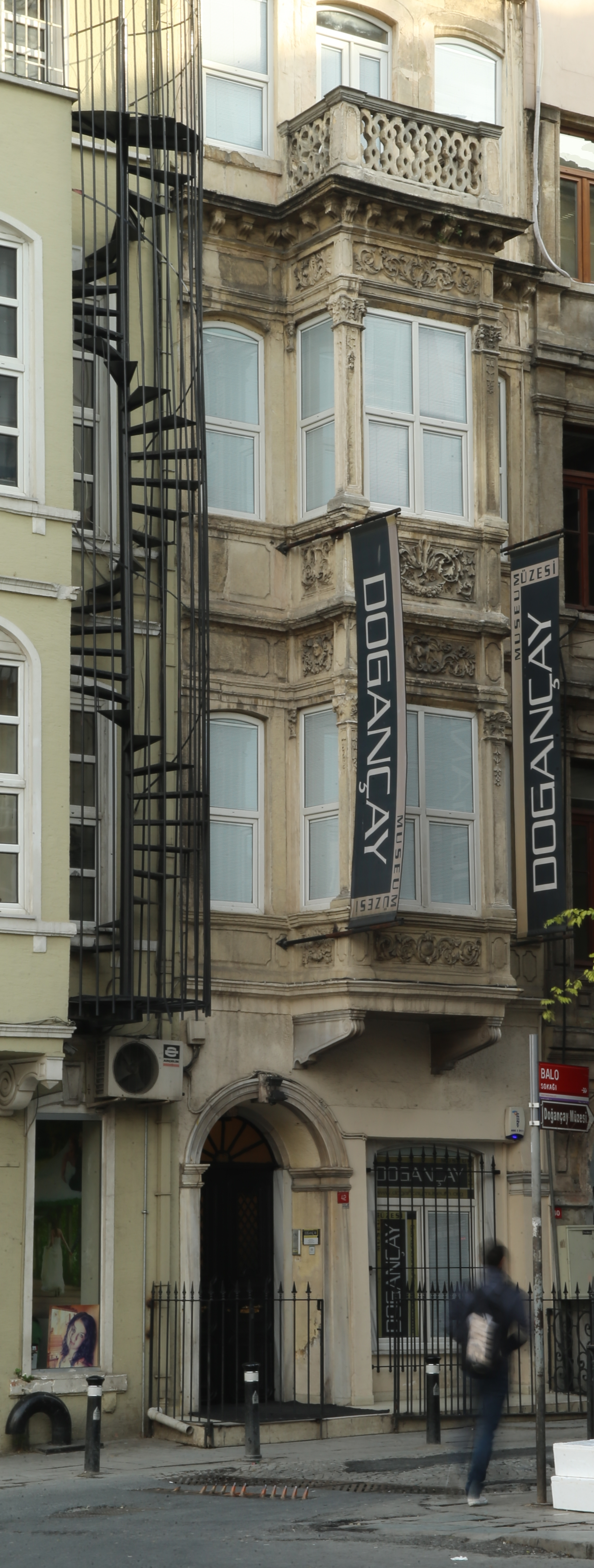
- Established: 2004
- Location: Balo Sokak 42, 34335 Beyoğlu-Istanbul
- Coordinates: 41°02′09″N 28°58′42″E

The Doğançay Museum (Turkish: Doğançay Müzesi), Turkey’s first modern art museum, is dedicated to the artistic legacy of Burhan Doğançay.

== History ==
The museum officially opened its doors to the public in 2004. It is housed in a historic 150-year-old five-story building - once an elegant home to a Greek family - located in the heart of bustling Beyoğlu district of Istanbul. Just like a vast number of other important landmark buildings in Beyoglu, the museum was originally in a state of complete disrepair when Burhan Doğançay purchased it in 1999. From the very beginning, however, Dogancay envisaged that this architecturally inviting building would become his museum. Following a major four-year renovation, it was restored to its former glory and its interior converted to meet exacting museum standards.

It was Doğançay’s plan to commit a considerable amount of time and energy to provide a home that would showcase a mini-retrospective, spanning over five decades of his prolific and rich artistic production. Even the elevator car provides exhibition space for a small display of photographs from photographic “The Ironworkers Project”. Since 2010, the Doğançay Museum has been operated under the auspices of the Burhan-Angela Doğançay Foundation for Art and Culture. When Burhan Dogancay died in 2013, the foundation stopped collecting his works of art and began to concentrate on presenting what it already owned. Far beyond its material worth, the true value of the museum and its collection lies in the pleasure and passion for art it ignited in thousands of visitors from all over the world. A full-time director takes care of its day-to-day business, educational programs and special events. Upon entering the museum, visitors are amazed how one instantly leaves behind the hustle and bustle of the city.

== Layout ==
While the museum is dedicated almost exclusively to the work of its founder Burhan Doğançay, one floor has been set aside for the work of the artist's father, Adil Doğançay, a well-known Turkish impressionist painter. With over 100 works on display, the museum offers a stunning visual survey of the evolution of Burhan Doğançay's oeuvre, from his early figurative paintings to his wall-inspired art. The collection covers a wide range of media and materials and includes paintings, drawings, sculptures, prints, photographs and Aubusson tapestries. It was Doğançay's explicit intention that the museum collection would demonstrate how far the speaking walls, which initially provided the inspiration for his work, have developed in experimental and exciting ways over the past five decades.

=== Ground floor ===
The museum's reception area is located on the ground floor, as is its gift shop and tearoom, where visitors are treated to tea each afternoon. An Aubusson tapestry based on a Ribbons Series design (one of fourteen that have been produced at L’Atelier Raymond Picaud), photographs, and lithographs are also exhibited in this area. A photographic portrait of Dogançay taken by Christa Frieda Vogel greets visitors as they enter from the street.

=== First floor ===
On the first floor, of particular note are works from the Cones Series and the Ribbons Series that both emerged in the early 1970s, marking an important transition from Dogançay's hitherto realistic rendering of weather-beaten, grimy walls to a more refined, abstract approach that incorporates elegant experiments in shadow and light and dimension. Also exhibited on the first floor are examples from the GREGO Series, named after a New York graffiti artist who almost became an alter ego for Dogançay, enabling him to demonstrate through artwork how walls speak of issues and address passersby.

=== Second floor ===
On the second floor, the display from various Dogançay wall-inspired series begins. While urban walls may be their recurring theme, the different styles in which they are rendered and the techniques employed vary greatly from series to series.

=== Third floor ===
Visitors will discover the Adil Doğançay Collection and Early Figurative Works by Burhan Doğançay. Throughout his artistic career, Adil Doğançay cultivated Impressionist sensibilities as well as their techniques. Up close the use of open and relatively heavy brushwork is most apparent, yet observed from a distance each painting seems to capture a moment in time, in which the light and line of its subject is everything.

== Elementary school art competition ==
Since 2005, the museum in cooperation with the Greater Istanbul Municipality and corporate sponsors, has organized and presented a juried elementary school art competition. Each year an average of 7,000 students between the ages of eight and fourteen, from 1,500 schools, have submitted their applications for this event.

== See also ==
- List of single-artist museums
