= Bekir Sıtkı Erdoğan =

- Born: 1926; Karaman, Turkey
- Died: August 24, 2014 (aged 87–88) Istanbul, Turkey
- Genres: Ottoman classical music, Turkish makam music
- Occupations: composer, lyrics author

Bekir Sıtkı Erdoğan (1926 – August 24, 2014) was a Turkish poet and songwriter.

He graduated in 1948 from a military college and served as a regimental officer. Later he graduated from the Faculty of Linguistics, History and Geography and taught literature at the Turkish Naval High School, Deutsche Schule Istanbul and Marmara College.

== Career ==
Erdoğan has written folk poetry in syllabic metric and aruz. He used Turkish lyrics in a number of songs. His Ruba'ic poems were published by Hisar.

He wrote the lyrics for the 50th anniversary of the Turkish Republic; "Cumhuriyetin 50. Yıl Marşı". The musical was organized by Necil Kazım Akses.

== Bibliography ==
- Bir Yağmur Başladı (1949-1957)
- Dostlar Başına (1965)
- Kışlada Bahar (1970)
- Binbirinci Gece

== Music lyrics ==
- Kara gözlüm efkarlanma gül gayri (1963)
- Ve Ben Yalnız (1968, Music by Selmi Andak)
- Hancı (1977, Music by Gaston Rolland; Arrangement by Paul Mauriat - Toccata)

== See also ==
- List of composers of classical Turkish music
