= Selçuk Alagöz =

Turkish musician (1944–2025)

Selçuk Alagöz (5 August 1944 – 5 August 2025) was a Turkish singer and songwriter.

== Life and career ==
After graduating from the German High School Istanbul, he studied economics at Istanbul University and then completed his master's degree in tourism management. In 1964, he participated in the "Golden Microphone" competition organized by Hürriyet newspaper. He continued his musical studies with his eponymous orchestra and his sister Rana Alagöz, who was the soloist of the orchestra. The Alagöz brothers participated in the Golden Microphone in 1967 with an orchestra including Cahit Berkay and Engin Yörükoğlu.

In 1970, together with his siblings Rana and Ali Alagöz, he represented Turkey at the 3rd Appollonia International Music Festival held in Athens. Among his memorable works are Naftas of the Belt, Castle Indir Beni, Bahçee Came Bahar, Edremit Van'a Bakar, Malabadi Bridge and "I Am Crazy, I Love".

Beginning in 1979, he organized touristic shows with his siblings Rana Alagöz, Ali Alagöz and Nilüfer Alagöz, who later joined the band.

In 2010 he was awarded the Golden Butterfly Award.

Alagöz died on 5 August 2025, his 81st birthday. His death was announced by his daughter on his social media account. He was interred at Zincirlikuyu Cemetery in İstanbul.
