= Zeyyat Selimoğlu =

Turkish writer and translator

Zeyyat Selimoğlu (31 March 1922 in Istanbul – 1 July 2000 in Istanbul) was a Turkish writer and translator.

He studied at the Deutsche Schule Istanbul and at the Istanbul University Faculty of Law.

He translated Heinrich Böll, Friedrich Dürrenmatt or Johann Wolfgang von Goethe to Turkish language.

== Awards ==
- 1970: Sait Faik Hikâye Armağanı

== Partial bibliography ==
- Koca Denizde İki Nokta (1973)
- Karaya Vurdu Deniz (1975)
- Yavru Kayık (1979)
- Derin Dondurucu İçin Öykü (1995)
