= Oya Eczacıbaşı =

Turkish curator

- Born: Oya Esener; 1959 (age 66–67); Istanbul, Turkey
- Education: Boğaziçi University (BA); University of Leicester (MA)
- Occupation: Chair of Istanbul Modern
- Spouse: Bülent Eczacıbaşı (m. 1980)
- Children: 2

Oya Eczacıbaşı (née Esener; born 1959) is a Turkish curator. She is the Chair of Board of the Istanbul Modern.

== Biography ==
She was born in 1959 in Istanbul as the daughter of the former Turkish Minister of Labour and Social Security Prof. Turhan Esener.

Eczacibaşı completed her high school studies at the Lycée Marie Curie in Strasbourg, and achieved her university degree in management science at Boğaziçi University’s Faculty of Administrative Sciences. Additionally, she has a master’s degree in museum management from the University of Leicester.

Eczacibaşı became a member of the Biennial Advisory Board of the İstanbul Foundation for Culture and Arts (İKSV) in 1985. In 1987, she was in charge of organizing the Military Museum exhibits of the 1st Istanbul Biennial.

She has been involved with numerous non-governmental organizations over the years. She served on the Board of Trustees of Robert College between 1994 and 2011, the Board of Directors of the Hisar Educational Foundation between 1996 and 2006, the Board of Directors of the Educational Volunteers Foundation of Turkey (TEGV) between 2003 and 2006, and the Executive Committee of the İstanbul Foundation for Culture and Arts between 2002 and 2008.

Currently, Eczacıbaşı serves on the Boards of İKSV and Istanbul Modern. She is also a member of the International Council of the Museum of Modern Art (MoMA).

Between 2002 and 2007, Eczacıbaşı taught museum management at Boğaziçi University.

In 2011, Eczacıbaşı received the "Chevalier dans l'Ordre National de la Légion d'Honneur" from the Republic of France.

Eczacıbaşı married Bülent Eczacıbaşı (born 1949), the son of entrepreneur Nejat Eczacıbaşı on December 19, 1980. The couple has a son Emre and a daughter Esra. She is fluent in English French and German.
