= Jeffi Medina =

Turkish businessman (born 1950)

- Born: 1950 (age 75–76); Istanbul, Turkey
- Education: University of Strasbourg, Istanbul University
- Occupations: Businessman, Advertising Executive
- Years active: 1974–present
- Known for: Co-founder of Medina Turgul DDB; Former President of Advertising Association of Turkey
- Notable work: Leadership in Turkish advertising industry

Jeffi Medina (born 1950, Istanbul) is a prominent Turkish Jewish businessman in the advertisement sector of Turkey.

== Biography ==
He was born in 1950 in Istanbul, Turkey, into a family of Sephardic Jews. He graduated from the German High School Istanbul and went to Strasbourg, France, to study economics at the University of Strasbourg. He completed his university studies at the Istanbul University and graduated with a degree in economics. He started his professional life as a television producer in 1974. In 1978, he joined the advertising agency Manajans, which is the oldest advertising agency in Turkey. In 1987, he was promoted to general manager of Manajans. After six years at this post, he left Manajans and founded with Turkish film director, screenwriter and businessman Yavuz Turgul, the advertising agency Medina/Turgul in 1993. Their agency merged with DDB to form the Medina Turgul DBB advertising agency in 1995. Between the years 2004-2007 he served as President of the Reklamcılar Derneği (Advertising Association of Turkey) and since 2007 serves as the Chairman of the Board of Directors.

Aside from his business activities, Jeffi Medina is a very active participant in various private sector organizations, and publishes articles.
