= Deutsche Schule Istanbul =

- Özel Alman Lisesi

Location
- Şahkulu Bostanı Sk. 8; 34420 Beyoğlu; Istanbul; Turkey; 41°01′40″N 28°58′32″E

Information
- School type: Private international high school
- Established: 1 May 1868
- Principal: German: Georg Leber; Turkish: Melek Yıldırım
- Teaching staff: 51 German, 36 Turkish
- Enrollment: 640
- Color: Blue-White
- Website: ds-istanbul.net

Deutsche Schule Istanbul (English: German School of Istanbul, shortened as DSI), with formal Turkish name Özel Alman Lisesi (English: Private German High School) or İstanbul Alman Lisesi (English: German High School of Istanbul) or simply Alman Lisesi (English: German High School) is a private international high school in the Beyoğlu district of Istanbul, Turkey. It is responsible to both the Federal Ministry of Education and Research of Germany and the Ministry of National Education of Turkey.

It was established in 1868 as German and Swiss Citizens School Based upon Equality Principle, to serve to the German-speaking community in the city. In 1871, a building near Galata Tower was built for the school. The building took serious damage during the 1894 Istanbul earthquake, therefore, in 1897, the school moved to another building which is still being used by the school. After a few years, the school also started to accept Turkish-speaking students. In 1918, after World War I, the school was closed and the building was used by the occupation forces. After the declaration of the Republic on Turkey in 1923, the school was opened again in 1924. In 1925, it moved back to its actual building. It was closed once again in 1945 because of Turkey's political position against Germany during World War II, and the building was used by Beyoğlu High School for Girls. In 1953, the building was given back to Deutsche Schule Istanbul and the school has used the same building since then.

Every alumni of the school gets an opportunity to take a matriculation exam to get an Abitur diploma. Alumni with the Abitur diploma are able to apply for any university in Austria, Germany or Switzerland. Deutsche Schule Istanbul is one of the two educational institutes in Turkey that has rights to give this diploma, along with the Istanbul High School.

== History ==
Between 1867 and 1868, there was an attempt to establish an educational institute for the German-speaking community in Istanbul by unifying with the German Protestant Community School (German: Deutsche Evangelische Gemeindeschule) which started to serve to the German (noun) Protestant community in the city after 1863. But due to a disagreement of these two sides, the attempt failed. On May 1, 1868, the German School Administration Society founded a school called German and Swiss Citizens School Based upon Equality Principle (German: Paritaetische Deutsche und Schweizer Bürgerschule) for the German-speaking community in Istanbul. It was located in Kumdibi Street of Beyoğlu and started on service on May 11. The classes were given by two teachers in a rental building, with 24 students. The school also had a separate section in order to tutor the commercial field (German: Bürgerschule). It adopted social equality principle and was educating without any bond to any religion or sect. The first principal of the school was Adolf Engelkind. After a while, Swiss people started to attend to the school community, and in 1871, a building near Galata Tower was built for the school. The school moved to the new building on August 28, 1872, and on December 1, 1872, Protestant community members also joined to the school which caused the closure of the German Protestant Community School.

On May 31, 1882, a kindergarten entered into service in the same building. The building was seriously damaged after the earthquake on July 10, 1894, leading to a search for a new location. In the first years the school accepted only German-speaking students. In 1879, Bericht von Felix Theodor Mühlmann, the principal, the preparatory school which allowed the registration of non-German-speaking students. The construction of the new school building -which is the current one- started in June 1896, with the support of master architect Kapp von Gültstein and the Ottoman Bank Director Wülfing. On September 14, 1897, the school moved to the new building which contained 15 classes and a conference hall. The official license for the school was issued on January 9, 1897. The German Emperor Wilhelm II, during his visit of Istanbul in 1898, also visited the school and gave it the license to issue the German high school diploma, which made Deutsche Schule Istanbul the first school that was granted the license to issue the German high school diploma outside of Germany. The total number of students between 1893 and 1903 was 600, reaching 1,000 in 1916. In 1903, the two-storied section of the school building was built. By the order of the Ottoman government the school was issued a new license on December 27, 1911, with which it was henceforth considered to be at the same level with Ottoman high schools (idadi). The total number of students was 600 between 1893 and 1903, and by 1916, the number of students reached to 1,000. After World War I, the school was closed and the building was used by the French occupation forces as barracks. Almost all the inventory of the school was destroyed during that period.

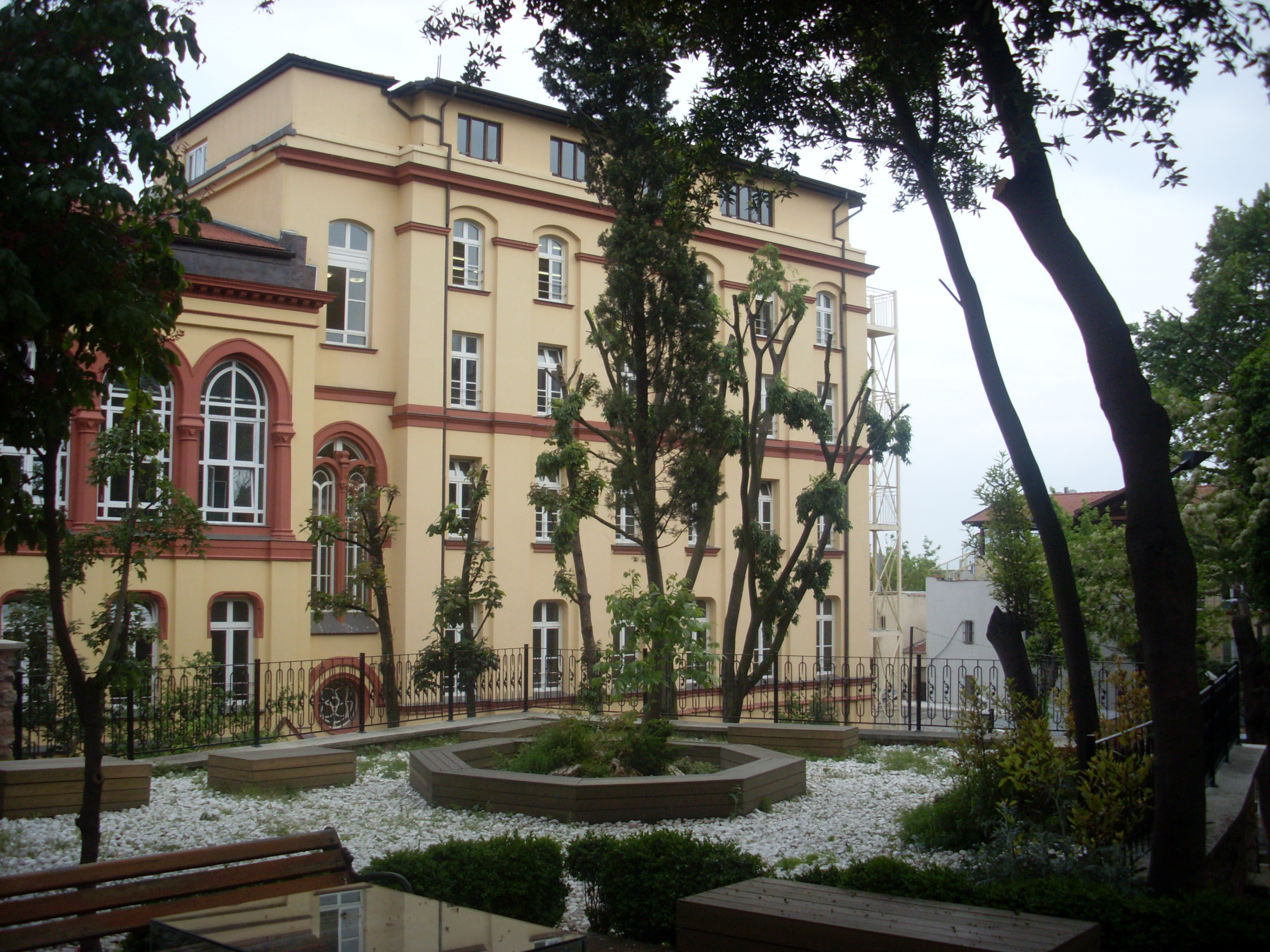
Backyard of Galata Mevlevihanesi with the building of Deutsche Schule Istanbul at the back

After the declaration of the Republic of Turkey in 1923, the occupation forces withdrew. In November 1924, the school was re-opened on Polonya Street (now Nuruziya Street) in a rental building. A kindergarten opened in the same building, but closed a year later. On January 1, 1925, the kindergarten started to operate again only for the German-speaking community. On September 1, 1925, the school moved back into the current building. In 1944, after World War II, the school was closed again. The building was returned once again to the Deutsche Schule Istanbul in July 1953, and education resumed on October 1. In 1959, a few renovations and developments were made, a sports hall and a music room were added.

A female-only sports hall was built in 1974. The next year, some renovations and expansions were made for the sports hall of the male students. By 1976, Turkish students were allowed to take a matriculation exam in order to get the Abitur diploma. In 1979, folk dance groups of the school made a trip to Germany, and the next year a group of Turkish students made a trip to Germany for the first time. By the 1985-86 education year, a student exchange program started between Germany and Turkey. Before the start of the 1989-90 education year, an informatics laboratory was established.

The Istanbul Chief Public Prosecutor's Office started an investigation about a corruption scandal in 2015, after a claim was made by the new board of the school accusing a group of 20 former board members and staff. Defendants were charged by malfeasance in office, malpractice, and embezzlement in 2013. These claims were announced publicly after the new board gets in charge. According to the allegement made by the Federal Foreign Office, board members stole €1,922,047 and ₺2,155,246 from the school.

== Organizational structure and education ==
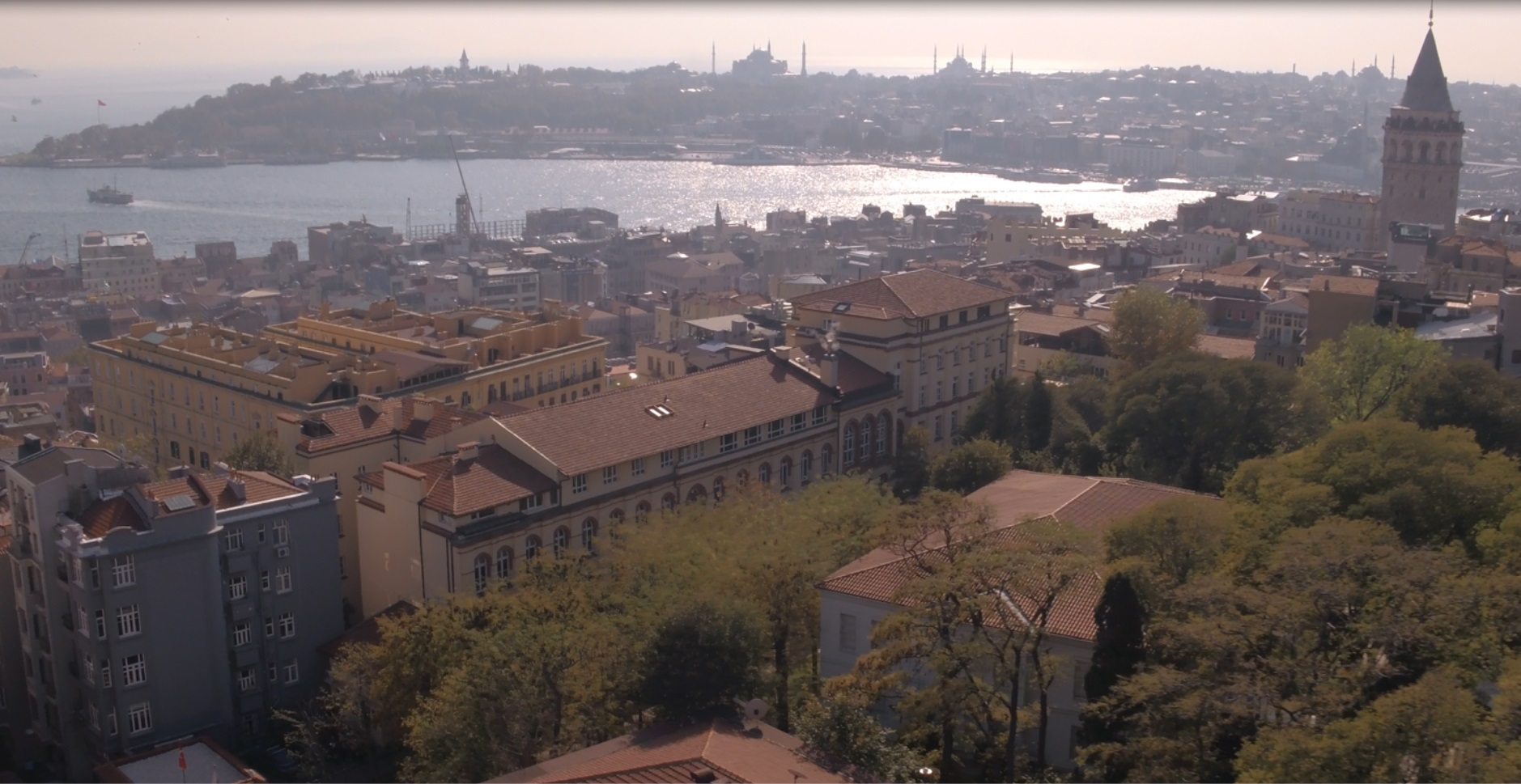
Aerial view of the school

The school is responsible to both the Federal Ministry of Education and Research of Germany and the Ministry of National Education of Turkey. It is administrated by the board of the Deutsche Schule Istanbul Administration Association (Turkish: İstanbul Özel Alman Lisesi İdare Derneği, German: Verein zum Betrieb der Deutschen Schule Istanbul) and the principal of the school is affiliated with the board.

Students take five years of high school education, including one year of preparatory education. Mediums of instruction are in German, English and Turkish. Student can also take elective French course.

Every alumni of the high school gets a regular high school diploma and a Deutsches Sprachdiplom document. They also have the opportunity to take the matriculation exam to get an Abitur diploma which allows them to apply for any university in Austria, Germany or Switzerland. Deutsche Schule Istanbul is among two educational institutes in Turkey that has rights to give the diploma along with the Istanbul High School. Every year, at least one alumni with Abitur diploma gets a scholarship of German Academic Exchange Service to study in Germany. In addition to this, since 2001, the board of the school gives a scholarship every year to one alumni which has passed the Abitur examination.

In the education year of 2016–17, the school had 640 students and 87 educators (51 German, 36 Turkish).

== Facilities ==
The school has a library which contains materials such as books, dictionaries, magazines, atlases, audio books, DVDs, comics, graphic novels etc. It also has 2 physics laboratories, 2 chemistry laboratories, 2 biology laboratories and an informatics laboratory, a music hall, a music studio; alongside an indoor sports hall and a conference hall (both in construction).

== Extracurricular activities ==
The first yearbook of the school was released in 1961. Between 1978 and 1981, a Zeit der Tanztee event was organized once in a year. Theatre community of the school was founded during 1985-86 education season. In 1981, Sosis Günü (Sausage Day), and in 1982, Okul Şenliği (School Festival) events were started to be organized. In 1983, the first edition of traditional Atatürk Koşusu (Atatürk Run) event was held in the Belgrad Forest.

Students of the school participate to the annual song contest between high schools, High Schools Music Contest (Turkish: Liselerarası Müzik Yarışması). The school won numerous achievements in the contest such as the second place in the Best Orchestra and the Best Stage Performance in 2006, first place in the Best Orchestra and Special Press Prize for Bands in 2012, and the second place in the Best Female Singer category in 2017. Each year, the school participates at the Model United Nations conference of the Model United Nations Club, the Turkish International Model United Nations conference of the Üsküdar American Academy, the MUNESCO conference of Bilkent University Preparatory School and the MUNESCO conference in Europe.

In the 2016-17 education year, student clubs at the school were:

- Movie Watching Club
- Photography Club
- Painting Club
- Chorus Music Club (Turkish and German)
- Orchestra-Studio (Turkish)
- Renaissance Club (Turkish)
- Theatre Club (Turkish)
- Writing Club
- Basketball Club (male)
- Folk and Latin Dances Club
- Modern Dances Club
- Handball Club (male)
- Chess Club
- Volleyball Club (female)
- Yoga Club
- Latin Language Club
- Europe Youth Club
- Preparation for Natural Disasters Club
- Electronics Club
- Philosophy Club
- Science and Technology Club
- Travelling and Tourism Club
- Occupation Introduction Club
- Model United Nations Club
- Mass Media Club
- Psychology Club
- Robotics Club
- International Youth Award Club
- Social Service Club (only for 11th grade students)

== Alumni associations ==
Alumni association of the school, Alumni Association of Istanbul German High School (German: Verein der Ehemaligen Schüler der Deutschen Schule Istanbul, Turkish: İstanbul Alman Liseliler Derneği) was founded in 1976. The association organizes Sosis Günü (Sausage Day), Yeni Yıl Yemeği (New Year Dinner) and Back to School events once in a year.

In 1996, alumni of the school established a foundation called German High School Culture and Education Foundation (Turkish: Alman Liseliler Kültür ve Eğitim Vakfı, shortened as ALKEV). In 2000, the foundation established ALKEV Private Schools in Büyükçekmece, which gives education from the kindergarten level, up to the secondary school level. In 2013, the high school section of the school was founded.

== Educators ==
Notable educators that served at the school are:

- Paul Lange, music teacher (1890s)
- Friedrich Schrader (1895–1890)
- Reşad Ekrem Koçu, history teacher
- Bekir Sıtkı Erdoğan, literature teacher
- Friedrich Giese, head teacher (1899–1905)
- Artur Dinter, natural sciences teacher (1904–1905)
- Karl Steuerwald, modern languages teacher (1930–1931)
- Rakım Çalapala
- Zeki Cemal Bakiçelebioğlu

== Alumni ==
Notable alumni that graduated from the school are (numbers in brackets indicate the year of graduation):

- Nazan Aksoy
- Selçuk Alagöz
- Ahmet Arpad
- Turgut Atakol
- Sevil Atasoy
- Oktar Babuna
- Sevim Burak
- Zeynep Buyraç
- Şahnaz Çakıralp
- Mehmet Ferden Çarıkçı (1987)
- Turgay Demirel
- Bülent Eczacıbaşı (1968)
- Faruk Eczacıbaşı
- Safiye Erol
- Deniz Gökçe
- Beatrice Heuser (1978)
- Hayri İnönü (1972)
- Kerem Kabadayı (1996)
- Kenan Kalav
- Akif Çağatay Kılıç
- Melih Kibar
- Erkin Koray
- Haluk Kurosman
- Atıl Kutoğlu (1986)
- Richard von Kühlmann
- Hans Lange
- Beral Madra (1961)
- Jeffi Medina
- Michael Meinecke (1959)
- Fatma Ceren Necipoğlu
- Münib Engin Noyan
- Yavuz Nutku
- Alev Oraloğlu
- Lale Oraloğlu
- Mustafa Santur
- Ayşe Sarısayın (1976)
- Osman F. Seden
- Zeyyat Selimoğlu (1944)
- Serhat (1983)
- Faruk Şen
- Burhan Şenatalar
- Umut Tabak
- Meral Tamer
- Harun Tekin (1996)
- Ali Teoman (1981)
- Sinan Tara
- Cem Uzan
- Ahmet Emin Yalman (1907)
- Tezcan Yaramancı
- Tansu Yeğen
- Mihal Zallari
- Dilek Zaptçıoğlu
- Cüneyd Zapsu (1974)

== See also ==
- List of high schools in Istanbul
- Education in the Ottoman Empire
