= Bülent Eczacıbaşı =

Turkish businessman

- Born: 1949 (age 76–77); Istanbul, Turkey
- Education: Deutsche Schule Istanbul; Imperial College London (BS); Massachusetts Institute of Technology (MS)
- Occupations: Chairman, Eczacıbaşı
- Board member of: Istanbul Modern; İstanbul Foundation for Culture and Arts (İKSV)
- Spouse: Oya Esener (m. 1980)
- Children: 2
- Parent(s): Nejat Eczacıbaşı; Fatma Beyhan Ergene

Bülent Eczacıbaşı (Turkish pronunciation: [byˈlænt edʒzaːdʒɯbaˈʃɯ]; born 1949) is an esteemed Turkish businessman. He is chairman of the board at Eczacıbaşı Holding, a Turkish conglomerate founded by his father, Nejat Eczacıbaşı.

He is a member of the Trilateral Commission.

== Background ==
Eczacıbaşı was born in İstanbul in 1949 to Nejat Eczacıbaşı (1913–1993), founder of the Eczacıbaşı Group of Companies, and his wife Fatma Beyhan (née Ergene) (1923–2004). He has a younger brother, Faruk, who was born in 1954.

Eczacıbaşı graduated from Imperial College London after his secondary education at the Deutsche Schule Istanbul. He obtained his master's degree in chemical engineering from the Massachusetts Institute of Technology. After initiating his professional career in 1974 at Eczacıbaşı Holding, he held a variety of managerial positions in the Holding's subsidiaries. In 1995, he took on his current position as Chairman of Eczacıbaşı Holding.

Eczacibasi is married to Oya Esener (born 1959), the daughter of Prof. Turhan Esener, who twice served as Turkey's Labour and Social Security Minister. They have a son, Nejat Emre, and a daughter, Esra, who work at Eczacıbaşı Holding. Both Bülent Eczacıbaşı and Oya Eczacıbaşı are major benefactors to the Istanbul Museum of Modern Art. Oya Eczacıbaşı is Chair of the Museum's Board.

Eczacıbaşı has received French and Italian awards of merit, respectively the Chevalier dans l'Ordre National de la Légiond'Honneur (English: The National Order of the Legion of Honour) and “Commendatore dell'Ordine della Stella d'Italia” (English: Order of the Star of Italy). He is the author of A Rip in the Sea: New Responsibilities for Business (2020), a book about his experiences in business and the new roles and responsibilities of business leaders. Bülent Eczacıbaşı is also an avid photographer, and in 2020, a selection of photographs he shot during his travels was published under the title "From the Road".

== Civic involvement ==
Eczacıbaşı has served at the senior level of prominent business associations, including the Turkish Industry and Business Association (TÜSİAD), where he was Chairman of the Board (1991–1993) and Chairman of the High Advisory Council (1997–2001), and the Turkish Pharmaceuticals Manufacturers Association (İEİS), where he was Chairman of the Board (2000–2008). He continues to serve both TÜSİAD and İEİS as Honorary Chairman. He is also an Honorary Member of the Foreign Economic Relations Board (DEİK) and the Turkish Enterprise and Business Confederation (TÜRKONFED), and a member of the High Advisory Council of the Aegean Industry and Business Association (ESİAD).

Additionally, Eczacıbaşı serves on the board of several major civic organizations. He is Chairman of the Board of Trustees of the Istanbul Modern Art Foundation, Chairman of the Board of Directors of the Istanbul Foundation for Culture and Arts (IKSV), and a member of the High Advisory Board of the Turkish Economic and Social Studies Foundation (TESEV), where he previously served as the Founding Chairman (1993–1997).
