= Füsun Eczacıbaşı =

- Born: Istanbul, Turkey
- Education: Kadıköy Maarif College; Istanbul Academy of Fine Arts
- Spouse: Faruk Eczacıbaşı

Füsun Eczacıbaşı (born Füsun Alpsoy) is an architect, art collector, and patron of the arts from Turkey. She is the co-founder and chairperson of the SAHA Association for the Arts.

== Personal history ==
Eczacıbaşı attended Kadıköy Maarif College and the Istanbul Academy of Fine Arts. She received her MSc in architecture in 1986.

Eczacıbaşı has been involved in many non-governmental organizations focusing on human rights, minority rights, nature preservation, and education. She is married to Faruk Eczacıbaşı, vice chairperson of Eczacıbaşı Holding, with whom she shares an enthusiasm for the arts. Their collection has been expanding since the late 1980s and focuses on contemporary art by emerging and established contemporary artists from Turkey and abroad. Füsun and Faruk Eczacıbaşı have two sons: Sinan (born in 1991) and Murat (born in 1995).

== Patron of the arts ==
Eczacıbaşı is co-founder and chair of the SAHA Association in Istanbul, a non-profit organization that supports contemporary art production. She describes the association, which celebrated its 10th anniversary in September 2021, as a place where philanthropists meet intending to show solidarity with the art community from Turkey.

She is Vice President of the Board of Trustees of the New Museum in New York City and Co-Chair of the New Museum International Leadership Council. Other art organizations she supports are the Global Patrons Council of Art Basel; International Companions of Hamburger Bahnhof in Berlin, the Board of Trustees of Athens Biennale, Tate International Council Advisory Board and Sculpture Center International Council.

In February 2022, the Madrid-based Callia Foundation awarded Eczacıbaşı the International Patron Award. The award is supported by Queen Sophia of Spain, who attended the ceremony and presented the awards.
