= Füsun Köksal =

Turkish composer

Füsun Köksal (born 1973) is a Turkish composer of contemporary classical music.

Köksal was born and grew up in Bursa, Turkey and attended Bilkent University's Faculty of Music and Performing Arts in Ankara from 1989 to 1996, where she earned her bachelor's degree in music theory and composition, studying under the supervision of Bujor Hoinic. From 1996 to 2002 she lived in Cologne, Germany, where she studied composition with Krzysztof Meyer and theory with Johannes Schild, earning a Diplom Musikerin from the Hochschule für Musik Köln. In 2002 she returned to Bilkent University, where she taught composition for three years. In 2004, she matriculated into the doctoral program at the University of Chicago, where she has studied with Marta Ptaszynska and Shulamit Ran. For the 2010–11 academic year she was Visiting Professor of Theory and Composition at the University of Pittsburgh. Her compositions have been performed worldwide by notable ensembles including the Ensemble Modern Academy, Ensemble Calliopée, Penderecki String Quartet, Arditti String Quartet, Pacifica Quartet, Eighthblackbird and Hezarfen Ensemble of Istanbul. Her oeuvre ranges from solo to orchestral works and is informed by the gestural and timbral concerns of e.g. Pierre Boulez, Luciano Berio. Köksal was assistant professor for music composition at Middlebury College and finally Associate Professor of Composition at Yaşar University İzmir.

== Honors ==
Köksal's honors include:

- Fulbright Visiting Scholar Fellowship, USA (2024)
- MacDowell Fellowship, USA (2023)
- Mario Merz Prize in Music, Italy (2022)
- Finalist at the Mario Merz Prize, Italy (2021)
- Civitella Ranieri Fellowship, USA-Italy (2018)
- Nominated for the Pablo Casals Festival Third International Composers Competition, France (2009)
- Third prize at the Sixth Concours International de Composition Henri Dutilleux (2008)
- Regional awards of the SCI/ASCAP Student Composition Competition (2006, 2007, 2008)
- Finalist at the Second International Composer's Competition, Reggello, Italy (2005)
- Second prize at the Third International Deutsche-Polnische Kompositions Wettbewerb, Köln (1998)
- Century Fellowship and Mellon Dissertation Year Fellowship (declined) from the University of Chicago

She has participated in master classes by Peter Eötvös, Salvatore Sciarrino, Augusta Read Thomas, and David Felder.

Her music has been performed throughout Europe and America at festivals such as the Fertile Crescent Festival (Institute of Advanced Studies, Princeton University), Young Composers in New Music (Detmold), Turkkfest (London), Toronto Summer Music Festival, Forum Neuer Musik (Cologne), June in Buffalo Festival, Centre Acanthes (Metz), Via Stellae Festival (Spain), the Schleswig-Holstein Music Festival (Germany), Warsaw Autumn Festival (Poland), MaerzMusik-Berliner Festspiele (Germany), Music Now! (Germany), and Tonedmelisma Musikfestival (Turkiye).

The prominent performers and ensembles who have featured her music include Derek Bermel, Benjamin Reissenberger, International Ensemble Modern Academy, Pacifica Quartet, eighth blackbird, Penderecki String Quartet, Ensemble Calliopée, Orchestre Nationale de Lorraine, Royal Liverpool Philharmonic Orchestra’s 10/10 Ensemble, Ensemble Fire-Wire, Dafô Quartet, Bilkent Symphony Orchestra, Hezarfen Ensemble, and Vertixe Sonora Ensemble, E-MEX Ensemble, Agata Igras, Cem Önertürk, Richard Haynes, Horia Dumitrache, and Ciompi String Quartet.

== Works ==
- Moire for two pianos and ensemble (2010–11)
- Horn Trio for violin, horn, and piano (2011)
- Six Pieces for two pianos (2010)
- Deux Visions for flute, clarinet, violin, cello, percussion, and piano (2009); also version for five instruments (2011)
- Five Miniatures for marimba (2009)
- Nocturnal for flute, violin, cello, and piano (2008)
- Three Songs for baritone, cello, and piano, text by Bertold Brecht (2008)
- Imaginary Spaces for chamber orchestra (2007)
- String Quartet No. 1 (2006–07)
- Around Circles for solo clarinet (2006)
- Fanfare for Wind Quintet for flute, oboe, clarinet in B-flat, trumpet in B-flat, and baritone saxophone (2005)
- Quartet for oboe and string trio (2002)
- Trio for violin, cello, and piano (2001)
- Four Pieces for string quartet (1998)
- Windows Suite for orchestra (1996)
