= Istanbul Modern =

- İstanbul Modern Sanat Müzesi
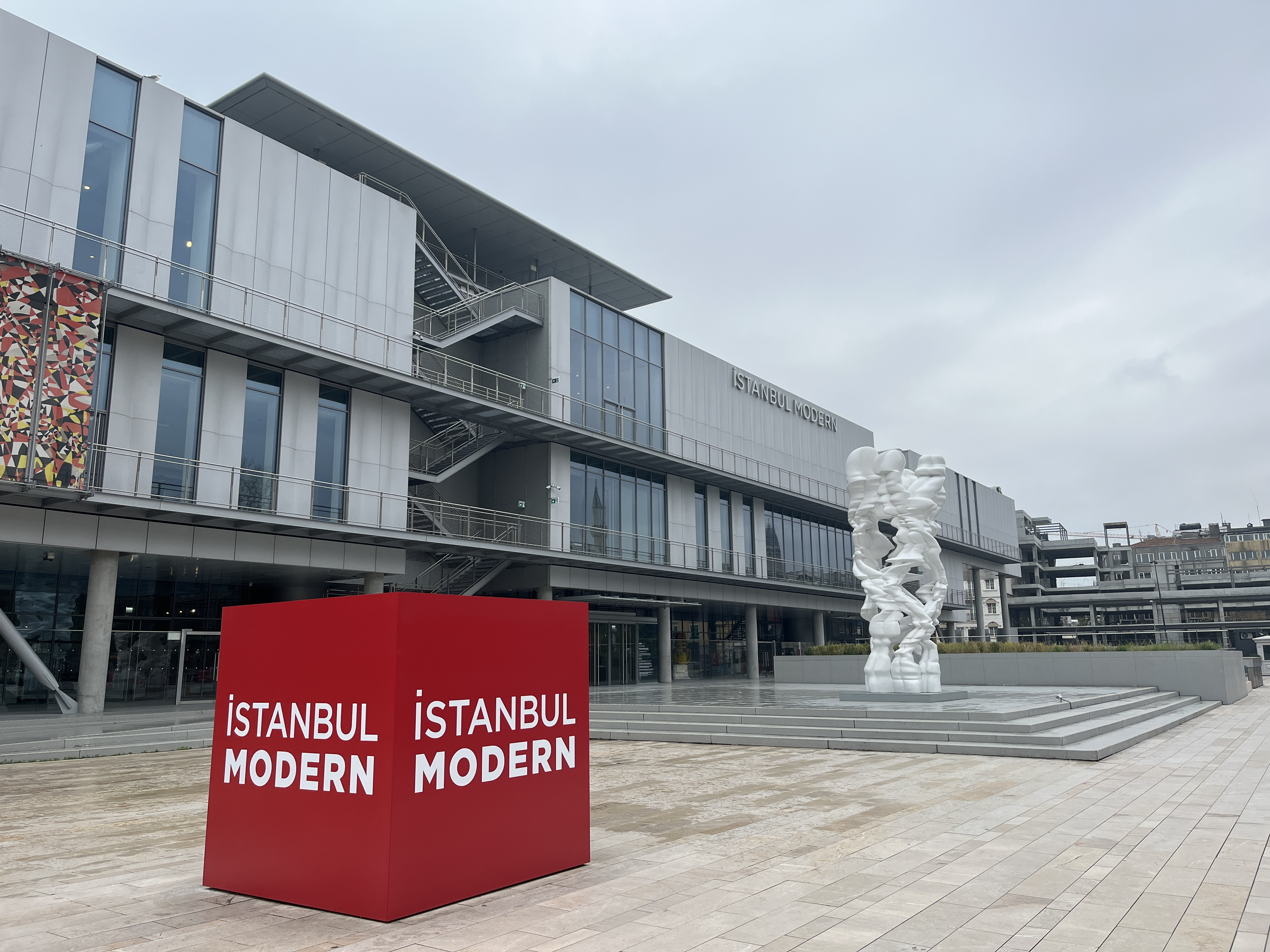
- Istanbul Modern, designed by Renzo Piano

- Location of Istanbul Modern
- Established: December 11, 2004; 21 years ago
- Location: Beyoğlu, Istanbul, Turkey
- Coordinates: 41.02660°N 28.98436°E
- Type: Contemporary art museum
- Chairperson: Oya Eczacıbaşı
- Architect: Renzo Piano
- Website: www.istanbulmodern.org

Istanbul Museum of Modern Art, colloquially referred to as Istanbul Modern (Turkish: İstanbul Modern Sanat Müzesi), is a contemporary art gallery located inside the Galataport complex in the Beyoğlu district of Istanbul, Turkey. Inaugurated on December 11, 2004, Istanbul Modern was Turkey's first modern and contemporary art gallery and focuses on Turkish as well as international artists. It is a private venture under the umbrella of the nonprofit Istanbul Foundation for Culture and Arts.

As of 2004, Oya Eczacıbaşı serves as chair of the board of directors.

== History ==
The journey of the Istanbul Museum of Modern Art, known as Istanbul Modern, or IMM, is deeply intertwined with the architectural and urban evolution of Istanbul. The museum's history is marked by its presence in three significant locations, each reflecting a different stage of its development and the changing cultural landscape of the city.

=== Search for a permanent home ===
The concept for a permanent museum dedicated to modern and contemporary art in Turkey was born from the vision of the Eczacıbaşı family, pioneers in the country's industrial and cultural sectors. Dr. Nejat F. Eczacıbaşı and his wife, Oya Eczacıbaşı, were inspired by the significant public interest generated by the 1st International Istanbul Contemporary Art Exhibitions in 1987, an event that would evolve into the prestigious Istanbul Biennial. Through their non-profit Istanbul Foundation for Culture and Arts (IKSV), founded in 1973, the family had already been instrumental in placing Istanbul on the international cultural map. Their first effort focused on transforming Feshane, a former 19th-century textile manufacturing factory on the Golden Horn, into a potential museum space by the architect of the Musée d’Orsay Gae Aulenti, which hosted the 3rd Istanbul Biennial in 1992. Following Dr. Nejat F. Eczacıbaşı's death in 1993, the project continued under the leadership of Oya Eczacıbaşı. In 2003, the progress resumed after the 8th Istanbul Biennial was staged in a former government customs warehouse located on the Galata Pier.

=== Entrepo No. 4: first permanent museum (2004–2018) ===
A breakthrough occurred when a customs warehouse on the Galata Pier, which had been used for the 8th Istanbul Biennial in 2003, was identified as a potential site. With the support of then-Prime Minister Recep Tayyip Erdoğan, a former government customs warehouse, Entrepo No. 4 in Tophane, was allocated for the museum. This 8,000-square-meter structure, originally built in the 1950s as part of a port modernization project, was situated in the historic Karaköy district on the Bosphorus shore.

With a $5 million investment from the Eczacıbaşı Group and Doğuş Group & Bilgili Holding, the former government customs warehouse in the Karaköy neighbourhood in 2004, was converted by the Turkish firm Tabanlıoğlu Architects. The design embraced a functional, minimalist aesthetic, transforming the industrial space into a modern cultural hub with expansive exhibition halls, a library, a cinema, and a restaurant. This period is often referred to as the museum's "loft phase," defined by the adaptive reuse of the industrial building.

Istanbul Modern was inaugurated in December 2004, becoming Turkey’s first museum of modern and contemporary art. The opening was strategically timed to coincide with the European Union summit meetings to discuss Turkey's potential accession, positioning the museum as a symbol of the nation's modern, European identity. The launch was a resounding success, attracting 17,500 visitors in its first week and half a million in its first year. It garnered extensive media coverage, both domestically and internationally, with publications like The New York Times and The Guardian highlighting it as the modern face of Turkey. For 14 years, Entrepo No. 4 served as a landmark institution, anchoring the city's emerging contemporary art scene. As part of the extensive Galataport urban regeneration project, which transformed the Karaköy waterfront, the original Entrepo No. 4 building was demolished.

=== Alexander Vallaury building (2018–2022) ===
From 2018 to 2022, Istanbul Modern relocated to a temporary historic building of the former Union Française in the Beyoğlu district designed by Alexander Vallaury in 1896.

=== New building by Renzo Piano (2023–Present) ===
On 4 May 2023, the museum reopened in a new, state-of-the-art building close to its original location in Karaköy designed by the world-renowned, Pritzker Prize-winning architect Renzo Piano. The choice of Piano, one of the architects of the iconic Centre Pompidou in Paris, was a deliberate move to elevate the museum to a world-class standard and reflected the museum's long-standing collaboration with the French institution since 2007. Piano envisioned the structure as a "flying vessel right on the water."The five-story, 10,500 m^{2} (113,000 sq ft) building offers various exhibition halls as well as educational workshops, a cinema, a library, a design shop, event spaces, and a café and restaurant.

Piano's design features a highly transparent ground floor that fosters a direct connection with the surrounding urban environment, including the renewed GalataPort promenade and Tophane Square. The museum also became integrated into the broader GalataPort development, an urban regeneration project that transformed the former cruise-ship port through adaptive reuse of existing restructures into cultural, commercial, and leisure spaces such as hotels, retail areas, cinemas, entertainment venues, and residential facilities.

The architecture emphasizes accessibility and public engagement, with a design that is deeply integrated with its specific location on the Bosphorus. This new building marks a new era for Istanbul Modern, moving from an adapted industrial space to a purpose-built architectural statement.

== Architectural features ==
=== Ground floor ===
The ground floor plan comprises two entry vestibules, one discovery space, two ticket desks, a library, and a restaurant. Piano chose the use of the rounded columns and mechanical funnels on the ground floor to create softer shadows with the aim of enhancing the visitor experience. A staircase situated at the center serves as the main circulation spine, organizing movement across the museum's three levels.

The facade of Istanbul Modern, composed of 300 gray, concave, and convex aluminum modules that Piano likened to "a fish leaping out of the water", serves as a dynamic element interacting with changing light and reflections from the Bosphorus. This design choice, along with the use of galvanized steel for the attached stairs and walkways, reminiscent of the site's industrial and maritime heritage.

=== First floor ===
The first floor, which contains galleries, event rooms, educational spaces, and a restaurant, features rhythmically repeated full-length windows that allow natural light and views of the exterior to penetrate the galleries. The galleries are designed as wide, high ceilinged spaces that can be adapted to accommodate a diverse range of artworks.

=== Second floor ===
The second floor is devoted to featuring exhibition galleries.

=== Rooftop ===
The rooftop terrace situated at the second floor offers panoramic views of Istanbul's historic peninsula and the Galata Tower. The terrace includes a 5 centimeter deep "Reflection Pool," which creates a visual extension of the Bosphorus by mirroring the sky and the surrounding cityscape. The materials used on the terrace are chosen to harmonize with the colors of Bosphorus. A covered pavilion and a terrace bar complete this public space, which serves as both an observatory and a leisure area.

== Collection ==
Istanbul Modern's collection serves to comprehensively represent modern and contemporary art in Turkey, with a particular focus on the period from 1950 onwards. The museum's holdings encompass a wide range of disciplines, including painting, sculpture, installation, photography, video, and new media. The core of the permanent collection was established with the private collection of the Eczacıbaşı family and is continually contributed through new acquisitions and donations.

To supplement its own holdings and provide a broader context for Turkish art, the museum collaborates with other institutions. It secures long-term loans from prominent collections, including those of the Istanbul Museum of Painting and Sculpture and Deutsche Bank. The Turkish bank, Türkiye İş Bankası, is another large source with its collection of 2,500 paintings.. Additionally, Istanbul Modern has borrowed historical artifacts and artworks from the Istanbul Metropolitan Municipality's Directorate of Libraries and Museums and the Military Museum at Harbiye to contextualize its contemporary displays.

The museum's collection and exhibition strategy aim to present a narrative of Turkish art that is both multicultural and authentic, highlighting the synthesis of Eastern traditions, such as the influence of Anatolian and Islamic culture in geometric and lyrical abstraction, with Western artistic movements like social realism and expressionism. The museum's collection includes significant works such as No. 5 (2011) by Turkish painter Kemal Önsoy.

== Exhibited artists ==
The Istanbul Modern is predominantly a gallery devoted to Turkish art since the latter half of the 20th century, although it does also include a few older works. Turkish art from its earliest days until the 20th century can be seen in the nearby Istanbul State Art and Sculpture Museum.

Major Turkish artists whose work can be seen at the Istanbul Modern include the following:

- Fahrelnissa Zeid
- Erol Akyavaş
- Nuri İyem
- Nejad Devrim
- Adnan Çoker
- Bedri Rami Eyüböglu
- Tayfun Erdoğmuş
- Semiha Berksoy
- Bedri Baykam
- Selma Gurbüz
- Yıldız Moran

Istanbul Modern also includes the work of a few international contemporary artists. Runner (2017), a white sculpture by Tony Cragg, greets visitors in front of the entrance.

== Controversy ==
In 2011, eight prominent artists pulled their work in response to claims the museum had rejected a piece by David “Bubi” Hayon for a charity auction. The work was a large seat with a bedpan in the middle, said to be a non-political criticism of the concept of museums.

== See also ==
- Istanbul Biennial
