= Faruk Eczacıbaşı =

Turkish businessperson

- Born: 1954 (age 71–72); Istanbul, Turkey
- Education: Deutsche Schule Istanbul; TU Berlin (BA, MBA)
- Occupation: Businessman
- Spouse: Füsun Eczacıbaşı
- Children: 2
- Parent(s): Nejat Eczacıbaşı; Fatma Beyhan Ergene

Faruk Eczacıbaşı (Turkish pronunciation: [faˈɾuk edʒzaːdʒɯbaˈʃɯ]; born 1954) is a Turkish businessman. With his brother Bülent Eczacıbaşı and other members of the Eczacıbaşı family he owns significant shareholding in the Eczacıbaşı. He is also the Vice Chairman of Eczacıbaşı Group as of 2018. He is a graduate of the Deutsche Schule Istanbul and Technische Universität Berlin's School of Management, where he earned his undergraduate and MBA degrees.

Eczacıbaşı began his professional career in 1980 in the Eczacıbaşı Group's planning department, after graduating from Technische Universität Berlin. Later in the decade, he assumed an instrumental role in the Group’s computerization and e-transformation processes as head of Eczacıbaşı Information and Communication Technologies. In 1996, he was appointed to his current post of Eczacıbaşı Group vice chairman.

Eczacıbaşı is also president of the Turkish Informatics Foundation (TBV), a non-governmental organization that he helped to found in 1995. TBV's mission is to assist in the transformation of Turkey into an information society through R&D, policy recommendations, and concrete projects. As president, Faruk Eczacıbaşı has played an active role in realizing many projects that have contributed to the foundation's strong standing among information and communication technology NGOs. TBV is currently focusing its efforts on improving the digital transformation processes in public sector institutions, monitoring private sector digitalization and their data arrangements, organizing technology and game-based educational activities for children and young people, advancing the presence of women in information technologies, and promoting collaboration on new technologies for the internet of things, smart city, blockchain and artificial intelligence (AI) among others.

Drawing on his experiences, Eczacıbaşı published a book in 2018 that analyzes the transformational changes taking place in Turkey and around the world as a result of new digital technologies. Entitled Daha Yeni Başlıyor (This Is Only the Beginning), the book considers how the accelerating pace of technological change is affecting individuals, institutions, societies and economies, and discusses ways to prepare for the positive and negative impacts of these changes.

Eczacıbaşı is also the president of the Eczacıbaşı Sports Club, a post he has held since 1999. During his term, the Eczacıbaşı Women’s Volleyball Team has won three European championships, two consecutive World Championships, and the International Olympic Committee’s Women and Sport World Trophy in 2018, for advancing the role of women in sports.
