= Turkish Economic and Social Studies Foundation =

Non-governmental think tank

The Turkish Economic and Social Studies Foundation (Turkish: Türkiye Ekonomik ve Sosyal Etüdler Vakfı, TESEV) is an Istanbul-based think tank that conducts research on social, political, and economic issues in Turkey. TESEV is an independent, non-governmental think tank that conducts research on social, political, and economic policy issues in Turkey. According to the Le Monde Diplomatique, the organization has been described as promoting liberal economic views that are critical of extensive state intervention.

The foundation, established in 1994 by more than two hundred academics, bureaucrats, businesspeople, executives, industrialists, journalists, trade union leaders and professionals, traces its origins to the Economic and Social Studies Conference Board (Turkish: Ekonomik ve Sosyal Etüdler Konferans Heyeti), founded in 1961 under the leadership of Nejat Eczacıbaşı.

By opening new channels for policy-oriented dialogue and research, TESEV aims to promote the role of civil society in the democratic process and seeks to share its research findings with the widest possible audience. In order to do so, TESEV organizes regular seminars and conferences, bringing together specialists and policymakers from Turkey and abroad to discuss issues of current concern. It releases project reports, books, pamphlets, policy watch briefings and seminar proceedings aimed at general readership.

TESEV focuses on the most urgent and important policy questions facing Turkey and its neighbourhood in the new century. Program areas are grouped under three headings: Democratization, Foreign Policy and Good Governance.

Some of the most remarkable of TESEV's work have been on the issues of Islam and democracy, combating corruption, state reform, and transparency and accountability. Among the ongoing project areas are security sector reform, minorities and citizenship rights, transparency and strengthening civil society as well as Cyprus, Middle East and North Africa, and Turkey and European Union relations.
