= Eczacıbaşı =

Turkish industrial group

Eczacıbaşı Holding A.Ş.
- Company type: Anonim Şirket
- Industry: Conglomerate
- Founded: 1942; 84 years ago
- Founder: Nejat Eczacıbaşı
- Headquarters: Levent, Istanbul
- Products: Building products, pharmaceuticals, consumer products
- Revenue: ▲€2 billion (2023)
- Total assets: ▲€3.48 billion (2023)
- Number of employees: 12,500
- Subsidiaries: Eczacıbaşı Yatırım Holding Ortaklığı A.Ş. BİST: ECZYT; EİS Eczacıbaşı İlaç, Sınai ve Finansal Yatırımlar Sanayi ve Ticaret A.Ş. BİST: ECILC
- Website: www.eczacibasi.com.tr

Eczacıbaşı Holding (Turkish pronunciation: [edʒzaːdʒɯbaˈʃɯ]) is a Turkish industrial group of companies founded in 1942. As of 2023, the Group's 50 companies employ more than 13,500 people, operate 40 production plants, and generate a combined net turnover of TL 33 billion.

The Eczacıbaşı offices at Kanyon, Istanbul designed by The Jerde Partnership & Tabanlıoğlu Architects

== Group ==
Eczacıbaşı's core sectors are building products, pharmaceuticals, consumer products and natural resources. Additionally, the group is active in finance, and real estate. Eczacıbaşı has nationwide distribution networks for pharmaceuticals, building products and fast-moving consumer goods. Internationally, Eczacıbaşı is known for its flagship VitrA brand, a contender in the global bathroom and tile markets. It is also an exporter of tissue paper, pharmaceuticals, and industrial raw materials such as clay, lead, zinc and feldspar.

International expansion is a central component of Eczacıbaşı Group's growth strategy. Over the last two decades, Eczacıbaşı has acquired a number of prominent international brands in its core business fields and established new plants for building products, tissue paper and radiopharmaceuticals in a variety of geographies. In 2022, revenue generated in markets outside of Turkey accounted for 59 percent of total sales.

== Founder ==
Dr. Nejat F. Eczacıbaşı (1913–1993), the founder of the Eczacıbaşı Group, used to say that "the real measure of private enterprise is its degree of success in raising the prosperity of society."

Süleyman Ferit Eczacıbaşı was the first university-educated pharmacist in the city of Izmir and had a long career of public service during the early years of the Turkish Republic. In 1909, the İzmir Provincial Congress gave him the title of "chief pharmacist" (Turkish: baş eczacı) With the introduction of the Surname Law in 1934, Süleyman Ferit adopted his title "Eczacıbaşı" as his family name.

Interior of Kanyon Mall, Istanbul

== Companies ==
- Building Products
  - Companies: Eczacıbaşı Building Products, VitrA Tiles, burgbad, V&B Fliesen GmbH (former tile division of Villeroy & Boch, İntema (BİST:INTEM)
  - Brands: VitrA, V&B, Artema, Burgbad, İntema
- Consumer Products
  - Eczacıbaşı Consumer Products (formerly İpek Kağıt Tissue Paper) was established in 1969 to manufacture bathroom tissue and promote its use in Turkey at a time when such products were considered luxury. They are Turkey's leading producer of toilet paper, the company has three main plants in the Marmara region and a fourth one in Manisa not far from Izmir. In 2022, the company stepped up its presence in the African market with the opening of a tissue paper plant in Casablanca, Morocco.
  - Brands: Selpak, Solo, Silen, Servis, Selin, Egos, Uni Med, Detan, Defans, Premax Unibaby, OK, Selpak Professional
- Healthcare
  - Gensenta
  - Eczacıbaşı Pharmaceuticals Marketing
  - Eczacıbaşı Monrol Nuclear Products
- Natural Resources
  - Esan
- Other Products and Services
  - Eczacıbaşı Investment Holding
  - Eczacıbaşı Pharmaceutical and Industrial Investment
  - Eczacıbaşı Information and Communication Technologies
  - Kanyon Management and Marketing
  - Ekom Eczacıbaşı Foreign Trade
  - Eczacıbaşı Property Development and Investments
  - Eczacıbaşı Insurance Agency

== Corporate social responsibility ==
=== Education ===
Hygiene Project for Primary Boarding Schools

The project aims to secure healthy environments for children at primary boarding schools. Spearheaded by three brands, VitrA, Artema and Eczacıbaşı Profesyonel, this social responsibility project is renovating the bathrooms and showers of Regional Primary Boarding School dormitories and school buildings with VitrA and Artema products. Within the Eczacıbaşı Group, companies and employees that are contributing to the success of the project include Eczacıbaşı Building Products, Eczacıbaşı Consumer Products, and Eczacıbaşı Volunteers. Partnering the project is the Ministry of Education, which is determining the neediest schools and ensuring they have the required plumbing infrastructure. The project has renovated the bathrooms and showers of 57 schools in 42 cities and provided healthy, high quality and hygienic educational environments to nearly 20 thousand students.

Selpak is organizing personal hygiene classes at primary schools all around Turkey. Between 2002 and 2022, more than 6 million students at primary schools in 60 cities have benefited this program.

The Eczacıbaşı Hygiene Project was the recipient of the International Public Relations Association's 2009 Golden World Award in Social Responsibility and an Honorable Mention in the associated Special United Nations’ Award competition. It also received two Honorable Mentions from the United States, one in the “Best Social Responsibility Project of Europe” category of the 2009 Stevie International Business Awards and the other in the “Community Relations” category of the PR News Platinum Awards.

Dr. Nejat F. Eczacıbaşı Foundation Music Scholarships

These scholarships enable outstanding young Turkish musicians to pursue graduate musical studies abroad. To date, the Foundation has provided financial support to 157 musicians studying instruments as well as orchestration, direction and composition.

Primary School Sponsorship

The Eczacıbaşı Group has built four primary schools for the Turkish public school system, to which it provides annual funding. Around 4200 students attend these schools.

Eczacıbaşı Sports School

The Eczacıbaşı Sports School teaches volleyball to young girls in the 6-12 age group.

Reproductive Health Hotline

In 2000, Eczacıbaşı Pharmaceuticals Marketing established a free, 24-hour reproductive health hotline (ALO-OKEY) with the Family Planning Association of Turkey. The aim of the hotline is to enhance public access to information about reproductive health.

=== Sports ===
The Eczacıbaşı Sports Club was founded in 1966 to introduce young people to sports and contribute to the development of sports in Turkey. In subsequent years, the club not only trained thousands of athletes, but it also played an important role in raising the quality of sports in Turkey to international levels. Today, The Eczacıbaşı Sports Club is focused exclusively on women's volleyball throughout the world.

The Eczacıbaşı Sports Club is home to the Eczacıbaşı Dynavit Women's Volleyball Team, the record-holder of Turkey's National Championships and first back-to-back Champion of the FIVB Women's Club World Championship (2015 and 2016). The team has won 28 National Championships, 9 National Cups and played in 12 European Cup Finals, winning the "European Cup Winner's Cup" in 1999. Winning its third straight Turkish Champions Cup title 2020, the team broke a new record by receiving as many as five titles recognizing player performance in the competition.

Over the years, the Eczacıbaşı Sports Club has trained countless women volleyball players at private high schools and universities. The club's "Future Spike" program, which it launched in 2016 in collaboration with the ES Volleyball Sports Club, aims to increase young girls' access to sports and encourage them to take up volleyball.

In 2018, the Eczacıbaşı Sports Club was awarded the International Olympic Committee's Women and Sports World Trophy for its success in international women's volleyball, for creating opportunities for thousands of young girls to play volleyball, and for striving to increase the presence of women in sports for over 50 tears.

=== Arts and Culture ===
Istanbul Museum of Modern Art

Eczacıbaşı Group is the founding sponsor of Turkey's first privately funded museum of modern art, to which it provided the initial investment and project management finance as well as the core collection of paintings. Istanbul Modern is committed to preserving and exhibiting Turkey's heritage of modern and contemporary art.

Using a combined chronological and thematic exhibition design of its permanent collection, Istanbul Modern showcases Turkish art through their foremost exponents. Additionally, the museum organizes retrospective exhibitions of Turkish modern masters and of internationally acclaimed artists. Istanbul Modern also organizes periodic exhibitions of photography, video and modern Turkish sculpture in addition to thematic film programs.

Since its foundation, the museum has hosted 8.5 million visitors and provided free art education to 850 thousand of children and young people.

Istanbul Modern's new building, situated at the museum's original location in Karaköy, in designed by Pritzker-winning architect Renzo Piano.

Istanbul Modern was included in The New York Times' 52 Places for Travelers to Visit in 2023 list.

Istanbul International Music, Film, Jazz, Theatre and Visual Art Festivals

The Eczacıbaşı Group is a supporter of the Istanbul International Festivals, both through its sponsorship of the Istanbul Foundation for Culture and Arts (İKSV), founded in 1973 on the initiative of Dr. Nejat F. Eczacıbaşı, and its direct patronage of festivals. In particular, the Eczacıbaşı Group's support of the Istanbul International Music Festival has contributed to its international prestige. Starting in 2006, Eczacıbaşı has become the leading sponsor of the Istanbul Foundation for Culture and Arts. In its new role, Eczacıbaşı Holding contributes to the International Istanbul Film Festival, Istanbul Theatre Festival and Istanbul Jazz Festivals as well as the Music Festival, enhancing its involvement in the foundation and broadening its communication with art lovers.

Eczacıbaşı Youth Ticket

In 2022, the Eczacıbaşı Group launched the Eczacıbaşı Youth Ticket Project to increase the interest of young people in art, and to enable them to meet with art more often. With the tickets offered to students for 10 TRY, young people are encouraged not only to access art events more easily but also to participate in life in a more intertwined way with art.

As part of Eczacıbaşı Youth Ticket at İKSV festivals, more than 40 thousand tickets were sold in nearly 600 different events in 2022. In 2023, the project continues to support the access of young audiences to the arts. In 2022, the project's communication campaign awarded the Felis Award in the social responsibility category and Curious Felis Gold Award in the creative strategy category.

VitrA Ceramic Arts Studio

Dr. Nejat F. Eczacıbaşı established the VitrA Ceramic Art Studio in 1957, with the goal of encouraging ceramic artists and public appreciation of this medium. Over the years, the VitrA Ceramic Arts Studio has opened its doors to talented ceramic artists, organized public exhibitions of their work and hosted master classes, conferences, slide shows and workshops on ceramic art. The VitrA Ceramic Arts Studio is a member of the Geneva-based International Academy of Ceramics (IAC).

Eczacıbaşı Photographers Series

The Eczacıbaşı Photographer Series carries on Eczacıbaşı Group's tradition of photography publications that started more than 50 years ago. Published by the Dr. Nejat F. Eczacıbaşı Foundation every year, the series focuses on one of Turkey's foremost photographic artists with a retrospective that preserves the artistic integrity of his or her work.

Eczacıbaşı Arts Encyclopedia

Published in 1997 by the Dr. Nejat F. Eczacıbaşı Foundation, the Eczacıbaşı Arts Encyclopedia is a three-volume work on international art and architecture that begins with pre-historic Anatolian cultures and focuses especially on the Byzantine, Seljuk, Beyliks, Ottoman and Republican periods in Turkey. About 250 researchers, writers, and university faculty worked on the project, which contains 4,400 articles.

== Public policy and scientific research ==
Eczacıbaşı Scientific Research and Medical Award Fund

Dr. Nejat F. Eczacıbaşı earnestly believed that the business world had a responsibility to support scientific research. As a business leader, he sought to contribute to the development of scientific research in Turkey and productive dialogue between the business world and academic institutions.

In 1959, Dr. Nejat F. Eczacıbaşı established an award program to recognize, support, and reward high-caliber medical research in Turkey. Presented every two years, the Dr. Nejat F. Eczacıbaşı Medical Awards has to date given out 35 Medical Science Awards, 44 Medical Incentive Awards, 18 Medical Students Project Awards and 179 Medical Research Awards for research projects. In 2022, a new award category was introduced: the Medical Award in Personalized Medicine.

Turkish Informatics Foundation

The Eczacıbaşı Group is a corporate sponsor of the Turkish Informatics Foundation, established in 1995 through the efforts of the Group's vice-chairman, Faruk Eczacıbaşı, also the foundation's current chairman. The foundation's main goal is to contribute to the development of the legal, technical and physical infrastructure required for Turkey's transition to an information-based society.

== See also ==
- Eczacıbaşı family
- Eczacıbaşı Sports Club
- Istanbul Foundation for Culture and Arts
- Istanbul Modern
- Turkish Economic and Social Studies Foundation
- List of companies of Turkey
