= Istanbul Foundation for Culture and Arts =

Cultural foundation in Turkey

- İstanbul Kültür Sanat Vakfı
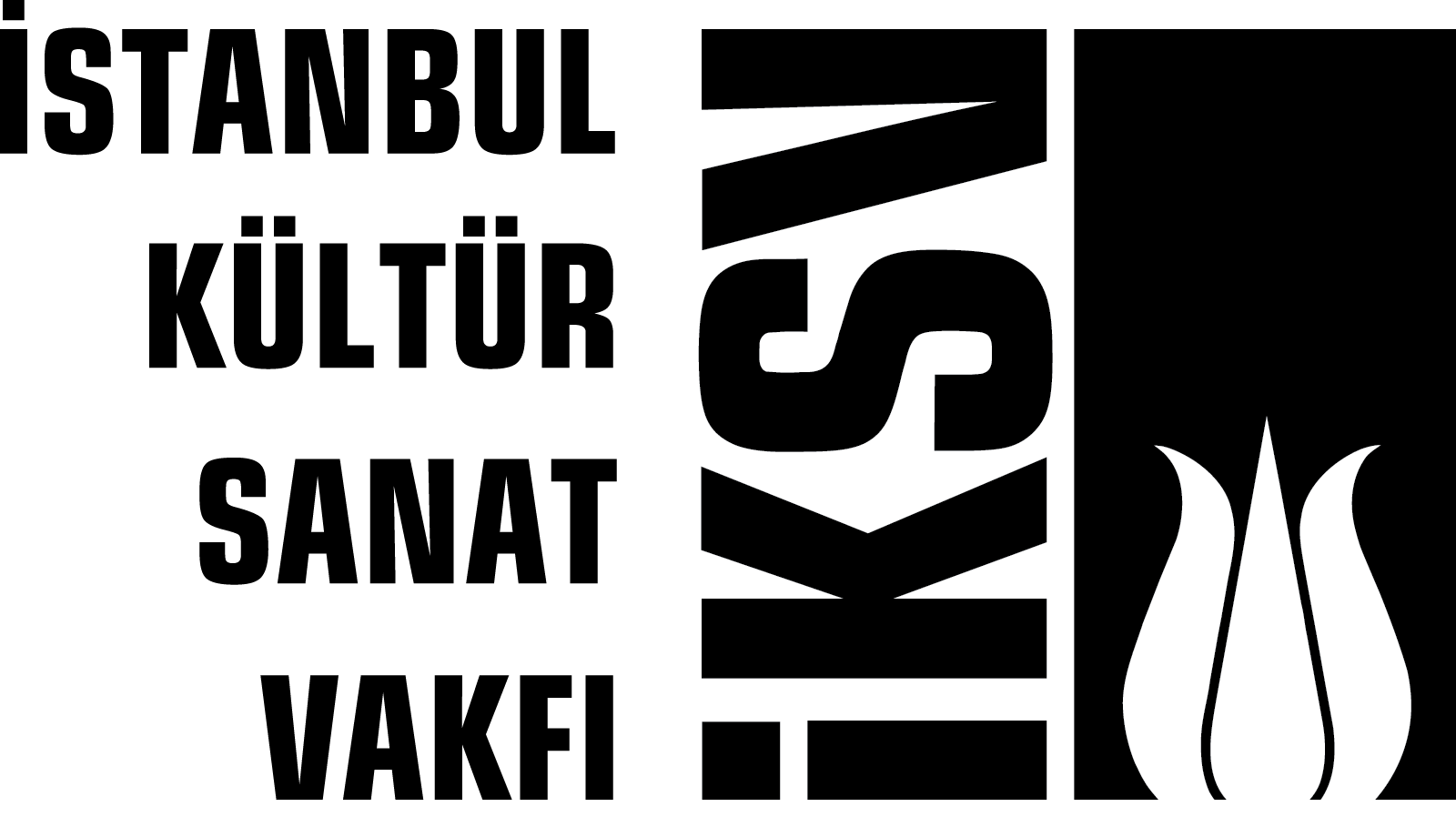

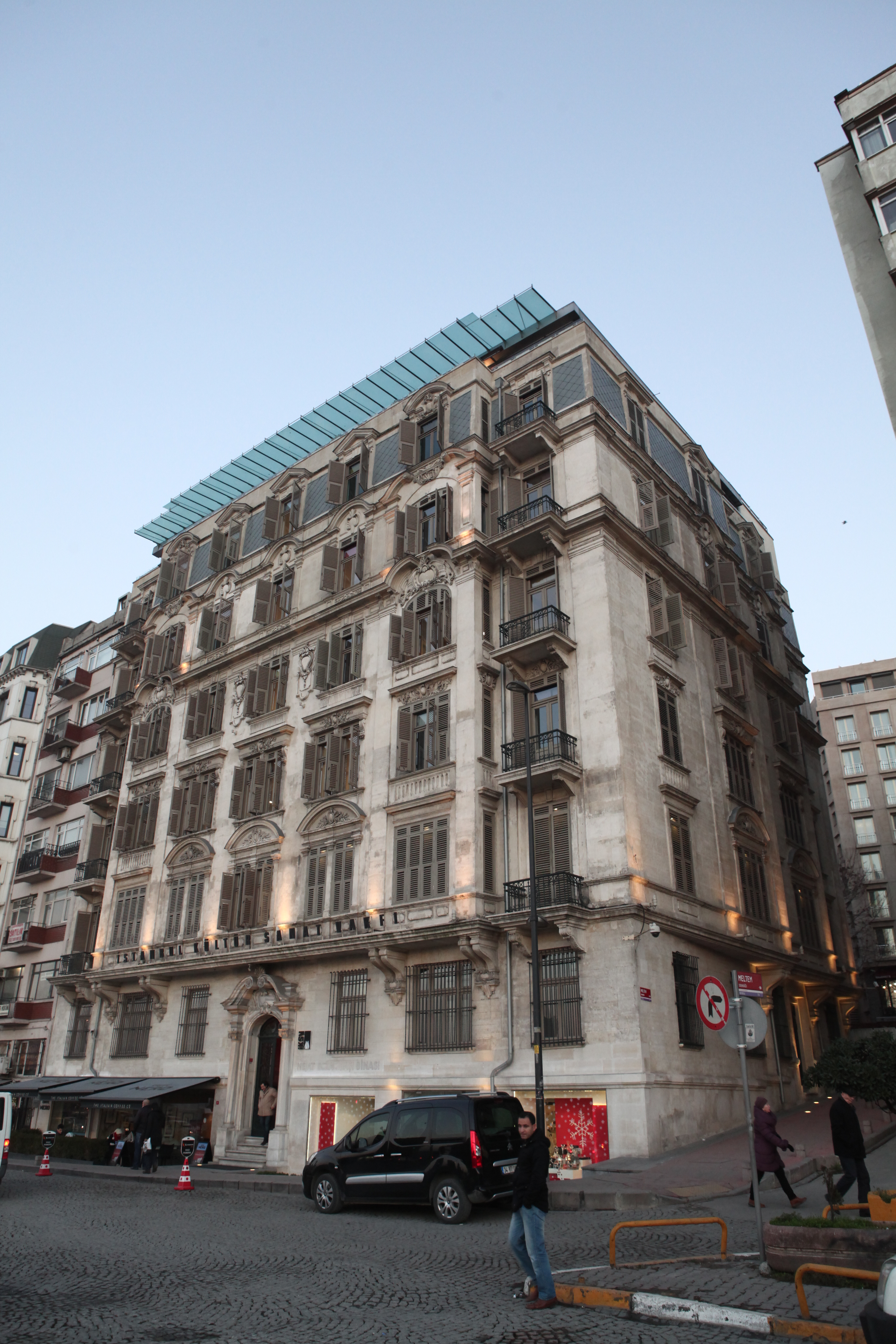
- İKSV Nejat Eczacıbaşı Building
- Abbreviation: İKSV
- Formation: 22 July 1972
- Type: Not-for-profit arts organization
- Legal status: Foundation
- Headquarters: Istanbul, Turkey
- Region served: Worldwide
- CEO: Bülent Eczacıbaşı
- Website: iksv.org

The Istanbul Foundation for Culture and Arts (Turkish: İstanbul Kültür Sanat Vakfı), abbreviated İKSV, is a not-for-profit arts organization based in Istanbul to promote classical music, theatre, jazz, and plastic arts. The İKSV was founded in 1972 by a joint venture of 17 businesspeople and art enthusiasts pioneered by Nejat F. Eczacıbaşı. Its establishment was funded by the Turkish government to engage in cultural framework for the 50th Anniversary of the Republic.

The goal of the foundation is described as turning Istanbul into a major center of international culture and arts. Since 1972, it has gradually expanded the scope of activities. Istanbul Film Festival, first held in 1982, is the biggest annual film festival in Turkey, featuring movies from all over the world at İKSV centres. International Istanbul Theatre Festival is another remarkable initiative by the foundation.

In 2009, it moved to Deniz Palas in Beyoğlu that is now renamed under the Nejat Eczacıbaşı Building. The first floor of the apartment hosts the Salon İKSV, the performance venue, where the foundation first-handly organizes concerts and art exhibitions.

== Regular events ==
- Istanbul Film Festival
- International Istanbul Theatre Festival
- Istanbul Music Festival
- Istanbul Jazz Festival
- Istanbul Biennial
- Istanbul Design Biennial
