= Nejat Eczacıbaşı =

Turkish entrepreneur (1919–1993)

Nejat F. Eczacıbaşı
- Born: January 5, 1913; Smyrna, Ottoman Empire
- Died: October 6, 1993 (aged 80); Philadelphia, Pennsylvania, US
- Resting place: Zincirlikuyu Cemetery
- Education: Robert College; Heidelberg University (BS); University of Chicago (MS); Humboldt University of Berlin (PhD); Kaiser Wilhelm Institute (Postdoc)
- Occupation: Businessman
- Organization: Eczacıbaşı Holding
- Spouse: Fatma Beyhan Ergene (1923–2004)
- Children: Bülent Eczacıbaşı; Faruk Eczacıbaşı
- Parent(s): Süleyman Ferit Eczacıbaşı (father); Saffet Hanım (mother)

Mehmet Nejat Ferit Eczacıbaşı (Turkish pronunciation: [mehˈmet neˈʒat feˈɾit edʒzaːdʒɯbaˈʃɯ]; January 5, 1913 – October 6, 1993) was a Turkish chemist, industrialist, entrepreneur and philanthropist. He was a second-generation member of the Turkish Eczacıbaşı family.

He was the founder of Eczacıbaşı, a Turkish industrial group with investments in pharmaceuticals, personal care products, consumer products, building products and financial services.

== Early life and education ==
He was born on January 5, 1913, in İzmir (then Smyrna), Ottoman Empire, to Süleyman Ferit Eczacıbaşı (1885–1973) and his wife Safet Hanım as their first of seven sons, Vedat (1916–1961), Sedat (1917 – c. 1950), Kemal (1918–1996), Haluk (1921–1996), Melih (1923–2004), Şerif (1929–2010). His father was the first university-educated pharmacist in the city of İzmir, who, while working at a hospital in his home town, was appointed "chief pharmacist" (Turkish: baş eczacı). The city council awarded him later in 1909 the honorific title "Eczacıbaşı" for his fruitful and successful work. Süleyman Ferit ran in later years his own pharmacy in İzmir. With the introduction of the Surname Law in 1934, Süleyman Ferit adopted his title "Eczacıbaşı" as family name.

Eczacıbaşı completed his primary and secondary education in İzmir. After finishing the high school at Robert College in Istanbul, he went on to study in chemistry at Heidelberg University. He made then his master's degree at Chicago University and his doctorate in 1937 at Berlin University. Nejat F. Eczacıbaşı conducted post-doctoral scientific works on hormones and vitamins at the Kaiser Wilhelm Institute in Germany. These studies contributed to Eczacıbaşı's scientific, systematic and universal approach to life and business, and reinforced his belief that the right to private enterprise ought to be tempered by social responsibility. This belief was first put forward by his father, whose maxim was "give back to your country what you take from it."

== Career ==
After returning home, he settled in Istanbul, and started in 1942 with the production of vitamin drugs and baby food in a small laboratory. In 1952, he founded the country's first modern pharmaceutical plant.

Between 1950 and 1990, he oversaw the expansion of the Eczacıbaşı Group's activities from pharmaceuticals to building materials, tissue paper, personal health care, capital markets, foreign trade and information technology. He became a major industrialist in branches such as pharmaceuticals, personal care products, consumer products, building products and financial services.

== Civic involvement and philanthropy ==
In addition to contributing to the development of Turkish industry, Eczacıbaşı sought to promote and assist the development of his country's civil society. His activities in this area included the establishment of educational institutions, professional business organisations, research institutes, cultural foundations and scholarship funds.

In 1954, he helped to found the Istanbul University Graduate School of Business (Turkish: İstanbul Üniversitesi İşletme İktisadı Enstitüsü), and the Turkish Management Association. In 1961, he established the Economic and Social Studies Conference Board, which would later become the Turkish Economic and Social Studies Foundation, one of the country's first independent strategic research institutes.

Eczacıbaşı was the first president of the Turkish Educational Foundation, established in 1966 to provide scholarships for university and graduate students. He was also a member of the Middle East Technical University's Board of Trustees during the 1960s and a member of the board of directors of the Turkish Scientific and Technical Research Institute in the 1970s. He was a principal founding member of the Turkish Industrialists' and Businessmen's Association (TÜSİAD).

Eczacıbaşı was one of the principal founders of the Istanbul Foundation for Culture and Arts (IKSV), which was established in 1973 on the 50th anniversary of the Republic Day. With the aim of transforming Istanbul into an "international capital of culture", the foundation initiated the annual International Istanbul Arts Festivals. Twenty years later, in recognition of the success of these festivals, UNESCO awarded the foundation the International Arts and Culture Trophy.

The Dr. Nejat F. Eczacıbaşı Foundation, established by him in 1978, provides scholarships for talented musicians, annual cinema and graphic arts awards and grants to public schools and institutes for scientific research. The foundation is also tasked with operating a publishing house and arts collection. The Eczacıbaşı Sports Club, established jointly by Nejat F. Eczacıbaşı and his brother Şakir Eczacıbaşı in 1966, has trained innumerable young athletes and won a significant number of national and international championships in volleyball, basketball and table tennis.

Eczacıbaşı was involved in initiatives aimed at improving living standards and supporting social development. Accounts of his work state that he sought to benefit future generations through his professional and philanthropic activities.

== Personal life and death ==
Eczacıbaşı married Fatma Beyhan (née Ergene) (1923–2004) in 1946. The couple had two sons, Bülent (1949) and Faruk (1954). Nejat F. Eczabaşıbaşı died on October 6, 1993, in Philadelphia, Pennsylvania, US; he went there for cataract surgery. His body was transferred to Istanbul, and was interred at the Zincirlikuyu Cemetery.

== Awards and accolades ==
He was honored in 1974 by the Council of Europe for the Istanbul Festival, which he co-founded. He was awarded the "Medal of Honor" by the Turkish Red Crescent in 1975, and the Order of Merit by the Federal Republic of Germany in 1976. The Turkish Chemistry Association honored him for his contribution to the industry in 1983.

== Bibliography ==
- Generation to Generation (1982)
- Experiences and Expectations (1994)

== See also ==
- Istanbul International Music Festival
