= 2018–19 Turkish Women's Volleyball League =

- League: Turkish Women's Volleyball League
- Sport: Volleyball
- Teams: 12

Regular Season
- Season champions: Eczacıbaşı VitrA

Finals
- Champions: VakıfBank Istanbul
- Runners-up: Eczacıbaşı VitrA
- Finals MVP: (China) Zhu Ting

Turkish Women's Volleyball League seasons
- ← 2017–18 2020–21 →

The 2018–19 Turkish Women's Volleyball League is the 36th edition of the top-flight professional women's volleyball league in Turkey.

== League table ==
Pos	Team	Pld	W	L	Pts	SW	SL	SR	SPW	SPL	SPR	Qualification
1	Eczacıbaşı VitrA	22	21	1	64.3	63	10	6.300	1781	1346	1.323	Play-offs
2	VakıfBank	22	21	1	62.44	64	11	5.818	1797	1405	1.279	Play-offs
3	Fenerbahçe	22	17	5	52.32	55	22	2.500	1835	1556	1.179	Play-offs
4	Galatasaray	22	13	9	44.34	49	34	1.441	1886	1704	1.107	Play-offs
5	Beşiktaş	22	10	12	34.46	42	45	0.933	1854	1908	0.972	Play-offs
6	Türk Hava Yolları	22	12	10	34.3	37	39	0.949	1660	1713	0.969	Play-offs
7	Nilüfer Belediye	22	12	10	31.46	40	45	0.889	1763	1858	0.949	Play-offs
8	İhtisas	22	10	12	30.06	37	46	0.804	1816	1847	0.983	Play-offs
9	Karayolları	22	7	15	22.5	32	55	0.582	1758	1978	0.889	Play-outs
10	Aydın Büyükşehir Belediyespor	22	6	16	21.3	32	50	0.640	1640	1839	0.892	Play-outs
11	Çanakkale Belediye	22	3	19	11.52	19	60	0.317	1567	1872	0.837	Play-outs
12	Halkbank	22	0	22	5.08	13	66	0.197	1582	1913	0.827	Play-outs

=== Results ===
Team	ECZ	VAK	FEN	GAL	BES	THY	NIL	IHT	KRY	ABB	CAN	HAL
Eczacıbaşı VitrA		3–1	3–0	3–1	3–0	3–0	3–1	3–1	3–0	3–1	3–0	3–0
VakıfBank	3–0		3–0	3–0	3–2	3–1	3–0	3–0	3–2	3–1	3–0	3–0
Fenerbahçe	0–3	2–3		3–0	3–0	3–0	2–3	3–0	3–0	3–0	3–0	3–0
Galatasaray	2–3	0–3	2–3		2–3	2–3	3–1	3–1	3–0	3–0	3–1	3–0
Beşiktaş	0–3	0–3	2–3	0–3		1–3	2–3	2–3	3–2	3–0	3–0	3–1
Türk Hava Yolları	0–3	0–3	0–3	0–3	3–1		3–0	3–0	3–0	3–1	3–2	3–1
Nilüfer Belediye	0–3	0–3	0–3	0–3	1–3	3–0		3–1	3–2	3–0	3–0	3–2
İhtisas	0–3	0–3	1–3	2–3	0–3	3–0	1–3		3–1	3–1	3–0	3–1
Karayolları	0–3	0–3	0–3	3–1	3–2	1–3	3–1	1–3		2–3	3–2	3–2
Aydın Büyükşehir Belediyespor	0–3	0–3	2–3	1–3	1–3	3–0	2–3	2–3	3–0		2–3	3–0
Çanakkale Belediye	0–3	0–3	0–3	0–3	1–3	0–3	1–3	1–3	2–3	0–3		3–0
Halkbank	0–3	0–3	0–3	1–3	1–3	0–3	2–3	1–3	0–3	0–3	1–3	

Source: http://tvf-web.dataproject.com/CompetitionStandings.aspx?ID=31&PID=69
Legend: Blue = left column team win; Yellow = draw; Red = top row team win.

=== Head-to-Head results ===
Team	ECZ	VAK	FEN	GAL	BES	THY	NIL	IHT	KRY	ABB	CAN	HAL
Eczacıbaşı VitrA		1–1	2–0	2–0	2–0	2–0	2–0	2–0	2–0	2–0	2–0	2–0
VakıfBank	1–1		2–0	2–0	2–0	2–0	2–0	2–0	2–0	2–0	2–0	2–0
Fenerbahçe	0–2	0–2		2–0	2–0	2–0	1–1	2–0	2–0	2–0	2–0	2–0
Galatasaray	0–2	0–2	0–2		1–1	1–1	2–0	2–0	1–1	2–0	2–0	2–0
Beşiktaş	0–2	0–2	0–2	1–1		0–2	1–1	1–1	1–1	2–0	2–0	2–0
Türk Hava Yolları	0–2	0–2	0–2	1–1	2–0		1–1	1–1	2–0	1–1	2–0	2–0
Nilüfer Belediye	0–2	0–2	1–1	0–2	1–1	1–1		2–0	1–1	2–0	2–0	2–0
İhtisas	0–2	0–2	0–2	0–2	1–1	1–1	0–2		2–0	2–0	2–0	2–0
Karayolları	0–2	0–2	0–2	1–1	1–1	0–2	1–1	0–2		0–2	2–0	2–0
Aydın Büyükşehir Belediyespor	0–2	0–2	0–2	0–2	0–2	1–1	0–2	0–2	2–0		1–1	2–0
Çanakkale Belediye	0–2	0–2	0–2	0–2	0–2	0–2	0–2	0–2	0–2	1–1		2–0
Halkbank	0–2	0–2	0–2	0–2	0–2	0–2	0–2	0–2	0–2	0–2	0–2	

Source: http://tvf-web.dataproject.com/CompetitionStandings.aspx?ID=31&PID=69
Legend: Blue = left column team win; Yellow = draw; Red = top row team win.

== Statistics ==
=== League stage ===
Wing-Spiker
Rank	Player	Club	%
1	(Mexico) Samantha Bricio	Fenerbahçe	0.32361
2	(China) Zhu Ting	VakıfBank	0.31448
3	(United States) Simone Lee	İhtisas	0.28968
4	(United States) Kelsey Robinson	VakıfBank	0.27222
5	(Canada) Autumn Bailey	Nilüfer Belediye	0.26798

Opposite
Rank	Player	Club	%
1	(Cuba) Melissa Vargas	Fenerbahçe	0.64493
2	(Ukraine) Olesia Rykhliuk	Beşiktaş	0.55934
3	(United States) Andrea Drews	İhtisas	0.54806
4	(Azerbaijan) Polina Rahimova	Türk Hava Yolları	0.53516
5	(Ukraine) Oleksandra Bytsenko	Nilüfer Belediye	0.48483

Middle-Blocker
Rank	Player	Club	%
1	(Serbia) Milena Rašić	Vakıfbank	0.66969
2	(Turkey) Eda Erdem Dündar	Fenerbahçe	0.65212
3	(Turkey) Aslı Kalaç	Galatasaray	0.6184
4	(Turkey) Ergül Eroğlu	İhtisas	0.59545
5	(Turkey) Zehra Güneş	Vakıfbank	0.57817

Setter
Rank	Player	Club	%
1	(Turkey) Sıla Çalışkan	Fenerbahçe	56.52
2	(Turkey) Cansu Özbay	VakıfBank	42.17
3	(Turkey) Buket Gülübay	VakıfBank	42.00
4	(Serbia) Ana Antonijević	Fenerbahçe	41.48
5	(Turkey) Ezgi Dilik	Eczacıbaşı VitrA	40.63

Libero
Rank	Player	Club	%
1	(Turkey) Simge Şebnem Aköz	Eczacıbaşı VitrA	0.30338
2	(Turkey) Funda Bilgi	Türk Hava Yolları	0.30335
3	(Turkey) Aylin Sarıoğlu	Nilüfer Belediye	0.30313
4	(Turkey) Berin Yıldırım	Türk Hava Yolları	0.30311
5	(Turkey) Gizem Karadayı	Galatasaray	0.3031

== Results ==
=== Week 1 ===
Date	Time		Score		Set 1	Set 2	Set 3	Set 4	Set 5	Total	Report
2 Nov	17:00	Fenerbahçe	3–0	Beşiktaş	27–25	25–20	27–25	-	-	79–70	Report
3 Nov	16:00	Halkbank	1–3	İhtisas	25–23	16–25	9–25	18–25	-	68–98	Report
3 Nov	15:00	Aydın Büyükşehir Belediyespor	3–0	Türk Hava Yolları	25–22	25–20	25–22	-	-	75–64	Report
3 Nov	17:30	Nilüfer Belediye	0–3	Eczacıbaşı VitrA	14–25	12–25	12–25	-	-	38–75	Report
3 Nov	14:00	Galatasaray	3–1	Çanakkale Belediye	25–21	23–25	25–18	25–21	-	98–85	Report
3 Nov	14:00	VakıfBank	3–2	Karayolları	23–25	25–15	29–31	25–13	15–6	117–90	Report

=== Week 2 ===
Date	Time		Score		Set 1	Set 2	Set 3	Set 4	Set 5	Total	Report
6 Nov	17:30	Karayolları	3–1	Galatasaray	15–25	25–21	26–24	25–22	-	91–92	Report
6 Nov	18:00	Çanakkale Belediye	0–3	Aydın Büyükşehir Belediyespor	15–25	19–25	26–28	-	-	60–78	Report
6 Nov	18:00	İhtisas	1–3	Fenerbahçe	32–34	18–25	25–21	16–25	-	91–105	Report
6 Nov	15:00	Türk Hava Yolları	3–0	Nilüfer Belediye	26–24	25–13	25–18	-	-	76–55	Report
6 Nov	18:00	Beşiktaş	0–3	VakıfBank	18–25	11–25	18–25	-	-	47–75	Report
6 Nov	18:30	Eczacıbaşı VitrA	3–0	Halkbank	25–12	25–10	25–17	-	-	75–39	Report

=== Week 3 ===
Date	Time		Score		Set 1	Set 2	Set 3	Set 4	Set 5	Total	Report
9 Nov	18:00	İhtisas	0–3	Eczacıbaşı VitrA	16–25	20–25	12–25	-	-	48–75	Report
10 Nov	16:00	Halkbank	0–3	Türk Hava Yolları	23–25	21–25	17–25	-	-	61–75	Report
10 Nov	15:00	Aydın Büyükşehir Belediyespor	3–0	Karayolları	25–15	25–21	25–13	-	-	75–49	Report
10 Nov	17:30	Nilüfer Belediye	3–0	Çanakkale Belediye	25–18	25–15	25–20	-	-	75–53	Report
10 Nov	13:30	Galatasaray	2–3	Beşiktaş	15–25	23–25	25–18	25–18	12–15	100–101	Report
10 Nov	17:00	Fenerbahçe	2–3	VakıfBank	18–25	25–21	25–20	21–25	14–16	103–107	Report

=== Week 4 ===
Date	Time		Score		Set 1	Set 2	Set 3	Set 4	Set 5	Total	Report
13 Nov	18:00	Karayolları	3–1	Nilüfer Belediye	21–25	25–21	25–20	25–13	-	96–79	Report
13 Nov	18:00	Çanakkale Belediye	3–0	Halkbank	25–21	25–21	27–25	-	-	77–67	Report
13 Nov	15:00	Türk Hava Yolları	3–0	İhtisas	29–27	25–20	25–23	-	-	79–70	Report
13 Nov	19:00	Eczacıbaşı VitrA	3–0	Fenerbahçe	26–24	27–25	26–24	-	-	79–73	Report
14 Nov	18:00	VakıfBank	3–0	Galatasaray	25–23	25–18	25–18	-	-	75–59	Report
21 Nov	14:00	Beşiktaş	3–0	Aydın Büyükşehir Belediyespor	25–22	25–23	25–14	-	-	75–59	Report

=== Week 5 ===
Date	Time		Score		Set 1	Set 2	Set 3	Set 4	Set 5	Total	Report
16 Nov	19:00	Eczacıbaşı VitrA	3–0	Türk Hava Yolları	25–14	25–21	25–23	-	-	75–58	Report
17 Nov	16:00	Halkbank	0–3	Karayolları	24–26	23–25	27–29	-	-	74–80	Report
17 Nov	15:00	Aydın Büyükşehir Belediyespor	0–3	VakıfBank	13–25	18–25	21–25	-	-	52–75	Report
17 Nov	16:00	İhtisas	3–0	Çanakkale Belediye	26–24	26–24	25–20	-	-	77–68	Report
17 Nov	14:00	Fenerbahçe	3–0	Galatasaray	25–19	25–16	28–26	-	-	78–61	Report
18 Nov	17:30	Nilüfer Belediye	1–3	Beşiktaş	25–23	18–25	19–25	15–25	-	77–98	Report

=== Week 6 ===
Date	Time		Score		Set 1	Set 2	Set 3	Set 4	Set 5	Total	Report
24 Nov	16:00	Karayolları	1–3	İhtisas	25–16	14–25	18–25	17–25	-	74–91	Report
24 Nov	17:00	Çanakkale Belediye	0–3	Eczacıbaşı VitrA	24–26	11–25	21–25	-	-	56–76	Report
24 Nov	15:00	Galatasaray	3–0	Aydın Büyükşehir Belediyespor	25–17	25–17	25–15	-	-	75–49	Report
24 Nov	18:00	Beşiktaş	3–1	Halkbank	28–26	15–25	25–21	25–20	-	93–92	Report
24 Nov	14:00	VakıfBank	3–0	Nilüfer Belediye	25–14	25–20	25–20	-	-	75–54	Report
25 Nov	16:30	Türk Hava Yolları	0–3	Fenerbahçe	21–25	23–25	17–25	-	-	61–75	Report

=== Week 7 ===
Date	Time		Score		Set 1	Set 2	Set 3	Set 4	Set 5	Total	Report
28 Nov	16:00	Eczacıbaşı VitrA	3–0	Karayolları	25–23	25–17	25–23	-	-	75–63	Report
29 Nov	13:00	Halkbank	0–3	VakıfBank	18–25	12–25	21–25	-	-	51–75	Report
1 Dec	17:30	Nilüfer Belediye	0–3	Galatasaray	23–25	24–26	19–25	-	-	66–76	Report
1 Dec	16:00	İhtisas	0–3	Beşiktaş	21–25	21–25	17–25	-	-	59–75	Report
1 Dec	14:00	Türk Hava Yolları	3–2	Çanakkale Belediye	25–16	21–25	25–21	23–25	15–12	109–99	Report
1 Dec	17:00	Fenerbahçe	3–0	Aydın Büyükşehir Belediyespor	25–15	25–20	27–25	-	-	77–60	Report

=== Week 8 ===
Date	Time		Score		Set 1	Set 2	Set 3	Set 4	Set 5	Total	Report
27 Nov	19:00	VakıfBank	3–0	İhtisas	25–17	25–15	25–20	-	-	75–52	Report
8 Dec	16:00	Karayolları	1–3	Türk Hava Yolları	25–20	18–25	17–25	19–25	-	79–95	Report
8 Dec	15:00	Aydın Büyükşehir Belediyespor	2–3	Nilüfer Belediye	25–19	20–25	25–15	15–25	7–15	92–99	Report
8 Dec	14:00	Çanakkale Belediye	0–3	Fenerbahçe	17–25	17–25	19–25	-	-	53–75	Report
8 Dec	14:00	Galatasaray	3–0	Halkbank	25–19	25–19	25–11	-	-	75–49	Report
28 Dec	18:00	Beşiktaş	0–3	Eczacıbaşı VitrA	16–25	16–25	17–25	-	-	49–75	Report

=== Week 9 ===
Date	Time		Score		Set 1	Set 2	Set 3	Set 4	Set 5	Total	Report
14 Dec	18:00	İhtisas	2–3	Galatasaray	35–33	20–25	25–22	18–25	7–15	105–120	Report
14 Dec	18:00	Fenerbahçe	2–3	Nilüfer Belediye	20–25	25–23	22–25	25–14	12–15	104–102	Report
15 Dec	16:00	Halkbank	0–3	Aydın Büyükşehir Belediyespor	23–25	21–25	20–25	-	-	64–75	Report
15 Dec	14:00	Çanakkale Belediye	2–3	Karayolları	27–25	20–25	19–25	25–18	11–15	102–108	Report
15 Dec	16:30	Eczacıbaşı VitrA	3–1	VakıfBank	25–21	25–13	20–25	25–20	-	95–79	Report
15 Dec	19:00	Türk Hava Yolları	3–1	Beşiktaş	25–19	25–23	18–25	25–22	-	93–89	Report

=== Week 10 ===
Date	Time		Score		Set 1	Set 2	Set 3	Set 4	Set 5	Total	Report
22 Dec	14:00	Karayolları	0–3	Fenerbahçe	17–25	14–25	17–25	-	-	48–75	Report
22 Dec	15:00	Aydın Büyükşehir Belediyespor	2–3	İhtisas	25–17	12–25	25–23	15–25	6–15	83–105	Report
22 Dec	17:30	Nilüfer Belediye	3–2	Halkbank	23–25	25–19	19–25	25–22	18–16	110–107	Report
22 Dec	14:00	Galatasaray	2–3	Eczacıbaşı VitrA	15–25	22–25	25–20	25–21	16–18	103–109	Report
22 Dec	17:00	Beşiktaş	3–0	Çanakkale Belediye	25–18	30–28	25–18	-	-	80–64	Report
22 Dec	19:00	VakıfBank	3–1	Türk Hava Yolları	25–17	25–18	20–25	25–14	-	95–74	Report

=== Week 11 ===
Date	Time		Score		Set 1	Set 2	Set 3	Set 4	Set 5	Total	Report
24 Dec	14:00	Çanakkale Belediye	0–3	VakıfBank	20–25	16–25	21–25	-	-	57–75	Report
24 Dec	17:00	Fenerbahçe	3–0	Halkbank	25–12	25–12	25–17	-	-	75–41	Report
25 Dec	18:00	Karayolları	3–2	Beşiktaş	26–24	25–23	23–25	23–25	15–12	112–109	Report
25 Dec	18:00	İhtisas	1–3	Nilüfer Belediye	23–25	25–20	21–25	17–25	-	86–95	Report
25 Dec	19:30	Türk Hava Yolları	0–3	Galatasaray	22–25	19–25	17–25	-	-	58–75	Report
25 Dec	14:00	Eczacıbaşı VitrA	3–1	Aydın Büyükşehir Belediyespor	25–6	25–18	20–25	25–11	-	95–60	Report

=== Week 12 ===
Date	Time		Score		Set 1	Set 2	Set 3	Set 4	Set 5	Total	Report
12 Jan	14:00	Beşiktaş	2–3	Fenerbahçe	14–25	25–20	19–25	25–23	11–15	94–108	Report
13 Jan	16:00	Karayolları	0–3	VakıfBank	17–25	21–25	25–27	-	-	63–77	Report
13 Jan	17:00	Çanakkale Belediye	0–3	Galatasaray	7–25	11–25	16–25	-	-	34–75	Report
13 Jan	16:00	İhtisas	3–1	Halkbank	25–19	25–22	23–25	26–24	-	99–90	Report
13 Jan	18:00	Türk Hava Yolları	3–1	Aydın Büyükşehir Belediyespor	27–29	25–20	25–13	29–27	-	106–89	Report
13 Jan	18:30	Eczacıbaşı VitrA	3–1	Nilüfer Belediye	22–25	25–18	25–15	25–23	-	97–81	Report

=== Week 13 ===
Date	Time		Score		Set 1	Set 2	Set 3	Set 4	Set 5	Total	Report
16 Jan	19:30	Halkbank	0–3	Eczacıbaşı VitrA	14–25	15–25	15–25	-	-	44–75	Report
16 Jan	18:00	Aydın Büyükşehir Belediyespor	2–3	Çanakkale Belediye	23–25	25–14	25–11	19–25	12–15	104–90	Report
16 Jan	17:30	Nilüfer Belediye	3–0	Türk Hava Yolları	25–17	25–23	25–17	-	-	75–57	Report
16 Jan	14:00	Galatasaray	3–0	Karayolları	25–12	25–15	25–20	-	-	75–47	Report
16 Jan	19:00	Fenerbahçe	3–0	İhtisas	25–21	25–20	25–22	-	-	75–63	Report
16 Jan	17:00	VakıfBank	3–2	Beşiktaş	18–25	25–14	25–20	16–25	15–9	99–93	Report

=== Week 14 ===
Date	Time		Score		Set 1	Set 2	Set 3	Set 4	Set 5	Total	Report
19 Jan	14:00	Beşiktaş	0–3	Galatasaray	23–25	15–25	17–25	-	-	55–75	Report
19 Jan	18:30	Eczacıbaşı VitrA	3–1	İhtisas	24–26	25–13	25–17	25–20	-	99–76	Report
20 Jan	16:00	Karayolları	2–3	Aydın Büyükşehir Belediyespor	16–25	19–25	25–23	27–25	13–15	100–113	Report
20 Jan	17:00	Türk Hava Yolları	3–1	Halkbank	25–17	25–17	23–25	25–23	-	98–82	Report
20 Jan	14:00	VakıfBank	3–0	Fenerbahçe	25–20	25–23	25–23	-	-	75–66	Report
21 Jan	18:00	Çanakkale Belediye	1–3	Nilüfer Belediye	25–22	22–25	22–25	22–25	-	91–97	Report

=== Week 15 ===
Date	Time		Score		Set 1	Set 2	Set 3	Set 4	Set 5	Total	Report
27 Jan	16:00	Halkbank	1–3	Çanakkale Belediye	21–25	25–17	21–25	19–25	-	86–92	Report
27 Jan	15:00	Aydın Büyükşehir Belediyespor	1–3	Beşiktaş	25–22	22–25	15–25	18–25	-	80–97	Report
27 Jan	17:30	Nilüfer Belediye	3–2	Karayolları	25–20	25–21	24–26	12–25	15–12	101–104	Report
27 Jan	16:00	İhtisas	3–0	Türk Hava Yolları	25–18	25–21	32–30	-	-	82–69	Report
27 Jan	14:00	Galatasaray	0–3	VakıfBank	21–25	12–25	20–25	-	-	53–75	Report
27 Jan	18:30	Fenerbahçe	0–3	Eczacıbaşı VitrA	22–25	29–31	23–25	-	-	74–81	Report

=== Week 16 ===
Date	Time		Score		Set 1	Set 2	Set 3	Set 4	Set 5	Total	Report
30 Jan	19:30	Karayolları	3–2	Halkbank	16–25	27–25	22–25	25–18	15–11	105–104	Report
30 Jan	18:00	Çanakkale Belediye	1–3	İhtisas	23–25	13–25	31–29	15–25	-	82–104	Report
30 Jan	13:30	Galatasaray	2–3	Fenerbahçe	25–27	15–25	25–23	25–20	13–15	103–110	Report
30 Jan	15:30	Türk Hava Yolları	0–3	Eczacıbaşı VitrA	10–25	15–25	19–25	-	-	44–75	Report
30 Jan	17:00	VakıfBank	3–1	Aydın Büyükşehir Belediyespor	25–22	25–14	23–25	25–11	-	98–72	Report
31 Jan	14:00	Beşiktaş	2–3	Nilüfer Belediye	25–23	25–15	25–27	15–25	8–15	98–105	Report

=== Week 17 ===
Date	Time		Score		Set 1	Set 2	Set 3	Set 4	Set 5	Total	Report
2 Feb	18:30	Eczacıbaşı VitrA	3–0	Çanakkale Belediye	25–22	25–21	25–16	-	-	75–59	Report
3 Feb	16:00	Halkbank	1–3	Beşiktaş	18–25	22–25	25–20	28–30	-	93–100	Report
3 Feb	15:00	Aydın Büyükşehir Belediyespor	1–3	Galatasaray	25–18	18–25	19–25	18–25	-	80–93	Report
3 Feb	17:30	Nilüfer Belediye	0–3	VakıfBank	20–25	19–25	16–25	-	-	55–75	Report
3 Feb	16:00	İhtisas	3–1	Karayolları	21–25	25–16	25–18	25–20	-	96–79	Report
3 Feb	14:00	Fenerbahçe	3–0	Türk Hava Yolları	25–15	25–18	25–18	-	-	75–51	Report

=== Week 18 ===
Date	Time		Score		Set 1	Set 2	Set 3	Set 4	Set 5	Total	Report
9 Feb	18:30	Galatasaray	3–1	Nilüfer Belediye	25–21	20–25	25–9	25–15	-	95–70	Report
10 Feb	16:00	Karayolları	0–3	Eczacıbaşı VitrA	16–25	14–25	22–25	-	-	52–75	Report
10 Feb	15:00	Aydın Büyükşehir Belediyespor	2–3	Fenerbahçe	19–25	25–17	11–25	28–26	9–15	92–108	Report
10 Feb	17:00	Çanakkale Belediye	0–3	Türk Hava Yolları	21–25	22–25	17–25	-	-	60–75	Report
10 Feb	14:00	Beşiktaş	2–3	İhtisas	25–21	17–25	25–23	18–25	11–15	96–109	Report
10 Feb	14:00	VakıfBank	3–0	Halkbank	25–19	25–16	25–16	-	-	75–51	Report

=== Week 19 ===
Date	Time		Score		Set 1	Set 2	Set 3	Set 4	Set 5	Total	Report
17 Feb	14:00	Halkbank	1–3	Galatasaray	30–32	20–25	25–20	28–30	-	103–107	Report
17 Feb	17:30	Nilüfer Belediye	3–0	Aydın Büyükşehir Belediyespor	25–18	25–18	25–20	-	-	75–56	Report
17 Feb	16:00	İhtisas	0–3	VakıfBank	17–25	17–25	21–25	-	-	55–75	Report
17 Feb	15:00	Fenerbahçe	3–0	Çanakkale Belediye	25–15	25–19	25–21	-	-	75–55	Report
17 Feb	17:30	Türk Hava Yolları	3–0	Karayolları	25–18	25–21	28–26	-	-	78–65	Report
17 Feb	17:00	Eczacıbaşı VitrA	3–0	Beşiktaş	25–19	25–16	25–19	-	-	75–54	Report

=== Week 20 ===
Date	Time		Score		Set 1	Set 2	Set 3	Set 4	Set 5	Total	Report
23 Feb	13:00	Aydın Büyükşehir Belediyespor	3–0	Halkbank	25–20	26–24	25–19	-	-	76–63	Report
23 Feb	17:30	Nilüfer Belediye	0–3	Fenerbahçe	16–25	21–25	20–25	-	-	57–75	Report
23 Feb	19:00	Galatasaray	3–1	İhtisas	25–14	21–25	25–17	25–21	-	96–77	Report
23 Feb	14:00	VakıfBank	3–0	Eczacıbaşı VitrA	25–21	25–13	25–19	-	-	75–53	Report
24 Feb	16:00	Karayolları	3–2	Çanakkale Belediye	25–14	25–23	18–25	12–25	15–8	95–95	Report
24 Feb	16:00	Beşiktaş	1–3	Türk Hava Yolları	26–24	17–25	18–25	22–25	-	83–99	Report

=== Week 21 ===
Date	Time		Score		Set 1	Set 2	Set 3	Set 4	Set 5	Total	Report
2 Mar	16:30	Halkbank	2–3	Nilüfer Belediye	18–25	25–19	19–25	25–19	8–15	95–103	Report
3 Mar	17:00	Çanakkale Belediye	1–3	Beşiktaş	25–18	16–25	20–25	15–25	-	76–93	Report
3 Mar	16:00	İhtisas	3–1	Aydın Büyükşehir Belediyespor	21–25	25–23	25–12	25–15	-	96–75	Report
3 Mar	14:00	Eczacıbaşı VitrA	3–1	Galatasaray	25–20	25–20	22–25	25–11	-	97–76	Report
3 Mar	16:30	Türk Hava Yolları	0–3	VakıfBank	14–25	16–25	21–25	-	-	51–75	Report
3 Mar	18:30	Fenerbahçe	3–0	Karayolları	25–18	25–16	25–20	-	-	75–54	Report

=== Week 22 ===
Date	Time		Score		Set 1	Set 2	Set 3	Set 4	Set 5	Total	Report
6 Mar	14:00	VakıfBank	3–0	Çanakkale Belediye	25–19	25–21	25–19	-	-	75–59	Report
9 Mar	13:00	Halkbank	0–3	Fenerbahçe	19–25	20–25	19–25	-	-	58–75	Report
9 Mar	14:00	Aydın Büyükşehir Belediyespor	0–3	Eczacıbaşı VitrA	16–25	16–25	13–25	-	-	45–75	Report
10 Mar	14:00	Nilüfer Belediye	3–1	İhtisas	19–25	25–18	25–17	25–17	-	94–77	Report
10 Mar	17:30	Beşiktaş	3–2	Karayolları	25–22	18–25	25–21	22–25	15–11	105–104	Report
10 Mar	19:30	Galatasaray	2–3	Türk Hava Yolları	20–25	25–15	23–25	25–10	11–15	104–90	Report

== Play-outs ==
Pos	Team	Pld	W	L	Pts	SW	SL	SR	SPW	SPL	SPR	Qualification	KRY	ABB	CAN	HAL
9	Karayolları	28	12	16	36	49	62	0.790	2305	2459	0.937		—	3–0	3–2	3–0
10	Aydın Büyükşehir Belediyespor	28	9	19	30.6	44	63	0.698	2185	2374	0.920		1–3	—	3–1	3–2
11	Çanakkale Belediye	28	6	22	21.335	32	72	0.444	2087	2395	0.871	Relegation	1–3	3–2	—	3–0
12	Halkbank	28	1	27	8.31	20	83	0.241	2067	2471	0.837	Relegation	3–2	1–3	1–3	—

Source: Sultanlar Ligi

== Play-offs ==
The eight teams that finished in the places 1 to 8 in the Regular season, compete in the Play-off (1-8).

Fifth place
5	Bursa BŞB	6
7	Beşiktaş	0
Seventh place
8	Nilüfer Bld	5
6	Halkbank	1

Consolation semifinals
8	Nilüfer Bld	2
5	Bursa BŞB	7
7	Beşiktaş	5
6	Halkbank	1

Quarterfinals
1	Eczacıbaşı VitrA	6
8	Nilüfer Bld	0
4	Fenerbahçe	5
5	Bursa BŞB	1
2	VakıfBank	6
7	Beşiktaş	0
3	Galatasaray Daikin	7
6	Halkbank	2

Semifinals
1	Eczacıbaşı VitrA	6
4	Fenerbahçe	0
2	VakıfBank	5
3	Galatasaray Daikin	1

Final
1	Eczacıbaşı VitrA	5
2	VakıfBank	10
Third place
4	Fenerbahçe	6
3	Galatasaray Daikin	0

=== Quarterfinals ===
Team 1	Agg.	Team 2	1st leg	2nd leg	3rd leg
Eczacıbaşı VitrA	6–0	Nilüfer Bld	3–0	3–0	—
VakıfBank	6–0	Beşiktaş	3–0	3–0	—
Galatasaray Daikin	7–2	Halkbank	2–3	3–0	3–1
Fenerbahçe	5–1	Bursa BŞB	3–1	3–2	—

=== Fifth place play-offs ===
- Winners qualify for CEV Challenge Cup main phase.
- 2 matches were needed for win.

Team 1	Agg.	Team 2	1st leg	2nd leg	3rd leg
Nilüfer Bld	2–7	Bursa BŞB	1–3	3–2	1–3
Halkbank	1–5	Halkbank	2–3	1–3	—

=== Semifinals ===
- Winners qualify for CEV Champions League league round.

Team 1	Agg.	Team 2	1st leg	2nd leg
Eczacıbaşı VitrA	6–0	Fenerbahçe	3–1	3–0
Nilüfer Bld	5–1	Galatasaray Daikin	3–0	3–2

=== Seventh place matches ===
Team 1	Agg.	Team 2	1st leg	2nd leg
Nilüfer Bld	5–1	Halkbank	3–0	3–2

=== Fifth place matches ===
Team 1	Agg.	Team 2	1st leg	2nd leg
Bursa BŞB	6–0	Beşiktaş	3–1	3–1

=== Third place matches ===
- Winner qualify for CEV Champions League qualification round.
- Loser qualify for CEV Cup main phase.

Team 1	Agg.	Team 2	1st leg	2nd leg
Fenerbahçe	6–0	Galatasaray Daikin	3–1	3–0

=== Final matches ===
- 5 matches were needed for win.

Team 1	Agg.	Team 2	1st leg	2nd leg	3rd leg	4th leg	5th leg
Eczacıbaşı VitrA	5–10	VakıfBank	0–3	3–1	3–2	0–3	0–3
VakıfBank won by 3–2 matches.

== Final standing ==
Rank	Team
1st place, gold medalist(s)	VakıfBank (Q)
2nd place, silver medalist(s)	Eczacıbaşı VitrA (Q)
3rd place, bronze medalist(s)	Fenerbahçe (Q)
4	Galatasaray Daikin (X)
5	Bursa BŞB (Y)
6	Beşiktaş
7	Nilüfer Bld
8	Halkbank
9	Beylikduzu
10	Aydın Büyükşehir Belediyespor
11	Çanakkale Bld (R)
12	İller Bankası (R)

(Q)	Qualified for the CEV Champions League league round
(X)	Qualified for the CEV Cup main phase
(Y)	Qualified for the CEV Challenge Cup main phase
(R)	Relegated to the Second League

2018–19 Turkish Women's Volleyball League
VakıfBank
10th title

Team Roster	Head coach
Gizem Örge; Gözde Kırdar (C); Cansu Özbay; Zhu Ting; Kübra Çalışkan; Kelsey Robinson; Melis Gürkaynak; Ayça Aykaç; Lonneke Slöetjes; Naz Aydemir Akyol; Melis Durul; Milena Rašić; Tuğba Şenoğlu; Zehra Güneş	Giovanni Guidetti

== Awards ==
=== Regular season ===
- Best scorer

(Ukraine) Olesia Rykhliuk (Beşiktaş)

- Best setter

(Turkey) Ezgi Dilik (Eczacıbaşı VitrA)

- Best outside spikers

(Netherlands) Anne Buijs (Nilüfer Belediyespor)
(Azerbaijan) (Slovakia) Jana Kulan (Kameroğlu Beylikdüzü Vol. İht.)

- Best middle blockers

(Turkey) Yasemin Güveli (Eczacıbaşı VitrA)
(Brazil) Ana Carolina da Silva (Nilüfer Belediyespor)

- Best opposite spiker

(Serbia) Tijana Bošković (Eczacıbaşı VitrA)

- Best libero

(Turkey) Pinar Eren (Beşiktaş)

=== Finals Series ===
- MVP

(China) Zhu Ting (VakıfBank)

- Best spiker

(Turkey) Gözde Kırdar (VakıfBank)

- Best blocker

(Turkey) Beyza Arıcı (Eczacıbaşı VitrA)

- Best setter

(Turkey) Cansu Özbay (VakıfBank)

- Best libero

(Turkey) Gizem Örge (VakıfBank)

- Special award

(Turkey) Zehra Gunes (VakıfBank)
