= Eczacıbaşı Sports Hall, Ayazağa =

Former sports venue in Levent of Istanbul, Turkey

Eczacıbaşı Sports Hall
- Eczacıbaşı Spor Salonu
- Interactive map of Eczacıbaşı Sports Hall
- Location: Ayazağa, Sarıyer, Istanbul, Turkey
- Coordinates: 41.111365°N 28.973462°E
- Owner: Eczacıbaşı S.K.
- Capacity: 1,000

Construction
- Opened: 24 July 2001; 25 years ago
- Closed: 2024
- Demolished: 2020s
- Architect: Aydın Boysan

Tenant
- Eczacıbaşı Volleyball

Eczacıbaşı Sports Hall (Turkish: Eczacıbaşı Spor Salonu) was an indoor arena for volleyball located at Ayazağa Quarter of Sarıyer District in Istanbul, Turkey. Built and owned by Eczacıbaşı, it was opened in 2001. It was abandoned in 2024 when a new sports hall was built in Kartal, Istanbul.

== Overview ==
Situated in Merkez Mah., Kemerburgaz Cad. 21 at Ayazağa Quarter of Sarıyer District in the European part of Istanbul, Turkey, Eczacıbaşı Sports Hall was opened on 24 July 2001. Designed by architect Aydın Boysan (1921–2018), it was built and owned by the conglomerate Eczacıbaşı, replacing the 1973-built Eczacıbaşı Sports Hall, Levent.

The sports hall was for volleyball matches, and had a seating capacity of 1,000.

After several years of service, it was abandoned when the Eczacıbaşı Sports Hall, Kartal in Istanbul's Asian part was built and opened on 1 October 2025.

== Usage ==
The arena was home to the 1966-established, pioneer of women's volleyball in Turkey and championship record holder, the Eczacıbaşı Volleyball in the Sultans League, until it was replaced by the new-built Eczacıbaşı Sports Hall, Kartal in Istanbul's Asian part.

== See also ==
- List of indoor arenas in Turkey
- Eczacıbaşı Sports Hall, Kartal
- Eczacıbaşı Sports Hall, Levent
