= Eczacıbaşı Sports Hall, Levent =

Former sports venue in Levent of Istanbul, Turkey

Eczacıbaşı Sports Hall
- Eczacıbaşı Spor Salonu
- Location: Levent, Beşiktaş, Istanbul, Turkey
- Owner: Eczacıbaşı S.K.

Construction
- Opened: 21 August 1973; 53 years ago
- Closed: 2001
- Demolished: 2000s
- Architect: Aydın Boysan

Tenant
- Eczacıbaşı Volleyball

Eczacıbaşı Sports Hall (Turkish: Eczacıbaşı Spor Salonu) was a multi-purpose indoor arena located at Levent Quarter of Beşiktaş District in Istanbul, Turkey. Built and owned by Eczacıbaşı, it was opened in 1973. It was abandoned in 2001, and then demolished.

== Overview ==
Situated on Büyükdere Avenue at Levent Quarter of Beşiktaş District in the European part of Istanbul, Turkey, Eczacıbaşı Sports Hall was opened on 21 August 1973 as the country's first private-sector-built sports hall. Designed by architect Aydın Boysan (1921–2018), it was built and was owned by the conglomerate Eczacıbaşı.

After several years of service, it was abandoned when the Eczacıbaşı Sports Hall, Ayazağa in Sarıyer District of Istanbul was built and opened on 24 July 2001. It was then demolished to make place for the Kanyon Shopping Mall of the same industrial froup, which was opened on 6 June 2006.

== Usage ==
The arena was home to the 1966-established, pioneer of women's volleyball in Turkey and championship record holder, the Eczacıbaşı Volleyball, until it was replaced by the new-built Eczacıbaşı Sports Hall, Ayazağa in Sarıyer District in Istanbul's European part, which was opened on 24 July 2001.

== See also ==
- List of indoor arenas in Turkey
- Eczacıbaşı Sports Hall, Ayazağa
- Eczacıbaşı Sports Hall, Kartal
