= Eczacıbaşı S.K. =

Turkish sports club (founded 1966)

- Full name: Eczacıbaşı Spor Kulübü
- Short name: ECZ
- Sport: Multiple (until 2007)
- Founded: 1966; 60 years ago
- Based in: Istanbul, Turkey
- Home ground: Eczacıbaşu Sports Hall, Kartal
- Colors
- Club titles: Intercontinental titles

Eczacıbaşı S.K. (Turkish: Eczacıbaşı Spor Kulübü) is a Turkish sports club founded in 1966 by the conglomerate Eczacıbaşı and based in Istanbul, Turkey. In addition to women's volleyball, the club maintained three sport divisions in the past, including table tennis, men's basketball and chess. Since 2007, it has been focusing on the 1967-founded women's volleyball branch only. In 2025, the club opened a new sports hall after closing two venues.

== History ==
The foundations of Eczacıbaşı Sports Club were laid in the 1950s with football and tennis tournaments and other sporting events organized within the Eczacıbaşı organization. These sporting activities gained a professional dimension in 1966 with the establishment of Eczacıbaşı Sports Club by Nejat Eczacıbaşı (1913–1993) and Şakir Eczacıbaşı (1929–2010).

The club became a member of the Federation in 1967 and since then has produced some of the most valuable athletes in Turkish sports history, particularly in basketball, volleyball, and table tennis.

=== Women's volleyball (1967–present ) ===
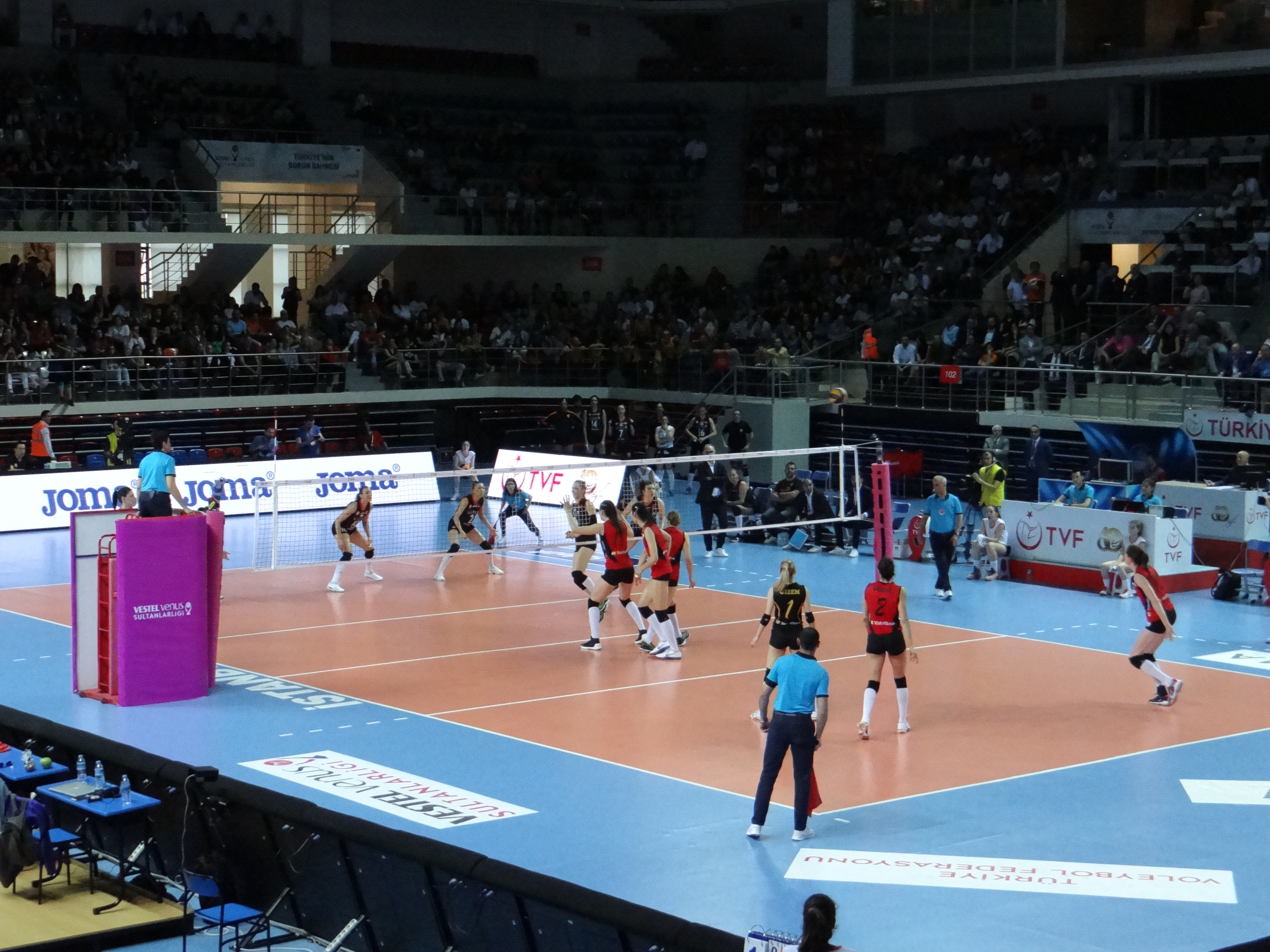
2017–18 Sultans League play-off final match between Eczacıbaşı VitrA and VakıfBank in the Burhan Felek Sport Hall.

The club's volleyball team Eczacıbaşı Dynavit, formerly Eczacıbaşı VitrA, is the most successful Turkish women's volleyball team at domestic competitions and also internationally.

=== Table tennis (1967–1989) ===
The table tennis team of the club competed in the Turkish League from 1967 to 1989, and became 13 times Turkish champion, won the Federation Cup eleven times, and the Ministry of Youth and Sports Cup eight times.

=== Men's basketball (1968–1992) ===
The men's basketball team, founded in 1968, became twice Turkish Second League champion, and eight times Turkish (First) League champion, and won once the Presidential Cup. The basketball side was closed in 1992.

=== Chess (2002–2007) ===
In 2002, the club's chess team, including also Eczacıbaşı Company employees, was admitted to the Turkish Second Chess League. After finishing the league at third place, they were promoted to the First League, and became three times Turkish champion between 2003 and 2005. The team represented Turkey twice at the European Chess Club Cup. In 2006, the team finished the season as runners-up. The club closed the chess side in 2007 deciding to focus on women's volleyball only.

== Arena ==
The company Eczacıbaşı built for its sports club the sports hall in Levent, Beşiktaş, the country's first private-sector sports venue. It was opened in 1973 and was abandoned in 2001 when a Eczacıbaşı Sports Hall, Ayazağasports hall in Ayazaüa, Sarıyer with 1,000 seating capacity was built. In 2025, the Eczacıbaşı Sports Hall, Kartal with 4,000 seating capacity was opened replacing the Ayazağa arena.
