= 2019–20 CEV Women's Champions League qualification =

This article shows the qualification phase for 2019–20 CEV Women's Champions League. 7 teams will play in qualification round. The two remaining teams will join the other 18 teams automatically qualified to the League round based on the European Cups' Ranking List. All 5 eliminated teams will then compete in 2019–20 Women's CEV Cup.

== Participating teams ==
Drawing of lots took place on 26 June 2019 in Luxembourg.

Rank	Country	Team(s)	Outcome (Qualified to)
11	Czech Republic	VK UP Olomouc	CEV Cup
16	Hungary	Vasas Óbuda Budapest	Champions League
17	Bosnia and Herzegovina	ŽOK Bimal-Jedinstvo Brčko	CEV Cup
20	Ukraine	Khimik Yuzhny	Champions League
22	Montenegro	ŽOK Luka Bar	CEV Cup
25	Albania	KV Partizani Tirana	CEV Cup
29	Croatia	Mladost Zagreb	CEV Cup

== First round ==
- No First round matches

== Second round ==
- 6 teams compete in this round. Winners advance to the Third round and losers compete in CEV Cup
- VK UP Olomouc got a virtual bye to Third round.

Team 1	Agg.	Team 2	1st leg	2nd leg	Golden Set
Mladost Zagreb (Croatia)	3–3	(Ukraine) Khimik Yuzhny	3–0	0–3	8–15
KV Partizani Tirana (Albania)	5–1	(Bosnia and Herzegovina) ŽOK Bimal-Jedinstvo Brčko	3–1	3–2	
ŽOK Luka Bar (Montenegro)	0–6	(Hungary) Vasas Óbuda Budapest	0–3	0–3	

=== First leg ===
Date	Time		Score		Set 1	Set 2	Set 3	Set 4	Set 5	Total	Report
9 Oct	20:00	Mladost Zagreb (Croatia)	3–0	(Ukraine) Khimik Yuzhny	25–17	25–17	27–25			77–59	Report
9 Oct	18:00	KV Partizani Tirana (Albania)	3–1	(Bosnia and Herzegovina) ŽOK Bimal-Jedinstvo Brčko	15–25	25–22	25–20	25–20		90–87	Report
8 Oct	18:00	ŽOK Luka Bar (Montenegro)	0–3	(Hungary) Vasas Óbuda Budapest	12–25	17–25	7–25			36–75	Report

=== Second leg ===
Date	Time		Score		Set 1	Set 2	Set 3	Set 4	Set 5	Total	Report
15 Oct	18:00	Khimik Yuzhny (Ukraine)	3–0	(Croatia) Mladost Zagreb	25–23	25–23	25–21			75–67	Report
Golden set		Khimik Yuzhny (Ukraine)	15–8	(Croatia) Mladost Zagreb							
16 Oct	19:00	ŽOK Bimal-Jedinstvo Brčko (Bosnia and Herzegovina)	2–3	(Albania) KV Partizani Tirana	21–25	25–19	18–25	25–21	13–15	102–105	Report
15 Oct	19:00	Vasas Óbuda Budapest (Hungary)	3–0	(Montenegro) ŽOK Luka Bar	25–10	25–19	25–16			75–45	Report

== Third round ==
- 4 teams compete in this round.
- Winners enter the League round and loser will compete in CEV Cup.

Team 1	Agg.	Team 2	1st leg	2nd leg	Golden Set
VK UP Olomouc (Czech Republic)	3–3	(Ukraine) Khimik Yuzhny	2–3	3–2	13–15
Vasas Óbuda Budapest (Hungary)	6–0	(Albania) KV Partizani Tirana	3–0	3–0	

=== First leg ===
Date	Time		Score		Set 1	Set 2	Set 3	Set 4	Set 5	Total	Report
22 Oct	18:10	VK UP Olomouc (Czech Republic)	2–3	(Ukraine) Khimik Yuzhny	25–22	12–25	25–23	20–25	13–15	95–110	Report
23 Oct	18:00	Vasas Óbuda Budapest (Hungary)	3–0	(Albania) KV Partizani Tirana	25–19	25–20	25–16			75–55	Report

=== Second leg ===
Date	Time		Score		Set 1	Set 2	Set 3	Set 4	Set 5	Total	Report
29 Oct	18:00	Khimik Yuzhny (Ukraine)	2–3	(Czech Republic) VK UP Olomouc	25–18	25–23	19–25	24–26	13–15	106–107	Report
Golden set		Khimik Yuzhny (Ukraine)	15–13	(Czech Republic) VK UP Olomouc							
31 Oct	18:00	KV Partizani Tirana (Albania)	0–3	(Hungary) Vasas Óbuda Budapest	19–25	17–25	16–25			52–75	Report
