= Çanakkale Belediyespor =

Turkish women's basketball team

- Leagues: Turkish Super League
- Founded: 1987; 39 years ago
- Arena: Çanakkale Sporcu Gelişim Merkezi
- Capacity: 2,500
- Location: Çanakkale, Turkey
- Team colors: Blue-White
- President: Akın Yalman
- Head coach: Tuğçe Canbaz

Çanakkale Belediyespor, also known as Dardanel Çanakkale Belediyespor for sponsorship reasons, is a Turkish women's basketball club based in Çanakkale, Turkey. The club was founded in 1987 and currently competing in the Women's Basketball Super League.

The team promoted to the Women's Basketball Super League at the end of the 2024–25 season.

== Current roster ==
Çanakkale Belediyespor roster
Players
Coaches

Pos.	No.	Nat.	Name	Ht.	Age
	3	(Turkey)	Yiğit, Reyyan		18 – 25 May 2007
SG	4	(Turkey)	Mandıracı, Saliha	1.70 m (5 ft 7 in)	23 – 10 March 2002
F	7	(Turkey)	Emirtekin, Elif	1.84 m (6 ft 0 in)	31 – 12 August 1994
F	9	(Turkey)	Çelebi, Hande	1.82 m (6 ft 0 in)	35 – 10 September 1990
PG	10	(Turkey)	Tongar, Dilara	1.69 m (5 ft 7 in)	34 – 22 February 1991
PF	11	(Turkey)	Tokmak, Simge	1.84 m (6 ft 0 in)	23 – 23 January 2003
C	12	(Turkey)	Altunbey, Başak	1.89 m (6 ft 2 in)	30 – 30 January 1996
C	14	(Turkey)	Yalçın, Nisa	1.92 m (6 ft 4 in)	25 – 19 January 2001
SF	20	(Turkey)	Kaya, Sıla		24 – 28 June 2001

Head coach

- (Turkey) Tuğçe Canbaz

Assistant coach(es)

- (Turkey) Hasan Turan

Legend

- (C) Team captain
- Injured

- Roster
Updated: February 17, 2026

== Notable players ==
- (United States) Aerial Powers (1 season: '25-'26)
- (United States) Shey Peddy (1 season: '25-'26)
