= TVF 50th Anniversary Sport Hall =

Volleyball hall in Üsküdar, Istanbul, Turkey

Coordinates: 41.01498°N 29.02976°E

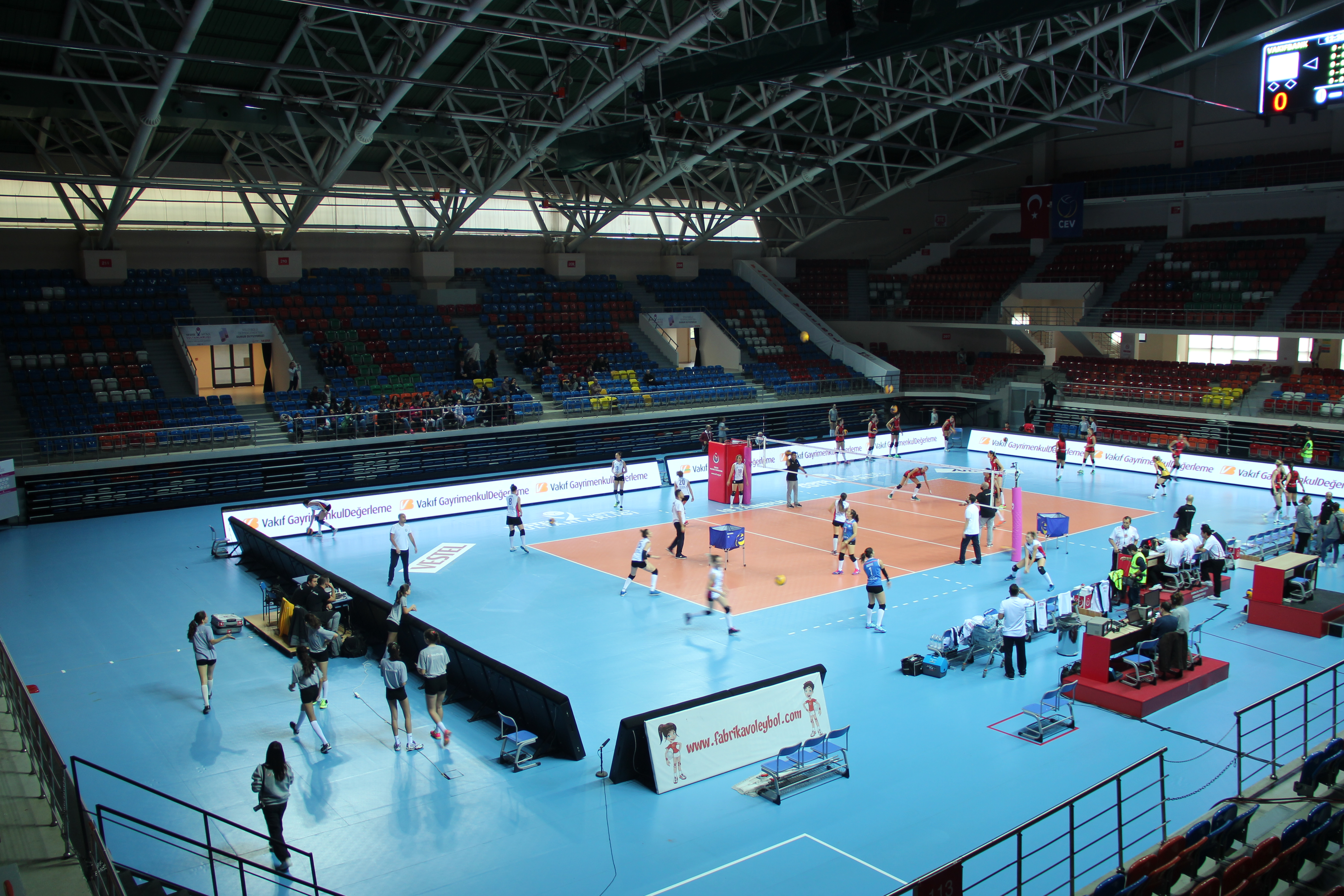
- Interactive map of TVF 50th Anniversary Sport Hall
- Location: Altunizade, Üsküdar, Istanbul
- Owner: Turkish Volleyball Federation (TVF)
- Capacity: 1,288

Construction
- Opened: October 11, 2008

Tenant
- İstanbul Büyükşehir Belediyesi

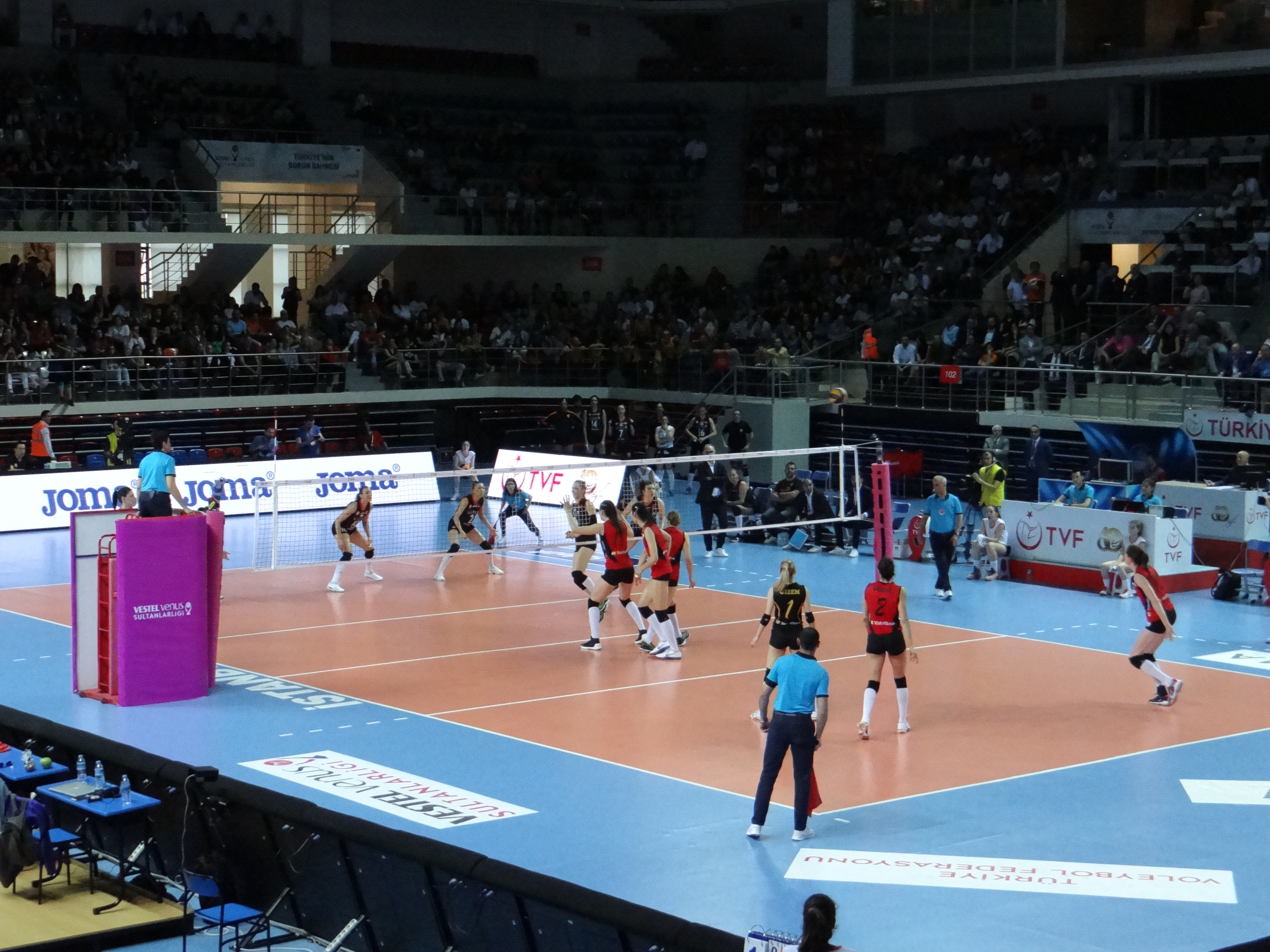
2017–18 Sultans League play-off final match between Eczacıbaşı VitrA and VakıfBank in the TVF 50th Anniversary Sport Hall.

TVF 50th Anniversary Deniz Esinduy Volleyball Hall (since 2024 Turkish: TVF 50. Yıl Deniz Esinduy Voleybol Salonu) is a volleyball and indoor beach volley hall situated within the Burhan Felek Sports Complex in the Altunizade neighborhood of Üsküdar district in Istanbul, Turkey. It was re-opened on October 11, 2008. It is owned by the municipality of Kadıköy District and operated by the Directorate of Youth and Sport of Istanbul Province.

The sports hall was built by the Turkish Volleyball Federation (TVF) as an annex to the Burhan Felek Arena replacing two tennis courts. The former volleyball hall was abondened.

The arena with an audience capacity of 7,500 hosts national and international volleyball and indoor beach volley events.

The men's volleyball team of İstanbul Büyükşehir Belediyesi plays its league matches in TVF 50th Anniversary Sport Hall.

In 2024, the sports hall was renamed to TVF 50. Yıl Deniz Esinduy Voleybol Salonu to honour turkish legend player and coach Deniz Esinduy.

== International events hosted ==
- 2012–13 CEV Women's Champions League-Final Four

== See also ==
- List of indoor arenas in Turkey
