= Eczacıbaşı Sports Hall, Kartal =

Sports venue in Kartal of Istanbul, Turkey

Eczacıbaşı Sports Hall
- Eczacıbaşı Spor Salonu
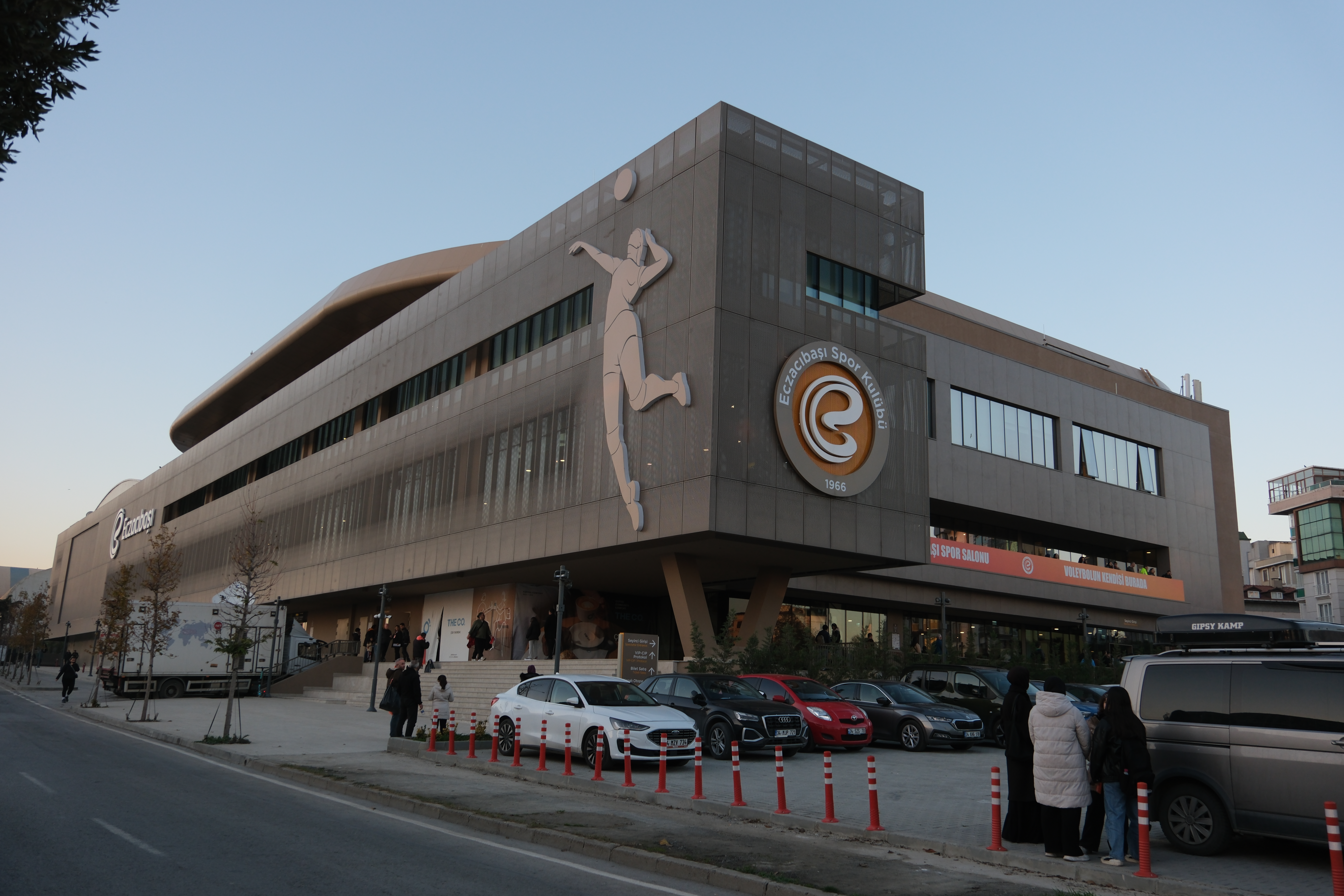
- Eczacıbaşı Sports Hall in Kartal, Istanbul.
- Interactive map of Eczacıbaşı Sports Hall
- Location: Kartal, Istanbul, Turkey
- Coordinates: 40.888329°N 29.213240°E
- Owner: Eczacıbaşı
- Capacity: 4,000

Construction
- Groundbreaking: 13 February 2024
- Opened: 1 October 2025; 10 months ago
- Architect: Yazgan Design Architecture

Tenant
- Eczacıbaşı Volleyball

Eczacıbaşı Sports Hall (Turkish: Eczacıbaşı Spor Salonu) is a multi-purpose indoor arena located at Kartal District in Istanbul, Turkey. Built and owned by Eczacıbaşı, it was opened in 2025.

== Overview ==
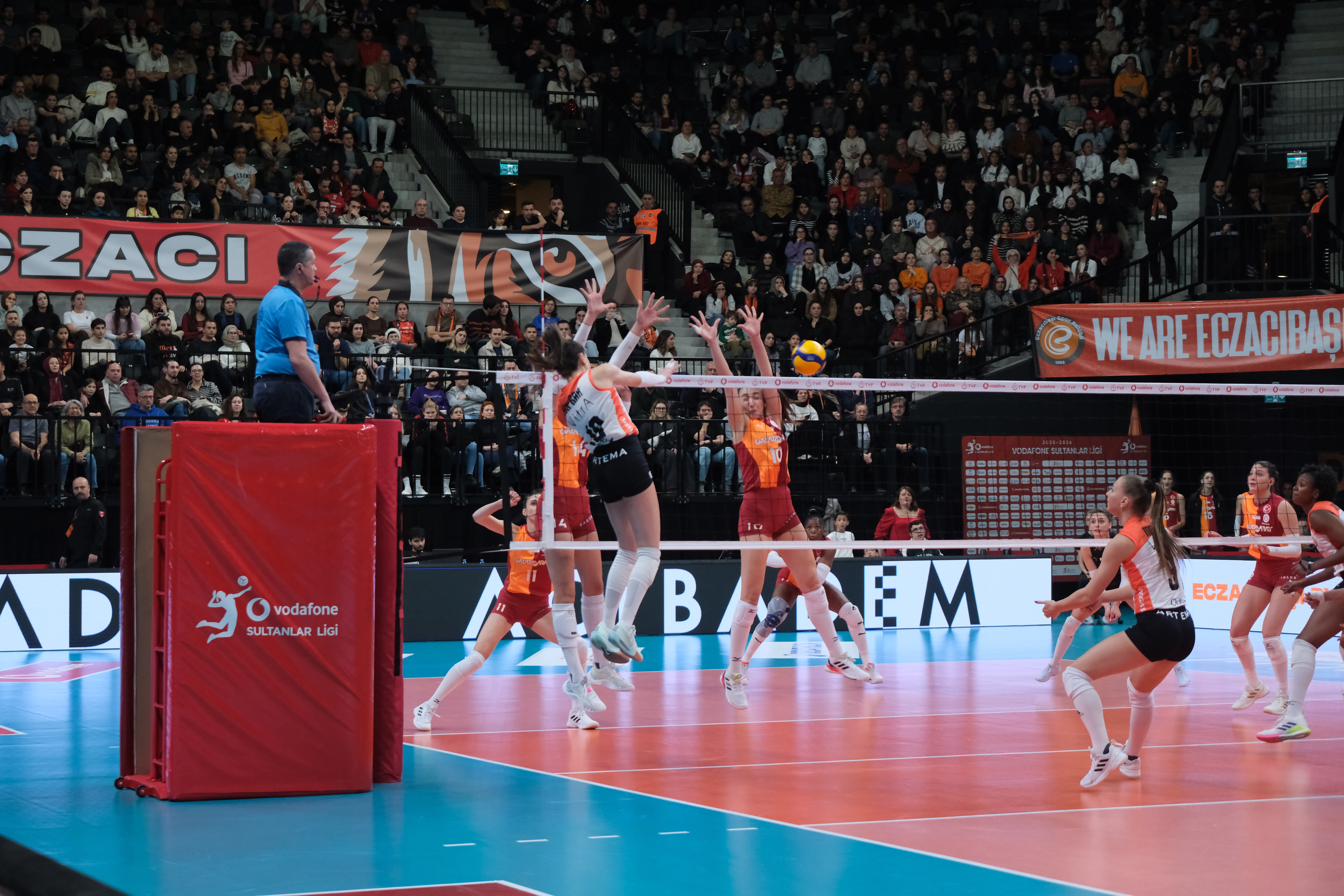
2025–26 Sultanlar League season match of Eczacıbaşı vs Galatasaray at the Kartal Hall.

Situated at Yunus Neighborhood, Ulunay Cad. 11 in Kartal District on the Asian part of Istanbul, Turkey, the facility was designed by Yazgan Design Architecture specifically for volleyball. The ground breaking took place on 13 February 2024. After a construction period of 15 months, the sports hall was opened on 1 October 2025. Built and owned by the conglomerate Eczacıbaşı, it replaced the club's 1973-built Eczacıbaşı Sports Hall at Levent, Beşiktaş and later the 2001-built Eczacıbaşı Sports Hall at Ayazağa, Sarıyer, both in Istanbul's European part.

The building covers an area of nearly 25,000 m^{2} (270,000 sq ft) having 8,700 m^{2} (94,000 sq ft) sports space in total. The main volleyball hall has 4,000 seating capacity on four court sides, including 250 seats for VIP and four special boxes of 80 seat capacity. For disabled spectators, special platforms are arranges. Apart from the main volleyball hall, the facility features three halls with full-size courts for training purposes. The main court features a museum showcasing the club's heritage and milestones for the exitement of the club fans. In the building, there are a fitness center, officces, café areas and a store for club brand items. An accommodation unit with 22 beds in 12 rooms is reserved for youth.

== Usage ==
The sports hall is home to Eczacıbaşı Volleyball's matches in the Sultans League and international FIVB and CEV competitions. The women's volleyball team play all league and European matches in the Kartal arena starting with the 2025–26 season. The facility serves also a central campus to train future volleyball players and to add new talents to the club's infrastructur e.

While the main focus is at volleyball, the hall offers a convertible venue for concerts, corporate events, fight nights and e-sports tournaments.

== See also ==
- List of indoor arenas in Turkey
- Eczacıbaşı Sports Hall, Levent
- Eczacıbaşı Sports Hall, Ayazağa
