= 2019–20 Women's CEV Cup =

- League: Women's CEV Cup
- Sport: Volleyball
- Duration: 3 December 2019 – 14 April 2020
- Teams: 32

Women's CEV Cup seasons
- ← 2018–19 2020–21 →

The 2019–20 Women's CEV Cup was the 48th edition of the European CEV Cup volleyball club tournament, the former "Top Teams Cup".

== Format ==
The tournament is played on a knockout format, with 32 teams participating. Initially 27 teams were allocated direct vacancies to enter the competition, with another 5 teams joining the competition via Champions League qualification. On 26 June 2019, a drawing of lots in Luxembourg City, Luxembourg, determined the team's pairing for each match. Each team plays a home and an away match with result points awarded for each leg (3 points for 3–0 or 3–1 wins, 2 points for 3–2 win, 1 point for 2–3 loss). After two legs, the team with the most result points advances to the next round. In case the teams are tied after two legs, a Golden Set is played immediately at the completion of the second leg. The Golden Set winner is the team that first obtains 15 points, provided that the points difference between the two teams is at least 2 points (thus, the Golden Set is similar to a tiebreak set in a normal match).

== Participating teams ==
- Drawing of lots for the 32 participating teams was held in Luxembourg City, Luxembourg on 26 June 2019.
- 27 teams allocated vacancies spots and 5 teams qualified as Champions League qualification losers.

The number of participants on the basis of ranking list for European Cup Competitions:

Rank	Country	Number of teams	Teams
1	Turkey	1	Galatasaray HDI Istanbul
2	Russia	1	Dinamo Kazan
3	Germany	2	SC Potsdam, SSC Palmberg Schwerin
4	Switzerland	2	Vitéos Neuchâtel UC, TS Volley Düdingen
5	Romania	2	CSM București, CSM Târgoviște
6	Belgium	2	Asterix Avo Beveren, Hermes Volley Oostende
7	France	2	ASPTT Mulhouse, Voléro Le Cannet
8	Hungary	1	Fatum Nyíregyháza
9	Czech Republic	3	VK UP Olomouc, VK Prostějov, VK Šelmy Brno
11	Italy	2	Unet e-work Busto Arsizio, Saugella Monza
12	Finland	1	Hämeenlinna
14	Belarus	1	Minchanka Minsk
15	Ukraine	1	Orbita ZNU Zodush Zaporizhzhya
16	Slovenia	1	GEN-I Volley Nova Gorica
17	Poland	2	Developres SkyRes Rzeszów, Grupa Azoty Chemik Police
20	Bosnia and Herzegovina	2	UOK Banjaluka Voley Banja Luka, ZOK Bimal-Jedinstvo Brčko
20	Netherlands	1	Sliedrecht Sport
22	Croatia	2	OK Kaštela, Mladost Zagreb
25	Spain	1	Sanaya Libby’s La Laguna
32	Montenegro	1	Luka Bar
36	Albania	1	Partizani Tirana

== Main phase ==
=== 16th Finals ===
Team 1	Agg.	Team 2	1st leg	2nd leg	Golden Set
Grupa Azoty Chemik Police (Poland)	5–1	(Turkey) Galatasaray HDI Istanbul	3–1	3–2	
Sanaya Libby’s La Laguna (Spain)	6–0	(Albania) Partizani Tirana	3–0	3–0	
OK Kaštela (Croatia)	0–6	(Croatia) Mladost Zagreb	0–3	0–3	
CSM Târgoviște (Romania)	2–4	(Hungary) Fatum Nyíregyháza	2–3	2–3	
Voléro Le Cannet (France)	–	(Romania) CSM București			
TS Volley Düdingen (Switzerland)	6–0	(Montenegro) Luka Bar	3–0	3–0	
UOK Banjaluka Voley Banja Luka (Bosnia and Herzegovina)	2–4	(Bosnia and Herzegovina) ZOK Bimal-Jedinstvo Brčko	3–2	0–3	
Minchanka Minsk (Belarus)	3–3	(Switzerland) Vitéos Neuchâtel UC	3–0	1–3	15–13
Sliedrecht Sport (Netherlands)	0–6	(Germany) SSC Palmberg Schwerin	0–3	0–3	
VK Šelmy Brno (Czech Republic)	2–4	(Finland) Hämeenlinna	3–2	0–3	
Asterix Avo Beveren (Belgium)	4–2	(Czech Republic) VK Prostějov	3–2	3–2	
GEN-I Volley Nova Gorica (Slovenia)	0–6	(Belgium) Hermes Volley Oostende	0–3	0–3	
Developres SkyRes Rzeszów (Poland)	3–3	(France) ASPTT Mulhouse	3–2	2–3	15–13
Unet e-work Busto Arsizio (Italy)	6–0	(Czech Republic) VK UP Olomouc	3–0	3–0	
Orbita ZNU Zodush Zaporizhzhya (Ukraine)	0–6	(Italy) Saugella Monza	0–3	0–3	
SC Potsdam (Germany)	1–5	(Russia) Dinamo Kazan	2–3	1–3	

- The match between Voléro Le Cannet and CSM București has been cancelled as a result of CSM București being banned from playing European cups for 3 years.

==== First leg ====
Date	Time		Score		Set 1	Set 2	Set 3	Set 4	Set 5	Total	Report
4 Dec	18:00	Grupa Azoty Chemik Police (Poland)	3–1	(Turkey) Galatasaray HDI Istanbul	25–20	17–25	25–19	27–25		94–89	Report
4 Dec	20:00	Sanaya Libby’s La Laguna (Spain)	3–0	(Albania) Partizani Tirana	25–14	25–17	25–15			75–46	Report
4 Dec	18:30	OK Kaštela (Croatia)	0–3	(Croatia) Mladost Zagreb	17–25	17–25	23–25			57–75	Report
3 Dec	18:00	CSM Târgoviște (Romania)	2–3	(Hungary) Fatum Nyíregyháza	22–25	17–25	29–27	26–24	10–15	104–116	Report
11 Dec	20:00	TS Volley Düdingen (Switzerland)	3–0	(Montenegro) Luka Bar	25–19	25–11	25–14			75–44	Report
5 Dec	19:00	UOK Banjaluka Voley Banja Luka (Bosnia and Herzegovina)	3–2	(Bosnia and Herzegovina) ZOK Bimal-Jedinstvo Brčko	30–28	15–25	24–26	25–15	15–11	109–105	Report
4 Dec	19:00	Minchanka Minsk (Belarus)	3–0	(Switzerland) Vitéos Neuchâtel UC	25–11	26–24	25–22			76–57	Report
4 Dec	19:30	Sliedrecht Sport (Netherlands)	0–3	(Germany) SSC Palmberg Schwerin	17–25	17–25	19–25			53–75	Report
4 Dec	18:00	VK Šelmy Brno (Czech Republic)	3–2	(Finland) Hämeenlinna	26–24	19–25	21–25	25–13	15–13	106–100	Report
4 Dec	20:30	Asterix Avo Beveren (Belgium)	3–2	(Czech Republic) VK Prostějov	22–25	25–21	25–15	25–27	15–8	112–96	Report
4 Dec	19:00	GEN-I Volley Nova Gorica (Slovenia)	0–3	(Belgium) Hermes Volley Oostende	12–25	18–25	19–25			49–75	Report
4 Dec	18:00	Developres SkyRes Rzeszów (Poland)	3–2	(France) ASPTT Mulhouse	26–24	23–25	25–22	20–25	15–7	109–103	Report
4 Dec	20:30	Unet e-work Busto Arsizio (Italy)	3–0	(Czech Republic) VK UP Olomouc	25–18	25–11	25–20			75–49	Report
17 Dec	20:30	Orbita ZNU Zodush Zaporizhzhya (Ukraine)	0–3	(Italy) Saugella Monza	15–25	12–25	7–25			34–75	Report
4 Dec	19:00	SC Potsdam (Germany)	2–3	(Russia) Dinamo Kazan	17–25	25–18	25–20	20–25	12–15	99–103	Report

==== Second leg ====
Date	Time		Score		Set 1	Set 2	Set 3	Set 4	Set 5	Total	Report
17 Dec	19:00	Galatasaray HDI Istanbul (Turkey)	2–3	(Poland) Grupa Azoty Chemik Police	25–19	18–25	25–19	23–25	12–15	103–103	Report
18 Dec	18:00	Partizani Tirana (Albania)	0–3	(Spain) Sanaya Libby’s La Laguna	12–25	14–25	20–25			46–75	Report
19 Dec	20:00	Mladost Zagreb (Croatia)	3–0	(Croatia) OK Kaštela	25–18	25–10	25–21			75–49	Report
17 Dec	18:00	Fatum Nyíregyháza (Hungary)	3–2	(Romania) CSM Târgoviște	14–25	25–18	25–14	18–25	16–14	98–96	Report
18 Dec	18:00	Luka Bar (Montenegro)	0–3	(Switzerland) TS Volley Düdingen	15–25	18–25	19–25			52–75	Report
18 Dec	19:00	ZOK Bimal-Jedinstvo Brčko (Bosnia and Herzegovina)	3–0	(Bosnia and Herzegovina) UOK Banjaluka Voley Banja Luka	25–15	25–13	25–21			75–49	Report
18 Dec	20:00	Vitéos Neuchâtel UC (Switzerland)	3–1	(Belarus) Minchanka Minsk	28–26	23–25	25–19	27–25		103–95	Report
Golden set		Vitéos Neuchâtel UC (Switzerland)	13–15	(Belarus) Minchanka Minsk							
17 Dec	19:00	SSC Palmberg Schwerin (Germany)	3–0	(Netherlands) Sliedrecht Sport	25–16	25–18	25–19			75–53	Report
17 Dec	18:30	Hämeenlinna (Finland)	3–0	(Czech Republic) VK Šelmy Brno	25–23	25–15	26–24			76–62	Report
19 Dec	18:00	VK Prostějov (Czech Republic)	2–3	(Belgium) Asterix Avo Beveren	25–17	25–16	19–25	19–25	11–15	99–98	Report
18 Dec	20:30	Hermes Volley Oostende (Belgium)	3–0	(Slovenia) GEN-I Volley Nova Gorica	25–16	25–19	25–22			75–57	Report
18 Dec	19:00	ASPTT Mulhouse (France)	3–2	(Poland) Developres SkyRes Rzeszów	24–26	22–25	25–23	25–13	15–12	111–99	Report
Golden set		ASPTT Mulhouse (France)	13–15	(Poland) Developres SkyRes Rzeszów							
19 Dec	18:00	VK UP Olomouc (Czech Republic)	0–3	(Italy) Unet e-work Busto Arsizio	21–25	18–25	19–25			58–75	Report
19 Dec	20:30	Saugella Monza (Italy)	3–0	(Ukraine) Orbita ZNU Zodush Zaporizhzhya	25–23	25–19	25–17			75–59	Report
18 Dec	19:00	Dinamo Kazan (Russia)	3–1	(Germany) SC Potsdam	25–20	15–25	25–12	25–23		90–80	Report

=== 8th Finals ===
Team 1	Agg.	Team 2	1st leg	2nd leg	Golden Set
Grupa Azoty Chemik Police (Poland)	6–0	(Spain) Sanaya Libby’s La Laguna	3–0	3–1	
Fatum Nyíregyháza (Hungary)	3–3	(Croatia) Mladost Zagreb	3–2	2–3	17–19
Voléro Le Cannet (France)	6–0	(Switzerland) TS Volley Düdingen	3–0	3–0	
Minchanka Minsk (Belarus)	6–0	(Bosnia and Herzegovina) ZOK Bimal-Jedinstvo Brčko	3–0	3–1	
Hämeenlinna (Finland)	0–6	(Germany) SSC Palmberg Schwerin	1–3	1–3	
Hermes Volley Oostende (Belgium)	2–4	(Belgium) Asterix Avo Beveren	2–3	2–3	
Unet e-work Busto Arsizio (Italy)	3–3	(Poland) Developres SkyRes Rzeszów	3–0	0–3	15–11
Dinamo Kazan (Russia)	6–0	(Italy) Saugella Monza	3–0	3–1	

==== First leg ====
Date	Time		Score		Set 1	Set 2	Set 3	Set 4	Set 5	Total	Report
22 Jan	18:00	Grupa Azoty Chemik Police (Poland)	3–0	(Spain) Sanaya Libby’s La Laguna	25–13	25–16	25–16			75–45	Report
22 Jan	18:00	Fatum Nyíregyháza (Hungary)	3–2	(Croatia) Mladost Zagreb	19–25	25–18	18–25	25–21	15–12	102–101	Report
22 Jan	20:00	Voléro Le Cannet (France)	3–0	(Switzerland) TS Volley Düdingen	25–18	25–19	25–16			75–53	Report
22 Jan	19:00	Minchanka Minsk (Belarus)	3–0	(Bosnia and Herzegovina) ZOK Bimal-Jedinstvo Brčko	25–8	25–20	25–16			75–44	Report
22 Jan	18:30	Hämeenlinna (Finland)	1–3	(Germany) SSC Palmberg Schwerin	19–25	25–23	20–25	16–25		80–98	Report
22 Jan	20:30	Hermes Volley Oostende (Belgium)	2–3	(Belgium) Asterix Avo Beveren	19–25	25–21	25–21	23–25	14–16	106–108	Report
23 Jan	20:30	Unet e-work Busto Arsizio (Italy)	3–0	(Poland) Developres SkyRes Rzeszów	25–22	25–17	25–22			75–61	Report
23 Jan	19:00	Dinamo Kazan (Russia)	3–0	(Italy) Saugella Monza	25–23	25–13	25–19			75–55	Report

==== Second leg ====
Date	Time		Score		Set 1	Set 2	Set 3	Set 4	Set 5	Total	Report
5 Feb	18:30	Sanaya Libby’s La Laguna (Spain)	1–3	(Poland) Grupa Azoty Chemik Police	27–25	22–25	17–25	23–25		89–100	Report
5 Feb	20:00	Mladost Zagreb (Croatia)	3–2	(Hungary) Fatum Nyíregyháza	25–20	25–22	19–25	23–25	15–8	107–100	Report
Golden set		Mladost Zagreb (Croatia)	19–17	(Hungary) Fatum Nyíregyháza							
5 Feb	20:00	TS Volley Düdingen (Switzerland)	0–3	(France) Voléro Le Cannet	15–25	23–25	20–25			58–75	Report
4 Feb	19:00	ZOK Bimal-Jedinstvo Brčko (Bosnia and Herzegovina)	1–3	(Belarus) Minchanka Minsk	21–25	21–25	25–22	15–25		82–97	Report
6 Feb	19:00	SSC Palmberg Schwerin (Germany)	3–1	(Finland) Hämeenlinna	25–15	25–15	16–25	25–12		91–67	Report
5 Feb	19:30	Asterix Avo Beveren (Belgium)	3–2	(Belgium) Hermes Volley Oostende	21–25	20–25	25–21	25–22	15–9	106–102	Report
5 Feb	18:00	Developres SkyRes Rzeszów (Poland)	3–0	(Italy) Unet e-work Busto Arsizio	25–20	25–23	27–25			77–68	Report
Golden set		Developres SkyRes Rzeszów (Poland)	11–15	(Italy) Unet e-work Busto Arsizio							
5 Feb	20:30	Saugella Monza (Italy)	1–3	(Russia) Dinamo Kazan	16–25	25–18	20–25	20–25		81–93	Report

=== 4th Finals ===
Team 1	Agg.	Team 2	1st leg	2nd leg	Golden Set
Mladost Zagreb (Croatia)	0–6	(Poland) Grupa Azoty Chemik Police	0–3	0–3	
Minchanka Minsk (Belarus)	0–6	(France) Voléro Le Cannet	1–3	0–3	
Asterix Avo Beveren (Belgium)	0–6	(Germany) SSC Palmberg Schwerin	1–3	0–3	
Dinamo Kazan (Russia)	3–0	(Italy) Unet e-work Busto Arsizio	3–0	–	

==== First leg ====
Date	Time		Score		Set 1	Set 2	Set 3	Set 4	Set 5	Total	Report
20 Feb	20:00	Mladost Zagreb (Croatia)	0–3	(Poland) Grupa Azoty Chemik Police	19–25	13–25	16–25			48–75	Report
20 Feb	18:30	Minchanka Minsk (Belarus)	1–3	(France) Voléro Le Cannet	22–25	15–25	25–20	16–25		78–95	Report
20 Feb	19:30	Asterix Avo Beveren (Belgium)	1–3	(Germany) SSC Palmberg Schwerin	25–16	20–25	21–25	13–25		79–91	Report
20 Feb	19:00	Dinamo Kazan (Russia)	3–0	(Italy) Unet e-work Busto Arsizio	25–17	25–12	25–20			75–49	Report

==== Second leg ====
Date	Time		Score		Set 1	Set 2	Set 3	Set 4	Set 5	Total	Report
3 Mar	18:00	Grupa Azoty Chemik Police (Poland)	3–0	(Croatia) Mladost Zagreb	25–19	25–18	25–10			75–47	Report
4 Mar	20:00	Voléro Le Cannet (France)	3–0	(Belarus) Minchanka Minsk	25–13	25–18	33–31			83–62	Report
3 Mar	19:00	SSC Palmberg Schwerin (Germany)	3–0	(Belgium) Asterix Avo Beveren	25–13	25–16	25–14			75–43	Report
TBD	TBD	Unet e-work Busto Arsizio (Italy)	–	(Russia) Dinamo Kazan	–	–	–			0–0	Report

- The match between Unet e-work Busto Arsizio and Dinamo Kazan has been postponed due to the COVID-19 pandemic in Europe.

== Final phase ==
=== Semifinals ===
Team 1	Agg.	Team 2	1st leg	2nd leg	Golden Set
Grupa Azoty Chemik Police (Poland)	–	(France) Voléro Le Cannet	–	–	
	–	(Germany) SSC Palmberg Schwerin	–	–	

==== First leg ====
Date	Time		Score		Set 1	Set 2	Set 3	Set 4	Set 5	Total	Report
TBD	TBD	Grupa Azoty Chemik Police (Poland)	–	(France) Voléro Le Cannet	–	–	–			0–0	
TBD	TBD		–	(Germany) SSC Palmberg Schwerin	–	–	–			0–0	

==== Second leg ====
Date	Time		Score		Set 1	Set 2	Set 3	Set 4	Set 5	Total	Report
TBD	TBD	Voléro Le Cannet (France)	–	(Poland) Grupa Azoty Chemik Police	–	–	–			0–0	
TBD	TBD	SSC Palmberg Schwerin (Germany)	–		–	–	–			0–0	

=== Finals ===
Team 1	Agg.	Team 2	1st leg	2nd leg	Golden Set
	–		–	–	

==== First leg ====
Date	Time	Score	Set 1	Set 2	Set 3	Set 4	Set 5	Total	Report
		–	–	–	–			0–0	

==== Second leg ====
Date	Time	Score	Set 1	Set 2	Set 3	Set 4	Set 5	Total	Report
		–	–	–	–			0–0	
