= 2019–20 CEV Women's Champions League =

- League: CEV Women's Champions League
- Sport: Volleyball
- Duration: Qualifying round: 8–31 October 2019; Main tournament: 19 November 2019 – 17 May 2020
- Number of teams: 25 (7 qual. + 18 main tourn.)

CEV Women's Champions League seasons
- ← 2018–19 2020–21 →

The 2019–20 CEV Champions League is the highest level of European club volleyball in the 2019–20 season and the 60th edition. It was interrupted and canceled on April 23, 2020 because of the COVID-19 pandemic.

== Qualification ==
A total of 20 teams competed in the main competition, with 18 teams being allocated direct vacancies on the basis of ranking list for European Cup Competitions and 2 teams qualify from the qualification rounds.

Rank	Country	No. teams			Qualified teams
Rank	Country	Vac	Qual	Total	Qualified teams
1	Turkey	3	–	3	Vakifbank Istanbul
1	Turkey	3	–	3	Eczacıbaşı VitrA Istanbul
1	Turkey	3	–	3	Fenerbahçe Opet Istanbul
2	Italy	3	–	3	A. Carraro Imoco Conegliano
2	Italy	3	–	3	Igor Gorgonzola Novara
2	Italy	3	–	3	Savino Del Bene Scandicci
3	Russia	3	–	3	Dinamo Moscow
3	Russia	3	–	3	Lokomotiv Kaliningrad
3	Russia	3	–	3	Uralochka NTMK Ekaterinburg
4	Poland	2	–	2	ŁKS Commercecon Łódź
4	Poland	2	–	2	Budowlani Łódź
6	France	2	–	2	RC Cannes
6	France	2	–	2	Nantes VB
8	Romania	1	–	1	CSM Volei Alba Blaj
9	Germany	1	–	1	Allianz MTV Stuttgart
12	Slovenia	1	–	1	Nova KBM Branik Maribor
14	Bulgaria	1	–	1	Maritza Plovdiv
15	Finland	1	–	1	LP Salo
16	Hungary	0	1	1	Vasas Óbuda Budapest
20	Ukraine	0	1	1	Khimik Yuzhny

== Pool composition ==
Drawing of lots for the league round was held on 25 October 2019 in Sofia, Bulgaria.

== League round ==
- All times are local.

=== Pool A ===
Pos	Team	Pld	W	L	Pts	SW	SL	SR	SPW	SPL	SPR	Qualification
1	(Turkey) Eczacıbaşı VitrA Istanbul	6	6	0	15	18	6	3.000	544	449	1.212	Quarterfinals
2	(Turkey) Fenerbahçe Opet Istanbul	6	4	2	14	16	6	2.667	507	403	1.258	Quarterfinals
3	(Poland) Budowlani Łódź	6	2	4	7	8	13	0.615	438	478	0.916	
4	(Finland) LP Salo	6	0	6	0	1	18	0.056	317	476	0.666	

Date	Time		Score		Set 1	Set 2	Set 3	Set 4	Set 5	Total	Report
19 Nov	17:30	Eczacıbaşı VitrA Istanbul (Turkey)	3–2	(Turkey) Fenerbahçe Opet Istanbul	25–23	25–18	23–25	22–25	15–10	110–101	Report
20 Nov	18:00	Budowlani Łódź (Poland)	3–1	(Finland) LP Salo	25–16	25–12	18–25	25–22		93–75	Report
26 Nov	19:00	LP Salo (Finland)	0–3	(Turkey) Eczacıbaşı VitrA Istanbul	22–25	10–25	14–25			46–75	Report
28 Nov	19:00	Fenerbahçe Opet Istanbul (Turkey)	3–0	(Poland) Budowlani Łódź	25–20	25–12	25–13			75–45	Report
18 Dec	18:00	Budowlani Łódź (Poland)	0–3	(Turkey) Eczacıbaşı VitrA Istanbul	17–25	16–25	22–25			55–75	Report
18 Dec	20:00	LP Salo (Finland)	0–3	(Turkey) Fenerbahçe Opet Istanbul	10–25	16–25	14–25			40–75	Report
22 Jan	17:30	Eczacıbaşı VitrA Istanbul (Turkey)	3–0	(Finland) LP Salo	25–16	25–13	25–13			75–42	Report
22 Jan	18:00	Budowlani Łódź (Poland)	0–3	(Turkey) Fenerbahçe Opet Istanbul	20–25	21–25	22–25			63–75	Report
5 Feb	18:30	LP Salo (Finland)	0–3	(Poland) Budowlani Łódź	31–33	21–25	19–25			71–83	Report
6 Feb	19:00	Fenerbahçe Opet Istanbul (Turkey)	2–3	(Turkey) Eczacıbaşı VitrA Istanbul	22–25	25–16	24–26	25–20	10–15	106–102	Report
18 Feb	17:00	Eczacıbaşı VitrA Istanbul (Turkey)	3–2	(Poland) Budowlani Łódź	17–25	25–27	25–19	25–21	15–7	107–99	Report
18 Feb	20:00	Fenerbahçe Opet Istanbul (Turkey)	3–0	(Finland) LP Salo	25–17	25–12	25–14			75–43	Report

=== Pool B ===
Pos	Team	Pld	W	L	Pts	SW	SL	SR	SPW	SPL	SPR	Qualification
1	(Turkey) Vakifbank Istanbul	6	5	1	15	17	5	3.400	519	406	1.278	Quarterfinals
2	(Italy) Savino Del Bene Scandicci	6	5	1	13	15	9	1.667	540	502	1.076	Quarterfinals
3	(Russia) Lokomotiv Kaliningrad	6	2	4	8	11	12	0.917	507	497	1.020	
4	(Slovenia) Nova KBM Branik Maribor	6	0	6	0	1	18	0.056	312	473	0.660	

Date	Time		Score		Set 1	Set 2	Set 3	Set 4	Set 5	Total	Report
20 Nov	18:00	Vakifbank Istanbul (Turkey)	2–3	(Italy) Savino Del Bene Scandicci	21–25	25–19	25–13	15–25	11–15	97–97	Report
20 Nov	19:00	Lokomotiv Kaliningrad (Russia)	3–0	(Slovenia) Nova KBM Branik Maribor	25–18	25–14	25–11			75–43	Report
27 Nov	19:00	Nova KBM Branik Maribor (Slovenia)	0–3	(Turkey) Vakifbank Istanbul	22–25	10–25	14–25			46–75	Report
27 Nov	20:30	Savino Del Bene Scandicci (Italy)	3–1	(Russia) Lokomotiv Kaliningrad	26–24	23–25	26–24	25–21		100–94	Report
17 Dec	19:00	Lokomotiv Kaliningrad (Russia)	2–3	(Turkey) Vakifbank Istanbul	34–32	25–21	19–25	24–26	10–15	112–119	Report
18 Dec	20:30	Savino Del Bene Scandicci (Italy)	3–0	(Slovenia) Nova KBM Branik Maribor	25–16	25–22	25–16			75–54	Report
22 Jan	19:00	Lokomotiv Kaliningrad (Russia)	2–3	(Italy) Savino Del Bene Scandicci	17–25	25–23	21–25	25–16	12–15	100–104	Report
23 Jan	19:00	Vakifbank Istanbul (Turkey)	3–0	(Slovenia) Nova KBM Branik Maribor	25–15	25–11	25–10			75–36	Report
4 Feb	18:00	Nova KBM Branik Maribor (Slovenia)	0–3	(Russia) Lokomotiv Kaliningrad	17–25	21–25	18–25			56–75	Report
5 Feb	20:30	Savino Del Bene Scandicci (Italy)	0–3	(Turkey) Vakifbank Istanbul	26–28	19–25	21–25			66–78	Report
18 Feb	19:30	Vakifbank Istanbul (Turkey)	3–0	(Russia) Lokomotiv Kaliningrad	25–22	25–11	25–18			75–51	Report
18 Feb	18:00	Nova KBM Branik Maribor (Slovenia)	1–3	(Italy) Savino Del Bene Scandicci	25–23	20–25	20–25	14–25		79–98	Report

=== Pool C ===
Pos	Team	Pld	W	L	Pts	SW	SL	SR	SPW	SPL	SPR	Qualification
1	(Italy) Igor Gorgonzola Novara	6	5	1	14	16	5	3.200	493	361	1.366	Quarterfinals
2	(Germany) Allianz MTV Stuttgart	6	4	2	13	14	9	1.556	509	489	1.041	Quarterfinals
3	(Poland) ŁKS Commercecon Łódź	6	3	3	8	12	14	0.857	534	555	0.962	
4	(Ukraine) Khimik Yuzhny	6	0	6	1	4	18	0.222	397	528	0.752	

Date	Time		Score		Set 1	Set 2	Set 3	Set 4	Set 5	Total	Report
19 Nov	18:00	ŁKS Commercecon Łódź (Poland)	3–2	(Germany) Allianz MTV Stuttgart	16–25	25–22	25–19	16–25	15–10	97–101	Report
20 Nov	20:30	Igor Gorgonzola Novara (Italy)	3–0	(Ukraine) Khimik Yuzhny	25–17	25–10	25–7			75–34	Report
26 Nov	18:00	Khimik Yuzhny (Ukraine)	2–3	(Poland) ŁKS Commercecon Łódź	25–23	25–17	20–25	18–25	8–15	96–105	Report
27 Nov	19:00	Allianz MTV Stuttgart (Germany)	3–1	(Italy) Igor Gorgonzola Novara	11–25	25–20	25–18	25–23		86–86	Report
17 Dec	18:00	Khimik Yuzhny (Ukraine)	1–3	(Germany) Allianz MTV Stuttgart	22–25	16–25	25–22	26-28		89–72	Report
17 Dec	18:00	ŁKS Commercecon Łódź (Poland)	2–3	(Italy) Igor Gorgonzola Novara	25–22	15–25	9–25	25-19	10-15	84–72	Report
23 Jan	18:00	ŁKS Commercecon Łódź (Poland)	3–1	(Ukraine) Khimik Yuzhny	25–15	25–19	23–25	25–22		98–81	Report
23 Jan	20:30	Igor Gorgonzola Novara (Italy)	3–0	(Germany) Allianz MTV Stuttgart	25–11	25–22	25–19			75–52	Report
4 Feb	18:00	Khimik Yuzhny (Ukraine)	0–3	(Italy) Igor Gorgonzola Novara	14–25	14–25	12–25			40–75	Report
5 Feb	19:00	Allianz MTV Stuttgart (Germany)	3–1	(Poland) ŁKS Commercecon Łódź	17–25	28–26	25–16	25–18		95–85	Report
18 Feb	19:00	Allianz MTV Stuttgart (Germany)	3–0	(Ukraine) Khimik Yuzhny	25–21	25–19	25–17			75–57	Report
18 Feb	20:30	Igor Gorgonzola Novara (Italy)	3–0	(Poland) ŁKS Commercecon Łódź	25–21	25–20	26–24			76–65	Report

=== Pool D ===
Pos	Team	Pld	W	L	Pts	SW	SL	SR	SPW	SPL	SPR	Qualification
1	(Italy) A. Carraro Imoco Conegliano	6	6	0	17	18	2	9.000	484	356	1.360	Quarterfinals
2	(France) Nantes VB	6	3	3	9	10	11	0.909	469	470	0.998	
3	(Romania) CSM Volei Alba Blaj	6	3	3	9	10	11	0.909	446	472	0.945	
4	(Hungary) Vasas Óbuda Budapest	6	0	6	1	4	18	0.222	411	512	0.803	

Date	Time		Score		Set 1	Set 2	Set 3	Set 4	Set 5	Total	Report
19 Nov	19:30	Nantes VB (France)	3–1	(Romania) CSM Volei Alba Blaj	25–19	20–25	25–12	25–16		95–72	Report
19 Nov	20:30	A. Carraro Imoco Conegliano (Italy)	3–2	(Hungary) Vasas Óbuda Budapest	21–25	25–20	25–10	23–25	15–4	109–84	Report
26 Nov	19:00	Vasas Óbuda Budapest (Hungary)	0–3	(France) Nantes VB	23–25	22–25	11–25			56–75	Report
27 Nov	17:00	CSM Volei Alba Blaj (Romania)	0–3	(Italy) A. Carraro Imoco Conegliano	22–25	14–25	22–25			58–75	Report
17 Dec	19:30	Nantes VB (France)	0–3	(Italy) A. Carraro Imoco Conegliano	22–25	18–25	22–25			62–75	Report
19 Dec	19:00	Vasas Óbuda Budapest (Hungary)	1–3	(Romania) CSM Volei Alba Blaj	20–25	16–25	25–13	18–25		79–88	Report
21 Jan	19:30	Nantes VB (France)	3–1	(Hungary) Vasas Óbuda Budapest	25–23	15–25	25–22	25–18		90–88	Report
22 Jan	20:30	A. Carraro Imoco Conegliano (Italy)	3–0	(Romania) CSM Volei Alba Blaj	25–16	25–16	25–17			75–49	Report
5 Feb	17:00	CSM Volei Alba Blaj (Romania)	3–1	(France) Nantes VB	27–29	25–13	27–25	25–21		104–88	Report
6 Feb	19:00	Vasas Óbuda Budapest (Hungary)	0–3	(Italy) A. Carraro Imoco Conegliano	12–25	19–25	13–25			44–75	Report
18 Feb	17:00	CSM Volei Alba Blaj (Romania)	3–0	(Hungary) Vasas Óbuda Budapest	25–23	25–16	25–21			75–60	Report
18 Feb	19:00	A. Carraro Imoco Conegliano (Italy)	3–0	(France) Nantes VB	25–23	25–19	25–17			75–59	Report

=== Pool E ===
Pos	Team	Pld	W	L	Pts	SW	SL	SR	SPW	SPL	SPR	Qualification
1	(Russia) Dinamo Moscow	6	4	2	12	13	8	1.625	502	451	1.113	Quarterfinals
2	(France) RC Cannes	6	3	3	9	12	12	1.000	533	517	1.031	
3	(Bulgaria) Maritza Plovdiv	6	3	3	9	13	13	1.000	552	560	0.986	
4	(Russia) Uralochka NTMK Ekaterinburg	6	2	4	6	11	16	0.688	549	608	0.903	

Date	Time		Score		Set 1	Set 2	Set 3	Set 4	Set 5	Total	Report
19 Nov	20:30	RC Cannes (France)	3–1	(Bulgaria) Maritza Plovdiv	26–24	18–25	25–7	25–19		94–75	Report
21 Nov	19:00	Dinamo Moscow (Russia)	3–1	(Russia) Uralochka NTMK Ekaterinburg	25–18	22–25	25–17	25–20		97–80	Report
27 Nov	19:00	Uralochka NTMK Ekaterinburg (Russia)	2–3	(France) RC Cannes	28–26	14–25	25–23	16–25	12–15	95–114	Report
27 Nov	18:30	Maritza Plovdiv (Bulgaria)	1–3	(Russia) Dinamo Moscow	18–25	25–22	17–25	17–25		77–97	Report
17 Dec	20:00	RC Cannes (France)	3–0	(Russia) Dinamo Moscow	25–22	28–26	25–22			78–70	Report
19 Dec	19:00	Uralochka NTMK Ekaterinburg (Russia)	3–2	(Bulgaria) Maritza Plovdiv	25–17	18–25	18–25	25–22	15–13	101–102	Report
21 Jan	20:30	RC Cannes (France)	2–3	(Russia) Uralochka NTMK Ekaterinburg	26–24	22–25	21–25	25–21	13–15	107–110	Report
23 Jan	19:00	Dinamo Moscow (Russia)	1–3	(Bulgaria) Maritza Plovdiv	23–25	25–18	23–25	17–25		88–93	Report
5 Feb	18:30	Maritza Plovdiv (Bulgaria)	3–1	(France) RC Cannes	17–25	25–18	25–12	25–21		92–76	Report
6 Feb	19:00	Uralochka NTMK Ekaterinburg (Russia)	0–3	(Russia) Dinamo Moscow	20–25	16–25	23–25			59–75	Report
18 Feb	18:30	Maritza Plovdiv (Bulgaria)	3–2	(Russia) Uralochka NTMK Ekaterinburg	25–19	21–25	25–17	22–25	20–18	113–104	Report
18 Feb	19:00	Dinamo Moscow (Russia)	3–0	(France) RC Cannes	25–22	25–20	25–22			75–64	Report

=== Second place ranking ===
Pos	Team	Pld	W	L	Pts	SW	SL	SR	SPW	SPL	SPR	Qualification
1	(Italy) Savino Del Bene Scandicci	6	5	1	13	15	9	1.667	540	502	1.076	Quarterfinals
2	(Turkey) Fenerbahçe Opet Istanbul	6	4	2	14	16	6	2.667	507	403	1.258	Quarterfinals
3	(Germany) Allianz MTV Stuttgart	6	4	2	13	14	9	1.556	509	489	1.041	Quarterfinals
4	(France) RC Cannes	6	3	3	9	12	12	1.000	533	517	1.031	
5	(France) Nantes VB	6	3	3	9	10	11	0.909	469	470	0.998	

== Playoffs ==
- Drawing of Lots was held on 20 February 2020.
- All times are local.

=== Quarterfinals ===
Pot 1	Pot 2
A. Carraro Imoco Conegliano; Eczacıbaşı VitrA Istanbul; Vakifbank Istanbul; Igor Gorgonzola Novara	Dinamo Moscow; Savino Del Bene Scandicci; Fenerbahçe Opet Istanbul; Allianz MTV Stuttgart

Team 1	Agg.	Team 2	1st leg	2nd leg
Fenerbahçe Opet Istanbul (Turkey)	–	(Italy) Igor Gorgonzola Novara	–	–
Dinamo Moscow (Russia)	0–6	(Turkey) Vakifbank Istanbul	0–3	0–3
Savino Del Bene Scandicci (Italy)	–	(Turkey) Eczacıbaşı VitrA Istanbul	–	–
Allianz MTV Stuttgart (Germany)	–	(Italy) A. Carraro Imoco Conegliano	0–3	–

==== First leg ====
Date	Time		Score		Set 1	Set 2	Set 3	Set 4	Set 5	Total	Report
Canceled	Canceled	Fenerbahçe Opet Istanbul (Turkey)	–	(Italy) Igor Gorgonzola Novara	–	–	–			0–0	Report
3 Mar	19:00	Dinamo Moscow (Russia)	0–3	(Turkey) Vakifbank Istanbul	13–25	17–25	17–25			47–75	Report
Canceled	Canceled	Savino Del Bene Scandicci (Italy)	–	(Turkey) Eczacıbaşı VitrA Istanbul	–	–	–			0–0	Report
4 Mar	19:00	Allianz MTV Stuttgart (Germany)	0–3	(Italy) A. Carraro Imoco Conegliano	17–25	16–25	20–25			53–75	Report

==== Second leg ====
Date	Time		Score		Set 1	Set 2	Set 3	Set 4	Set 5	Total	Report
TBD	TBD	Igor Gorgonzola Novara (Italy)	–	(Turkey) Fenerbahçe Opet Istanbul	–	–	–			0–0	
12 Mar	19:30	Vakifbank Istanbul (Turkey)	3–0	(Russia) Dinamo Moscow	25–13	25–18	25–15			75–46	Report
TBD	TBD	Eczacıbaşı VitrA Istanbul (Turkey)	–	(Italy) Savino Del Bene Scandicci	–	–	–			0–0	
Canceled	Canceled	A. Carraro Imoco Conegliano (Italy)	–	(Germany) Allianz MTV Stuttgart	–	–	–			0–0	Report

- The matches between Fenerbahçe Opet Istanbul and Igor Gorgonzola Novara, Savino Del Bene Scandicci and Eczacıbaşı VitrA Istanbul were postponed and then canceled due to the COVID-19 pandemic in Europe.

=== Semifinals ===
Team 1	Agg.	Team 2	1st leg	2nd leg
Vakifbank Istanbul (Turkey)	–	QF1W	–	–
QF3W	–	(Italy) A. Carraro Imoco Conegliano	–	–

==== First leg ====
Date	Time		Score		Set 1	Set 2	Set 3	Set 4	Set 5	Total	Report
Canceled	Canceled	Vakifbank Istanbul (Turkey)	–		–	–	–			0–0	Report
Canceled	Canceled		–	(Italy) A. Carraro Imoco Conegliano	–	–	–			0–0	Report

==== Second leg ====
Date	Time		Score		Set 1	Set 2	Set 3	Set 4	Set 5	Total	Report
Canceled	Canceled		–	(Turkey) Vakifbank Istanbul	–	–	–			0–0	Report
Canceled	Canceled	A. Carraro Imoco Conegliano (Italy)	–		–	–	–			0–0	Report

=== Final ===
Date	Time		Score		Set 1	Set 2	Set 3	Set 4	Set 5	Total	Report
Canceled	Canceled	SF1W	–	SF2W	–	–	–			0–0	Report
