= List of indoor arenas in Turkey =

The following is a list of indoor arenas in Turkey with a capacity of at least 2,000 spectators. Most of the arenas in this list have multiple uses such as individual sports, team sports as well as cultural events and political events.

== Existing arenas ==
| Images | Stadium | Capacity | City | Home team | Opened |
|---|---|---|---|---|---|
| | Sinan Erdem Dome | 16,000 | Istanbul | Bahçeşehir Koleji S.K. | 2010 |
| | Ülker Sports and Event Hall | 13,059 | Istanbul | Fenerbahçe S.K. | 2012 |
| | Ankara Arena | 10,400 | Ankara | Türk Telekom B.K. | 2010 |
| | Basketball Development Center | 10,000 | Istanbul | Anadolu Efes S.K. Galatasaray S.K. | 2024 |
| | Antalya Sports Hall | 10,000 | Antalya | | 2016 |
| | Karatay Congress and Sport Center | 10,000 | Konya | | 2013 |
| | Halkapınar Sport Hall | 10,000 | İzmir | Bornova Belediyespor | 2005 |
| | Başkent Volleyball Hall | 7,600 | Ankara | | 2010 |
| | Tofaş Nilüfer Spor Salonu | 7,500 | Bursa | Tofaş S.K. | 2014 |
| | Servet Tazegül Arena | 7,500 | Mersin | Mersin MSK | 2013 |
| | TVF 50th Anniversary Sport Hall | 7,500 | Istanbul | Istanbul Büyükşehir Belediyespor | 2008 |
| | Hayri Gür Arena | 7,500 | Trabzon | Trabzonspor B.K. | 2011 |
| | Yaşar Doğu Sports Hall | 7,500 | Samsun | | 2013 |
| | Ataköy Athletics Arena | 7,450 | Istanbul | | 2012 |
| | Kadir Has Sport Hall | 7,200 | Kayseri | Kayseri Basketbol | 2008 |
| | TVF Burhan Felek Sport Hall | 7,000 | Istanbul | Galatasaray S.K. Fenerbahçe S.K. | 2010 |
| | Karataş Şahinbey Sport Hall | 6,400 | Gaziantep | Gaziantep Basketbol | 2010 |
| | İzmir Atatürk Volleyball Hall | 6,000 | İzmir | | 2012 |
| | ASKI Sport Hall | 6,000 | Ankara | | 2001 |
| | Volkswagen Arena Istanbul | 5,240 | Istanbul | Darüşşafaka Basketbol | 2014 |
| | Pamukkale University Arena | 5,000 | Denizli | Merkezefendi Belediyesi Denizli Basket | 2014 |
| | Karşıyaka Arena | 5,000 | İzmir | Karşıyaka Basket | 2005 |
| | Anadolu Üniversitesi Sport Hall | 5,000 | Eskişehir | Eskişehir Basket | 2011 |
| | Ankara Atatürk Sport Hall | 4,500 | Ankara | | 1969 |
| | Eczacıbaşı Sports Hall, Kartal | 4,000 | Istanbul | Eczacıbaşı Volleyball | 2025 |
| | VakıfBank Sports Palace | 2,900 | Istanbul | VakıfBank S.K. | 2017 |
| | Başpehlivan Recep Kara Sports Hall | 2,000 | Ordu | | 2004 |

== See also ==
- List of football stadiums in Turkey
- List of indoor arenas in Europe
- List of indoor arenas by capacity
- Lists of stadiums
