= Eczacıbaşı Volleyball =

Women's volleyball club in Turkey

Eczacıbaşı Peron
- Full name: Eczacıbaşı SK Women's Volleyball Team
- Short name: Eczacıbaşı
- Founded: 1966
- Ground: Eczacıbaşı Sports Hall, Kartal (2025); Cebeci Sport Hall, Sultangazi (2024); Eczacıbaşı Sports Hall, Ayazağa (2001); Eczacıbaşı Sports Hall, Levent (1973) (Capacity: 1,000)
- Chairman: (Turkey) Faruk Eczacıbaşı
- Manager: (Italy) Giulio Bregoli
- Captain: (Turkey) Simge Aköz
- League: Sultanlar Ligi; CEV Champions League
- 2025–26 Sultanlar Ligi: 3rd
- Website: Club home page
- Championships: 3 World Championships; 1 European Championship; 3 CEV Cups; 28 Turkish Championships (12 pre-1984); 9 Turkish Cups; 5 Turkish Super Cups

Uniforms
Home	Away

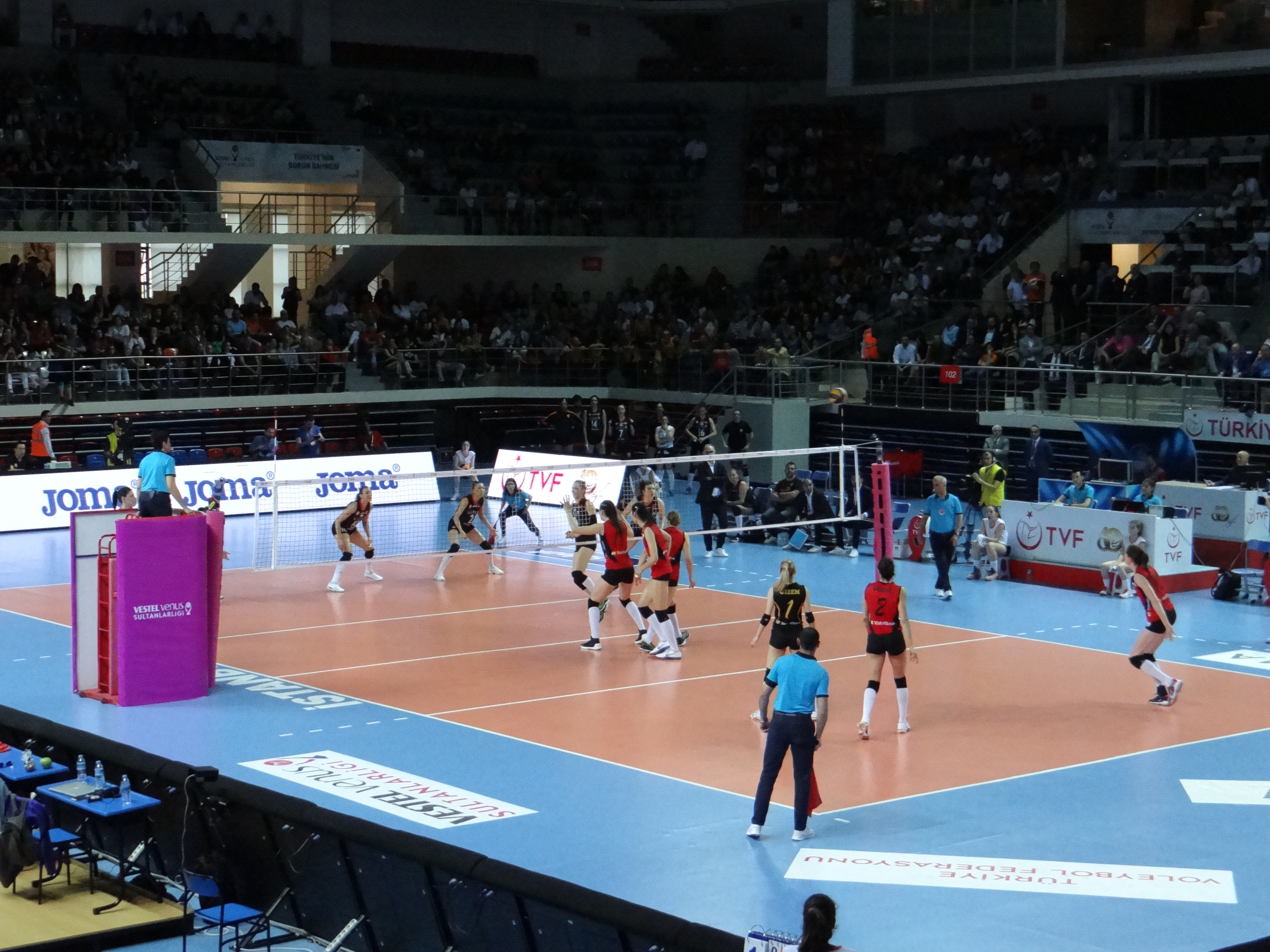
2017–18 Sultans League play-off final match between Eczacıbaşı VitrA and VakıfBank in the Burhan Felek Sport Hall.

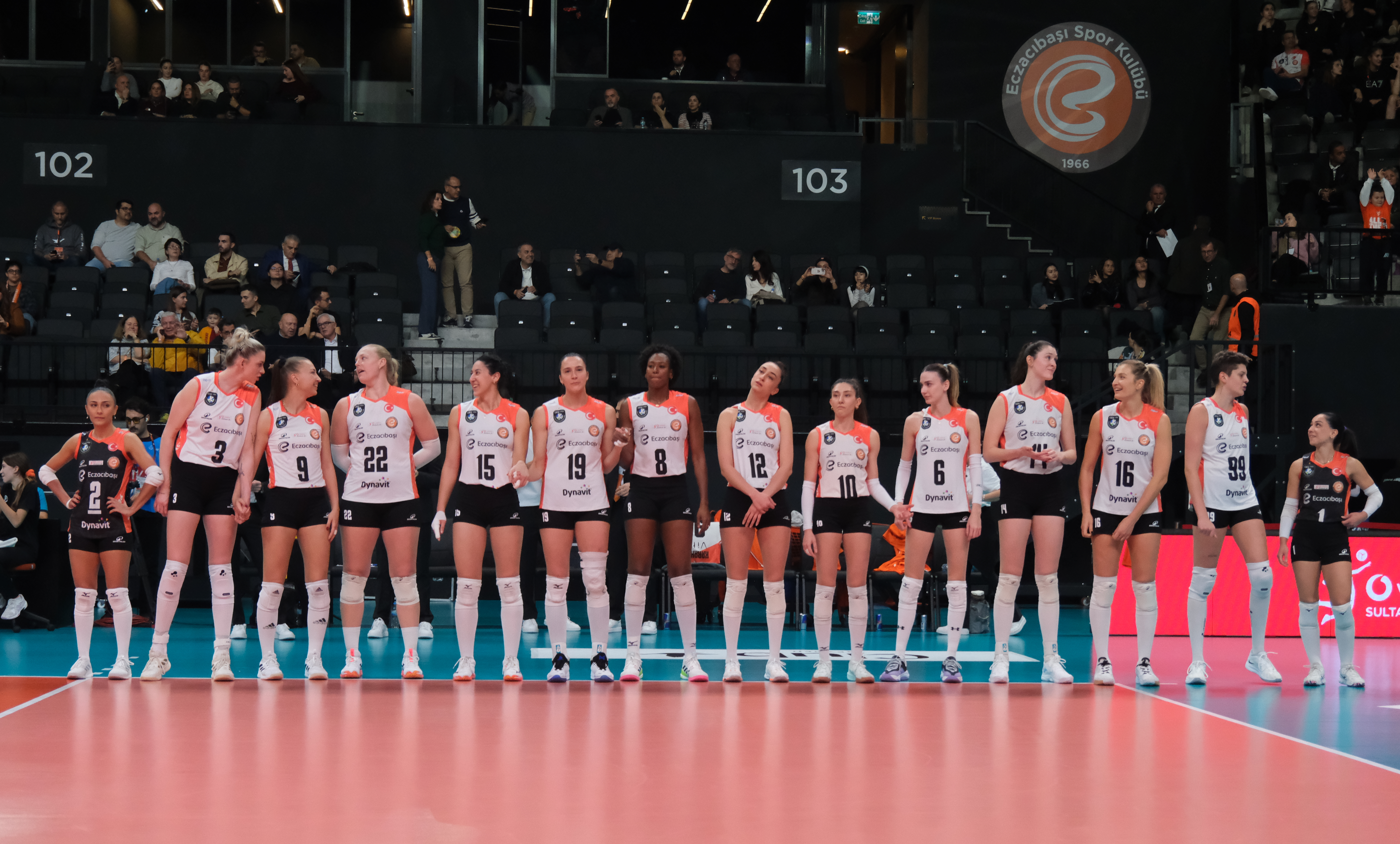
Eczacıbaşı team (December 2025)

Eczacıbaşı Peron is the professional women's volleyball department of Eczacıbaşı S.K., a Turkish sports club based in Istanbul, Turkey. The team plays its home matches at the Eczacıbaşı Spor Salonu hall in Istanbul. Eczacıbaşı has won a record 16 Turkish League titles and a record nine Turkish Cups, amongst others. In the 2014–15 season they won the CEV Champions League and that gave them the ticket to capture the 2015 FIVB World Club Championship in Zürich, a year later the club became the first club in the world to win the FIVB World Club Championship back-to-back by defending their crown in the Philippines during the 2016 FIVB World Club Championship in Manila. Eczacıbaşı Peron is the most successful Turkish volleyball club with 28 national championship titles overall since the introduction of a national league in 1956.

== Team names ==
Due to sponsorship, the women's volleyball team have competed under the following names:

- Eczacıbaşı (1966–2007)
- Eczacıbaşı Zentiva (2007–2010)
- Eczacıbaşı VitrA (2010–2021)
- Eczacıbaşı Dynavit (2021–2026)
- Eczacıbaşı Peron (2026–)

== History ==
The club has invested in women's volleyball for approximately 40 years and has pioneered for Turkish women's volleyball. The team plays in the CEV Champions League regularly.

Eczacıbaşı women's volleyball team won the European Cup Winners' Cup in 1999. The club also finished 2nd in the European Champion Clubs' Cup of 1980 and the CEV Cup of 1993; 3rd in the European Champion Clubs' Cup of 2000 and the Top Teams Cup of 2005; and 4th in the European Champion Clubs' Cup of 1984 and the Champions' League of 2001 and 2002; in the season 2014–15 won the CEV Champions League and the 2015 FIVB World Club Championship in Zürich, and a year later the club became won the FIVB World Club Championship back-to-back by defending their crown during the 2016 FIVB World Club Championship in Manila, becoming the first club in volleyball history to achieve this outstanding feat.

Eczacıbaşı has won more national championships than any other women's volleyball team in Turkey, with 27 Turkish League Championships under its belt since it entered the league in 1968. In the 1972–1973 season, the team began to set its first record of consecutive wins, winning 17 Turkish League titles in a row. It repeated this performance another five years between 1999 and 2003, when it also won five Turkish Cups.

Over the years, Eczacıbaşı has worked with many internationally renowned players, such as Irina Ilchenko (Irina Simirrnova), Lioubov Chachkova (Lioubov Kılıç), Yelena Godina, Antonina Zetova, Yevgeniya Artamonova, Tatyana Gracheva, Barbara Ružić (Barbara Jelić), Antonella Del Core, Mirka Francia, Neslihan Demir, Jordan Larson, Esra Gümüş, Gülden Kayalar and Kim Yeon-koung.

The team play their home matches in the 2025–26 Turkish Women's Volleyball League season at the Eczacıbaşı Sports Hall in Kartal, Istanbul with a capacity of 4.000.

== Team roster 2026–27 ==
As of September 2026.

No.	Player	Date of Birth	Height (m)	Position	Country
2	Simge Şebnem Aköz (C)	23 April 1991	1.68	Libero	Turkey
3	Selin Adalı	11 June 2003	1.70	Libero	Turkey
4	Mayu Ishikawa	14 May 2000	1.74	Outside hitter	Japan
6	Dilay Özdemir	15 August 2005	1.87	Setter	Turkey
8	Aslı Kalaç	13 December 1995	1.83	Middle blocker	Turkey
9	Ezel Balık	20 October 2009	1.98	Middle blocker	Turkey
10	Yaprak Erkek	2 September 2001	1.82	Outside hitter	Turkey
12	Elif Şahin	19 January 2001	1.89	Setter	Turkey
14	Dana Rettke	21 January 1999	2.04	Middle blocker	United States
15	Aleksandra Uzelac	27 July 2004	1.88	Outside hitter	Serbia
17	Ekaterina Antropova	19 March 2003	2.02	Opposite hitter	Italy
20	Iva Dudova	11 February 2006	1.98	Opposite hitter	Bulgaria
21	Camilla Weitzel	11 June 2000	1.95	Middle blocker	Germany
99	Ebrar Karakurt	17 Januar 2000	1.97	Outside hitter	Turkey

=== Technical staff ===
As of May 2026

Country	Name	Position
(Turkey)	Bilun Yilmaz	Club Manager
(Italy)	Giulio Cesare Bregoli	Head coach
(Argentina)	Gerardo Daglio	Coach assistant
(Turkey)	Kaan Incekara	Coach assistant
(Turkey)	Artun Aksan	Coach assistant
(Turkey)	Erman Güçin	Coach assistant

== Honours ==
=== International competitions ===
- FIVB Volleyball Women's Club World Championship
  - Winners (3): 2015, 2016, 2023
  - Runners-up (1): 2019
  - Third (1): 2018, 2022
- CEV Women's Champions League
  - Winners (1): 2014–15
  - Runners-up (3): 1979–80, 2022–23, 2025–26
  - Third (3): 1999–00, 2001–02, 2016–17
- CEV Cup
  - Winners (3): 1998–99, 2017–18, 2021–22
  - Third (1): 2004–05
- CEV Challenge Cup
  - Runners-up (1): 1992–93

=== National competitions ===
- Turkish Women's Volleyball League
  - Winners (16) (record): 1984–85, 1985–86, 1986–87, 1987–88, 1988–89, 1993–94, 1994–95, 1998–99, 1999–00, 2000–01, 2001–02, 2002–03, 2005–06, 2006–07, 2007–08, 2011–12
  - Runners-up (7): 1989–90, 1990–91, 1992–93, 1997–98, 2012–13, 2017–18, 2018–19, 2022–23, 2023-24
  - Third (9): 1991–92, 2003–04, 2004–05, 2009–10, 2010–11, 2013–14, 2014–15, 2015–16, 2021–22, 2024-25, 2025-26
- Turkish Women's Volleyball Championship (defunct)
  - Winners (12) (record): 1972–73, 1973–74, 1974–75, 1975–76, 1976–77, 1977–78, 1978–79, 1979–80, 1980–81, 1981–82, 1982–83, 1983–84
  - Runners-up (1): 1971–72
  - Third (2): 1969–70, 1970–71
- Turkish Cup
  - Winners (9) (record): 1998–99, 1999–00, 2000–01, 2001–02, 2002–03, 2008–09, 2010–11, 2011–12, 2018–19
  - Runners-up (4): 1997–98, 2012–13, 2017–18, 2020–21, 2023-24, 2024-25, 2025-26
  - Third (5): 2009–10, 2013–14, 2014–15, 2016–17, 2021–22
- Turkish Super Cup
  - Winners (5): 2011, 2012, 2018, 2019, 2020
  - Runners-up (3): 2009–10, 2013–14, 2021–22, 2024-25

== Notable players ==
Criteria: To appear in this section a player must have either:
- Played at least one season for the club.
- Set a club record or won an individual award while at the club.
- Played at least one official international match for their national team at any time.
- To perform very successfully during period in the club or at later/previous stages of his career.

Belgium

- Laura Heyrman

Brazil

- Natália Pereira
- Thaísa Menezes
- Andressa Picussa

Bulgaria

- Antonina Zetova

Canada

- Stacey Gordon

China

- Wang Yimei

Croatia

- Barbara Jelić
- Mira Topic
- Senna Ušić
- Dragana Marinković
- Maja Poljak

Czech Republic

- Helena Havelkova

Dominican Republic

- Bethania de la Cruz

Italy

- Mirka Francia
- Antonella Del Core
- Jenny Barazza
- Ekaterina Antropova

Germany

- Christiane Fürst
- Denise Hanke

South Korea

- Kim Yeon-koung

Russia

- Maria Borodakova
- Tatyana Gracheva
- Lioubov Sokolova
- Tatiana Kosheleva
- Yevgeniya Artamonova
- Yelena Godina
- Irina Iltchenko
- Rosir Calderon
- Irina Voronkova

Serbia

- Maja Ognjenović
- Tijana Bošković
- Ivana Đerisilo
- Vesna Čitaković
- Aleksandra Petrović
- Jovana Stevanović

Turkey

- Elif Ağca
- Simge Aköz
- Merve Atlıer
- Naz Aydemir
- Hande Baladın
- Büşra Cansu
- Neslihan Demir
- Ceren Nur Domaç
- Violet Duca
- Esra Gümüş
- Natalia Hanikoğlu
- Gülden Kayalar
- Büşra Kılıçlı
- Özge Kırdar
- Bahar Mert
- Bahar Toksoy Guidetti
- Neriman Özsoy
- Ebrar Karakurt

United States

- Jordan Larson
- Lauren Gibbemeyer
- Carli Lloyd
- Molly Kreklow
- Christa Harmotto
- Nancy Metcalf
- Heather Bown
- Rachael Adams
- Tayyiba Haneef-Park
- Tracy Stalls
- Chiaka Ogbogu
- Jordan Thompson
- McKenzie Adams
- Dana Rettke

Players written in italic still play for the club.

== See also ==
- Eczacıbaşı
- Turkey women's national volleyball team
- Turkish women in sports
