= Aydın Boysan =

Turkish architect (1921-2018)

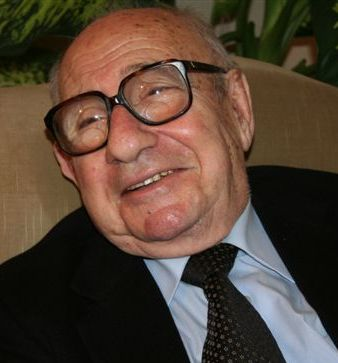
- Aydın Boysan in 2008
- Born: 17 June 1921; Istanbul, Ottoman Empire
- Died: 5 January 2018 (aged 96); Istanbul, Turkey
- Education: Pertevniyal High School, Mimar Sinan University
- Occupations: Architect; essayist; author
- Board member of: Chamber of Architects
- Spouse: Suzan Boysan
- Children: Burak Boysan

Aydın Boysan (17 June 1921 – 5 January 2018) was a Turkish architect, academic, author and essayist.

== Life and profession ==
Boysan was born in Istanbul; his father Esat was an accountant and his mother Nevreste was a teacher. After Pertevniyal High School he studied architecture in Academy of Fine Arts (later renameded as Mimar Sinan Fine Arts University). For 54 years (between 1945 and 1999) he served as an architect. During this period he won many architectural design competitions both at home and abroad. The total area of his building designs was about 1,500,000 square metres (16,000,000 sq ft) In 1954, he became the charter member of the Chamber of Architects. He also became the first secretary general of the chamber. Later he served as the representative of the chamber in Istanbul. Between 1957 and 1972 he taught in the Istanbul Technical University.

== As an author and essayist ==
Boysan was a well known name in Turkish journalism. In 1984 he founded Bas Printing House and published essay books. His essays are mostly about his memoirs and humor. He was also a columnist. He wrote in Hürriyet for ten years and in Akşam for three years.

== Publications ==
The following is a list of Boysan's books:

=== Humor ===
- Paldır Güldür
- Yangın Var
- Umut Simit
- Yalan, Oldu mu Ya!
- Fısıltı
- Dostluk
- Aldanmak
- Söylesem Bir Türlü.

=== Travel ===
- Dünyayı Severek( Vol.I, II, III)
- Yollarda
- Uzaklardan

=== Fiction ===
- Yıl 2046 Uzay Anıları,

=== Memoir ===
- İstanbul Esintileri
- Leke Bırakan Gölgeler
- Yaşama Sevinci
- Sev ve Yaşa
- Damlalar
- Zaman Geçerken
- Aynalar,
- Yüzler ve Yürekler
- Felekten Bir Gün
- İstanbul’un Kuytu Köşeleri
- Neşeye Şarkı
- Nereye Gitti İstanbul?
- Ne Hos Zamanlardi
